= Ferryland (electoral district) =

Provincial electoral district in Newfoundland and Labrador, Canada

Coordinates: 47°01′N 52°53′W

Newfoundland and Labrador electoral district
- Ferryland in relation to other districts in Newfoundland (left) and St. John's (right).

Provincial electoral district
- Legislature: Newfoundland and Labrador House of Assembly
MHA
Loyola O'Driscoll
Progressive Conservative
- District created: 1949
- First contested: 1949
- Last contested: 2025

Demographics
- Population (2011): 14,007
- Electors (2015): 9,981
- Area (km²): 2,800
- Census division: Division No. 1
- Census subdivision(s): Aquaforte, Bay Bulls, Cape Broyle, Fermeuse, Ferryland, Petty Harbour–Maddox Cove, Port Kirwan, Portugal Cove South, Renews–Cappahayden, St. John's (part), St. Shott's, Trepassey, Witless Bay, Division No. 1, Subd. D, Division No. 1, Subd. U, Division No. 1, Subd. V

Ferryland is a provincial electoral district for the House of Assembly of Newfoundland and Labrador, Canada. In 2011, there were 8,571 eligible voters living within the district.

This was the most strongly anti-Confederation area of the province in the late 1940s, but turned Liberal in the 1950s and 1960s. It is historically a fishing district, but tourism has been growing. Ferryland contains part of the city of St. John's in the area of Lower Goulds as well as the communities of: Admiral's Cove, Aquaforte, Bay Bulls, Bauline East, Biscay Bay, Brigus South, Burnt Cove, Calvert, Cape Broyle, Cappahayden, Daniel's Point, Fermeuse, Ferryland, Kingman's Cove, La Manche, Mobile, Petty Harbour–Maddox Cove, Port Kirwan, Portugal Cove South, Renews, St. Michael's, St. Shotts, Tors Cove, Trepassey, and Witless Bay. The district is considered a Progressive Conservative (PC) stronghold.

Bordering districts include Conception Bay South, Harbour Main, Mount Pearl-Southlands, Placentia-St. Mary's, and Waterford Valley.

== Members of the House of Assembly ==
The district has elected the following members of the House of Assembly:

Assembly	Years	Member	Party
29th	1949–1951	Peter John Cashin	Independent
29th	1951	Peter John Cashin	Progressive Conservative
30th	1951–1952	Augustine Michael Duffy	Progressive Conservative
30th	1952–1956	Myles Murray	Liberal
31st	1956–1959	Myles Murray	Liberal
32nd	1959–1962	Myles Murray	Liberal
33rd	1962–1966	Myles Murray	Liberal
34th	1966–1971	Aiden Joseph Maloney	Liberal
35th	1971–1972	Thomas Mershon Doyle	Progressive Conservative
36th	1972–1975	Thomas Mershon Doyle	Progressive Conservative
37th	1975–1979	Charles J. Power	Progressive Conservative
38th	1979–1982	Charles J. Power	Progressive Conservative
39th	1982–1985	Charles J. Power	Progressive Conservative
40th	1985–1989	Charles J. Power	Progressive Conservative
41st	1989–1992	Charles J. Power	Progressive Conservative
41st	1992–1993	Loyola Sullivan	Progressive Conservative
42nd	1993–1996	Loyola Sullivan	Progressive Conservative
43rd	1996–1999	Loyola Sullivan	Progressive Conservative
44th	1999–2003	Loyola Sullivan	Progressive Conservative
45th	2003–2006	Loyola Sullivan	Progressive Conservative
45th	2007	Keith Hutchings	Progressive Conservative
46th	2007–2011	Keith Hutchings	Progressive Conservative
47th	2011–2015	Keith Hutchings	Progressive Conservative
48th	2015–2019	Keith Hutchings	Progressive Conservative
49th	2019–2021	Loyola O'Driscoll	Progressive Conservative
50th	2021–2025	Loyola O'Driscoll	Progressive Conservative
51st	2025–Present	Loyola O'Driscoll	Progressive Conservative

== Election results ==
Graph of election results (minor parties that never got 2% of the vote or did not run consistently are omitted) View source data.

2025 Newfoundland and Labrador general election
Party	Candidate	Votes	%	±%
Progressive Conservative	Loyola O'Driscoll	3,507	52.7%	+0.37
Liberal	Cheryl O'Brien	2,904	43.6%	-0.53
New Democratic	Josh Meadus	243	3.7%	+0.16
Total valid votes				
Total rejected ballots				
Turnout				
Eligible voters				
Progressive Conservative hold		Swing		+0.5%

2021 Newfoundland and Labrador general election
Party	Candidate	Votes	%	±%
Progressive Conservative	Loyola O'Driscoll	3,197	52.33	-8.26
Liberal	Cheryl O'Brien	2,696	44.13	+9.18
New Democratic	Paul Murphy	216	3.54	
Total valid votes		6,109	99.45	
Total rejected ballots		34	0.55	
Turnout		6,143	58.69	
Eligible voters		10,467		
Progressive Conservative hold		Swing		-8.72
Source(s) "Officially Nominated Candidates General Election 2021" (PDF). Elections Newfoundland and Labrador. "NL Election 2021 Report" (PDF).

2019 Newfoundland and Labrador general election
Party	Candidate	Votes	%	±%
Progressive Conservative	Loyola O'Driscoll	4,074	60.59	+10.76
Liberal	Janice Ryan	2,350	34.95	-6.13
Independent	Chris Molloy	300	4.46	–
Total valid votes		6,724	99.23	
Total rejected ballots		52	0.77	+0.59
Turnout		6,776	69.27	+6.97
Eligible voters		9,782		
Progressive Conservative hold		Swing		+8.45

2015 Newfoundland and Labrador general election
Party	Candidate	Votes	%
Progressive Conservative	Keith Hutchings	3,093	49.83
Liberal	Jeff Marshall	2,550	41.08
New Democratic	Mona Rossiter	564	9.09
Total valid votes		6,207	99.82
Total rejected ballots		11	0.18
Turnout		6,218	62.30
Eligible voters		9,981	
Source: Elections Newfoundland and Labrador

2011 Newfoundland and Labrador general election
Party	Candidate	Votes	%	±%
Progressive Conservative	Keith Hutchings	3,640	72.15	-11.65
NDP	Chris Molloy	1.224	24.26	+17.35
Liberal	Dianne Randell	181	3.59	-5.7

2007 Newfoundland and Labrador general election
Party	Candidate	Votes	%	±%
Progressive Conservative	Keith Hutchings	4,256	83.8%	+8.7%
Liberal	Kevin Bennett	472	9.29%	-10.9%
NDP	Grace Bavington	351	6.91%	+1.95%

By-election — February 8, 2007 On the resignation of Loyola Sullivan
Party	Candidate	Votes	%	±%
Progressive Conservative	Keith Hutchings	2,770	75.10%	-11.24%
Liberal	Kevin Bennett	715	19.38%	+10.97%
NDP	Rick Boland	183	4.96%	-0.19%

2003 Newfoundland and Labrador general election
Party	Candidate	Votes	%	±%
Progressive Conservative	Loyola Sullivan	5,167	86.34	–
Liberal	Andrea Kavanagh	504	8.41	
NDP	Lois Martin	309	5.15	
Independent	Pilar Riego-Hickey	11	0.18	

1999 Newfoundland and Labrador general election
Party	Candidate	Votes	%	±%
Progressive Conservative	Loyola Sullivan	4,482	66.0%	–
Liberal	Harold Mulloney	2,141	31.5%	
NDP	Gerry Ryan	147	2.2%	

1996 Newfoundland and Labrador general election
Party	Candidate	Votes	%	±%
Progressive Conservative	L Sullivan	4834	68.36%	–
Liberal	T Best	2237	31.63%	

1993 Newfoundland and Labrador general election
Party	Candidate	Votes	%	±%
Progressive Conservative	L Sullivan	3675	74.00%	–
Liberal	MC O'Brien	1125	22.65%	
NDP	V Silk	166	0.32%	

== See also ==
- List of Newfoundland and Labrador provincial electoral districts
- Canadian provincial electoral districts
