= Newfoundland and Labrador Route 10 =

Highway in Newfoundland and Labrador

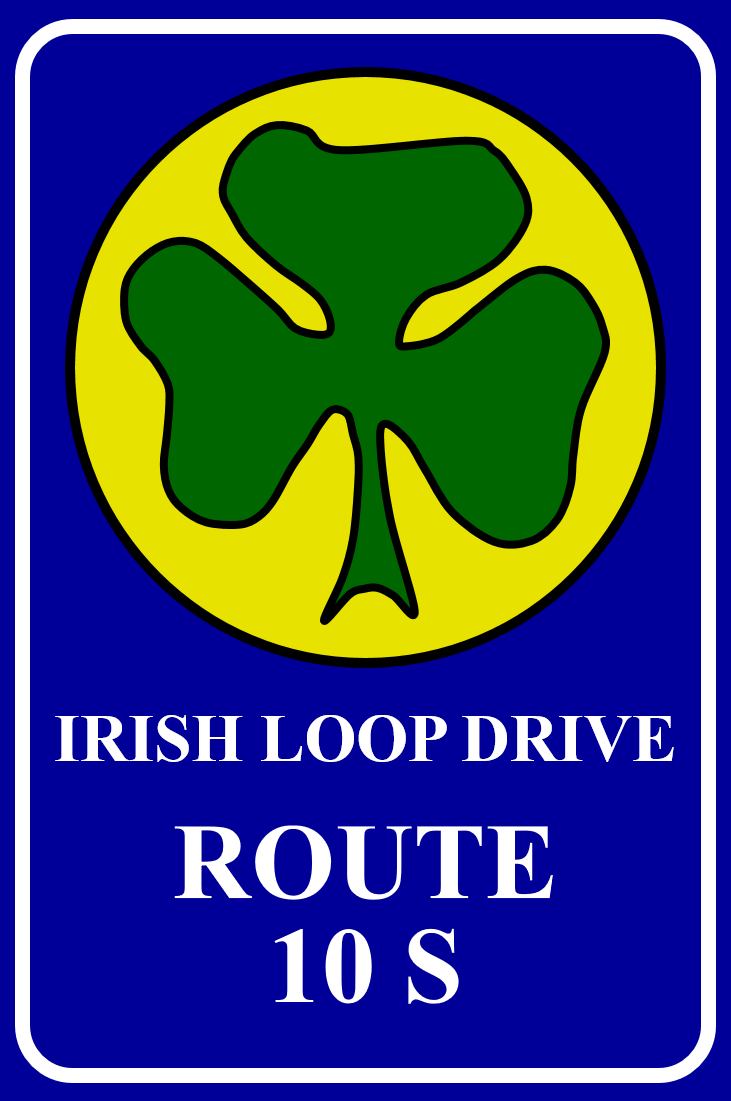
Route 10
- Irish Loop Drive; Southern Shore Highway

Route information
- Maintained by Newfoundland and Labrador Department of Transportation and Infrastructure
- Length: 173 km (107 mi)

Major junctions
- South end: Route 90 in St. Vincent's-St. Stephen's-Peter's River
- Route 13 in Witless Bay; Route 3 in Goulds; Route 11 in Goulds
- North end: Route 2 / The Parkway in St. John's

Location
- Country: Canada
- Province: Newfoundland and Labrador

Highway system
- Highways in Newfoundland and Labrador
← Route 3A	→ Route 11

Route 10, also known as the eastern portion of the Irish Loop Drive and the Southern Shore Highway, is a 173-kilometre (107 mi) uncontrolled-access highway in Newfoundland and Labrador. Its southern terminus is at Route 90 in St. Vincent's-St. Stephen's-Peter's River, and its northern terminus is at Route 2 and The Parkway in St. John's. The route is in Division No. 1 and winds along the southern and eastern coasts of Avalon Peninsula on the island of Newfoundland.

== Route description ==
Route 10 begins in St. Vincent's-St. Stephen's-Peter's River at a bridge along the beach, which straddles a narrow isthmus between the ocean and a large lagoon (Holyrood Pond), with the road continuing west as Route 90. It continues south along the coast to cross over the Peter's River before leaving the town and winding its way east through hilly and rural grassland. The highway then has an intersection with St. Shott's Road, the only road access to the town of St. Shott's and Cape Pine, before passing through the towns of Trepassey, Biscay Bay, and Portugal Cove South. Route 10 passes just north of Chance Cove Provincial Park before turning north to wind along the coastline again to pass through Renews-Cappahayden, Fermeuse (where it has an intersection with Port Kirwan Road, which provides access to Port Kirwan), Aquaforte, Ferryland, Calvert, and Cape Broyle. It then passes through La Manche Provincial Park before passing through Tors Cove, Mobile, and Witless Bay, where it has an intersection with Route 13. The highway passes through Bay Bulls before leaving the coastline and passing through rural areas for several kilometres. Route 10 then passes through Goulds, where it has intersections with Route 3 and Route 11, before entering St. John's and coming to an end at an interchange with Route 2, with the road continuing north as The Parkway (Columbus Drive).

== Major intersections ==
Location	km	mi	Destinations	Notes
St. Vincent's-St. Stephen's-Peter's River	0.0	0.0	Transition to Route 90 north (Salmonier Line) – Gaskiers-Point la Haye	Southern terminus; southern terminus of Route 90; Irish Loop Drive continues along Route 90
	16.4	10.2	St. Shott's Road (Route 10-52) - St. Shott's, Cape Pine	
Portugal Cove South	44.3	27.5	Harbour Road (Route 10-50) - Cape Race Lighthouse	
	63.2	39.3	Access road into Chance Cove Provincial Park	
Fermeuse	89.3	55.5	Kingman's Road (Route 10-45 - Kingman's	
Fermeuse	90.3	56.1	Port Kirwan Road (Route 10-42) - Port Kirwan	
Cape Broyle	116	72	Admiral's Cove Road (Route 10-35) - Admiral's Cove	
Cape Broyle	119	74	Brigus South Road (Route 10-34) - Brigus South	
La Manche Provincial Park	124	77	La Manche Road (Route 10-33) - La Manche, La Manche Provincial Park	
La Manche Provincial Park	125	78	Main Access Road into La Manche Provincial Park	
Tors Cove	135	84	Burnt Cove Road (Route 10-32) - Burnt Cove, St. Michaels, Bauline East	
Witless Bay	147	91	Route 13 west (Witless Bay Line) to Route 1 (TCH) – Holyrood	Eastern terminus of Route 13
Goulds	162	101	Route 3 north (Robert E Howlett Memorial Drive/Goulds Bypass) – Mount Pearl	Southern terminus of Route 3
Goulds	166	103	Route 11 north (Petty Harbour Road) – Petty Harbour-Maddox Cove, Blackhead, Cape Spear	Southern terminus of Route 11
St. John's	173	107	Route 2 (Pitts Memorial Drive); The Parkway (Columbus Drive)	Interchange; northern terminus; southern terminus of The Parkway
1.000 mi = 1.609 km; 1.000 km = 0.621 mi: Route transition

== Attractions along Route 10 ==
- La Manche Provincial Park
- Chance Cove Provincial Park
- Cape Race Lighthouse
- Cape Pine
