= Trepassey railway branchline =

Railway in Newfoundland, Canada

The Trepassey railway branchline is a historic railway line that had been operated by the Newfoundland Railway in the Dominion of Newfoundland between 1913 and 1931. It connected the Newfoundland Railway's main line at St. John's with the outport of Trepassey 145 km (90 mi) to the southwest.

== History ==
Construction of a railway to Trepassey and the southern Avalon Peninsula was championed by local politician Sir Michael Patrick Cashin, who represented Ferryland district from 1893 until 1923. Cashin turned the first sod at a ceremonial start of construction for the railway to Trepassey at Waterford Bridge in St. John's on May 12, 1911.

The first passenger and freight trains began operating for common carrier service on the rail line in 1913, however, the tracks did not reach Trepassey until late 1917.

The rail line was abandoned by the Newfoundland Railway in 1931 and the rails were removed in stages from 1933 - 1942.
