= Newfoundland and Labrador Route 13 =

Highway in Newfoundland and Labrador, Canada

Route 13
- Witless Bay Line

Route information
- Maintained by the Newfoundland and Labrador Department of Transportation and Infrastructure
- Length: 20.9 km (13.0 mi)

Major junctions
- West end: Route 1 (TCH) in Holyrood
- East end: Route 10 in Witless Bay

Location
- Country: Canada
- Province: Newfoundland and Labrador

Highway system
- Highways in Newfoundland and Labrador
← Route 11	→ Route 20

Route 13, also known as Witless Bay Line, is a 20.9-kilometre (13.0 mi), uncontrolled-access highway in Newfoundland and Labrador. Its western terminus is at Route 1 (TCH) in Holyrood and its eastern terminus is at Route 10 in Witless Bay. The route travels a generally straight line through the centre of Avalon Peninsula and is completely in Division No. 1.

The entire route of Route 13 is rural, with no other major communities or services of any kind along its length. Butter Pot Provincial Park is located approximately 4.8 kilometres (3.0 mi) from the highway's western terminus via Route 1.

== Major intersections ==
Location	km	mi	Destinations	Notes
Holyrood	0.0	0.0	Route 1 (TCH) – Clarenville, St. John's	Western terminus; exit 37 on Route 1
Witless Bay	20.9	13.0	Route 10 (Irish Loop Drive/Southern Shore Highway) – Bay Bulls, Trepassey	Eastern terminus
1.000 mi = 1.609 km; 1.000 km = 0.621 mi
