= Calvert, Newfoundland and Labrador =

Calvert
- Local service district / designated place
- Location of Calvert in Newfoundland
- Coordinates: 47°03′11″N 52°54′39″W
- Country: Canada
- Province: Newfoundland and Labrador

Government
  - MHA: Loyola O'Driscoll
  - MP: Ken McDonald

Population
  - Total: 355
- Time zone: UTC-3:30 (Newfoundland Time)
  - Summer (DST): UTC-2:30 (Newfoundland Daylight)
- Area code: 709
- Highways: Route 10

Calvert is a local service district and designated place in the Canadian province of Newfoundland and Labrador in the Southern Shore region of the province. It is 72 kilometres south of the provincial capital St. John's, 7 kilometres south of Cape Broyle, and 3 kilometres north of Ferryland. The population in 2001 was 355, a decline of 17% since 1996.

== History ==
Settlers were recorded at Cap(e)lin Bay, what is now Calvert, as early as the 1670s.

Prior to January 30, 1922, Calvert was known as Caplin Bay, sometimes spelled Capelin Bay. It is said to have been named for the large number of capelin that were fished by its early settlers. As several other Newfoundland communities had similar names, and in light of the necessities of the postal service, the Newfoundland Nomenclature Board, in the early 20th century, made efforts to reduce duplication of place names. It responded favourably to a 1922 petition collected by the parish priest of Ferryland, Father Alfred Maher to change the name of the settlement in honour of Sir George Calvert, First Baron Baltimore, and founder, in the early seventeenth century, of the Colony of Avalon at what is now nearby Ferryland.

A book about the community was written by Gerald Pocius, titled "A Place to Belong: Community Order and Everyday Space in Calvert, Newfoundland".

== Geography ==
Calvert is in Newfoundland within Subdivision U of Division No. 1.

== Demographics ==
As a designated place in the 2016 Census of Population conducted by Statistics Canada, Calvert recorded a population of 219 living in 103 of its 177 total private dwellings, a change of −14.1% from its 2011 population of 255. With a land area of 5.45 km^{2} (2.10 sq mi), it had a population density of 40.2/km^{2} (104.1/sq mi) in 2016.

== Government ==
Calvert is a local service district (LSD) that is governed by a committee responsible for the provision of certain services to the community. The chair of the LSD committee is Adrian Sullivan.

== Notable people ==
Loyola Sullivan, the former provincial Minister of Finance and Member of the House of Assembly for Ferryland District, and former Canadian ambassador for Fisheries Conservation, is from Calvert.

Joel Thomas Hynes, novelist and actor, is from Calvert.

== See also ==
- List of communities in Newfoundland and Labrador
- List of designated places in Newfoundland and Labrador
- List of local service districts in Newfoundland and Labrador
- Royal eponyms in Canada
