= Trepassey Bay =

Bay in Newfoundland, Canada

Coordinates: 46.66°N 53.34°W

Location of Trepassey Bay in Newfoundland

Trepassey Bay is a natural bay on the southeast end of the Avalon Peninsula of the island of Newfoundland, in the Canadian province of Newfoundland and Labrador.

Communities located in Trepassey Bay are Trepassey, Biscay Bay and Portugal Cove South.

== Gallery ==
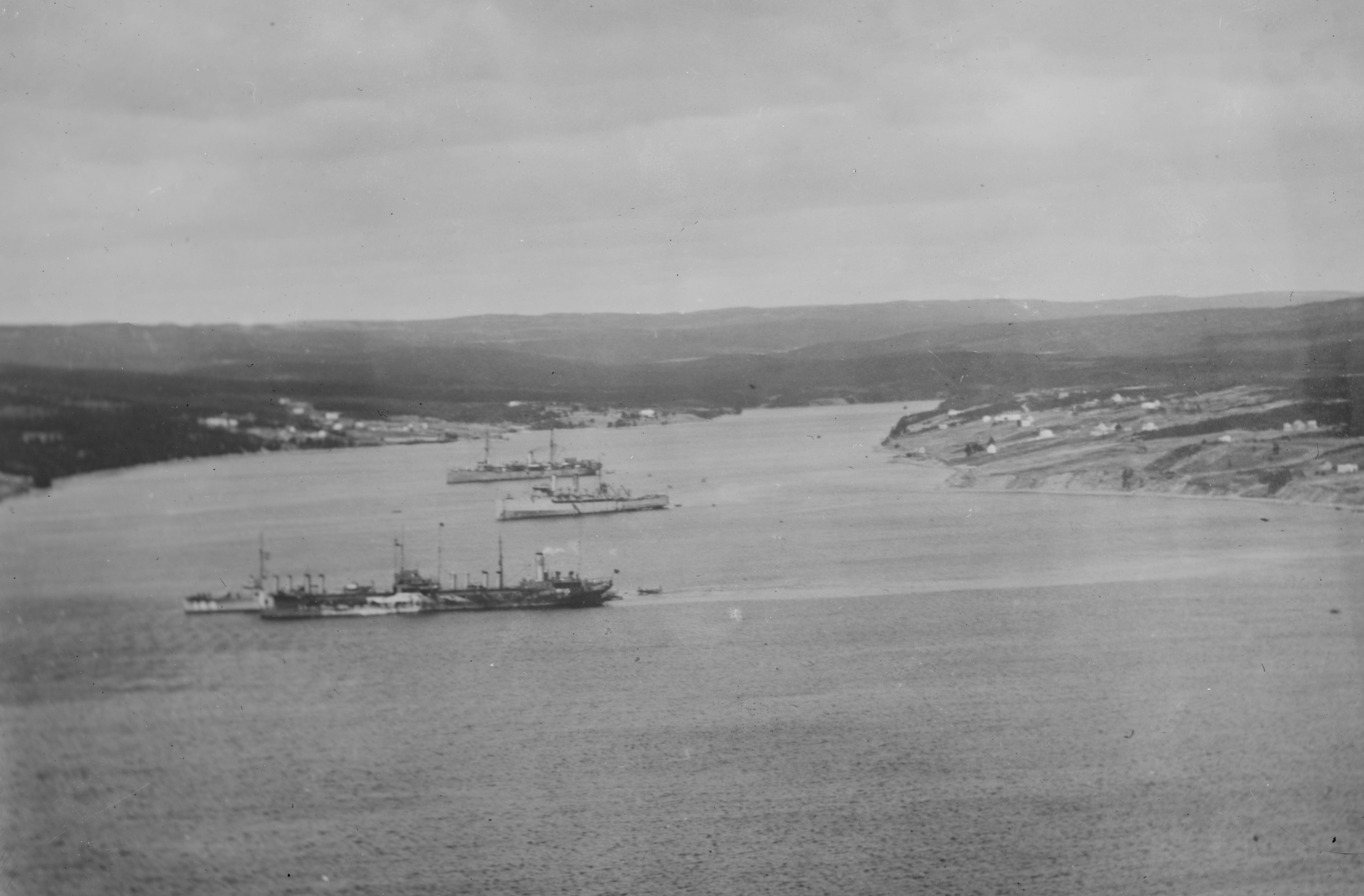
US Navy ships in Trepassey Bay c. 1919

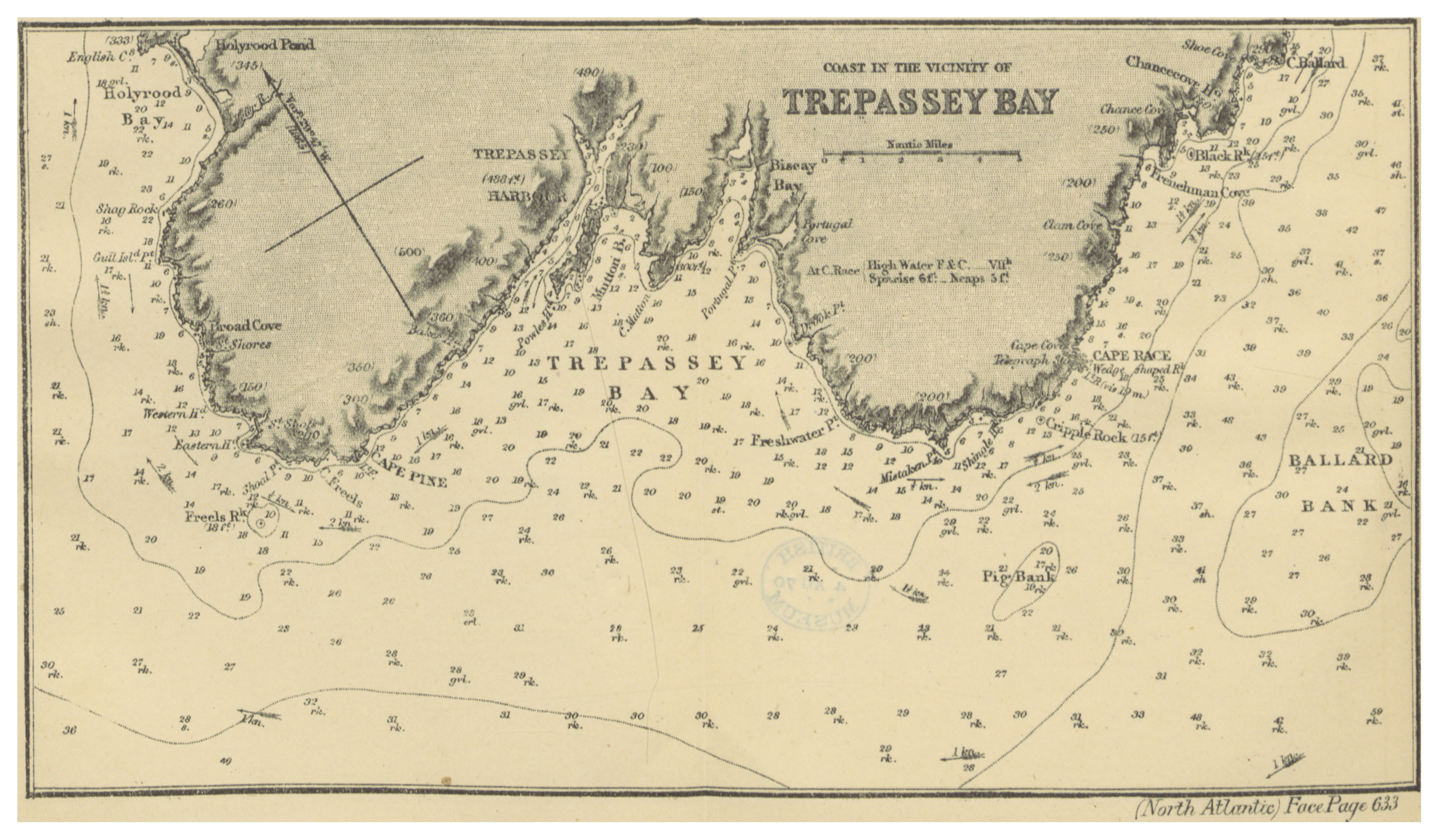
Nautical chart of the Trepassey Bay, 1869

== See also ==
- Baie des Trépassés
