= South Avalon–Burin oceanic barrens =

Ecological region within Canada

South Avalon-Burin oceanic barrens
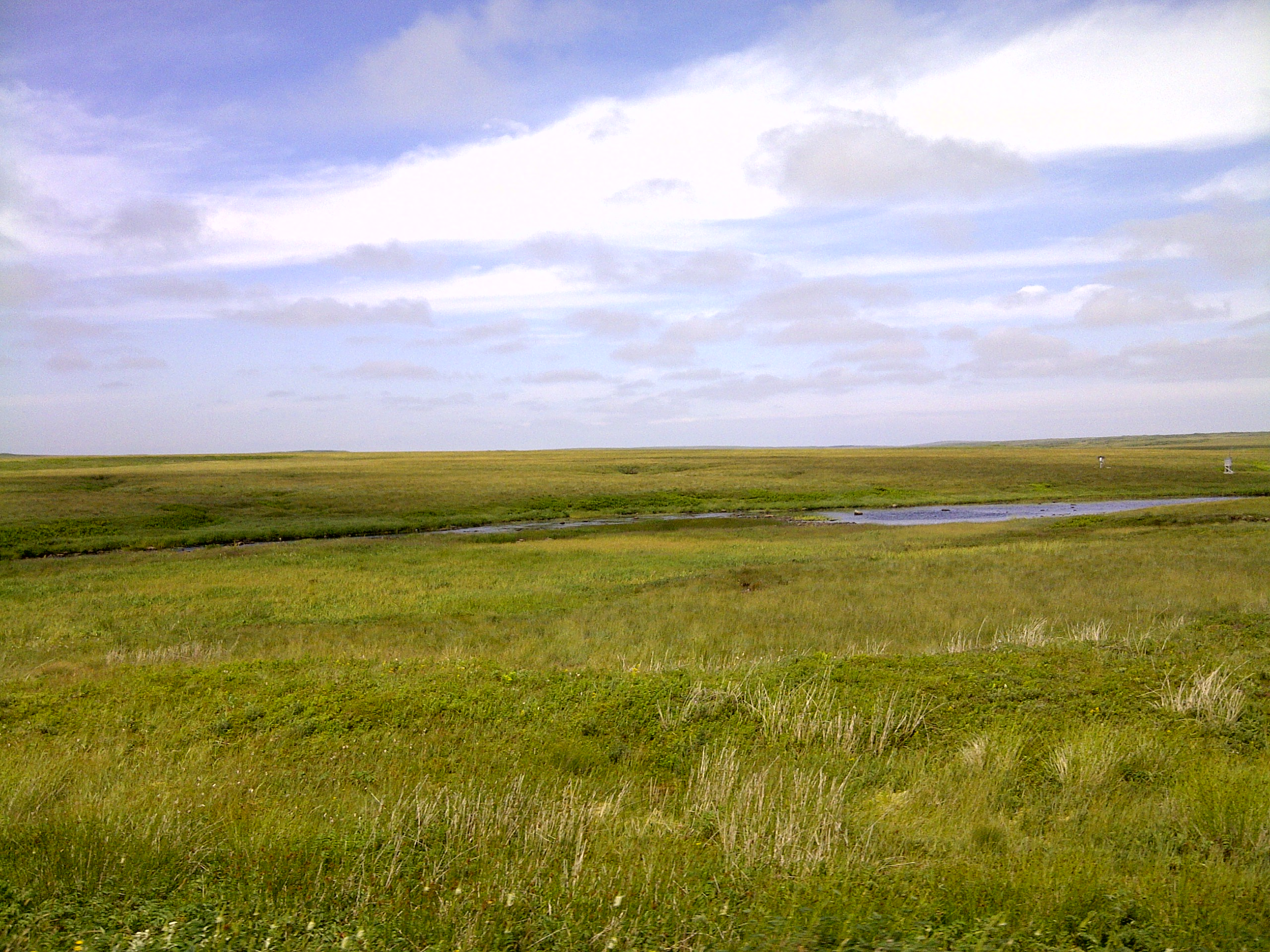
- Oceanic barrens near Trepassey

- Ecoregion territory (in green, arrow pointing upper right)

Ecology
- Realm: Nearctic
- Biome: Boreal forests/taiga
- Borders: Eastern Canadian forests
- Bird species: 111
- Mammal species: 7

Geography
- Area: 2,072 km^{2} (800 mi^{2})
- Countries: Canada and France
- Subdivisions: Newfoundland and Labrador; Saint Pierre and Miquelon (France)
- Climate type: Subarctic (Dfc) and subpolar oceanic (Cfc)

Conservation
- Conservation status: Relatively Stable/Intact
- Habitat loss: 0%
- Protected: 5.41%

South Avalon-Burin oceanic barrens is a taiga ecoregion located within the Canadian province of Newfoundland and Labrador and the French overseas collectivity of Saint Pierre and Miquelon. It is defined by the World Wildlife Fund (WWF) categorization system as inhabiting the southern headlands of the Avalon and Burin Peninsulas along the southeastern coast of Newfoundland.

== Climate ==
This ecoregion features a predominantly subarctic climate (Köppen Dfc) with cold winters and cool, foggy summers. The area around Mistaken Point features a milder subpolar oceanic climate (Köppen Cfc) with relatively mild winters and cool summers. Precipitation occurs year-round, with a mean annual precipitation between 1200 and 1500 mm.

== Ecology ==
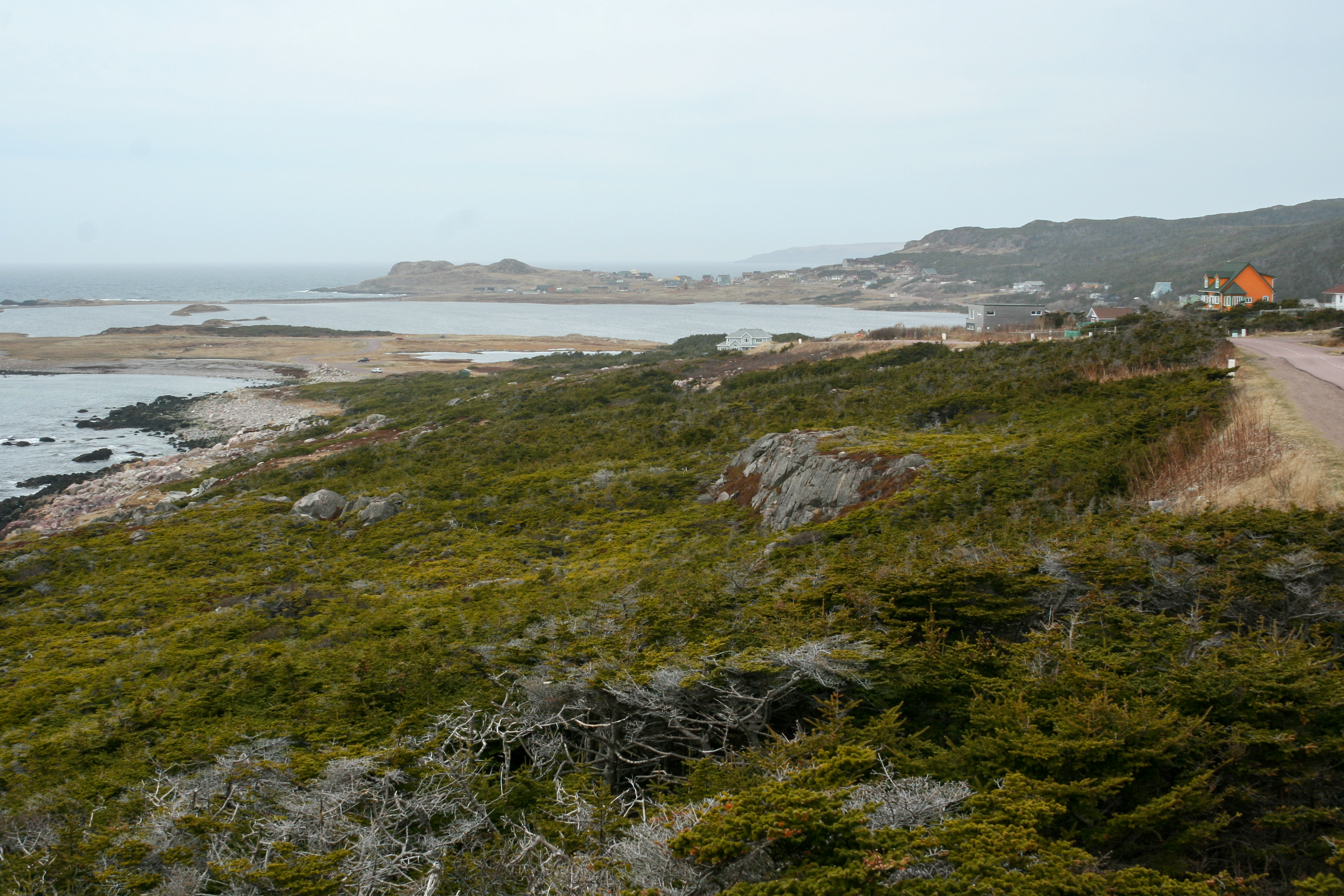
Dwarf balsam fir and low-growing ericaceous shrubs on Saint Pierre Island

=== Flora ===
This ecoregion supports dense carpets of moss and fruticose lichen, along with low-growing ericaceous shrubs and wildflowers. Small communities of dwarf balsam fir can be found in some upland regions.

The moss-heath plant associations of this ecoregion, dominated by blanket bogs and Racomitrium heath, are unique in North America. Its closest affinities found in the oceanic climates of Iceland and northern Scotland.

=== Fauna ===
Characteristic wildlife include caribou, willow ptarmigan, Atlantic puffin, and variety of seabird species. Cape St. Mary's hosts one of the world's largest colonies of northern gannet.

== Conservation ==
Despite being underrepresented, about 95% of this ecoregion remains ecologically intact. Some notable protected areas include Cape St. Mary's Ecological Reserve, Chance Cove Provincial Park, and Mistaken Point Ecological Reserve.

== See also ==
- List of ecoregions in Canada (WWF)
- List of ecoregions in France
