= Pont-Croix =

Pont-Croix Pontekroaz
- Commune
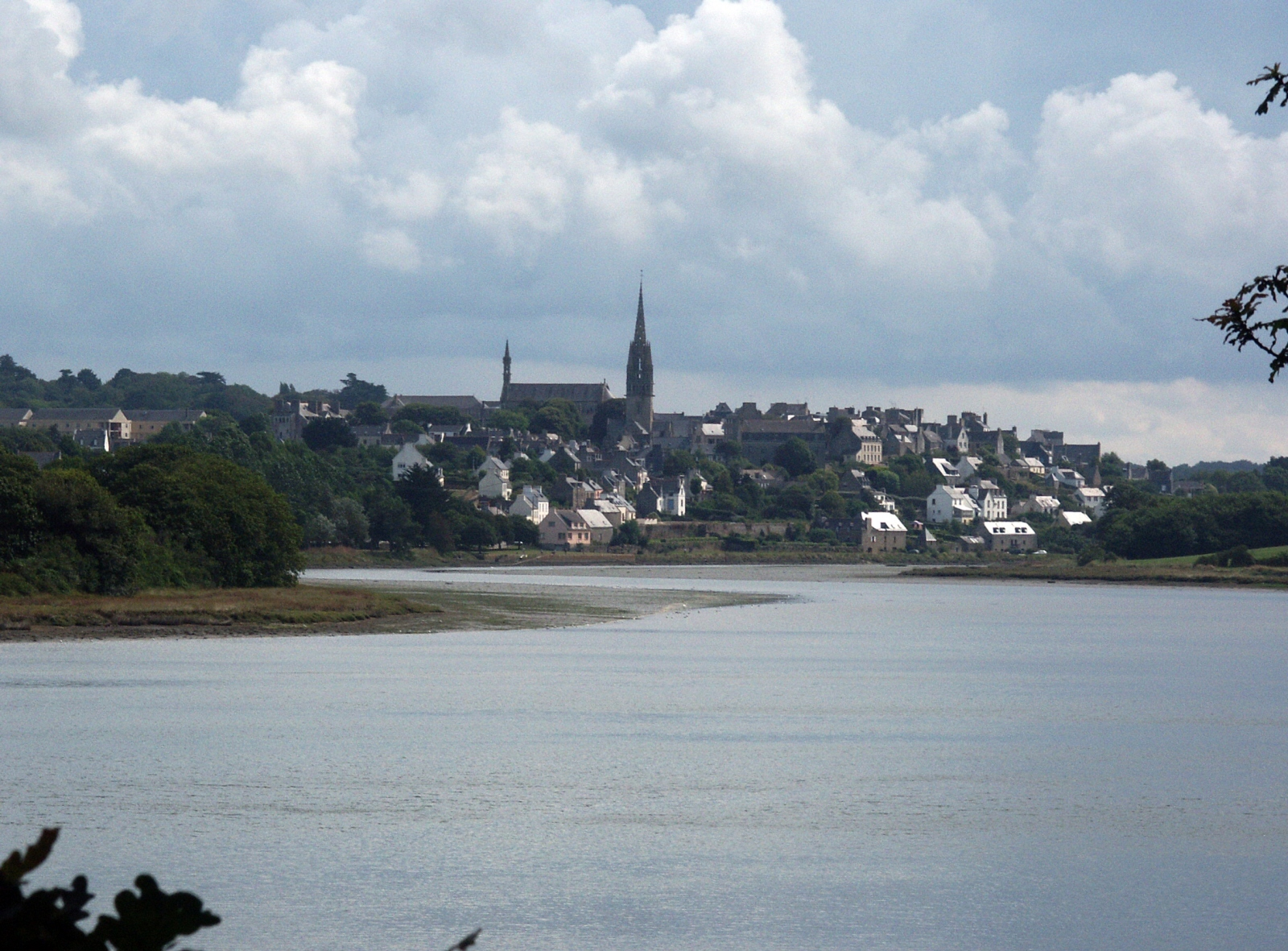
- A general view of Pont-Croix

- Coat of arms
- Location of Pont-Croix
- Location within France Location within Brittany
- Coordinates: 48°02′35″N 4°29′17″W
- Country: France
- Region: Brittany
- Department: Finistère
- Arrondissement: Quimper
- Canton: Douarnenez
- Intercommunality: Cap Sizun - Pointe du Raz

Government
  - Mayor (2020–2026): Benoît Lauriou
- Area^{1}: 8.09 km^{2} (3.12 sq mi)
- Highest elevation: 73 m (240 ft)
- Lowest elevation: 2 m (6.6 ft)
- Population (2023): 1,669
  - Density: 206/km^{2} (534/sq mi)
- Time zone: UTC+01:00 (CET)
  - Summer (DST): UTC+02:00 (CEST)
- INSEE/Postal code: 29218 /29790
- ^{1} French Land Register data, which excludes lakes, ponds, glaciers > 1 km^{2} (0.386 sq mi or 247 acres) and river estuaries.

Pont-Croix (French pronunciation: [pɔ̃ kʁwa]; Breton: Pontekroaz) is a commune in the Finistère department of Brittany in north-western France.

The town lies about 5 km (3.1 mi) from Audierne on the road to Douarnenez and is connected to Plouhinec by a small, scenic road that passes through the Goyen valley.

== International relations ==
It is twinned with the civil Parish of Constantine in Kerrier, Cornwall.

== Population ==
Inhabitants of Pont-Croix are called in French Pontécruciens.

== Sights ==
From Pont-Croix, short trips can be made to Pointe du Raz, Pointe du Van, and Baie des Trépassés. The road to Audierne affords a view of the Goyen river valley.

The Monastery Church of Notre-Dame de Roscudon, which dates from the early 13th century, has a 67 m high spire that served as the model for the spires of Quimper Cathedral.

Pont-Croix's cobbled streets (Ruelles pavées) and medieval houses are located around a market and a church. The market is held every Thursday morning.

Other points of interest are:

- The Bridge over the River Goyen
- The Chapel of Saint Vincent

== Notable people ==
- Louise Magadur
- Cécile Corbel

== See also ==
- Communes of the Finistère department
