= Brigus South =

- Former community
- Location of Hopewell in Newfoundland
- Coordinates: 47°06′52″N 52°53′02″W
- Country: Canada
- Province: Newfoundland and Labrador

Population (2016)
  - Total: 83
- Time zone: UTC-3:30 (Newfoundland Time)
  - Summer (DST): UTC-2:30 (Newfoundland Daylight)
- Area code: 709

Brigus South is a local service district and designated place in the Canadian province of Newfoundland and Labrador on the Avalon Peninsula.

== History ==
An ancient fishing settlement situated between Witless Bay and Cape Broyle in a small cove. The earliest record (1636) on a map naming it Abra de Brigas, which translates as the harbour or harbour of turmoil and tides. The name stems from the French word brega of South west France because both Brigus and Brigus South are located in areas of French interest which contain other French names.

In the 1960s the name was changed to Hillsdale to distinguish it from Brigus, Conception Bay. Locals refused to acknowledge the new name and it was officially changed back 6 or 7 years later.

As the names and dates of various early maps suggest, Brigus South was known by French and Portuguese mariners in the 16th and 17th centuries. The first census of Brigus, then called Bercekus was taken in 1677, listing Richard Koane, John Kent and Nicholas Koane as residents. These families lodged in 3 separate dwellings, had 6 servants lodging with them as well as 43 fishing servants who were employed in the settlement. Bercekus had five stages, seven boats, 4 store houses and the largest number of horses (4) of any settlement from Renooze (Renews) to St. John's and constituted fully one third of all the horses in Newfoundland at the time.

It has been conjectured that the earliest settlers of the Community came to Brigus via the earlier settlements of Ferryland and Cape Broyle (1628–1630) and that there was a permanent settlement in 1700. In 1697 the Abbe Baudior listed 15 soldiers and 3 inhabitants (Richard Coome, John Kent and Nicholas Coome) and in 1705 the Community had 6 families. A cemetery was established and the first person buried there is a child of Jacob Doyle in 1798.

A ship called the Hammer, by locals, but officially named The John and Maria, went ashore in Timber Cove in 1857 with the loss of 18 men. All are buried in Brigus Cemetery. The Population reached an all-time high in 1894 with 140 residents.

A prominent man from Brigus, Thomas Battcock sat in the Newfoundland House of Assembly, from 1870 to 1873 having been elected as part of Charles Fox Bennett's anti-confederation government.

The first School was established in Brigus in 1848 but closed in 1884 due to the state of the building. The salary for the teacher was used to improve the quality of the lodgings. In 1885, the school reopened in a house rented by the School Board, it was purchased in 1859. A Miss Doyle was the teacher at that time. In 1870, a Miss Grace, tutor for the Cashin family of Cape Broyle taught school there. She was retired in 1904 due to her advancing years and given a pension. Mary Battcock taught from 1911 -1916 when Margaret Gregory took over to teach the sixteen students of all grades. The last teacher was Mrs. Annie Hayes 1937 -1967 when the school closed and the children were bussed to school in Cape Broyle.

A Chapel was erected in the Community under the direction of Father Michael Kennedy (date unknown).

== Geography ==
Brigus South is in Newfoundland within Subdivision U of Division No. 1.

== Demographics ==
As a designated place in the 2016 Census of Population conducted by Statistics Canada, Brigus South recorded a population of 83 living in 35 of its 72 total private dwellings, a change of −3.5% from its 2011 population of 86. With a land area of 6.36 km^{2} (2.46 sq mi), it had a population density of 13.1/km^{2} (33.8/sq mi) in 2016.

== Economy ==
The economy was based on small boat inshore fishery and reported a catch of 480 quintals of fish that year. On a census report dated 1697 it was reported that the settlement had "No sheep, garden or pasture lands" making it likely that it was first used as a fishing station between 1675 and 1677. The first dwellings were built on the East side of the harbour which could not be seen from the ocean. It was a good hideaway from the French and Spanish men of war and Pirate ships.

== Government ==
Brigus South is a local service district (LSD) that is governed by a committee responsible for the provision of certain services to the community.

== See also ==
- List of communities in Newfoundland and Labrador
- List of designated places in Newfoundland and Labrador
- List of local service districts in Newfoundland and Labrador
