= Newfoundland and Labrador Route 11 =

Highway in Newfoundland and Labrador, Canada

Route 11
- Petty Harbour Road; Main Road; Maddox Cove Road; Blackhead Road

Route information
- Maintained by Newfoundland and Labrador Department of Transportation and Infrastructure
- Length: 18.3 km (11.4 mi)

Major junctions
- South end: Route 10 in Goulds
- North end: Water Street / Leslie Street in St. John's

Location
- Country: Canada
- Province: Newfoundland and Labrador

Highway system
- Highways in Newfoundland and Labrador
← Route 10	→ Route 13

Route 11 is a 18.3-kilometre-long (11.4 mi) north-south highway located on the Avalon Peninsula of the island of Newfoundland in the Canadian province of Newfoundland and Labrador. It connects the town of Petty Harbour-Maddox Cove with Goulds and St. John's

== Route description ==
Route 11 begins as Petty Harbour Road in Goulds at an intersection with Route 10. It heads east up a narrow valley through neighbourhoods to leave Goulds and cross over a lake and wind its way through some mountains. The highway passes by Petty Harbour Generating Station before entering Petty Harbour-Maddox Cove. Route 11 passes through some neighbourhoods before entering downtown Petty Harbour and turning north along Main Road. It crosses over a creek before winding its way along some coastal cliffs. The highway then passes through the Maddox Cove portion of town before leaving Petty Harbour-Maddox Cove as Maddox Cove Road. Route 11 heads straight through rural wooded areas for several kilometres as it gains some elevation before coming to an intersection with Blackhead Road, with Route 11 turning west on that road. Blackhead Road continues east beyond this point to the community of Blackhead and Cape Spear. Route 11 continues northwest through rural areas for several kilometres to enter St. John's, where it winds its way through the Shea Heights neighbourhood for a few kilometres. It then makes a steep descent as it negotiates some sharp switchbacks to cross under Route 2 (Pitts Memorial Drive). The highway has an intersection with Southside Road at the bottom of the hill before crossing a river and coming to an end at an intersection with Water Street.

== Major intersections ==
Location	km	mi	Destinations	Notes
Goulds	0.0	0.0	Route 10 (Irish Loop Drive/Southern Shore Highway) to Route 2 – Bay Bulls, Witless Bay, St. John's	Southern terminus
	11.4	7.1	Blackhead Road - Blackhead, Cape Spear	
St. John's	18.3	11.4	Water Street To Route 60 – Downtown, Mount Pearl	Northern terminus; road continues as Leslie Street
1.000 mi = 1.609 km; 1.000 km = 0.621 mi

== Attractions along Route 11 ==
- Petty Harbour Generating Station
- Cape Spear

== See also ==
- List of highways numbered 11
