= Keith Hutchings =

Canadian politician

The Honourable Keith Hutchings ECNL

Minister of Municipal and Intergovernmental Affairs, Minister Responsible for the Labour relations Agency, And Registrar General of Newfoundland and Labrador
- In office 30 September 2014 – 14 December 2015
- Preceded by: Dan Crummell
- Succeeded by: Eddie Joyce

Member of the Newfoundland and Labrador House of Assembly for Ferryland
- In office 8 February 2007 – 17 April 2019
- Preceded by: Loyola Sullivan
- Succeeded by: Loyola O'Driscoll

Minister of Fisheries and Aquaculture of Newfoundland and Labrador
- In office 9 October 2013 – 30 September 2014
- Preceded by: Derrick Dalley
- Succeeded by: Vaughn Granter

Minister of Innovation, Business and Rural Development, Minister Responsible for the Research and Development Corporation, And Minister Responsible for the Rural Secretariat of Newfoundland and Labrador
- In office 28 October 2011 – 9 October 2013
- Preceded by: New office
- Succeeded by: Charlene Johnson

Minister responsible for the Office of Public Engagement, Deputy Government House Leader of Newfoundland and Labrador
- In office 19 October 2012 – 9 October 2013
- Preceded by: New office
- Succeeded by: Charlene Johnson

Personal details
- Born: 27 February Mobile, Newfoundland and Labrador
- Party: Progressive Conservative
- Spouse: Lynn Croft
- Occupation: Consultant

Keith Hutchings is former a Canadian politician in Newfoundland and Labrador. From 2007 until 2019, he represented the district of Ferryland in the Newfoundland and Labrador House of Assembly for the Progressive Conservative Party.

Hutchings served as the Minister of Municipal and Intergovernmental Affairs, Minister of Fisheries and Aquaculture, Minister of Innovation, Business and Rural Development, the Minister responsible for the Office of Public Engagement and the Deputy House Leader. Before entering cabinet in 2011, Hutchings had served as a Parliamentary Secretary in several government departments.

== Early life and career ==
Hutchings was born the youngest of six children in Mobile, a community on the south coast of the Avalon Peninsula. He attended Memorial University of Newfoundland (MUN) in St. John's where he completed a Bachelor of Arts degree, with a major in political science and a minor in history. Hutchings also has a Certificate in Public Administration from MUN, and has completed an Occupational Health and Safety Program from Ryerson Polytechnical Institute in Toronto, Ontario.

Hutchings spent 11 years working with the Workplace Health Safety and Compensation Commission. From 1996 to 1998 he served as Chief of Staff and Executive Assistant to Loyola Sullivan, then the Leader of the Official Opposition in the House of Assembly. Prior to entering politics he worked as a consultant. He also owned and operated IMPACC Consulting.

== Politics ==
=== Government backbencher ===
On 29 December 2006, Sullivan announced his resignation as Minister of Finance and as member of the House of Assembly (MHA) for Ferryland. Hutchings later announced he would seek the Progressive Conservative nomination in the district. He defeated seven other candidates to win the nomination, taking 1,135 votes out of the 2,902 ballots cast. In the by-election held on 8 February 2007, Hutchings took 75 per cent of the vote to hold the seat for the governing Progressive Conservatives, defeating candidates from both the Liberals and New Democrats. Eight months later he was re-elected in the October 9, 2007, provincial election, winning nearly 84 per cent of the popular vote.

Following his re-election Premier Danny Williams appointed him as the Parliamentary Secretary to the Minister of Human Resources, Labour and Employment. Two years later he became Parliamentary Secretary to the Minister of Health and Community Services. Hutchings was challenged by two others for the Progressive Conservative nomination in the lead up to the October 2011, provincial election. He easily secured the PC nomination for the October vote, taking 1,586 of the 2,367 votes cast. Hutchings was re-elected in the provincial election with 72 per cent of the popular vote.

=== Minister of Innovation, Business and Rural Development (2011-2013) ===
Hutchings was appointed as the minister of the newly formed Department of Innovation, Business and Rural Development on 28 October 2011. The new department was created by merging the Department of Business with the Department of Innovation, Trade and Rural Development.

In March 2012, the Canadian Broadcasting Corporation (CBC) revealed that in an eight-year period the government, through the now defunct Department of Business, had funnelled more than $20 million into grants, loans and the direct costs of business-attraction initiatives, with only moderate returns. A net benefit of fewer than 100 new jobs, a quarter of them seasonal, had been created. In the 2013, provincial budget the government consolidate more than 20 business investment programs under two umbrella funds – a Business Investment Fund and a Regional Development Fund. Hutchings said the move simplified the system for businesses and community groups, with one business advocate agreeing that this would make it easier for companies to get money.

Hutchings' department was also responsible for representing the provincial government during negotiations on the Canada-European Union Comprehensive Economic and Trade Agreement (CETA). The tentative trade agreement was announced on 18 October 2013, nine days after Hutchings became the province's Minister of Fisheries and Aquaculture. The fishery was the main issue in the trade negotiations for Newfoundland and Labrador. Hutchings, along with the new minister of IBRD, Charlene Johnson, and Minister of Natural Resources Derrick Dalley, announced the government's support for CETA on the day the tentative agreement was announced. The ministers said the trade agreement would a game changer for the fishing industry. The agreement would eliminate minimum processing requirements (MPRs) for the European Union three years after the ratification of the deal, which is expected to occur in 2015. In return for eliminating MPRs, high tariffs and import restrictions on almost all fish would be eliminated on the first day that CETA comes into effect. Currently only 13.1 per cent of seafood is duty-free. But by 2022, all seafood would be 100 per cent duty-free. Minimum process requirements is a policy in the province that requires fish caught off the coast of Newfoundland and Labrador to have a minimal level of processing done in provincial fish plants.

On 5 December 2013, Premier Dunderdale tabled 82 pages of correspondents regarding the CETA negotiations. Letters between Hutchings and the federal Minister of International Trade, Ed Fast, mainly dealt with minimum processing requirements and the negotiations that led to a $400 million fund for the provincial fishery. In return for eliminating MPRs for the European Union, which the federal government wanted, Hutchings tried to get Fast to agree to a number of proposals in return. These proposals included the federal government selling their equity stake in the Hibernia oil field to the province, enhancing search and rescue services, and enacting a separate safety regulator for the offshore oil industry. Fast would not agree to these proposals and countered with a $400 million fund to help fish plant workers who could possibly be affected by eliminating MPRs. The $400 million fund would be cost shared by both levels of government, with each contributing half. Hutchings and Fast eventually agreed that Ottawa would cover 70 per cent of the $400 million fund and that the money could be used in all aspects of the fishery.

==== Deputy House Leader and Office of Public Engagement (2012-2013) ====
In a cabinet shuffle held on 19 October 2012, Hutchings was appointed Deputy House Leader and Minister responsible for the Office of Public Engagement, while also retaining the Innovation, Business and Rural Development portfolio. The Office of Public Engagement was a newly formed office that would become responsible for the Rural Secretariat, the Voluntary and Non-Profit Secretariat, the Youth Engagement office, the Strategic Partnership Initiative, and the Access to Information and Protection of Privacy Office. The office was formed after the government faced considerable backlash for changes made to the Access to Information and Protection of Privacy Act.

One of the first major initiatives by the Office of Public Engagement, in partnership with the Department of Service NL, was to post restaurant health and sanitation inspection reports online. Previously the information was only available upon request to Service NL. At this time Hutchings said that he had directed officials to find other areas whereby there could be routine disclosure of information. At a news conference on 23 April 2013, Hutchings announced that completed access-to-information requests would now be posted online, as well as orders in council. Newfoundland and Labrador became one of the last provinces to post orders in council online, and the government had recently been criticized for their lack of disclosure of them. At the news conference Hutchings said that the government would look at routinely disclosing all contracts, grants and contributions above a certain dollar amount, but had no time frame to do so.

=== Minister of Fisheries and Aquaculture (2013-2014) ===
In a cabinet shuffle held on 9 October 2013, Premier Dunderdale appointed Hutchings to the portfolio of Fisheries and Aquaculture. Hutchings replaced Derrick Dalley who was appointed Minister of Natural Resources, after just one year at Fisheries and Aquaculture. Following his appointment a representative with the Fish, Food and Allied Workers (FFAW), the union representing workers in the fishery, said he hoped to see Hutchings stay in the portfolio longer than his predecessors. Hutchings was the seventh minister appointed to the Department of Fisheries and Aquaculture in ten years.

On 30 October 2013, Hutchings joined Premier Dunderdale at The Rooms in St. John's to announce the $400 million fund for the fishery, which he had negotiated as Minister of Innovation, Business and Rural Development. $280 million of the fund would be covered by the federal government while the province would provide the additional $120 million. The money would not be in place till after the trade agreement was finalized, which would likely be in 2015. The government did not have a specific plan on how they would spend the money, and planned on using the next two years on figuring that out.

=== Minister of Municipal and Intergovernmental Affairs ===
On 30 September 2014, Hutchings was appointed Minister of Municipal and Intergovernmental Affairs by Premier Paul Davis . As Minister of Intergovernmental Affairs, Hucthings travelled to Ottawa with Premier Davis to meet Prime Minister Stephen Harper on 12 December 2014. The meeting was to discuss the province's concerns over the $400 million fisheries fund that Hutchings had helped negotiate as part of Canada's free trade agreement with the European Union. The province was concerned that the federal government was placing new stipulations on their portion of the fund which would make it nearly impossible for the province to access. After their meeting Premier Davis stated "we cannot trust Stephen Harper, cannot trust this government."

=== Opposition (2015-2019) ===
The Davis government was defeated in the 2015 provincial election, although Hutchings was re-elected in Ferryland. He was subsequently appointed by the PC Caucus as Opposition House Leader in the House of Assembly. He did not run for re-election in the 2019 election.

== Electoral history ==
2015 Newfoundland and Labrador general election
Party	Candidate	Votes	%
Progressive Conservative	Keith Hutchings	3,093	49.83
Liberal	Jeff Marshall	2,550	41.08
New Democratic	Mona Rossiter	564	9.09
Total valid votes		6,207	100.00

2011 Newfoundland and Labrador general election
Party	Candidate	Votes	%	±%
Progressive Conservative	Keith Hutchings	3,640	72.15	-11.65
NDP	Chris Molloy	1.224	24.26	+17.35
Liberal	Dianne Randell	181	3.59	-5.7

2007 Newfoundland and Labrador general election
Party	Candidate	Votes	%	±%
Progressive Conservative	Keith Hutchings	4,256	83.8	+8.7
Liberal	Kevin Bennett	472	9.29	-10.9
NDP	Grace Bavington	351	6.91	+1.95

Ferryland byelection February 8, 2007
Party	Candidate	Votes	%	±%
Progressive Conservative	Keith Hutchings	2,770	75.10	-11.24
Liberal	Kevin Bennett	715	19.38	+10.97
NDP	Rick Boland	183	4.96	-0.19
