= Loyola Sullivan =

Canadian politician (born 1949)

The Honourable Loyola Sullivan ECNL
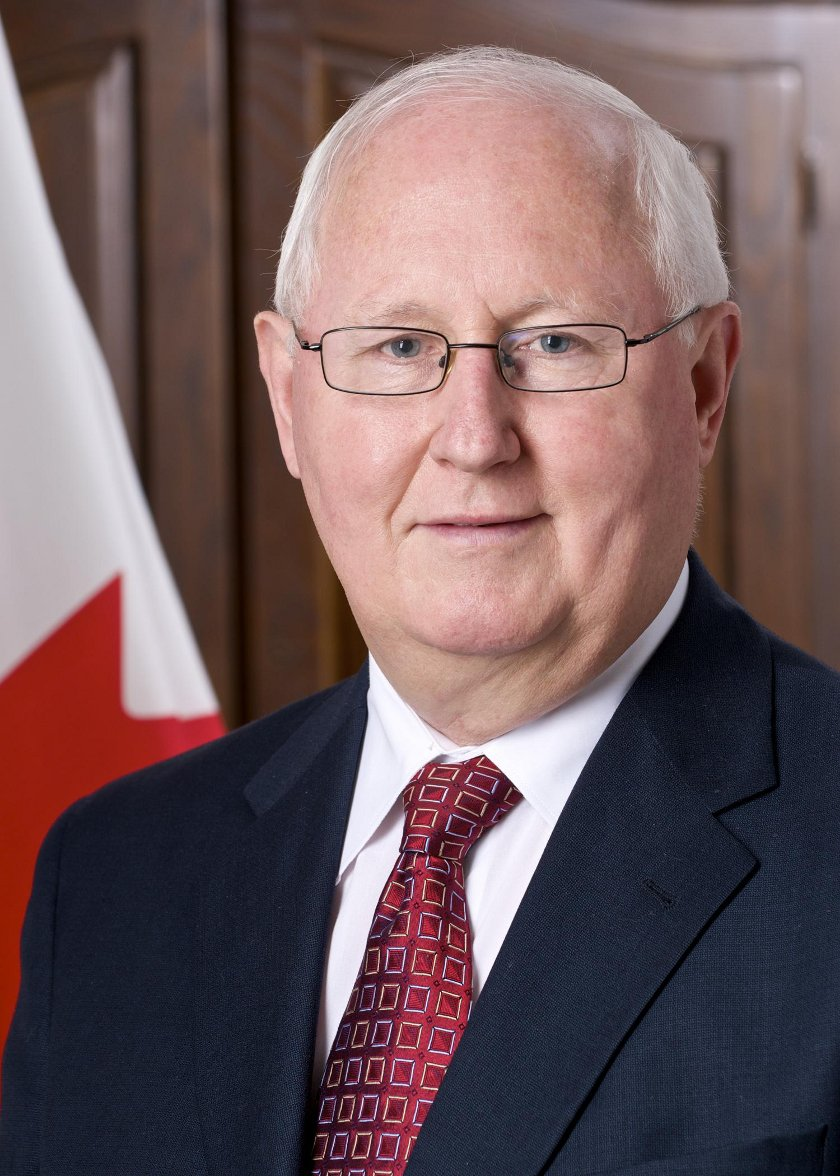

Ambassador for Fisheries Conservation of Canada
- In office January 25, 2007 – March 28, 2011

Minister of Finance, President of the Treasury Board, Government House leader, And Minister of Health and Community Services of Newfoundland and Labrador
- In office 2003–2006
- Preceded by: Joan-Marie Alyward
- Succeeded by: Tom Marshall

Member of the Newfoundland and Labrador House of Assembly for Ferryland
- In office 1992–2007
- Preceded by: Charlie Power
- Succeeded by: Keith Hutchings

Interim leader of the Progressive Conservative Party of Newfoundland and Labrador
- In office 1996–1998
- Preceded by: Lynn Verge
- Succeeded by: Ed Byrne

Mayor of Fermeuse
- In office 1979–1982

Personal details
- Born: April 3, 1949 (age 77) Calvert, Newfoundland
- Party: Conservative Party of Canada, Progressive Conservative
- Spouse: Verna Sullivan (nee Walsh)
- Children: Julie, Shelley and Stefan
- Education: Memorial University of Newfoundland
- Occupation: Businessman and Educator

Loyola Sullivan (born April 3, 1949) served as Canada's Ambassador for Fisheries Conservation from 2007 until 2011 and is a former Member of the House of Assembly in Newfoundland and Labrador. Sullivan represented the district of Ferryland from 1992 till 2006.

Sullivan was Leader of the Official Opposition between 1996 and 1998. When the Progressive Conservative (PC) Party came to power in 2003 he was appointed by Premier Danny Williams as the Minister of Finance and President of the Treasury Board and later as the Government House Leader.

== Background ==
=== Early life and education ===
Loyola Sullivan was born on April 3, 1949, in Calvert, Newfoundland on the Southern Shore of the island of Newfoundland. Sullivan is the son of a fisherman and one of 12 children, who learned from an early age the importance of hard work; he started working summers in the local fish plant when he was 13 years old. He received his primary and elementary education in Calvert and attended high school in Ferryland where he graduated with honours at the top of his class. Sullivan attended Memorial University of Newfoundland (MUN) where he obtained Bachelor of Science degree in 1971 and Bachelor of Education degree in 1974.

=== Family and career ===
He is married to Verna Walsh of Fermeuse and together they have three children, Julie, Shelley and Stefan and six grandchildren. Sullivan became a high school biology, math and chemistry teacher, at Baltimore High School in Ferryland and was an owner and operator of two fish-processing operations as well as several other small businesses.

=== Volunteer work ===
Sullivan served as the mayor of Fermeuse from 1979 to 1982 and was the President of the Southern Shore Arena Association from 1988 to 1991. Sullivan was also the Southern Shore Recreation Director, the coach of 12 provincial high school championships in cross-country, wrestling and hockey, as well as coaching the Newfoundland and Labrador junior wrestling team in the 1972 Canadian championship and Olympic trials.

Sullivan was a long-time member of the Kinsmen Club of Canada, rising to serve as National President of the organization in 1986. He served on a wide-variety of community committees and boards including the Regional Arena Association, the Southern Shore Athletic Association, the Regional Oil and Gas Impact Committee, and the Committee for Primary Health Care -A Nursing Model, for which he was recognized with the Canada Volunteer Award of Merit.

== Politics ==
=== In opposition ===
Sullivan was first elected to the Newfoundland and Labrador legislature in a 1992 by-election and was subsequently re-elected in the next four general elections. From 1996 to 1998, he served as Leader of the Official Opposition and interim leader of the Progressivce Conservatives, taking over for Lynn Verge who had lost her seat in the 1996 general election. Sullivan did not lead the PC Party through an election campaign and was replaced as leader by Ed Byrne in 1998. During his time in Opposition he also served as Party Whip, Deputy House Leader, Chair of the Public Accounts Committee, and critic for Health, Education, Finance and Treasury Board.

=== In government ===
When the Progressive Conservatives formered the government after the 2003 general election Sullivan was appointed Minister of Finance and President of the Treasury Board. In that role, he led the negotiations for the 2005 Atlantic Accord and successfully secured the $2 billion agreement for the province. In 2006 he also took on the responsibility as Government House Leader, he served in both these roles till he retired from provincial politics in December 2006. The next month on January 25, 2007, Sullivan was appointed by the federal Ministers of Foreign Affairs and Fisheries and Oceans as Ambassador for Fisheries Conservation by the Government of Canada. Sullivan spent the four years furthering Canada's position on global fishery issues meeting with foreign fisheries ministers, ambassadors, foreign government and industry representatives to advance Canada's international fisheries agenda.

=== Federal politics ===
Sullivan announced on March 29, 2011, that he had resigned his post as Canada's Ambassador for Fisheries Conservation in order to seek the Conservative Party of Canada nomination in the riding of St. John's South-Mount Pearl for the 2011 federal election. On May 2, Sullivan placed third receiving 8,883 votes.

== Electoral history ==
St. John's South—Mount Pearl - 2011 Canadian federal election
Party	Candidate	Votes	%	±%
New Democratic	Ryan Cleary	18,681	47.92	–
Liberal	Siobhán Coady	11,130	28.55	–
Conservative	Loyola Sullivan	8,883	22.79	–
Green	Rick Austin	291	0.75	–

2003 Newfoundland and Labrador general election
Party	Candidate	Votes	%	±%
Progressive Conservative	Loyola Sullivan	5182	86.28%	–
Liberal	Andrea Kavanagh	504	8.39%	
NDP	Lois Martin	309	5.14%	
Independent	Pilar Riego-Hickey	11	0.18%	

1999 Newfoundland and Labrador general election
Party	Candidate	Votes	%	±%
Progressive Conservative	L Sullivan	4482	66.20%	–
Liberal	H Mullowney	2141	31.62%	
NDP	G Ryan	147	2.17%	

1996 Newfoundland and Labrador general election
Party	Candidate	Votes	%	±%
Progressive Conservative	L Sullivan	4834	68.36%	–
Liberal	T Best	2237	31.63%	

1993 Newfoundland and Labrador general election
Party	Candidate	Votes	%	±%
Progressive Conservative	L Sullivan	3675	74.00%	–
Liberal	MC O'Brien	1125	22.65%	
NDP	V Silk	166	0.32%	
