= Cashel Lookout Formation =

- Stratigraphic range: Neoproterozoic
- Type: Formation
- Unit of: Marystown Group

Lithology
- Primary: Felsic volcanics

Location
- Region: Newfoundland and Labrador
- Country: Canada
- Occurrence of the Cashel Lookout Formation in southeastern Newfoundland

The Cashel Lookout Formation is a formation cropping out in Newfoundland, that can be observed along Route 11 north of Marystown.
