= Witless Bay (bay) =

Natural bay in Newfoundland and Labrador, Canada

Coordinates: 47.266°N 52.798°W

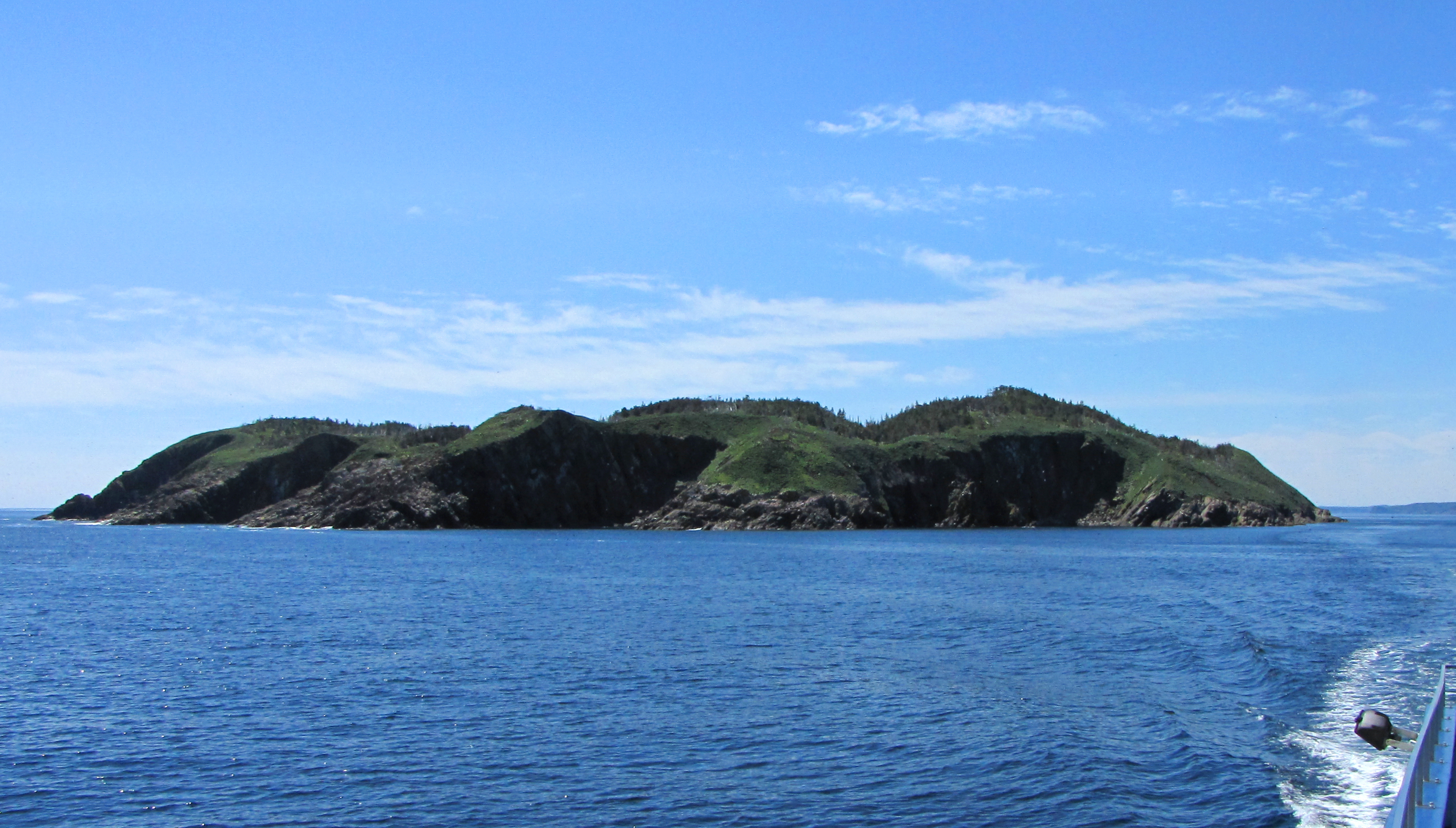
Gull Island in Witless Bay

Witless Bay is a natural bay off of the island of Newfoundland in the province of Newfoundland and Labrador, Canada. It is located on the eastern coast of the Avalon Peninsula, south of Bay Bulls and north of La Manche Provincial Park.
