= St. Shott's =

- Town
- Location of St. Shott's in Newfoundland
- Coordinates: 46°37′58″N 53°35′14″W
- Country: Canada
- Province: Newfoundland and Labrador

Area
  - Land: 1.14 km^{2} (0.44 sq mi)

Population (2021)
  - Total: 55
- Time zone: UTC-3:30 (Newfoundland Time)
  - Summer (DST): UTC-2:30 (Newfoundland Daylight)
- Area code: 709
- Highways: Route 10

St. Shott's is the southernmost town in the Canadian province of Newfoundland and Labrador. In the Canada 2021 Census, the town had a population of 55.

St. Shott's is accessible by road via St. Shott's Road (Route 10–52), connecting the town with Route 10 (Irish Loop Drive).

== Demographics ==
In the 2021 Census of Population conducted by Statistics Canada, St. Shott's had a population of 55 living in 34 of its 50 total private dwellings, a change of −16.7% from its 2016 population of 66. With a land area of 1.07 km^{2} (0.41 sq mi), it had a population density of 51.4/km^{2} (133.1/sq mi) in 2021.

== Shipwrecks ==
The town has had numerous shipwrecks occur in the waters off its coast over the last five centuries. The Dutch steamship "Anton van Driel" ran aground on a foggy day while en route from Nova Scotia to Rotterdam in the Netherlands. Of the 30 individuals on board, only three survived drowning after being rescued by a tugboat, and only one body was ever recovered, that of a man named Hajo de Jonge.

== Climate ==
St. Shott's has an extremely water moderated subarctic climate (Dfc). At sea level, this climate is the second closest to the equator in the Northern Hemisphere, behind the Kuril Islands. Due to the moderating effect of the Atlantic Ocean and Labrador Current, extreme maxima and minima are very limited. Summers are almost nonexistent, with temperatures above 21 °C (70 °F) being very rare. Winters are very mild by Canadian standards but can last half of the year or more some years. Any snow that falls is usually melted by falling rain, and ends up either completely melted or as leftover slush. Days with highs above 20 °C (68 °F) average 1.9, and with highs below 0 °C (32 °F) average 57.8. The highest record snowfall was 25.8 cm (10.2 in) and occurred on January 26, 1987. The highest recorded snow depth was 164 cm (65 in) and occurred on March 14, 1987. Precipitation is very heavy year round at nearly 1,520 mm (60 in).

Climate data for St. Shott's
| Month | Jan | Feb | Mar | Apr | May | Jun | Jul | Aug | Sep | Oct | Nov | Dec | Year |
|---|---|---|---|---|---|---|---|---|---|---|---|---|---|
| Record high °C (°F) | 9.5 (49.1) | 9.0 (48.2) | 12.5 (54.5) | 17.5 (63.5) | 17.5 (63.5) | 21.0 (69.8) | 24.0 (75.2) | 23.5 (74.3) | 23.0 (73.4) | 19.4 (66.9) | 14.0 (57.2) | 11.5 (52.7) | 24.0 (75.2) |
| Mean daily maximum °C (°F) | 0.1 (32.2) | −0.8 (30.6) | 1.0 (33.8) | 4.4 (39.9) | 7.8 (46.0) | 11.3 (52.3) | 14.9 (58.8) | 16.8 (62.2) | 14.7 (58.5) | 10.6 (51.1) | 6.5 (43.7) | 2.3 (36.1) | 7.5 (45.4) |
| Daily mean °C (°F) | −3.1 (26.4) | −3.9 (25.0) | −1.9 (28.6) | 1.7 (35.1) | 4.8 (40.6) | 8.2 (46.8) | 12.2 (54.0) | 14.0 (57.2) | 11.7 (53.1) | 7.6 (45.7) | 3.7 (38.7) | −0.7 (30.7) | 4.5 (40.2) |
| Mean daily minimum °C (°F) | −6.2 (20.8) | −7 (19) | −4.7 (23.5) | −1.1 (30.0) | 1.7 (35.1) | 5.1 (41.2) | 9.4 (48.9) | 11.1 (52.0) | 8.8 (47.8) | 4.6 (40.3) | 0.9 (33.6) | −3.6 (25.5) | 1.6 (34.8) |
| Record low °C (°F) | −19.5 (−3.1) | −23.3 (−9.9) | −26.0 (−14.8) | −11.0 (12.2) | −8.0 (17.6) | −2.5 (27.5) | 0.0 (32.0) | 0.0 (32.0) | −2.2 (28.0) | −8.0 (17.6) | −12.0 (10.4) | −19.3 (−2.7) | −26.0 (−14.8) |
| Average precipitation mm (inches) | 142.1 (5.59) | 104.0 (4.09) | 126.5 (4.98) | 113.5 (4.47) | 110.9 (4.37) | 129.1 (5.08) | 122.7 (4.83) | 111.5 (4.39) | 139.1 (5.48) | 144.1 (5.67) | 137.7 (5.42) | 131.7 (5.19) | 1,512.9 (59.56) |
| Average rainfall mm (inches) | 108.1 (4.26) | 72.2 (2.84) | 105.5 (4.15) | 109.0 (4.29) | 110.1 (4.33) | 129.1 (5.08) | 122.7 (4.83) | 111.5 (4.39) | 139.1 (5.48) | 144.0 (5.67) | 134.6 (5.30) | 115.4 (4.54) | 1,401.3 (55.16) |
| Average snowfall cm (inches) | 34 (13) | 31.7 (12.5) | 21 (8.3) | 4.5 (1.8) | 0.8 (0.3) | 0 (0) | 0 (0) | 0 (0) | 0 (0) | 0.1 (0.0) | 3.1 (1.2) | 16.3 (6.4) | 111.5 (43.5) |

== See also ==
- List of cities and towns in Newfoundland and Labrador
