= Aquaforte =

- Town
- Location of Aquaforte in Newfoundland
- Coordinates: 47°00′22″N 52°57′34″W
- Country: Canada
- Province: Newfoundland and Labrador
- Incorporated: 1972

Government
  - Mayor: Deborah Windsor

Population (2021)
  - Total: 74
- Time zone: UTC-3:30 (Newfoundland Time)
  - Summer (DST): UTC-2:30 (Newfoundland Daylight)
- Area code: 709
- Highways: Route 10

Aquaforte is a town on the south shore of Newfoundland's Avalon Peninsula in the province of Newfoundland and Labrador, Canada.

The town's economy has always rested primarily on fishing. The harbour has been used as a seasonal fishing station since the 1670s. British and French hostilities played out in harbors all along the Avalon Peninsula in the 18th century, and Aquaforte was no exception. However, the first permanent residents did not settle in Aquaforte until the early 1800s. It is located 4 miles (6.4 km) from Ferryland and 40 miles (64 km) from St. John's by water. It has one of the safest harbors in the island and cod was its main industry. In 1902 a resident from Norway, Anders Ellefsen, constructed a factory to process whales in the community. The plant operated for a few years but had to shut down around 1908 because of a decline in the whale population. It was incorporated as a community in 1972.

The Aquaforte post office's postal code, A0A 1A0, is the lowest (alphabetically and numerically first) of any central office in Canada.

== Demographics ==
In the 2021 Census of Population conducted by Statistics Canada, Aquaforte had a population of 74 living in 43 of its 63 total private dwellings, a change of −7.5% from its 2016 population of 80. With a land area of 6.88 km^{2} (2.66 sq mi), it had a population density of 10.8/km^{2} (27.9/sq mi) in 2021.

Census	Population
1836	125
1869	213
1891	172
1921	233
1996	172
2001	133
2006	103
2011	83
2016	80

== See also ==
- List of cities and towns in Newfoundland and Labrador
