= Biscay Bay =

Coordinates: 46.743°N 53.292°W

- Local service district
- Interactive map of Biscay Bay
- Country: Canada
- Province: Newfoundland and Labrador
- Region: Southern Avalon Peninsula

Population (2006)
  - Total: 65
- Highways: Route 10

Biscay Bay is a local service district in the Canadian province of Newfoundland and Labrador.

== Origin of Name ==
This name appears as early as 1675 in The English Pilot, a guide to navigation. At the time, Basques were called "Biscayans", and the bay was used by the early Basque fishermen.

== History ==
There is very little known about Biscay Bay before 1845, but most of the land area of Biscay Bay was owned by William D. Jackson, an English merchant, when Thomas Ryan of Trepassey (originally from Ireland) went to live there in that year. Other families at the time were the Easemans and Whites.

== Geography ==
Biscay Bay is in Newfoundland within Subdivision V of Division No. 1.

== Economy ==
The census of 1857 shows Biscay Bay with 4.5 acres (18,000 m^{2}) of improved land producing 20 barrels of potatoes and three tons of hay.

When Jackson died, his daughter Caroline decided to go back to live in England. She sold the land to Thomas Ryan and Richard Hartery for 150 pounds.

Residents farmed root crops and hay, raised sheep, cattle and pigs and also fished for cod inshore. It was not until the early 1930s that the road made much difference to the community and most transportation was by water. The community averaged 600 quintals of saltfish annually in the late 1930s and early 1940s, but 1943 was a good year when 970 quintals were made and sold for $12.50 per quintal.

Very heavy timber grew along the shore of Path End, but as the years went by, it became necessary to go further and further inland to get wood. Today, Biscay Bay is almost void of trees. The area boasted abundant partridge berries, bakeapples, rabbits, partridges, eider duck, fox, beaver, muskrat and weasel. The coming of the branch railway in 1913 added extra impetus to the area, as it had a sawmill in 1920.

== Government ==
Biscay Bay is a local service district (LSD) that is governed by a committee responsible for the provision of certain services to the community. The chair of the LSD committee is Yvonne Skinner.

== See also ==
- List of communities in Newfoundland and Labrador
- List of local service districts in Newfoundland and Labrador
