= Loyola O'Driscoll =

Canadian politician

The Honourable Loyola O'Driscoll ECNL MHA
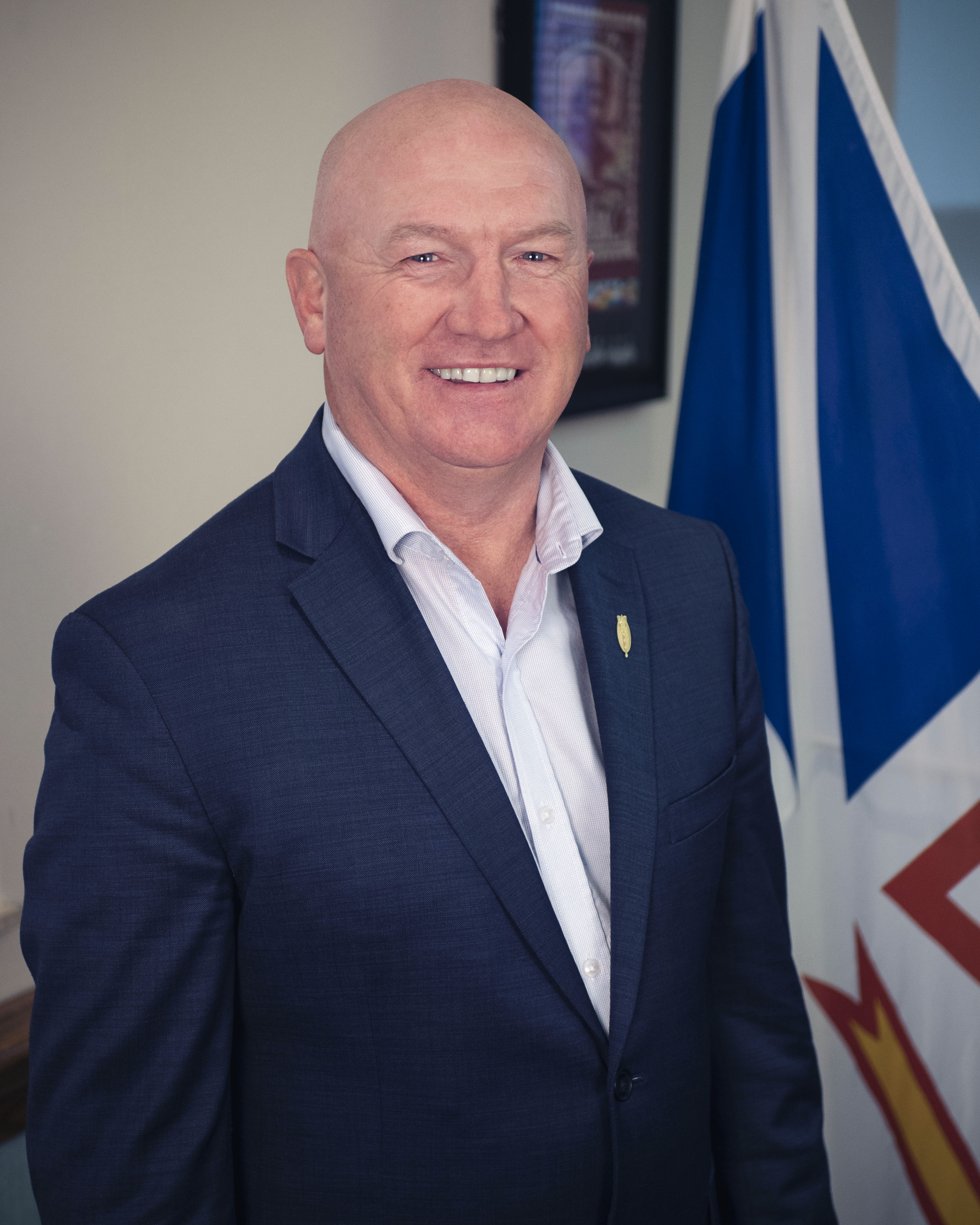
- Loyola O'Driscoll in 2020

Member of the Newfoundland and Labrador House of Assembly for Ferryland
- Incumbent
- Assumed office May 16, 2019
- Preceded by: Keith Hutchings

Minister of Fisheries and Aquaculture
- Incumbent
- Assumed office October 29, 2025
- Preceded by: Lisa Dempster

Personal details
- Born: Bay Bulls, Newfoundland and Labrador
- Party: Progressive Conservative

Loyola O'Driscoll is a Canadian politician, who was elected to the Newfoundland and Labrador House of Assembly in the 2019 provincial election. He represents the electoral district of Ferryland as a member of the Newfoundland and Labrador Progressive Conservative Party. He was re-elected in the 2021 provincial election. O'Driscoll supported Tony Wakeham in the 2023 provincial PC party leadership race.

Prior to politics, O'Driscoll worked for Hickman Motors.

O'Driscoll was re-elected in the 2025 Newfoundland and Labrador general election.

On October 29, 2025, O'Driscoll was appointed Minister of Fisheries and Aquaculture.

On September 17, 2026, O'Driscoll voted to approve the Churchill Falls Definitive Cooperation and Implementation Agreement (DCIA) in the House of Assembly along with the PC caucus.

== Election results ==
2025 Newfoundland and Labrador general election: Ferryland
Party	Candidate	Votes	%	±%
Progressive Conservative	Loyola O'Driscoll	3,507	52.7%	+0.37
Liberal	Cheryl O'Brien	2,904	43.6%	-0.53
New Democratic	Josh Meadus	243	3.7%	+0.16
Total valid votes				
Total rejected ballots				
Turnout				
Eligible voters				
Progressive Conservative hold		Swing		+0.5%

2021 Newfoundland and Labrador general election: Ferryland
Party	Candidate	Votes	%	±%
Progressive Conservative	Loyola O'Driscoll	3,197	52.33	-8.26
Liberal	Cheryl O'Brien	2,696	44.13	+9.18
New Democratic	Paul Murphy	216	3.54	
Total valid votes		6,109	99.45	
Total rejected ballots		34	0.55	
Turnout		6,143	58.69	
Eligible voters		10,467		
Progressive Conservative hold		Swing		-8.72
Source(s) "Officially Nominated Candidates General Election 2021" (PDF). Elections Newfoundland and Labrador. "NL Election 2021 Report" (PDF).

2019 Newfoundland and Labrador general election
Party	Candidate	Votes	%	±%
Progressive Conservative	Loyola O'Driscoll	4,074	60.6	+10.8
Liberal	Janice Ryan	2,350	34.9	-6.2
Independent	Chris Molloy	300	4.5	–
Total valid votes		6,724	100	
Total rejected ballots		52		
Turnout		6,776	69.3	+7.0
Eligible voters		9,782		
