= Baie des Trépassés =

Bay on the west coast of Finistère, in Brittany, France

Coordinates: 48°2′48.83″N 4°42′24.65″W

Aerial view

Baie des Trépassés (Breton: Bae an Anaon, French: Baie des Trépassés), or the Bay of the Dead, is a bay on Cap Sizun on the west coast of Finistère, in Brittany, France. The bay is located between Pointe du Raz and Pointe du Van, on the territory of the commune of Plogoff.

The bay has a wide sandy beach, and is a popular surfing location.

The name appears to be derived from a misinterpretation of the Breton avon, meaning "river", for anaon, meaning "the dead". There are legends (possibly derived from the name) that dead druids were ferried from here to be buried on the island of Sein.

== See also ==
- Trepassey Bay
