= Trepassey =

Trepassey Trépassés (Dead Men)
- Town
- Nicknames: Bay of Dead Men, Bay of Souls, River of Roses, The Golden Grove
- Location of Trepassey in Newfoundland
- Coordinates: 46°44.2′N 53°21.80′W
- Country: Canada
- Province: Newfoundland and Labrador
- Settled: 1617

Area
  - Total: 55.81 km^{2} (21.55 sq mi)

Population (2021)
  - Total: 405
  - Density: 8.6/km^{2} (22/sq mi)
- Time zone: UTC-3:30 (Newfoundland Time)
  - Summer (DST): UTC-2:30 (Newfoundland Daylight)
- Area code: 709
- Highways: Route 10

Trepassey (46°44.2′N 53°21.80′W) is a small fishing community located in Trepassey Bay on the south eastern corner of the Avalon Peninsula of Newfoundland and Labrador. It was in Trepassey Harbour where the flight of the Friendship took off, with Amelia Earhart on board, the first woman to fly across the Atlantic Ocean.

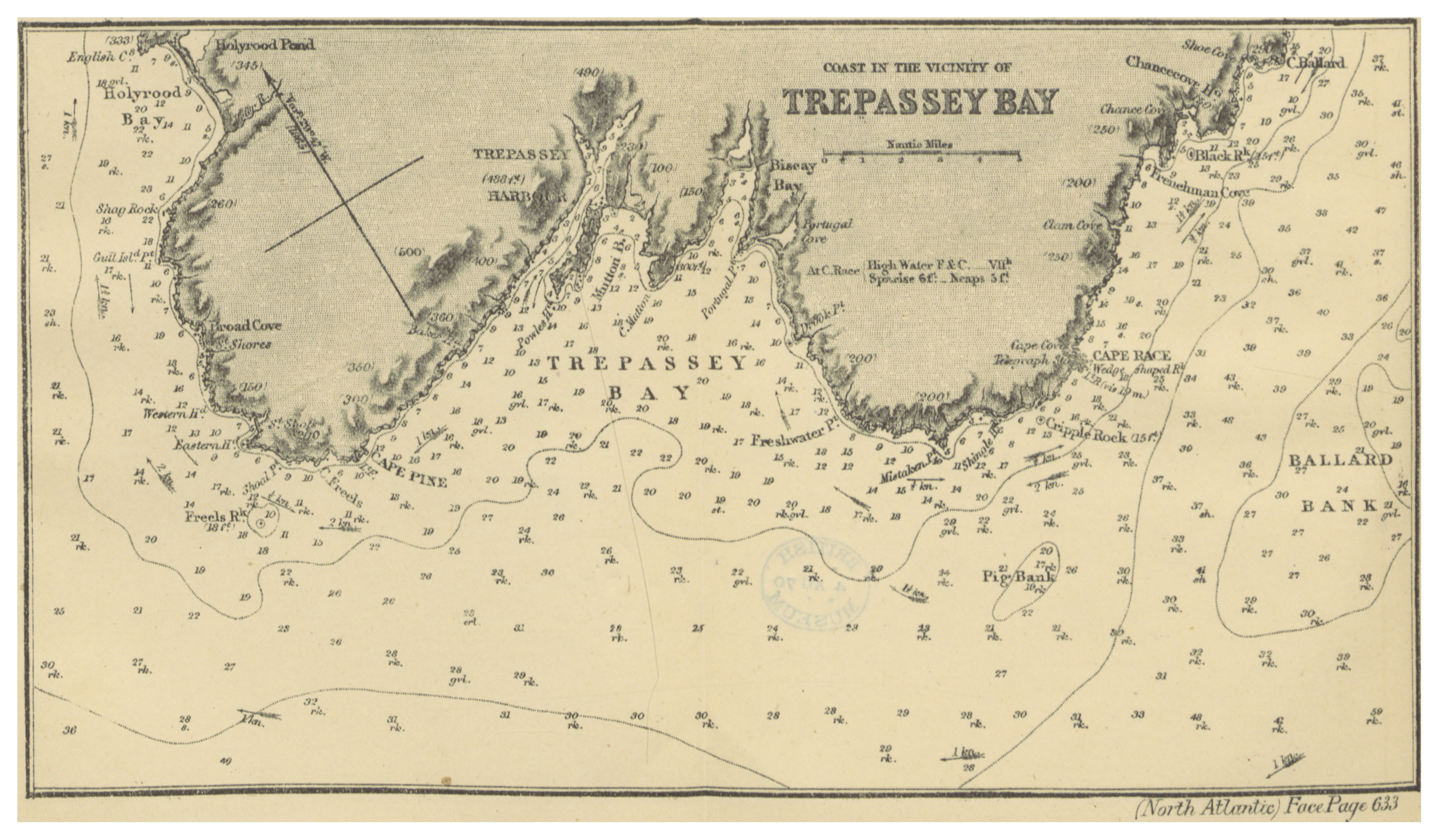
Trepassey, 1869

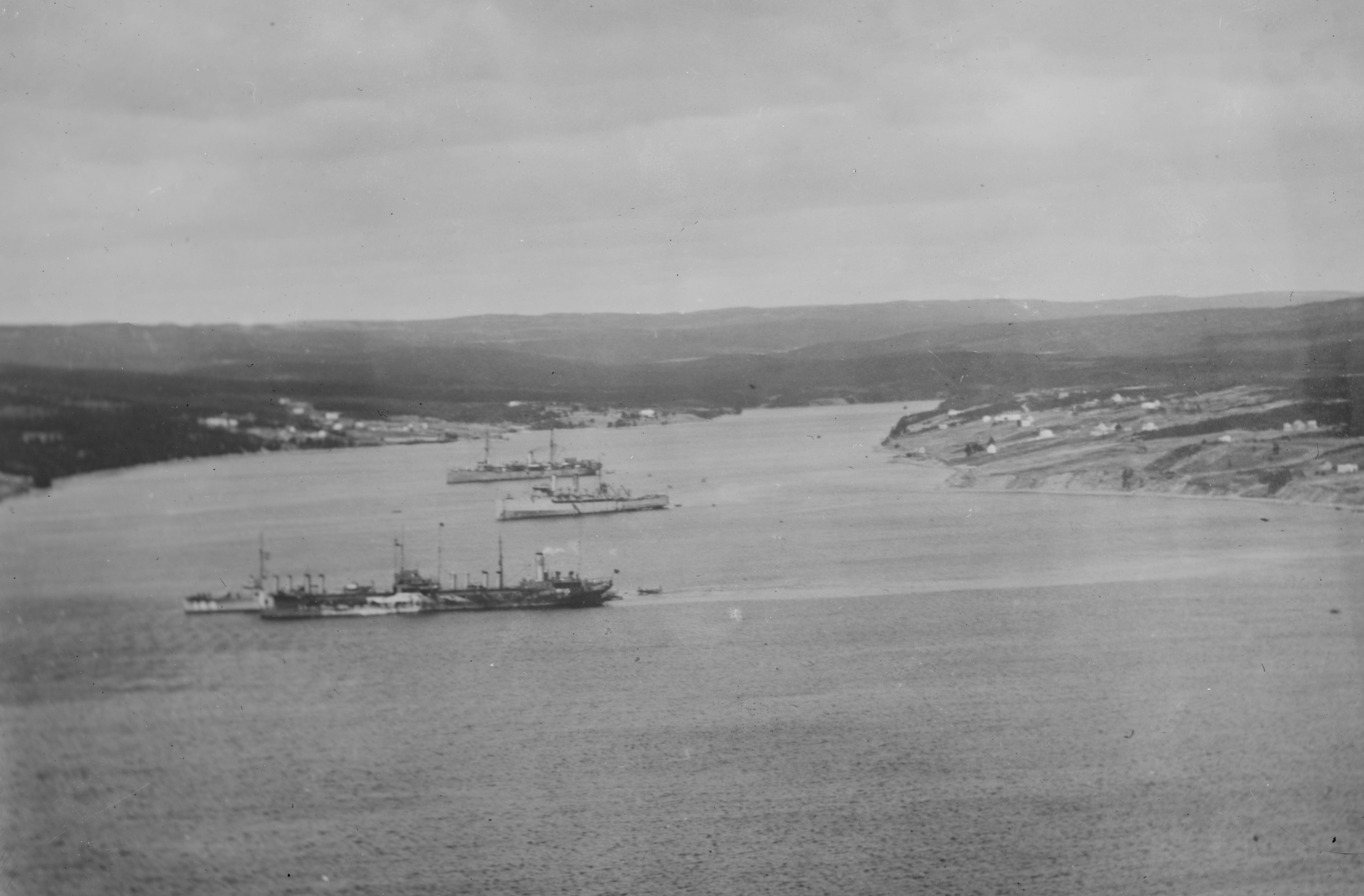
U.S. Navy ships in Trepassey Bay, May 1919.

== History ==
Trepassey originates from the French word trépassés (dead men), named after Baie des Trépassés on the Brittany coast of France. It is believed that it acquired this name due to the many shipwrecks that have occurred off its coast. Trepassey is the name of the harbour, the bay and the community. Later the translation was used as 'Dead Man's Bay' due to the tragic shipwrecks along the coast. Alternatively, the 'tre' element of the name could come from the Welsh word for 'town', explained by the Welsh influence of the Vaughan family.

French explorer Jacques Cartier passed through Trepassey Bay during his second voyage of exploration in 1536. Later, French, Spanish and Portuguese lived and fished near the area. Early English settlement attempts failed, and it was not until the latter part of the 17th century that the French settled the area. In 1702, during The War of The Spanish Succession, Commodore John Leake of the Royal Navy entered the harbour as part of a large naval expedition aimed at raiding numerous French settlements. Leake captured many French fishing ships and attacked French fishing stations, destroying them and driving the French from Trepassey. Until the Treaty of Utretch was signed, Trepassey was the sole settlement where English and French borders in Newfoundland met. Later fishermen from the West Country of England arrived, to be followed by large numbers of Irish and by the 1770s the Irish formed the majority of the population.

In the decades following the Second World War, the fishing industry boomed in Trepassey, and the town became increasingly affluent. However, its prosperity declined in 1991 with the closing of the local fish plant, which put hundreds out of work.

=== Timeline ===
- 1505, Trepassey first appears on European maps as a supply depot. It becomes known to early Portuguese explorers as "Rio das Rosas" or "River of Roses". Trepassey, from the 16th century onward, becomes a port for English, French and Iberian fishing fleets on the Grand Banks to resupply before returning across the Atlantic.
- 1600s, Trepassey marks the area where the French and Welsh areas of influence in Newfoundland meet.
- 1610s-20s, first attempt to permanently settle Trepassey and establish a plantation possibly made by Sir William Vaughan.
- 1620s-50s, The French also eventually settle the area, calling it "La Baie des Trépassés" or "Bay of Souls". Over time, the name "Trépassés" became anglicized into "Trepassey". Samuel de Champlain wrote of how useful the settlement was for catching and drying fish.
- 1652, The English, after settling the area at an unknown time, live side by side with the French.
- 1675, the French occupy one part of the Trepassey harbour and the English the other side.
- 1670s, the Periman or Perriman brothers from North Devon, arrive in Trepassey and operate a successful fishing plantation.
- 1681, the French prohibit the Basques from fishing in or near Trepassey.
- 1690s, after mounting tensions, the English are forced out of Trepassey by the French.
- 1702, Commodore John Leake heads for Trepassey as part a series of English raids along Newfoundland's coast. Leake had learned of several French fishing ships in Trepassey from the English colonists in Bay Bulls. Leake captures not only the French ships but also destroys multiple French fishing stages, effectively driving the French from Trepassey once and for all.
- 1713, the Treaty of Utrecht gives complete control of Newfoundland to Great Britain.
- 1720, on 21 June, the pirate Bartholomew Roberts approaches Trepassey, finding 172 merchant and fishing ships at anchor. Despite the ships having about forty cannons of various size between them, Roberts takes command of the harbour without opposition. He then burns 22 of the vessels and commandeers a brigantine from Bristol, before departing.
- 1767, Trepassey Bay is surveyed and mapped by the British cartographer end explorer, James Cook.
- 1779, a coastal artillery battery of six guns is constructed in order to repel Continental privateers during the American Revolutionary War. Other coastal batteries constructed at about the same time along the Southern Shore included St Mary's, Renews, Port Kirwan, Ferryland and Bay Bulls.
- 1797, the principal merchants of Trepassey sign a petition sent to the Governor in St. John's for the rebuilding of the coastal battery.
- 1813, Trepassey's battery is refitted with two 9-pounder cannons.
- 1815, Trepassey's battery falls out of use at the end of the Napoleonic Wars.
- 1821, the first lighthouse is built at Cape Pine, the southernmost point in Newfoundland.
- 1836, the population is listed as 247.
- 1863, the postmaster was John Devereaix (variant of D'evreux).
- 1884, population reaches 668.
- 1886, the Way or Post, office closed.
- 1898, Trepassey-born William Fewer, a boatswain on board the USS Maine is killed when the vessel explodes at anchor in Havana Harbour, igniting the Spanish–American War.
- 1914, the Newfoundland Railway Branch Line is completed, linking Trepassey with St. John’s.
- 1919, United States Navy Curtiss Flying Boats (the NC-1, NC-3 and NC-4) leave Trepassey harbour on May 16; NC-4 flies to Portugal via the Azores, thus completing the first successful (although not non-stop) transatlantic flight.
- 1928 (June 28), after staying in Trepassey for three weeks, Amelia Earhart as a passenger aboard the Friendship, becomes the first woman to fly across the Atlantic Ocean.
- 1969, the community elects its first town council.
- 1991, the local fish plant closes putting over 600 people out of work.

== Demographics ==
In the 2021 Census of Population conducted by Statistics Canada, Trepassey had a population of 405 living in 224 of its 299 total private dwellings, a change of −15.8% from its 2016 population of 481. With a land area of 54.21 km^{2} (20.93 sq mi), it had a population density of 7.5/km^{2} (19.3/sq mi) in 2021.

== Bedrock and Soils ==
Trepassey is underlain by Jurassic-era sedimentary rock of the Fermeuse Formation, with gray and black shale dominant plus some siltstone and sandstone.The soils are extremely acidic, stony gleyed podzols of the Biscay Bay series.

== See also ==
- List of cities and towns in Newfoundland and Labrador
