= Witless Bay =

- Town
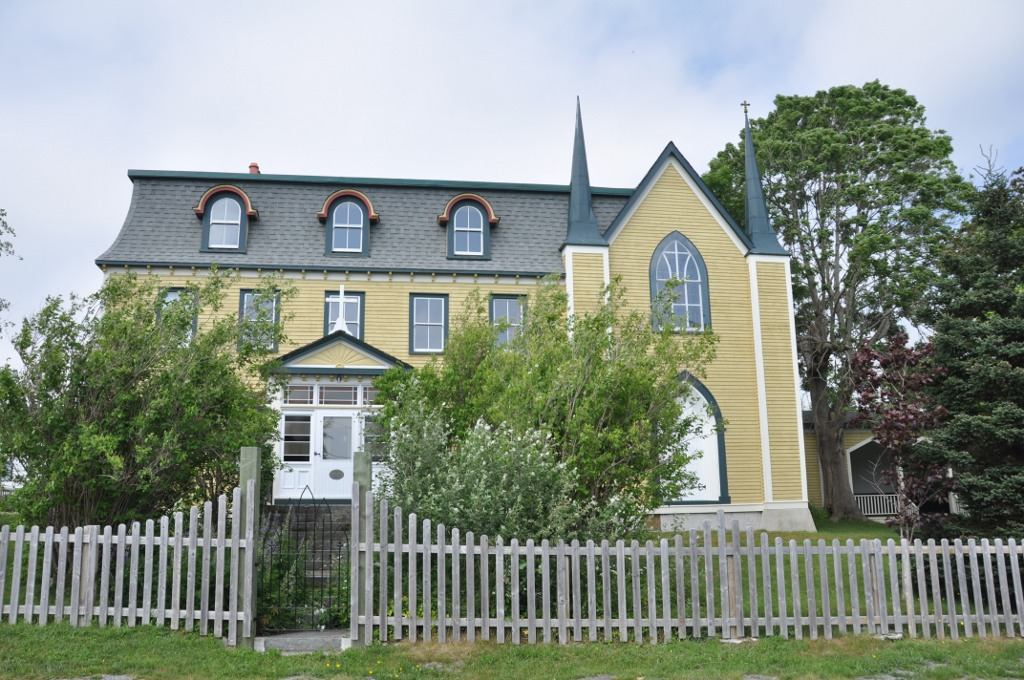

- Location of Witless Bay in Newfoundland
- Coordinates: 47°17′N 52°50′W
- Country: Canada
- Province: Newfoundland and Labrador

Government
  - Mayor: Trevor Croft

Area
  - Land: 17.49 km^{2} (6.75 sq mi)

Population (2021)
  - Total: 1,640
  - Density: 92.6/km^{2} (240/sq mi)
- Time zone: UTC-3:30 (Newfoundland Time)
  - Summer (DST): UTC-2:30 (Newfoundland Daylight)
- Area code: 709
- Highways: Route 10; Route 13
- Website: www.townofwitlessbay.com

Witless Bay is a town on the Avalon Peninsula in the Canadian province of Newfoundland and Labrador. Located on the Irish Loop, 35 km south of the provincial capital, St. John's, Witless Bay is a small, scenic, traditional Newfoundland outport community. The town had a population of 1640 in the Canada 2021 Census. It is connected to the Witless Bay Ecological Reserve.

Witless Bay is the setting for Howard Norman's novel, The Bird Artist.

== Etymology ==
One of the original European inhabitants of the area was Captain Whittle, who had brought his family from Dorset, England, to Newfoundland. The area was named after them: Whittle's Bay. When Captain Whittle died, his widow and her children returned to England. Whittle's Bay (which was from then on "Whittles-less") eventually became Witless Bay.

== History ==
1675, the population of Witless Bay is 34.

1700s, Irish fishing servants begin arriving in the area and quickly start to outnumber the English.

1755, as Roman Catholicism is still outlawed in Newfoundland, priests disguised as fishermen minister to the spiritual needs of the community.

1836, the first official census of Newfoundland puts the population at 542, of which 540 were Roman Catholic.

1845, Roman Catholic church opens.

1860, the Presentation Sisters open a convent and a school for girls.

1871, population reaches 928.

1960s, people are resettled from Gallows Cove at the southern headland of Witless Bay to the community of Witless Bay.

1986, Witless Bay is incorporated,.

1986, the first town manager of the Witless Bay is named, Joan Marie Yard (1943-1999)

2016, population reaches 1619, population grows by 38.7% from 2011, making it the fastest-growing town in the province.

== Demographics ==
In the 2021 census of population conducted by Statistics Canada, Witless Bay had a population of 1,640 living in 611 of its 656 total private dwellings, a change of 1.3% from its 2016 population of 1,619. With a land area of 17.61 km^{2} (6.80 sq mi), it had a population density of 93.1/km^{2} (241.2/sq mi) in 2021.

== Economy ==
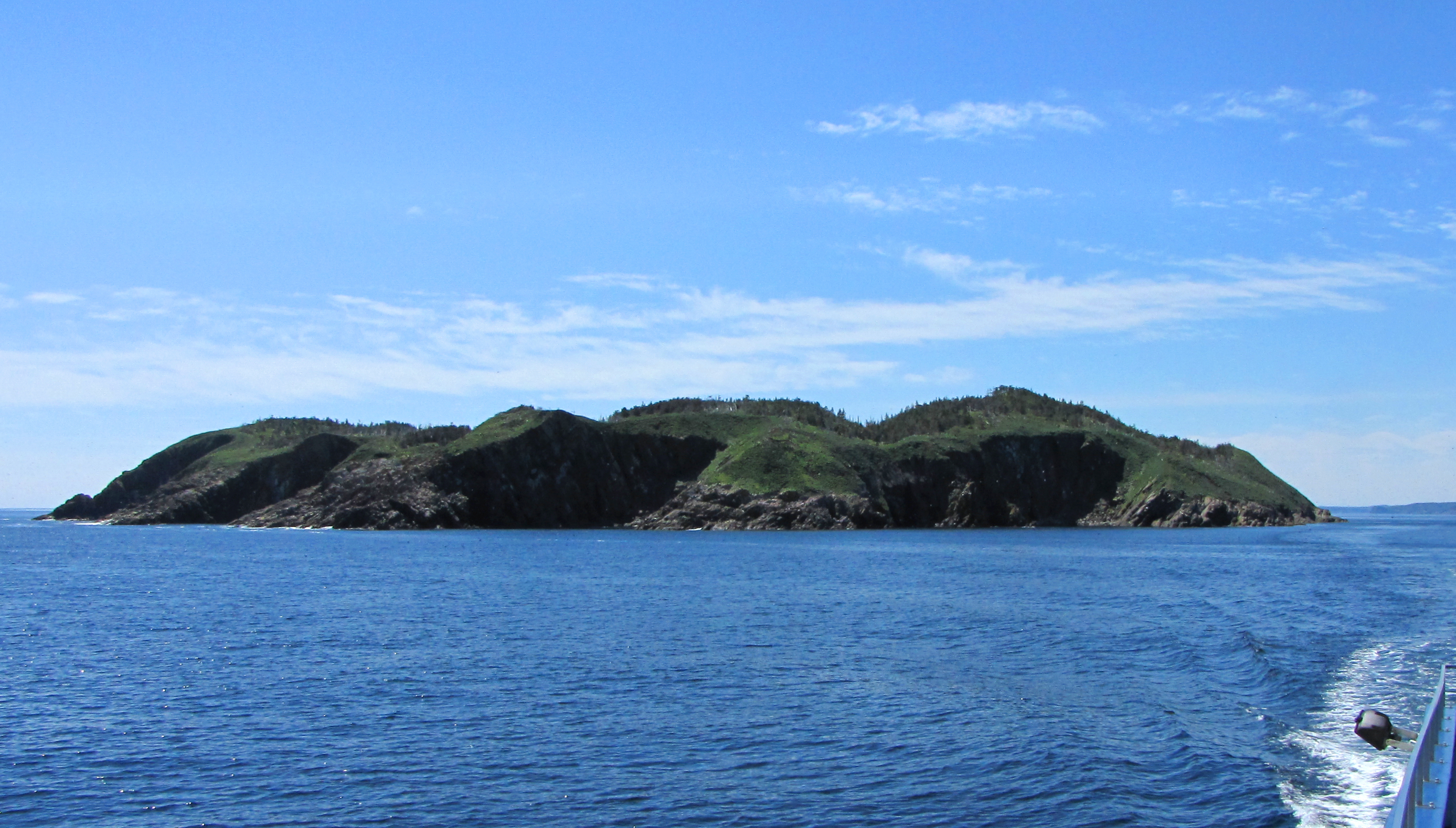
Gull Island, Witless Bay

Witless Bay is a fishing community, first established because of its closeness to the rich fishing grounds on the Grand Banks. Tourism is an important part of the community as well, since the community is home to the Witless Bay Ecological Reserve, which contains North America's largest Atlantic Puffin colony and the world's second-largest colony of Leach's Storm-petrels. The presence of these bird colonies has given birth to the Witless Bay Puffin and Petrel Patrol, a volunteer organization aiming to save stranded chick and return them safely to the ocean. Bed-and-breakfast establishments, coffee shops, a whale and puffin tour operator, several craftspeople, and the Witless Bay and Area Puffin and Petrel Patrol attract visitors from all over the world.

St. Bernard's Elementary School, part of the Eastern School District, is located in Witless Bay. The town is also home to one of the three surviving crab processing plants of the Irish Loop.

== Government ==
The Witless Bay Town Council is made up of a mayor, deputy mayor, and five councillors. The mayor of the town is Trevor Croft. The deputy mayor is Lorna Yard. Councillors are Ralph Carey, Gerard Dunne, Jacob Hayden, and Alan Richards.

Joan Marie Yard was the first town manager of the town of Witless Bay (from incorporation in 1986 until her death at the age of 55 in 1999). She was very active in bringing many new initiatives to the town including the Girl Guides of Canada, the Witless Bay Volunteer Fire Department, and was instrumental in the creation of the Witless Bay Santa Claus Parade. As well she was the organist for the local church and an advocate of preserving natural assets.

The current chief administrative officer is Jennifer Aspell.

== See also ==
- List of cities and towns in Newfoundland and Labrador
