= Pointe du Van =

Promontory in Brittany, France

Aerial view of Pointe du Van

The Pointe du Van (Breton: Beg ar Vann, French: Pointe du Van, 48°03′48″N 4°42′55″W) is a promontory that extends into the Atlantic from western Brittany, in France.

The local Breton name is Beg ar Vann. It is located in the commune of Plogoff, Finistère.
