= Port Kirwan =

Port Kirwan Admiral's Cove
- Fishing Town
- Location of Port Kirwan in Newfoundland
- Coordinates: 46°58′09″N 52°54′40″W
- Country: Canada
- Province: Newfoundland and Labrador
- Settled: mid 18th century
- Incorporated: 1960

Government
  - Mayor: Scotty Diddle Ward

Population (2021)
  - Total: 49
- Time zone: UTC-3:30 (Newfoundland Time)
  - Summer (DST): UTC-2:30 (Newfoundland Daylight)
- Area code: 709
- Highways: Route 10

Port Kirwan is a small incorporated fishing community located on the southern shore of the Avalon Peninsula, Newfoundland, Canada.

== Demographics ==
In the 2021 Census of Population conducted by Statistics Canada, Port Kirwan had a population of 49 living in 30 of its 53 total private dwellings, a change of −5.8% from its 2016 population of 52. With a land area of 8.84 km^{2} (3.41 sq mi), it had a population density of 5.5/km^{2} (14.4/sq mi) in 2021.

== See also ==
- Avalon Peninsula
- List of cities and towns in Newfoundland and Labrador
- List of people of Newfoundland and Labrador
