= Mobile, Newfoundland and Labrador =

Human settlement in Canada

Coordinates: 47°15′N 52°51′W

Mobile is a local service district and designated place in the Canadian province of Newfoundland and Labrador on the Avalon Peninsula.

== Geography ==
Mobile is in Newfoundland within Subdivision U of Division No. 1. It has a beach and is forested.

== Demographics ==
As a designated place in the 2016 Census of Population conducted by Statistics Canada, Mobile recorded a population of 435 living in 183 of its 403 total private dwellings, a change of 116.4% from its 2011 population of 201. With a land area of 6.5 km^{2} (2.5 sq mi), it had a population density of 66.9/km^{2} (173.3/sq mi) in 2016.

== Government ==
Mobile is a local service district (LSD) that is governed by a committee responsible for the provision of certain services to the community. The chair of the LSD committee is Julie White.

== See also ==
- List of communities in Newfoundland and Labrador
- List of designated places in Newfoundland and Labrador
- List of local service districts in Newfoundland and Labrador
