= Fermeuse =

- Town
- Location of Fermeuse in Newfoundland
- Coordinates: 46°58′42″N 52°57′18″W
- Country: Canada
- Province: Newfoundland and Labrador

Population (2021)
  - Total: 266
- Time zone: UTC-3:30 (Newfoundland Time)
  - Summer (DST): UTC-2:30 (Newfoundland Daylight)
- Area code: 709
- Highways: Route 10

Fermeuse is a town in the Canadian province of Newfoundland and Labrador. The town had a population of 266 in the Canada 2021 Census.

The town is located on the eastern portion of the Avalon Peninsula approximately 80 kilometres south of St. John's via paved two-lane highway. Like other communities in the area, Fermeuse was used as a summer fishing station in the 1500s by the Portuguese and is referred to on early Portuguese maps as R. Fermoso and Rio Fremoze. The fishery continues to be the economic engine for the town, but in recent history, projects such as a Marine Center and a wind power project have created new opportunities for residents.

The harbour has excellent proximity to the offshore oil and gas operations off the coast of Newfoundland and Labrador. Fermeuse Harbour is long (approximately 5 km) and well protected. It provides a naturally sheltered port with hilly terrain to the north and south. The harbour possesses key characteristics, including:

- Safe harbour in most all weather conditions
- Ice free
- Sufficient deep water, berthing spaces and supportive laydown areas.

Fermeuse, also has many scenic hiking trails with views of the Atlantic Ocean. The Bear Cove Point path is an 11.1 km point-to-point trail generally considered a moderately challenging route. It takes an average of 3 h 49 min to complete and offers the opportunity for bird watching, hiking, and running. The community also has many cottages catering to the numerous hikers of the East Coast Trail and other hiking trails in the area.

Fermeuse is the hometown of former NHL player Ryane Clowe who played with the New Jersey Devils, New York Rangers and San Jose Sharks.

== Demographics ==
In the 2021 Census of Population conducted by Statistics Canada, Fermeuse had a population of 266 living in 126 of its 171 total private dwellings, a change of −18.2% from its 2016 population of 325. With a land area of 38.33 km^{2} (14.80 sq mi), it had a population density of 6.9/km^{2} (18.0/sq mi) in 2021.

== See also ==
- List of cities and towns in Newfoundland and Labrador
