= Chance Cove Provincial Park =

Provincial park in Newfoundland and Labrador, Canada

Coordinates: 46°46′34″N 53°02′10″W

- IUCN category II (national park)
- Location: Avalon Peninsula, Newfoundland and Labrador, Canada
- Nearest town: Renews-Cappahayden
- Area: 20.68 km^{2} (7.98 sq mi)
- Governing body: Parks Division of Newfoundland and Labrador
- Website: https://www.parksnl.ca/parks/chance-cove-provincial-park/

Chance Cove Provincial Park is a provincial park located approximately 20 km south of Renews-Cappahayden, Newfoundland and Labrador. Chance Cove was once the site of a small settlement of approximately 50 people in the mid-19th century, and is home to many shipwrecks of the Atlantic Ocean. Until the late 1980s, pieces of the forgotten homes were still visible.

== See also ==
- List of protected areas of Newfoundland and Labrador
- List of Canadian protected areas
