= Portugal Cove South =

- Town
- Interactive map of Portugal Cove South
- Coordinates: 46°42′38″N 53°15′28″W
- Country: Canada
- Province: Newfoundland and Labrador

Area
  - Total: 1.14 km^{2} (0.44 sq mi)

Population (2021)
  - Total: 86
  - Density: 131.5/km^{2} (341/sq mi)
- Time zone: UTC-3:30 (Newfoundland Time)
  - Summer (DST): UTC-2:30 (Newfoundland Daylight)
- Area code: 709
- Highways: Route 10

Portugal Cove South is a small fishing town on the southern shore of the Avalon Peninsula of Newfoundland in the province of Newfoundland and Labrador, Canada. Portugal Cove South had a population of 225 in the Canada 2006 Census, down to 86 in Canada 2021 Census.

== Demographics ==
In the 2021 Census of Population conducted by Statistics Canada, Portugal Cove South had a population of 86 living in 47 of its 85 total private dwellings, a change of −42.7% from its 2016 population of 150. With a land area of 1.08 km^{2} (0.42 sq mi), it had a population density of 79.6/km^{2} (206.2/sq mi) in 2021.

== See also ==
- List of cities and towns in Newfoundland and Labrador
