= Cape Broyle =

- Town
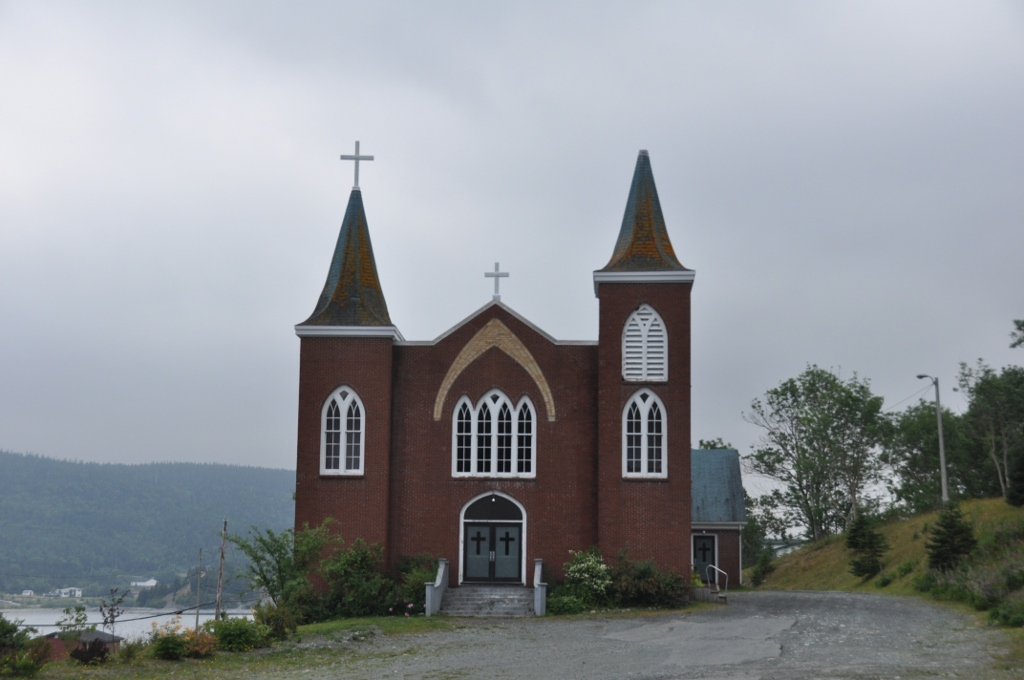

- Location of Cape Broyle in Newfoundland
- Coordinates: 47°05′00″N 52°57′00″W
- Country: Canada
- Province: Newfoundland and Labrador

Government
  - Mayor: Beverley O'Brien

Area
  - Land: 10.05 km^{2} (3.88 sq mi)

Population (2021)
  - Total: 499
- Time zone: UTC-3:30 (Newfoundland Time)
  - Summer (DST): UTC-2:30 (Newfoundland Daylight)
- Area code: 709
- Highways: Route 10

The Town of Cape Broyle (population: 499) is an incorporated community located on the Avalon Peninsula in Newfoundland and Labrador, Canada. During King William's War, the village was destroyed in the Avalon Peninsula Campaign.

== Demographics ==
In the 2021 Census of Population conducted by Statistics Canada, Cape Broyle had a population of 499 living in 228 of its 314 total private dwellings, a change of 2% from its 2016 population of 489. With a land area of 10.09 km^{2} (3.90 sq mi), it had a population density of 49.5/km^{2} (128.1/sq mi) in 2021.
