= Division No. 1, Subdivision U, Newfoundland and Labrador =

Subdivision 1U
- Unorganized territory
- Division No. 1, Subdivision U
- Location within Newfoundland
- Country: Canada
- Province: Newfoundland and Labrador
- Census division: Division 1

Government
  - MHA: Loyola O'Driscoll (PCPNL, Ferryland)
  - MP: Paul Connors (LIB, Avalon)

Area
  - Land: 754.37 km^{2} (291.26 sq mi)

Population (2016)
  - Total: 1,625
  - Density: 2.2/km^{2} (5.7/sq mi)
- Time zone: UTC-3:30 (Newfoundland Time)
  - Summer (DST): UTC-2:30 (Newfoundland Daylight)

Division No. 1, Subdivision U is an unorganized subdivision on the Avalon Peninsula in Newfoundland and Labrador, Canada, in Division 1. It contains the unincorporated communities of Admiral's Cove, Bauline East, Bauline South, Burnt Cove, Devils Kitchen, Flat Rock, St. Michaels and Seal Cove.

== Admiral's Cove ==
47°05′49″N 52°54′33″W Admiral's Cove is a small unincorporated fishing community located in Cape Broyle Harbour on the southern shore of the Avalon Peninsula in the province of Newfoundland and Labrador, Canada.

== Burnt Cove ==
47°12′N 52°51′W Burnt Cove is a community in the Canadian province of Newfoundland and Labrador, located on the Avalon Peninsula south of St. John's and north of Ferryland.

Previously known as Burn Cove, Byrne's Cove, Bryne Cove, and Basin Cove, the community's population in 1996 was 196.

== St. Michaels ==
47.193°N 52.846°W St. Michaels is a settlement in Newfoundland and Labrador.
