= Renews-Cappahayden =

Renews–Cappahayden Broad Cove, Vaughan's Cove
- Town
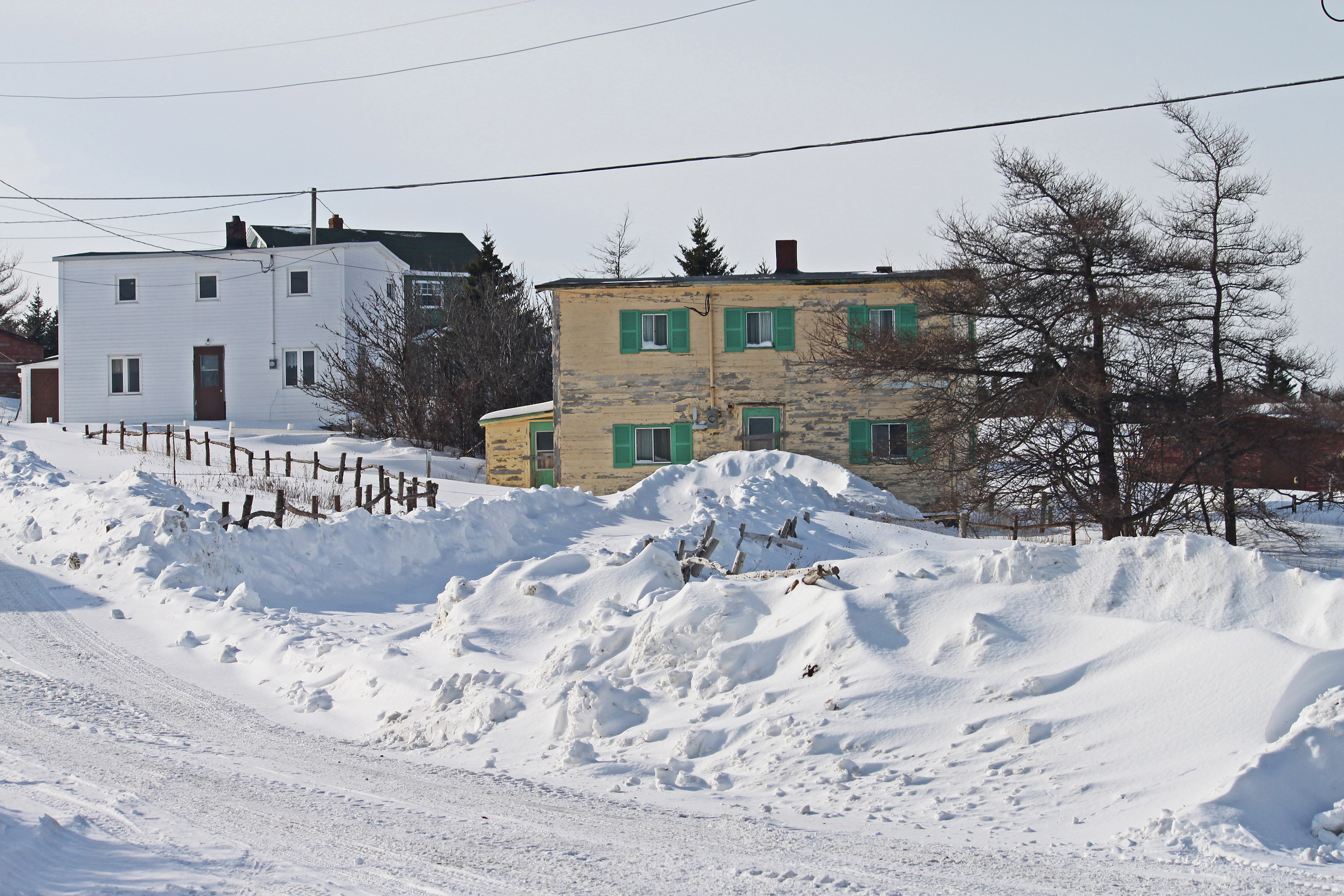

- Location of Renews–Cappahayden in Newfoundland
- Coordinates: 46°51′36″N 52°56′37″W
- Country: Canada
- Province: Newfoundland and Labrador
- Settled: 1617
- Incorporated: Mid-1960s

Population (2021)
  - Total: 280
- Time zone: UTC−03:30 (Newfoundland Time)
  - Summer (DST): UTC−02:30 (Newfoundland Daylight)
- Area code: 709
- Highways: Route 10

Renews–Cappahayden is a small fishing town on the southern shore of Newfoundland, 83 kilometres (52 mi) south of St. John's.

The town was incorporated in the mid-1960s by amalgamating the formerly independent villages of Renews and Cappahayden.

Renews–Cappahayden had a population of 280 in the 2021 Canadian census.

== Renews ==
The village was first settled by migratory fishermen and then by colonists. The colony was first proposed in 1610 by the London and Bristol Company, which had previously started an English colony at Cuper's Cove, but settlement was delayed by the presence of the pirate Peter Easton. In 1615, the territory was sold to William Vaughan who initially sent settlers to Aquaforte. Around 1617, Governor Richard Whitbourne moved six remaining colonists to Renews, but they had left by 1619. Vaughan soon sold land that crossed the Avalon Peninsula, including Renews harbour to Henry Cary, 1st Viscount Falkland who named the territory South Falkland.

According to a popular local legend (unsubstantiated), the Mayflower landed at Renews in 1620, where it picked up water and supplies before sailing on to Plymouth Rock.

A battery was established there in 1755 and was manned consistently from thence until 1815, during the Napoleonic Wars.

In the summer of 1839, Methodist Missionary William Marshall estimated the population of Renews to contain roughly 900 Catholics and 50 "entirely destitute" Protestants.

Loyola Hearn, Canada's former Minister of Fisheries and Oceans, is from Renews.

== Cappahayden ==
Cappahayden, once called Broad Cove, can date inhabitants located there in the late 18th century. Its location was reported by William Vaughan as early as 1626 when it was noted on a map as Vaughan's Cove. The name Cappahayden was given by Father John Walsh after his birthplace, Cappahayden, Kilkenny. The name Cappahayden was approved by the Newfoundland Nomenclature Board in 1913.

Cappahayden is the southern terminus of the East Coast Trail.

Just south of Cappahayden is the site of the tragic sinking of the SS Florizel at Horn Head Point (46°50′56″N 52°56′20″W), near Chance Cove Park. A monument to the sinking is located in Cappahayden, facing towards the wreck location.

== Climate ==
Climate data for Cappahayden, 1981–2010 normals
Month	Jan	Feb	Mar	Apr	May	Jun	Jul	Aug	Sep	Oct	Nov	Dec	Year
Record high °C (°F)	12.0 (53.6)	14.0 (57.2)	13.0 (55.4)	20.0 (68.0)	26.0 (78.8)	27.0 (80.6)	30.0 (86.0)	30.0 (86.0)	27.0 (80.6)	23.0 (73.4)	17.0 (62.6)	12.0 (53.6)	30.0 (86.0)
Mean daily maximum °C (°F)	−0.6 (30.9)	−0.5 (31.1)	1.5 (34.7)	5.0 (41.0)	10.1 (50.2)	14.6 (58.3)	19.5 (67.1)	19.9 (67.8)	16.2 (61.2)	11.1 (52.0)	6.4 (43.5)	1.9 (35.4)	8.8 (47.8)
Daily mean °C (°F)	−4.1 (24.6)	−4.2 (24.4)	−1.8 (28.8)	1.9 (35.4)	6.0 (42.8)	9.8 (49.6)	14.3 (57.7)	15.2 (59.4)	12.0 (53.6)	7.3 (45.1)	3.1 (37.6)	−1.2 (29.8)	4.9 (40.7)
Mean daily minimum °C (°F)	−7.6 (18.3)	−7.9 (17.8)	−5.2 (22.6)	−1.2 (29.8)	1.8 (35.2)	5.0 (41.0)	9.1 (48.4)	10.5 (50.9)	7.9 (46.2)	3.4 (38.1)	−0.3 (31.5)	−4.2 (24.4)	0.9 (33.7)
Record low °C (°F)	−22.0 (−7.6)	−26.0 (−14.8)	−23.5 (−10.3)	−14.5 (5.9)	−8.0 (17.6)	−1.5 (29.3)	2.0 (35.6)	1.5 (34.7)	−1.0 (30.2)	−7.0 (19.4)	−14.0 (6.8)	−19.0 (−2.2)	−26.0 (−14.8)
Average precipitation mm (inches)	152.6 (6.01)	126.6 (4.98)	140.2 (5.52)	124.1 (4.89)	111.1 (4.37)	112.3 (4.42)	115.0 (4.53)	112.7 (4.44)	134.7 (5.30)	144.2 (5.68)	158.5 (6.24)	151.4 (5.96)	1,583.4 (62.34)
Average rainfall mm (inches)	101.3 (3.99)	83.5 (3.29)	114.0 (4.49)	113.7 (4.48)	109.6 (4.31)	112.3 (4.42)	115.0 (4.53)	112.7 (4.44)	134.7 (5.30)	144.2 (5.68)	152.9 (6.02)	117.6 (4.63)	1,411.5 (55.58)
Average snowfall cm (inches)	51.3 (20.2)	43.1 (17.0)	26.1 (10.3)	10.4 (4.1)	1.5 (0.6)	0 (0)	0 (0)	0 (0)	0 (0)	0 (0)	5.6 (2.2)	33.8 (13.3)	171.8 (67.7)
Average precipitation days (≥ 0.2 mm)	14.7	13.0	12.8	12.7	14.5	14.2	12.6	13.7	15.0	15.6	15.8	15.2	169.8
Average rainy days (≥ 0.2 mm)	8.6	8.3	9.7	11.7	14.4	14.2	12.6	13.7	15.0	15.6	15.1	12.2	151.1
Average snowy days (≥ 0.2 cm)	7.8	6.1	4.5	1.4	0.33	0	0	0	0	0	1.1	4.6	25.83
Source: Environment Canada

== Demographics ==
In the 2021 census conducted by Statistics Canada, Renews-Cappahayden had a population of 280 living in 143 of its 259 total private dwellings, a change of −7% from its 2016 population of 301. With a land area of 125.93 km^{2} (48.62 sq mi), it had a population density of 2.2/km^{2} (5.8/sq mi) in 2021.

== See also ==
- List of municipalities in Newfoundland and Labrador
