= Bay Bulls, Newfoundland and Labrador =

Bay Bulls
- Town
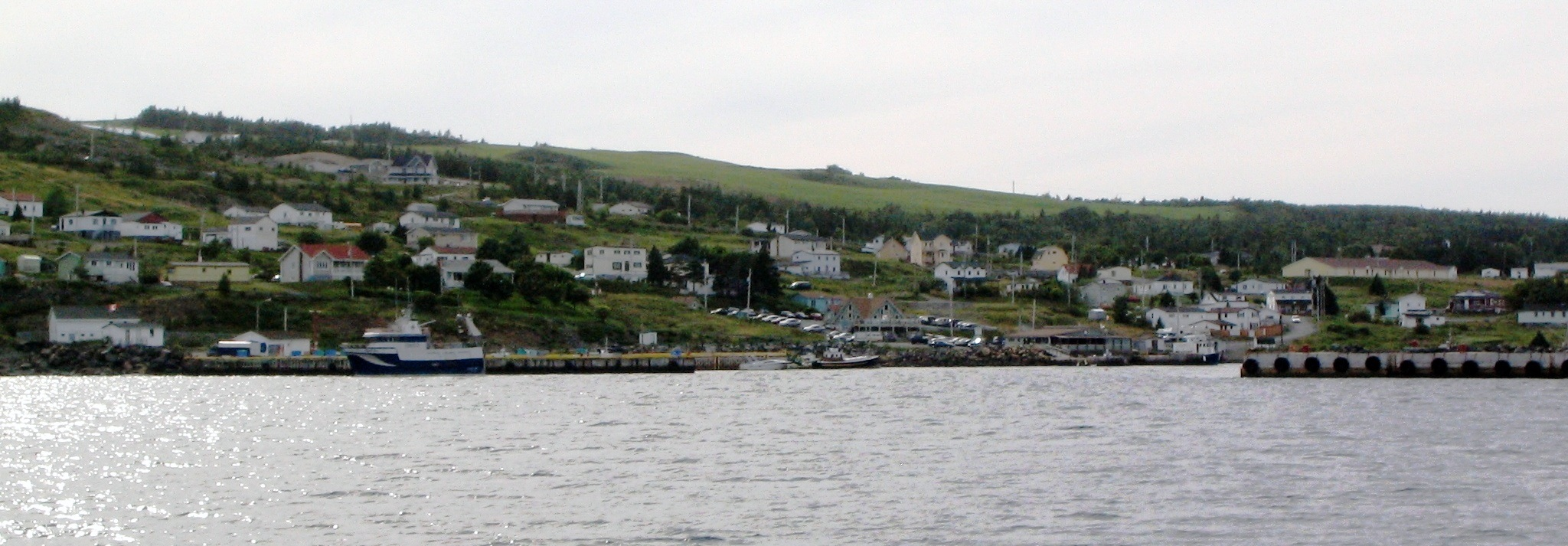
- Bay Bulls in August, 2006

- Location of Bay Bulls in Newfoundland
- Coordinates: 47°18′57″N 52°48′37″W
- Country: Canada
- Province: Newfoundland and Labrador
- settled: 1635-1638

Government
  - Mayor: Neil O'Brien

Area
  - Land: 30.74 km^{2} (11.87 sq mi)

Population (2021)
  - Total: 1,566
  - Density: 48.8/km^{2} (126/sq mi)
- Time zone: UTC-3:30 (Newfoundland Time)
  - Summer (DST): UTC-2:30 (Newfoundland Daylight)
- Area code: 709
- Highways: Route 10
- Website: townofbaybulls.com
- Bay Bulls Lighthouse
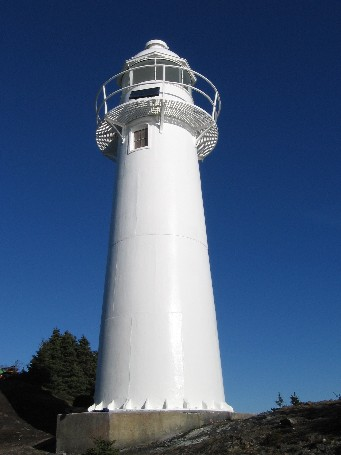
- Constructed: 1908
- Foundation: concrete base
- Construction: cast iron tower
- Height: 11 m (36 ft)
- Shape: cylindrical tower with balcony and lantern
- Markings: white tower and lantern
- Power source: solar power
- Operator: Canadian Coast Guard
- Heritage: recognized federal heritage building of Canada
- Focal height: 62 m (203 ft)
- Lens: fourth ordered Fresnel lens
- Range: 7 nmi (13 km; 8.1 mi)
- Characteristic: Fl W 6s

Bay Bulls (2021 population: 1,566) is a small fishing town in the province of Newfoundland and Labrador, Canada.

== Geography ==
Located in a sheltered bay, it has been home to many fishermen and a strategic location in early times as it is located just a few miles from the capital, St. John's.

== History ==
Bay Bulls first appears on a 1592 map drawn by Thomas Hood.

Fortification of the harbour came in 1638 by Governor David Kirke. In 1665, Bay Bulls was raided by Dutch sailors under Admiral De Ruyter. During King William's War, the village was attacked twice. In 1694 the colony had exported 100,000 quintals of fish and 1,000 tons of train oil and the commander was Captain Christopher Hogge. In 1696, Monbeton de St. Ovide de Brouillan, the governor of Placentia, attacked Bay Bulls from the sea, resulting in the scuttling of the English warship HMS Sapphire. Then in 1697 Pierre Le Moyne d'Iberville marched overland from Placentia and attacked Bay Bulls in the Avalon Peninsula Campaign. In 1702, Commodore John Leake of the Royal Navy entered Bay Bulls with several Men of War, and received information about the whereabouts of French ships and unprotected settlements around the Avalon Peninsula, which he then attacked. On June 24, 1762, the French led by Admiral d'Arsac de Ternay, landed seven hundred men who occupied Bay Bulls and marched to St. John's. Bay Bulls suffered its last invasion on September 29, 1796, when Admiral Richery attempted to storm St. John's but finding it well defended; he attacked and burned Bay Bulls instead.

In 1890 the Roman Catholic church St. Peter and St. Paul was rebuilt. The gate was initially marked by cannons left over from the battles with the French, then statues of the Saints were added on top, which gave the famous "Canonized Saints of Bay Bulls."

== Demographics ==
In the 2021 Census of Population conducted by Statistics Canada, Bay Bulls had a population of 1,566 living in 597 of its 631 total private dwellings, a change of 4.4% from its 2016 population of 1,500. With a land area of 30.6 km^{2} (11.8 sq mi), it had a population density of 51.2/km^{2} (132.5/sq mi) in 2021.

== Economy ==
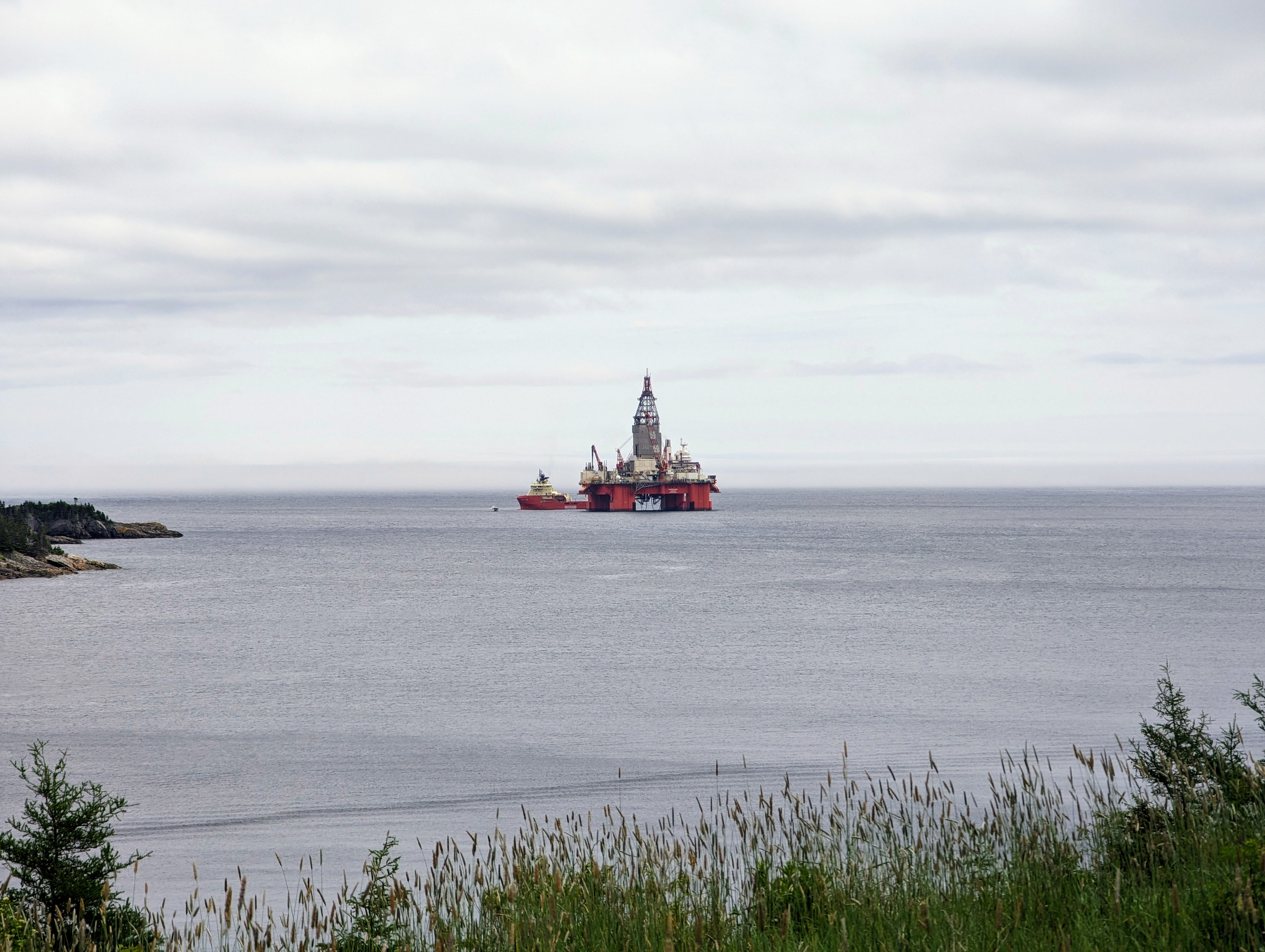
Hercules oil platform in Bay Bulls in 2023

Bay Bulls is a fishing community and was established because it is close to the rich fishing grounds on the Grand Banks. Due to its proximity to St. John's, the town is becoming more of a bedroom community for people employed there. Bay Bulls has been at the forefront of many strategies such as fish farming and lately servicing the Oil and Gas industry. The Penney Group of Companies has built a repair facility that services the many oil rigs that drill for oil on the Grand Banks. Tourism has become an important part of the community as well. Four whale and bird watching establishments, as well as several bed-and-breakfast places, attract visitors from all over the world.

== Image gallery ==
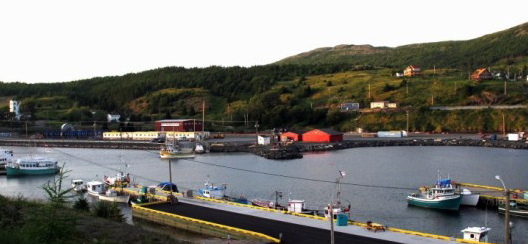
Bay Bulls Harbour

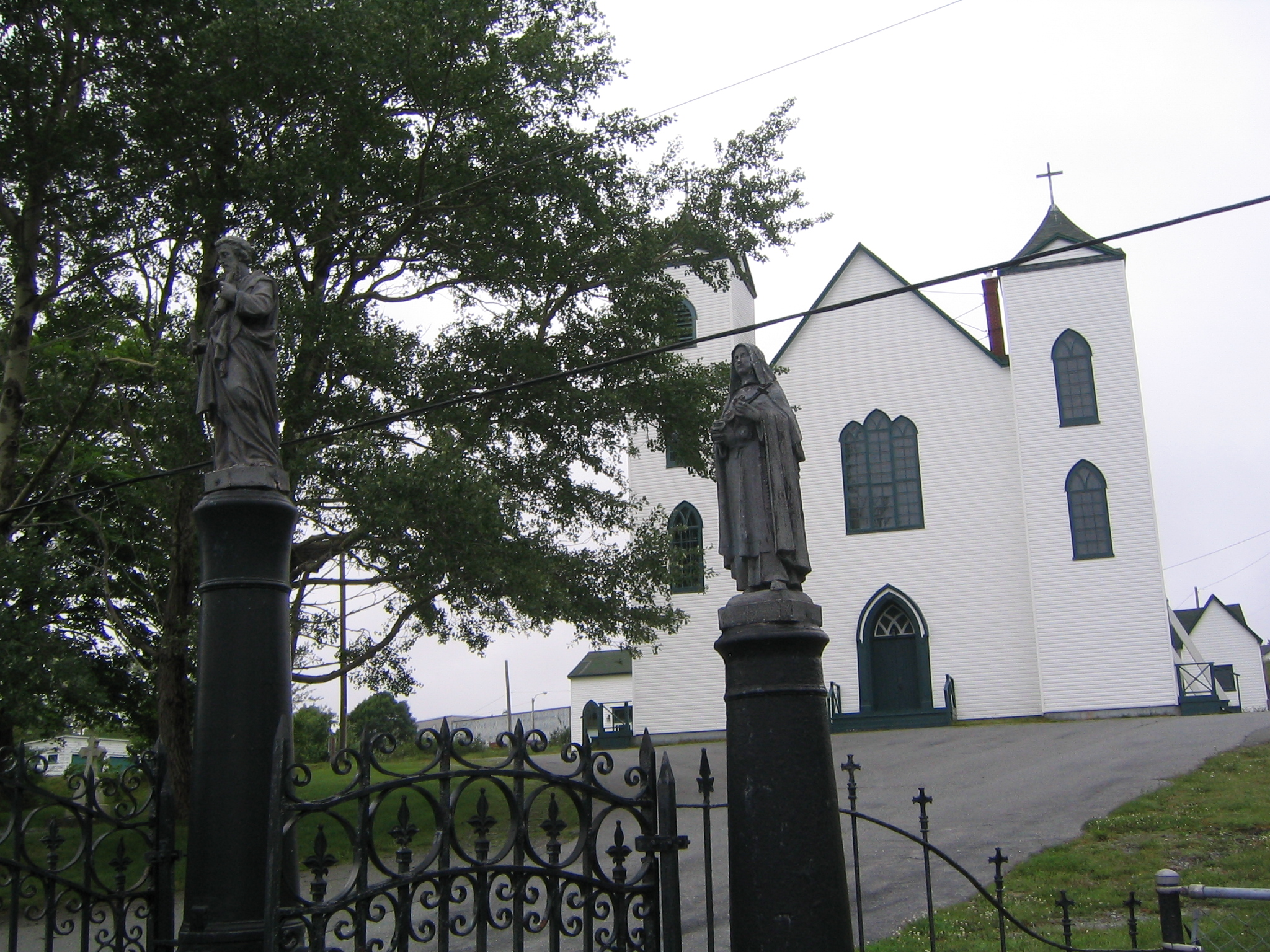
St. Peter and St. Paul Church, showing the "canonized saints"

== See also ==
- List of lighthouses in Canada
- List of cities and towns in Newfoundland and Labrador
