= Newfoundland and Labrador Route 61 =

Highway in Newfoundland and Labrador, Canada

Route 61
- Foxtrap Access Road

Route information
- Maintained by Newfoundland and Labrador Department of Transportation and Infrastructure
- Length: 8.2 km (5.1 mi)

Major junctions
- South end: Route 1 (TCH) near Foxtrap
- Route 2 in Foxtrap
- North end: Route 60 at Foxtrap

Location
- Country: Canada
- Province: Newfoundland and Labrador

Highway system
- Highways in Newfoundland and Labrador
← Route 60	→ Route 62

Route 61, also known as Foxtrap Access Road, is a short access road which connects the Trans-Canada Highway with Foxtrap, part of the town of Conception Bay South.

== Route description ==
Route 61 begins at an interchange with Route 1 (Trans-Canada Highway, Exit 39) south of town. It heads northwest through rural wooded areas to enter the town limits, and begins passing through neighbourhoods to have an interchange with Route 2 (Peacekeepers Way). The highway now passes by several parks and businesses before coming to an end near the coastline at an intersection with Route 60 (Conception Bay Highway).

== Major intersections ==
Location	km	mi	Destinations	Notes
	0.0	0.0	Route 1 (TCH) – St. John's, Clarenville	Exit 39 on Route 1; southern terminus
Foxtrap	6.3– 6.4	3.9– 4.0	Route 2 (Peacekeepers Way) – Holyrood, St. John's	Interchange
Foxtrap	8.2	5.1	Route 60 (Conception Bay Highway) – Paradise, Holyrood	Northern terminus
1.000 mi = 1.609 km; 1.000 km = 0.621 mi

== See also ==
- List of highways numbered 61
