= Newfoundland and Labrador Route 62 =

Highway in Newfoundland and Labrador, Canada

Route 62
- Liam Hickey Drive

Route information
- Maintained by Newfoundland and Labrador Department of Transportation and Infrastructure
- Length: 5.0 km (3.1 mi)

Major junctions
- South end: Route 1 (TCH) near Butter Pot Provincial Park
- North end: Route 60 at Holyrood

Location
- Country: Canada
- Province: Newfoundland and Labrador

Highway system
- Highways in Newfoundland and Labrador
← Route 61	→ Route 63

Route 62, also known as Liam Hickey Drive, is an access road which connects the Trans-Canada Highway at an interchange with the town of Holyrood. It runs for about five kilometres (3.1 mi) and is one of two provincial routes designated as an access to Holyrood (the other being Route 90).

Before 2018, it was called Holyrood Access Road.

== Route description ==
Route 62 begins at an interchange with Route 1 (Trans Canada Highway, Exit 36) near Butter Pot Provincial Park. It heads north through rural wooded areas to enter the town limits and pass by IBEW College. The highway continues north to pass by a golf course and a few other businesses before entering downtown, where Route 62 comes to an end at an intersection with Route 60 (Conception Bay Highway).

== Major intersections ==
Location	km	mi	Destinations	Notes
	0.0– 0.3	0.0– 0.19	Route 1 (TCH) – St. John's, Clarenville	Exit 36 on Route 1; southern terminus
Holyrood	5.0	3.1	Route 60 (Conception Bay Highway) – Harbour Main-Chapel's Cove-Lakeview, Conception Bay South	Northern terminus
1.000 mi = 1.609 km; 1.000 km = 0.621 mi

== See also ==
- List of highways numbered 62
