= Newfoundland and Labrador Route 60 =

Highway in Newfoundland and Labrador, Canada

Route 60
- Topsail Road; Conception Bay Highway

Route information
- Maintained by Newfoundland and Labrador Department of Transportation and Infrastructure
- Length: 74.7 km (46.4 mi)

Major junctions
- East end: Water Street in St. John's
- The Parkway in St. John's; Route 3A (Team Gushue Highway) on the St. John's-Mount Pearl city line; Kenmount Road in Mount Pearl; Route 1 (TCH) in Paradise; Route 50 in Paradise; Route 61 in Conception Bay South; Route 2 in Conception Bay South; Route 62 in Holyrood; Route 90 in Holyrood; Route 63 in Avondale
- West end: Route 70 / Route 71 on the Cupids - South River town line

Location
- Country: Canada
- Province: Newfoundland and Labrador

Highway system
- Highways in Newfoundland and Labrador
| ← Route 50 | → Route 61 |

Route 60, also known as Topsail Road in Mount Pearl and St. Johns, and as Conception Bay Highway for the rest of its length, is a 74.7-kilometre-long (46.4 mi) east–west highway on the Avalon Peninsula of Newfoundland. It runs between the town of Cupids and the city of St. John's.

== Route description ==
Route 60 begins as Topsail Road at the west end of Water Street in downtown St. John's, where the road divides into Topsail Road and Waterford Bridge Road. It continues on through the west end of St. John's, then through the northern part of the city of Mount Pearl. After the overpass of Kenmount Road, the road passes through the towns of Paradise, Topsail, and Chamberlains.

After reaching the town of Manuels, Route 60 becomes the Conception Bay Highway, continuing through Conception Bay South, Holyrood, Marysvale, Brigus and ending at the intersection of Route 70 in the town of Cupids.

Within Mount Pearl and St. John's, Topsail Road is a major arterial road and commercial area. Two shopping malls, Mount Pearl Square and the Village Shopping Centre, are located on the road, as well as a number of strip malls, fast-food restaurants, other businesses, and residential properties.

Once out of the city, Route 60 also runs along the side of Conception Bay through many small rural communities. Route 60 was the main route for many people who live outside St. Johns area to travel into the city before Route 1 (TCH) was constructed.

East of its intersection with Cornwall Avenue, Topsail Road narrows to two lanes. The section from Cornwall Avenue to Water Street is often referred to as Old Topsail Road, although this is not its official name.

A large portion of the annual Tely 10 road race traces Route 60 eastbound through Paradise, Mount Pearl, and St. John's.

== Communities along Route 60 ==
- Cupids
- Cupids Crossing
- Brigus
- Georgetown
- Marysvale
- Colliers
- Conception Harbour
- Ballyhack
- Middle Arm
- Avondale
- Harbour Main-Chapel's Cove-Lakeview
- Holyrood
- Conception Bay South
- Paradise
- Mount Pearl
- St. John's

== Major intersections ==
| Location | km | mi | Destinations | Notes |
|---|---|---|---|---|
| South River - Cupids town line | 0.0 | 0.0 | Route 70 (Roaches Line/Conception Bay Highway/Baccalieu Trail) to Route 1 (TCH) – Bay Roberts, Carbonear; Route 71 south (Hodgewater Line) to Route 75 – Makinsons | Western terminus; northern terminus of Route 71; Conception Bay Highway continues north along Route 70 |
| Avondale | 19.5 | 12.1 | Route 63 south (Avondale Access Road) to Route 1 (TCH) – Eastbound International Raceway | Northern terminus of Route 63 |
| Holyrood | 30.5 | 19.0 | Route 90 south (Salmonier Line/Irish Loop Drive) – Mount Carmel-Mitchells Brook-St. Catherines | Northern terminus of Route 90 |
| Holyrood | 31.8 | 19.8 | Route 62 south (Holyrood Access Road) to Route 1 (TCH) – IBEW College | Northern terminus of Route 62 |
| Conception Bay South | 40.9 | 25.4 | Route 2 east (Peacekeepers Way) – St. John's | Western terminus of Route 2 |
| Conception Bay South | 49.4 | 30.7 | Route 61 south (Foxtrap Access Road) to Route 1 (TCH) / Route 2 | Northern terminus of Route 61 |
| Conception Bay South | 54.1 | 33.6 | Manuels Access Road - To Route 2 east (Peacekeepers Way) – St. John's | Route 60 becomes Topsail Road |
| Paradise | 60.1 | 37.3 | Route 50 east (St. Thomas Line) – Portugal Cove-St. Philips, Bell Island Ferry | Western terminus of Route 50 |
| Paradise | 64.2– 64.4 | 39.9– 40.0 | Route 1 (TCH) (Outer Ring Road) – Clarenville, St. John's | Exit 43 on Route 1 |
| Mount Pearl | 65.0– 65.3 | 40.4– 40.6 | Kenmount Road - Donovans, St. John's | Interchange |
| Mount Pearl-St. John's city line | 69.6 | 43.2 | Route 3A (Team Gushue Highway) | |
| St. John's | 72.3 | 44.9 | The Parkway (Columbus Drive) | |
| St. John's | 74.7 | 46.4 | Water Street To Route 11 south (Blackhead Road) – Downtown Waterford Bridge Road | Eastern terminus; Y-Intersection; road continues east as Water Street |
1.000 mi = 1.609 km; 1.000 km = 0.621 mi: Route transition
