= Newfoundland and Labrador Route 2 =

Highway in Newfoundland and Labrador, Canada

Route 2
- Peacekeeper's Way; Pitts Memorial Drive
- Route 2 highlighted in red

Route information
- Maintained by Newfoundland and Labrador Department of Transportation and Infrastructure
- Length: 34.2 km (21.3 mi)

Major junctions
- West end: Route 60 in Conception Bay South
- Route 61 in Conception Bay South; Route 1 (TCH) near Mount Pearl; Route 3 on the Mount Pearl-St. John's city line; Route 10 / The Parkway in St. John's
- East end: Hamilton Avenue / New Gower Street in St. John's

Location
- Country: Canada
- Province: Newfoundland and Labrador

Highway system
- Highways in Newfoundland and Labrador
← Route 1 (TCH)	→ Route 3

Route 2, also known as Pitts Memorial Drive and Peacekeeper's Way, is a 34.2-kilometre-long (21.3 mi) freeway on the Avalon Peninsula of Newfoundland in the Canadian province of Newfoundland and Labrador. The road provides a direct link from the Trans-Canada Highway (TCH) to downtown St. John's, Newfoundland, which was previously accessible only via city streets such as Topsail Road or Kenmount Road (which was part of the TCH until the Outer Ring Road was built). Initially called the Harbour Arterial, construction began in the early 1970s and was completed in 1979. The $52-million project was funded by the federal and provincial governments. It was renamed by the St. John's City Council in 1984 after local businessman James S. Pitts (1847–1914).

The road bypasses Mount Pearl to the south and then runs parallel to the Waterford River on an embankment/cutting along the Southside Hills. It enters the downtown on a concrete viaduct that carries it over the Waterford River valley and the terminus of the former Newfoundland Railway. At the end of the viaduct, it meets New Gower Street which continues into downtown St. John's.

As a major route into and out of the city, the road is subject to heavy traffic and has had its share of unfortunate incidents and shutdowns.

== Route description ==
Route 2 begins as Peacekeeper's Way in Conception Bay South (locally known as C.B.S.) at an at-grade intersection with Route 60 (Conception Bay Highway) in the Seal Cove portion of town. It immediately heads northeast as a two-lane Freeway (super-two) to bypass the town along its southern edge while having interchanges with several local roads, including Route 61 (Foxtrap Access Road) and the Manuels Access Road, where Route 2 wides to a divided four-lane as it enters the town of Paradise. The highway now passes through mainly rural areas before following the Mount Pearl-St. John's city at a large interchange with Route 1 (Trans-Canada Highway). Route 2 now becomes Pitts Memorial Drive and passes through Mount Pearl's southernmost neighbourhoods, where it has an interchange with Route 3 (Robert E Howlett Memorial Drive/Goulds Bypass). This interchange is also proposed to be the eventual southern terminus of Route 3A (Team Gushue Highway). Route 2 now fully enters the St. John's city limits as it passes through farmland just north of Goulds for a few kilometres before entering neighbourhoods at an interchange between Route 10 (Bay Bulls Road) and The Parkway (Columbus Drive) in Kilbride. The highway begins following a ridge overlooking the city as it passes through St. John's southernmost neighbourhoods, crossing over Route 11 (Blackhead Road) without an interchange, before crossing the Waterford River along a concrete viaduct and coming to an end at interchange/at-grade intersection between Water Street, Hamilton Avenue, and New Gower Street in downtown.

== Exit list ==
Except for the Conception Bay Highway and Hamilton Avenue intersections, all intersections are grade-separated. All exits are unnumbered.

Location	km	mi	Destinations	Notes
Conception Bay South	0.0	0.0	Route 60 (Conception Bay Highway) – Holyrood, Seal Cove	At-grade; western terminus; through traffic follows Route 60 west towards Holyrood.
Conception Bay South	2.6	1.6	Lawrence Pond Road	Lance Cove, Lawrence Pond, Upper Gullies
Conception Bay South	5.2	3.2	Legion Road	Keligrews, Riverview
Conception Bay South	7.8	4.8	Route 61 (Foxtrap Access Road)	Southbound To TCH, Northbound To Foxtrap, Peachytown, Codner
Conception Bay South	10.3	6.4	Minerals Road	To Long Pond, Greeleytown
Conception Bay South	13.4	8.3	To Route 60 / Manuels Access Road	Westbound exit, eastbound entrance. To Manuals, Talcville, Alternate Access To Topsail, Chamberlains
Conception Bay South	14.4	8.9	Fowlers Road	To Three Island Pond, Topsail, Chamberlains, Woodstock
Mount Pearl – St. John's boundary	19.7	12.2	Route 1 (TCH) (Outer Ring Road) – St. John's, Clarenville, Gander	Exit 41 A/B on Route 1
Mount Pearl – St. John's boundary	19.7	12.2	East end of Peacekeeper's Way • West end of Pitts Memorial Drive	
Mount Pearl – St. John's boundary	22.2	13.8	Ruth Avenue	To Glenhill, Glendale, Galway
Mount Pearl – St. John's boundary	23.7	14.7	Richard Nolan Drive / Ruby Line – Goulds	Richard Nolan Drive To Merchant Drive, Access To Southlands, And Ruby Line To Goulds, Kilbride
Mount Pearl – St. John's boundary	25.4	15.8	Route 3 south (Heavy Tree Rd / Commonwealth Avenue / Robert E. Howlett Memorial Drive) – Goulds	Southern terminus of Route 3A (Team Gushue Highway); northern terminus of Route 3
St. John's	29.2	18.1	To Route 10 (Bay Bulls Road) – Kilbride	Eastbound right-in/right-out
St. John's	29.6	18.4	Route 10 south (Bay Bulls Road) / Columbus Drive (Parkway) – Kilbride	No eastbound exit; northern terminus of Route 10; southern terminus of The Parkway
St. John's	34.1	21.2	Water Street east to Harbour Drive	Eastbound exit only
St. John's	34.2	21.3	Hamilton Avenue	At-grade; westbound access to Water Street; eastern terminus
St. John's	34.2	21.3	Continues as New Gower Street	
1.000 mi = 1.609 km; 1.000 km = 0.621 mi: Incomplete access; Route transition
