= Newfoundland and Labrador Route 63 =

Highway in Newfoundland and Labrador, Canada

Route 63
- Avondale Access Road

Route information
- Maintained by Newfoundland and Labrador Department of Transportation and Infrastructure
- Length: 7.6 km (4.7 mi)

Major junctions
- South end: Route 1 (TCH) in Avondale
- North end: Route 60 in Avondale

Location
- Country: Canada
- Province: Newfoundland and Labrador

Highway system
- Highways in Newfoundland and Labrador
← Route 62	→ Route 70

Route 63, also known as Avondale Access Road, is a short 7.6-kilometre-long (4.7 mi) north-south highway that connects the town of Avondale, Newfoundland and Labrador to the Trans Canada Highway.

== Route description ==
Route 63 begins at an interchange with Route 1 (Trans Canada Highway, Exit 34). It heads northeast to pass by Eastbound International Speedway before winding its way through wooded areas for a few kilometres. The highway continues north to pass through neighbourhoods before entering downtown, where Route 63 comes to an end along the coastline at an intersection with Route 60 (Conception Bay Highway).

== Major intersections ==
The entire route is in Avondale.

km	mi	Destinations	Notes
0.0	0.0	Route 1 (TCH) – Clarenville, St. John's	Exit 34 on Route 1; southern terminus
7.6	4.7	Route 60 (Conception Bay Highway) – Brigus, Harbour Main-Chapel's Cove-Lakeview	Northern terminus
1.000 mi = 1.609 km; 1.000 km = 0.621 mi

== See also ==
- List of highways numbered 63
