= Ballyhack =

Ballyhack may refer to:

- Ballyhack, County Wexford, Ireland, a village
- Ballyhack, Newfoundland and Labrador, Canada, a small settlement
- Informal local name for the Belfast suburb of Ballyhackamore
