= Newfoundland and Labrador Route 50 =

Highway in Newfoundland and Labrador, Canada

Route 50
- Thorburn Road; St. Thomas Line

Route information
- Maintained by Newfoundland and Labrador Department of Transportation and Infrastructure
- Length: 20.2 km (12.6 mi)

Major junctions
- West end: Route 60 in Paradise
- Route 41 in Portugal Cove–St. Philip's; Route 1 (TCH) in St. John's; The Parkway in St. John's
- East end: Freshwater Road/Kenmount Road in St. John's

Location
- Country: Canada
- Province: Newfoundland and Labrador

Highway system
- Highways in Newfoundland and Labrador
← Route 41	→ Route 60

Route 50, also known as Thorburn Road and St. Thomas Line, is a 20.2-kilometre-long (12.6 mi) east-west highway on the Avalon Peninsula of Newfoundland in the Canadian province of Newfoundland and Labrador. It extends from the city of St. John's west to Paradise.

== Route description ==
Route 50 begins in the town of Paradise at an intersection with Route 60 (Topsail Road). It heads north as St. Thomas Line through neighbourhoods to cross into Portugal Cove-St. Philips, where it passes through the St. Philips portion of town to have an intersection with Route 41 (Tuckers Hill Road), which leads to the Bell Island Ferry, and becomes Thorburn Road. The highway now winds its way southeast through rural areas to enter the St. John's city limits at an interchange with Route 1 (Trans-Canada Highway/Outer Ring Road, Exit 44). Route 50 continues east through neighbourhoods to cross over Route 3A (Team Gushue Highway) without an interchange and have an intersection with Goldstone Street. It now enters a business district as it passes by the Avalon Mall to have an intersection with The Parkway (Columbus Drive/Prince Philip Drive). The highway now curves to the curves to the south and comes to an end shortly thereafter at an intersection between Kenmount Road and Freshwater Road (former Route 1).

A small section of Thorburn Road branches off of Tuckers Hill Road (Route 41) toward Broad Cove, though this part becomes Thorpes Road before reaching the cove.

== Major intersections ==
Location	km	mi	Destinations	Notes
Paradise	0.0	0.0	Route 60 (Topsail Road) – Conception Bay South, Mount Pearl	Western terminus
Portugal Cove-St. Philips	8.4	5.2	Route 41 north (Tuckers Hill Road) – Portugal Cove, Bell Island Ferry	Southern terminus of Route 41
St. John's	15.0– 15.3	9.3– 9.5	Route 1 (TCH) (Outer Ring Road) – Downtown, Clarenville	Exit 44 on Route 1
St. John's	18.4	11.4	Goldstone Street To Route 3A (Team Gushue Highway)	Continues To Kelsey Drive, And Ends At Kenmount Road.
St. John's	20.0	12.4	The Parkway (Columbus Drive/Prince Philip Drive)	
St. John's	20.2	12.6	Kenmount Road/Freshwater Road - Mount Pearl/Downtown	Eastern terminus; former Route 1 (Trans-Canada Highway)
1.000 mi = 1.609 km; 1.000 km = 0.621 mi
