= Newfoundland and Labrador Route 41 =

Highway in Newfoundland and Labrador, Canada

Route 41
- Tuckers Hill Road; Beachy Cove Road

Route information
- Maintained by Newfoundland and Labrador Department of Transportation and Infrastructure
- Length: 5.4 km (3.4 mi)

Major junctions
- South end: Route 50 in Portugal Cove-St. Philips
- North end: Route 40 in Portugal Cove-St. Philips

Location
- Country: Canada
- Province: Newfoundland and Labrador

Highway system
- Highways in Newfoundland and Labrador
← Route 40	→ Route 50

Route 41, also known as Tuckers Hill Road and Beachy Cove Road, is a 5.4-kilometre-long (3.4 mi) north-south highway located entirely in the town of Portugal Cove-St. Philips on the island of Newfoundland, linking the Portugal Cove and St. Philips portions of town.

== Route description ==
Route 41 begins as Tuckers Hill Road in the St. Philips portion of town at an intersection with Route 50 (St. Thomas Line/Thorburn Road). It winds its way through hilly terrain through neighbourhoods before having a Y-Intersection with Witch Hazel Drive, where the road becomes Beachy Cove Road. The highway now winds its way along the coast to enter the Portugal Cove portion of town. Route 41 comes to an end shortly thereafter at an intersection with Route 40 (Portugal Cove Road/Ferry Terminal Road), directly beside the Bell Island Ferry terminal.

== Major intersections ==
The entire route is in Portugal Cove-St. Philips.

km	mi	Destinations	Notes
0.0	0.0	Route 50 (St. Thomas Line/Thorburn Road) – Paradise, St. John's	Southern terminus
5.4	3.4	Route 40 (Portugal Cove Road) – St. John's, Bell Island Ferry	Northern terminus
1.000 mi = 1.609 km; 1.000 km = 0.621 mi
