= Mount Pearl =

- City
- City of Mount Pearl
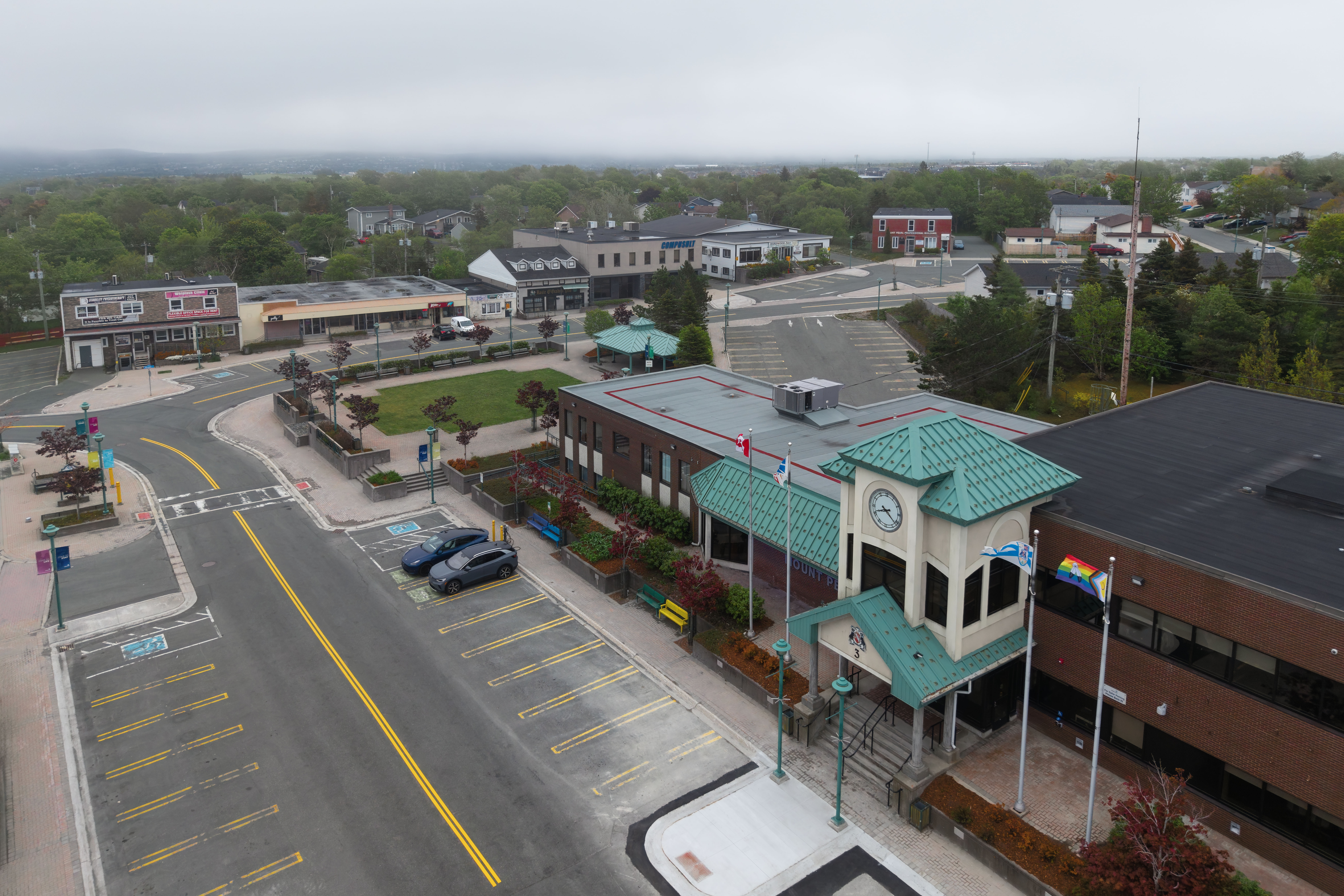
- Downtown (2026)

- Flag Seal Coat of arms
- Motto: "Omnia ad Dei gloriam" (Latin) "All things for the glory of God"
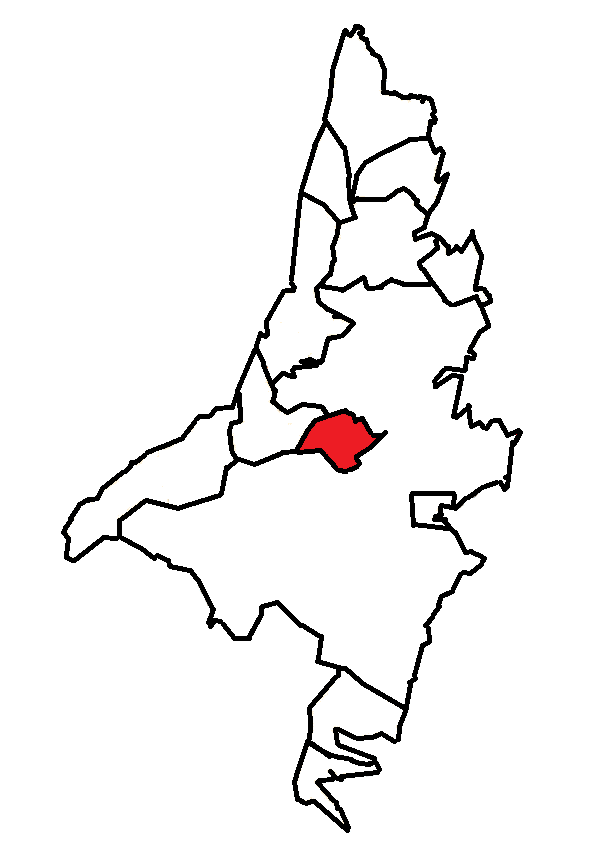
- Location of Mount Pearl (red) in the St. John's Metropolitan Area

- Location of Mount Pearl in Newfoundland
- Coordinates: 47°31′08″N 52°48′21″W
- Country: Canada
- Province: Newfoundland and Labrador
- Census division: 1
- Settled: 1834
- Incorporated (town): January 11, 1955
- Incorporated (city): July 21, 1988

Government
  - Mayor: Dave Aker
  - MHA: Lucy Stoyles (LIB); Paul Lane (IND)
  - MP: Tom Osborne (LIB)

Area
  - Land: 15.65 km^{2} (6.04 sq mi)

Population (2021)
  - Total: 22,477
  - Density: 1,436.2/km^{2} (3,720/sq mi)
- Time zone: UTC-3:30 (Newfoundland Time)
  - Summer (DST): UTC-2:30 (Newfoundland Daylight)
- Forward Sortation Area: A1N
- Area code: 709
- Highways: Route 1 (TCH); Route 2 Route 3 Route 3A (Team Gushue Highway); Route 60 Kenmount Road
- Website: mountpearl.ca

Mount Pearl is the fourth-largest municipality and second-largest city in Newfoundland and Labrador, Canada. The city is located southwest of St. John's, on the eastern tip of the Avalon Peninsula on the island of Newfoundland. Mount Pearl is the fourth largest municipality in the province and is part of the St. John's metropolitan area, the 22nd largest metropolitan area in Canada.

== History ==
Mount Pearl dates back to 1829, when Commander James Pearl and his wife, Lady Anne Pearl, arrived in Newfoundland with a Crown grant of 1,000 acres (4.0 km^{2}) of land, a reward for Commander Pearl's 27 years of distinguished service in the Royal Navy. In 1830, Commander Pearl built a house upon the most elevated section of his estate and named it Mount Cochrane in honour of then-governor Sir Thomas Cochrane.

After the governor left Newfoundland, Pearl renamed the site Mount Pearl. Pearl was made a Knight of the Royal Guelphic Order of Hanover and received the honour of Knight Bachelor from Queen Victoria. He died suddenly at his Mount Pearl estate on January 13, 1840, at the age of 50 years. In 1844, Sir James Pearl's wife, Lady Anne, moved to London, England. John Lester, who had come from Devon, England to work for James Pearl, continued working the Pearl Estate, leasing it from Lady Anne Pearl for another 14 years.

In her will, she left John Lester 100 acres (0.40 km^{2}) of land called "Anna Vale", (present day Glendale) which he later sold. The Pearl estate eventually came into the hands of Andrew Glendinning, who worked it as successful farmland well into the 1920s. John Lester purchased other land (124 acres opposite the Pearl Estate on Brookfield Road) from Edward Dunscomb and later inherited another 50 acres (200,000 m^{2}) on Old Placentia Road (present day Admiralty Wood) from Pearl's sister, Eunice Blamey.

John Lester died in 1893 leaving his estate, called "FairMead", to sons Ashton and James. Fairmead is the site of Lester's Market today.

=== Development ===
In the 1930s and 1940s, Mount Pearl became the meeting place of affluent members of society and lovers of horseracing. A large open air gallery, with benches for spectators to view surrounding lands was erected on "The Mount" in the 1940s. Horseracing continued to be prominent and Mount Pearl began to develop into something of a summer resort for St. John's residents. Increased population during summer months led to increased population year round and eventual residential and industrial development.

=== Incorporation ===
With the population growing quickly, there was increased demand for municipal government. As a result, Mount Pearl held its first election in 1955 which resulted in Hayward Burrage becoming the first mayor of the Town of Mount Pearl. The town was incorporated on January 11, 1955 and had population of 1,979. On July 21, 1988, the Town of Mount Pearl became the third community in Newfoundland and Labrador to be granted city status. Today, it remains one of the largest cities within the province, with a population in 2021 of 22,477.

== Geography ==
Mount Pearl is located in the northeastern region of the Avalon Peninsula in southeast Newfoundland. It is landlocked, being about midway between the Atlantic Ocean coast to the east and Conception Bay to the west. The city is bounded on the north, south and east by the city of St. John's and on the west by the town of Paradise, which has led to limited availability of undeveloped land, forcing the city to adopt a more urban, high-density planning structure.

Southlands, a neighbourhood in St. John's was a large part of Mount Pearl's future growth plans for filling in the area between its boundary and Cochrane Pond Provincial Park. In 1998, the Provincial Government granted the land to the City of St. John's.

=== Climate ===
Mount Pearl has a humid continental climate (Dfb) with short, mild summers and long, cold winters.

Climate data for Mount Pearl
Month	Jan	Feb	Mar	Apr	May	Jun	Jul	Aug	Sep	Oct	Nov	Dec	Year
Record high °C (°F)	18 (64)	15 (59)	17 (63)	25 (77)	29 (84)	32 (90)	33 (91)	31 (88)	30 (86)	26 (79)	22 (72)	19 (66)	33 (91)
Mean daily maximum °C (°F)	0.6 (33.1)	0.1 (32.2)	2.2 (36.0)	7.0 (44.6)	12.3 (54.1)	17.2 (63.0)	23.1 (73.6)	22.2 (72.0)	18.4 (65.1)	12.2 (54.0)	7.6 (45.7)	3.1 (37.6)	10.5 (50.9)
Mean daily minimum °C (°F)	−6.3 (20.7)	−6.6 (20.1)	−4.5 (23.9)	−0.4 (31.3)	3.1 (37.6)	7.8 (46.0)	13.0 (55.4)	13.7 (56.7)	10.2 (50.4)	6.1 (43.0)	1.4 (34.5)	−3.2 (26.2)	2.9 (37.2)
Record low °C (°F)	−20.3 (−4.5)	−21 (−6)	−19.5 (−3.1)	−13 (9)	−5.2 (22.6)	−2.4 (27.7)	2.1 (35.8)	2.6 (36.7)	1.7 (35.1)	−4.6 (23.7)	−11.5 (11.3)	−18.6 (−1.5)	−21 (−6)
Source: Environment Canada

== Demographics ==
Historical populations
Year	Pop.	±%
1956	1,979	—
1961	2,785	+40.7%
1966	4,428	+59.0%
1971	7,211	+62.9%
1976	10,193	+41.4%
1981	11,543	+13.2%
1986	20,293	+75.8%
1991	23,689	+16.7%
1996	25,531	+7.8%
2001	24,964	−2.2%
2006	24,671	−1.2%
2011	24,284	−1.6%
2016	23,120	−4.8%
2021	22,477	−2.8%
Source: Statistics Canada

In the 2021 Census of Population conducted by Statistics Canada, Mount Pearl had a population of 22,477 living in 9,931 of its 10,685 total private dwellings, a change of −2.8% from its 2016 population of 23,120. With a land area of 15.65 km^{2} (6.04 sq mi), it had a population density of 1,436.2/km^{2} (3,719.8/sq mi) in 2021.

In 2016, Mount Pearl was 92.7% White, 5.6% Aboriginal, and 1.7% other. The median age was 44.5 in 2016 and 41.6 in 2011. The median income was $78,232 before taxes in 2016, with a median income of $67,055 after taxes in 2016.

== Government ==
The city is represented by a mayor, deputy mayor and five councillors. Elections in Mount Pearl are held every four years on the last Tuesday in September, the last election was held on October 2, 2025. The current mayor, Dave Aker, has been in office since 2017.

The 2025 election saw the re-election of all 6 incumbent Councillors:

- Nicole Kieley (2021)
- Jim Locke (2007)
- Isabelle Fry (2017)
- Chelsea Lane (2021)
- Mark Rice (2021)
- Bill Antle (2017)

== Notable people ==
- David Cochrane, CBC News reporter and anchor
- Zach Dean, pro hockey player in the Vegas Golden Knights system
- Brad Gushue, Canadian curler, three-time Tim Hortons Brier champion, and 2006 gold medal skip
- Terry Ryan, retired pro hockey player whose career included eight games with the Montreal Canadiens
