= Charles Henry Danielle =

Newfoundland dressmaker and resort owner (1830–1902)

- Danielle in costume as Neptune
- Born: November 1, 1830; Baltimore, Maryland, U.S.
- Died: May 1, 1902 (aged 71); Topsail, Newfoundland Colony
- Other name: Professor Danielle
- Occupations: Costume designer, restauranteur, hotel owner
- Known for: Owning and operating Octagon Castle

Charles Henry Danielle (November 1, 1830 – May 1, 1902) was a American-born dance instructor, costume designer, restauranteur, and hotel owner in Newfoundland. A prominent and enigmatic figure in late 19th-century St. John's, Danielle was well known for his lavish establishments, elaborate ceremonies, and lively personality.

From poorly documented origins in Baltimore, Danielle operated a dancing academy in Chicago in his youth, and he was known as "the Professor" for the rest of his life. In the 1860s, he set up shop in St. John's, teaching dance classes and advertising dressmaking services, before purchasing a skating rink where he would host elaborate balls and carnivals. Although initially forced out of Newfoundland when his establishment burnt down in 1878, Danielle returned in 1888 and operated several successful restaurants in downtown St. John's. He ran into conflict with his lessor and commissioned a new home in Topsail Road, which he opened as a resort called Octagon Castle in 1896. The establishment's most noteworthy display was Danielle's personal coffin decorated with black satin and golden trim. Following Danielle's death at Octagon Castle in 1902, he was interred in this very coffin. He had legally adopted Frederick A. Brazil, one of his employees, as his heir.

Danielle was credited by contemporaries and 20th-century historians with significantly raising the standards of Newfoundland's hospitality industry, and queer historians in the 21st century have examined Danielle's place in the province's LGBTQ history. Although Octagon Castle was destroyed by fire in 1915, an abstract art installation near Octagon Pond in Paradise commemorates Danielle's former resort.

== Early life and initial business ventures (1830–1888) ==
Danielle's origins and his life in the United States before arriving in Newfoundland are somewhat obscure, and some of his friends believed that he used his theatrical stage name as an alias. However, according to the Dictionary of Canadian Biography, he was born on November 1, 1830, in Baltimore, Maryland as the youngest of six children to Joseph and Isabel Danielle. He is believed to have first performed in the theatre at the age of 14. By 1850, he had moved to Chicago, Illinois and opened a dancing academy where he advertised himself with the dignified title of "Professor of the Terpsichorean Art." Danielle would continue to be called "the Professor" for the remainder of his life.

A newspaper advertisement for one of Danielle's carnivals, 1878

Cover of a brochure advertising one of Danielle's exhibitions in New York, 1888

Danielle immigrated to St. John's, Newfoundland sometime in the early 1860s. The small British colony with a developing economy primarily known for the cod fishery off the Grand Banks was an odd destination for a dancing teacher. Michael Harrington speculated that the attention brought to the island from Cyrus W. Field's Atlantic Telegraph Company and the recent establishment of the first transatlantic telegraph cable might have stirred a sense of wanderlust in the young Professor. In addition to teaching dance classes in St. John's, Danielle also found work as a dressmaker and costume designer for the community's upper class as well as its nascent theatre scene. He quickly became well known for his eccentric personality, which he expressed through his letters to local newspapers.

In the 1870s, Danielle leased the Avalon and Victoria skating rinks in Bannerman Park. He operated the former as a costume rental store and the latter as a place for his dance classes. Under Danielle's management, the Victoria Rink became a social venue for elaborate ice-themed carnivals and dance balls. However, the rinks were destroyed by fire in the morning of July 16, 1878, and Danielle lost his many self-designed (but insured) costumes. Although he had acquired a genial reputation as a master showman, contemporary newspapers had suspected that the fire had been deliberately set by someone with a grievance against Danielle.

Following the fire, Danielle left Newfoundland and returned to the United States to continue his costume designing practice in Fulton Street, Brooklyn, New York City. He similarly hosted East Asian-themed costume balls across the state of New York during the 1880s.

== Return to Newfoundland as a restauranteur and hotelier (1888–1895) ==
Danielle returned to St. John's on May 31, 1888. Reportedly, he asked "Is the fire out?" when walking down the gangplank at St. John's harbour. Danielle's return to Newfoundland was heralded by his former pupils and it was celebrated with a "grand oriental costume ball" in August 1888. Among its attendees was Governor of Newfoundland Henry Arthur Blake who had remarked to Danielle that, next to the theatre at Drury Lane, it was the "best [show] he had ever witnessed." Danielle then entered the restaurant business with the Royal Restaurant on Water Street, a high-end establishment with regal decor. Although popular, the Royal was also destroyed in the Great Fire of 1892. Undeterred, Danielle reopened the restaurant in a smaller building at Beck's Cove, St. John's, which was frequently nicknamed the "Little Royal" or "Small Royal." Danielle was sensitive to criticism and meticulous about the quality of his interior decoration. By his own account, Danielle was taunted by some members of the public for his overly ornate sense of taste: "I was called a fool and my satins and laces were styled 'refuse,' and that too by an M.P."

The Royal Lake Pavilion at Quidi Vidi Lake, c. 1893–94

Feeling that he and his clientele were stifled by the inadequate venue, Danielle moved his place of operations to a larger pavilion on the outskirts of the city by Quidi Vidi Lake. Expanding his business into a country estate for wealthy excursionists, the Royal Lake Pavilion featured a 60-by-40 foot dining room and ballroom supported by eight columns. However, he came into conflict with a fellow inn owner and neighbour from whom he had leased the property, who apparently regularly harassed both Danielle and his staff. Danielle remarked that he was "hooted at, groaned at, and barked at [...] by the very man from whom I leased the land, and why? Why! Because I ran a similar business to his and because I ran it thousands of miles superior to his."

In addition to his restaurants, Danielle also taught "serious" dancing classes in St. John's and in the rural outports of Conception Bay. He and his students would regularly stage ballet performances. In 1890, one reporter for the Harbour Grace Standard recorded that "[I]t seemed as if a scene of eastern splendor had suddenly burst upon their gaze." Still, Danielle felt isolated within the insular community of St. John's, once asserting that he was "never referred to but as 'the old feller on the hill'" while at Quidi Vidi.

== Octagon Castle (1896–1902) ==
Irritated by his disputes with his neighbours, Danielle closed the Royal Lake Pavilion in 1895 and moved to a new property next to a pond off Topsail Road about 10 miles from St. John's. He transported some of the structural remains of the pavilion through the Newfoundland Railway and, supplementing it with the surrounding timber, built a hotel resort called Octagon Castle. Danielle's newest business officially opened in June 1896 with a ceremony hosted by premier William Whiteway, who praised the Professor for "placing such a lovely resort at the service of the public."

The staff at Octagon Castle at the front entrance

Octagon Castle's distinctive interior and exterior design was the subject of several contemporary magazine and newspaper columns. The four-story, 3,750-square-foot building was so named for its octagonal tower comprising the main reception area and reading room. Intricate gold and silver satin banners sewn by Danielle himself lined the walls which were once described by a magazine columnist as being so meticulous that they "almost passed human conception." During the summer months, a band played in the rotunda. Three wings extended from the main tower which led to a ballroom, a beauty salon, and a large banquet hall and bar decorated with "Chinese lanterns, paper fans, colored balls and pendants and silk banners." A winding staircase led to a bridal chamber on the second floor, which was to be reserved for wedding couples on their honeymoon. The quilt on the chamber's bed was made up of satin shells "of every imaginable color" overlapping "like the scales of a fish," all without visible stitching. Danielle told reporters that he had made the quilt himself over the course of two-and-a-half years, and that it had cost $700 or $800 to make.

Danielle's assistant, Frederick A. Brazil, standing over Danielle's coffin in Octagon Castle

One of the most unusual features of Octagon Castle was Danielle's mortuary chamber on the third floor. Although normally locked behind closed doors, Danielle would eagerly show visitors the room upon request and would allow public access during special events. The room featured Danielle's personal coffin, which was decorated with black satin embroidered with gold and upholstered by about 7,425 white satin shells. It had a glass lid with a pillow sitting at the head, a white quilt lining the interior, and a white robe with golden slippers comprising his burial dress. A gilt frame hung above the coffin that read "In the back of this Frame will be found Full instructions to be followed Immediately after my death." Danielle supposedly encouraged curious visitors to lie in his coffin, and it was rumoured that he would sleep in it.

The Professor's resort became a popular weekend destination for upper- and middle-class residents of St. John's. Continuing to identify as an American, he was especially kind to American tourists and hosted parties for American Independence Day on July 4. While Danielle was an amicable host, he held many reservations about the ways in which his guests conducted themselves at his resort. Danielle often joked that drunk or rowdy visitors caused such a problem that "I have buried broken bottles until I can't get a whole angle worm to catch a trout. They are all cut up in[to] bits." On display at the reception room was a list of "Don't's," which included such items as:

Don't bring flasks in your pockets: the Professor keeps Strang's, Bennette's and Gaden's best.
Don't overload your stomachs before coming to the Octagon.
Don't bring any growlers; they keep me awake [at] nights. [...]
Don't say you didn't get enough to eat at the Octagon: there is always enough there for an army and to spare.
Don't drink water. If you don't like beer or spirits, drink Gaden's lemonade or Octagon lemonade.
Don't think the Octagon was built to be run for you alone; the Professor thinks he knows how to run it under a first-class record.
Don't leave the table until you are too full for utterance.
Don't say that everything you get at the Octagon was rotten. Everything you get there is fresh. Even the Professor is fresh, but not too fresh.

Much as he was with his previous establishments, Danielle was offended by dissatisfied or belligerent guests. The bridal chamber had apparently only been used for its intended purpose as a honeymoon suite just once. When the Professor charged $8 for a newlywed couple who had stayed for two days, they balked and insisted that they be billed for half that much. Danielle subsequently declared that "[t]here will be no more 'honeymoons' spent here. No, not even a 'molasses moon' or a 'brown sugar' moon."

== Death and legacy ==
Danielle with his assistant and heir Brazil

As Danielle had no relatives in Newfoundland, newspapers covering the splendour of his estate speculated about who would inherit the business after his death. He told The Globe in 1898 that he would "like to adopt a well brought up, honest, intelligent American lad who would be a son to me and carry on this property after I am dead." Shortly before his death, Danielle adopted his assistant Frederick A. Brazil as his son and bequeathed Octagon Castle to him in his last will and testament. Some stories state that Danielle had predicted his date of death by declaring that he would die one year later on May 1, 1901, exactly one year before his death at Octagon Castle.

As per the instructions left in the mortuary room, Danielle's funeral procession brought his gilded coffin to the railway station in St. John's, and his funeral was attended by thousands of spectators. He had appointed "my oldest acquaintances here in Newfoundland" as his pallbearers, which included many of the most prominent public figures in the colony such as Premier Whiteway, the former premiers James S. Winter and Daniel J. Greene, opposition leader Alfred B. Morine, as well as George H. Emerson and James S. Pitts. Danielle was buried at the Forest Road Anglican Cemetery near the site of his former Royal Lake Pavilion.

Brazil continued to operate Octagon Castle, and although it continued to be successful, he did not further develop its unusual qualities and it remained in the shadow of its iconic founder. The resort was destroyed by fire in 1915. Now long gone, Octagon Castle became the namesake of the nearby Octagon Pond, and the town ofParadise eventually grew around the area. In 2022, an abstract octagonal monument was erected in the centre of the town's roundabout in dedication to Octagon Castle.

Historians documenting Danielle's lavish enterprises and eccentric quirks have generally conceded that he was a successful businessman who significantly raised the standards of Newfoundland's small hospitality industry. Writing for the Atlantic Guardian in 1952, Michael Murphy characterised Danielle as having a persecution complex, but noted that he was ahead of his time as both a hotelier and a marketer. Scholars of LGBTQ history have more recently taken an interest in the Professor's potential homosexuality. Following Danielle's death, Brazil began a correspondence with Danielle's old friend Clarence Waugh who told him that the Professor had had romantic relationships with other men. Harrington noted in 1945 that Danielle's eccentricities led some visitors to doubt whether he was a man at all. Memorial University student Sarah Worthman, the founder of the provincial Queer History Archive, dedicated its first collection to him and his businesses.
