= Parkway (St. John's) =

Road in the city of St. John's, Newfoundland and Labrador

Coordinates: 47.568°N 52.7441°W

The Parkway is a major arterial road in the city of St. John's, Newfoundland and Labrador. It consists of three distinct roads that form a single through route: Columbus Drive, Prince Philip Drive, and Macdonald Drive. A four-lane expressway with a speed limit of 70 km/h along most of its length, the parkway begins at an intersection with Pitts Memorial Drive in the city's west end and terminates at Logy Bay Road in the east end.

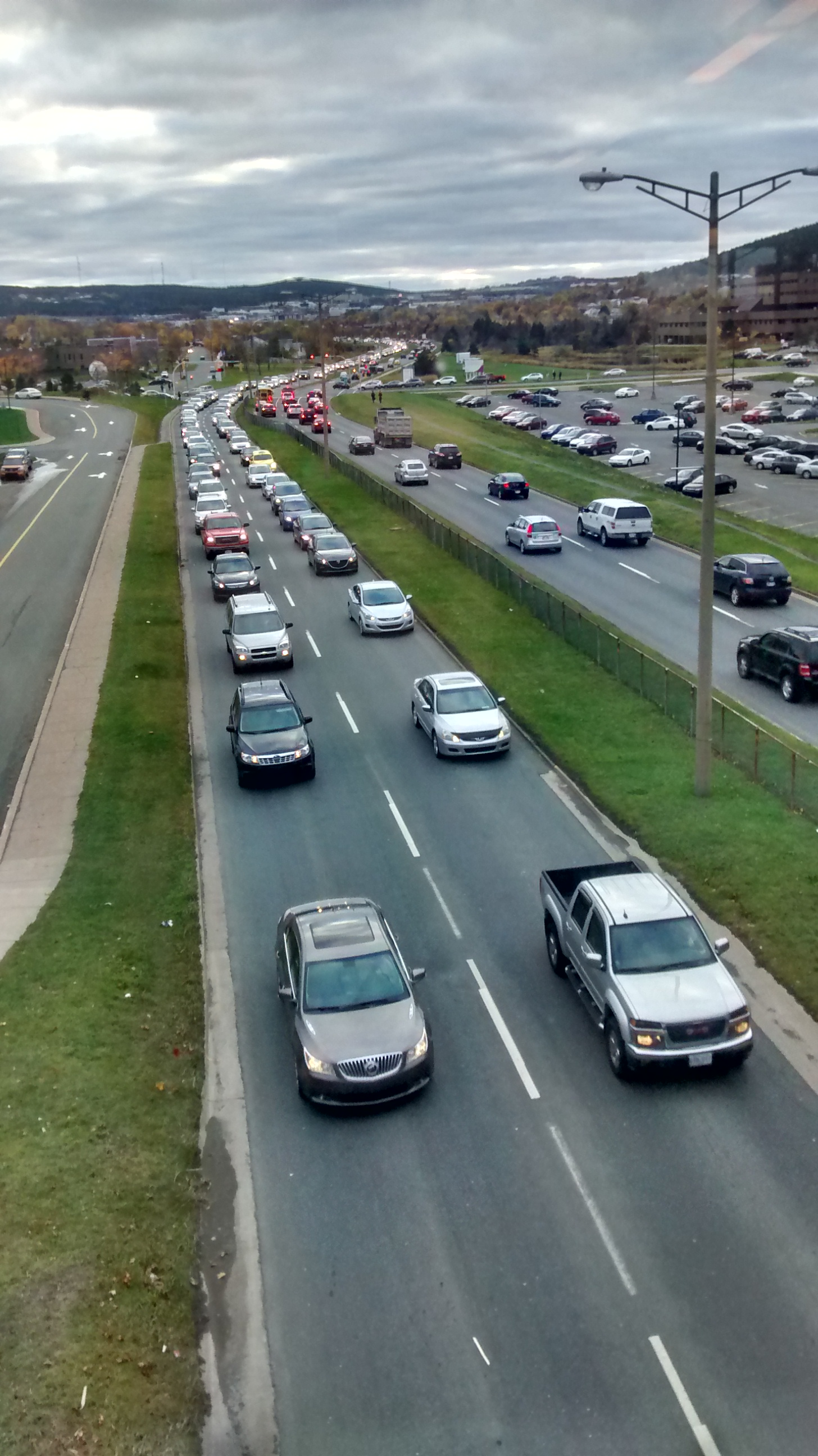
Prince Philip Drive during the rush hour on Oct 31, 2014. Photo taken from the food court at Memorial University of Newfoundland.

== Segments ==
Columbus Drive runs in a general south-to-north direction from Pitts Memorial Drive to Thorburn Road. It passes Bowring Park, the Village Mall, the edge of the west end residential area, and the Avalon Mall. Also known as the Crosstown Arterial, Columbus Drive was constructed in order to improve traffic circulation in the city by linking Kenmount Road and Prince Philip Drive with Topsail Road and Pitts Memorial Drive. Built on land purchased by the city in 1970, the road was opened in December 1981.

Prince Philip Drive, constructed in the late 1960s, runs in an east-west direction from Thorburn Road to Portugal Cove Road. Passing through Pippy Park, Prince Philip Drive provides access to several significant institutions: the Health Sciences Centre and Janeway Children's Hospital, the CBC's St. John's studios, the main Memorial University of Newfoundland campus, the St. John's Arts and Culture Centre, the Confederation Building, and the College of the North Atlantic.

Macdonald Drive runs in an east-west direction from Portugal Cove Road to Logy Bay Road. Unlike Columbus Drive and Prince Philip Drive, Macdonald Drive is not a limited-access road and is intersected by several residential side streets.

== Safety ==
In 2006, seven of the ten most dangerous intersections in the city of St. John's were located on the Parkway. In order of severity, these were:

- Allandale Road at Prince Philip Drive (ranking 3)
- Columbus Drive at Old Pennywell Road (ranking 4)
- Prince Philip Drive at Thorburn Road (ranking 5)
- Columbus Drive at Topsail Road (ranking 6)
- Columbus Drive at Mundy Pond Road (ranking 7)
- Prince Philip Drive-Macdonald Drive at Portugal Cove Road (ranking 9)
- Prince Philip Drive at Clinch-Westerland (ranking 10)

In 2013, five of the ten most dangerous intersections in the city of St. John's were located on the Parkway. In order of severity, these were:

- Columbus Drive at Topsail Road (ranking 2)
- Allandale Road at Prince Philip Drive (ranking 5)
- Prince Philip Drive at Thorburn Road (ranking 6)
- Blackmarsh Road at Columbus Drive (ranking 8)
- Macdonald Drive at Torbay Road (ranking 9)

== Intersections ==
The following roads intersect with the Parkway. Macdonald Drive is also intersected by several residential side streets, which are not listed in the table.

Segment	Intersecting Road
Columbus Drive	Route 2 (Pitts Memorial Drive) (road continues south as Route 10)
Columbus Drive	Bay Bulls Road (to Waterford Bridge Road)
Columbus Drive	Route 60 (Topsail Road)
Columbus Drive	Canada Drive
Columbus Drive	Captain Whelan Drive / Hogan Street
Columbus Drive	Blackmarsh Road
Columbus Drive	Mundy Pond Road
Columbus Drive	Empire Avenue (two separate non-signalized T-intersections)
Columbus Drive	Old Pennywell Road (to Empire Avenue); Brier Avenue (to Route 3A (Team Gushue Highway))
Columbus Drive	Wishingwell Road (to Freshwater Road)
Prince Philip Drive	Route 50 (Thorburn Road) (to Freshwater Road and Kenmount Road)
Prince Philip Drive	Wicklow Street
Prince Philip Drive	Clinch Crescent (west)
Prince Philip Drive	University Avenue
Prince Philip Drive	Clinch Crescent (east) / Westerland Road (Memorial University of Newfoundland)
Prince Philip Drive	Morrissey Road / Livyer's Loop (Memorial University of Newfoundland)
Prince Philip Drive	Allandale Road (Memorial University of Newfoundland)
Prince Philip Drive	Confederation Building access
Prince Philip Drive	Route 40 (Portugal Cove Road) (to airport)
Macdonald Drive	Route 20 (Torbay Road) (to Torbay)
Macdonald Drive	Route 30 (Logy Bay Road) (end)

== See also ==
- Royal eponyms in Canada—locales in Canada named for royalty akin to Prince Philip Drive within the Parkway
