= Avondale, Newfoundland and Labrador =

Avondale
- Town
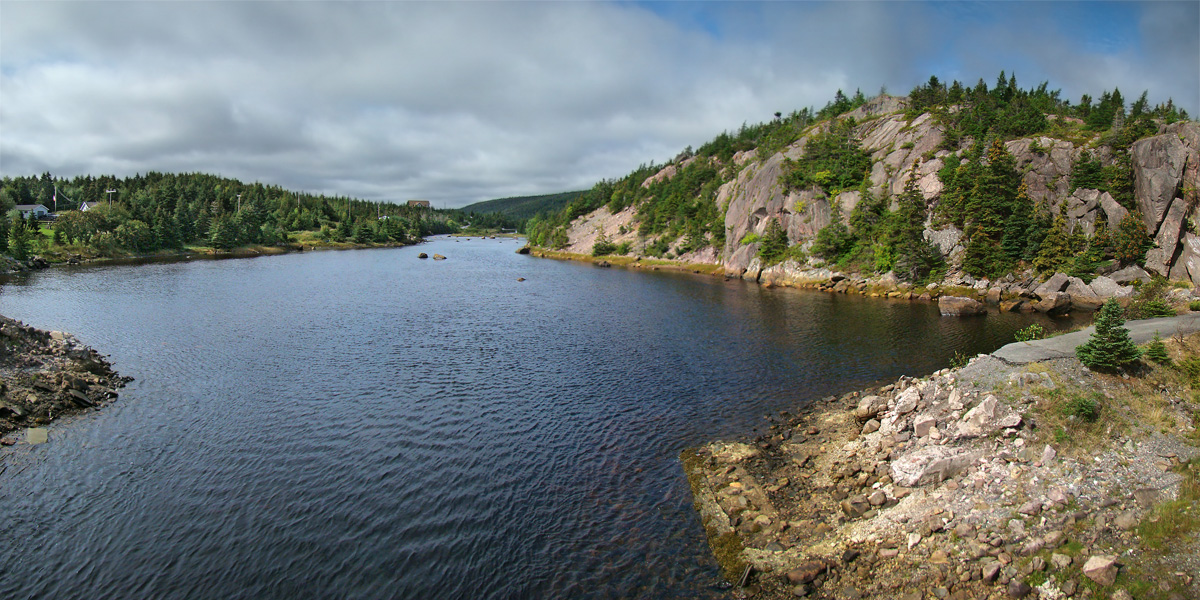
- River flow toward Conception Bay

- Coat of arms

- Location of Avondale in Newfoundland
- Coordinates: 47°25′08″N 53°11′38″W
- Country: Canada
- Province: Newfoundland and Labrador
- Census division: 1

Government
  - Mayor: Owen Mahoney

Area
  - Land: 29.98 km^{2} (11.58 sq mi)

Population (2021)
  - Total: 584
  - Density: 21.4/km^{2} (55/sq mi)
- Time zone: UTC-3:30 (Newfoundland Time)
  - Summer (DST): UTC-2:30 (Newfoundland Daylight)
- Area code: 709
- Highways: Route 1 (TCH); Route 60; Route 63

Avondale is a town located on Newfoundland's Avalon Peninsula in the province of Newfoundland and Labrador, Canada, which was incorporated in 1974. The community is situated at the southwestern head of Conception Bay in Division 1. It is located 59 km (37 mi) southwest of St. John's and 72 km (45 mi) northeast of Placentia.

Up to 1897, the community was known as Salmon Cove, but was renamed to avoid confusion with two other nearby communities of the same name in the Port de Grave and Brigus Districts. The name Avondale was suggested by the parish priest Rev John Roe because of the resemblance to his native area in Ireland, taking the name from Thomas Moore's poem, "The Meeting of the Waters". Earliest record of settlement per Fishing Room Grants is for John Mahaney in 1773, a census of 1812 reports 12 inhabitants. Settlers to the area were primarily Irish Roman Catholic with a smaller number of Jersey French and English. Avondale incorporated the communities of Salmon Cove, Gasters, Northern Arm, and Southern Arm.

In addition to the railway station, it the town hosted a post office, a money order office, and one church. It functioned as a lumbering, fishing and farming settlement in what was known as the Harbour Main District. The population dwindled in the early 1900s as men began migrating to the eastern US (Boston and New York) to find work.

Its first postmaster was Edward Kennedy who came to the area in 1889 after the railway was built.

== Avondale Railway Station Registered Heritage Structure ==
Circa 1865, the Anglo American Telegraph Company set up a repeater station in Avondale.

In 1881, the Newfoundland Railway conducted a survey of the land and planning preparations were started for constructing a railway out to Harbour Grace, in which Salmon Cove was seen as a convenient place for a station. The extant building, a two-storey Second Empire style building with an attached warehouse,. was likely constructed in this period.

Upon completion of the main railway line in 1898, the Reid Newfoundland Company took over the existing railway. It was used as a passenger and freight station.

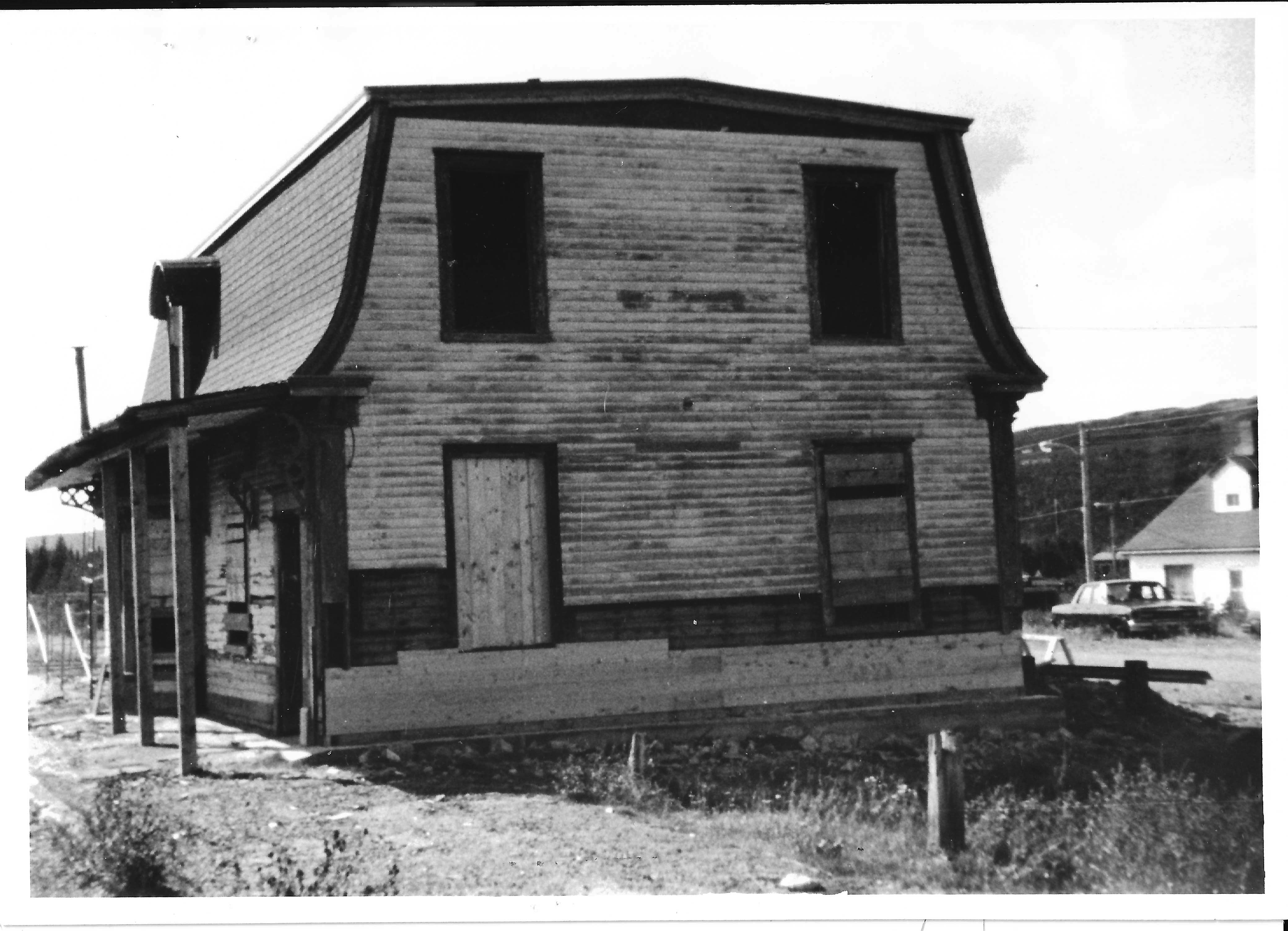
Avondale Railway Station prior to restoration, circa 1988.

In 1923 the Newfoundland Government took over the railway with the 1923 Railway Settlement Act, where the Government acquired the railway, coastal bats, and dry dock from the Reid Newfoundland Company for $2 million. The Avondale Railway Station then became a part of the Newfoundland Railway once again. In 1931 it was finalized for the post offices and telegraph stations to be managed by Newfoundland Railway agents; the Avondale office was taken over on December 15.

The Canadian National Railway took over from the Newfoundland Railway in 1949 when Newfoundland joined the Canadian Confederation. The Avondale Railway Station was managed by CN until 1984. The last train to run in Newfoundland was on September 20, 1988 and less than a month later CN started tearing up the tracks, finishing in 1990 (see: Terra Transport). The rails were sold for scrap and the rolling stock was retired, scrapped, or sold.

Concerned about the potential loss of railway history, the Avondale Heritage Foundation applied to keep a section of their track. They had not received any sort of reply to their application until workers came to tear up the tracks. The people of the community decided they would protest the removal of the tracks, by sitting on them as trucks and bulldozers moved around them. Determination won in the end and the Avondale Railway Station came to an agreement to officially keep a small part of the tracks.

The Avondale railway station was designated a Registered Heritage Structure by the Heritage Foundation of Newfoundland and Labrador in 1988. It was subsequently restored, and received the Manning Award for the “Public Presentation of Historic Places in Newfoundland and Labrador.” As of 2025, it was preserved along with a small display of retired railway cars and a locomotive.

== Demographics ==
In the 2021 Census of Population conducted by Statistics Canada, Avondale had a population of 584 living in 286 of its 346 total private dwellings, a change of −8.9% from its 2016 population of 641. With a land area of 29.69 km^{2} (11.46 sq mi), it had a population density of 19.7/km^{2} (50.9/sq mi) in 2021. Avondale has lost approximately one third of its population since 1976 when it numbered 937 residents.

2016 census
Total Population	641
Population change from 2011	▲0.8%
Median age	47.5
Number of families	190
Number of married couples	135
Total number of dwellings	373
Land Area	29.98 km²

	North: Conception Bay
West: Conception Harbour	Avondale	East: Harbour Main-Chapel's Cove-Lakeview
	South: Subdivision 1O

== See also ==
- List of cities and towns in Newfoundland and Labrador
