= Newfoundland and Labrador Route 3A =

Highway in Newfoundland and Labrador

Route 3A
- Team Gushue Highway

Route information
- Auxiliary route of Route 3
- Maintained by Newfoundland and Labrador Department of Transportation and Infrastructure
- Length: 9.8 km (6.1 mi)
- Existed: June 2006–present

Major junctions
- South end: Route 60 (Topsail Road) on the St. John's-Mount Pearl city line
- Blackmarsh Road in St. John's; Brier Avenue in St. John's; Kenmount Road in St. John's; Goldstone Street to Route 50 in St. John's
- North end: Route 1 (TCH) in St. John's

Location
- Country: Canada
- Province: Newfoundland and Labrador

Highway system
- Highways in Newfoundland and Labrador
← Route 3	→ Route 10

Route 3A, also known as Team Gushue Highway, is a 9.8-kilometre-long (6.1 mi) north-south freeway on the Avalon Peninsula of Newfoundland in the Canadian province of Newfoundland and Labrador. It straddles the line between the provinces two largest cities, the capital city of St. John's and the city of Mount Pearl. It's currently envisioned to run from the Outer Ring Road (Trans-Canada Highway/Route 1) to the interchange between Pitts Memorial Drive (Route 2) and the Goulds Bypass (Route 3). The highway also serves as an alternative to The Parkway.

Although Route 3A is technically an alternate route of Route 3, it is the only alternate route in the province that does not connect to its "parent" route.

== Route description ==
The Team Gushue Highway begins in the northwestern corner of St. John's at exit 45 of the Outer Ring Road (Trans-Canada Highway/Route 1) in a rural wooded area. It heads south through neighbourhoods to pass under Route 50 (Thorburn Road) before having an interchange with Goldstone Street and entering a business district. The highway now has an interchange with Kenmount Road near the Avalon Mall before passing through neighbourhoods again to have interchanges with Brier Avenue and Blackmarsh Road. Team Gushue Highway comes to its temporary southern end shortly thereafter at an interchange with Route 60 (Topsail Road) on the St. John's-Mount Pearl city line.

The Route 3A designation is only signed at the interchange with Route 1 (TCH), with the rest of the highway signed only as Team Gushue Highway.

== History ==
The first part of the highway opened in 2006 from Route 1 to Kenmount Road. In 2018, the second part of the highway from Kenmount Road to Route 60 opened after long time delays.

== Related route ==
Included in phase two of the project was a 1.6-kilometre-long (0.99 mi) spur road known as Brier Avenue. It connects the freeway with the Columbus Drive portion of The Parkway as well as Old Pennywell Road.

Brier Avenue begins at a trumpet interchange with Team Gushue Highway and heads through rural wooded areas as a two-lane road. It now enters neighbourhoods and has an intersection with Old Pennywell Road, where it widens to four-lanes, shortly before coming to an end at an intersection with Columbus Drive.

== Name ==
Team Gushue Highway is named after St. John's native Olympic Curler Brad Gushue when he and his team lead Canada to win a gold medal at the 2006 Winter Olympics. There are special curling stone shields placed on the exit signs for the highway along Route 1.

== Future ==
The highway is ultimately projected to be 7.3-kilometre-long (4.5 mi) and will eventually be extended from Route 60 (Topsail Road) to the interchange between Route 2 (Pitts Memorial Drive) and Route 3 (Goulds Bypass). Extension is to open on October 23, 2026.

== Exit list ==
All exits are unnumbered.

Location	km	mi	Destinations	Notes
St. John's	0.0	0.0	Route 1 (TCH) (Outer Ring Road)	Northern terminus; exit 45 on Route 1
St. John's	1.2	0.75	Goldstone Street to Route 50 (Thorburn Road)	
St. John's	2.3	1.4	Kenmount Road	Partial Cloverleaf. No access to north bound route 3A from east bound Kenmount Road
St. John's	3.2	2.0	Brier Avenue to The Parkway (Columbus Drive)	
St. John's	4.3	2.7	Blackmarsh Road	
St. John's-Mount Pearl city line	6.4	4.0	Route 60 (Topsail Road)	
St. John's-Mount Pearl city line	9.3	5.8	Commonwealth Avenue/Brookfield Road	Roundabout
St. John's-Mount Pearl city line	9.8	6.1	Route 2 (Pitts Memorial Drive); Route 3 south (Heavy Tree Rd / Goulds Bypass / Robert E Howlett Memorial Drive)	Southern terminus; dogbone interchange; continues south as Highway 3
1.000 mi = 1.609 km; 1.000 km = 0.621 mi: Incomplete access; Route transition
