= Newfoundland and Labrador Route 40 =

Highway in Newfoundland and Labrador, Canada

Route 40
- Portugal Cove Road

Route information
- Maintained by Newfoundland and Labrador Department of Transportation and Infrastructure
- Length: 15.3 km (9.5 mi)

Major junctions
- South end: Rennies Mill Road in St. John's
- The Parkway in St. John's; Route 1 (TCH) in St. John's; Route 41 in Portugal Cove-St. Phillips
- North end: Portugal Cove-St. Philips at Bell Island Ferry Terminal

Location
- Country: Canada
- Province: Newfoundland and Labrador

Highway system
- Highways in Newfoundland and Labrador
← Route 30	→ Route 41

Route 40, also known as Portugal Cove Road, is a 15.3-kilometre-long (9.5 mi) north-south highway on the Avalon Peninsula of Newfoundland, extending from St. John's to the town of Portugal Cove-St. Philips in Newfoundland and Labrador, Canada.

Route 40 also serves as the primary access to St. John's International Airport and the Bell Island Ferry terminal.

== Route description ==
Route 40 begins as a two-lane street just north of downtown St. John's at an intersection with Rennies Mill Road. It heads northwest to cross over a brook and pass by neighbourhoods and several parks. The highway passes through a business district at an intersection with Elizabeth Avenue before passing through more neighbourhoods and having a Y-Intersection with New Cove Road. Route 40 now widens to a 4-lane highway as it passes through a business district and has an intersection with The Parkway (Prince Philip Drive/MacDonald Drive). It continues northwest to have a large interchange with Route 1 (Trans Canada Highway, exits 47 A/B) before passing by St. John's International Airport. The highway now narrows to 2-lanes to leave St. John's and pass through rural areas to enter Portugal Cove-St. Phillips. Route 40 winds its west through the Portugal Cove section of the town for several kilometres before coming to an intersection with Route 41 (Beachy Cove Road), where Route 40 turns north on Ferry Terminal Road for a short distance before coming to an end at the Bell Island Ferry terminal.

== Major intersections ==
Location	km	mi	Destinations	Notes
St. John's	0.0	0.0	Rennies Mill Road - Downtown	Southern terminus
St. John's	2.0	1.2	The Parkway (Prince Philip Drive/Macdonald Drive)	
St. John's	3.2– 4.0	2.0– 2.5	Route 1 (TCH) (Outer Ring Road)	Exit 47 A/B on Route 1
St. John's	5.6	3.5	World Parkway - St. John's International Airport	Main access road into airport
Portugal Cove-St. Philips	12.9	8.0	Indian Meal Line (Route 20-16) - Torbay	Route 20-16 Continues To Torbay Road (Old Route 20) Then Continues As Lower Road To Torbay Beach. Next Road After Route 20-16 Is Bauline Line Extension (Route 40-15).
Portugal Cove-St. Philips	15.0	9.3	Route 41 south (Beachy Cove Road) – St. Philips	Northern terminus of Route 41
Portugal Cove-St. Philips	15.3	9.5	Bell Island ferry terminal	Northern terminus
1.000 mi = 1.609 km; 1.000 km = 0.621 mi

== See also ==
- List of Newfoundland and Labrador highways
- List of highways numbered 40
