= Emma Churchill =

- Born: 1862; Portugal Cove, Newfoundland
- Died: 1957; Guelph, Ontario
- Occupation: Salvation Army officer
- Spouse: Charles Dawson

Captain Emma Churchill (1862 – 16 May 1957) was the founder of The Salvation Army in Newfoundland. She was born in Portugal Cove, Newfoundland but moved to Ontario with her parents in 1882. Churchill was in Toronto when two converts from England introduced General William Booth's ideas there. In 1883 she joined The Salvation Army, becoming the 11th of the first 25 Officers to be commissioned in the Army's new Canadian territory. She was the founder of Guelph Salvation Army Corps, having arrived there in 1884 by railway, accompanied by Staff Captain Lt. Ida Russell. When she married Captain Charles Dawson (1864–1942) in 1885, she changed her name to Emma Churchill Dawson.

In 1885, Emma and Charles went to Newfoundland on their honeymoon. On September 3, 1885, at the Methodist church in Portugal Cove, they held the first Salvation Army meeting ever to take place in Newfoundland. Because of the success of this meeting, the YMCA in St. John's asked the Dawsons to hold similar meetings there. This engagement extended their Newfoundland visit to five months. The Dawsons then contacted Canadian Headquarters in January 1886 requesting that officers be assigned to continue conducting the meetings. That same month, four female officers arrived in St. John's.

The Dawsons later returned to Ontario where they established a series of prison ministries through the Toronto's Prison Gate Home, which opened in 1890, and at the Guelph Reformatory.

Emma Dawson died on 16 May 1957 in Guelph, Ontario, and was buried on 18 May 1957 in Woodlawn Cemetery in Guelph.
