= Butter Pot Provincial Park =

Provincial Park in Newfoundland, Canada

Coordinates: 47°23′05″N 53°03′39″W

- IUCN category II (national park)
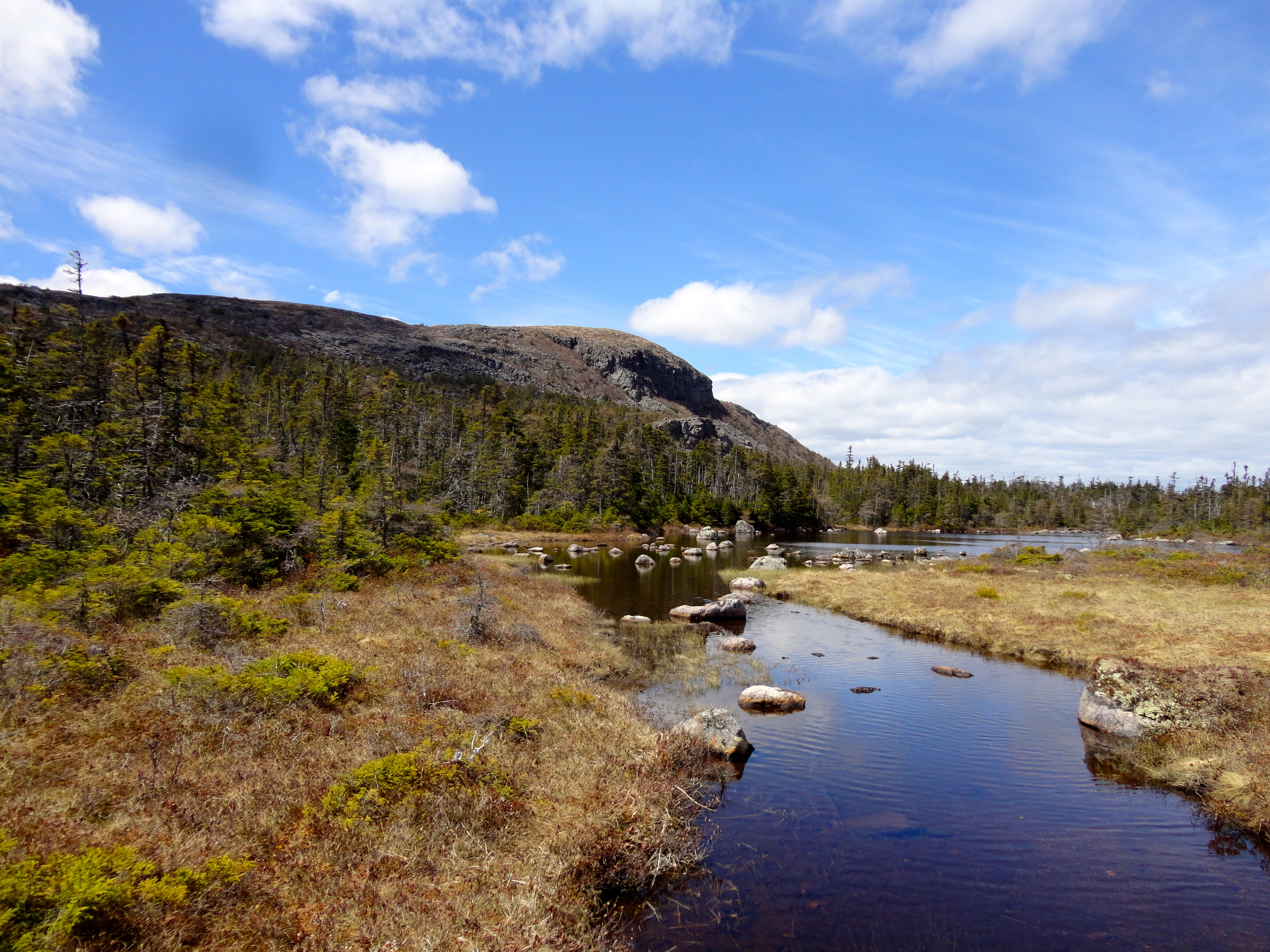
- Butter Pot Hill

- Location within Newfoundland and Labrador
- Location: Avalon Peninsula, Newfoundland and Labrador, Canada
- Nearest city: St. John's
- Area: 28.33 km^{2} (10.94 sq mi)
- Governing body: Parks Division of Newfoundland and Labrador
- Website: https://www.parksnl.ca/parks/butter-pot-provincial-park/

Butter Pot Provincial Park is a Provincial Park on the Avalon Peninsula of the island of Newfoundland, Canada. Covering an of 2,833 hectares (28.33 km^{2}), it is located on the Trans-Canada Highway, about 36 km southwest of St. John's. The park is named for a prominent rounded hill (Butter Pot Hill, 303 m) inside the park boundary. The park is known for its boreal forest and diverse birdlife, attracting hikers, birdwatchers, campers, and winter sports enthusiasts. It offers 175 campsites, multiple trails, and several ponds for swimming, paddling, and fishing. Butter Pot Provincial Park is one of the most visited parks in the Newfoundland provincial park system.

In 2023, Butter Pot became one of the first provincial parks in the province to transition to solar power, replacing diesel generators as part of an effort to reduce greenhouse gas emissions.

== Location ==
The park is located on the Avalon Peninsula in southeastern Newfoundland. It lies in unincorporated land east of Holyrood and south of Conception Bay South, near but outside the boundary of the St. John's Census Metropolitan Area. The park is bordered on the east by the Trans-Canada Highway and can be accessed through several highway exits.

It is located 36 km southwest of the provincial capital, St. John's.

== Description and activities ==
Butter Pot Provincial Park covers an area of 2,833 hectares (28.33 km^{2}). It is a nature reserve featuring varied terrain and vegetation, including forests, bogs, heaths, and numerous ponds (the largest of which is Big Otter Pond). The ponds are open to visitors for swimming, fishing, and paddling.

Hiking trails guide visitors through both wooded areas and open plains, leading to several scenic viewpoints. On the park's western side lies Butter Pot Hill, a prominent rocky hill that gives the park its name and serves as the main lookout point.

Some trails are also accessible to cyclists and are used for cross-country skiing and snowshoeing in winter. The landscape was shaped significantly by glacial activity, which left behind numerous glacial erratics (large boulders composed mostly of quartz and feldspar) scattered along trails.

Campsites are located along both Big Otter Pond and Peter's Pond. In total, the park offers 175 campsites, each equipped with a parking space, picnic table, and fire pit. There are also several playgrounds within the park.

== History ==
A major wildfire in 1889 significantly shaped the park's ecosystem. The fire decimated the plant life in the area and was responsible for the creation of the park's extensive barrens.

In September 2012, the park closed early for the season, as a result of extensive damage to the park roads, trails and facilities caused by Hurricane Leslie.

== Renewable energy ==
In 2023, Butter Pot Provincial Park transitioned from diesel generators to a solar-powered energy system, becoming the third provincial park in Newfoundland and Labrador to do so. Seven buildings in the park now operate using solar-charged battery systems, with propane as a backup energy source. The move was part of a provincial effort to reduce greenhouse gas emissions and was funded in part through the Climate Change Challenge Fund and the Department of Tourism, Culture, Arts and Recreation.

== Fauna ==
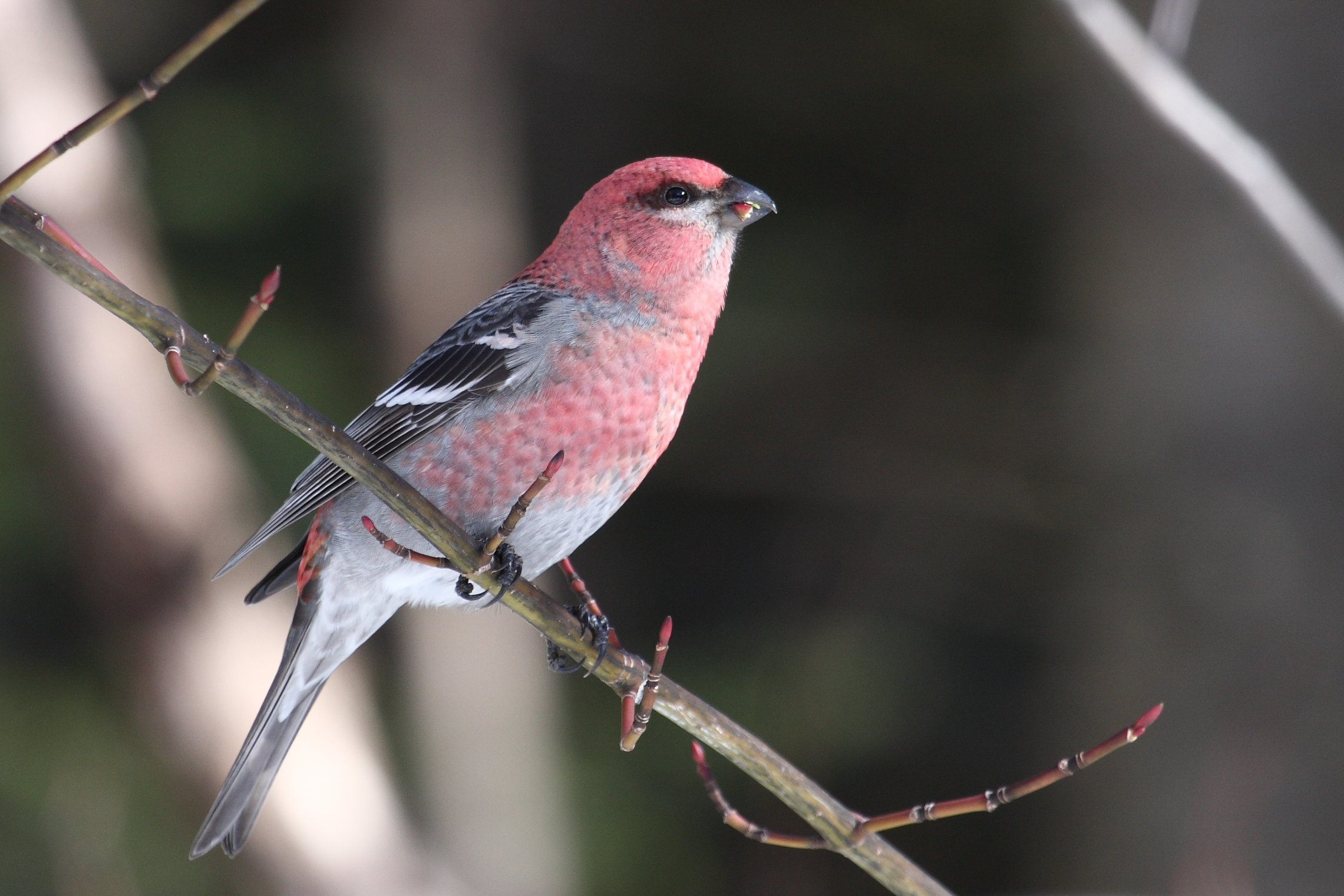
Male pine grosbeak (Pinicola enucleator), a year-round resident of the park

The park is home to over 200 species of birds, making it a popular destination for birdwatchers. Seasonal visitors include species such as the ruby-crowned kinglet, northern waterthrush, hermit thrush, fox sparrow, and yellow-rumped warbler. Year-round residents include the dark-eyed junco, boreal chickadee, and pine grosbeak.

Other wildlife commonly found in the park includes Arctic hares, red squirrels, chipmunks, foxes, moose, beavers, and bats.

== Flora ==
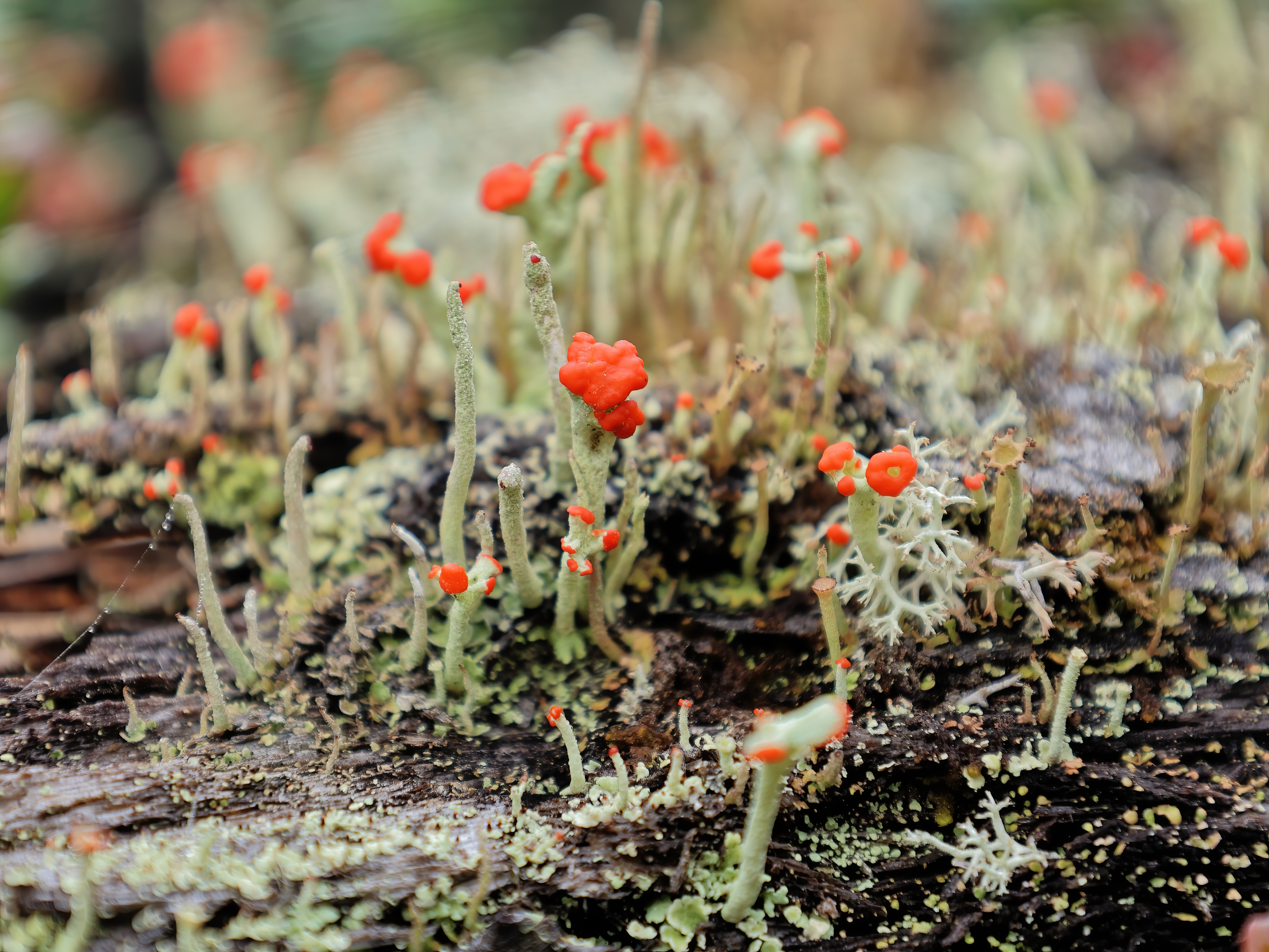
British soldier lichen (Cladonia cristatella), noted for its distinctive red fruiting bodies, is found in the park's lichen-rich areas

The dominant vegetation in the park is boreal forest, primarily composed of black spruce and balsam fir, but it also includes some tamarack and white birch. The forest floor is densely covered in shade-tolerant feathermosses, particularly red-stem moss, broom moss, stair-step moss, and knight's plume moss. These mosses decompose slowly in the park's cold, nutrient-poor conditions, forming thick layers that sequester significant carbon stores in the soil.

In open areas with shallow, acidic soils, various low shrubs and lichens thrive, including Labrador tea, blueberries, rhodora, and sun-tolerant caribou lichens such as green and grey "reindeer" lichens. Bright red "British soldier" lichens are also commonly observed.

== See also ==
- List of Newfoundland and Labrador parks
- List of Canadian provincial parks
- List of National Parks of Canada
