= Tuckamore Youth Treatment Centre =

Coordinates: 47.5341°N 52.8673°W

The Tuckamore Youth Treatment Centre is a residential treatment centre under Eastern Health (now NL Health Services), in the Canadian province of Newfoundland and Labrador. It treats "a dozen youth at a time" aged 12-18 years with "complex mental health issues". Located in Paradise, it is one of the only mental health-focused residential treatment centres in Newfoundland and Labrador that treat youth, with "young people [having] to leave the province for this kind of help" prior to the opening of the Tuckamore Centre and its "sister facility"; as such, it receives youth from all over the province. The average length of stay is "roughly six months to a year".

The Tuckamore Centre's treatment program uses a dialectical behaviour therapy and trauma-informed model of care, as well as practicing therapeutic crisis intervention. Types of counselling include individual, group and family counselling. Other available services include therapeutic recreation, occupational therapy, music therapy, on-site schooling, a physical fitness area, and an apartment for visitors.
