= Newfoundland and Labrador Route 3 =

Highway in Newfoundland and Labrador, Canada

Route 3
- Goulds Bypass Road; Robert E. Howlett Memorial Drive

Route information
- Maintained by Newfoundland and Labrador Department of Transportation and Infrastructure
- Length: 9.7 km (6.0 mi)

Major junctions
- South end: Route 10 in Goulds
- North end: Route 2 on the St. John's-Mount Pearl city line

Location
- Country: Canada
- Province: Newfoundland and Labrador

Highway system
- Highways in Newfoundland and Labrador
← Route 2	→ Route 3A

Route 3, also known as Goulds Bypass Road and Robert E. Howlett Memorial Drive, is a 9.4-kilometre (5.8 mi), two-lane, Partially-controlled access highway in the eastern part of the Avalon Peninsula of Newfoundland in the Canadian province of Newfoundland and Labrador. Its southern terminus is at Route 10 in Goulds, St. John's, and its northern terminus is at Route 2 in St. John's. The route is entirely in Division 1 and generally forms a straight line between its termini.

== Route description ==
Route 3 begins at an intersection with Route 10 (Southern Shore Highway/Irish Loop Drive) in southern Goulds and heads northwest through wooded areas to cross a river via Raymond's Bridge and have an intersection with a gravel road before turning due north. It now passes through farmland as it bypasses Goulds along its west side, where it crosses over a few local roads including Powers Road and Cochrane Pond Road as well as having an intersection with Doyles Road. The highway intersects Ruby Line and comes to an end shortly thereafter at an interchange with Route 2 (Pitts Memorial Drive), continuing north as Commonwealth Avenue into downtown Mount Pearl.

For the majority of its length, Route 3 has a small gravel frontage road giving access to farmland running along its southbound side.

== Future ==
Route 3's northern terminus at Route 2 is also proposed to be the eventual southern terminus of Route 3's "alternate route", Route 3A (Team Gushue Highway).

== Major intersections ==
Location	km	mi	Destinations	Notes
Goulds	0.0	0.0	Route 10 (Southern Shore Highway/Irish Loop Drive) – Goulds, Bay Bulls, Witless Bay	Southern terminus
Goulds	5.3	3.3	Doyles Road - Goulds	
Goulds	8.3	5.2	Ruby Line - Kilbride	
St. John's-Mount Pearl city line	9.7	6.0	Route 2 (Pitts Memorial Drive) to Route 1 (TCH) – St. John's, Conception Bay South; Commonwealth Avenue - Mount Pearl	Northern terminus; interchange; road continues north as Commonwealth Avenue
1.000 mi = 1.609 km; 1.000 km = 0.621 mi
