= Portugal Cove–St. Philip's =

- Town
- Town of Portugal Cove–St. Philip's
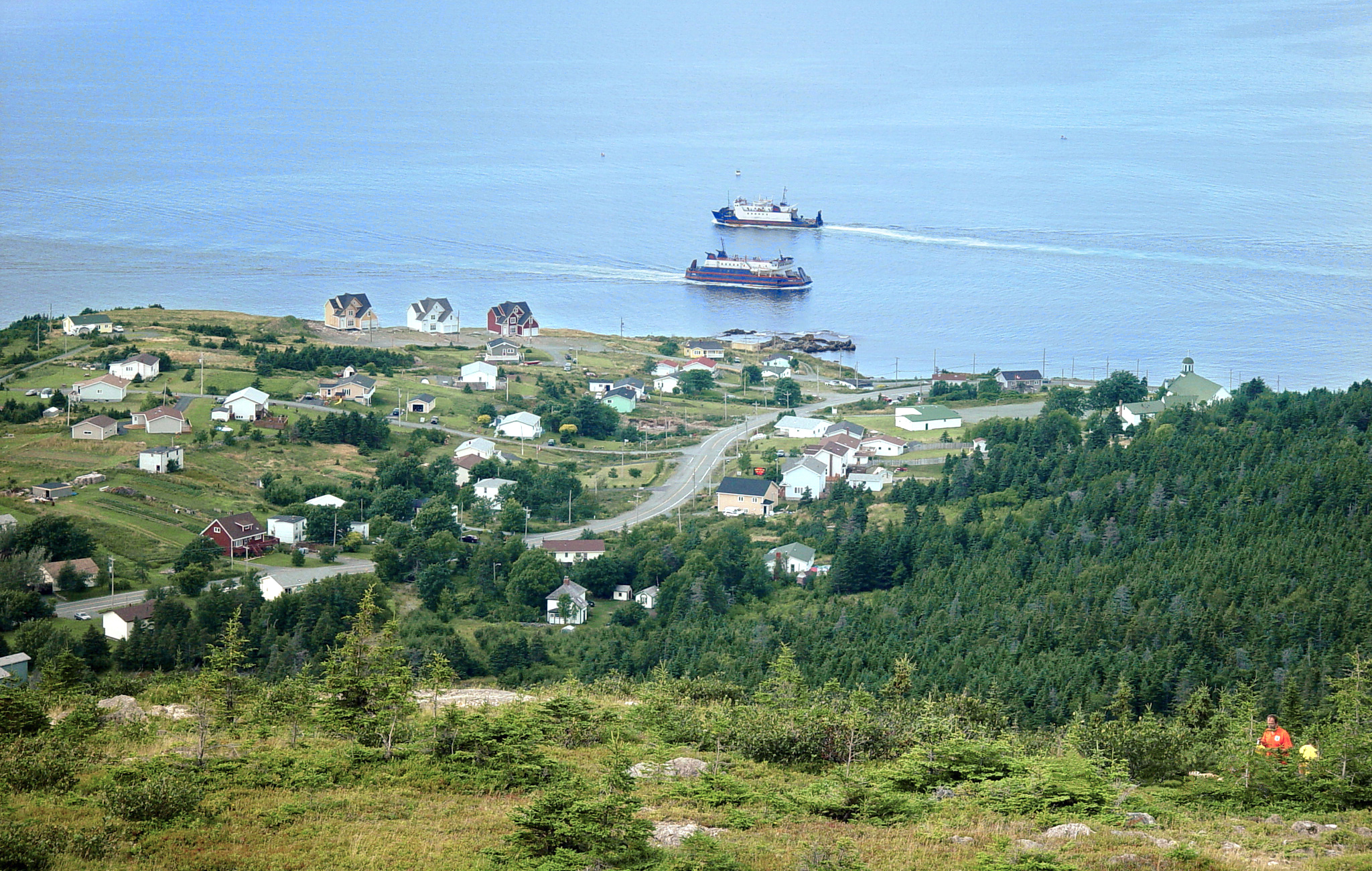
- Portugal Cove, NL showing the two Bell Island ferries. Holy Rosary Church can be seen at the right of the picture.
- Motto: Where the Sun Meets the Sea
- Location of Portugal Cove – St. Philip's in Newfoundland
- Coordinates: 47°37′38″N 52°51′02″W
- Country: Canada
- Province: Newfoundland and Labrador
- Incorporated: 1992

Government
  - Mayor: Dave Bartlett
  - MP: Joanne Thompson (LIB)
  - MHA: Fred Hutton

Population (2021)
  - Total: 8,415
  - Density: 128.4/km^{2} (333/sq mi)
- Time zone: UTC−03:30 (NST)
  - Summer (DST): UTC−02:30 (NDT)
- Area code: 709
- Highways: Route 40; Route 41; Route 50; Bell Island Ferry
- Website: www.pcsp.ca

Portugal Cove–St. Philip's is a rural seashore community located on the eastern Avalon Peninsula of Newfoundland in the province of Newfoundland and Labrador, Canada. The town is a bedroom community of the provincial capital of St. John's.

The provincial government operates a daily ferry service from Portugal Cove–St. Philip's to Bell Island.

== History ==
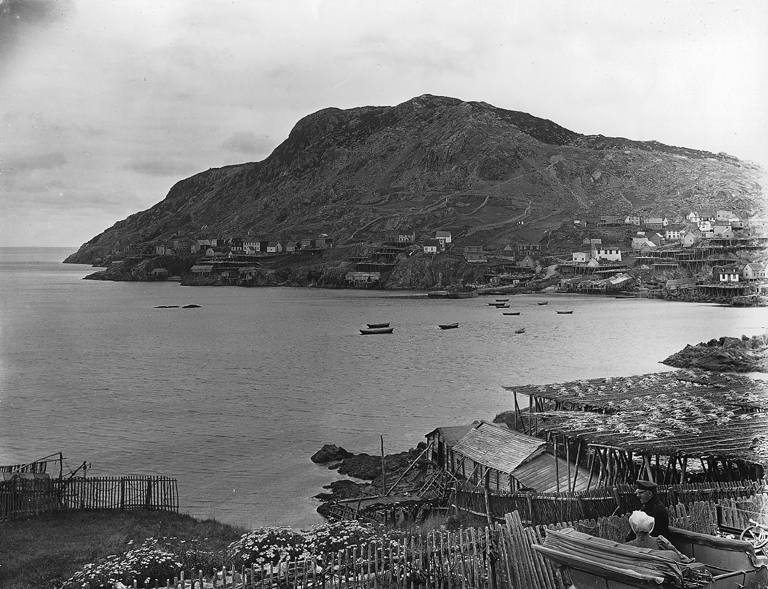
Portugal Cove in 1908

The community is one of the oldest in Newfoundland and has a rich history. It was founded by the Portuguese and was one of the first non Native villages established in the New World by Europeans. The Portugal Cove area has historically been predominantly Roman Catholic. The Roman Catholic population was served by Holy Rosary Church until it closed in 2022.

It was attacked and burned by the French in 1696, was the site of the first road built outside the capital St. John's, it was also here that the giant squid or kraken of legend was discovered and documented. The community has a large body of folklore and oral traditions. Settled by fishermen from the West Country of England and Ireland it also has a small settler tradition from Jersey in the Channel Islands. It is named after Portugal. Fishing had been a mainstay since the 17th century and this has been on the downswing since the 1990s.

== Geography ==
Located less than 15 minutes' drive from the provincial capital of St. John's, and covering 56.43 km^{2} (21.79 sq mi), it borders the City of St. John's to the east, and the Town of Paradise to the west. Located on Conception Bay, it is the site of a ferry terminal which provides daily access to and from Bell Island, and dozens of people commute from this tiny island to work in and around the capital city, daily. The town motto is Where the Sun Meets the Sea.

== Demographics ==
In the 2021 Census of Population conducted by Statistics Canada, Portugal Cove–St. Philip's had a population of 8,415 living in 3,170 of its 3,357 total private dwellings, a change of 3.3% from its 2016 population of 8,147. With a land area of 57.61 km^{2} (22.24 sq mi), it had a population density of 146.1/km^{2} (378.3/sq mi) in 2021.

In 2011, the town’s population has a median age of 39.5 years, which is slightly lower than the provincial median of 40.6 years.

Canada Census Mother Tongue – Portugal Cove–St. Philip's, Newfoundland and Labrador
Census	Total	English			French			English & French			Other		
Year	Responses	Count	Trend	Pop %	Count	Trend	Pop %	Count	Trend	Pop %	Count	Trend	Pop %
2021	8,415	8,245	▲3.2%	98.0%	40	▲14.3%	0.5%	20	▲100.0%	0.2%	95	▲5.6%	1.1%
2016	8,125	7,990	▲10.4%	98.3%	35	0.0%	0.4%	10	0.0%	0.1%	90	▲38.5%	1.1%
2011	7,360	7,240	▲12.2%	98.4%	35	▲16.7%	0.5%	10	▲ n/a%	0.1%	65	▼13.3%	0.9%
2006	6,555	6,450	▲11.4%	98.4%	30	▲200.0%	0.5%	0	▼100.0%	0.0%	75	▲7.1%	1.1%
2001	5,875	5,790	▲1.9%	98.6%	10	▼33.3%	0.2%	10	0.0%	0.2%	70	▲40.0%	1.2%
1996	5,750	5,680	n/a	98.8%	15	n/a	0.3%	10	n/a	0.2%	50	n/a	0.9%

== Notable people ==
- Marlene Creates (artist)
- Emma Churchill (Emma Dawson), founder of The Salvation Army in Newfoundland
- Craig Dobbin, chairman and chief executive officer of CHC Helicopter Corporation
- Andrew Furey, 14th Premier of Newfoundland and Labrador
- Ed Picco, Nunavut MLA
