= Ballyhack, Newfoundland and Labrador =

Human settlement in Newfoundland and Labrador, Canada

Coordinates: 47°26′22″N 53°11′55″W

Ballyhack is a settlement in the Canadian province of Newfoundland and Labrador. It is part of the town of Avondale. It was named after Ballyhack in Ireland.

== See also ==
- List of communities in Newfoundland and Labrador
