= Conception Harbour =

- Town
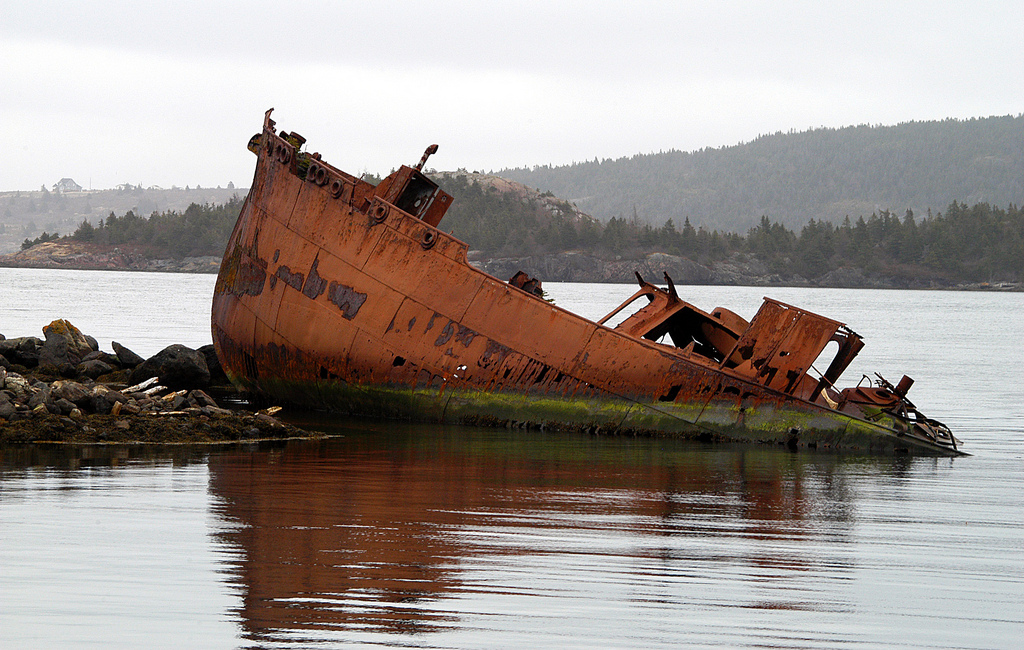

- Location of Conception Harbour in Newfoundland
- Coordinates: 47°26′30″N 53°13′00″W
- Country: Canada
- Province: Newfoundland and Labrador
- Census division: 1

Government
  - Mayor: Judy Trump Rotchford

Area
  - Land: 21.61 km^{2} (8.34 sq mi)

Population (2021)
  - Total: 624
  - Density: 31.7/km^{2} (82/sq mi)
  - Demonym: Conception Harbour
- Time zone: UTC-3:30 (Newfoundland Time)
  - Summer (DST): UTC-2:30 (Newfoundland Daylight)
- Area code: 709
- Highways: Route 60

Conception Harbour is a town on the Avalon Peninsula in Newfoundland and Labrador, Canada. It is in Division 1 on Conception Bay and can be accessed via Newfoundland and Labrador Route 60.

Conception Harbour includes the former communities of Bacon Cove, Cat's Cove, Kitchuses, and Silver Spring. The town has a history of fishing, whaling, ironworking, and tourism as its industries, with ties to the steelworking construction industry in mid-20th-century New York City. In 2022, cephalopod fossils were found in Bacon Cove that potentially moved their evolutionary date back by 30 million years.

== History ==
Prior to 1870, the settlement in the area was known as Cat's Cove. Conception Harbour was incorporated as a community in 1972. Throughout its history, the village's economy primarily focused around fishing, with a protected harbour nearby, and a lobster factory existed there in the early 1900s. Due to the decline of cod in the area, fishermen traveled to the northeastern United States (primarily Boston and New York City) for work. In New York City, the immigrants (mostly from Kitchuses and Bacon Cove) became known as "fish" who worked as ironworkers in groups of seven, and some of their families followed. Strong ties back to Newfoundland led to the rise of ironworkers in the area, and the town's first ironworkers union was chartered in 1955.

Due to the decline of the whaling industry, several whalers were brought to the town to be scuttled in 1959. In 1968, the S.S. Charcot ran aground near the town, leading to the discovery of several wrecks of the scuttled ships, whose parts would continue to wash up onto the beach throughout the next several decades. In 2013, the Shipwreck Preservation Society of Newfoundland and Labrador, the town, and the region's Economic Development Board partnered to improve the shipwrecks' tourism facilities. Oil from one wreck's fuel tank had been leaking (with oil sheen visible in the summers), and in 2020, the Canadian Coast Guard drained the tank, a difficult task due to the novelty of the operation, the thickness of the tank's steel, and the viscosity of the oil. Over 14,000 liters were removed.

In 2022, cephalopod fossils were found in Bacon Cove in a 522 million year old layer of rock by Heidelberg University researchers Anne Hildenbrand and Gregor Austermann; the fossils potentially backdated the origin of cephalopods by 30 million years to the early Cambrian period, when multicellular organisms first developed.

== Economy, culture, and landmarks ==
Industry in the area includes ironworking, fishing, and tourism.

The town's St. Anne's Roman Catholic Parish Church was built in 1904, replacing a church built between 1857 and 1861.

== Demographics ==
In the 2021 Census of Population conducted by Statistics Canada, Conception Harbour had a population of 624 living in 280 of its 330 total private dwellings, a change of −8.9% from its 2016 population of 685. With a land area of 21.47 km^{2} (8.29 sq mi), it had a population density of 29.1/km^{2} (75.3/sq mi) in 2021.

=== Absorbed communities ===
Bacon Cove, a fishing and farming settlement south east of Bay Roberts, had a population of 124 in 2012. Kitchuses had a population of 169 in 1940 and 131 in 1956.

== Transportation ==
Newfoundland and Labrador Route 60 runs nearby.

== See also ==
- List of cities and towns in Newfoundland and Labrador
