= James S. Pitts =

Newfoundland businessman and politician (1847–1914)

The Honourable James S. Pitts CMG MLC
- Pitts in 1894

Minister without portfolio
- In office 1899–1908
- Prime Minister: James S. Winter; Robert Bond
- In office April 1894 – December 1894
- Premier: Augustus F. Goodridge
- In office 1888–1889
- Premier: Robert Thorburn

Member of the Legislative Council of Newfoundland
- In office February 6, 1883 – January 27, 1914
- Nominated by: William Whiteway
- Appointed by: John Hawley Glover
- Succeeded by: Richard Squires

Personal details
- Born: James Stewart Pitts; November 14, 1847 St. John's, Newfoundland Colony
- Died: January 27, 1914 (aged 66) St. John's, Newfoundland
- Party: Conservative (1883–1885; 1889–1900); Reform (1885–1889); Liberal (1900–1914)
- Spouse: Mary Mackay
- Occupation: Businessman

James Stewart Pitts (November 14, 1847 – January 27, 1914) was a Newfoundland businessman and politician who served as a member of the Legislative Council from 1883 to 1914. A prominent commission merchant, Pitts served as a minister without portfolio in several administrations. His estate was largely dedicated to public works projects, and he is the namesake of Pitts Memorial Drive in St. John's.

== Early life and business career ==
Pitts was born on November 14, 1847, in St. John's to William Pitts, a local merchant, and Ann Pitts (née Cocheran) of Kingskerswell, Devon, England. After attending the local schools in St. John's and graduating in 1865, Pitts joined his father's firm as a commission merchant and greatly expanded the family enterprise. He was the proprietor of Albert Soap Works, which made soaps from fish oil, and he also had business interests in the Boot and Shoe Company, the Canada and Newfoundland Steamship Company, and Victoria Tobacco Works. Pitts' business premises suffered great damage in the Great Fire of 1892. In addition to his other shares, Pitts was a member of the board of directors for the Commercial Bank, and he was the president of the Methodist College's board of governors from 1900 onwards.

== Politics ==
Although his father had supported Charles Fox Bennett's Anti-Confederation Party, Pitts aligned himself with the opposing Conservative parties. He was nominated to the Legislative Council, the colony's upper house, by premier William Whiteway on February 6, 1883. Some years later in 1888, Whiteway's successor Robert Thorburn appointed Pitts to the Executive Council as a minister without portfolio. He resigned from the legislature after he was sued along with the other directors of the Commercial Bank following the 1894 Newfoundland bank crash, but he was acquitted in 1897 and was re-appointed to cabinet in 1899 by premier James S. Winter. Pitts switched his allegiance to the Liberal Party led by Robert Bond following the collapse of the Winter administration over their contract with the Reid Newfoundland Company, a move which allowed him to retain his cabinet seat. He was made a Commander of the Order of St Michael and St George by King Edward VII in 1906.

== Death and legacy ==
Pitts died in St. John's on January 27, 1914. Following his death, his widow Mary Pitts (née Mackay) devoted a large portion of his estate to the erection of an auditorium called Pitts Memorial Hall. Although the building no longer survives, its name was given to Pitts Memorial Drive by the St. John's City Council in 1984.
