= Holyrood, Newfoundland and Labrador =

Holyrood Hollyrode
- Town
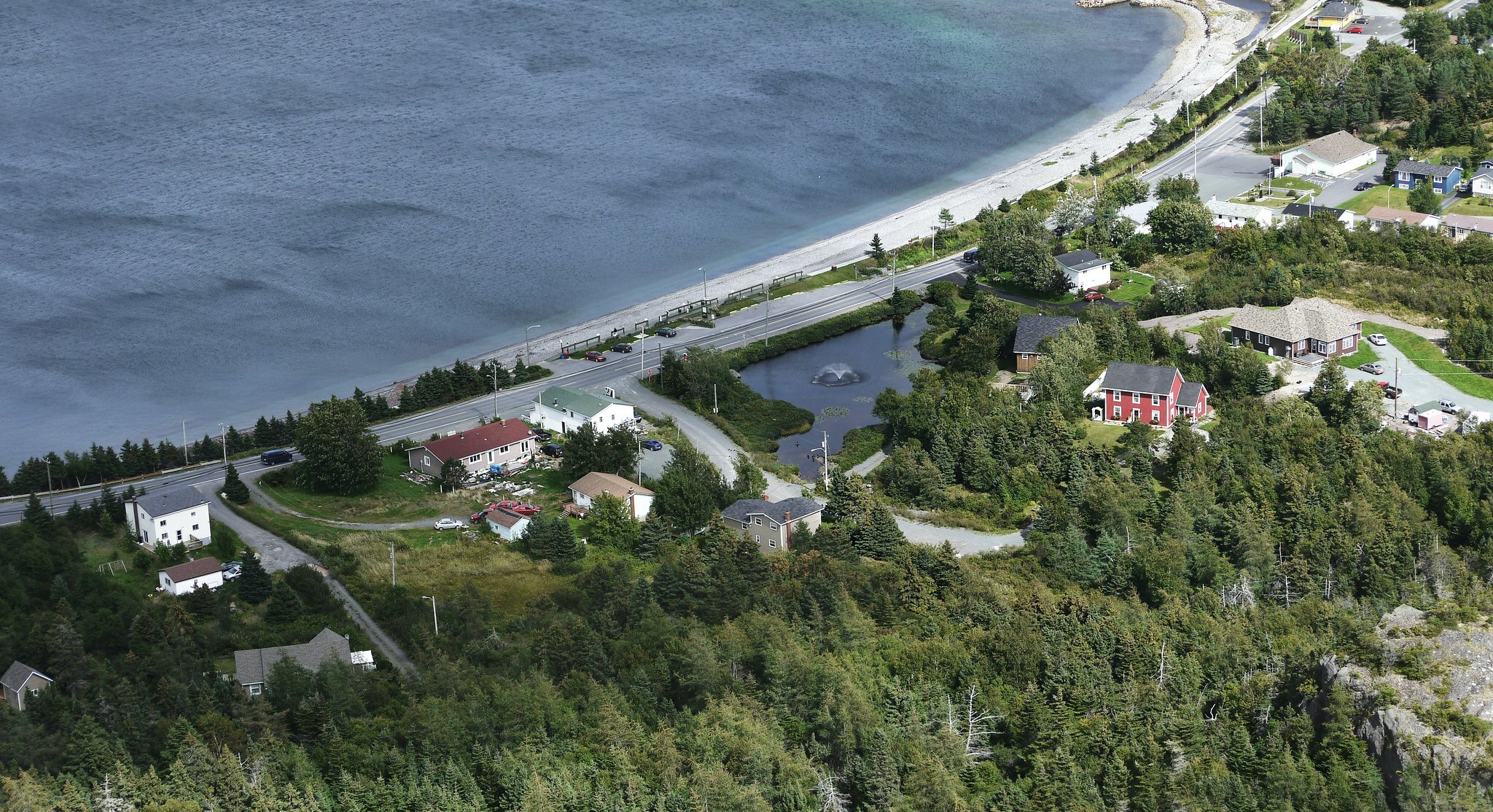

- Seal

- Location of Holyrood in Newfoundland
- Coordinates: 47°23′N 53°08′W
- Country: Canada
- Province: Newfoundland and Labrador
- Census division: 1
- Settled: 1689
- Incorporated: 1961

Area
  - Total: 125.57 km^{2} (48.48 sq mi)

Population (2021)
  - Total: 2,471
  - Density: 19.68/km^{2} (50.97/sq mi)
- Time zone: UTC−03:30 (Newfoundland Time)
  - Summer (DST): UTC−02:30 (Newfoundland Daylight)
- Area code: 709
- Highways: Route 1 (TCH); Route 60; Route 62; Route 90
- Website: http://holyrood.ca/

Holyrood is a town on the Avalon Peninsula in Newfoundland and Labrador, Canada. It is in Division 1, on Conception Bay. It is approximately a 30-minute drive from the capital city of St. John's. During King William's War, the village was destroyed in the Avalon Peninsula Campaign.

The town is famous for being at the bottom of the bay and having a large cross on the top of the predominant mountain "George Cove". Holyrood is also renowned for its squid fishery and caplin "rolling" which happens in late spring, early summer. "Rolling" refers to the mating of the caplin when they beach themselves and can be picked up by hand. It also hosts the popular "Squid Fest," several days of squid-themed activities culminating in an outdoor festival of drinking and traditional music. The festival attracts thousands of locals and tourists each year.

The town has a population of 2,471 (as of 2021). Since 2021, Holyrood has been considered part of the St. John's metropolitan area.

== Demographics ==
In the 2021 Census of Population conducted by Statistics Canada, Holyrood had a population of 2,471 living in 993 of its 1,089 total private dwellings, a change of 0.3% from its 2016 population of 2,463. With a land area of 126.02 km^{2} (48.66 sq mi), it had a population density of 19.6/km^{2} (50.8/sq mi) in 2021.

== Services ==
Holyrood contains an elementary school, Holy Cross Elementary (kindergarten and grades 1 to 6). After completing grade 6, students attend Roncalli Central High in Avondale.

== Notable people ==
- Kate Corbett, actress
- Philip J. Lewis (1900–1985), was a lawyer and politician in Newfoundland

== See also ==
- List of cities and towns in Newfoundland and Labrador
- Holyrood weather radar
- Monarchy in Newfoundland and Labrador
