= Kenmount Road =

Road in St. John's, Newfoundland and Labrador

Coordinates: 47.5485°N 52.7829°W

Kenmount Road is a major road in St. John's, Newfoundland and Labrador. It begins at the intersection of Freshwater Road and Thorburn Road, just east of the Columbus Drive overpass. Originally passing through rural farmland, Kenmount Road is now a significant commercial area, with the Avalon Mall at its eastern end, followed by a series of car dealerships, restaurants, hotels, and other businesses. At its western end, Kenmount Road intersects Topsail Road and the Trans-Canada Highway, and has been extended into the Town of Paradise, where it runs into another road, McNamara Drive.

O'Leary Industrial Park is located just north of Kenmount Road, with access via Pippy Place and Peet Street. Further west, past the intersection with the Team Gushue Highway, lies the Kelsey Drive big-box retail area. West of Kelsey Drive, the new Kenmount Terrace subdivision is currently under development. In the 2022 provincial budget it was announced that a school would be constructed in Kenmount Terrace, a first for the area.

The Trans-Canada Highway originally continued down Kenmount Road, prior to the construction of the Outer Ring Road in the 1990s, which diverted the highway onto a new alignment across the north of the city.

The overpass that carries Kenmount Road (originally the Trans-Canada Highway) over Topsail Road holds a special place in the province. One of the first highway interchanges constructed in the province, it has come to represent the boundary between the St. John's urban region and the remainder of the island. The phrase "beyond the overpass" is commonly used to refer collectively to all areas of Newfoundland that lie outside the boundaries of metro St. John's.

== See also ==
- List of Newfoundland and Labrador highways
