= Harbour Main-Chapel's Cove-Lakeview =

- Town
- Location of Harbour Main-Chapel's Cove-Lakeview in Newfoundland
- Coordinates: 47°26′01.29″N 53°8′45.01″W
- Country: Canada
- Province: Newfoundland and Labrador
- Census division: 1

Area
  - Total: 21.05 km^{2} (8.13 sq mi)

Population (2021)
  - Total: 1,065
  - Density: 50.6/km^{2} (131/sq mi)
- Time zone: UTC-3:30 (Newfoundland Time)
  - Summer (DST): UTC-2:30 (Newfoundland Daylight)
- Area code: 709
- Highways: Route 60
- Website: townofharbourmainchapelscovelakeview.ca

Harbour Main-Chapel's Cove-Lakeview is a town on the Avalon Peninsula in Newfoundland and Labrador, Canada. It is in Division 1, on Conception Bay. During King William's War, the village was destroyed in the Avalon Peninsula Campaign.

== Demographics ==
In the 2021 Census of Population conducted by Statistics Canada, Harbour Main-Chapel's Cove-Lakeview had a population of 1,065 living in 467 of its 530 total private dwellings, a change of −0.2% from its 2016 population of 1,067. With a land area of 21.19 km^{2} (8.18 sq mi), it had a population density of 50.3/km^{2} (130.2/sq mi) in 2021.

== See also ==
- List of cities and towns in Newfoundland and Labrador
