= Paradise, Newfoundland and Labrador =

Town in Newfoundland and Labrador, Canada

Paradise
- Town
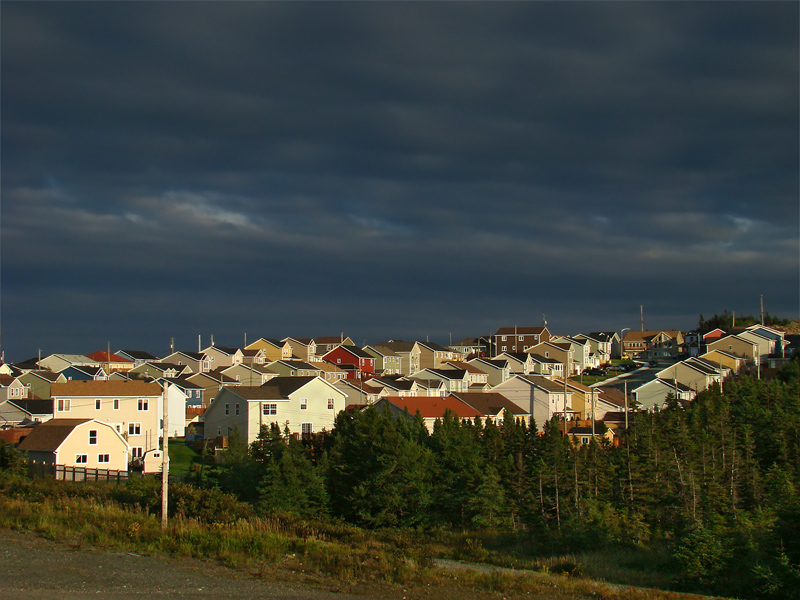
- At sunset

- Flag Seal Logo

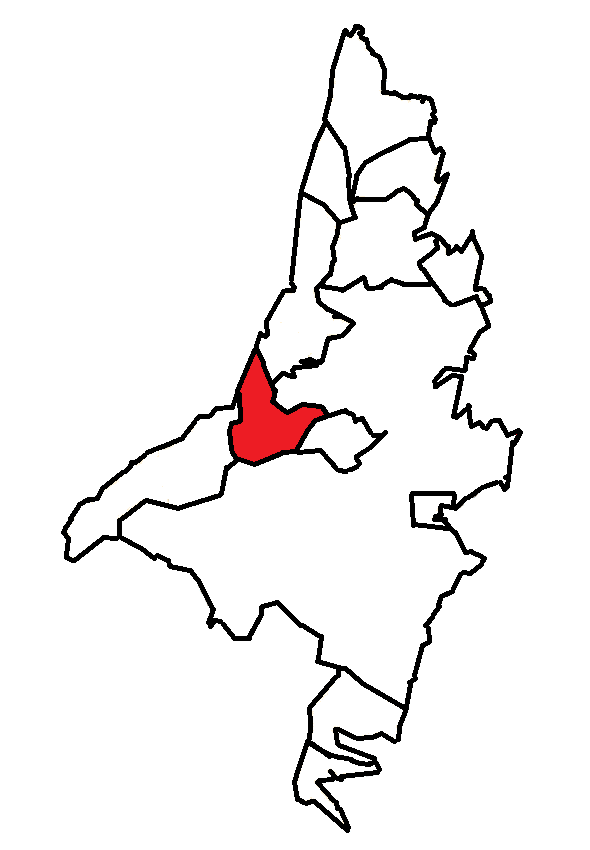
- Location of Paradise (red) in the St. John's Metropolitan Area.

- Location of Paradise in Newfoundland
- Coordinates: 47°32′N 52°52′W
- Country: Canada
- Province: Newfoundland
- Settled: late 19th century

Government
  - Mayor: Patrick Martin
  - MHA: Fred Hutton (LIB); Paul Dinn (PC); Sarah Stoodley (LIB)
  - MP: Tom Osborne (LIB)

Area
  - Total: 29.24 km^{2} (11.29 sq mi)

Population (2021)
  - Total: 22,957
  - Density: 785.1/km^{2} (2,033/sq mi)
- Time zone: UTC-3:30 (Newfoundland Time)
  - Summer (DST): UTC-2:30 (Newfoundland Daylight)
- Area code: 709
- Highways: Route 1 (TCH); Route 2 Route 50; Route 60; Kenmount Road
- Website: Town of Paradise

Paradise is a town on the Avalon Peninsula in the province of Newfoundland and Labrador, Canada. Paradise is the third largest settlement in the province and is part of the St. John's metropolitan area, the 20th largest metropolitan area in Canada.

== History ==
While parts of Paradise have been inhabited since the late nineteenth century, mainly as farmland, its growth only took off in the 1830s and 1870s as a "bedroom community" of nearby St. John's. It grew at a slow pace until the early 1990s, when the Town of Paradise was amalgamated with the Town of St. Thomas. Other developed areas which had previously been administered by the Southern Metropolitan Board--an agency of the Government of Newfoundland and Labrador--were also amalgamated with Paradise. These areas are Three Island Pond, Topsail Pond, Elizabeth Park, and Evergreen Village.

=== Octagon Castle ===
Operating from 1896 to 1915, the Octagon Castle was a four-story, eight-sided hotel resort, named by its creator, "Professor" Charles Henry Danielle. Destroyed by fire in 1915, its name survives in the nearby Octagon Pond. In 2022, a blue sculptural artwork inspired by Octagon Castle was installed at the centre of a Paradise roundabout.

== Geography ==
Precambrian bedrock underlies the town, with a belt of volcanic rock along the coast and clastic sedimentary rock inland. The soil is for the most part a stony loam podzol mapped as Cochrane series. Peat is common in poorly drained areas.

== Demographics ==
In the 2021 Census of Population conducted by Statistics Canada, Paradise had a population of 22,957 living in 8,813 of its 9,331 total private dwellings, a change of 7.3% from its 2016 population of 21,389. With a land area of 29.67 km^{2} (11.46 sq mi), it had a population density of 773.7/km^{2} (2,004.0/sq mi) in 2021. Based on the 2016 Census, the median income for the Town of Paradise was $107,542 before taxes and a median income of $89,037 after taxes.

== Sports ==
Paradise is the starting point for the annual Tely 10 Mile Road Race, one of the oldest races in Canada. Paradise hosted the Toronto Maple Leafs at its Paradise Double Ice Complex in September 2019 when the NHL club opened their 2019-2020 training camp in the town. In December 2019, Paradise hosted the 2019 Para Hockey Cup at its Paradise Double Ice Complex, which saw teams from Canada, The United States of America, Russia, and the Czech Republic participating in the event.

== Government ==
The Paradise town council is made up of a mayor, deputy mayor, and five councillors. The current mayor of the town is Kimberly Street who is filling in the position as former mayor Dan Bobbett resigned September 10, 2025. Patrick Martin, a long time town councilor was named mayor-elect on October 2, 2025 after narrowly defeating fellow councilor, Larry Vaters in the 2025 municipal election.

Paradise is part of three provincial electoral districts; Conception Bay East – Bell Island, represented by Fred Hutton, and Topsail-Paradise, which is represented by Paul Dinn. Sarah Stoodley, the MHA for Mount Scio, also represents the Elizabeth Park subdivision in Paradise, near the Mount Pearl border.

The town is represented in Parliament by one MP, Tom Osborne, MP for Cape Spear.

Paradise federal election results
Year	Liberal		Conservative		New Democratic		Green	
2021	47%	4,131	31%	2,706	21%	1,816	0%	0
2019	39%	4,009	26%	2,701	31%	3,217	3%	333

Paradise provincial election results
Year	Liberal		PC		New Democratic	
2019	33%	2,132	59%	3,817	2%	124
2015	39%	2,474	51%	3,235	10%	631

=== 2009 mayoral election controversy ===
On September 29, 2009, Newfoundland and Labrador held municipal elections in its municipalities. Paradise had two people running for mayor – incumbent Ralph Wiseman and 19-year-old Kurtis Coombs.

On September 30, it was announced that Coombs had won the election, making him the youngest mayor in Canada. He had beat Wiseman by three votes, having 1,821 votes compared to Wiseman's 1,818. However, a recount revealed that the two were tied. Under Newfoundland and Labrador's Municipal Elections Act, a draw is used to determine the winner if a recount results in a tie. Wiseman was announced the mayor when a piece of paper with his name was drawn out of a recycle bin that contained both his name and Coombs'. Coombs planned on requesting a judicial recount and recommended that another election be held.

On October 6, a judge ordered that the results be recounted again, which took place on October 13. The following day it was announced that the recount resulted in another tie. Joyce Moss, the town's chief returning officer, stated that the result from the random draw will stand, resulting in Wiseman remaining as the town's mayor.

=== Mayors ===
The current mayor is Patrick Martin, first elected in 2025.

- Bill Lewis (1985-1986)
- Dianne Whelan (1986–2003)
- Fred W. Brown (2003–2005)
- Ralph Wiseman (2005–2013)
- Dan Bobbett (2013–2025)
- Kimberly Street (2025)
- Patrick Martin (2025-present)

== Infrastructure ==
Tuckamore Youth Treatment Centre is a residential treatment centre located in Paradise.

== Notable people ==
- Sarah Davis, women's hockey player
- Carl English, professional basketball player
- Nicole Williams English, model and fashion designer

== See also ==
- List of cities and towns in Newfoundland and Labrador
