= East Coast Trail =

Long-distance footpath in Newfoundland and Labrador, Canada

- Length: 336 km (209 mi)
- Location: Newfoundland, Canada
- Trailheads: Near St. John's; Cappahayden
- Use: Hiking
- Difficulty: Easy to strenuous
- Season: Year-round

The East Coast Trail (ECT) is a long-distance coastal footpath located in the Canadian province of Newfoundland and Labrador. It is a developed trail over 336 kilometres (209 mi) long, the creation of which began in 1994. It is made up of 25 linked wilderness paths and passes through more than 30 communities. It was named one of the best adventure destinations by National Geographic in 2012 and is extended and improved yearly.

Maintained by the East Coast Trail Association and located primarily on public lands, the trail follows the east coast of Newfoundland, along the Atlantic Ocean. The path passes through many small coastal outports (villages) in the bays of the Avalon Peninsula. It runs from Topsail Beach, north to Cape St. Francis, then south through St. John's, and continues south as far as Cappahayden. It is intended that the trail will eventually be extended to Trepassey in the south and across to Placentia in the west (from Ferryland).

The trail also passes several National historic sites, including Signal Hill, St. John's, Cape Spear (the easternmost point in North America, not including Greenland), and Ferryland, the site of the 17th-century Colony of Avalon. It also passes through La Manche and Chance Cove Provincial Parks. There are seasonal views of icebergs, birds, whales, other marine and plant life, and eight historic lighthouses along the path. The individual sections of the trail range in hiking time from a few hours to a full day. There are some designated camping spots along the trail, though most walkers use local accommodation.

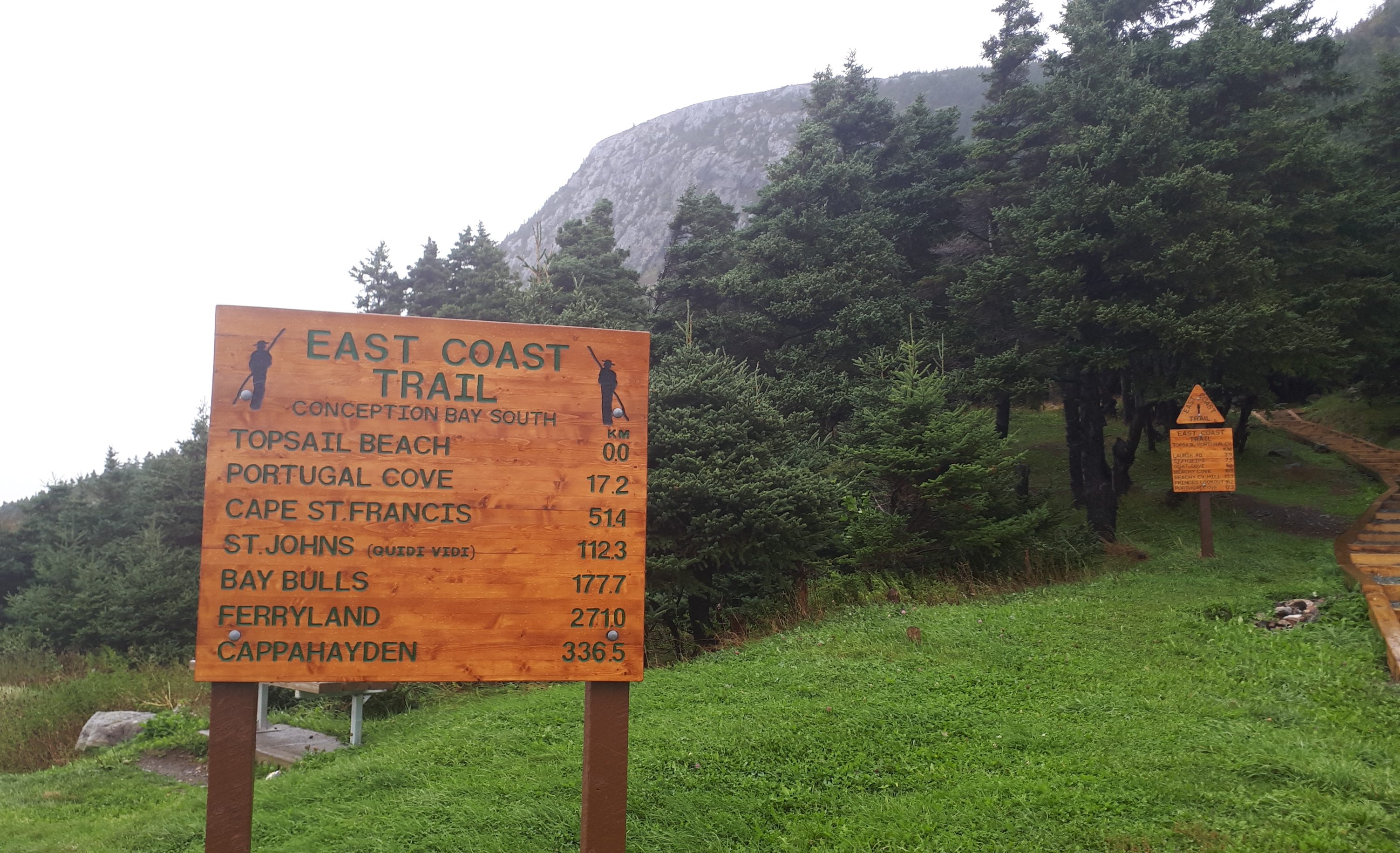
The start of the East Coast Trail at the Topsail Beach, Conception Bay South

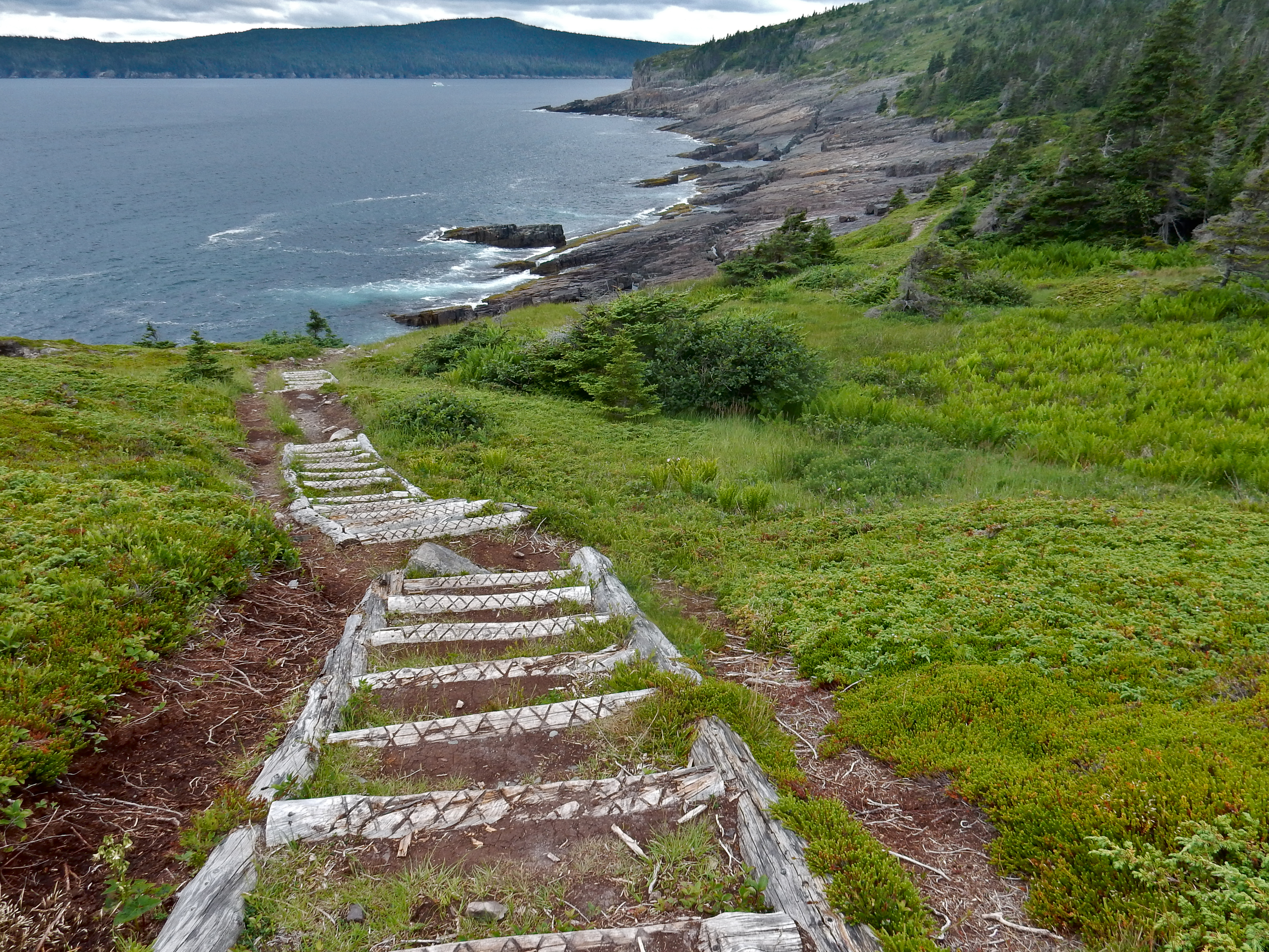
Typical section of the East Coast Trail, near Bay Bulls

== History ==
The Trail officially began in 1994 "when a group of hiking enthusiasts started the construction of a coastal trail" that would make use of existing traditional trails that linked local communities along the coast of the Avalon Peninsula. By the end of 1994, the volunteers had constructed the first 25 km of the trail, north and south of St. John's. The following year the East Coast Trail Association was incorporated and it was subsequently registered as a charity. By 1996, the Trail had grown to 125 km and had reached and restored "The Spout", a natural geyser and major attraction at the centre of the Trail. The initial plan "was to build and maintain" a long distance coastal footpath from Topsail Beach to Trepassey and in 1997 the Association obtained funds from the Federal Government to develop this 220 km trail.

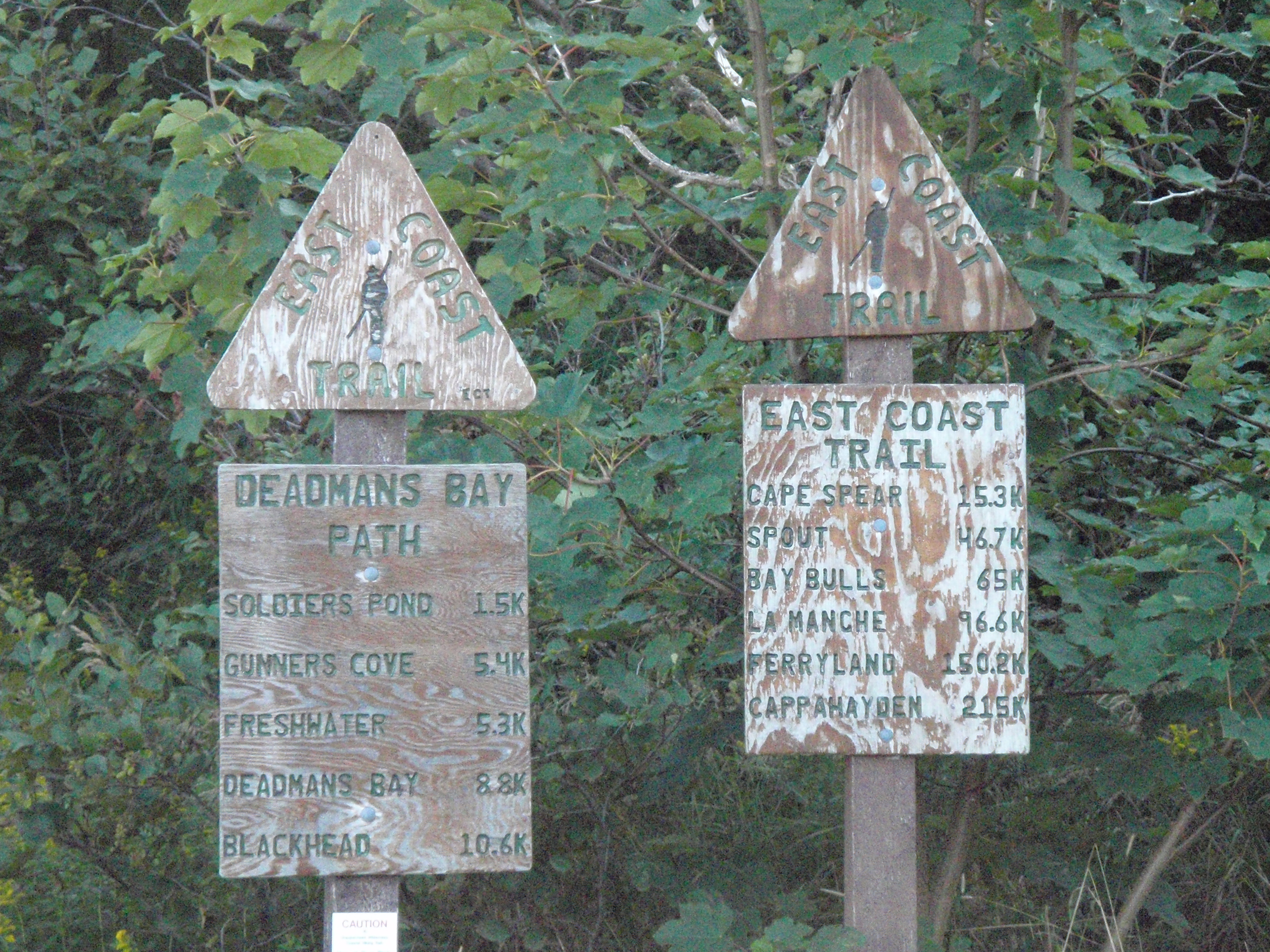
Start of early section of the trail to open at Fort Amherst, St. John's.

In September 2001, 212 km of the trail was officially opened from Fort Amherst in St. John's to Cappahayden in the south and the East Coast Trail Association had grown to 700 members. Subsequently, the route was extended north from St. John's. The last section between Topsail Beach and Portugal Cove was opened with upgraded trails and signage in 2020.

The final goal is "540 km of coastal and inland trail", which will include the completion of the trail between Capperhayden and Treppassey, and side trails from Ferryland, namely the 90 kilometres D'Iberville Trail, crossing the Avalon Wilderness Reserve from Ferryland to Placentia, connecting Lord Baltimore's Colony of Avalon to Castle Hill, Placentia and the 30 kilometres Masterless Men Path, an inland route stretching all the way to the Butterpot, linking Ferryland and Renews.

The D'Iberville Trail is named after the French explorer and soldier Pierre Le Moyne d'Iberville. The Masterless Men trail takes its name from "a legendary outlaw society (fl late 18th, early 19th centuries ... [of] men escaping press gangs, Royal Navy deserters and runaway indentured servants from Newfoundland fishing plantations who fled inland to escape their harsh life. ... said to have inhabited the wild Butter Pot barrens of the Avalon Peninsula".

== Route ==
The 25 paths of the East Coast Trail are broken down into three main sections: North of St. John's; St. John's to La Manche and the southern end from La Manche to Cappahayden. All timings below are for a one-way hike.

=== Topsail Beach to St John's ===
The northern end of the trail follows the south coast of Conception Bay as far as Cape St. Francis and then turns south. Although the paths on the northern end are close to St. John's and its suburbs, they traverse wilderness clifftop plateaus and involve many steep climbs, some requiring the use of fixed ropes.

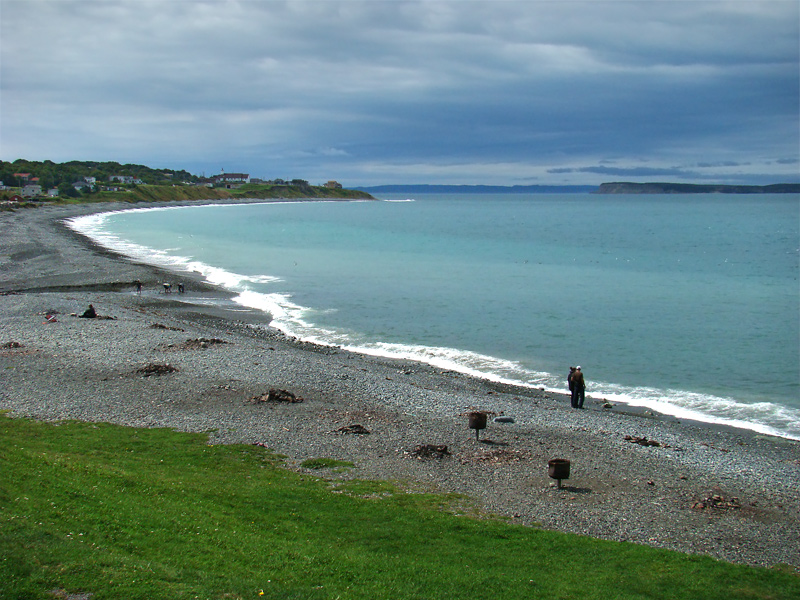
Topsail Beach, where the trail now begins

Long Shore Path (Topsail Beach - Portugal Cove) A 17.2-kilometre (10.7 mi) moderate to difficult path that takes 6 to 8 hours. This path has been opened and is scheduled for completion by August 2020. It passes through St. Thomas, St. Philips, and Beachy Cove. Regular ferry service to Bell Island from Portugal Cove.

Piccos Ridge Path (Portugal Cove - Bauline) A 14.5-kilometre (9.0 mi) strenuous hike on high, open ground, of 7–8 hours. This path is considered undeveloped with minimal structures. The path has been cut and signed. There are long stretches of exposed trail so caution is advised. Exercise caution in all areas, especially on the steep north slope of Black Cliff.

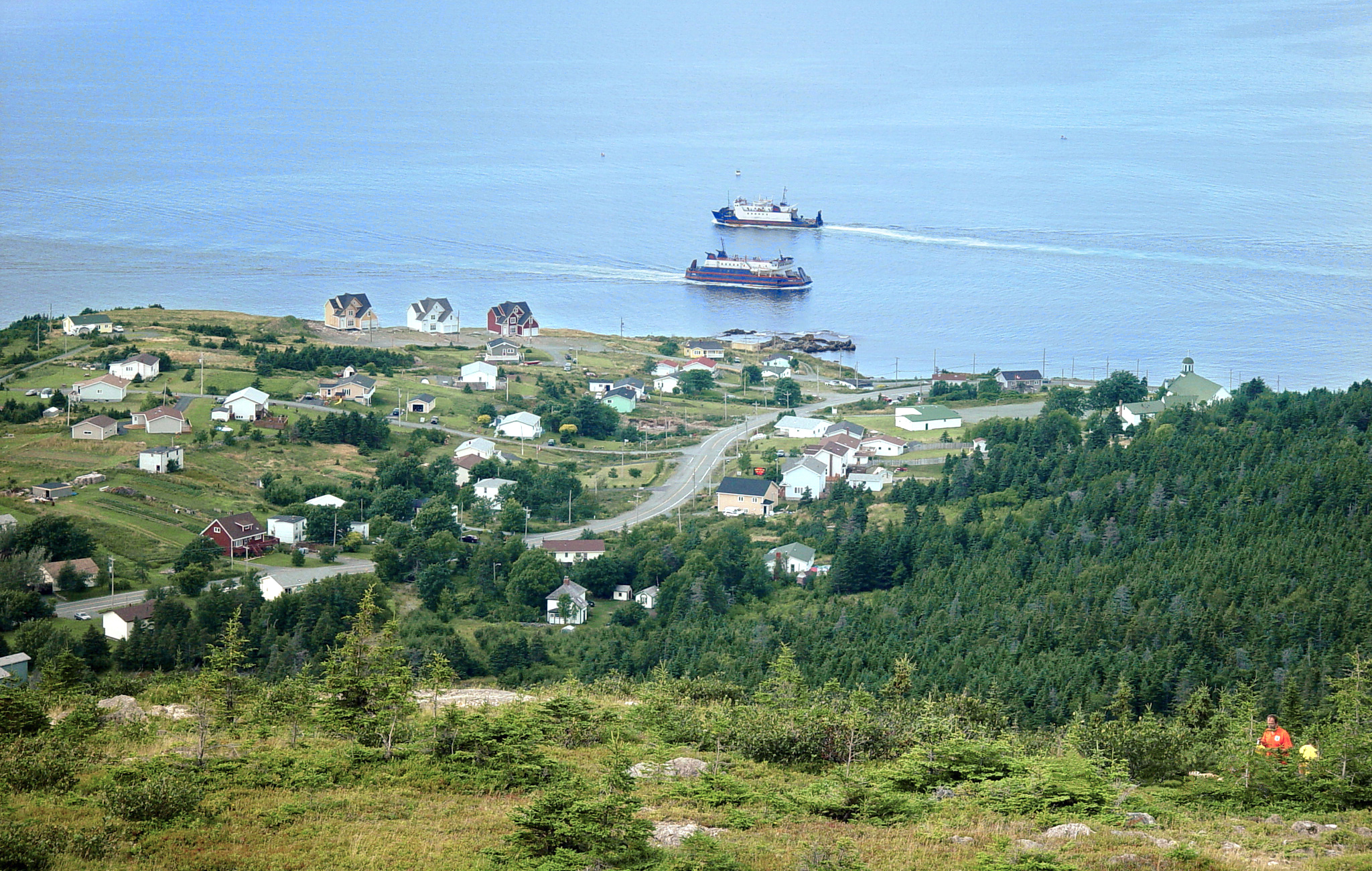
Portugal Cove, NL, Bell Island ferries

White Horse Path 18.2 km (Bauline - Cape St. Francis) A 17.5-kilometre (10.9 mi) strenuous hike, 8–10 hours. This is still an undeveloped path with steep ascents and descents and wetland crossings, so caution is advised. Wilderness Patch Brook campsite.

Biscan Cove Path (Cape St. Francis - Pouch Cove) A 7.3-kilometre (4.5 mi) hike, of moderate difficulty, about 2–4 hours. The route can be challenging with steep hills.

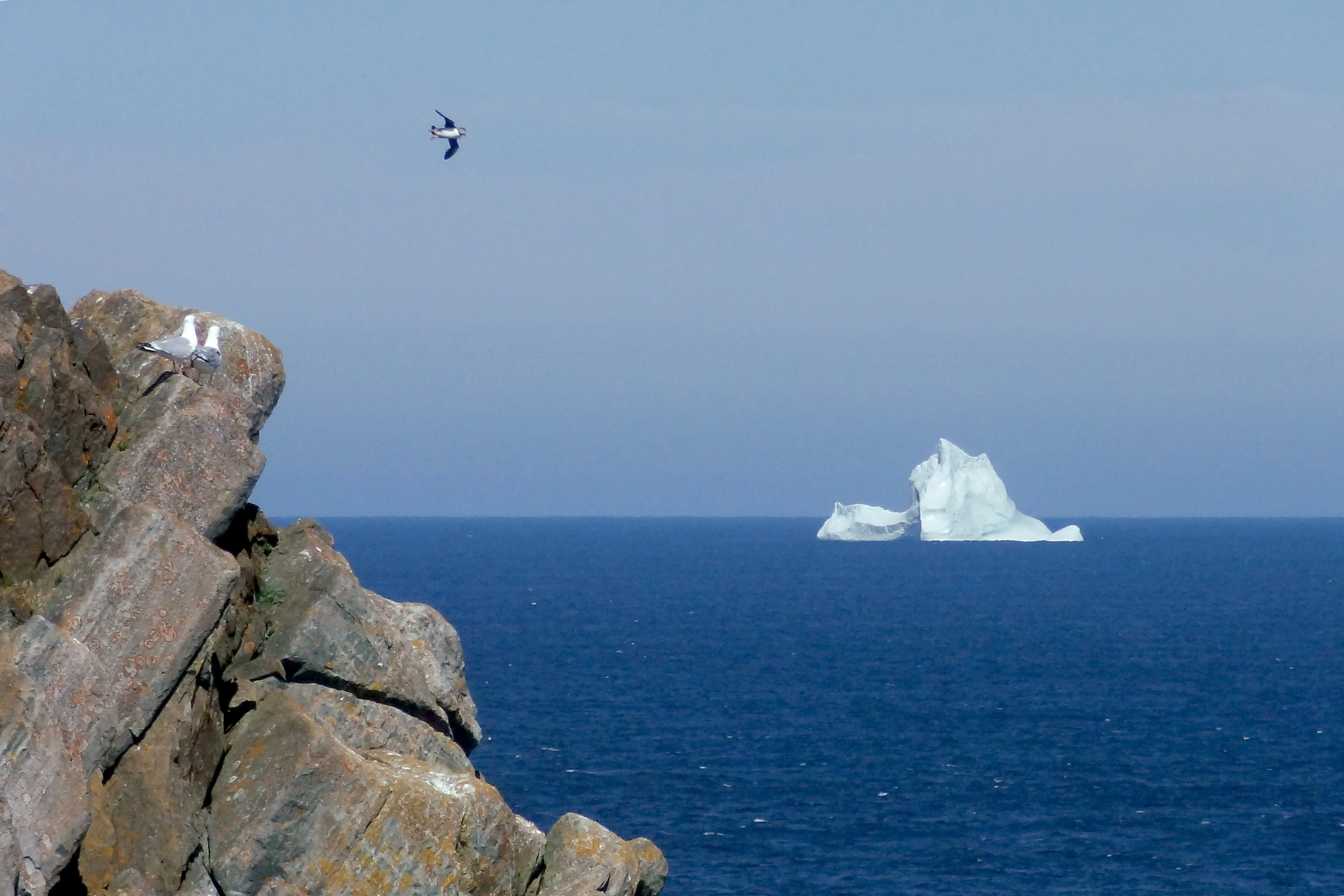
Icebergs like this can be seen off the coast of the Avalon.

Stiles Cove Path (Pouch Cove - Flatrock) A 15.1-kilometre (9.4 mi) hike of moderate difficulty. It takes 5–7 hours to complete. There are various access point. Swimming and picnic areas.

Father Troy's Trail (Flatrock - Torbay) An 8.7-kilometre (5.4 mi) easy hike, 2–4 hours, that follows the old cart road between the two communities and is "one of the few old roads on the Avalon to have retained its pre-automotive character". It features a stony beach, Tappers Cove wharf and mural and the Beamer, a rock formation. There is a less difficult inland alternatives at Church Cove.

Silver Mine Head Path 3.8-kilometre (2.4 mi) (Torbay - Outer Cove)

A 2.4-kilometre (1.5 mi) easy hike, of 1–2 hours. Features Middle Cove beach park and views to Torbay point and Flatrock.

Cobblers Path (Outer Cove to Logy Bay)

A 8.2-kilometre (5.1 mi) hike of moderate difficulty, that takes 3–4 hours. It is a popular, partially boarded hike that features "The Cobbler" (a five finger-like rock formation), the remains of a Pinetree Line radar station and seasonal whale watching.

Sugarloaf Path (Logy Bay - Quidi Vidi Village) A 8.9-kilometre (5.5 mi) hike that is at times difficult and takes 3–5 hours. It has varied terrain and features Sugarloaf Head and dramatic cliff face rock formations. It also provides view of St. John's and Quidi Vidi. A short section skirts the edge of the St. John's city dump where trees full of windblown plastic debris are known as the "Plastic Forest".

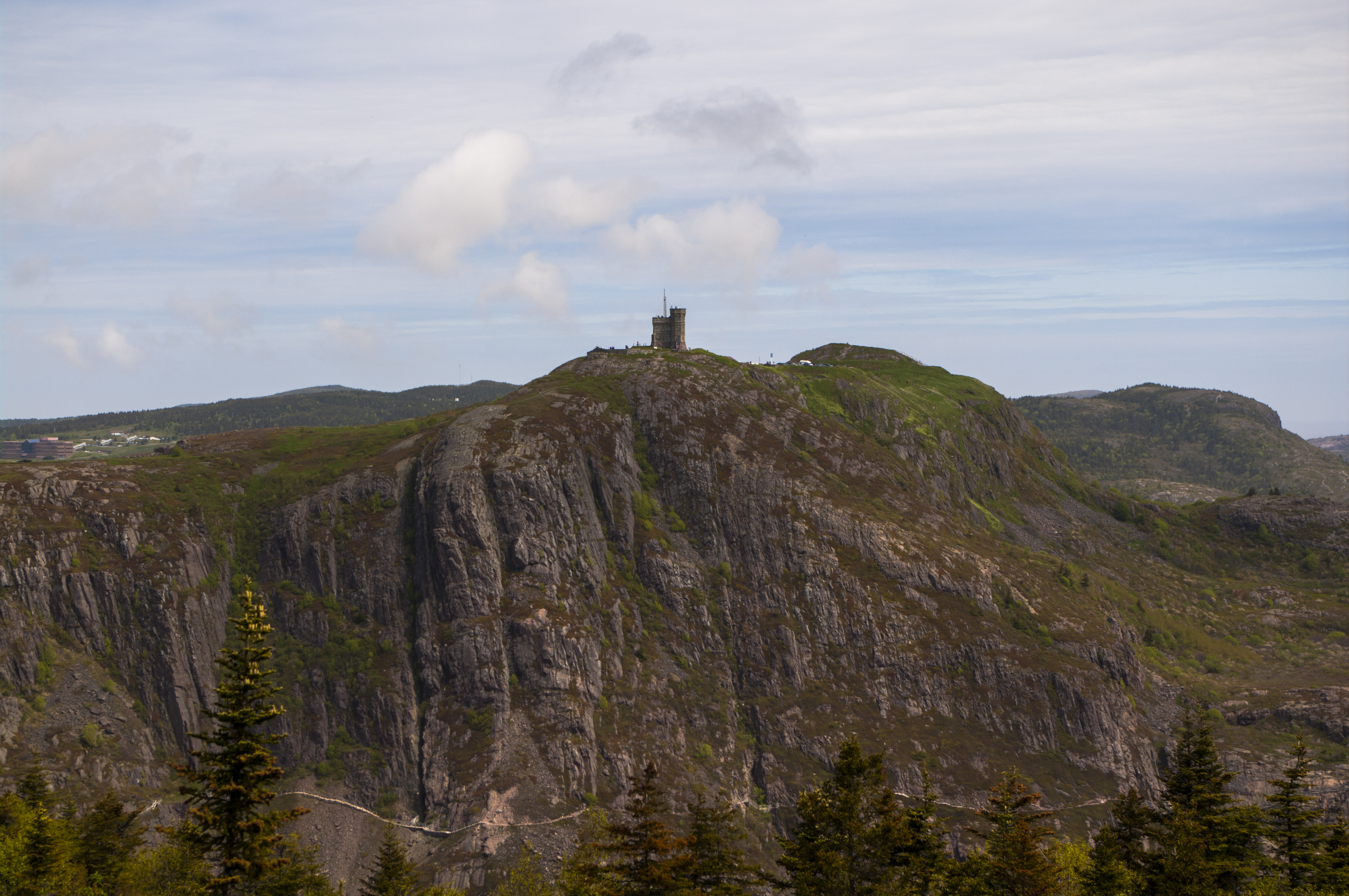
Signal Hill and Cabot Tower, St John's

City of St. John's: Quidi Vidi to Fort Amherst The official ECT map shows a route through St John's via Cuckold's Cove, Cabot Tower, Signal Hill and The North Head Trail to The Battery. In addition The Grand Concourse Trailway system offers a choice of possible routes to Downtown St John's. From St John's to Fort Amherst, the ECT map again offers guidance. The route goes around the harbour, with a short-cut across a bridge across from the Railway Coastal Museum. Amongst the attraction's found in St John's are boat trips to view icebergs, and whales; The Rooms; Quidi Vidi Lake; Memorial University's Botanical Garden; the Johnson Geo Centre, a geological interpretation centre located on Signal Hill; historic Downtown, including the Basilica, St John's and Anglican Cathedral, St John's. There is also the Grand Concourse's extensive network of hiking trails within the city, and around its lakes, along its rivers, and through other open spaces.

=== St John's to La Manche ===
The middle section follows long, remote sections of coastline, the most easterly coast of North America, intersection a few towns such as Bay Bulls along Route 10, known as the Irish Loop, because the communities were mainly sealed by Irish immigrants.

Deadmans Bay Path (Fort Amherst - Blackhead) A 10.6-kilometre (6.6 mi) moderate to difficult route that takes 5–8 hours. There are path features side trails that can increase distance and time. There are steep ascents and descents. The route passes the Fort Amherst lighthouse, the former settlement of Freshwater, and a barachois with remains of the Vasco d'Orey shipwreck. The Nature Conservancy of Canada has a reserve at Freshwater. There are also seasonal swimming holes, berry grounds and bird nesting views. There are side trails to this path from Shea Heights and the Cape Spear Road.

Cape Spear Path (Blackhead - Maddox Cove) A 9.3-kilometre (5.8 mi) path of moderate difficulty that takes 4–6 hours. The trail includes side trails. The path varies in terrain and features a nature conservancy area, Cape Spear National Historic Site, a lighthouse, a museum, and whale watching. The lighthouse Cape Spear is Newfoundland and Labrador's oldest surviving lighthouse and "has been restored to its 1839 appearance and visitors are able to see what it would have been like for a lighthouse keeper and his family to live there in the mid-19th century". (See also the Blackhead Path a 3.7-kilometre (2.3 mi) path between the small community of Blackhead and Cape Spear, that is easy to moderate in difficulty. It takes 1–2 hours to complete. The path is very exposed to the weather so caution is advised. Cabot Tower can be seen across the sea and the path ends at Cape Spear National Historic Site with its historic lighthouse).

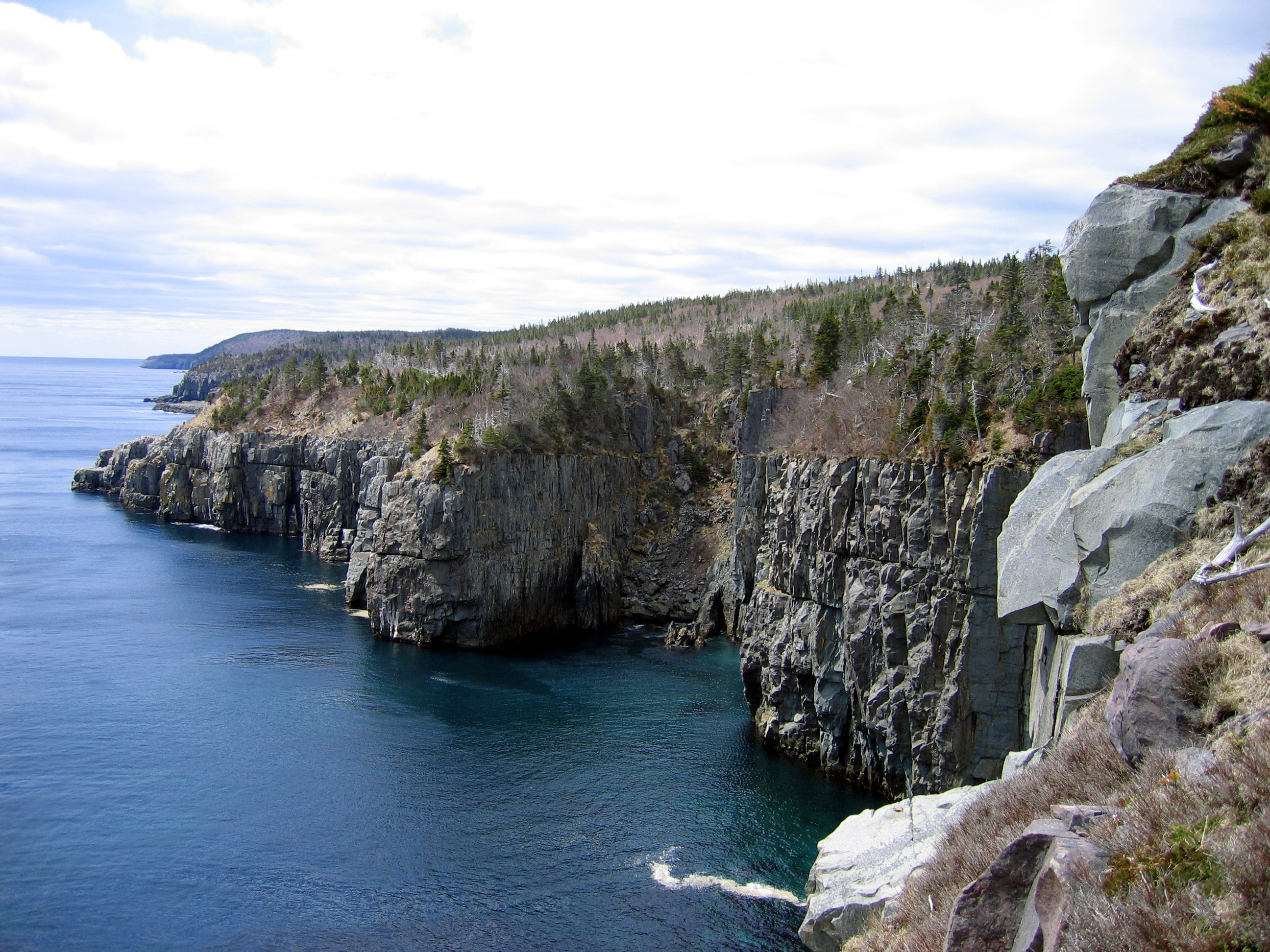
Shoal Bay

Motion Path (Petty Harbour - Shoal Bay Road) Walk through the two communities to the start in Petty Harbour. A 13.5-kilometre (8.4 mi) that is moderate to difficult. It takes 7–9 hours. There are steep ascents and descents on this "wild and exposed coastal trail". A 6.3-kilometre (3.9 mi) access path along Shoal Bay Road from the highway.

Spout Path (Shoal Bay Road - Bay Bulls) This path marks the halfway pint of the East Coast Trail. It is a 16.3-kilometre (10.1 mi) long and hilly path that is difficult to strenuous. It takes 5–8 hours. The path passes the Spout, a geyser, historic lighthouses, waterfalls, sea cliffs and sea stacks. The trail can be accessed via Shoal Road (6.4-kilometre (4.0 mi)) from the highway, but is otherwise remote with no "bailout" points.

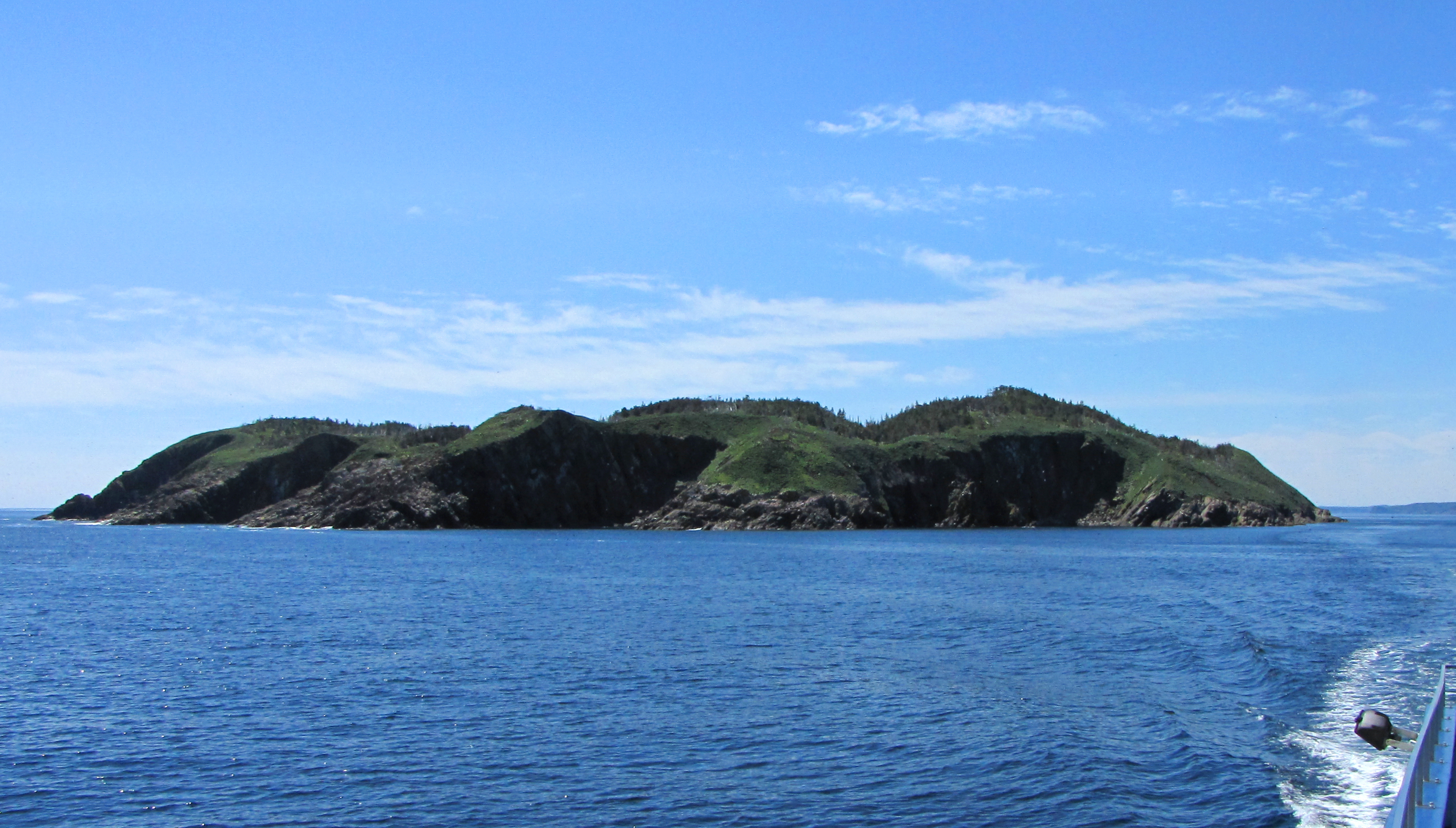
Gull Island, Witless Bay, part of the Witless Bay Ecological Reserve

Mickeleens Path (Bay Bulls - Witless Bay) A 7.3-kilometre (4.5 mi) walk of easy to moderate difficulty that takes 2–4 hours. The terrain varies from woods, meadows and cliffs. The seabird islands of the Witless Bay Ecological Reserve, such as Gull Island and Pee Pee Island, can be seen. The Reserve contains North America´s largest Atlantic puffin colony. and the world's second-largest colony of Leach's storm-petrels. There are red sandstone cliffs, and views of coves, sea stacks, gulches. In season there are boat trips from Witless Bay and Bay Bulls to view icebergs, whales, and the seabird colonies on the island's offshore.

Beaches Path 7.1 km (Witless Bay - Mobile) An easy 7.0-kilometre (4.3 mi) hike, taking 2–3 hours. It is a shoreline walk with mild elevation changes and there are a picnic area, and Mobile Beach. Witless Bay Ecological Reserve lies offshore.

Tinkers Point Path 5.0 km (Mobile - Tors Cove) A 5.1-kilometre (3.2 mi) easy hike that takes 2–3 hours. There is beach access, picnicking, and seasonal bird and whale watching. La Manche Village Path (Tors Cove - La Manche Village) A 6.4-kilometre (4.0 mi), easy hike that takes 2–3 hours. It is a relatively flat path though the woods that passes through the La Manche Provincial Park, 50-metre (160 ft) across a suspension bridge at the site of the abandoned village site of La Manche, a small fishing community which was abandoned and resettled following the destruction from hurricane waves in 1966. The storm destroyed the village and an earlier suspension bridge which had linked the community with Bauline East. and, offshore, the islands of the Witless Bay Ecological Reserve can be seen. A 1.4-kilometre (0.87 mi) access trail through the park from Highway 10 connects to the southern end of the path.

=== La Manche to Cappahayden ===
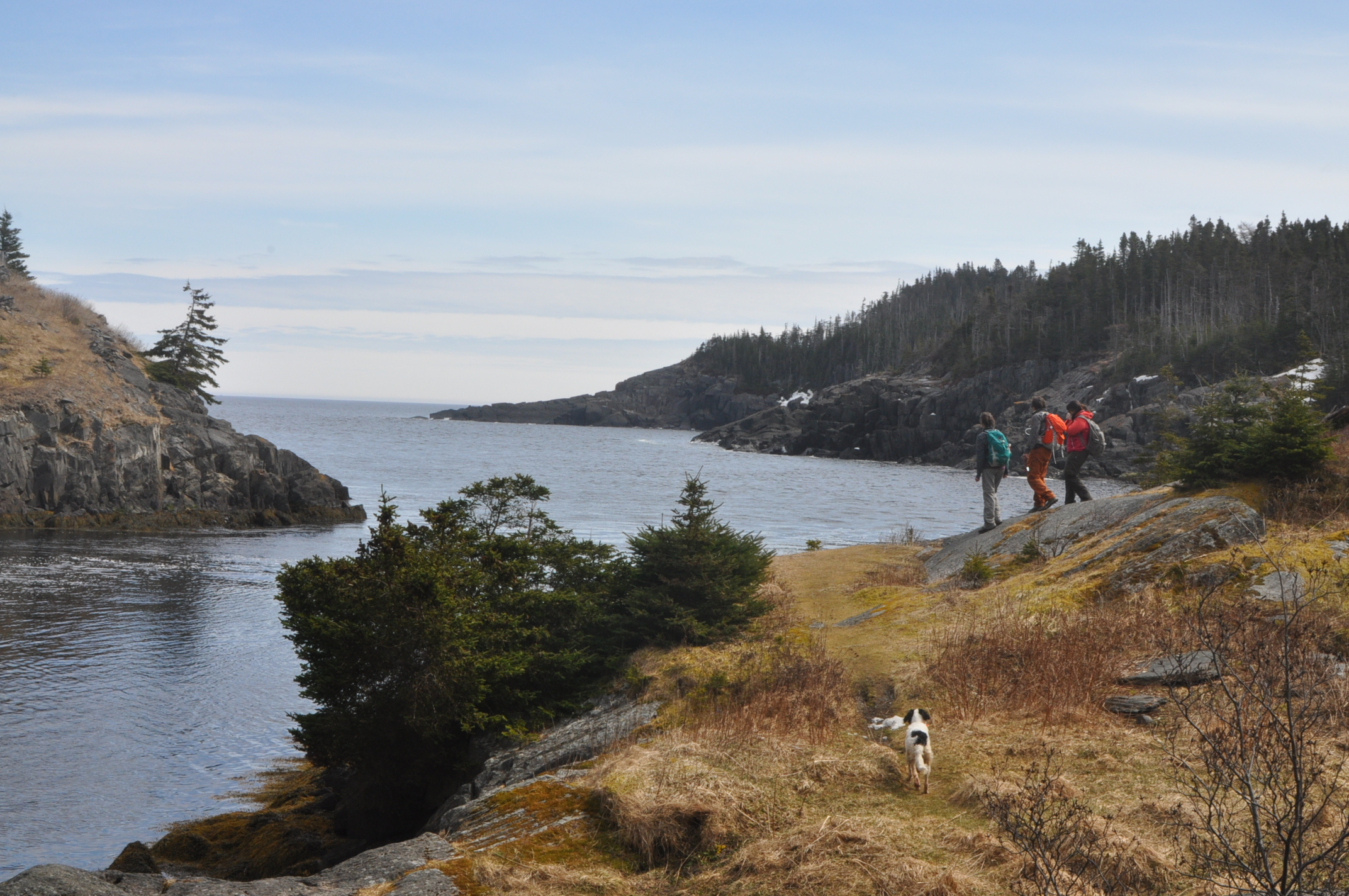
La Manche

The southern end of the East Coast Trail runs along remote headlands punctuated by long, narrow fjord-like bays with outport communities at their head. Some roadwalking is required within outports between the wildnerness coastlines.

Flamber Head Path (La Manche Village - Brigus South) A 11.5-kilometre (7.1 mi), moderate to difficult route that takes 6–9 hours. There is waterfalls and wilderness camping and seabird and seasonal whale watching. A 1.4-kilometre (0.87 mi) access trail from the highway.

Brigus Head Path (Brigus South - Admirals Cove) This 6.5-kilometre (4.0 mi) route is of moderate difficulty and takes 2–4 hours. It features Hares Ears rock formation at Hares Ears Point.

Cape Broyle Head Path 19.4 km (Cape Broyle – Calvert) A 18.3-kilometre (11.4 mi) long route that is difficult to strenuous and takes 6–8 hours. A hilly hike has stream crossings. It features a sandy beach, twisted rock formation, campsite and views of Ferryland's lighthouse.

Caplin Bay Path 5.6 km (Calvert - Ferryland) A 5.2-kilometre (3.2 mi) easy hike of 2–3 hours. A wooded walk with meadows and a section of elevated, old railroad track, and beaches and ocean views. There are side trails to Ferryland harbour and lighthouse. It passes close to the Colony of Avalon, National Historic archaeological site and interpretation centre, an old stone church, museum, tea room and dinner theatre.

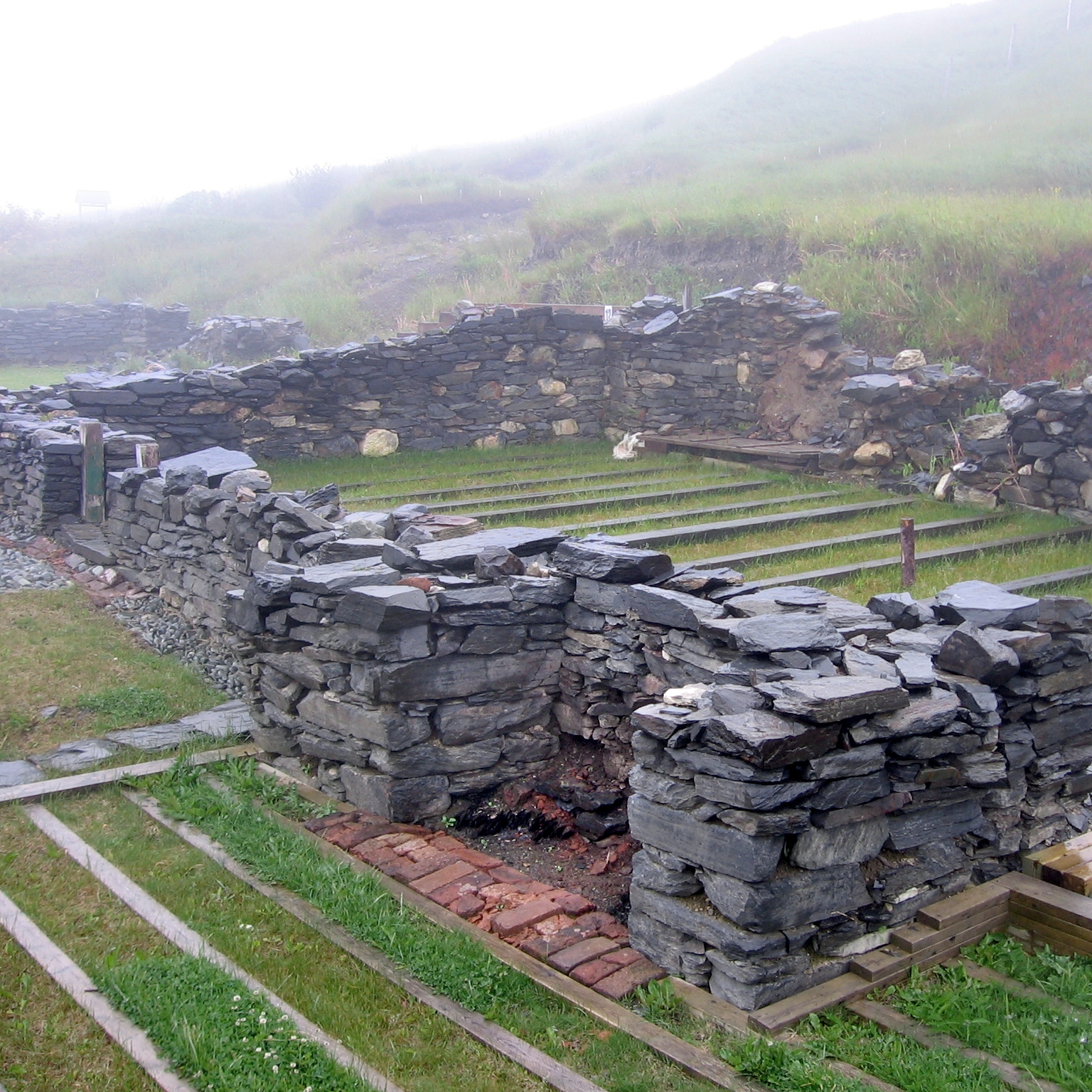
Archeological site Ferryland

Sounding Hills Path (Ferryland - Aquaforte CLOSED This 5.5-kilometre (3.4 mi) hike of easy to moderate difficulty normally takes 2–4 hours. A landowner near Ferryland closed access to the trail in 2017 over a dispute with the town of Ferryland over bridge maintenance. Although the bridge was fixed, the landowner has continued to deny access for hikers, forcing them to use a four km detour along the Route 10 highway. The southern section near the Spout River may still be accessed as far as Herring Cove.

Spurwink Island Path 20.4 km (Aquaforte - Port Kirwan) This a 17.1-kilometre (10.6 mi) long challenging hike that takes 7–10 hours. The path includes, since 2020, the former Mudder Wet Path with canyon and estuary views and a waterfall, followed by a rugged climb through headlands to the Berry Head natural sea arch and there is a wilderness campsite on the path.

Bear Cove Path 11.9-kilometre (7.4 mi) Kingman's Cove and Renews) A 11.6-kilometre (7.2 mi) hike of moderate difficulty. It takes about 4–6 hours. There are two historic sites, a settlement, lighthouse, and seasonal berry grounds.

Island Meadow Path (Renews - Cappahayden) A 10.1-kilometre (6.3 mi) hike of moderate difficulty that takes 4–6 hours, that is primarily made up of woodlands and headlands, and there are views of Renews Island.

=== Future Extension: Cappahayden to Trepassey ===
Not yet developed

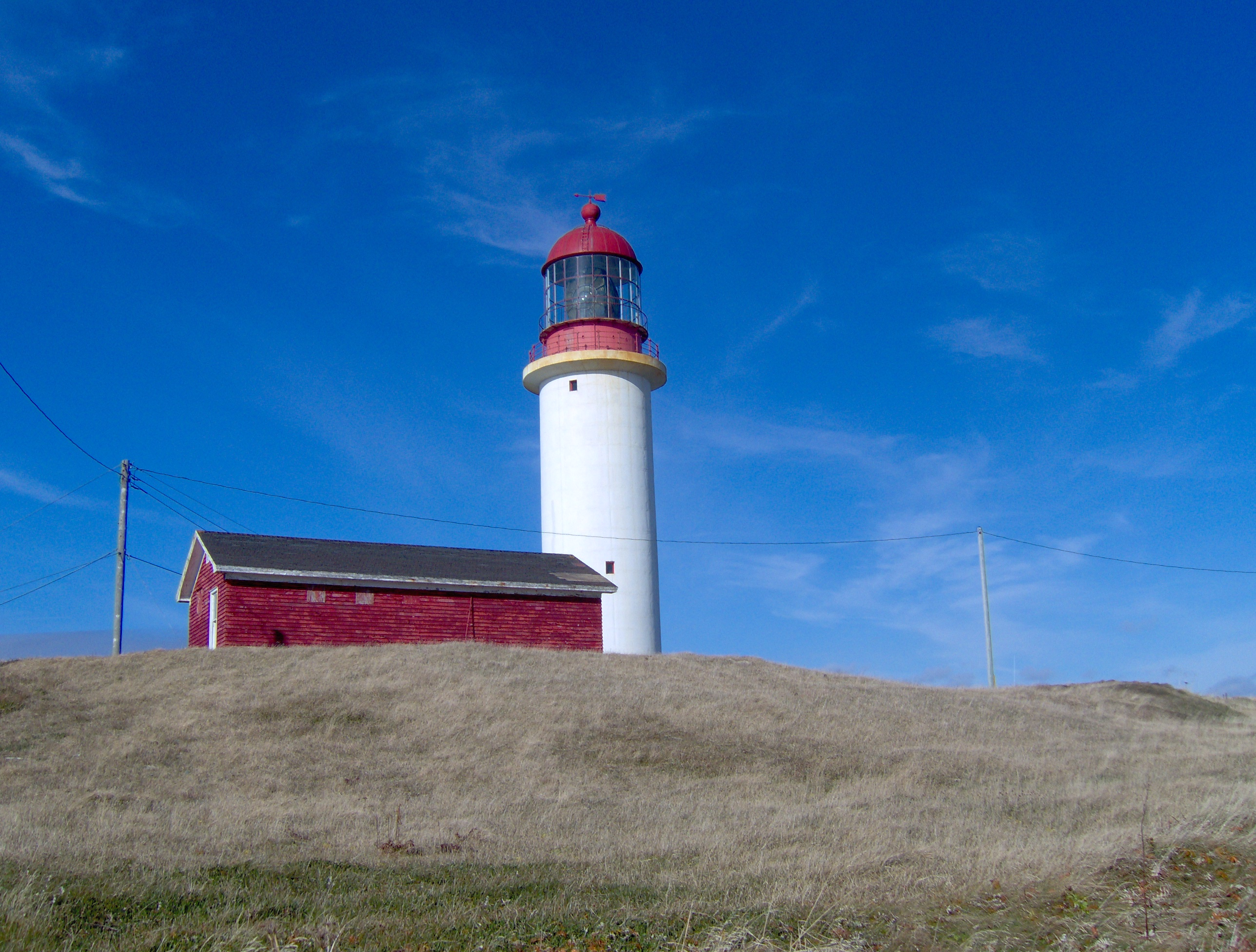
Cape Race Lighthouse, an eventual stop along the ECT.

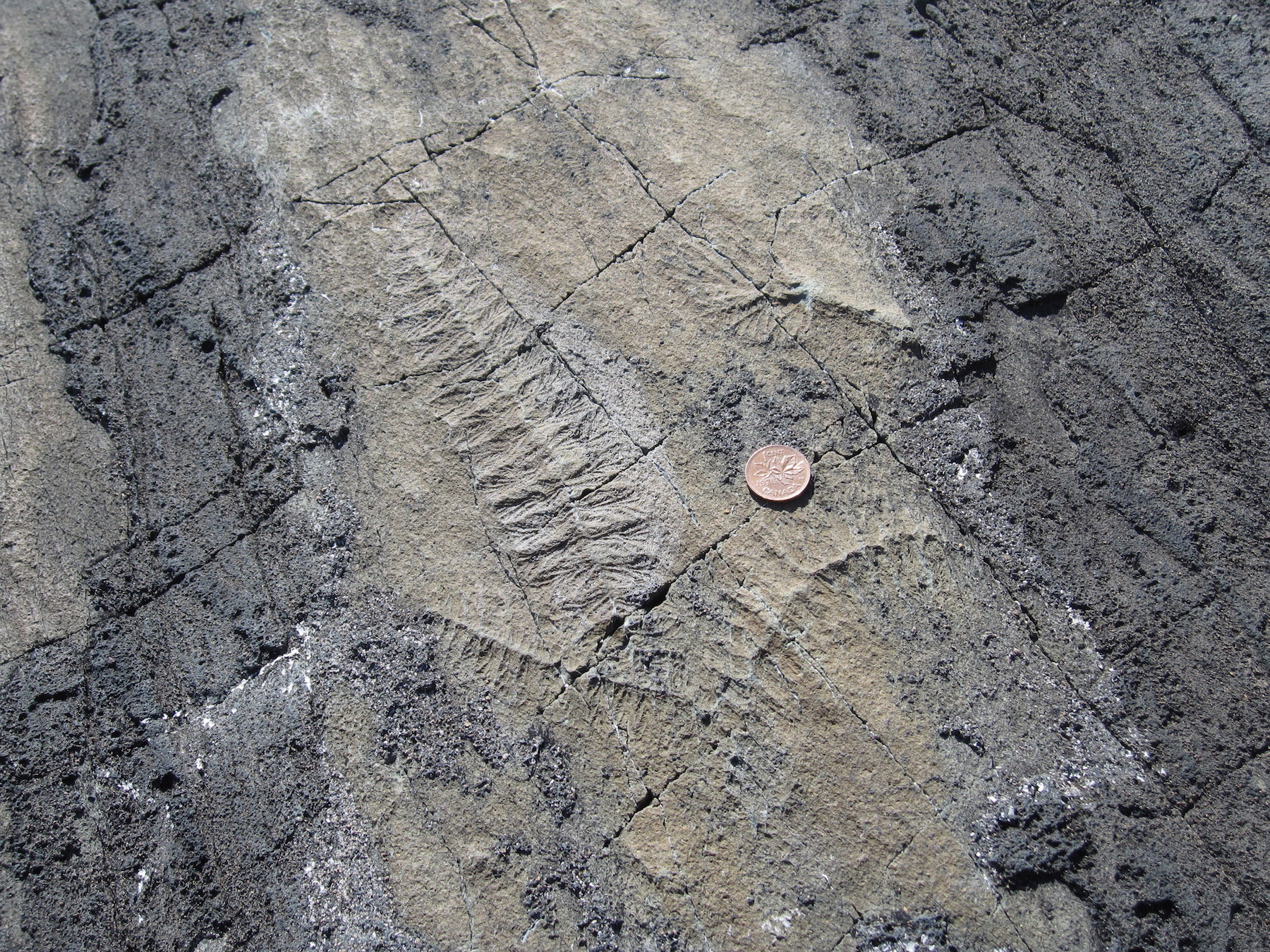
Ediacaran fossils Mistaken Point

Cappahayden to Trepassey via Chance Cove, Cape Race Lighthouse, Portugal Cove South and Mistaken Point Ecological Reserve.

Cappahayden to Chance Cove Provincial Park is undeveloped and includes gravel road, rough trail, moose path, bush-whacking, trackless bog, and deep river crossings. Chance Cove Provincial Park is a provincial park located approximately 20.0-kilometre (12.4 mi) south of Renews-Cappahayden. Chance Cove was once the site of a small settlement of approximately 50 people in the mid-19th century, but it "was abandoned between 1884 and 1891 following a series of disastrous years in the fishery".

Chance Cove to Cape Race is another difficult undeveloped, unmarked route, especially the middle section.

Cape Race to Trepassey. There is a 32.75-kilometre (20.35 mi) road between Cape Race, Portugal Cove South, and Trepassey that passes Mistaken Point Ecological Reserve a wilderness area and a UNESCO World Heritage Site. The reserve is home to the Mistaken Point Formation, which contains one of the most diverse and well-preserved collections of Precambrian fossils in the world. Ediacaran fossils discovered at the site constitute the oldest known remnants of multicellular life on Earth.

Portugal Cove South is 19-kilometre (12 mi) from Cape Race.

== Accommodation ==
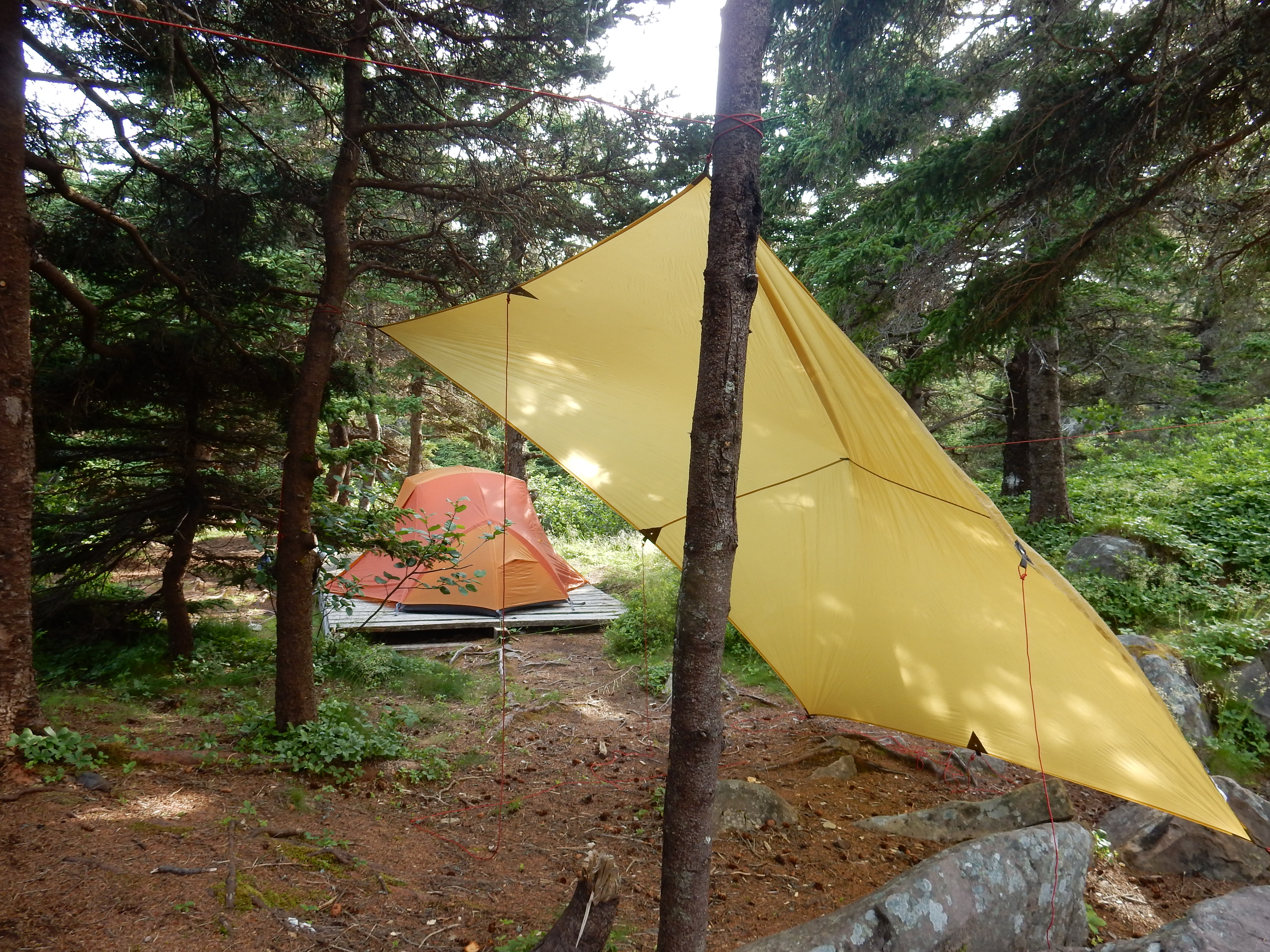
Tenting platforms at the campsite maintained by the ECT on The Spout Path, 2018

The East Coast Trail Association maintains six designated, primitive campsites (providing level sites or platforms and outhouses) located at the midpoint of six of the longer paths: White Horse Path, Motion Path, Spout Path, Flamber Head Path, Cape Broyle Head Path and Spurwink Island Path. The campsites are first-come, first-serve basis and often fill up on weekends. The La Manche Provincial Park, located a short distance from the trail offers fully-serviced campsites that can be reserved. There are also informal, non-designated campsite along the trail.

The trail crosses 30 different communities, ranging from the City of St. John's, to towns and small outports which offer a range of accommodation such as bed and breakfasts and guest houses close to the trail. For these accommodations, see:

- ECT Directory: Accommodations and Camping
- Newfoundland and Labrador Tourism

== Transportation ==
Buses can be used to access Logy Bay, including road walk; Quidi Vidi; Fort Amherst with road walk; Shea Heights for Deadman's Bay and Freshwater; Shoal Bay Road. There is minibus taxi service to and from Treppassey; Cape Spear (seasonal bus – frequent service).

== Natural environment ==
=== Landscape ===
The Avalon Peninsula has over 2,500 kilometres of coastline, much of which rises abruptly from the sea and is indented with numerous bays and inlets. The landscape consists of boreal forest, heathlands, bogs, fens, marshes, many large rivers and numerous ponds.

=== Climate ===
Climate data for Logy Bay-Middle Cove-Outer Cove
Month	Jan	Feb	Mar	Apr	May	Jun	Jul	Aug	Sep	Oct	Nov	Dec	Year
Record high °C (°F)	16.0 (60.8)	16.0 (60.8)	15.0 (59.0)	24.0 (75.2)	26.7 (80.1)	30.0 (86.0)	30.0 (86.0)	31.0 (87.8)	30.0 (86.0)	24.0 (75.2)	25.0 (77.0)	15.0 (59.0)	31.0 (87.8)
Mean daily maximum °C (°F)	0.3 (32.5)	0.0 (32.0)	2.1 (35.8)	6.0 (42.8)	11.0 (51.8)	15.7 (60.3)	20.4 (68.7)	20.7 (69.3)	16.9 (62.4)	11.4 (52.5)	7.0 (44.6)	2.6 (36.7)	9.5 (49.1)
Daily mean °C (°F)	−3.6 (25.5)	−4.0 (24.8)	−1.5 (29.3)	2.4 (36.3)	6.6 (43.9)	10.8 (51.4)	15.6 (60.1)	16.3 (61.3)	12.8 (55.0)	7.9 (46.2)	3.7 (38.7)	−0.9 (30.4)	5.5 (41.9)
Mean daily minimum °C (°F)	−7.4 (18.7)	−8.0 (17.6)	−5.1 (22.8)	−1.3 (29.7)	2.2 (36.0)	6.0 (42.8)	10.7 (51.3)	11.9 (53.4)	8.6 (47.5)	4.3 (39.7)	0.3 (32.5)	−4.3 (24.3)	1.5 (34.7)
Record low °C (°F)	−24.4 (−11.9)	−25.0 (−13.0)	−23.3 (−9.9)	−14.0 (6.8)	−7.0 (19.4)	−3.3 (26.1)	−1.1 (30.0)	3.5 (38.3)	−1.1 (30.0)	−8.0 (17.6)	−13.0 (8.6)	−25.0 (−13.0)	−25.0 (−13.0)
Average precipitation mm (inches)	122.5 (4.82)	113.6 (4.47)	102.9 (4.05)	99.8 (3.93)	83.2 (3.28)	94.7 (3.73)	86.8 (3.42)	94.4 (3.72)	121.1 (4.77)	134.6 (5.30)	126.0 (4.96)	128.7 (5.07)	1,308.1 (51.50)
Average rainfall mm (inches)	72.9 (2.87)	68.6 (2.70)	77.6 (3.06)	89.9 (3.54)	81.4 (3.20)	94.7 (3.73)	86.8 (3.42)	94.4 (3.72)	121.1 (4.77)	134.1 (5.28)	116.7 (4.59)	96.5 (3.80)	1,134.6 (44.67)
Average snowfall cm (inches)	49.6 (19.5)	45.0 (17.7)	25.3 (10.0)	9.9 (3.9)	1.8 (0.7)	0.0 (0.0)	0.0 (0.0)	0.0 (0.0)	0.0 (0.0)	0.4 (0.2)	9.3 (3.7)	32.2 (12.7)	173.6 (68.3)
Source: Environment Canada

=== Wildlife ===
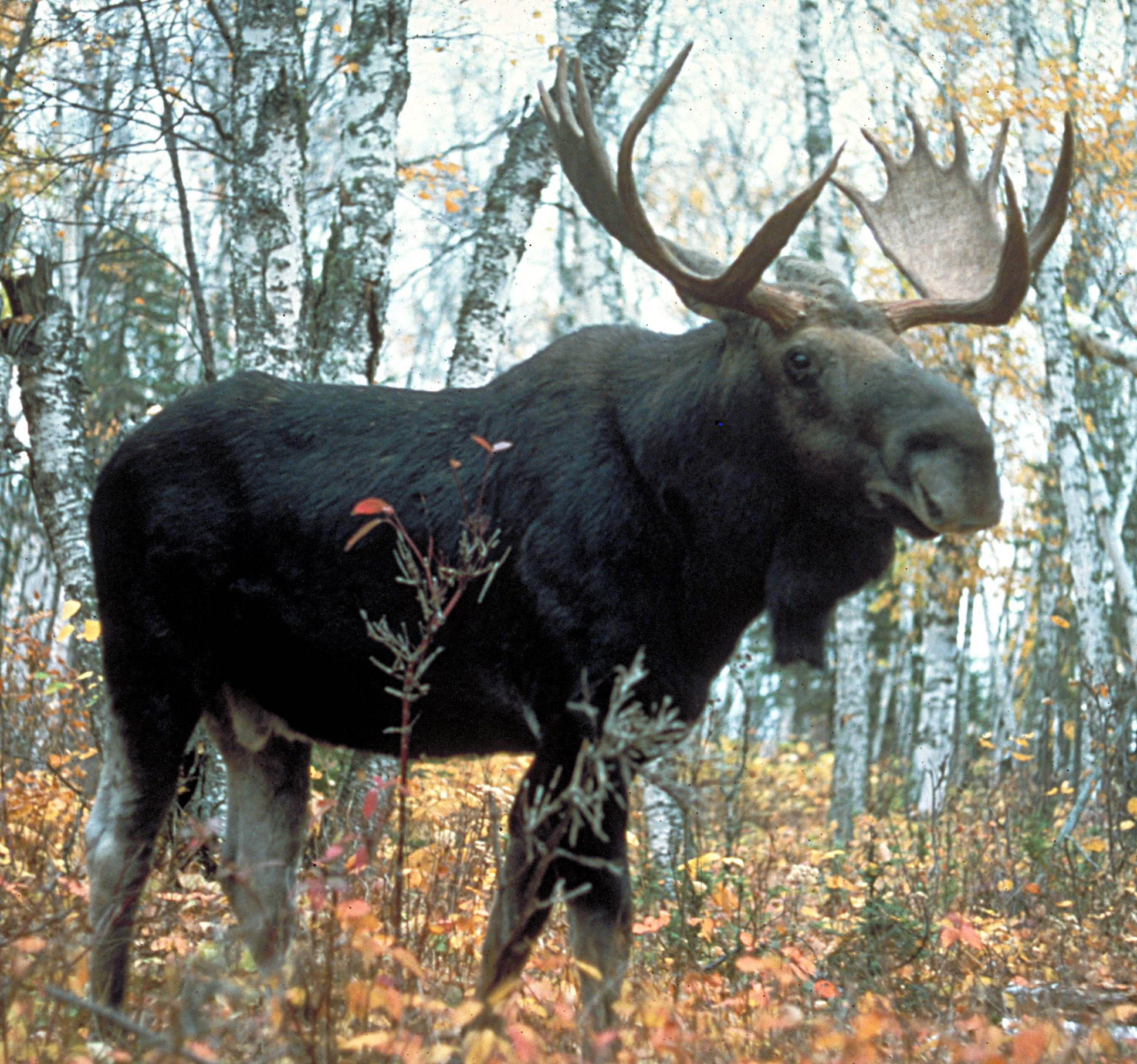
Moose, though not native to the island of Newfoundland, are common on the Avalon

There are no snakes or other reptiles on the Avalon, and while black bears are native to Newfoundland and Labrador, and found throughout the province, they are rarely seen on the Avalon Peninsula. Wolves are technically extinct on the Island but there are reports of migrants from Labrador and wolf-coyote crosses. Coyotes have migrated to the Island of Newfoundland and to the Avalon. Moose, though not native to the Island, are one of the most obvious inhabitants of the East Coast Trail. The tracks of the largest land animal on the Trail are nearly everywhere. Hikers are liable to encounter moose anytime, especially during twilight and early dawn. Hikers will often observe small trees and shrubs missing their growing tips where moose have munched the new growth as they walked along the Trail. Foxes, otters, beavers, Weasels, Snowshoe Hares (called rabbit by the locals), Seals, and Whales, are some of the other mammals that may be seen. Caribou can sometimes be seen in the vicinity of Trepassey, though the herd that frequents the Avalon Wilderness Reserve has dwindled in recent years.

=== Birds ===
Along this coastline are some of the greatest seabird hotspots in the world, with thousands of seabirds nesting in the area annually.

=== Berries on the trail ===
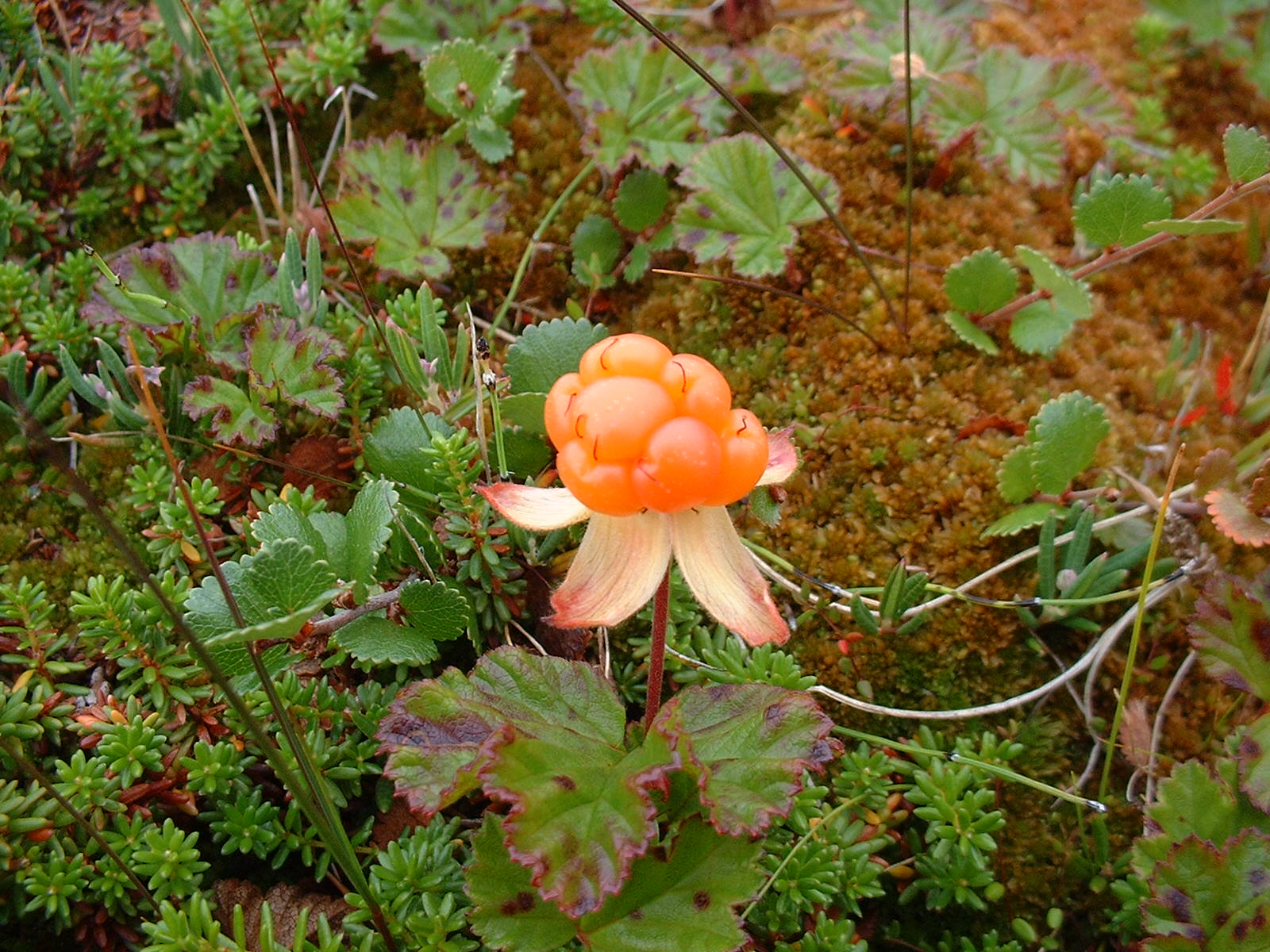
Bake apple. These highly prized berries are found growing in drier bogs.

Delicious berries can often be found along the Trail. Bake apples are the first to be found, around July, and are found in the numerous bog that are scattered along the Trail, and particularly along the Cape Spear, and Motion Paths. They are also known as cloudberry. Bake apples are highly prized by Newfoundlanders and are "confined to drier bogs". Wild strawberries are common in disturbed areas throughout Newfoundland. ... [They produce] small but very sweet berries by July and early August". Then, blueberries and raspberries can be found in August with Deadman's Bay, Blackhead Paths being good sources. Blueberries grow on "low shrubs in woodland clearings, on barrens and burn overs". September is a good month for blackberries, crowberries, and October for cranberries and the closely related marshberries. They both "ripen after the first frost, in late October and November". November is the best month to pick partridgeberries as frost improves their taste. They are also known as mountain cranberry, lingonberry or cowberry. and are found on barrens throughout Newfoundland.

== See also ==
Hazards of outdoor recreation
