= Manche (disambiguation) =

Manche is a French department in Lower Normandy.

Manche or La Manche may also refer to:

- English Channel (French: la Manche)
- Daniel Manche (born 1993), American child actor
- French frigate Manche (1806)
- La Manche, Newfoundland and Labrador, a former community in Canada
- La Manche Provincial Park, in Newfoundland and Labrador, Canada
- Manche Ch'ol, a former Maya people
- Manche Sanchez, a character on the television series Prison Break
- Neck (music), part of musical instruments, particularly used in French music

== See also ==
- La Mancha, a region of Spain
- La-Mansh, a Ukrainian rock band
