= Tors Cove, Newfoundland and Labrador =

Village in Newfoundland

Coordinates: 47°13′N 52°51′W

Tors Cove is a local service district and designated place in the Canadian province of Newfoundland and Labrador. It is on the east coast of the Avalon Peninsula of the island of Newfoundland, approximately 40 kilometres south of the St. John's, the provincial capital, along Route 10 (Irish Loop Drive/Southern Shore Highway). It was formerly named Toads Cove.

== Geography ==
Tors Cove is in Newfoundland within Subdivision U of Division No. 1.

== Demographics ==
As a designated place in the 2016 Census of Population conducted by Statistics Canada, Tors Cove recorded a population of 300 living in 136 of its 257 total private dwellings, a change of -33.2% from its 2011 population of 449. With a land area of 9.17 km^{2} (3.54 sq mi), it had a population density of 32.7/km^{2} (84.7/sq mi) in 2016.

== Economy ==
Throughout its history, its economy was sustained through the cod fishery and was the site of a codfish processing plant until the moratorium in 1991. It is also the site of a hydroelectric dam (located on Tors Cove pond) and power plant.

== Attractions ==
Tors Cove is on the East Coast Trail.

== Government ==
Tors Cove is a local service district (LSD) that is governed by a committee responsible for the provision of certain services to the community. The chair of the LSD committee is Hannah Power.

== See also ==
- La Manche Provincial Park
- List of designated places in Newfoundland and Labrador
- List of local service districts in Newfoundland and Labrador
