= La Manche, Newfoundland and Labrador =

Former settlement in Canada

Coordinates: 47°10′N 52°51′W

La Manche was a community on the east coast of the Avalon Peninsula of the island of Newfoundland between Cape Broyle and Tors Cove in a small inlet surrounded by steep hills. In French, la manche means "the sleeve". The area is named for the shape of the harbour, which is long and narrow with high sides. This harbour was probably first used by the French because of its seclusion which offered cover between raids on Ferryland and St. John's.

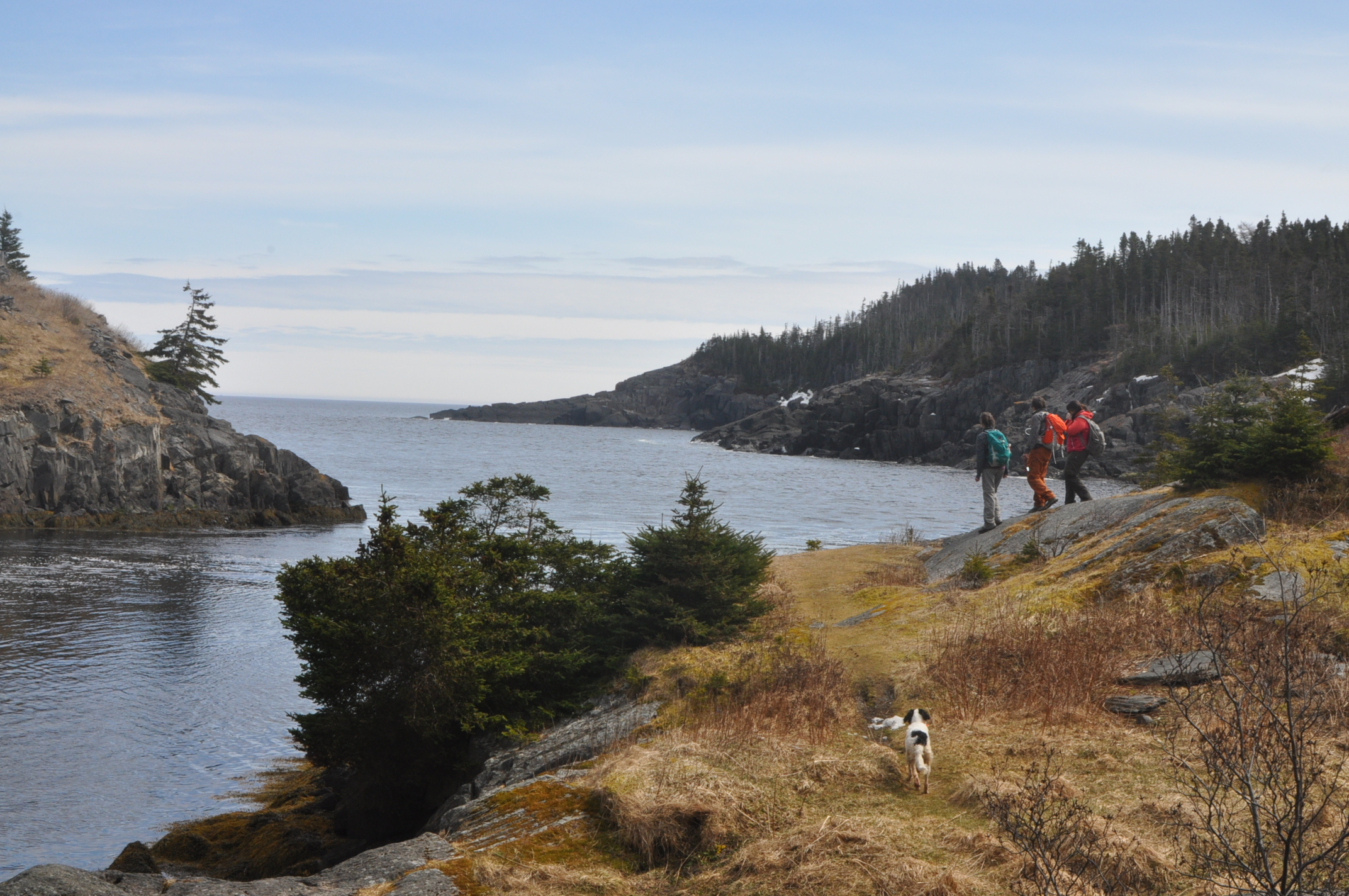
La Manche

== History ==
The community was first settled in the 1840s, apparently by a George Melvin. There was a small Roman Catholic church and a school located in the community, as well as a suspension bridge which crossed the inlet. At the time of Confederation in 1949, La Manche had a population of 54; by 1961, following the closure of the school, this had fallen to 25. La Manche was abandoned after a winter storm on 28 January 1966 which demolished the community's network of wharves and stages and collapsed the suspension bridge.

== La Manche Provincial Park ==
The remains of the community are now incorporated within the boundaries of La Manche Provincial Park. In 1999, the East Coast Trail Association rebuilt the suspension bridge across La Manche inlet, connecting the park trail system to the East Coast Trail.

== See also ==
- List of communities in Newfoundland and Labrador
- Resettlement (Newfoundland)
