= Pee Pee Island =

Island in Newfoundland and Labrador

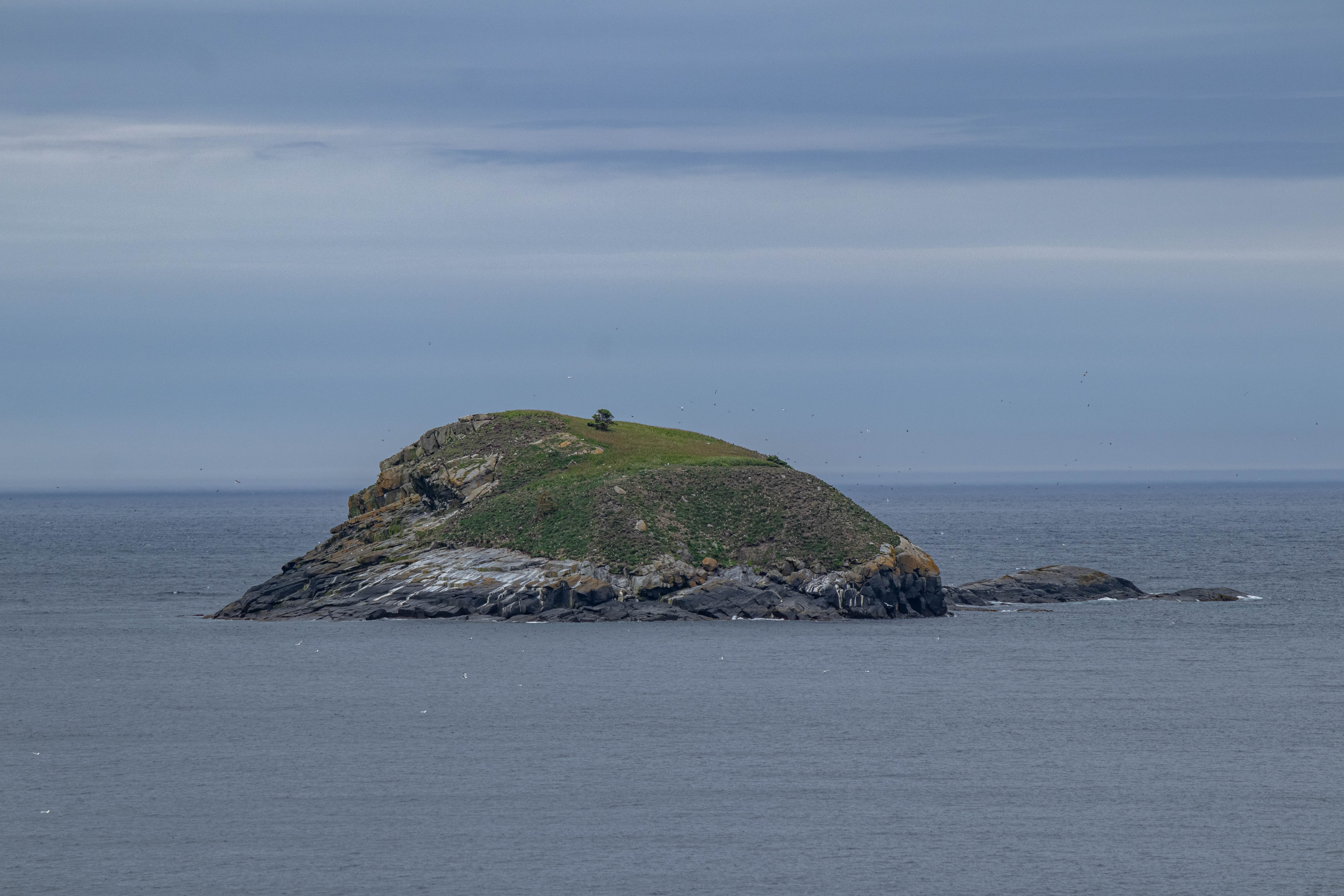

- Location within Newfoundland

Geography
- Location: Newfoundland and Labrador
- Coordinates: 47°11′29″N 52°50′14″W

Administration
- Canada

Additional information
- Time zone: NST

Pee Pee Island is a small island located in the province of Newfoundland and Labrador. It is the smallest of the four islands in the Witless Bay Ecological Reserve, which it became a part of in 1983. It serves as a breeding place for the Atlantic puffin.

== Name ==
In 1909, Michael Francis Howley reported that the island was generally called "Peepy", while some local residents used the names "Pebble Island" and "Peevet Island".

The Canadian Geographical Names Database lists "Pebble Island" as the island's former official name and records 5 October 1981 as the decision date for the official name "Pee Pee Island".

== Description ==
Pee Pee Island provides a breeding ground for up to 1300 pairs of Atlantic puffin and is part of the largest Atlantic puffin colony in North America. The island is made up of layers of dark grey sandstone and shale. It is only 250 metres from the mainland and easily viewed from the village of St. Michaels and the East Coast Trail.
