= Witless Bay Ecological Reserve =

Ecological reserve in Canada

- IUCN category Ia (strict nature reserve)
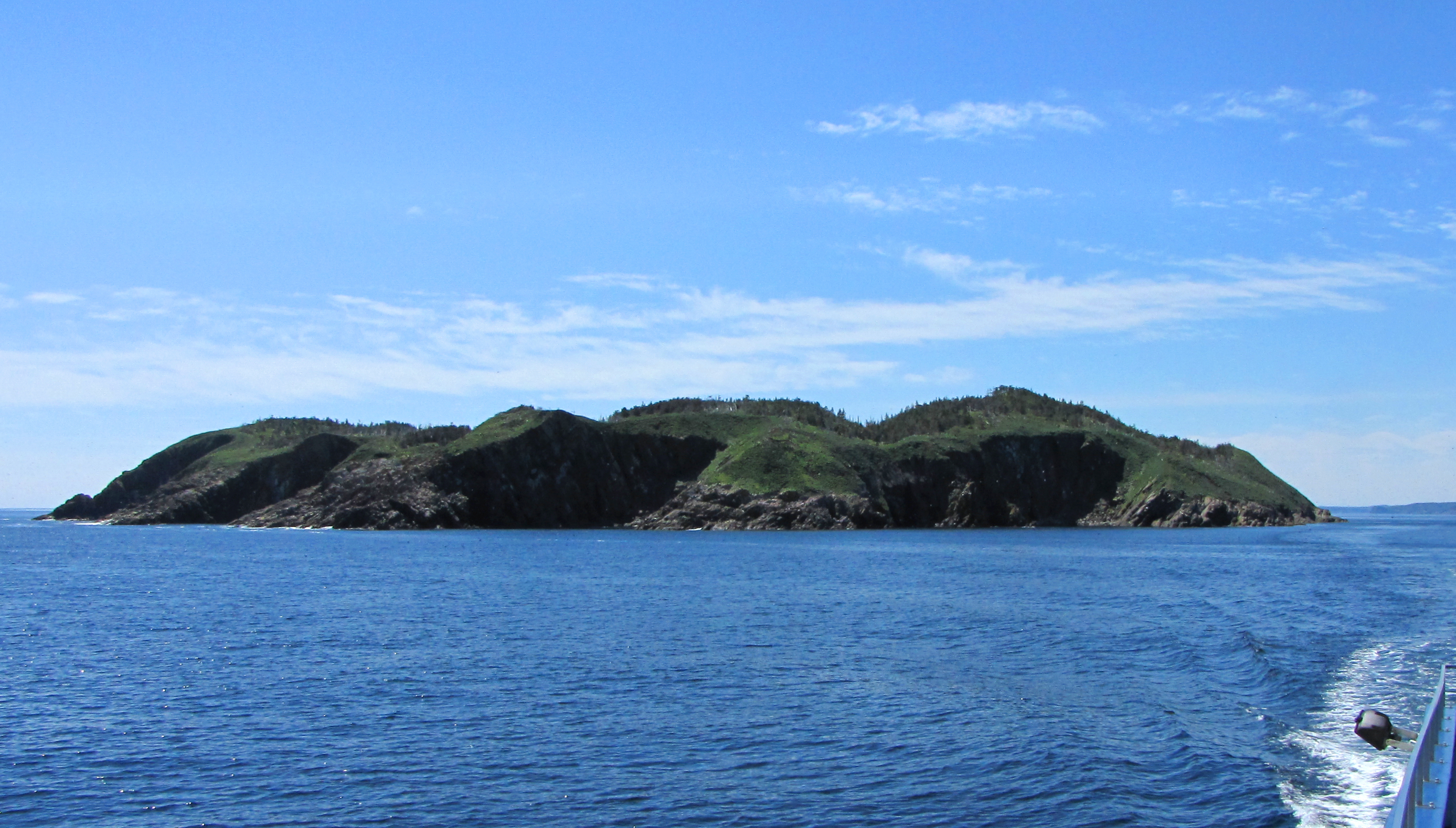
- Gull Island (largest of four islands in reserve)
- Interactive map of Witless Bay Ecological Reserve
- Location: Newfoundland and Labrador, Canada
- Nearest city: St. John's
- Coordinates: 47°13′47″N 52°47′27″W
- Established: 1964 (Wildlife Reserve), 1983 (Ecological Reserve)
- Governing body: Newfoundland and Labrador, Dept. of Environment and Conservation

Location of Witless Bay, Newfoundland

Witless Bay Ecological Reserve is an ecological preserve close to St. John's, Newfoundland and Labrador, Canada. The Witless Bay Ecological Reserve consists of four islands: Gull Island, Green Island, Great Island, and Pee Pee Island. Immense numbers of birds nest on these islands during the seabird breeding season, roughly from 1 April through 1 September.

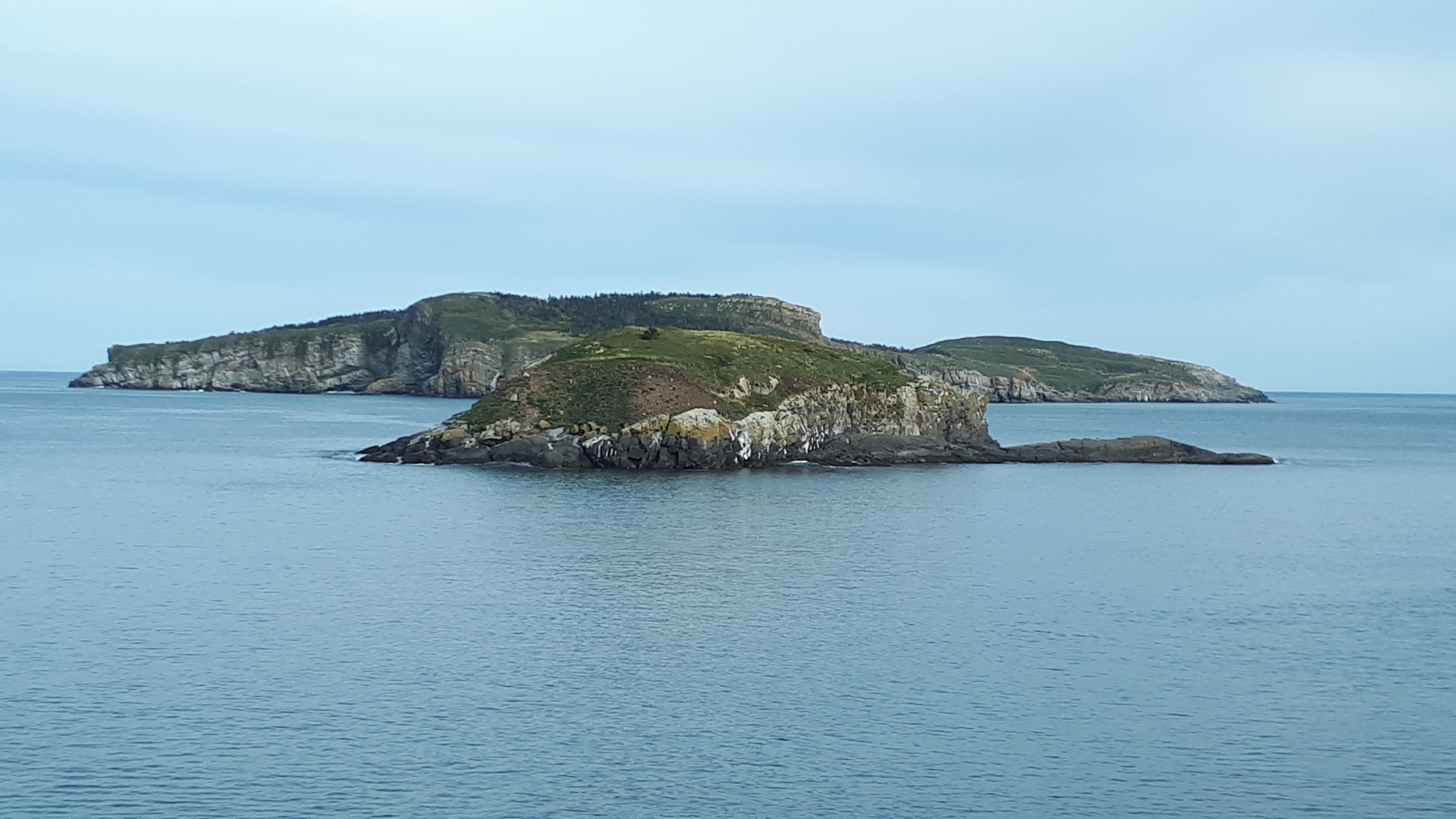
Two of the reserve's islands: Pee Pee Island in foreground with Great Island in background, 2020

The Witless Bay reserve contains North America´s largest Atlantic puffin colony. It is estimated that more than 260,000 pairs of Atlantic puffins nest there during the late spring and summer. The reserve also hosts the world's second-largest colony of Leach's storm-petrels. More than 620,000 pairs of these birds come here to nest every year. Thousands of black-legged kittiwakes and common murres arrive for the nesting season.

A tourism information centre is located in the reserve, by Lower Pond in the town of Witless Bay.

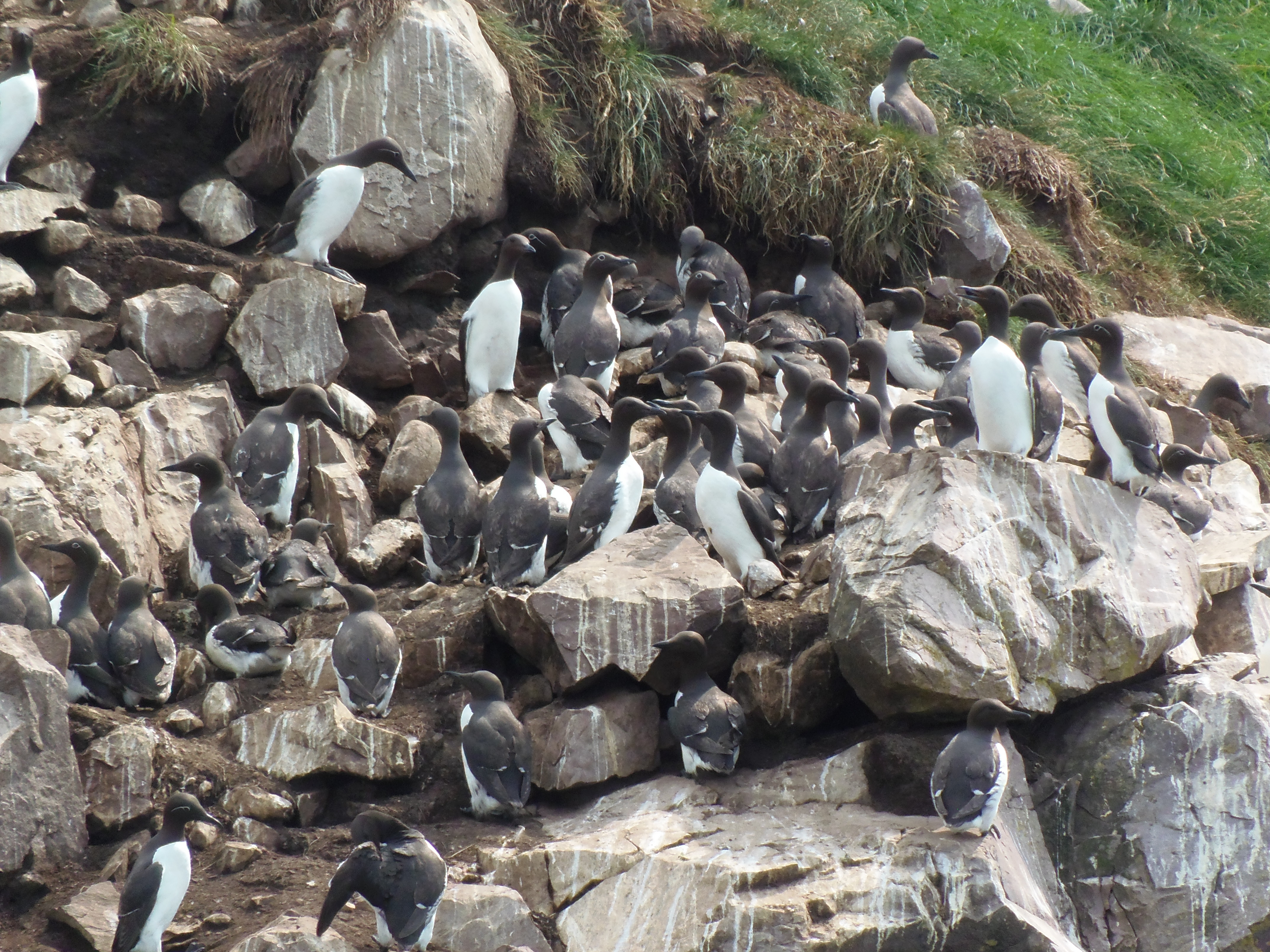
Common murres on Gull Island, Witless Bay Ecological Reserve

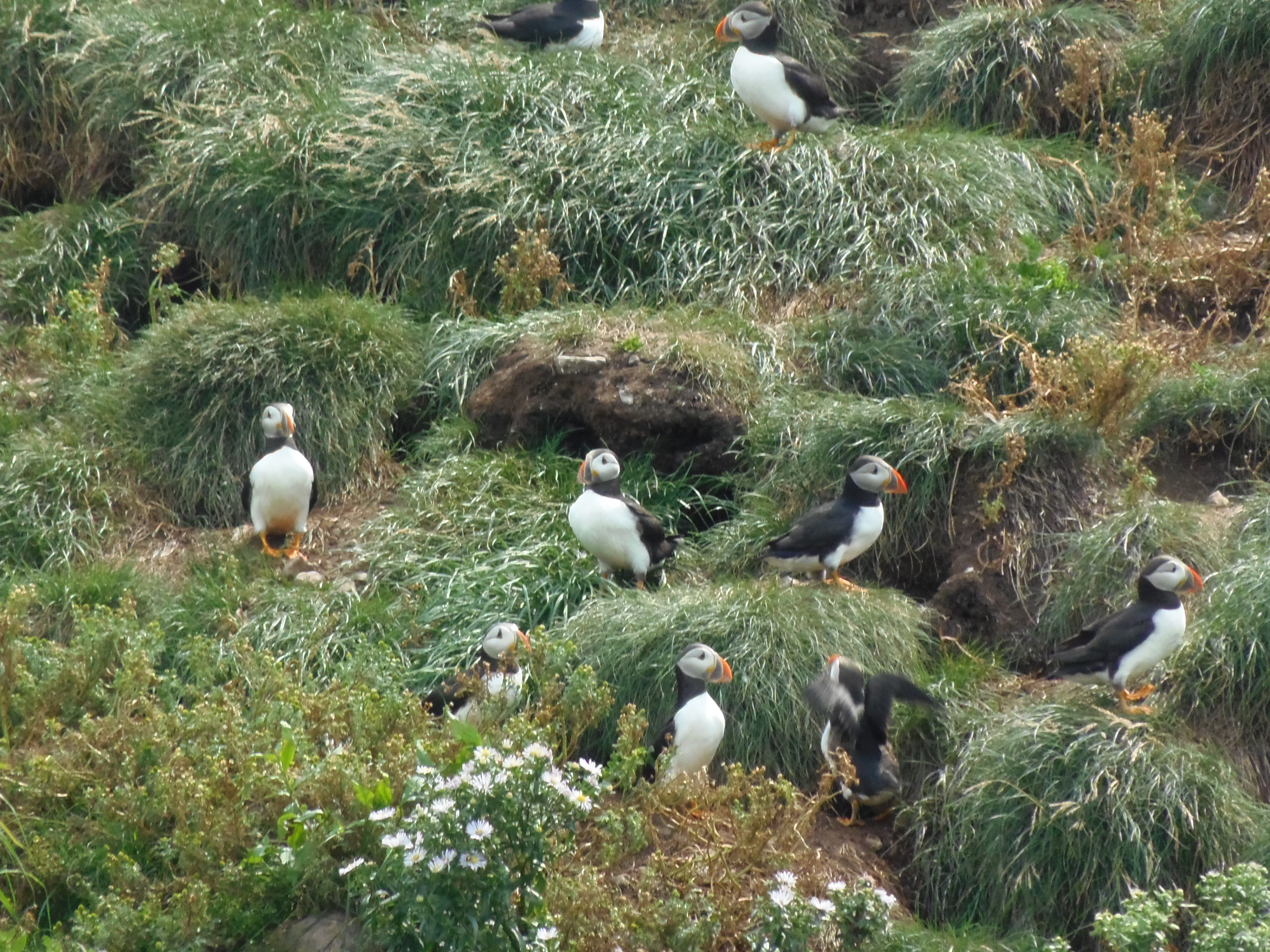
Atlantic puffins on Gull Island, Witless Bay Ecological Reserve
