= Shea Heights =

- Neighbourhood
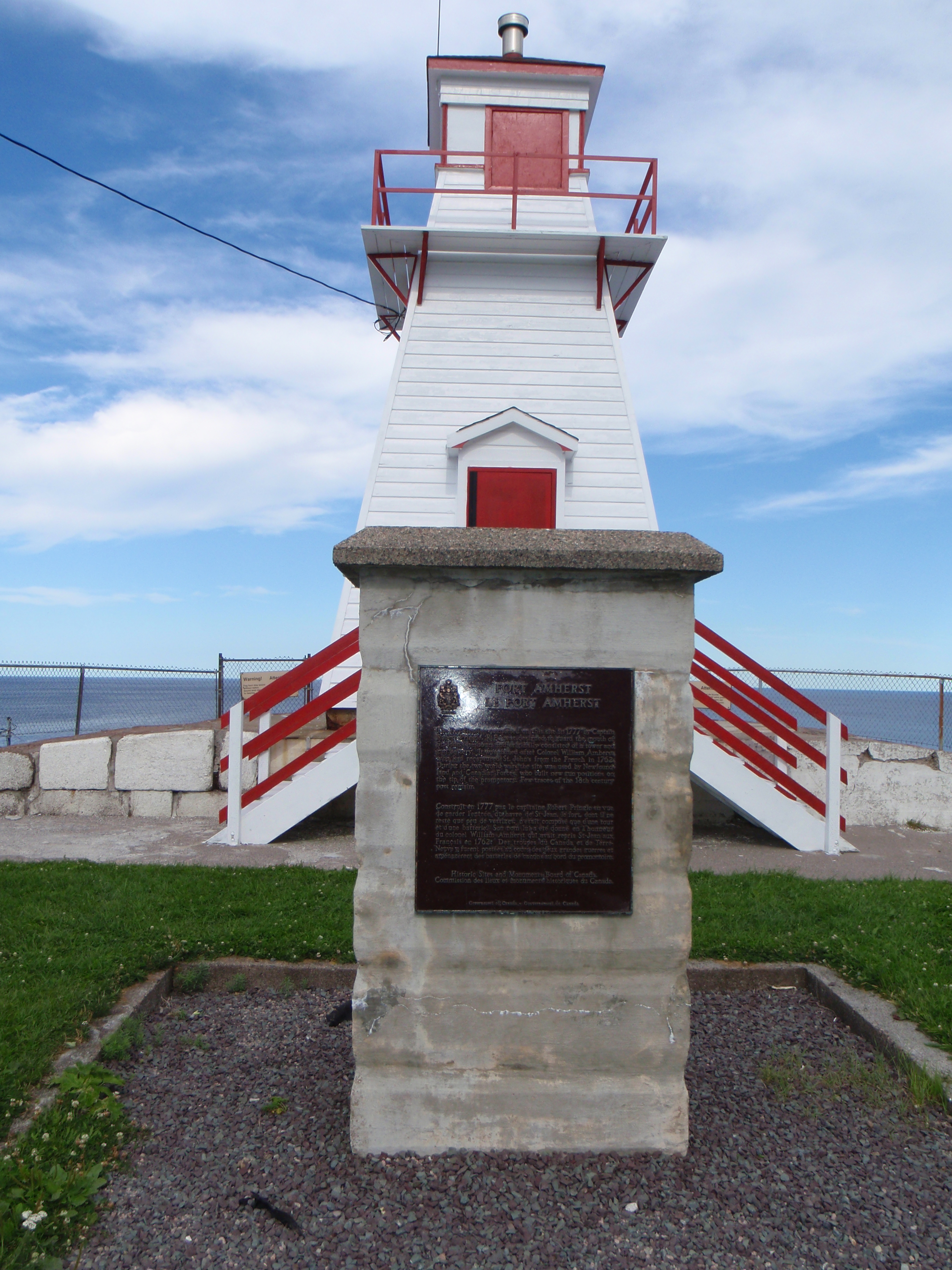
- Fort Amherst lighthouse in Shea Heights, Newfoundland

- Location within Newfoundland
- Coordinates: 47.5082°N 52.6733°W
- Country: Canada
- Province: Newfoundland
- City: St. John's, Newfoundland
- Established: 1930s (as Blackhead Road); 1984 (added to St. John's)

Shea Heights is a small neighbourhood located in the hills of St. John's, Newfoundland and Labrador, Canada. It is also locally known as "The Hill", and "The Brow".

== History ==
Shea Heights was originally settled outside of the city of St. John's in the 1930s. The community was originally called Blackhead Road, but changed its name to Shea Heights in order to honour a local priest. The community was added to the St. John's metropolitan region in the 1960s as part of the Canadian urban renewal project and fully integrated into St. John's in 1984.

A $4.1 million renewal project in the 1960s, announced by Joey Smallwood, helped transform the Blackhead Road community. At the time, about 2,000 people lived in 336 "tiny shacks." A reservoir was also created as part of the project. The residents of the community used a National Film Board of Canada grant to help demonstrate the need for a sewerage system to the provincial government in 1973.

The community was renamed Shea Heights sometime around 1977.

In 2001, Shea Heights was left isolated from the rest of St. John's after the remnants of Hurricane Gabrielle flooded streets.

In 2013, the community's post code, A0A 1J0, caused issues as it required mail to be sent to Shea Heights and not St. John's.

== Notable people ==
- Harold Druken, ice hockey player
- John Norman Jnr, darts player
