= La Manche Provincial Park =

Park in Newfoundland and Labrador

- IUCN category II (national park)
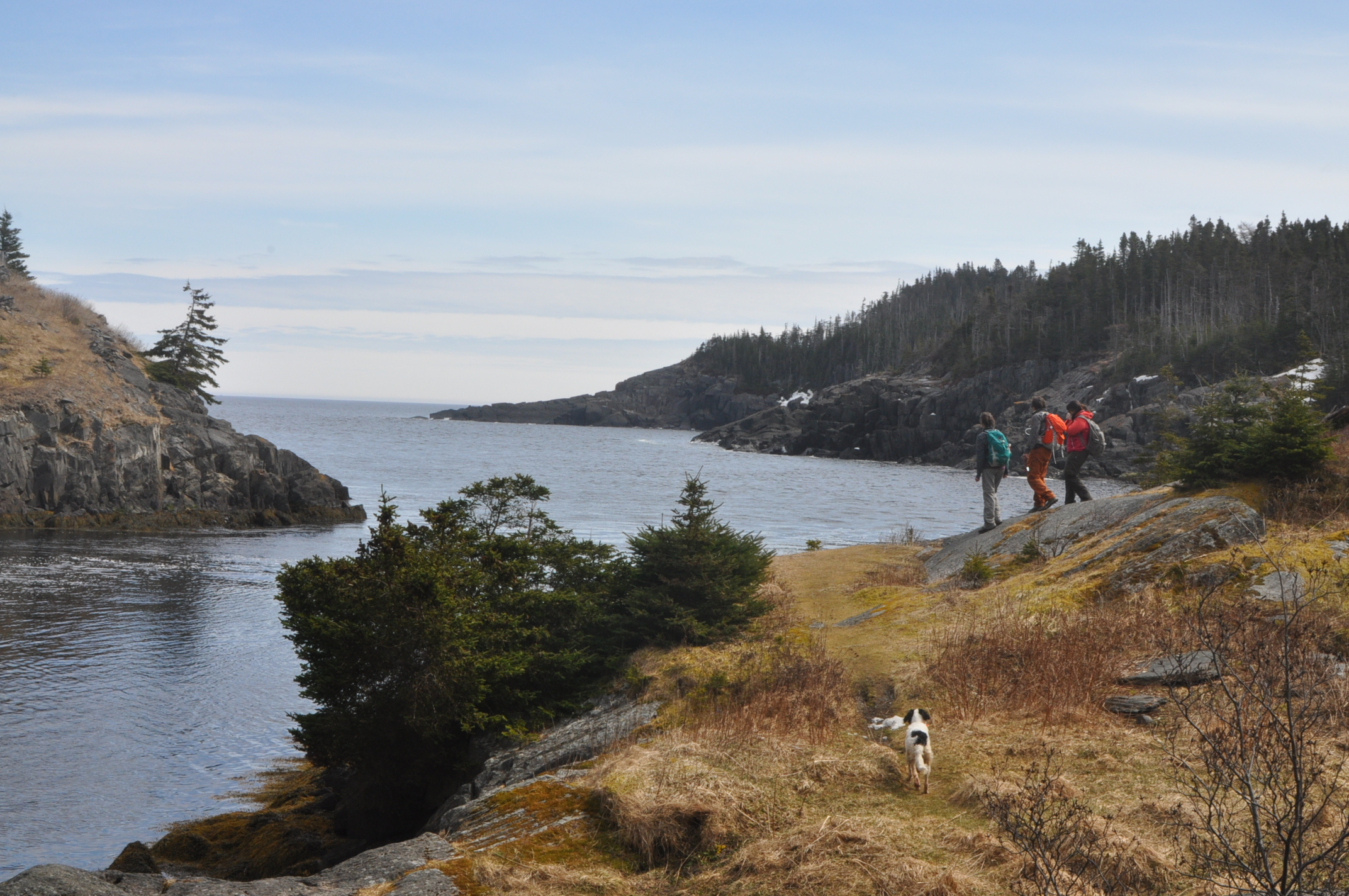
- Riverbank and shoreline in the park

- Location within Newfoundland and Labrador
- Interactive map of La Manche Provincial Park
- Location: Avalon Peninsula, Newfoundland and Labrador, Canada
- Nearest city: St. John's
- Coordinates: 47.1782°N 52.8883°W
- Area: 14.39 km^{2} (5.56 sq mi)
- Created: 1966
- Governing body: Parks Division of Newfoundland and Labrador
- Website: https://www.parksnl.ca/parks/la-manche-provincial-park/

La Manche Provincial Park, is a provincial park located 53 kilometers south of St. John's along Route 10 (Irish Loop Drive), on the island of Newfoundland, in the Canadian Province of Newfoundland and Labrador. It consists mainly of the abandoned village of La Manche, as well as some surrounding terrain.

== East Coast Trail ==
The East Coast Trail's La Manche Village Path, which runs from Tors Cove to La Manche Village, enters the Park and crosses the La Manche River by a suspension bridge. The Flamber Head Path continues for 11.5km from the resettled La Manche Village to Brigus South. The Flamber Head Path is also accessible via a 1.4km access trail from within the park.

== La Manche Village ==
The community was first settled in the 1840s, apparently by a George Melvin. There was a small Roman Catholic church and a school located in the community, as well as a suspension bridge which crossed the inlet. At the time of Confederation in 1949, La Manche had a population of 54; by 1961, following the closure of the school, this had fallen to 25. La Manche was abandoned after a winter storm on 28 January 1966 which demolished the community's network of wharves and stages and collapsed the suspension bridge.

The remains of the community are now incorporated within the boundaries of the Park.

== See also ==
- List of Newfoundland and Labrador parks
- List of Canadian provincial parks
