= Newfoundland and Labrador Route 90 =

Highway in Newfoundland and Labrador, Canada

Route 90
- Salmonier Line; St. Mary's Bay Highway; Irish Loop Drive

Route information
- Maintained by Newfoundland and Labrador Department of Transportation and Infrastructure
- Length: 88.0 km (54.7 mi)

Major junctions
- South end: Route 10 in St. Vincent's–St. Stephen's–Peter's River
- Route 94 in St. Joseph's; Route 93 in Mount Carmel-Mitchells Brook-St. Catherines; Route 91 in Mount Carmel-Mitchells Brook-St. Catherines; Route 1 (TCH) in Holyrood
- North end: Route 60 in Holyrood

Location
- Country: Canada
- Province: Newfoundland and Labrador

Highway system
- Highways in Newfoundland and Labrador
← Route 81	→ Route 91

Route 90, also known as Salmonier Line and St. Mary's Bay Highway, is an 88.0-kilometre-long (54.7 mi) north-south Highway on the Avalon Peninsula of Newfoundland. It connects the communities along the eastern side of St. Mary's Bay with the Trans Canada Highway and Holyrood. The entire length of Route 90 also forms the western half of Irish Loop Drive.

== Route description ==
Route 90 begins in St. Vincent's-St. Stephen's-Peter's River at a bridge along the beach, which straddles a narrow isthmus between the ocean and a large lagoon (Holyrood Pond), with the road continuing east as Route 10. It turns north to pass through the St. Vincent's portion of town before leaving town and heading more inland along the shoreline of Holyrood Pond. The highway then turns west to pass through Gaskiers-Point La Haye and follow the coastline again to pass through the towns of St. Mary's and Riverhead, where it has an intersection with a local road leading to Mall Bay. Route 90 then turns inland again as it travels up a narrow valley centered along a small stream (Riverhead River) for several kilometres before crossing the river and passing northwest through rural wooded and hilly terrain for the next several kilometres. It now passes through St. Joseph's, where it has an intersection with Route 94 (Admirals Beach Road), Forest Field-New Bridge, and Mount Carmel-Mitchells Brook-St. Catherines, where it crosses the Salmonier River and has intersections with Route 93 (Mount Carmel Road) and Route 91 (Old Placentia Highway) in the St. Catherine's portion of town. The highway winds its way northeast through rural wooded areas for several kilometres, where it passes by Salmonier Nature Park, before entering Holyrood at an interchange with Route 1 (Trans Canada Highway, Exit 35). Route 90 passes through neighbourhoods and crosses over the Daniels River before entering a business district and coming to an end at an intersection with Route 60 (Conception Bay Highway) near the coastline of Conception Bay.

== Major intersections ==
Location	km	mi	Destinations	Notes
St. Vincent's-St. Stephen's-Peter's River	0.0	0.0	Transitions to Route 10 north (Irish Loop Drive/Southern Shore Highway) – Trepassey	Southern terminus
Riverhead	28.2	17.5	Mall Bay Road - Mall Bay	
St. Joseph's	46.6	29.0	Route 94 south (Admirals Beach Road) – O'Donnells, Admirals Beach	Northern terminus of Route 94
Mount Carmel-Mitchells Brook-St. Catherines	56.7	35.2	Route 93 west (Mount Carmel Road) – Mount Carmel, Mitchells Brook	Eastern terminus of Route 93
Mount Carmel-Mitchells Brook-St. Catherines	58.0	36.0	Route 91 west (Old Placentia Highway) – Colinet, Branch	Eastern terminus of Route 91
Holyrood	81.2– 81.4	50.5– 50.6	Route 1 (TCH) – Clarenville, St. John's	Exit 35 on Route 1
Holyrood	88.0	54.7	Route 60 (Conception Bay Highway) – Harbour Main-Chapel's Cove-Lakeview, Conception Bay South	Northern terminus
1.000 mi = 1.609 km; 1.000 km = 0.621 mi: Route transition

== See also ==
- List of highways numbered 90
