= Newfoundland and Labrador Route 94 =

Highway in Newfoundland and Labrador

Route 94
- Admirals Beach Road

Route information
- Maintained by Newfoundland and Labrador Department of Transportation and Infrastructure
- Length: 18.9 km (11.7 mi)

Major junctions
- South end: Admirals Beach
- North end: Route 90 in St. Joseph's

Location
- Country: Canada
- Province: Newfoundland and Labrador

Highway system
- Highways in Newfoundland and Labrador
← Route 93	→ Route 100

Route 94, also known as Admirals Beach Road, is a 18.9-kilometre-long (11.7 mi) north-south highway on the Avalon Peninsula of Newfoundland. It connects the communities of Admirals Beach and O'Donnells with Route 90 in the town of St. Joseph's.

== Route description ==
Route 94 begins in Admirals Beach at the Harbour and heads northeast through town before leaving and passing along the coastline of St. Mary's Bay for several kilometres. It now crosses an Inlet via a Causeway before passing through O'Donnells and turning more inland through hilly terrain. The highway now enters St. Joseph's as begins following the Salmonier Arm of St. Mary's Bay and passes through town for a few kilometres before coming to an end at a Y-Intersection with Route 90 (Salmonier Line).

== Major intersections ==
Location	km	mi	Destinations	Notes
Admirals Beach	0.0	0.0	Dead End at Admirals Beach's harbour	Southern terminus
St. Joseph's	18.9	11.7	Route 90 (Salmonier Line) – Holyrood, St. Mary's, St. Vincent's	Northern terminus
1.000 mi = 1.609 km; 1.000 km = 0.621 mi
