= Gaskiers-Point La Haye =

- Town
- Location of Gaskiers-Point la Haye in Newfoundland
- Coordinates: 46°52′N 53°37′W
- Country: Canada
- Province: Newfoundland and Labrador
- Incorporated: 1970

Government
  - MHA: Sherry Gambin-Walsh (LIB)
  - MP: Paul Connors (LIB)

Area
  - Land: 23.81 km^{2} (9.19 sq mi)

Population (2021)
  - Total: 189
  - Density: 9.7/km^{2} (25/sq mi)
- Time zone: UTC-3:30 (Newfoundland Time)
  - Summer (DST): UTC-2:30 (Newfoundland Daylight)
- Area code: 709
- Highways: Route 90

Gaskiers-Point La Haye is a town in Newfoundland and Labrador, Canada, located in St. Mary's Bay. It is located southwest of St. Mary's. It became a local government community in 1970. In 2021, the town had a population of 189.

== Demographics ==
In the 2021 Census of Population conducted by Statistics Canada, Gaskiers-Point La Haye had a population of 189 living in 104 of its 128 total private dwellings, a change of −18.5% from its 2016 population of 232. With a land area of 23.29 km^{2} (8.99 sq mi), it had a population density of 8.1/km^{2} (21.0/sq mi) in 2021.

== Local attractions ==
Hare Hill Trail (Point La Haye) is a well-developed trail that was originally used by wood cutters, hunters and berry pickers for centuries. The trail is a total of three kilometres long and reaches an elevation of 135 m at its highest point. Upon reaching the top, there is a view of many communities in St. Mary's Bay.

== Towns and communities nearby ==
- Admiral's Beach
- Mosquito
- St. Mary's
- St. Vincent's-St. Stephen's-Peter's River
- Riverhead

== See also ==
- St. Mary's Bay
- Newfoundland outport
- Avalon Peninsula
- List of municipalities in Newfoundland and Labrador
