= List of shipwrecks in October 1842 =

The list of shipwrecks in October 1842 includes ships sunk, foundered, wrecked, grounded, or otherwise lost during October 1842.

== 1 October ==
List of shipwrecks: 1 October 1842
Ship	State	Description
Brothers	United Kingdom	The ship was sighted off the Dagerort Lighthouse, Russia whilst on a voyage from Liverpool Lancashire to Saint Petersburg, Russia. Presumed to be the vessel that subsequently collided with an Imperial Russian Navy frigate and foundered.
Combatant	United Kingdom	The ship was abandoned in the Atlantic Ocean. Her crew were rescued by Aurelia (United Kingdom). Combatant was on a voyage from London to Saguenay, Province of Canada, British North America.
Conrade	United Kingdom	The ship foundered in the South China Sea in a typhoon. Nine crew were rescued.
Dahlia	United Kingdom	The ship was wrecked on Little Pentland Skerry, in the Orkney Islands. Her crew were rescued. She was on a voyage from Liverpool, Lancashire to Saint Petersburg, Russia.
John and Mary	United Kingdom	The sloop capsized in the North Sea with the loss of two of her crew.
Jonge Phillip	United Kingdom	The ship was wrecked on Ameland, Friesland. Her crew were rescued. She was on a voyage from a Norwegian port to Groningen.
Monica	United Kingdom	The brig ran aground on the Cant Edge, in the Thames Estuary. She was refloated and resumed her voyage.
Neptunus	Sweden	The ship was wrecked on the Boller Scheere, off Hönö with the loss of all but one of her crew. She was on a voyage from Cádiz, Spain to Uddevalla.
Nymphe	United Kingdom	The ship was wrecked on Ameland. Her crew were rescued. She was on a voyage from Harwich, Essex to Buxtehude, Kingdom of Hanover.
Vine	United Kingdom	The ship ran aground on the Sparrow Hawk Sand, in the North Sea off the coast of Northumberland and was damaged. She was on a voyage from Grangemouth, Stirlingshire to Newcastle upon Tyne, Northumberland. Vine was later refloated and found to be very leaky.

== 2 October ==
List of shipwrecks: 2 October 1842
Ship	State	Description
Ann	United Kingdom	The ship departed from Rio de Janeiro, Brazil for the Falkland Islands. No further trace, presumed foundered with the loss of all hands.
USS Concord	United States Navy	The sloop-of-war was wrecked at the mouth of the Ligonha River, Portuguese East Africa with the loss of three of her crew. Unao (Portugal) rescued the survivors.
Cynosure	United Kingdom	The ship ran aground on a reef off Tree Island, in the Straits of Banca and was consequently abandoned. Her crew were rescued by George Buckham (United Kingdom). She was on a voyage from Singapore to Liverpool, Lancashire.
Daniel Colton	United Kingdom	The brig was wrecked on the Pentland Skerries, Caithness.
Sabine	United States	The ship was driven ashore and wrecked on the Atticranes. Her crew were rescued. She was on a voyage from New York to Campeche, Mexico.

== 3 October ==
List of shipwrecks: 3 October 1842
Ship	State	Description
Amalia	Prussia	The ship was driven ashore at Malmö, Sweden. She was on a voyage from St. Ubes to Gävle, Sweden. She was consequently condemned.
Ann	United Kingdom	The ship departed from Rio de Janeiro, Brazil for the Falkland Islands. No further trace, presumed foundered with the loss of all hands.
Dame	United Kingdom	The sloop struck a sandbank and foundered off Dunkirk, Nord, France with the loss of two of her crew. She was on a voyage from Dundee, Forfarshire to Dunkirk.
Ferdinand	Sweden	The ship was wrecked on Gotland. Her crew were rescued. She was on a voyage from Gothenburg to Bremen.
Fortuna di Stabia	Kingdom of the Two Sicilies	The ship was wrecked on Skagen, Denmark. Her crew were rescued. She was on a voyage from Messina to Saint Petersburg, Russia.
Otter	United Kingdom	The ship foundered in the Boston Deeps. She was on a voyage from Newcastle upon Tyne, Northumberland to Littlehampton, Sussex.
Pieta e St. Michaele	Ottoman Empire	The ship was driven ashore at Thisted, Denmark with the loss of two of her crew. She was on a voyage from Gallipoli to Saint Petersburg.

== 4 October ==
List of shipwrecks: 4 October 1842
Ship	State	Description
Blyth	United Kingdom	The ship was in collision with Jessie Ann (United Kingdom) whilst on a voyage from Newcastle upon Tyne, Northumberland to Great Yarmouth, Norfolk. She sank on arrival at Great Yarmouth, but was later refloated.
Eliza	United Kingdom	The ship was driven ashore and wrecked at Riga, Russia. Her crew were rescued. She was on a voyage from Kirkcaldy, Fife to Riga.
Royal Albert	United Kingdom	The ship was wrecked of Cape Mesurado, Liberia. Her crew were rescued. She was on a voyage from Liverpool, Lancashire to Africa.
Two Brothers	United Kingdom	The ship was run aground on the Herd Sand, in the North Sea off the coast of County Durham. She was on a voyage from South Shields, County Durham to Ipswich, Suffolk. Two Brothers was refloated and resumed her voyage.

== 5 October ==
List of shipwrecks: 5 October 1842
Ship	State	Description
Condor	(United Kingdom of Great Britain and Ireland) British North America	The ship was wrecked on the French Keys. Her crew were rescued. She was on a voyage from Jamaica to Halifax, Nova Scotia.
Langley	United Kingdom	The ship, which had been driven ashore on the coast of Courland two or three days before and then refloated, was abandoned in the Baltic Sea 6 nautical miles (11 km) off the coast. She subsequently came ashore at Rossitten, Prussia, where she became a wreck on 10 October.
Mars	United Kingdom	The ship struck the Whelps Rock, in the River Shannon and was severely damaged. She was on a voyage from London to Limerick.
Regina	United Kingdom	The ship was in collision with the steamship Rose and foundered in the Bristol Channel 3 nautical miles (5.6 km) north east of Naas Point. Her crew were rescued.
Romulus	United Kingdom	The ship was driven ashore and wrecked on Madeira. Her crew were rescued.
Sorteile	France	The ship was driven ashore at Europa Point, Gibraltar. She was on a voyage from Marseille, Bouches-du-Rhône to Charleston, South Carolina. She was refloated with assistance from HMS Lizard (Royal Navy).
Sylvian	France	The ship caught fire, exploded and sank in the English Channel 26 leagues (78 nautical miles (144 km)) from Fiennes, Pas-de-Calais. She was on a voyage from Fiennes to Cette, Hérault.

== 6 October ==
List of shipwrecks: 6 October 1842
Ship	State	Description
Annola	(Russian Empire) Grand Duchy of Finland	The ship was driven ashore on the south coast of Læsø, Denmark, where she subsequently became a wreck. She was on a voyage from Pori to London, United Kingdom.
Auckland	United Kingdom	The ship was in collision with John Daniel (United Kingdom) and foundered off St. Govans Head, Pembrokeshire. Her crew were rescued. She was on a voyage from Llanelly, Glamorgan to Dublin.
Belvidere	United Kingdom	The ship was destroyed by fire at Singapore. She was on a voyage from Bombay, India to China.
Gloria	Hamburg	The ship was driven ashore at Thisted, Denmark. Her crew were rescued. She was on a voyage from Hamburg to Saint Petersburg, Russia.
Jane	United Kingdom	The ship was in collision with Virgil (United Kingdom) and foundered in the North Sea. Her crew were rescued. She was on a voyage from Hartlepool, County Durham to Aberdeen.

== 7 October ==
List of shipwrecks: 7 October 1842
Ship	State	Description
Adele	Flag unknown	The ship was abandoned in the Atlantic Ocean off Cape Finisterre, Spain. Her crew were rescued by Gem (United Kingdom). Adele was on a voyage from St. Ubes, Portugal to Saint Petersburg, Russia.
Belvidere	United Kingdom	The ship was destroyed by fire at Singapore. She was on a voyage from Bombay, India to China.
Hoffnung	Bremen	The ship was driven ashore and wrecked on Ameland, Friesland, Netherlands. Her crew were rescued. She was on a voyage from the Clyde to Bremen.
Sandadesdo	Argentina	The ship was driven ashore and wrecked at "Hapoao" Brazil. Her crew were rescued. She was on a voyage from Buenos Aires to Bahia, Brazil.

== 8 October ==
List of shipwrecks: 8 October 1842
Ship	State	Description
Cecelia	Sweden	The ship was driven ashore on the Klein Holmes. She was on a voyage from Gothenburg to London, United Kingdom.
Eliza	United Kingdom	The ship ran aground and sank at Anticosti Island, Province of Canada, British North America with the loss of three of her crew. She was on a voyage from London to Quebec City, Province of Canada.
Sally	United Kingdom	The ship struck a sunken wreck off the Blacktail Beacon, in the North Sea off the coast of Essex. She was beached on the Maplin Sand, where she sank. She was on a voyage from Perth to London. Sally was later refloated and taken into Sheerness, Kent, where she arrived on 2 November.
Schemts	France	The ship ran aground at Saint-Louis, Senegal. She was refloated and put back to Saint-Louis.

== 9 October ==
List of shipwrecks: 9 October 1842
Ship	State	Description
RMS Isis	United Kingdom	The paddle steamer foundered 40 nautical miles (74 km) off Bermuda with the loss of one life. Survivors were rescued by RMS Medway (United Kingdom).
Merthyr	United Kingdom	The ship was driven ashore at Pill, Glamorgan.

== 10 October ==
List of shipwrecks: 10 October 1842
Ship	State	Description
Bucephalus	United Kingdom	The ship ran aground on the James and Mary Sand, in the Hooghly River. She was on a voyage from London to Calcutta, India. She was refloated and completed her voyage.
Comet	United Kingdom	The ship capsized in the Bay of Fundy. Her crew were rescued. She was on a voyage from Portland, Dorset to Windsor, Province of Canada, British North America.
George Gordon	United Kingdom	The ship was driven ashore at Kronstadt, Russia. She was refloated on 13 October.
Gratitude	United Kingdom	The brig struck the Craig Rock and was damaged. She was on a voyage from Arkhangelsk, Russia to Dundee, Forfarshire. Gratitude was refloated and assisted into Pittenweem, Fife the three fishing yawls.
Luna	United Kingdom	The ship was wrecked on the north point of Bornholm, Denmark. Her crew were rescued.
Margaret	(United Kingdom of Great Britain and Ireland) British North America	The ship was driven ashore in Placentia Bay. Her crew were rescued. She was on a voyage from Pugwash, Nova Scotia to Saint John's, Newfoundland.
Martha	United Kingdom	The ship was driven ashore at Kronstadt. She was refloated the next day.
Snow-ball	United States	The ship was wrecked on Salt Island, Connecticut. Her crew were rescued. She was on a voyage from Westport, Connecticut, to Portsmouth, New Hampshire.
Stettin	Stettin	The steamship foundered whilst on a voyage from Lübzin, Prussia to Stettin with the loss of about 30 lives.
William and Henry Tomlinson	United Kingdom	The ship ran aground off Islay. She was on a voyage from Newcastle upon Tyne, Northumberland to Waterford. She was refloated and resumed her voyage.

== 11 October ==
List of shipwrecks: 11 October 1842
Ship	State	Description
Forrest	United Kingdom	The ship was abandoned in the Atlantic Ocean. Her crew were rescued by Alice Jane (United Kingdom). Forrest was on a voyage from Portland, Dorset to Havana, Cuba.
Jackson	United Kingdom	The ship was wrecked on the west coast of Gotland, Sweden with the loss of five of her eleven crew. She was on a voyage from Saint Petersburg, Russia to London.
Return	United Kingdom	The ship was in collision with Apollo (United Kingdom) and was consequently beached at Bamburgh, Northumberland. She was on a voyage from South Shields, County Durham to Leith, Lothian.
Robert Pringle	United Kingdom	The ship was driven ashore on Mew Island, County Down. She was on a voyage from Portrush to Liverpool, Lancashire. She was refloated and taken into Donaghadee.

== 12 October ==
List of shipwrecks: 12 October 1842
Ship	State	Description
Brigand	United Kingdom	The paddle steamer struck the Bishop Rock, off the Isles of Scilly and consequently foundered 7 nautical miles (13 km) off the rock. Her 27 crew survived. She was on a voyage from Liverpool, Lancashire to London.
Burmah	Norway	The ship ran aground and was severely damaged at Whitby, Yorkshire, United Kingdom. She was on a voyage from Bergen to Stockholm, Sweden.
Eliza	Belgium	The brig sprang a leak and foundered in the Atlantic Ocean (50°13′N 11°04′W). Her crew were rescued by Sir Walter Scott (United Kingdom). Eliza was on a voyage from "Villa Nova" Portugal to Antwerp.
Ewald and Bertha	Denmark	The ship sprang a leak and sank in the Dogger Bank. Her crew were rescued. She was on a voyage from London to Saint Petersburg, Russia.
Fame	United Kingdom	The ship was driven ashore near "Sackenhoff". She was on a voyage from Dundee, Forfarshire to Riga, Russia.
Gaspee	United States	The ship was wrecked on Gotland. Her crew were rescued. She was on a voyage from Saint Petersburg to Boston, Massachusetts.
Gratitude	United Kingdom	The ship was driven ashore at St. Monans, Fife. She was on a voyage from Arkhangelsk, Russia to Kirkcaldy, Fife.
Henry Volant	United Kingdom	The schooner was driven ashore at Ballyshannon, County Donegal. She was on a voyage from Quebec City, Province of Canada, British North America to Ballyshannon.
Jena	France	The ship was dismasted and abandoned in the Atlantic Ocean. Her crew were rescued. She was on a voyage from Tampico, Mexico to Havre de Grâce, Seine-Inférieure.
Scipio	United Kingdom	The ship was wrecked at Hirtshals, Denmark. Her crew were rescued. She was on a voyage from London to a Baltic port.
Sunda	United Kingdom	The ship was wrecked on Hainan, China with much loss of life.
Thomas and Robert Jackson	United Kingdom	The brig ran aground on the Haisborough Sands, in the North Sea off the coast of Norfolk and sank. Her crew were rescued by the Barking smack Clown (United Kingdom); her captain by the Winterton Lifeboat. Thomas and Robert Jackson was on a voyage from Middlesbrough, Yorkshire to London.

== 13 October ==
List of shipwrecks: 13 October 1842
Ship	State	Description
Belle	United Kingdom	The ship, which had struck a reef off Gotland, Sweden on or before 12 October and been abandoned, foundered 14 nautical miles (26 km) off Gotland.
Fawn	United Kingdom	The schooner was damaged by fire at Peterhead, Aberdeenshire.
James	United Kingdom	The ship was driven ashore in the River Mersey. She was on a voyage from Liverpool, Lancashire to Lisbon, Portugal.
Pryde	United Kingdom	The ship ran aground on a reef off Domesnes, Norway. She was on a voyage from Newcastle upon Tyne, Northumberland to Riga, Russia. Pryde was later refloated.
William Henry Angas	United Kingdom	The ship was driven ashore at Krasnaya Gorka, Russia. She was on a voyage from Newcastle upon Tyne to Saint Petersburg. She was refloated and completed her voyage.

== 14 October ==
List of shipwrecks: 14 October 1842
Ship	State	Description
Electra	United Kingdom	The ship was driven ashore on Læsø, Denmark. She was on a voyage from London to Stockholm, Sweden. She was later refloated.
Eliza Helen	Kingdom of Hanover	The ship ran aground off Dragør, Denmark and was wrecked.
Essex	United Kingdom	The West Indiaman lost her rudder and was abandoned in the Atlantic Ocean. Her crew were rescued by a Neopolitan brig. She was on a voyage from Jamaica to London. Essex was taken in tow by Beaujeau (France), which intended to take her into Havre de Grâce, Seine-Inférieure, but she was subsequently abandoned at the entrance to the English Channel. She was subsequently discovered by Pauline Houghton and was taken into Crookhaven, County Cork, where she arrived on 5 November.
Idogheten	Denmark	The ship collided with Wesley (United Kingdom) and foundered off Öland, Sweden. Her crew were rescued by Wesley.
Jane and Maria	United Kingdom	The schooner was in collision with Sovereign (United Kingdom) off the Bullers of Buchan, Aberdeenshire and was severely damaged. She was towed into Aberdeen by Sovereign.
Spring	United Kingdom	The ship was wrecked on Gotland, Sweden. Her crew were rescued. She was on a voyage from Sunderland, County Durham to Saint Petersburg, Russia.

== 15 October ==
List of shipwrecks: 15 October 1842
Ship	State	Description
Antelope	(United Kingdom of Great Britain and Ireland) British North America	The ship was wrecked at the mouth of the Grand River.
Argyll	United Kingdom	The barque was driven ashore near Louisbourg, Nova Scotia, British North America with the loss of all sixteen crew. She was on a voyage from Dublin to Halifax, Nova Scotia.
E. M. Treadwell	(United Kingdom of Great Britain and Ireland) British North America	The ship was wrecked on Cape Breton Island, Nova Scotia. Her crew were rescued. She was on a voyage from Marseille, Bouches-du-Rhône, France to Sydney, Nova Scotia.
Forester	United Kingdom	The ship ran aground on Neckman's Ground, in the Baltic Sea, and sank. Her crew were rescued. She was on a voyage from South Shields, County Durham to Saint Petersburg, Russia.
Horizon	United Kingdom	The ship was driven ashore in Narva Bay. Her crew were rescued. She was on a voyage from Liverpool, Lancashire to Saint Petersburg.
Kirby	United Kingdom	The ship was in collision with Dundonald (United Kingdom) and foundered with the loss of all but one of her crew. She was on a voyage from the River Duddon to Youghal, County Cork.
Mic Mac	(United Kingdom of Great Britain and Ireland) British North America	The ship was driven ashore at Gaspé, Province of Canada.
Minerva	United Kingdom	The ship was driven ashore in Mall Bay.
Swan	United Kingdom	The ship ran aground in the Swine Bottoms and was wrecked. She was on a voyage from Stettin to Rochester, Kent.
Thilda	Sweden	The ship was driven ashore at Copenhagen, Denmark. She was on a voyage from Porto, Portugal to Gothenburg. She was refloated on 25 October.

== 16 October ==
List of shipwrecks: 16 October 1842
Ship	State	Description
Matilda	Netherlands	The ship ran aground on the Brake Sand, in the North Sea off the coast of Kent, United Kingdom. She was refloated and taken into Ramsgate, Kent.
Pomerania	Prussia	The ship was driven ashore at Hjørring, Denmark. Her crew were rescued. She was on a voyage from London, United Kingdom to Wolgast.
Snowball	United Kingdom	The ship was wrecked on Salt Island, Connecticut, United States. She was on a voyage from Westport, Connecticut, to Portsmouth, Hampshire.
Union	Russia	The ship was driven ashore at Frederikshavn, Denmark. She was on a voyage from Cádiz, Spain to Vyborg.

== 17 October ==
List of shipwrecks: 17 October 1842
Ship	State	Description
Argyle	(United Kingdom of Great Britain and Ireland) British North America	The ship was driven ashore and wrecked at Roger's Harbour, Newfoundland. Her crew were rescued.
Margaret and Ellen	United Kingdom	The ship was run down and sunk in the North Sea 4 nautical miles (7.4 km) north of Whitby, Yorkshire by Despatch (United Kingdom) with the loss of two of her four crew. Margaret and Ellen was on a voyage from Crail, Fife to London.
Nedro	United Kingdom	The ship struck the Whitby Rock. She was on a voyage from Sunderland, County Durham to Whitby. Nedro was refloated and taken into Whitby in a sinking condition.
Ville de Rochefort	France	The ship ran aground off Comarca Lagunera, Mexico and was holed. She was beached and was subsequently condemned.

== 18 October ==
List of shipwrecks: 18 October 1842
Ship	State	Description
Betsey Ann Deas	United Kingdom	The schooner was wrecked at Eyemouth, Berwickshire. All on board were rescued. She was on a voyage from Newcastle upon Tyne, Northumberland to Dundee, Forfarshire.
Economy	United Kingdom	The ship was run down by a brig off Whitby, Yorkshire. Her crew were rescued.
Fawn	United Kingdom	The schooner was destroyed by fire at Peterhead, Aberdeenshire.
James	United Kingdom	The schooner was driven ashore at Emanuel Head, Northumberland. She was on a voyage from Grangemouth, Stirlingshire to Newcastle upon Tyne. She was refloated and resumed her voyage
Lusitania	United Kingdom	The ship departed from Porto, Portugal for St. John's, Newfoundland, British North America. No further trace, presumed foundered in the Atlantic Ocean with the loss of all hands.
Minerva	United Kingdom	The ship was wrecked in Poverty Bay.
Poland	United Kingdom	The ship ran aground at Portsmouth, Hampshire. She was on a voyage from Portsmouth to Sunderland, County Durham.
Sarah	United Kingdom	The ship was driven ashore on the Stone Ridge. She was on a voyage from Sunderland to Stonehaven, Aberdeenshire. She was refloated and taken into Lindisfarne, Northumberland.
Three Sisters	United Kingdom	The ship was driven ashore at Robin Hoods Bay, Yorkshire and was abandoned by her crew. They were rescued by Nancy (United Kingdom).

== 19 October ==
List of shipwrecks: 19 October 1842
Ship	State	Description
Industry	United Kingdom	The ship was driven ashore and damaged at Robin Hoods Bay, Yorkshire. She was refloated on 28 October.
Jane Augusta	United Kingdom	The ship ran aground at Liverpool, Lancashire. She was on a voyage from Quebec City, Province of Canada, British North America to Liverpool.
Orient	United Kingdom	The schooner ran aground on the Herd Sand, in the North Sea off the coast of County Durham. She was refloated and taken into South Shields, County Durham.
Swift	United Kingdom	The ship was driven ashore at Point Levy, Province of Canada. She was on a voyage from Quebec City to Sunderland, County Durham. Swift was refloated.

== 20 October ==
List of shipwrecks: 20 October 1842
Ship	State	Description
Havre	United States	The ship was destroyed by fire at Bordeaux, Gironde, France.
Mary	United Kingdom	The ship ran aground on the Bembridge Ledge, off the Isle of Wight. She was on a voyage from London to Bedhampton, Hampshire. She was refloated.
Schaw	(United Kingdom of Great Britain and Ireland) Van Diemen's Land	The schooner was wrecked in the Browns River with the loss of three lives.
Water Nymph	United Kingdom	The schooner ran aground on the Long Sand, in the North Sea off the coast of Essex and sank. She was on a voyage from South Shields, County Durham to Dunkirk, Nord, France.

== 21 October ==
List of shipwrecks: 21 October 1842
Ship	State	Description
Adeline	United Kingdom	The brig was driven ashore and wrecked at Shag Harbour, Nova Scotia, British North America. She was on a voyage from Dublin to Yarmouth, Nova Scotia.
Friends	United Kingdom	The ship foundered in the Irish Sea off the coast of Cumberland.
Howard	United States	The ship ran aground on the Abscom Shoal. She was on a voyage from Hamburg to New York. Howard was refloated and resumed her voyage.
Mayflower	(United Kingdom of Great Britain and Ireland) Jersey	The ship capsized at Bridport, Dorset. She was righted.
North America	United Kingdom	The steamship was severely damaged by fire at Boston, Massachusetts, United States.
William	United Kingdom	The ship struck rocks at Alexandria, Egypt and was damaged. She was on a voyage from Malta to Alexandria.

== 22 October ==
List of shipwrecks: 22 October 1842
Ship	State	Description
Anne and Helen	United Kingdom	The ship ran aground on the Sheringham Shoal, in the North Sea off the coast of Norfolk and sank. Her crew were rescued by Kate (United Kingdom). Anne and Helen was on a voyage from London to Berwick upon Tweed, Northumberland.
Belhaven	United Kingdom	The ship was driven ashore at Saltcoats, Ayrshire. Her crew were rescued by the Ardrossan Lifeboat.
City of Jerusalem	United Kingdom	The sailing barge sank at Harwich, Essex. Her crew were rescued.
Comte de Flandres	(Belgium) Belgian Navy	The 18-gun brig was driven onto the Goodwin Sands, Kent, United Kingdom. She was later refloated and put into Ramsgate, Kent for repairs.
Coronation	United Kingdom	The ship was driven ashore at Thorpeness, Suffolk. She was on a voyage from Sunderland, County Durham to London. She was refloated and resumed her voyage.
Cygnet	United Kingdom	The ship was driven ashore at Flamborough Head, Yorkshire. She was on a voyage from Dover, Kent to Stockton-on-Tees, County Durham. Cygnet was refloated on 24 October.
Felice Rosso	Kingdom of Sardinia	The brig was driven ashore between Deal and Walmer Castle, Kent. She was later refloated with assistance from the steamship Royal George (United Kingdom) and taken into Ramsgate.
Flora	United Kingdom	The schooner foundered in St Ives Bay. She was on a voyage from Hayle, Cornwall to Llanelly, Glamorgan.
Friends	United Kingdom	The brig foundered in the Bristol Channel with the loss of all hands.
Hope	United Kingdom	The barque was wrecked on the Goodwin Sands. Her crew were rescued by Tartar (United Kingdom). She was on a voyage from Rimouski, Province of Canada, British North America to London.
Mandingo	United Kingdom	The brig was driven ashore between Deal and Walmer Castle. A would-be rescuer was drowned when his boat capsized. She was on a voyage from London to Jamaica. Mandingo was later refloated with assistance from the steamship Royal George (United Kingdom) and taken into Ramsgate.
Margaret	United Kingdom	The ship ran aground at Stromness, Orkney Islands. She was on a voyage from Arkhangelsk, Russia to the Clyde.
Maria	Belgium	The ship was wrecked on the Kattendijk. She was on a voyage from London to Brussels.
Mary	United Kingdom	The ship was driven ashore at Flamborough Head. She was refloated and resumed her voyage.
Morgan	United Kingdom	The brig foundered in St. Ives Bay with the loss of all hands.. She was on a voyage from Hayle, Cornwall to Tenby, Pembrokeshire.
Nancy	United Kingdom	The barque was wrecked on the Goodwin Sands with the loss of all hands.
Nanny	United Kingdom	The sloop was driven ashore and sank at Burntisland, Fife. She was on a voyage from East Wemyss, Fife to the Moray Firth.
Sir Walter Scott	United Kingdom	The ship was driven ashore at Deal. She was on a voyage from Quebec City, Province of Canada to London. She was later refloated.
Venice	United Kingdom	The ship was driven ashore between Deal and Walmer Castle. She was on a voyage from London to Genoa, Kingdom of Sardinia. Venice was refloated and taken into Ramsgate.

== 23 October ==
List of shipwrecks: 23 October 1842
Ship	State	Description
Beverley	(United Kingdom of Great Britain and Ireland) Guernsey	The brig was driven ashore and wrecked at Lydd, Kent. She was on a voyage from Guernsey to London.
Bolivar	United Kingdom	The ship was driven ashore at Passage West, County Cork. She floated off the next day.
Cana Baba	United Kingdom	The schooner ran aground on the Great Burbo Bank, in Liverpool Bay. Her crew were rescued. She was on a voyage from Senegal to Liverpool, Lancashire. She was refloated on 3 November and towed into the River Mersey in a capsized condition.
Dorade	France	The ship departed from Martinique of Saint Pierre and Miquelon. No further trace, presumed foundered with the loss of all hands.
Dorothea	France	The ship was driven ashore at "Cronborg", Denmark. She was on a voyage from Riga, Russia to Dunkirk, Nord. She was later refloated and taken into Cronborg.
Endeavour	United Kingdom	The sloop was driven into Alice (United Kingdom) and sank at Fishguard, Pembrokeshire. She was on a voyage from Barrow-in-Furness, Cumberland to Cardiff, Glamorgan.
Hopewell	United Kingdom	The ship sprang a leak and sank at Selby, Yorkshire.
Ilmari	Spain	The ship ran aground on the Goodwin Sands, Kent, United Kingdom and was abandoned by her crew. She was on a voyage from Cádiz to Bogø, Denmark. Ilmari was later refloated and taken into The Downs.
Rebecca and Eliza	United Kingdom	The brig was driven ashore and wrecked at Lydd. Her crew were rescued by a Coast Guard lugger. She was on a voyage from Rouen, Seine-Inférieure to Newcastle upon Tyne, Northumberland. Rebecca and Eliza was refloated on 5 November and taken into Rye, Sussex.
Saumon	France	The ship was driven ashore and wrecked at Vauville, Calvados.
Timbuctoo	United Kingdom	The brig was driven ashore at Port Isaac, Cornwall. Her fourteen crew were rescued. She was on a voyage from Africa to Bristol, Gloucestershire. She was refloated on 29 October and beached.
Victorine	France	The brig was wrecked near Havre de Grâce, Seine-Inférieure. Her crew were rescued. She was on a voyage from Marseille, Bouches-du-Rhône to Rouen, Seine-Inférieure.
William Wilberforce	United Kingdom	The ship was driven ashore 3 nautical miles (5.6 km) from Ilfracombe, Devon with the loss of all ten crew. She was refloated on 15 November and taken into Ilfracombe.

== 24 October ==
List of shipwrecks: 24 October 1842
Ship	State	Description
Antoinette	France	The full-rigged ship departed from Pondicherry, India. No further trace, presumed foundered with the loss of all hands.
Apollon	France	The full-rigged ship departed from Pondicherry. No further trace, presumed foundered with the loss of all hands.
Arethusa	United Kingdom	The ship was driven ashore and wrecked south of Madras, India. Her crew were rescued.
Auspicious	United Kingdom	The ship was wrecked on the coast of Cumberland.
Betsey	United Kingdom	The schooner was driven ashore and wrecked near Eyemouth, Berwickshire. All on board were rescued. She was on a voyage from Newcastle upon Tyne, Northumberland to Dundee, Forfarshire.
Bosphorus	United Kingdom	The ship was driven ashore at Hayle, Cornwall. She was on a voyage from Glasgow, Renfrewshire to Jamaica.
Britannia	United Kingdom	The ship was driven ashore in the Bay of Fiume. She was on a voyage from Fiume, Austrian Empire to Antwerp, Belgium.
Castor and Pollux	United Kingdom	The ship was driven ashore north of Helsingør, Denmark. She was on a voyage from Wexford to Rostock. She was refloated and taken into Helsingør.
Cervantes	France	The ship was damaged at Pondicherry, India.
Corsair	Netherlands	The ship departed from Pondicherry. No further trace, presumed foundered with the loss of all hands.
Couna Baba	France	The schooner was wrecked on the Burbo Bank, in Liverpool Bay. Her seven crew were rescued by HMS Medina (Royal Navy). She was on a voyage from Senegal to Liverpool, Lancashire, United Kingdom. Couna Baba was refloated on 2 November and towed into the River Mersey in a capsized condition.
Elizabeth	United Kingdom	The ship was driven ashore on St. Michael's Mount, Cornwall.
Elizabeth	United Kingdom	The ship was driven ashore at Coatham, Yorkshire. Her crew were rescued. She was on a voyage from Whitby, Yorkshire to South Shields, County Durham.
Ellen and Ann	United Kingdom	The ship was wrecked on the Sheringham Shoal, in the North Sea off the coast of Norfolk. Her crew were rescued.
Emerald	United Kingdom	The ship was severely damaged at Madras. She was consequently condemned.
Francis Smith	United Kingdom	The ship was wrecked at Madras with the loss of sixteen lives.
Ganges	United Kingdom	The ship was driven ashore and wrecked south of Madras.
Greenwell	United Kingdom	The ship was driven ashore in the Zuyder Zee. She was on a voyage from Sunderland, County Durham to Amsterdam, North Holland, Netherlands. She was later refloated.
Highlander	United Kingdom	The ship was driven ashore and wrecked south of Madras with the loss of a crew member.
Mirabeau	France	The ship was damaged at Pondicherry.
New Times	United Kingdom	The schooner was destroyed by an explosion off Badagry, Africa with the loss of all twelve crew.
Nouveau Tropique	France	The ship was damaged at Pondicherry.
Restigouche	United Kingdom	The ship was wrecked near "Bronitz". Her crew were rescued. She was on a voyage from Gibraltar to Bilbao, Spain.
Ruby	United Kingdom	The ship was wrecked near Sadras, India. She was on a voyage from Colombo, Ceylon to Calcutta, India.
Saumon	France	The ship was driven ashore and wrecked at Vauville, Manche.
Susan	United Kingdom	The ship was driven ashore on Fogo Island, Newfoundland, British North America.
Ten	United Kingdom	The ship was driven ashore and wrecked south of Madras. Her crew were rescued.
Theresia	France	The ship was wrecked on the Île d'Oléron, Seine-Inférieure with the loss of all hands. She was on a voyage from Bordeaux, Gironde to Brussels, Belgium. She was refloated on 5 November and taken into Le Verdon-sur-Mer, Gironde.
Thomas and Eliza	United Kingdom	The ship was wrecked on the coast of Cumberland.
Union	United Kingdom	The ship was driven ashore on St Michael's Mount.

== 25 October ==
List of shipwrecks: 25 October 1842
Ship	State	Description
Betsey	United Kingdom	The ship ran aground at St. Mary's, Isles of Scilly. She was on a voyage from Girgenti, Sicily to Liverpool, Lancashire. She was refloated and resumed her voyage.
Don	United Kingdom	The ship struck the Newcombe Sand, in the North Sea off the coast of Norfolk and sank. Her crew were rescued. She was on a voyage from Stockton-on-Tees, County Durham to London.
Emma	United Kingdom	The smack was driven ashore on Sker Point, Glamorgan. She was refloated on 1 November and put into Swansea, Glamorgan.
Fanny	United Kingdom	The ship ran aground on the Holm Sand. She was on a voyage from Hull, Yorkshire to Saint Petersburg, Russia. She was refloated on 28 October and resumed her voyage.
Linnet	United Kingdom	The schooner was wrecked at Portmahomack, Ross-shire. Her four crew were rescued. She was on a voyage from Macduff, Aberdeenshire to Campbeltown, Argyllshire
Sisters	United Kingdom	The ship was abandoned. Her crew were rescued. She was on a voyage from the Gambia River to London.
Washington	United Kingdom	The ship was abandoned in the Indian Ocean 340 nautical miles (630 km) off Madras, India. All on board were rescued by Sir Robert Peel (United Kingdom). Washington was on a voyage from Madras to London.
Watts	United Kingdom	The barque was wrecked on the Boulder Bank, in the English Channel off Eastbourne, Sussex. Her seven crew were rescued by the Eastbourne Lifeboat. Watts was refloated on 31 October and towed into Portsmouth, Hampshire. She had been on a voyage from Quebec City, Province of Canada to Plymouth, Devon.

== 26 October ==
List of shipwrecks: 26 October 1842
Ship	State	Description
Ann	United Kingdom	The brig was wrecked at Madeira.
Argyle	United Kingdom	The ship was lost off Halifax, Nova Scotia, British North America with the loss of all seventeen crew.
Creole	United States	The brig was driven ashore and wrecked at Funchal, Madeira. Her crew were rescued.
Crusade	United Kingdom	The ship was wrecked at Madeira.
Dart	United Kingdom	Novo Beijinho (left) and Dart (right). The schooner was driven ashore and wrecked at Funchal. Her crew were rescued.
Didrik Cappelen	Norway	The ship ran aground on the "Waderoarn" and was wrecked. Her crew were rescued. She was on a voyage from Honfleur, Calvados, France to Skien.
Dolphin	(United Kingdom of Great Britain and Ireland) British North America	The schooner was wrecked near St. Mary's, Nova Scotia. Her crew were rescued. She was on a voyage from Sydney, Nova Scotia to Halifax, Nova Scotia.
Eliza	United Kingdom	The ship was driven ashore and severely damaged at L'Etete, New Brunswick, British North America. She was later refloated.
Fanny	United Kingdom	The ship ran aground on the Holm Sand. She was on a voyage from Hull, Yorkshire to Saint Petersburg, Russia.
Frederick	Netherlands	The ship was driven ashore and wrecked at Wainfleet, Lincolnshire, United Kingdom. Her crew were rescued. She was on a voyage from Amsterdam, North Holland to South Shields, County Durham, United Kingdom.
Fair Trader	United Kingdom	The ship struck a rock off Halifax and foundered. Her crew survived. She was on a voyage from Liverpool, Nova Scotia to St. Mary's, Newfoundland.
Gloria Madre Esperanza	Kingdom of Sardinia	The polacca was driven ashore and wrecked east of Funchal with the loss of all hands.
Leonora	France	The ship was lost off Sciotots, Manche.
Liberty	United Kingdom	The ship was driven ashore and wrecked at Southport, Lancashire. Her crew were rescued. She was on a voyage from Poole, Dorset to Liverpool, Lancashire.
Mona	United Kingdom	The ship was driven ashore at Maryport, Cumberland. She was on a voyage from Dublin to Maryport. She was later refloated and taken into Maryport.
Novo Beijinho	Portugal	The schooner was driven ashore and wrecked at Funchal with the loss of four of her crew.
Ocean	United Kingdom	The ship was driven ashore at Maryport. She was refloated on 31 October and taken into Maryport.
Queen of Trumps	United Kingdom	The sloop was driven ashore between Formby and Southport. Her crew were rescued. She was on a voyage from Dublin to Liverpool.
Robert Burns	United Kingdom	The ship was driven ashore and wrecked 10 nautical miles (19 km) west of Tobermory, Mull, Outer Hebrides. Her crew were rescued.
Robert Raikes	United Kingdom	The brig foundered in the North Sea off Husum, Duchy of Schleswig. Her crew were rescued. She was on a voyage from Sunderland, County Durham to Hamburg.
Romulus	United Kingdom	The ship was driven ashore on Madeira. Her crew were rescued.
Sophia	(United Kingdom of Great Britain and Ireland) British North America	The ship struck a rock off St. Mary's, Nova Scotia and was wrecked. Her crew were rescued. She was on a voyage from Sydney, Nova Scotia to Halifax.
Thomas	United Kingdom	The ship was driven ashore near Southport. Her crew were rescued. She was on a voyage from Dundalk, County Louth to Liverpool.
Venus	United Kingdom	The ship was driven ashore at Maryport. She was on a voyage from Belfast, County Antrim to Maryport. Venus was refloated on 31 October and taken into Maryport.
Wave	(United Kingdom of Great Britain and Ireland) Jersey	The schooner was driven ashore and wrecked at Funchal. Her crew were rescued.
William and James	United Kingdom	The ship was driven ashore at Whitehaven, Cumberland.

== 27 October ==
List of shipwrecks: 27 October 1842
Ship	State	Description
Adamant	United Kingdom	The ship was wrecked on the Hinderbank, in the North Sea. Her crew were rescued. She was on a voyage from Liverpool, Lancashire to Rotterdam, South Holland, Netherlands.
Echo	United Kingdom	The brig was wrecked on the Cannon Rocks, off the coast of County Down with the loss of four of her seven crew. Survivors were rescued by the Coast Guard. Echo was on a voyage from Dublin to Newcastle upon Tyne, Northumberland.
George	United Kingdom	The ship was driven ashore at Port Gaverne, Cornwall. She was on a voyage from Liverpool to Jersey, Channel Islands. George was refloated on 1 November and taken into Padstow, Cornwall.
Georgiana	United Kingdom	The ship struck a sunken rock and foundered off the coast of Portugal. Her crew were rescued. She was on a voyage from Tarragona, Spain to Liverpool.
Hannah	United Kingdom	The ship was driven ashore at Berwick upon Tweed, Northumberland. She was later refloated.
Harmony	United Kingdom	The East Indiaman was wrecked with the loss of four of her crew. She was on a voyage from London to Bombay, India.
Heliae	Spain	The ship foundered in the Atlantic Ocean (55°20′N 35°00′W). Her crew were rescued by Orbicular (United Kingdom). Heliae was on a voyage from Bergen, Norway to Bilbao.
Hope	United Kingdom	The schooner foundered in the North Channel. Her crew were rescued.
Keltic	United Kingdom	The ship caught fire in the North Sea whilst on a voyage from Beadnell, Northumberland to Dundee, Forfarshire. She was towed into Warkworth, Northumberland where she burnt out.
Maria	United Kingdom	The schooner was abandoned in the North Sea 75 nautical miles (139 km) west by north of Flamborough Head, Yorkshire. Her eight crew were rescued by Charlotte (United Kingdom) Maria was on a voyage from Portsmouth, Hampshire to Sunderland, County Durham. She was discovered in a capsized condition 120 nautical miles (220 km) off Heligoland on 31 October by Rob Roy (United Kingdom). She was righted and towed into Hamburg.
Medora	United Kingdom	The ship ran aground on the Haisborough Sands, in the North Sea off the coast of Norfolk. She was on a voyage from Galata, Ottoman Empire to Hull, Yorkshire. She was refloated with assistance from the fishing lugger William and Sarah (United Kingdom) and taken into Great Yarmouth.
Peggy	United Kingdom	The ship was driven ashore and wrecked at Berwick upon Tweed. She was on a voyage from Burntisland, Fife to North Sunderland, County Durham.

== 28 October ==
List of shipwrecks: 28 October 1842
Ship	State	Description
Helia	Spain	The schooner foundered in the North Sea (55°20′N 0°35′E). Her twelve crew were rescued by Orbicular (United Kingdom). Helia was on a voyage from Bergen, Norway to Bilbao.
Louisa	(United Kingdom of Great Britain and Ireland) British North America	The ship was wrecked on Cape Sable Island, Nova Scotia. Her crew were rescued. She was on a voyage from "Barin" to Halifax, Nova Scotia.
Sally	United Kingdom	The ship struck a sunken wreck in the North Sea off the coast of Essex. She was consequently beached on the Maplin Sand, where she sank. Sally was on a voyage from Perth to London.

== 29 October ==
List of shipwrecks: 29 October 1842
Ship	State	Description
Adahlina	United Kingdom	The ship an aground on the Cross Sand, in the North Sea off the coast of Norfolk. She was refloated and taken into Great Yarmouth in a leaky condition.
Anna and Carlotta	Hamburg	The ship departed from Rio de Janeiro, Brazil for Hamburg. No further trace, presumed foundered with the loss of all hands.
Aurora	(United Kingdom of Great Britain and Ireland) Jersey	The brigantine was driven ashore at Gibraltar.
Eight	United Kingdom	The brig foundered in the Atlantic Ocean 70 nautical miles (130 km) west of Tarifa, Spain. Her crew were rescued. She was on a voyage from Alexandria, Egypt to Liverpool, Lancashire.
Emmanuel	France	The brig was driven ashore and wrecked at Gibraltar with the loss of a crew member.
Letitia	France	The brig was driven ashore and wrecked at Gibraltar with the loss of eight lives.
Peter and Wilhelm	Denmark	The ship ran aground on the Steingrund. She was on a voyage from Stege to Havre de Grâce, Seine-Inférieure. She was refloated and taken into Nyborg.
Sir William Wallace	United Kingdom	The ship was driven ashore on Læsø, Denmark. She was on a voyage from Riga, Russia to London. She was refloated and taken into Helsingør, Denmark.
Trois Frères	France	The ship was driven ashore and wrecked on Walcheren, Zeeland, Netherlands. She was on a voyage from Adra, Spain to Dunkirk, Nord.

== 30 October ==
List of shipwrecks: 30 October 1842
Ship	State	Description
Breeze	United Kingdom	The ship was driven ashore at Bermuda. She was on a voyage from Halifax, Nova Scotia, British North America to Beruda.
Ida	Sweden	The ship was wrecked near Laholm. She was on a voyage from Kalmar to Hull, Yorkshire, United Kingdom.
Johanna Frederika	Hamburg	The ship departed from Liverpool, Lancashire, United Kingdom for Stettin. No further trace, presumed foundered with the loss of all hands.
Orion	United Kingdom	The schooner was driven ashore and severely damaged at Wells-next-the-Sea, Norfolk. She was refloated on 3 November and taken into Wells-next-the-Sea.
Senegal	France	The brig was abandoned in the Atlantic Ocean 200 nautical miles (370 km) west of the Azores. Her crew were rescued by Swan (United Kingdom).
Severn	United Kingdom	The ship was wrecked at Princeton, Newfoundland, British North America. Her crew were rescued.
Three Sisters	United Kingdom	The sloop was driven ashore at Burnham Overy Staithe, Norfolk.
Triton	United Kingdom	The brig was wrecked on the Kentish Knock. She was on a voyage from South Shields, County Durham to Marseille, Bouches-du-Rhône.
Trinidad Packet	(United Kingdom of Great Britain and Ireland) Trinidad	The sloop ran aground on the Kettle Bottom. She was on a voyage from Trinidad to Barbados. She was refloated on 7 November.
Washington	United States	The ship ran aground on the Old Man Shoal, in the Atlantic Ocean off the coast of Massachusetts. She was on a voyage from Havana, Cuba to Bremen. She was refloated and put into Boston, Massachusetts.

== 31 October ==
List of shipwrecks: 31 October 1842
Ship	State	Description
Brothers	United States	The ship was abandoned in the Atlantic Ocean. Her crew were rescued by Lady Harvey (United Kingdom). Brothers was on a voyage from Boston, Massachusetts, to Pernambuco, Brazil.
Dove	United Kingdom	The ship was driven ashore and wrecked at Waarde, Zeeland, Netherlands. Her crew were rescued. She was on a voyage from Cardiff, Glamorgan to Stettin.
Gustaf I	Sweden	The ship was wrecked on the Lysgrund, off Hesselø, Denmark. Her crew were rescued. She was on a voyage from Lisbon, Portugal to Varberg.
Letitia	France	The brig was wrecked near the Castle of Sancti Petri, Spain with the loss of eight lives.
Louisa	Russia	The ship was in collision with the brig Revanche ( Sweden) and was abandoned in the North Sea 7 nautical miles (13 km) off Orfordness, Suffolk, United Kingdom. Her crew were rescued. She was on a voyage from Saint Petersburg to Nantes, Loire-Inférieure, France. Louisa was towed into Gravesend, Kent, United Kingdom by Caledonia (United Kingdom). She arrived on 4 November.
Margaretha Cornelia	Netherlands	The ship collided with Franz ( Stettin) in the Baltic Sea and was abandoned by her crew. She was on a voyage from Königsberg, Prussia to Amsterdam, North Holland.
Ostser	Prussia	The ship was driven ashore at Streckelsberg. She was on a voyage from Liverpool, Lancashire, United Kingdom to Stettin. Ostser was refloated.

== Unknown date ==
List of shipwrecks: Unknown date in October 1842
Ship	State	Description
Adele Cæline	France	The ship was abandoned in the Mediterranean Sea off Cape de Gatt, Spain before 21 October.
Alice	United States	The ship was driven ashore at Key West, Florida Territory.
Alsthorpe	United Kingdom	The ship was driven ashore in Boylach Bay. She was on a voyage from Saint John, New Brunswick, British North America to Dundalk, County Louth. She was later refloated and taken into "Routliff".
Augustine	Peru	The schooner was blown out to sea from "Mazathan". No further trace, presumed foundered.
Aurora	United Kingdom	The ship was in collision with Susan ( (United Kingdom of Great Britain and Ireland) Jersey) and was beached at El Puerto de Santa María, Spain.
Auspicious	United Kingdom	The ship foundered in the Bristol Channel off Bideford, Devon.
Bell	United Kingdom	The ship struck a rock and sank off Fårö, Sweden. Her crew were rescued. She was on a voyage from Saint Petersburg, Russia to Hull, Yorkshire.
Cane Grove	United Kingdom	The ship was driven ashore on Hogland, Russia. she was later refloated.
Clarence	United Kingdom	The ship was wrecked at "St. George's Harbour", on the Danube.
Cleostratus	United Kingdom	The barque was abandoned at sea. Her crew were rescued by Petite Anna (France). She was on a voyage from Shediac, Nova Scotia, British North America to Greenock, Renfrewshire. Cleostratus was subsequently driven ashore near Pictou, Nova Scotia. She had been refloated by 10 October and taken into Shediac.
Cuba	United Kingdom	The brig foundered in the Atlantic Ocean with the loss of all hands. She was on a voyage from a port in the Republic of Texas to New York City, United States.
Douglas	United States	The brig was abandoned at sea. Her crew were rescued by Maitland (United Kingdom). She was on a voyage from Caernarfon, United Kingdom to Boston, Massachusetts.
Dumesnil	France	The brig was driven ashore east of Málaga, Spain before 28 October. She was refloated on 31 October.
Eliza	United States	The steamboat struck a submerged object and sank in the Mississippi River 4 nautical miles (7.4 km) upstream of the confluence of the Ohio River with the loss of 20-40 lives.
Elizabeth	United Kingdom	The ship was driven ashore whilst on a voyage from Plymouth, Devon to Liverpool, Lancashire. She was refloated and put into Caernarfon, where she arrived on 24 October.
Ellida	Sweden	The ship was wrecked near Gräsö. Her crew were rescued.
Emmanuel	France	The ship was driven ashore and wrecked at Cape Condor, near Rota, Spain. She was on a voyage from Newfoundland, British North America to Cette, Hérault.
Familien	Norway	The ship was abandoned in the Atlantic Ocean off the coast of Finistère, France before 10 October. She was on a voyage from St. Ubes, Portugal to Bergen. Familien was taken into a port near Brest.
Francis Lord	(United States) Florida Territory	The brig was wrecked at the mouth of the Indian River. Her crew were murdered.
Hermes	Netherlands	The ship ran aground on the Freshland Flats. She was on a voyage from Riga, Russia to Amsterdam, North Holland. She was refloated and taken into the "Pampas", where she arrived on 2 October.
Jersey	United Kingdom	The ship was destroyed by fire at Calcutta, India.
John	United Kingdom	The ship was driven ashore at Great Yarmouth, Norfolk. She was on a voyage from Newcastle upon Tyne, Northumberland to Southampton, Hampshire. John was refloated on 14 October and resumed her voyage.
John Quincy Adams	United States	The schooner was driven ashore and wrecked in Chaleur Bay.
Kron Prinsen	Norway	The ship collided with Froya (Russia) and foundered in the North Sea. Her crew were rescued by Froya. Kron Prinsen was on a voyage from Bergen to Antwerp, Belgium.
Lavoisier	France	The steamship was driven ashore on the coast of Corsica.
Majestic	United States	The schooner was driven ashore in Chaleur Bay.
Margaret and Ellen	United Kingdom	The ship was in collision with Despatch and foundered in the North Sea off Whitby, Yorkshire with the loss of two of her crew. She was on a voyage from Leith, Lothian to London.
Merchant	United States	The steamship was driven ashore whilst on a voyage from New Orleans, Louisiana, to a port in the Republic of Texas with the loss of eight lives.
Moulmein	United Kingdom	The ship was lost off Palawan, Spanish East Indies.
Occitanie	France	The ship was wrecked on Saaremaa, Russia and was abandoned by her crew. She was on a voyage from Havre de Grâce, Seine-Inférieure to Saint Petersburg.
Ocean Queen	United Kingdom	The barque was wrecked in the Houtman Abrolhos.
Petrus and Helena	United Kingdom	The galiot was abandoned off "Segelskar" on or before 13 October.
Pluto	United States	The barque was driven ashore with the loss of five of her crew.
Porter	United Kingdom	The ship was wrecked in the Palawan Passage near Manila, Spanish East Indies before 20 October. Her crew were rescued. She was on a voyage from Sydney, New South Wales to Manila.
Regina	United Kingdom	The ship was run down and sunk in the Bristol Channel by the steamship Rose (United Kingdom). She was on a voyage from Exeter, Devon to Newport, Monmouthshire
San Antonio	Texas Navy	The schooner foundered with the loss of all hands. She was on a voyage from New Orleans, Louisiana, United States to Yucatán, Mexico.
Shannon	United Kingdom	The ship was wrecked on a reef in the Mozambique Channel (12°24′S 46°30′E). She was on a voyage from South Shields, County Durham to Aden.
Union	United Kingdom	The ship was driven ashore at Aspö, Grand Duchy of Finland. She was later refloated.
Virginia	United States	The barque was abandoned in the Atlantic Ocean off the coast of the Florida Territory.
Water Nymph	United Kingdom	The schooner was wrecked on the Long Sand, in the North Sea off the coast of Essex. Her crew were rescued. She was on a voyage from Newcastle upon Tyne, Northumberland to Dunkirk, Nord, France.
William and Henry Angas	United Kingdom	The ship was driven ashore at the Krasnaya Gorka fort, Saint Petersburg. She was on a voyage from Newcastle upon Tyne to Saint Petersburg. She was refloated on 14 October.
