= Admirals Beach =

- Town
- Location of Admirals Beach in Newfoundland
- Coordinates: 47°00′17″N 53°38′32″W
- Country: Canada
- Province: Newfoundland and Labrador
- Census division: 1
- Settled: c. 1805
- Incorporated (town): January 16, 1968

Government
  - Mayor: Theresa Bungay
  - MHA: Sherry Gambin-Walsh (Placentia-St. Mary's)
  - MP: Paul Connors (Avalon)

Area
  - Land: 24.42 km^{2} (9.43 sq mi)

Population (2021)
  - Total: 97
- Time zone: UTC-3:30 (Newfoundland Time)
  - Summer (DST): UTC-2:30 (Newfoundland Daylight)
- Postal Code: A0B 3A0
- Area code: 709
- Highways: Route 94

Admirals Beach is a rural community located in Newfoundland and Labrador, Canada.

Previously spelled Admiral's Beach, it is a fishing port located on the island of Newfoundland; specifically it is along a point of land in the southern Avalon Peninsula near Great Colinet Island fronting St. Mary's Bay.

The community was incorporated in January 1968.

== Geography ==
Good fishing grounds and a sheltered cove attracted the first settlers to the area. The town is part of Division 1 and is bounded by St. Mary's Bay and the unorganized area Subdivision W. Nearby communities include St. Joseph's, Riverhead and St. Mary's.

== History ==
Admirals Beach was first settled in the early nineteenth century by a French admiral. In 1864 there were three families living there. By 1911 it had a Post Office and a population of 39. The community grew over the years until a large population came from Great Colinet Island during the resettlement programme of 1956. Its population in the 2016 Census was 135.

== Demographics ==
In the 2021 Census of Population conducted by Statistics Canada, Admirals Beach had a population of 97 living in 48 of its 76 total private dwellings, a change of −28.1% from its 2016 population of 135. With a land area of 24.2 km^{2} (9.3 sq mi), it had a population density of 4.0/km^{2} (10.4/sq mi) in 2021.

== Economy ==
Although the majority of its residents were fishermen, Admirals Beach also had two ship building yards where fishing boats and longliners were built with supplies from local sawmills.

== See also ==
- List of cities and towns in Newfoundland and Labrador
