= Salt Island =

Salt Island can refer to:

== Places ==
=== United Kingdom ===
- Salt Island, Anglesey, Wales
- Salt Island, British Virgin Islands
- Salt Island, County Down, a townland in County Down, Northern Ireland

=== United States ===
- Salt Island (Alaska), a small island near Atka Island in the Aleutians, United States
- Salt Island (Connecticut), United States
- Salt Island, an island in Isle Royale National Park, Lake Superior, United States

=== Other places ===
- Saltholm, Øresund, Denmark
- Salt Island, Jamaica
- Sal, Cape Verde

== Other uses ==
- Isla de sal (Salt Island), a 1964 Venezuelan film directed by Clemente de la Cerda
