= St. Mary's Bay, Newfoundland and Labrador =

Natural bay in Newfoundland and Labrador

Coordinates: 46°50′00″N 53°44′57″W

Location of St. Mary's Bay in Newfoundland

St. Mary's Bay is one of many bays in Newfoundland, Canada, where bay is taken as a regional subdivision, somewhat along the lines of county divisions (Newfoundland, a largely maritime society, lacks counties). It is the most southern and eastern of Newfoundland's major bays.

It is located on the southern shore of the Avalon Peninsula and is the heartland of the Irish Newfoundlanders, who live all along its shores, stretching west to the Cape Shore and Placentia and northeast to the Southern Shore and St. John's. Like most Irish Newfoundlanders, area residents trace their ancestry to County Waterford, County Wexford, County Kilkenny, south County Tipperary and east County Cork. In addition to being Irish, the region is also overwhelmingly Roman Catholic.

St. Mary's Bay is an exceedingly rural area. None of the communities in the bay have a population in excess of 1000, and the bay as a whole is home to fewer than 5,000 people along (very roughly) the 150 km that make up 3 sides of its circumference, the 4th being uninhabitable ocean (note: because of bays, headlands, etc., the actual kilometres of shoreline are much more than 150).

St. Mary's Bay stretches approximately 40 kilometres (25 mi) wide at its mouth, from Point Lance in the west to Cape Freels in the east, and it extends almost 58 km (36 mi) to the NNE to its farthest point inland at Colinet.

The next bay to the west is Newfoundland's largest bay, Placentia Bay. To the east of St. Mary's Bay is the much smaller Trepassey Bay.

== St. Mary's Bay and Resettlement ==
St. Mary's Bay, while not hit as hard as neighbouring Placentia Bay, was subject to the Resettlement Program spearheaded by Joey Smallwood, Newfoundland and Labrador's first premier (1949-1972). People in rural communities deemed no longer viable (whether by reason of population, economics, or remote location) were pressured by the government to relocate to 'growth centres.' Thus, there are several ghost towns around St. Mary's Bay, abandoned a generation ago.

== Communities within St. Mary's Bay ==
Starting at the southwest extremity and moving around the bay in a clockwise fashion (population data from 2006 census) :

- Point Lance (2006 population: 119)
- Branch (2006 population: 309)
- North Harbour (2006 population for Division 1, Newfoundland and Labrador Subdv X: 510)
- Colinet (2006 population: 165)
- Harricot (2006 population: see North Harbour, above)
- Mount Carmel
- Mitchells Brook
- St. Catherine's (2006 population for Mount Carmel-Mitchells Brook-St. Catherine's: 438)
- Salmonier (Salmonier Line 2006 population: 212)
- New Bridge (2006 population for Division 1, Newfoundland and Labrador Subdv W: 561)
- St. Joseph's (2006 population: 144)
- O'Donnells (2006 population: see New Bridge, above)
- Admirals Beach (2006 population: 185)
- Mall Bay (2006 population: see New Bridge, above)
- Riverhead (2006 population: 220)
- St. Mary's (2006 population: 482)
- Point La Haye
- Gaskiers (2006 population for Point La Haye-Gaskiers: 302)
- St. Vincent's
- St. Stephen's
- Peter's River (2006 population for St. Vincent's-St. Stephen's-Peter's River: 363)
- St. Shott's (2005 population: 109)

== See also ==
- Avalon Peninsula
- Irish Newfoundlanders
- Newfoundland Irish
- Newfoundland outport
