= List of highways numbered 61 =

The following highways are numbered 61:

== International ==
- AH61 Asian Highway 61
- E61 European route E61

== Canada ==
- Alberta Highway 61
- Newfoundland and Labrador Route 61
- Ontario Highway 61

== Cuba ==
- Bauta–Baracoa Road (2–61)

== India ==
- National Highway 61 (India)
- State Highway 61 (Kerala)
- State Highway 61 (Rajasthan)

== Korea, South ==
- National Route 61

== New Zealand ==
- State Highway 61 (New Zealand) (former)

== Philippines ==
- N61 highway (Philippines)

== Poland ==
- Expressway S61
- National road 61

== United Kingdom ==
- British A61
- British M61

== United States ==
- U.S. Route 61
- Alabama State Route 61
  - County Route 61 (Lee County, Alabama)
- Arizona State Route 61
- California State Route 61
- Colorado State Highway 61
- Connecticut Route 61
- Florida State Road 61
  - Florida State Road 61A
  - County Road 61 (Wakulla County, Florida)
- Georgia State Route 61
- Hawaii Route 61
- Idaho State Highway 61
- Illinois Route 61
- Indiana State Road 61
- K-61 (Kansas highway)
- Kentucky Route 61
- Louisiana State Route 61 (former)
- Maryland Route 61
- M-61 (Michigan highway)
- Minnesota State Highway 61
  - County Road 61 (Hennepin County, Minnesota)
  - County Road 61 (Lake County, Minnesota)
  - County Road 61 (Pine County, Minnesota)
  - County Road 61 (St. Louis County, Minnesota)
- Missouri Route 61 (1922) (former)
- Nebraska Highway 61
  - Nebraska Link 61D
  - Nebraska Spur 61A
- Nevada State Route 61 (former)
- County Route 61 (Bergen County, New Jersey)
- New Mexico State Road 61
- New York State Route 61
  - County Route 61 (Chautauqua County, New York)
  - County Route 61 (Columbia County, New York)
  - County Route 61 (Dutchess County, New York)
  - County Route 61 (Greene County, New York)
  - County Route 61 (Madison County, New York)
  - County Route 61 (Onondaga County, New York)
  - County Route 61 (Orange County, New York)
  - County Route 61 (Putnam County, New York)
  - County Route 61 (Schoharie County, New York)
  - County Route 61 (Suffolk County, New York)
  - County Route 61 (Sullivan County, New York)
  - County Route 61 (Washington County, New York)
- North Carolina Highway 61
- North Dakota Highway 61 (former)
- Ohio State Route 61
- Oklahoma:
  - Oklahoma State Highway 61 (1934–1941) (former)
  - Oklahoma State Highway 61 (1944–1968) (former)
  - Oklahoma State Highway 61A (former)
- Pennsylvania Route 61
- South Carolina Highway 61
- South Dakota Highway 61 (former)
- Tennessee State Route 61
- Texas State Highway 61
  - Texas State Highway Loop 61 (former)
  - Farm to Market Road 61
  - Texas Park Road 61
- Utah State Route 61
- Virginia State Route 61
- West Virginia Route 61
- Wisconsin Highway 61 (former)

== See also ==
- A61
- Highway 61 (disambiguation)
- Route 61 (disambiguation)

| Preceded by 60 | Lists of highways 61 | Succeeded by 62 |
