= List of highways numbered 60A =

Route 60A, or Highway 60A, may refer to:

== India ==
- National Highway 60A (India)

== United States ==
- Florida State Road 60A (former)
- Maryland Route 60A

== See also ==
- A60 (disambiguation)
- List of highways numbered 60
