= SH60 =

SH60 may stand for:

- Sikorsky SH-60 Seahawk, an American-built ship-based helicopter
- Mitsubishi H-60, a Japanese version of the SH-60 helicopter
- List of highways numbered 60, for State Route 60 or State Road 60
