= List of highways numbered 62 =

The following highways are numbered 62:

== Australia ==
- Kennedy Developmental Road – Queensland State Route 62

== Canada ==
- Alberta Highway 62
- British Columbia Highway 62
- Newfoundland and Labrador Route 62
- Highway 62 (Ontario)
- Winnipeg Route 62

== Cuba ==
- Cartagena–Rodas Road (4–62)

== Greece ==
- A62 motorway (Hymettus Ring, formerly numbered the A64)
- EO62 road

== India ==
- National Highway 62 (India)

== Iran ==
- Road 62

== Korea, South ==
- National Route 62

== New Zealand ==
- New Zealand State Highway 62

== Philippines ==
- N62 highway (Philippines)

== South Africa ==
- Route 62 (South Africa)

== United Kingdom ==
- A62 road
- M62 motorway

== United States ==
- U.S. Route 62
  - U.S. Route 62 (Arizona-Virginia) (former proposal)
- Alabama State Route 62
  - County Route 62 (Lee County, Alabama)
- Arizona State Route 62 (former)
- Arkansas Highway 62 (1926) (former)
- California State Route 62
- Colorado State Highway 62
- Delaware Route 62
- Florida State Road 62
- Georgia State Route 62
  - Georgia State Route 62 (1926–1929) (former)
- Idaho State Highway 62
- Illinois Route 62
- Indiana State Road 62
- Iowa Highway 62
- K-62 (Kansas highway)
- Louisiana Highway 62
  - Louisiana State Route 62 (former)
- Maryland Route 62
- Massachusetts Route 62
- M-62 (Michigan highway)
- Minnesota: One of two Minnesota State Highway 62s:
  - Minnesota State Highway 62 (Hennepin–Dakota counties)
  - Minnesota State Highway 62 (Murray–Cottonwood counties)
  - County Road 62 (Hennepin County, Minnesota)
- Missouri Route 62 (1922) (former)
- Nebraska Highway 62
  - Nebraska Recreation Road 62B
  - Nebraska Recreation Road 62F
- Nevada State Route 62 (former)
- New Jersey Route 62
  - County Route 62 (Bergen County, New Jersey)
- New York:
  - New York State Route 62 (1920s-1930) (former)
  - New York State Route 62 (1930-1932) (former)
  - County Route 62 (Cattaraugus County, New York)
  - County Route 62C (Cayuga County, New York)
  - County Route 62 (Chemung County, New York)
  - County Route 62 (Dutchess County, New York)
  - County Route 62 (Erie County, New York)
  - County Route 62 (Jefferson County, New York)
  - County Route 62 (Livingston County, New York)
  - County Route 62 (Orange County, New York)
  - County Route 62 (Putnam County, New York)
  - County Route 62 (Schenectady County, New York)
  - County Route 62 (Suffolk County, New York)
  - County Route 62 (Sullivan County, New York)
  - County Route 62 (Warren County, New York)
  - County Route 62 (Washington County, New York)
  - County Route 62 (Westchester County, New York)
  - County Route 62 (Wyoming County, New York)
- North Carolina Highway 62
- North Dakota Highway 62 (former)
- Ohio State Route 62 (1923) (former)
- Oklahoma State Highway 62 (former)
- Oregon Route 62
- Pennsylvania Route 62 (1920s) (former)
- Tennessee State Route 62
- Texas State Highway 62
  - Texas State Highway Loop 62
  - Texas State Highway Spur 62
  - Farm to Market Road 62
  - Texas Park Road 62
- Utah State Route 62
- Vermont Route 62
- Virginia State Route 62
- West Virginia Route 62
- Wisconsin Highway 62 (former)

Territories

- U.S. Virgin Islands Highway 62

== See also ==
- List of highways numbered 62A
- A62

Preceded by 61	Lists of highways 62	Succeeded by 63
