= Route 62 (disambiguation) =

Route 62 may refer to:

- Route 62 (MTA Maryland), a defunct bus route in Baltimore, Maryland
- RATB route 62, a trolleybus route in Bucharest
- London Buses route 62
- Route 62 (WMATA), a bus route in Washington, D.C.
- Route 62 (South Africa), a wine route

== See also ==
- List of highways numbered 62
