= Route 59 (disambiguation) =

Route 59 may refer to:

- Route 59 (MTA Maryland), a bus route in Baltimore, Maryland and its suburbs
- Route 59 (MBTA), a bus route in Massachusetts
- London Buses route 59
- Melbourne tram route 59
- SEPTA Route 59, a trackless trolley in Northeast Philadelphia
- Route 59 station, a Metra train station along the BNSF Line on the border of Aurora, Illinois and Naperville, Illinois

== See also ==
- List of highways numbered 59
