= Little Colinet Island =

Island in St. Mary's Bay, Newfoundland and Labrador

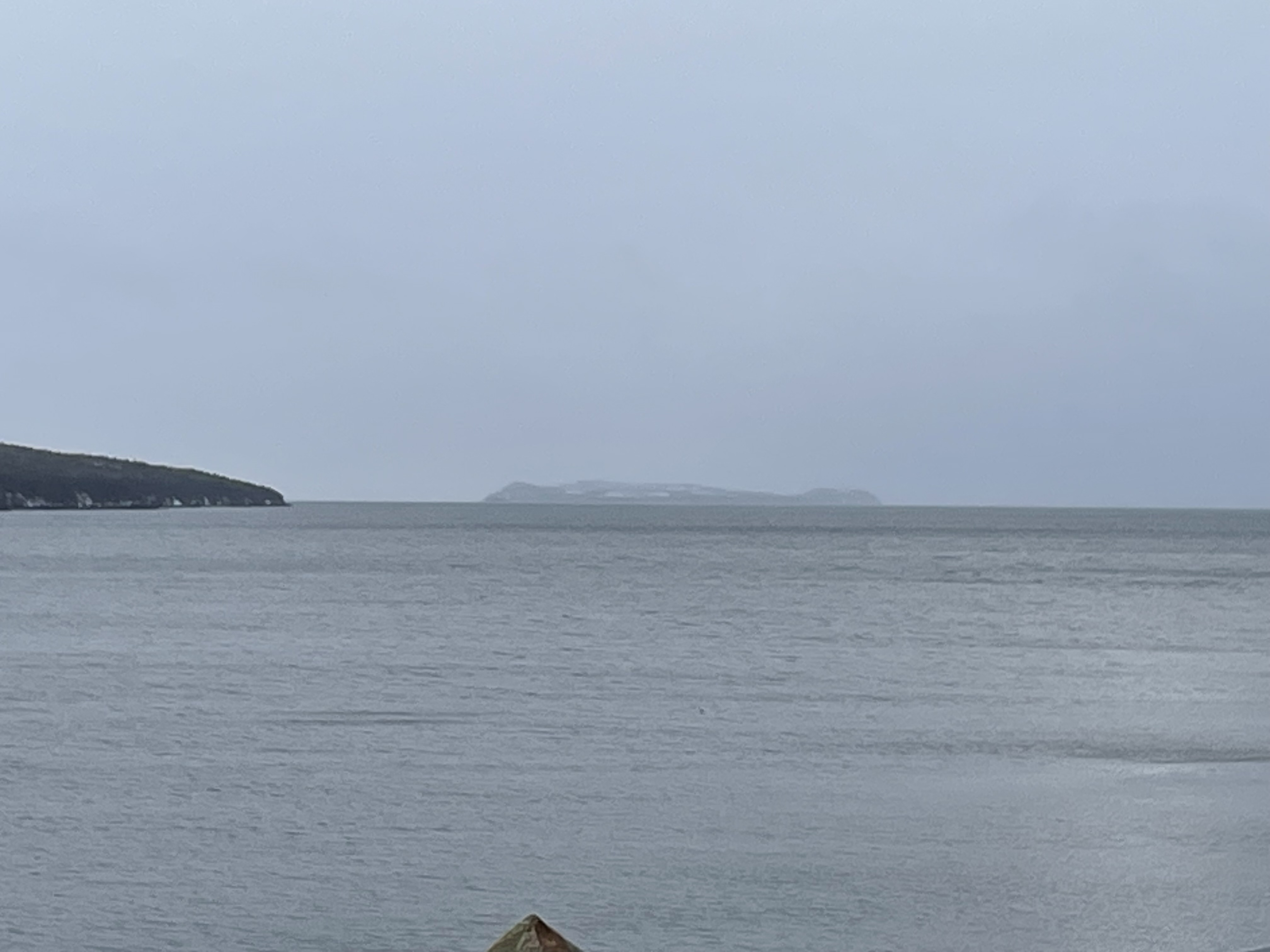
- Little Colinet Island as seen from Mitchell's Brook

- Location within Newfoundland

Geography
- Location: St. Mary's Bay
- Coordinates: 47°3′N 53°40′W
- Area: 1.92 km^{2} (0.74 sq mi)

Administration
- Canada
- Province: Newfoundland and Labrador

Demographics
- Population: 0

Little Colinet Island is an island in St. Mary's Bay, Newfoundland and Labrador. Little Colinet and Great Colinet Island, the larger island situated just South-easterly of it, make up the Colinet Islands.

Little Colinet Islands was first seen on English maps around 1669 and 1671, where it was called "Collinet" and "Colonet Isle". It would also appear on a French map in 1698 as "Collemont".

Due to their good coverage, it is believed that both islands were used as fishing stations in the 1700 and 1800s. However, permanent settlement of either islands would only be recorded in 1836.

In 1845, Little Colinet Island had a population of 7, this would increase to 10 in 1857. It is now uninhabited.
