= Route 61 =

Route 61 may refer to:

- Route 61 (MTA Maryland), a bus route in Baltimore, Maryland
- London Buses route 61, contracted bus route in England
- U.S. Route 61

== See also ==
- List of highways numbered 61
- Highway 61 (disambiguation)
