= List of highways numbered 59 =

The following highways are numbered 59:

== International ==
- E59 European route E59

== Australia ==
- Bells Line of Road

== Canada ==
- Alberta Highway 59
- Manitoba Highway 59

== China ==
- G59 Expressway

== Greece ==
- EO59 road

== India ==
- National Highway 59 (India)

== Iran ==
- Road 59

== Italy ==
- Autostrada A59

== Japan ==
- Hakodate-Esashi Expressway

== Korea, South ==
- National Route 59

== New Zealand ==
- New Zealand State Highway 59

== Philippines ==
- N59 highway (Philippines)

== United Kingdom ==
- British A59

== United States ==
- Interstate 59
- U.S. Route 59
- Alabama State Route 59
- Arkansas Highway 59
- California State Route 59
- Colorado State Highway 59
- Connecticut Route 59
- Florida State Road 59
  - County Road 59 (Jefferson County, Florida)
  - County Road 59 (Leon County, Florida)
  - County Road 59 (Wakulla County, Florida)
- Georgia State Route 59
- Illinois Route 59
- Indiana State Road 59
- Kentucky Route 59
- Louisiana Highway 59
- Maryland Route 59 (former)
- M-59 (Michigan highway)
- Missouri Route 59
- Montana Highway 59
- Nebraska Highway 59
  - Nebraska Link 59B
- Nevada State Route 59 (former)
- New Jersey Route 59
  - County Route 59 (Bergen County, New Jersey)
  - County Route 59 (Ocean County, New Jersey)
- New Mexico State Road 59
- New York State Route 59
  - County Route 59 (Chautauqua County, New York)
  - County Route 59 (Dutchess County, New York)
  - County Route 59 (Herkimer County, New York)
  - County Route 59 (Jefferson County, New York)
  - County Route 59 (Madison County, New York)
  - County Route 59 (Orange County, New York)
  - County Route 59 (Oswego County, New York)
  - County Route 59 (Putnam County, New York)
  - County Route 59 (Rensselaer County, New York)
  - County Route 59 (Schoharie County, New York)
  - County Route 59 (St. Lawrence County, New York)
  - County Route 59 (Steuben County, New York)
  - County Route 59 (Suffolk County, New York)
  - County Route 59 (Sullivan County, New York)
  - County Route 59 (Washington County, New York)
  - County Route 59 (Wyoming County, New York)
- North Carolina Highway 59 (former)
- North Dakota Highway 59
- Ohio State Route 59
- Oklahoma State Highway 59
  - Oklahoma State Highway 59B
- Pennsylvania Route 59
- South Carolina Highway 59
- South Dakota Highway 59 (former)
- Tennessee State Route 59
- Texas State Highway 59
  - Texas State Highway Spur 59
  - Farm to Market Road 59
  - Texas Park Road 59
- Utah State Route 59
- Virginia State Route 59
- West Virginia Route 59
- Wisconsin Highway 59
- Wyoming Highway 59

== See also ==
- List of highways numbered 59A
- A59 (disambiguation)

Preceded by 58	Lists of highways 59	Succeeded by 60
