= List of highways numbered 59A =

The following highways are numbered 59A:

== United States ==
- Illinois Route 59A (former)
- New York State Route 59A (former)
- Oklahoma State Highway 59A

== See also ==
- List of highways numbered 59
