= List of highways numbered 60 =

The following highways are numbered 60:

== International ==
- AH60 Asian Highway 60
- E60 European route E60

== Australia ==
- Bruxner Highway
- Dawson Highway (Rolleston to Gladstone) – Queensland State Route 60

== Brazil ==
- BR-060

== Canada ==
- Alberta Highway 60
- Manitoba Highway 60
- Newfoundland and Labrador Route 60
- Ontario Highway 60
- Saskatchewan Highway 60

== China ==
- G60 Expressway

== Greece ==
- EO60 road

== Hungary ==
- M60 motorway (Hungary)

== India ==
- NH 60

== Israel/Palestine ==
- Highway 60 (Israel–Palestine)

== Italy ==
- Autostrada A60

== Japan ==
- Obihiro-Hiroo Expressway

== Jordan ==
- Highway 60

== Korea, South ==
- Seoul–Yangyang Expressway
- Gukjido 60

== New Zealand ==
- New Zealand State Highway 60

== Philippines ==
- N60 highway (Philippines)

== United Kingdom ==
- British A60
- British M60

== United States ==
- U.S. Route 60
  - U.S. Route 60 (California-Illinois) (former proposal)
- Alabama State Route 60
  - County Route 60 (Lee County, Alabama)
- Arkansas Highway 60
- California State Route 60
- Colorado State Highway 60
- Florida State Road 60
- Georgia State Route 60
  - Georgia State Route 60 (former)
  - Georgia State Route 60 (former)
- Idaho State Highway 60
- Illinois Route 60
- Indiana State Road 60
- Iowa Highway 60
- K-60 (Kansas highway)
- Louisiana Highway 60
  - Louisiana State Route 60 (former)
- Maryland Route 60
- Massachusetts Route 60
- M-60 (Michigan highway)
- Minnesota State Highway 60
  - County Road 60 (Dakota County, Minnesota)
  - County Road 60 (Hennepin County, Minnesota)
- Missouri Route 60 (1922) (former)
- Nebraska Highway 60 (former)
- Nevada:
  - Nevada State Route 60 (1937) (former)
  - Nevada State Route 60 (1940s) (former)
- New Jersey Route 60 (former)
  - County Route 60 (Bergen County, New Jersey)
- New York State Route 60
  - County Route 60 (Broome County, New York)
  - County Route 60 (Cayuga County, New York)
  - County Route 60 (Chemung County, New York)
  - County Route 60 (Dutchess County, New York)
  - County Route 60 (Franklin County, New York)
  - County Route 60 (Niagara County, New York)
  - County Route 60 (Oneida County, New York)
  - County Route 60 (Onondaga County, New York)
  - County Route 60 (Orange County, New York)
  - County Route 60 (Putnam County, New York)
  - County Route 60 (Rensselaer County, New York)
  - County Route 60 (Rockland County, New York)
  - County Route 60 (Saratoga County, New York)
  - County Route 60 (Schenectady County, New York)
  - County Route 60 (Schoharie County, New York)
  - County Route 60 (Suffolk County, New York)
  - County Route 60 (Tioga County, New York)
  - County Route 60 (Washington County, New York)
- North Carolina Highway 60
- North Dakota Highway 60
- Ohio State Route 60
- Pennsylvania Route 60
- South Carolina Highway 60
- Tennessee State Route 60
- Texas State Highway 60
  - Texas State Highway Loop 60
  - Farm to Market Road 60
  - Texas Park Road 60
- Utah State Route 60
- Wisconsin Highway 60

- Puerto Rico Highway 60
- U.S. Virgin Islands Highway 60

== See also ==
- List of highways numbered 60A
- A60
- Interstate 60, 2003 film by Bob Gale

Preceded by 59	Lists of highways 60	Succeeded by 61
