= Highway 61 =

Highway 61 may refer to:

- Highway 61 Revisited, 1965 album by Bob Dylan
  - "Highway 61 Revisited" (song), the title track from the album
- Highway 61 (film), 1991 film by Bruce McDonald
  - Highway 61 (soundtrack), the accompanying album soundtrack to Bruce McDonald's film
- Highway 61 Motorcycle Club, an outlaw motorcycle club founded in New Zealand
- US Route 61, also known as "The Blues Highway", from which the song, album and film are based
- Ontario Highway 61 is a provincially maintained highway in Ontario which was featured in the 1991 film "Highway 61"

== See also ==
- List of highways numbered 61
- Route 61 (disambiguation)
