= Great Colinet Island =

Island in St. Mary's Bay, Newfoundland and Labrador

- Location within Newfoundland

Geography
- Location: St. Mary's Bay
- Coordinates: 46°59′N 53°41′W
- Area: 11.5 km^{2} (4.4 sq mi)
- Highest elevation: 305 m (1001 ft)
- Highest point: Topsails

Administration
- Canada
- Province: Newfoundland and Labrador

Demographics
- Population: 0

Great Colinet Island is an island of St. Mary's Bay, Newfoundland and Labrador, Canada. Both this island and Little Colinet Island make up the Colinet Islands.

Great Colinet Island is approximately 8 km long and 2 km wide with the highest point called Topsails at approximately 305 m. The island first appeared on English maps in 1669 as Collinet and in 1671 as Colonet Isle. Then in 1698 it was labeled Collemot on French maps.

Two permanent settlements were recorded on the island Mosquito and Mother IXX which was originally called Regina. In 1951 it was proclamined Reginaville.
