= List of highways numbered 62A =

The following highways are numbered 62A:

== United States ==
- Nebraska Link 62A
- New York State Route 62A (former)

== See also ==
- List of highways numbered 62
