= Mall Bay (settlement) =

Coordinates: 46.983°N 53.574°W

Location of Mall Bay in Newfoundland and Labrador

Mall Bay is a settlement on Mall Bay in Newfoundland and Labrador.

The first recorded history dates back to the late 1500s, where boats were observed fishing in the adjacent Bay of St. Mary's. Mall Bay village currently (2012) has approximate population of 20 full-time residents. In recent years there has also been a colony of geese that migrate to the village.
