= A59 =

A59 may refer to:

- A59 road, a road connecting Liverpool and York in England
- A59 motorway (Netherlands), a road connecting Willemstad and Oss
- Benko Gambit in chess (Encyclopaedia of Chess Openings code A59, among others)
