= A61 =

A61 or A-61 may refer to:

- A61 road (England), a road connecting Derby and Thirsk
- A61 motorway (France), a road connecting Narbonne and Bordeaux
- A61 motorway (Germany), a road connecting Venlo and Hockenheim
- Benoni Defense, in the Encyclopaedia of Chess Openings
