= St. Joseph's, Newfoundland and Labrador =

Coordinates: 47.118°N 53.5094°W

St. Joseph's
- Town
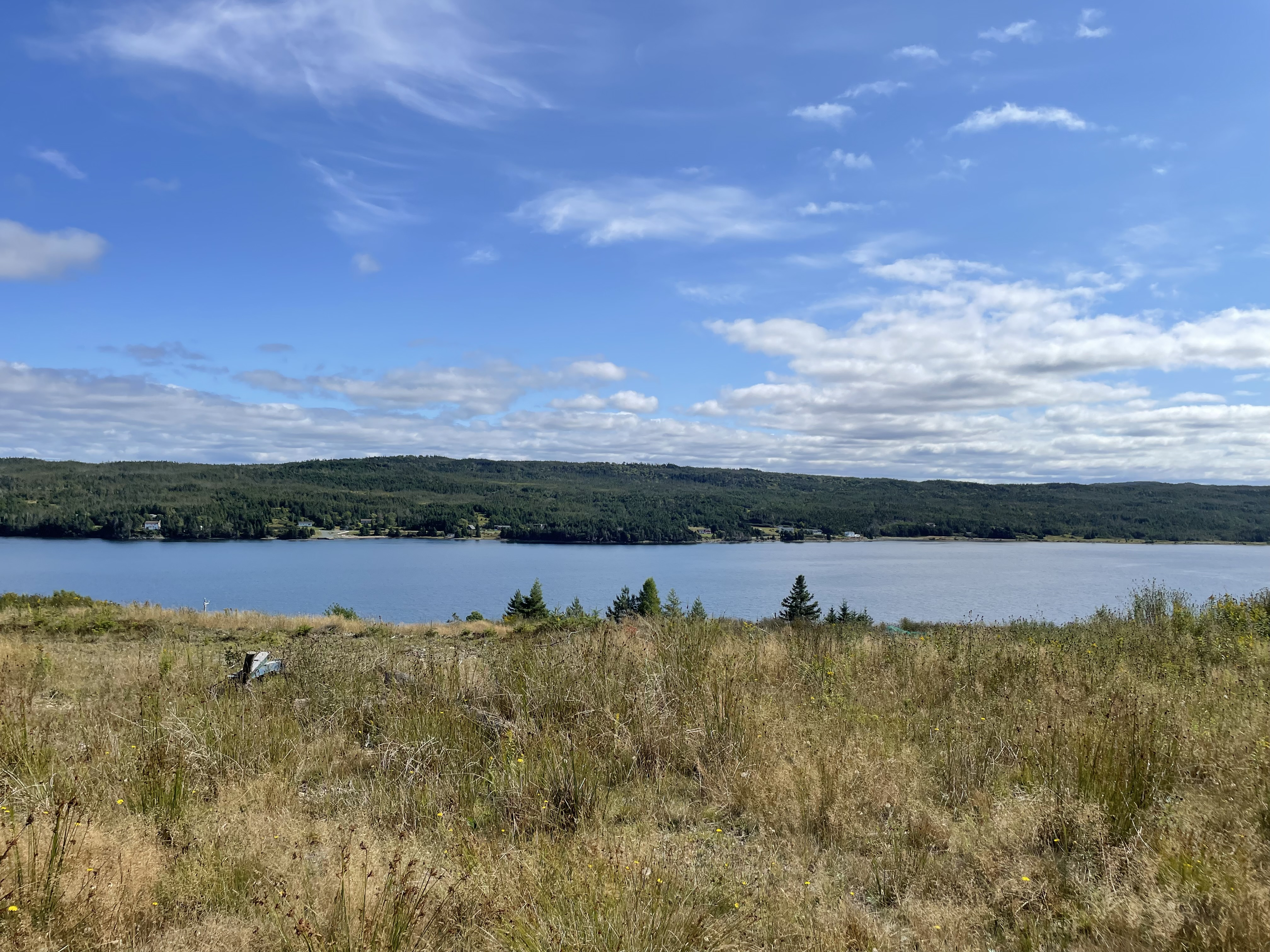
- St. Joseph's as seen from Mount Carmel across the Salmonier Arm
- Interactive map of St. Joseph's
- Country: Canada
- Province: Newfoundland and Labrador

Population (2021)
  - Total: 86
- Time zone: UTC-3:30 (Newfoundland Time)
  - Summer (DST): UTC-2:30 (Newfoundland Daylight)
- Area code: 709
- Highways: Route 90; Route 94

St. Joseph's is a town in the Canadian province of Newfoundland and Labrador. It is located on the Avalon Peninsula, approximately 70 kilometres southwest of St. John's, and near St. Mary's Bay.

The town had a population of 86 in the Canada 2021 Census.

== Demographics ==
In the 2021 Census of Population conducted by Statistics Canada, St. Joseph's had a population of 86 living in 45 of its 79 total private dwellings, a change of −25.2% from its 2016 population of 115. With a land area of 29.22 km^{2} (11.28 sq mi), it had a population density of 2.9/km^{2} (7.6/sq mi) in 2021.

== See also ==
- List of cities and towns in Newfoundland and Labrador
