= A62 =

A62 or A-62 may refer to:

- A62 road (England), a road connecting Manchester and Leeds
- A62 motorway (France), a road connecting Toulouse and Bordeaux
- A62 motorway (Germany), a road connecting the A1 with the A6
- A62 motorway (Spain), a road connecting the Portuguese Border and Burgos
- Benoni Defense, in the Encyclopaedia of Chess Openings
- London Underground A62 Stock, rolling stock used on the Metropolitan and East London lines on the London Underground
