= Minnesota State Highway 62 =

Minnesota State Highway 62 can refer to two distinct state highways in Minnesota.

- Minnesota State Highway 62 (Murray–Cottonwood counties), the original Highway 62 in southwest Minnesota, an east–west route between the cities of Fulda and Windom since 1933.
- Minnesota State Highway 62 (Hennepin–Dakota counties), the Crosstown Highway, located in the Twin Cities area, which became a state highway in 1988.
