= Mall Bay (Newfoundland and Labrador) =

Coordinates: 46.966°N 53.581°W

Mall Bay is a natural bay on the island of Newfoundland in the province of Newfoundland and Labrador, Canada.
