= Salt Island (Connecticut) =

Island in Middlesex County, Connecticut, United States

Coordinates: 41°16′32″N 72°26′30″W

Salt Island is an island off the coast of Westbrook, Middlesex County, in the U.S. state of Connecticut. The island is very easy to get to from the Westbrook public beaches, as it is only 500 feet away from land. Because the island was so close to land, people would often haul carts and horses to the island on a shallow day to gather materials for themselves.

"In the year of 1871, Theodore D. Post, together with his brother, Gilbert A. Post, and three neighbors, J.L. Stokes, George Kirtland and C.R. Stannard, organized and operated the Salt Island Oil Company to manufacture Manhaden Oil and Fish Guano. Theodore Post acted as President and Treasurer and he took care of all the bookkeeping and paper work. Almost all of the operation took place on Salt Island, a short distance from the shore off Middle Beach [in Westbrook, CT]. The company constructed several small buildings, a dock, heating facilities and a press to separate the oil from the fish. A great deal of fishing gear was assembled, including boats, nets, and sails and one large scow. The operation consisted of catching large quantities of fish in nets, heating them in large iron vats, and then pressing out the oil. The oil was put into wooden vats or barrels and shipped by boat, mostly to New York City. The residue of the fish, consisted of scraps, bones, skin, heads, etc. was sold as Fish Guano, or fertilizer. Many of the farmers in Westbrook used this product and the soil became very rich and produced excellent crops.

Theodore's son, Edwin Albert Post, spent much of his boyhood working and playing around Salt Island during the fifteen years the company was in operation. His mother died when he was ten years old, so it became his job to take care of the home and his little sister, do the cooking and the farm chores while his father was busy catching fish and manufacturing the oil and guano. They worked out a system of signals so that if something was needed on the Island or at home, a message could be sent from a window in the house which could be seen on Salt Island. There were no telephones in Town at that time. If needed, father could drive a horse or a yoke of oxen with a load of wood to the island at low tide, or any other materials which might be needed. Often, he would bring a load of seaweed home to bank around the foundation of the house to keep it warm during winter months or put the seaweed into the cow yard to keep the animals clean and to add to the fertilizer needed for planting in the spring.

The Company prospered until 1886. About that time, well-to-do families from the large cities began to build summer homes on the beautiful shores of Westbrook and they objected to the odor from the oil and guano factory. The summer residents finally succeeded in having the operation closed by law."

Salt Island is also home to a number of kinds of animals, being watched over by the Stewart B. McKinney National Wildlife Refuge. Some parts of the island are not accessible due to wild seabird habitats. The indigenous animals that can be found on Salt Island include channeled whelks, Atlantic horseshoe crabs, common periwinkle, North American spider crabs, giant hermit crabs, terns, and oystercatchers.

The island is also known for its strange rock formations. The rocks are carved from constant wave splashing and the changing of the tides. The rocks are short and almost resemble waves of the ocean. They can be touched but if not careful, you will cut yourself due to the intricate edges on the rocks from hundreds of years of formation.
