= A60 =

A60 or A-60 may refer to:

- A60 road, a road connecting Loughborough and Doncaster via Nottingham in England
- A60 highway, a proposed road to connect Valladolid and Leon in Spain
- A60 Highway, a highway which bypasses the southern suburbs of the city of Varese, Italy
- Autobahn 60, a highway in Germany
- Benoni Defense, in the Encyclopaedia of Chess Openings
- Beriev A-60, a Soviet and then Russian airborne laser flying laboratory
- London Underground A60 Stock, rolling stock used on the Metropolitan and East London lines on the London Underground
- Samsung Galaxy A60, smartphone released in 2019
- A model number of the Austin Cambridge car range
- A-series light bulb of diameter 60 mm
- A-60, an entity that originates from Roblox game Rooms
