= New Bridge, Newfoundland and Labrador =

Settlement in Newfoundland and Labrador, Canada

Coordinates: 47.131°N 53.481°W

Location of New Bridge in Newfoundland and Labrador

New Bridge is a settlement in Newfoundland and Labrador.
