= Riverhead, Newfoundland and Labrador =

Riverhead
- Town
- Interactive map of Riverhead
- Coordinates: 46°59′36″N 53°29′00″W
- Country: Canada
- Province: Newfoundland and Labrador

Population (2021)
  - Total: 165
- Time zone: UTC-3:30 (Newfoundland Time)
  - Summer (DST): UTC-2:30 (Newfoundland Daylight)
- Area code: 709
- Highways: Route 90

Riverhead was a small village of 20 families in 1864. It is now a town in the St. Mary's area with a population of over 400 by 1968.

== Demographics ==
In the 2021 Census of Population conducted by Statistics Canada, Riverhead had a population of 165 living in 87 of its 128 total private dwellings, a change of −10.8% from its 2016 population of 185. With a land area of 101.84 km^{2} (39.32 sq mi), it had a population density of 1.6/km^{2} (4.2/sq mi) in 2021.

== See also ==
- List of cities and towns in Newfoundland and Labrador
