= St. Vincent's-St. Stephen's-Peter's River =

St. Vincent's–St. Stephen's–Peter's River
- Town
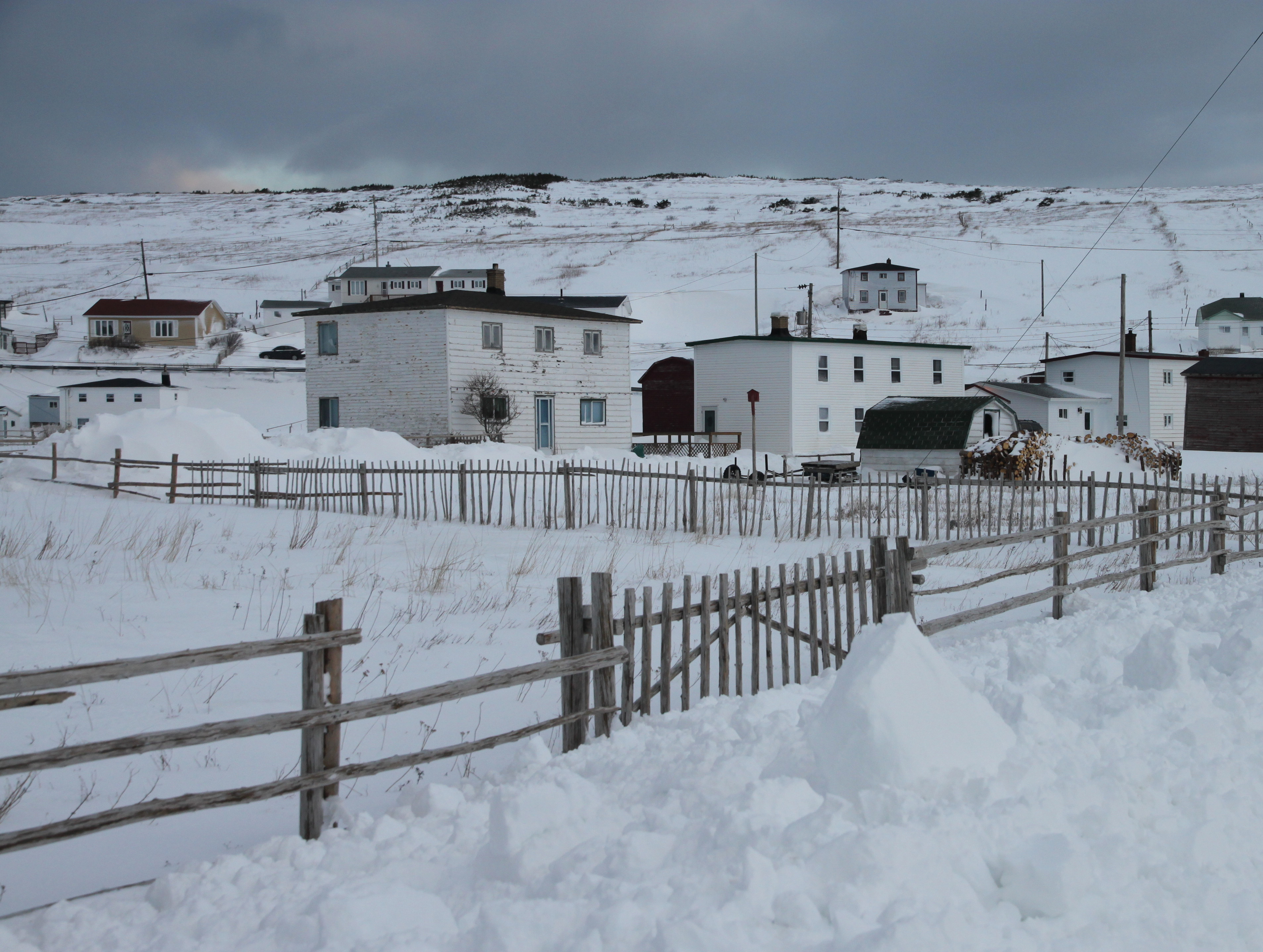
- St. Vincent's

- Location in Newfoundland
- Coordinates: 46°46′N 53°35′W
- Country: Canada
- Province: Newfoundland and Labrador

Area
  - Land: 87.50 km^{2} (33.78 sq mi)

Population (2021)
  - Total: 263
  - Density: 3.6/km^{2} (9.3/sq mi)
- Time zone: UTC-3:30 (NST)
  - Summer (DST): UTC-2:30 (NDT)
- Area code: 709
- Highways: Route 10; Route 90

St. Vincent's–St. Stephen's–Peter's River is a town in the Canadian province of Newfoundland and Labrador. The town had a population of 263 in the Canada 2021 Census.

== Demographics ==
In the 2021 Census of Population conducted by Statistics Canada, St. Vincent's-St. Stephen's-Peter's River had a population of 263 living in 142 of its 207 total private dwellings, a change of −16% from its 2016 population of 313. With a land area of 86.62 km^{2} (33.44 sq mi), it had a population density of 3.0/km^{2} (7.9/sq mi) in 2021.

== See also ==
- List of cities and towns in Newfoundland and Labrador
