= O'Donnells, Newfoundland and Labrador =

Local service district of Newfoundland and Labrador, Canada

Coordinates: 47°04′00″N 53°34′00″W

O'Donnells is a local service district and designated place in the Canadian province of Newfoundland and Labrador. It is southeast of Placentia. The first postmistress was Mrs. Theresa M. Hanlon on July 16, 1951. By 1956 there was a population of 244.

== History ==
The community of O’Donnell's, formerly known as Mussel Pond, is situated at the head of Mussel Pond Cove on the eastern side of St. Mary's Bay on the southeast coast of Newfoundland. The name Mussel Pond was originally given to the settlement by a fishing fleet because of the abundance of mussels found in the ponds and cove. Father Enright, an Irish Roman Catholic priest who became parish priest of that community in 1919, changed the traditional name to O’Donnell's (after Bishop O’Donel, the first Roman Catholic prelate in Newfoundland).

== Geography ==
O'Donnells is in Newfoundland within Subdivision W of Division No. 1. The community wraps around both sides and the head of the cove and the topography of the land is relatively flat.

== Demographics ==
As a designated place in the 2016 Census of Population conducted by Statistics Canada, O'Donnells recorded a population of 125 living in 52 of its 77 total private dwellings, a change of -20.4% from its 2011 population of 157. With a land area of 3.44 km^{2} (1.33 sq mi), it had a population density of 36.3/km^{2} (94.1/sq mi) in 2016.

== Government ==
O'Donnells is a local service district (LSD) that is governed by a committee responsible for the provision of certain services to the community. The chair of the LSD committee is Gerard Hanlon.

== See also ==
- List of communities in Newfoundland and Labrador
- List of designated places in Newfoundland and Labrador
- List of local service districts in Newfoundland and Labrador
