= St. Mary's, Newfoundland and Labrador =

St. Mary's
- Town
- Location of St. Mary's in Newfoundland St. Mary's (Canada)
- Coordinates: 46°54′49″N 53°31′54″W
- Country: Canada
- Province: Newfoundland and Labrador
- Census division: 1
- Settled: 1600s
- Incorporated (town): 1966

Government
  - MHA: Sherry Gambin-Walsh (LIB)
  - MP: Paul Connors (LIB)

Area
  - Land: 37.05 km^{2} (14.31 sq mi)

Population (2021)
  - Total: 313
  - Density: 9.4/km^{2} (24/sq mi)
- Time zone: UTC-03:30 (NST)
  - Summer (DST): UTC0-2:30 (NDT)
- Area code: 709
- Highways: Route 90

St. Mary's is a town in the Canadian province of Newfoundland and Labrador. The town had a population of 313 in the Canada 2021 Census.

The town has a Catholic church, a bed & breakfast (which provides the only overnight accommodations in the area), a small pub, and 2 gas stations which also serve as convenience stores.

Point La Haye Beach is a popular picnic location in summer, and is located very near an automated lighthouse and long, natural barachois. Other than this, there are little tourist attractions in the area, and most tourists are travellers of the Irish Loop Drive, passing through the town.

== Seafood processing industry ==
Most of the employment in the community was from the local seafood processing plant, which operated in the summer months. There was briefly a fish sauce plant that used the byproduct of the main processing plant. Removal of the fish sauce plant and its contents and clean-up of the site begin in July 2026. The fish plant was destroyed by fire in November 2025 and as of August 2026 had not been rebuilt. At the time of the fire, the St. Mary's Bay Fisheries plant, owned by Daley Seafoods Inc, employed up to 300 workers.

== Climate ==
St. Mary's exhibits an oceanic climate (Köppen Cfb) or a humid continental climate (Dfb) depending on the isotherm used.

Climate data for St. Mary's Climate ID: 840C616; coordinates 46°55′N 53°34′W; elevation: 15.5 m (51 ft); 1981–2010 normals, extremes 1982–present
Month	Jan	Feb	Mar	Apr	May	Jun	Jul	Aug	Sep	Oct	Nov	Dec	Year
Record high °C (°F)	13.0 (55.4)	13.5 (56.3)	18.0 (64.4)	21.0 (69.8)	21.0 (69.8)	23.5 (74.3)	25.0 (77.0)	27.0 (80.6)	26.5 (79.7)	21.5 (70.7)	18.0 (64.4)	14.0 (57.2)	27.0 (80.6)
Mean daily maximum °C (°F)	0.6 (33.1)	0.7 (33.3)	2.9 (37.2)	6.6 (43.9)	10.6 (51.1)	14.5 (58.1)	17.8 (64.0)	19.1 (66.4)	16.3 (61.3)	11.4 (52.5)	6.9 (44.4)	2.9 (37.2)	9.2 (48.6)
Daily mean °C (°F)	−2.9 (26.8)	−2.9 (26.8)	−0.6 (30.9)	3.2 (37.8)	6.6 (43.9)	10.5 (50.9)	14.3 (57.7)	15.8 (60.4)	12.9 (55.2)	8.4 (47.1)	4.0 (39.2)	0.0 (32.0)	5.8 (42.4)
Mean daily minimum °C (°F)	−6.3 (20.7)	−6.5 (20.3)	−4.0 (24.8)	−0.2 (31.6)	2.6 (36.7)	6.4 (43.5)	10.8 (51.4)	12.4 (54.3)	9.5 (49.1)	5.3 (41.5)	1.1 (34.0)	−2.9 (26.8)	2.4 (36.3)
Record low °C (°F)	−18.5 (−1.3)	−21.5 (−6.7)	−21.0 (−5.8)	−12.0 (10.4)	−6.0 (21.2)	−1.0 (30.2)	3.0 (37.4)	2.5 (36.5)	1.0 (33.8)	−5.0 (23.0)	−12.0 (10.4)	−16.0 (3.2)	−21.5 (−6.7)
Average precipitation mm (inches)	131.7 (5.19)	130.3 (5.13)	134.9 (5.31)	115.7 (4.56)	109.9 (4.33)	117.8 (4.64)	120.4 (4.74)	103.9 (4.09)	124.3 (4.89)	134.3 (5.29)	146.6 (5.77)	141.0 (5.55)	1,510.8 (59.48)
Average rainfall mm (inches)	93.4 (3.68)	94.1 (3.70)	111.2 (4.38)	105.8 (4.17)	108.2 (4.26)	117.8 (4.64)	120.4 (4.74)	103.9 (4.09)	124.3 (4.89)	133.7 (5.26)	138.9 (5.47)	112.7 (4.44)	1,364.4 (53.72)
Average snowfall cm (inches)	38.3 (15.1)	36.3 (14.3)	23.8 (9.4)	9.9 (3.9)	1.6 (0.6)	0 (0)	0 (0)	0 (0)	0 (0)	0.6 (0.2)	7.7 (3.0)	28.4 (11.2)	146.6 (57.7)
Average precipitation days (≥ 0.2 mm)	14.1	13.3	12.6	12.7	13.4	13.7	14.1	13.8	14.1	14.9	15.5	14.4	166.6
Average rainy days (≥ 0.2 mm)	8.7	8.1	9.6	11.5	13.3	13.7	14.1	13.8	14.1	14.9	14.3	11.3	147.4
Average snowy days (≥ 0.2 cm)	6.9	6.3	4.2	1.7	0.31	0	0	0	0	0.07	1.6	4.3	25.38
Source: 1981-2010 Environment Canada

== Demographics ==
In the 2021 Census of Population conducted by Statistics Canada, St. Mary's had a population of 313 living in 158 of its 202 total private dwellings, a change of −9.8% from its 2016 population of 347. With a land area of 36.41 km^{2} (14.06 sq mi), it had a population density of 8.6/km^{2} (22.3/sq mi) in 2021.

== See also ==
- Avalon Peninsula
- List of cities and towns in Newfoundland and Labrador
- Newfoundland outport
- St. Mary's Bay
