= Paul Johnson (philanthropist) =

Canadian philanthropist (1929–2015)

Paul Jolliffe Johnson, ONL (1929- October 12, 2015) was a businessman and philanthropist born St. John's, Newfoundland, the son of Marjorie (Jolliffe) and Arthur Johnson. He was educated at Prince of Wales College, King's College, Mount Allison Academy and Mount Allison University.

Johnson, who is a commerce graduate, became involved in many aspects of business in Newfoundland. Johnson assumed management of Johnson Insurance in 1953 and by 1990 was president and chief executive officer of Johnson Insurance Limited, Gulf-National Agencies, Unifund Assurance Company, Johnson Business Services Limited, Food Services Limited, Food Services Corporation Limited and Star Corporation Limited.

Active in community and service organizations, Johnson served as chairman of the Salvation Army Advisory Board, receiving the Distinguished Service Order for his work. For 12 years he was chairman of the St. John's Housing Authority, a voluntary position, and was a founding member of the St. John's Heritage Foundation. Johnson was also chairman of the Gilbert Memorial Committee and a twenty-year member of the Rotary Club of St. John's.

In 1987 Paul had established the Johnson Family Foundation to support the preservation of heritage sites in the province and other charitable projects. Since that time, many major projects such as the development of "The Lookout" on Signal Hill, the establishment of the Harbourside Park and Gilbert Memorial, the establishment of the Railway Coastal Museum and the Geological Interpretation centre, to name a few, have been realized. He is renowned for his Grand Concourse Authority, a partnership which brought together the resources of the three levels of government and the university to beautify the capital region and showcase its spectacular heritage and natural assets.

An active member of The Joseph R. Smallwood Heritage Foundation, he was elected co-chairman in 1990.

In 2004, Johnson was one of the first nine Newfoundlanders awarded the Order of Newfoundland and Labrador, considered the highest honour of the province.

Johnson died on October 12, 2015, in St. John's.

== See also ==
- List of people of Newfoundland and Labrador
- List of communities in Newfoundland and Labrador
