= Johnson Geo Centre =

Geological museum in Newfoundland, Canada

Coordinates: 47°34′21.84″N 52°41′23.90″W

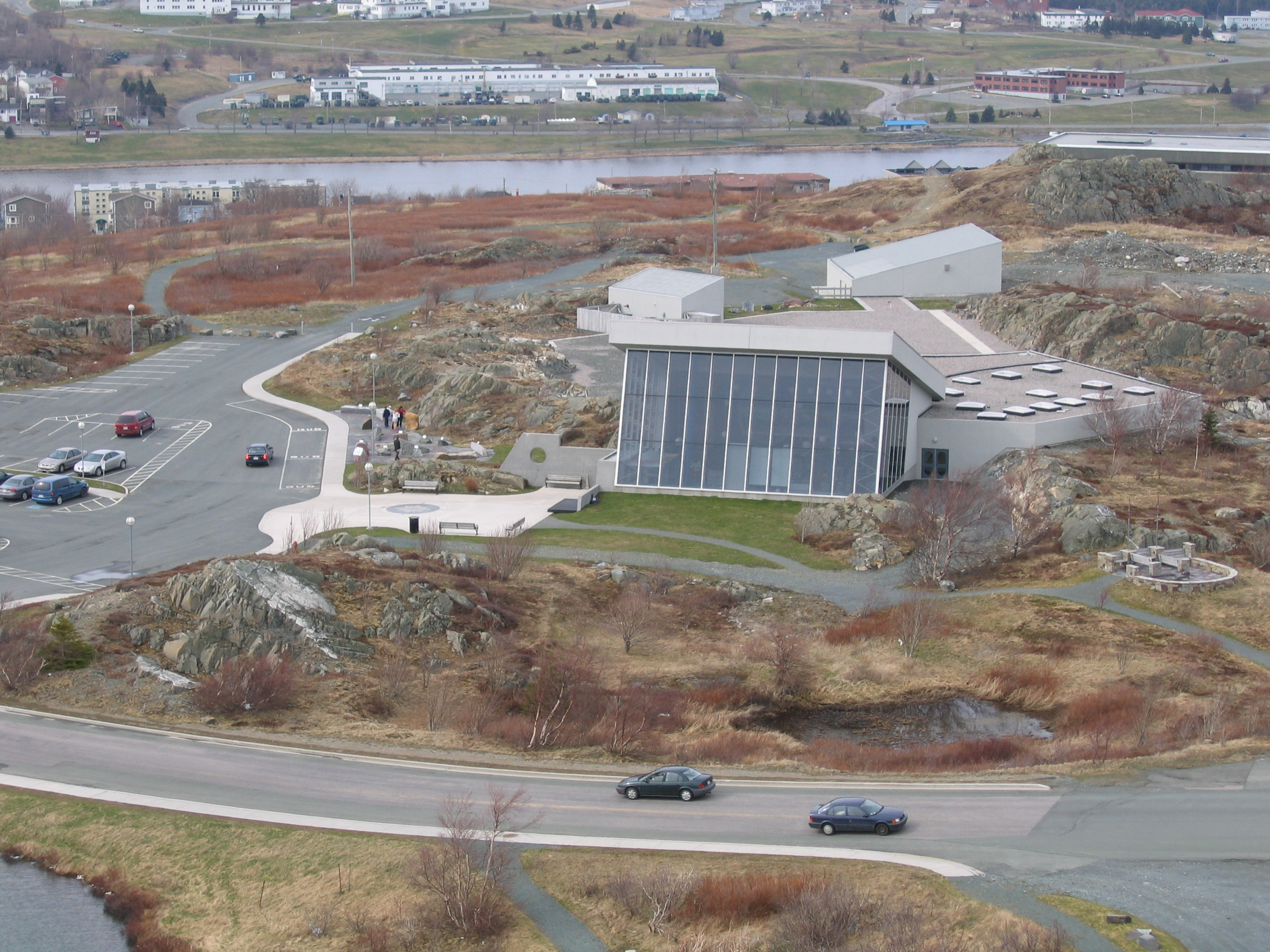
- Established: 2002
- Location: 175 Signal Hill Road; St. John's, Newfoundland and Labrador; A1A 1B2
- Type: geological interpretation centre
- Website: www.geocentre.ca/

The Johnson Geo Centre is a geological interpretation centre, within a small park, located on Signal Hill in St. John's, Newfoundland and Labrador, Canada. The museum is named for philanthropist Paul Johnson and opened in 2002.

== Building Design ==
Most of the centre is located underground, in an excavated glacial formation that shows the exposed bedrock of the hill.

The building is designed to take advantage of the geological features of Signal Hill where most of the structure is below ground exposing natural rock formations. The area was originally a peat filled area that was stripped of overburden and a glass-encased structure of 2.5 stories was built atop the excavation. The building was built through the Johnson Family Foundation at a cost of $11 million. The building utilizes a heating and cooling system via six geothermal wells drilled to a depth of 500 feet.

== Museum Content ==
Visitors travel a 3.7 billion year timeline, exploring themes such as continental drift, glaciation, earthquakes and volcanoes.

The site also includes the outdoor Johnson GEO-VISTA Park, which shows how stone was used throughout Newfoundland and Labrador's history, including a replica of a root cellar, graveyard, and house chimney.

== Affiliations ==
The Museum is affiliated with: Canadian Association of Science Centres (CASC), Association of Science-Technology Centers (ASTC). CMA, CHIN, and Virtual Museum of Canada.

== Johnson Geo-Vista Park ==
Associated with the Johnson Geo Centre there is a small park with eight looped trails, informative outdoor displays that explain the local geological formations, botanical species, and traditional uses of stone. Completed in 2007, the park surrounds the Geo Centre and includes Deadman's Pond acres Signal Hill road. Both the Geo Park's and Signal National Historic Park's trails are linked to the Grand Concourse walkway system.

== Gallery ==
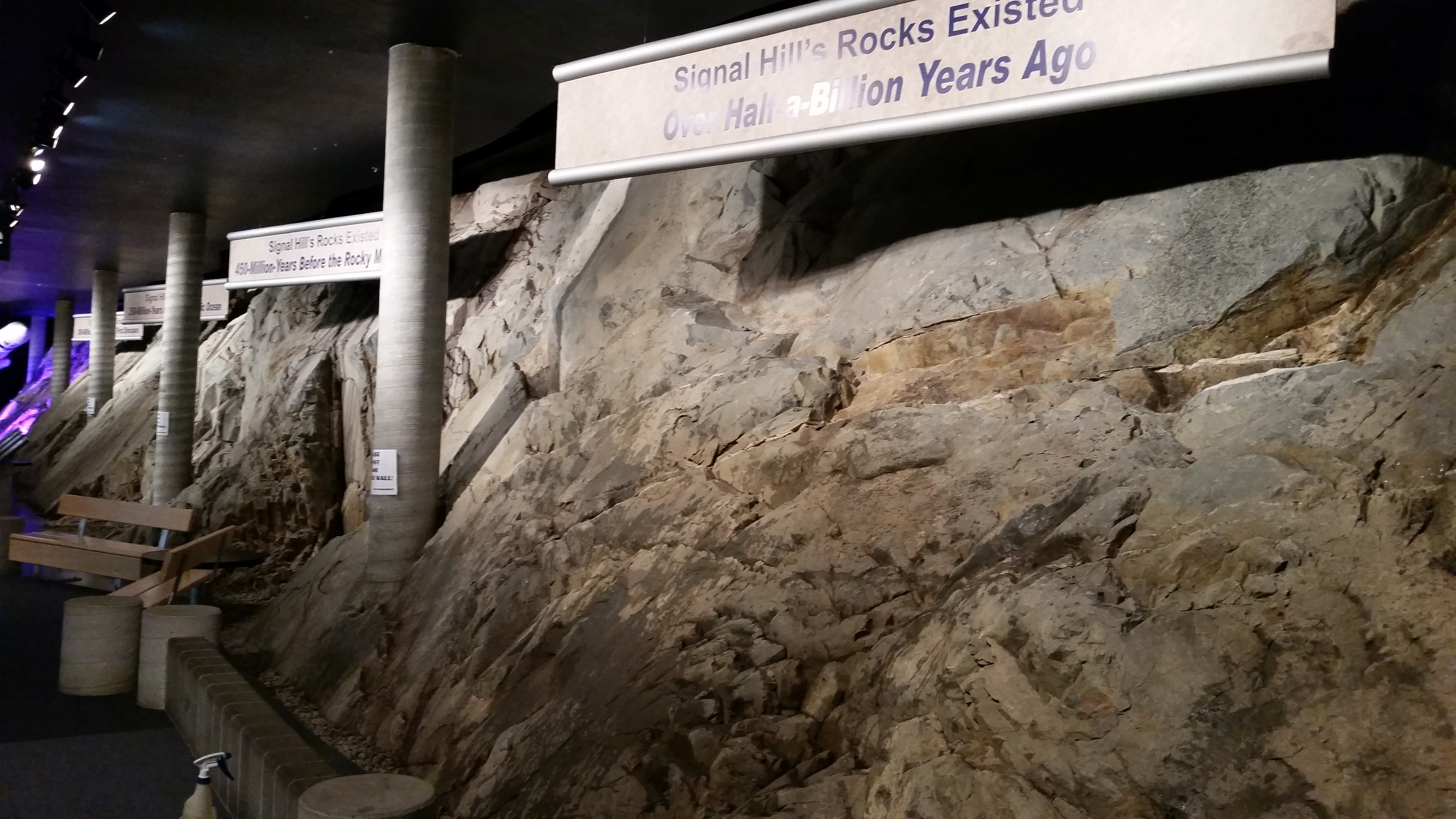
Johnson Geo Centre exposure of the Upper Precambrian Gibbett Hill Formation, a greenish gray sandstone, siltstone and tuff

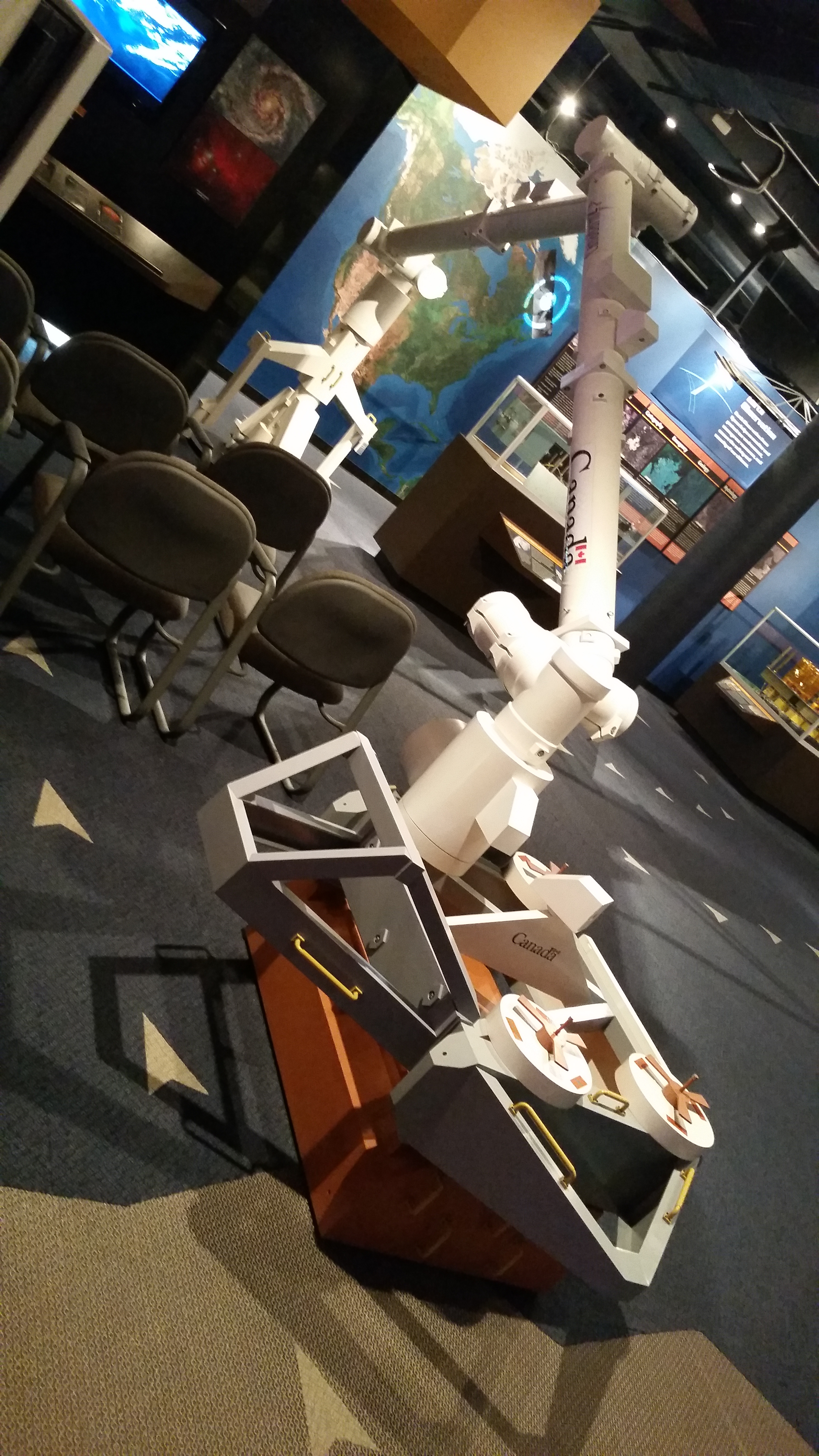
Johnson Geo Centre space exhibit

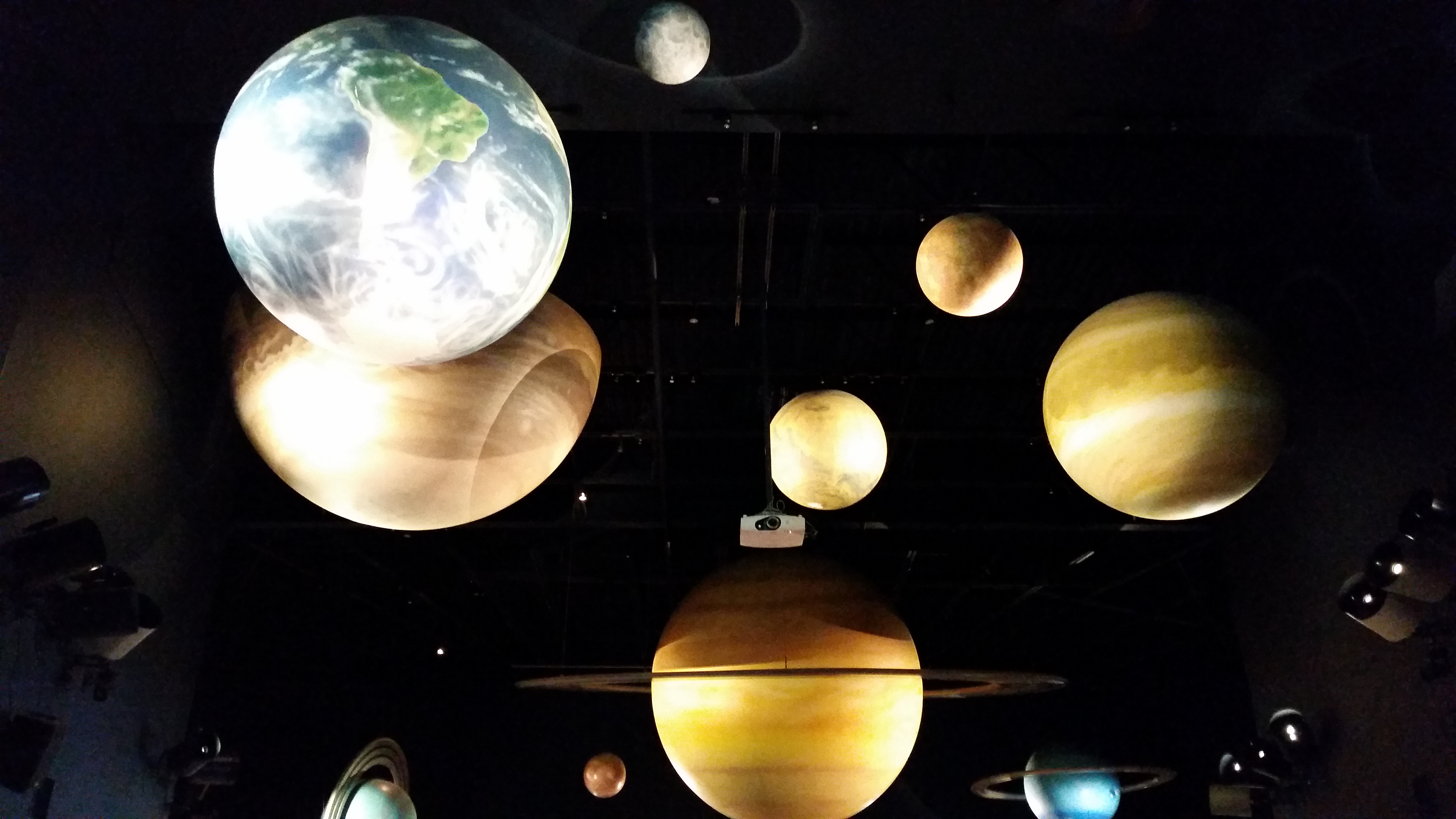
Johnson Geo Centre solar system exhibit

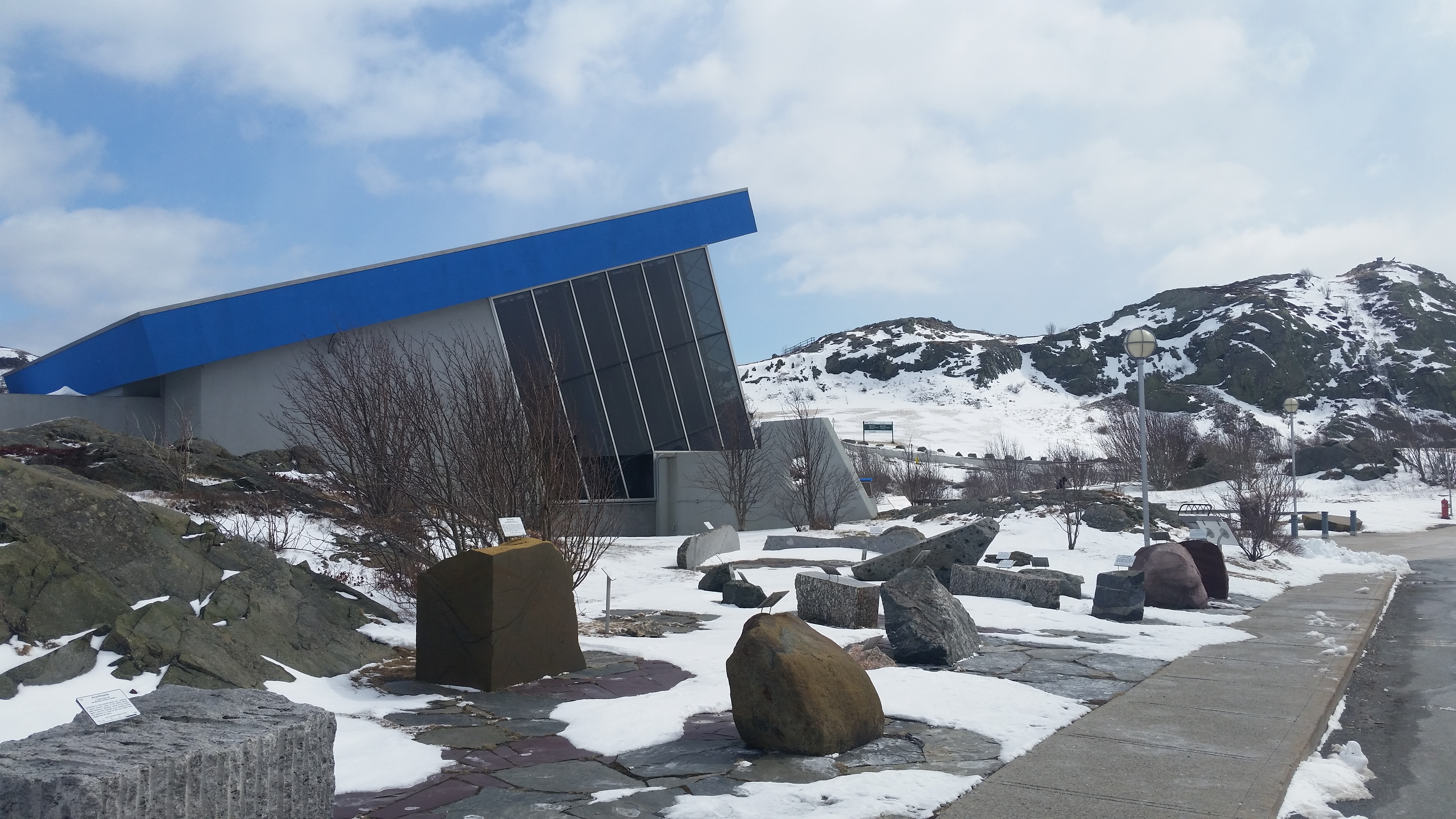
Johnson Geo Centre rock garden
