= Cabot Tower =

Cabot Tower may refer to one of two towers, both named after John Cabot:

- Cabot Tower, Bristol, England
- Cabot Tower (St. John's), Newfoundland, Canada
