= Railway Coastal Museum =

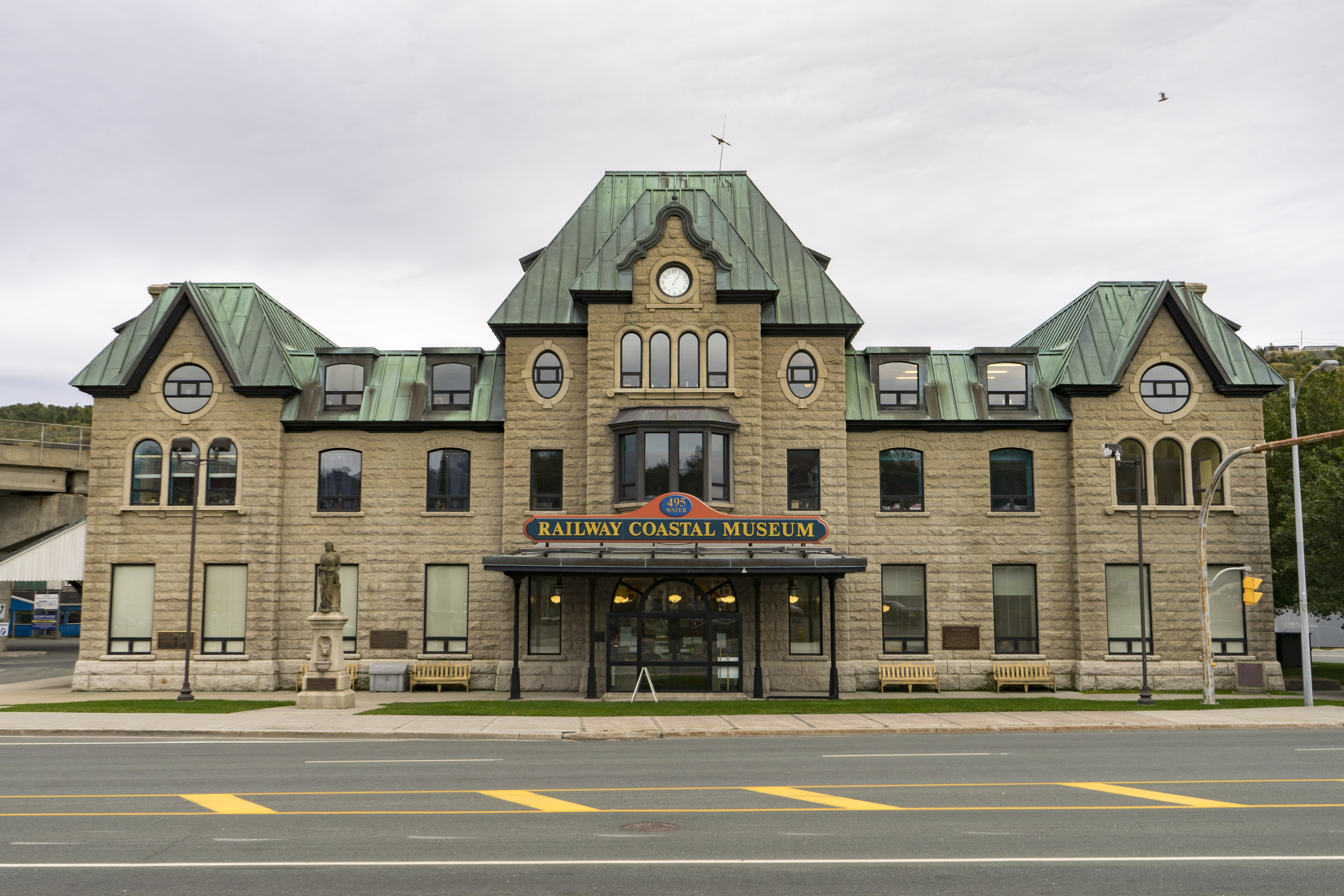
- Established: 2003
- Location: 495 Water Street; St. John's, Newfoundland and Labrador; A1E 6B5
- Coordinates: 47°33′16″N 52°42′49″W
- Type: Railway museum
- Website: www.railwaycoastalmuseum.com

National Historic Site of Canada
- Official name: Former Newfoundland Railway Headquarters National Historic Site of Canada
- Designated: 1988

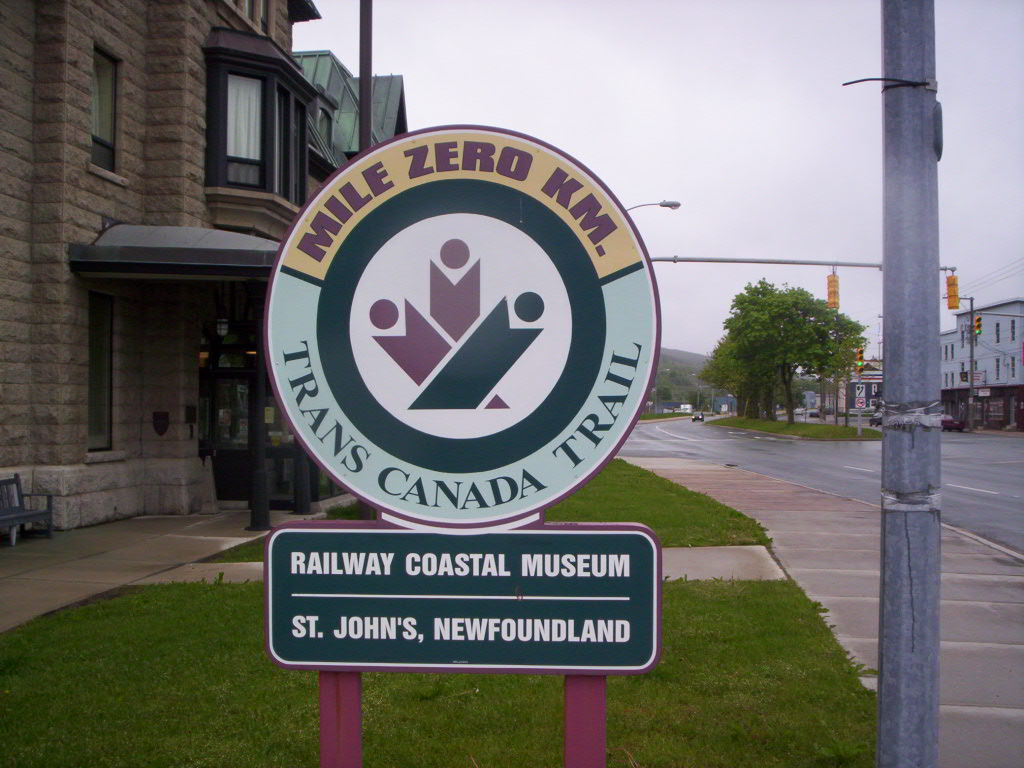
Mile Zero Signpost at the Railway Coastal Museum

The Railway Coastal Museum is a transport museum located in St. John's, Newfoundland and Labrador, Canada. It is located in the historic Newfoundland Railway terminal on Water Street and contains exhibits detailing the history of the Newfoundland Railway and the history of coastal water transportation in the province.

The building was designated a National Historic Site in 1988 for its role in commemorating the important role played by the Newfoundland Railway in the social, economic and political history of the province. It was also designated a Heritage Railway Station in 1990.

The museum has 40 themed exhibits, a virtual museum, artwork and displays highlighting the history of the railway beds in Newfoundland and Labrador.

The museum opened in 2003 on a grant from the Johnson Family Foundation, which later turned over the museum to the City of St. John's. The museum is also noteworthy as "Mile Zero" of the Trans-Canada Trail. In 2020, it was announced by St. John's City Council that the museum would close due to budget cuts. In 2021, it was announced that the museum would be purchased by the Genesis Coworking Centre affiliated with the Memorial University-owned incubator Genesis Centre. The Railway Coastal Museum will continue on a seasonal basis.

With the closure of the Newfoundland Railway, the terminal is no longer connected to any tracks, which were all torn up and the rails put to other uses. The museum does not own or display any rolling stock as it is now surrounded by development.

The museum is affiliated with: CMA, CHIN, and Virtual Museum of Canada.

Locations on the island with cars:

- Port aux Basques - cars and station
- Corner Brook - cars at Railway Society Of Newfoundland
- Bishop's Falls - cars
- Carbonear - museum
- Avondale - track used for trolleys
- Trinity Train Loop (Trinity) - functional section of track and museum
- Lewisporte - train cars
- Whitbourne - station

== See also ==
- Canadian National Railways
- Canadian Register of Historic Places
- List of heritage railways in Canada
