= Grand Concourse (St. John's) =

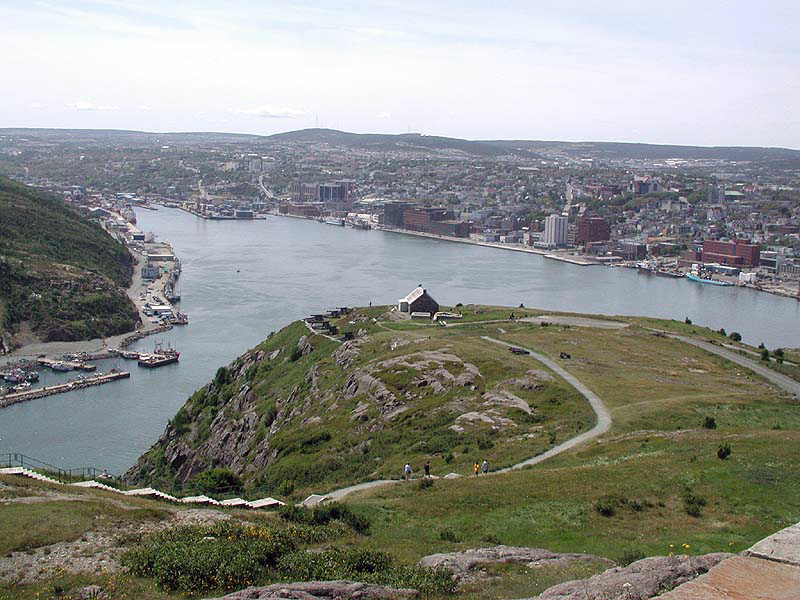
Lake-to-Lookout Walk near Queen's Battery, Signal Hill. The path begins at Quidi Vidi Lake.

The Grand Concourse is an integrated walkway and green space network connecting 10 municipalities in the Province of Newfoundland and Labrador. It has over 200 kilometers (120 mi) of walkways linking every major park, river, pond, and green space in the Northeast Avalon region. The Grand Concourse is managed by the Grand Concourse Authority, a non-profit organization with a board of directors made up of representatives from a variety of community-based and government groups.

== Origins ==
The Grand Concourse was first developed through the generosity of the Johnson Family Foundation with Paul Johnson as its president and founder. A series of studies commissioned between 1989 and 1992 by the Foundation established the feasibility of connecting walks and parks via the publicly owned shorelines of aquatic networks throughout the St. John's Urban Region. Trails had already been built by St. John's, the Province of Newfoundland and Labrador, Parks Canada, and the Quidi Vidi/Rennie's River Development Foundation, providing a start for the Grand Concourse. Four demonstration Walkways were built by the Johnson Family Foundation:

- Lake-to-Lookout
- Cuckold Cove (from Signal Hill to Quidi Vidi Lake)
- Rennie's River to Memorial University
- Riverdale to Memorial University

An overall plan was developed to extend the Walkway Network from Signal Hill in the east, to Octagon Pond in the west. This plan was completed in 2004 but efforts continue by involved members to maintain and further develop the Grand Concourse.

== The Grand Concourse Authority ==
In 1994, the Grand Concourse Authority (GCA) was established under a Provincial Charter with a mandate to design and construct the Grand Concourse. It is a charitable, non-profit organization, currently comprising 15 member groups who contribute funds for operations. Members have included Crown Corporations, Community Organizations, and all levels of Government.

Together the Members of the GCA have completed over 350 community-development projects since 1994. As of 2006, the cost to construct the Walkway Network was well over $27 million.

Today, the GCA runs an extensive maintenance program, primarily in the City of St. John's, while continuing walkway expansion throughout the Northeast Avalon Region of Newfoundland. The Authority also participates in various environmental initiatives, open space and park development projects, as well as promotion and public education

== List of Members ==
The following municipalities, agencies, crown corporations, and organizations make up the Board of the Grand Concourse Authority:

- City of St. John's
- City of Mount Pearl
- Town of Paradise
- Town of Conception Bay South
- Town of Portugal Cove-St. Philip's
- Town of Torbay
- Town of Logy Bay-Middle Cove-Outer Cove
- Town of Flatrock
- Town of Pouch Cove
- Town of Bay Bulls
- Bowring Park Foundation
- Johnson Family Foundation
- Manuels River
- Memorial University of Newfoundland and Labrador
- C.A. Pippy Park Commission
- St. John's Port Authority
- Suncor Energy Fluvarium

== List of Grand Concourse Walks ==
The following walkways and trails are considered part of the Grand Concourse network:

Trail/Walkway	Area
Signal Hill - North Head Trail	Signal Hill National Historic Site
Ladies Lookout Trail	Signal Hill National Historic Site
Cuckolds Cove Trail	St. John's
Signal Hill Road	St. John's
Johnson GEO-Vista Park	St. John's
Battery-Signal Hill Walk	St. John's
Lake to Lookout Walk	St. John's
Quidi Vidi Lake Trail	St. John's
Harbourside Walk East	St. John's
Harbourside Walk North	St. John's
Harbourside Walk South	St. John's
Old St. John's Business Streets Walk	St. John's
Military-Rennies-Circular-King's Bridge Walk	St. John's
Heritage Walk Loop	St. John's
Virginia River Trail	St. John's
Clovelly Trail	St. John's
Kenny's Pond to Virginia River	St. John's
Kenny's Pond	St. John's
Kents Pond	Pippy Park
Kents Pond to Long Pond Walk	Pippy Park
Confederation Hill	Pippy Park
Trailer Park to Marine Institute	Pippy Park
Long Pond Walk North	Pippy Park
Long Pond Walk South	Memorial University
Rennies River North	Pippy Park
Rennies River South	St. John's
Elizabeth Avenue-Prince Philip East Walk	St. John's
Elizabeth Avenue-Prince Philip West Walk	St. John's
Pinebud Park	St. John's
MUN Visitors Walk	Memorial University
Long Pond to Oxen Pond	Pippy Park
Oxen Pond to Wishingwell	Pippy Park
Mundy Pond	St. John's
Waterford River Walk (T'Railway)	St. John's
Caribou Hill Park	St. John's
South Brook	St. John's
Southlands	St. John's
Bidgood Park	St. John's
Rotary Sunshine Park	St. John's
Harbourside Park to Kent's Pond Link	St. John's
Elizabeth to Courthouse Link	St. John's
Elizabeth to Queens Road Link	St. John's
Mundy Pond to Waterford Link	St. John's
Mundy Pond to Bowring Park Link	St. John's
Mundy Pond-Cowan-Bowring Link	St. John's
Riverdale to Mundy Pond Link	St. John's
Arboretum Walk (T'Railway)	Mount Pearl
Branscombes Pond	Mount Pearl
Admiralty Walk	Mount Pearl
Sunrise Trail	Mount Pearl
Waterford Valley Linear Trail	Mount Pearl
Paradise T'Railway	Paradise
Elizabeth Park	Paradise
Neils Pond	Paradise
Octagon Pond	Paradise
Peter Barry Duff Memorial Park	Paradise
Adam's Pond	Paradise
Conception Bay South T'Railway	Conception Bay South
Manuels River Trail	Conception Bay South
Gateway Trail	Conception Bay South
Voisey's Brook Park	Portugal Cove - St. Philip's
Rainbow Gully Park	Portugal Cove - St. Philip's
Upper Three Corner Pond Park	Torbay
Western Island Pond	Torbay
Island Pond Brook	Torbay
Woodbridge Park / Forest River	Torbay

== Awards and Accolades ==
- Canadian Parks and Recreation Association, 2001 - Award for Excellence in Innovation.
- Newfoundland T'Railway Council, 2001 - Trailblazer of the Year Award.
- St. John's Clean and Beautiful, Community Organization Award 2003 - Harbourside Park.
- Historic Sites Association of Newfoundland and Labrador, Manning Heritage Award 2003 (Shared) - Bishop Spencer School Memorial.
- Canadian Society of Landscape Architects, National Honour Award 2003.
- CSLA Regional Honour Award 2004 - Bowring Park Duck Pond Rehabilitation Project.
- CSLA Regional Citation Award 2005 - Walkway Maintenance Manual.
- American Society of Landscape Architects 2005 - National Honor Award.
- Canadian Institute of Planners, 2011 - Vision in Planning Award.
