= Signal Hill, St. John's =

Historic site in Canada

Signal Hill
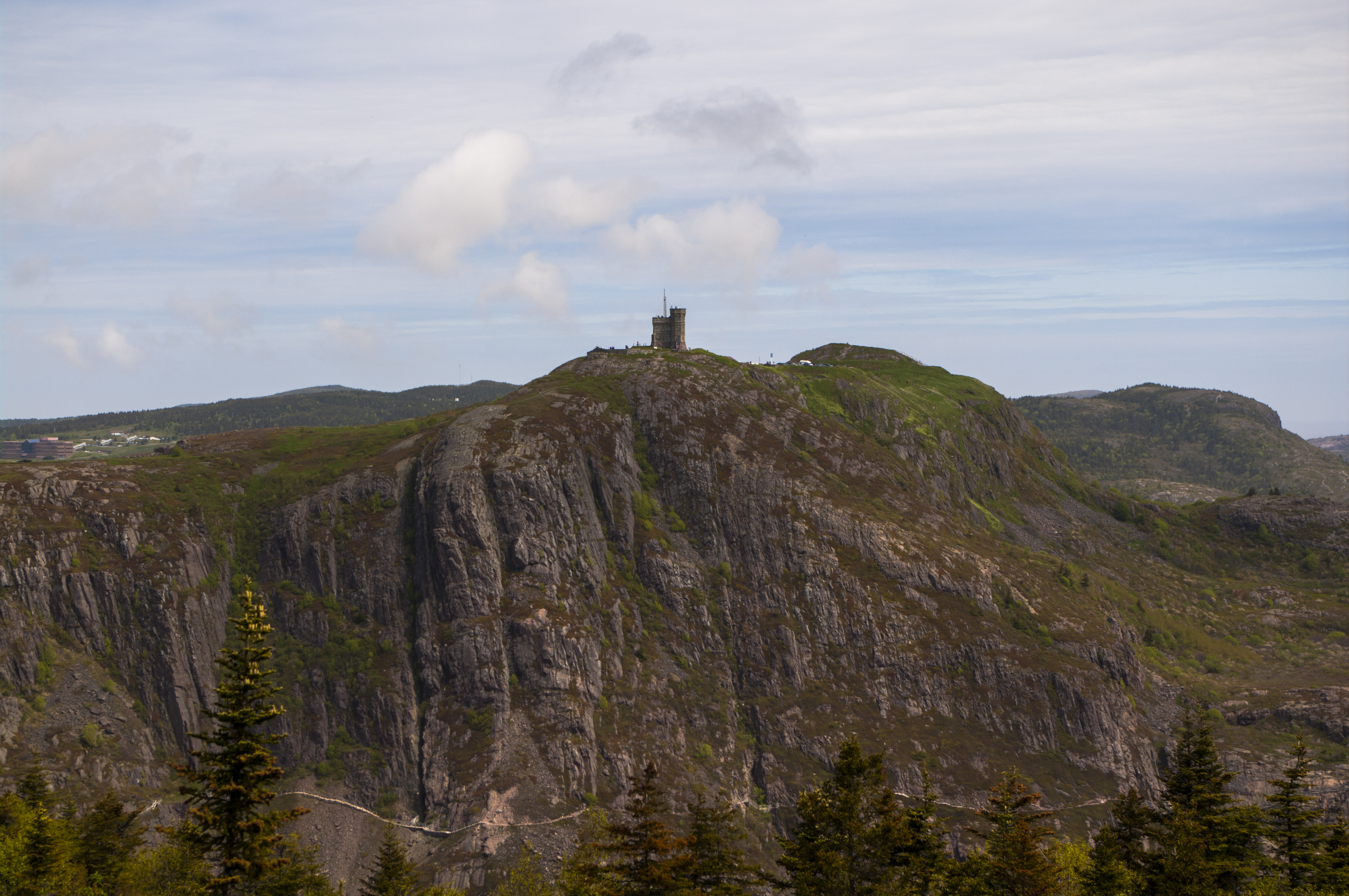
- Cabot Tower on Signal Hill, 2011
- Interactive map of Signal Hill
- 47°34′25″N 52°41′01″W
- Location: St. John's, Newfoundland and Labrador, Canada

Site notes
- Governing body: Parks Canada
- Website: Signal Hill National Historic Site

National Historic Site of Canada

Signal Hill

Highest point
- Elevation: 167 m (548 ft)
- Prominence: c. 167 m (548 ft)

Geography
- Location: St. John's

Climbing
- Easiest route: hillwalking

Signal Hill is a hill which overlooks the harbour and city of St. John's, Newfoundland and Labrador, Canada. The majority of Signal Hill, including Cabot Tower, is designated a National Historic Site. The highest point, Ladies' Lookout, is 167 m (548 ft) high.

Due to its strategic placement overlooking the Narrows, the only entrance to the harbour, fortifications date back to the mid 17th century. On 12 December 1901, the first transatlantic Wireless transmission was received there by Guglielmo Marconi.

Adjacent to the National Historic site is the Johnson Geo Centre and Johnson Geo Vista Park. The community of The Battery lies on the slope of the hill overlooking the harbour, and Memorial University of Newfoundland has a campus on the lower slopes, in the former Battery Hotel.

== History ==
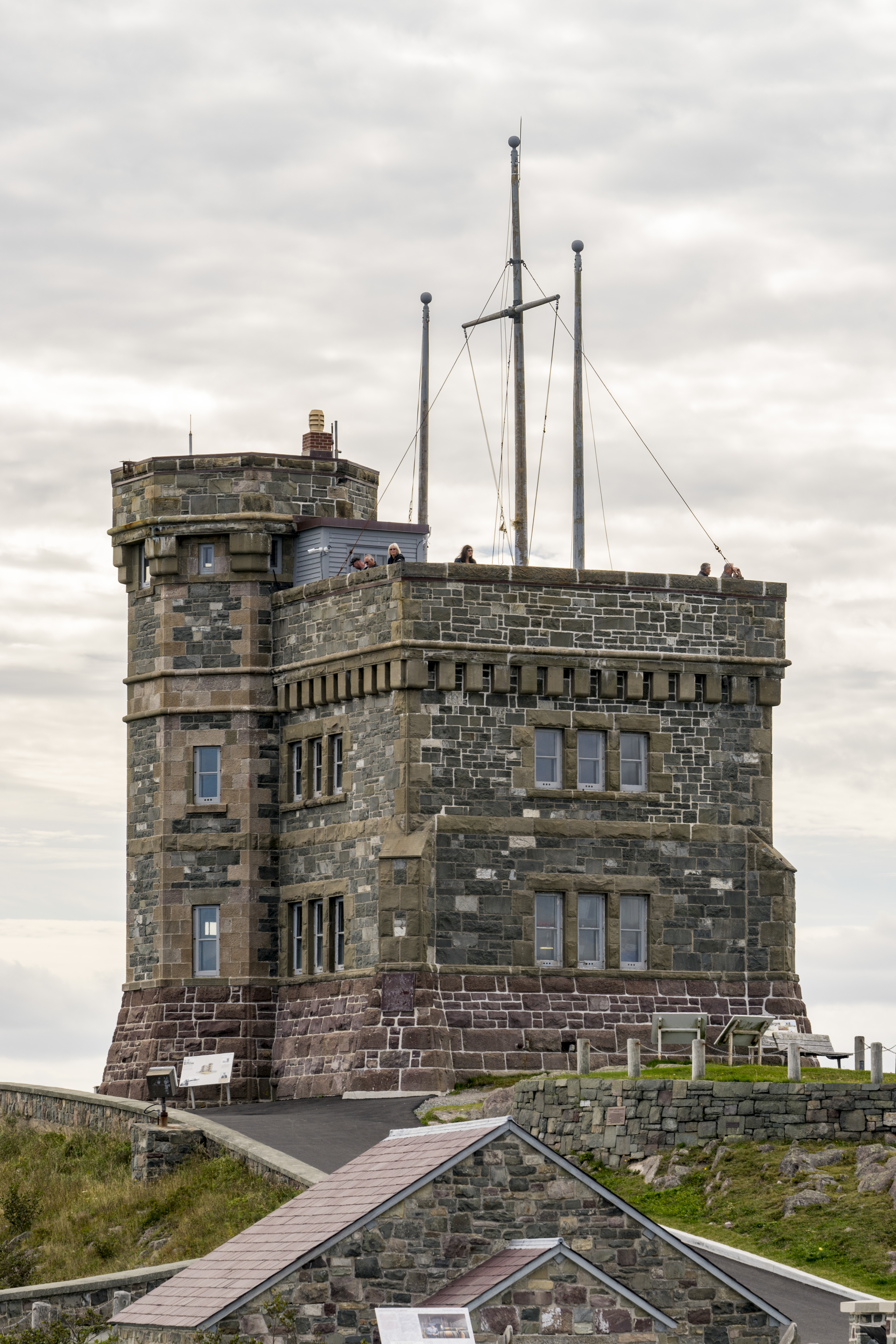
Cabot Tower on Signal Hill

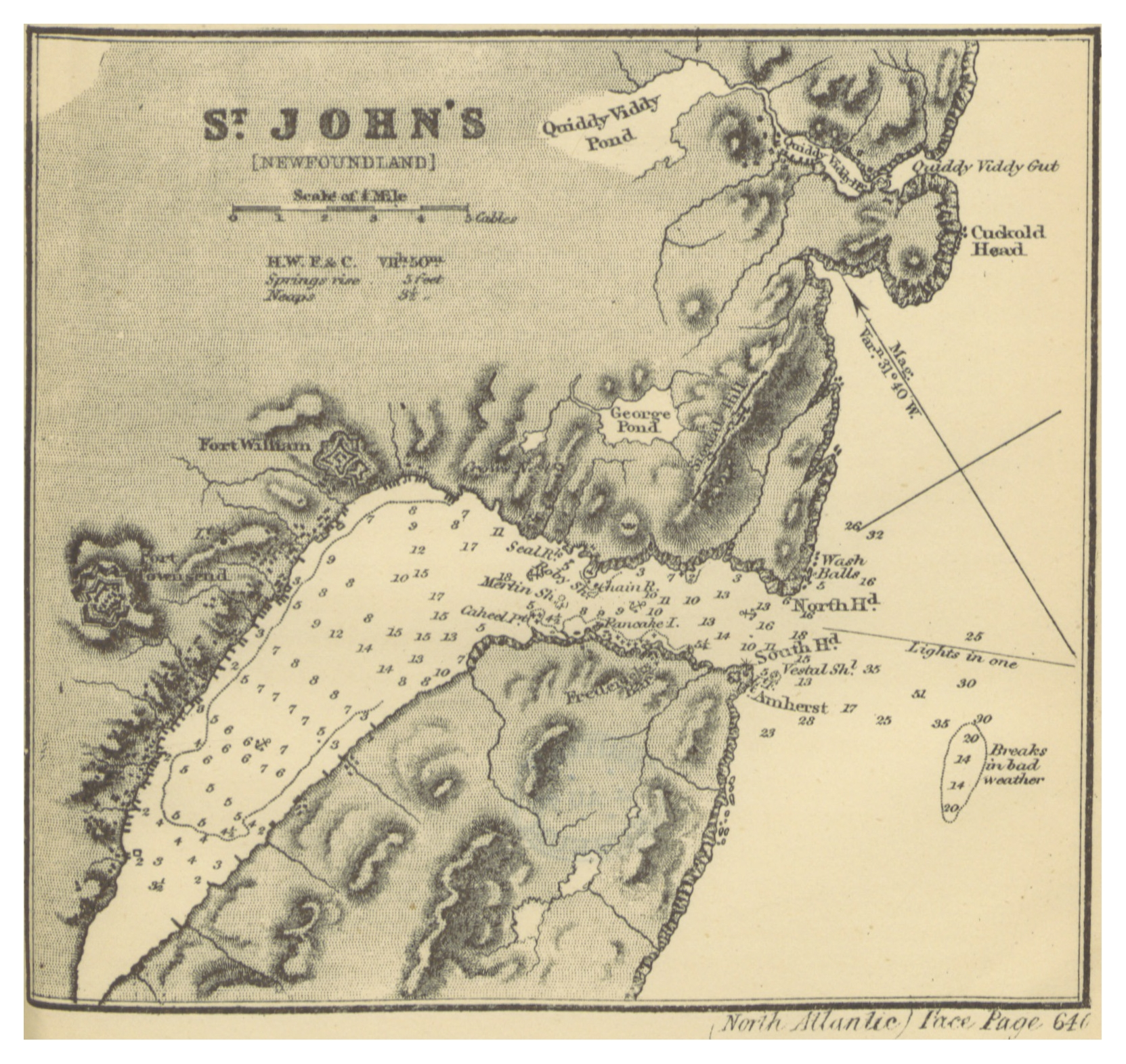
Map of St. John's (1869), The Harbour, fortifications Fort William and Fort Townsend

The final battle of the Seven Years' War in North America was fought in 1762 at the Battle of Signal Hill, in which the French surrendered St. John's to a British force under the command of Lieutenant Colonel William Amherst, who renamed what was then known as "The Lookout" as "Signal Hill," because of the signalling that took place upon its summit from its flagmast. Flag communication between land and sea would take place there from the 17th century until 1960.

Signal Hill was designated as the citadel for St. John's during its first construction period in the late 18th century.

During the 19th century, Signal Hill was manned specifically during the Napoleonic Wars and the American Civil War. A second construction period in Signal Hill's history saw the construction of the Queen's Battery Barracks, which has been completely restored to the period of 1862.

Construction on Cabot Tower began in 1897 to commemorate both the Diamond Jubilee of Queen Victoria in 1897 and the 400th anniversary of John Cabot's landfall which took place in 1497. The building was declared officially open in 1900. The practical uses of the building were flag mast signalling, and a Marconi wireless station which has since been moved to St. John's International Airport.

On 12 December 1901, the first transatlantic Wireless transmission was received by Guglielmo Marconi in the abandoned fever and diphtheria hospital, which has since been destroyed by fire. The transmission, in Morse code, originated from his Poldhu Wireless Station, Cornwall, United Kingdom.

The United States maintained anti-aircraft guns on the hill during World War II. A battery of two 8-inch M1888 railway guns was emplaced there on 1 May 1941, but relocated to Red Cliff circa 1943. Signal Hill was also one of three prepared sites for a battery of two 155 mm guns on Panama mounts.

== Signal Hill National Historic Site ==
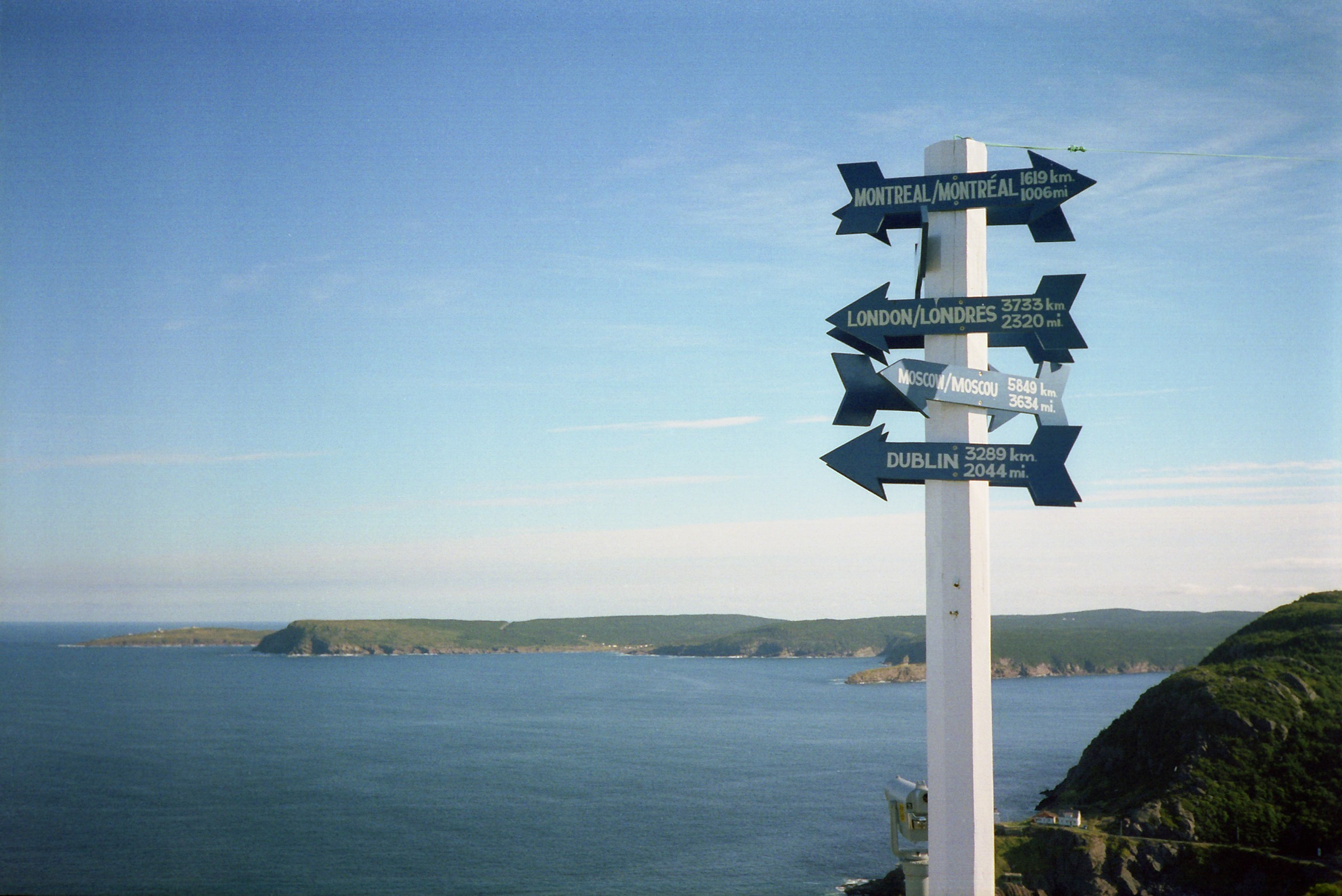
Directional signs on Signal Hill

Signal Hill is a National Historic Site.

=== Signal Hill Tattoo ===
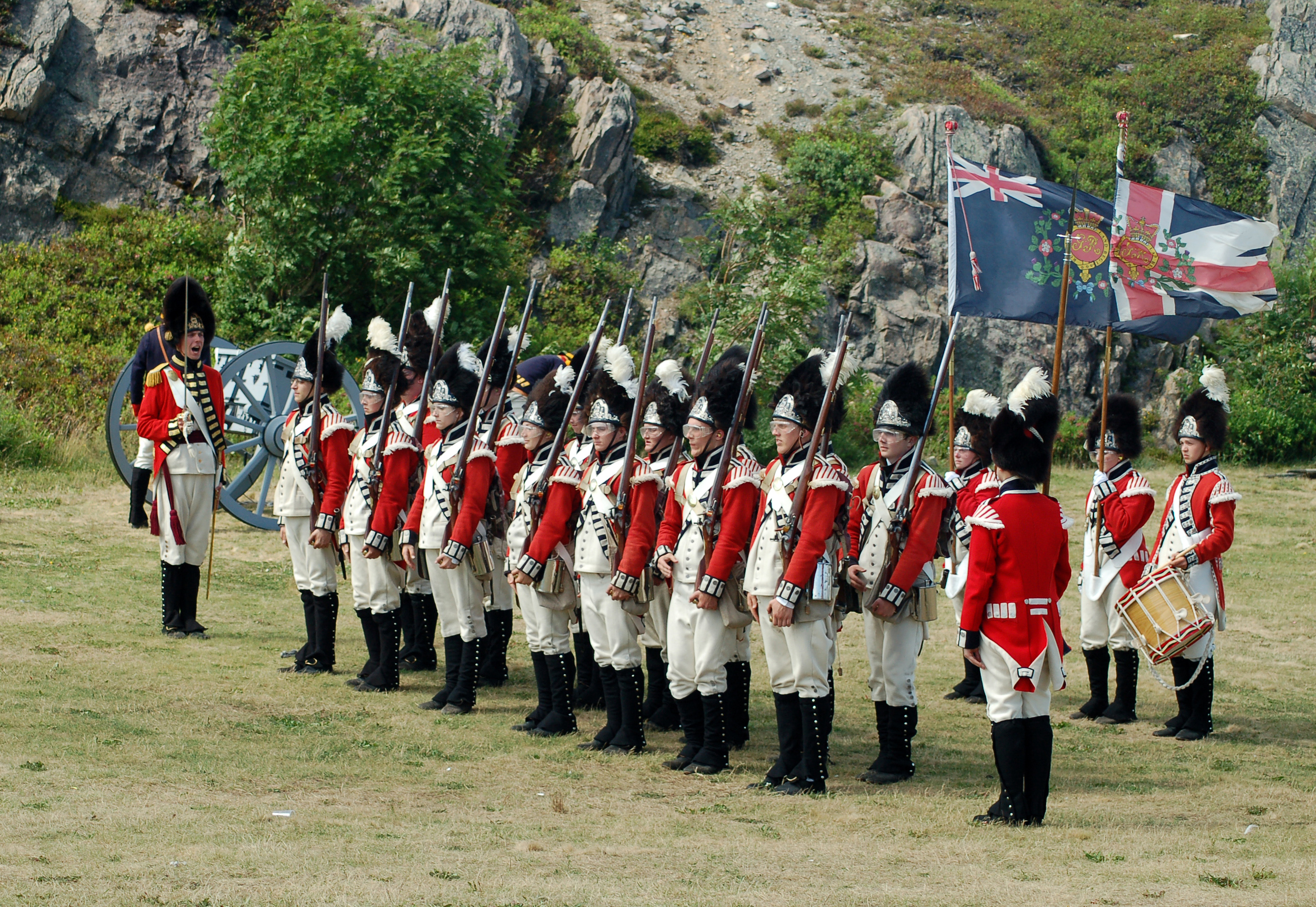
Reenactors dressed in uniform of the Newfoundland Regiment c 1795 at Signal Hill Tattoo

The Signal Hill Tattoo showcases the Royal Newfoundland Regiment of Foot from 1812, the Royal Newfoundland Regiment Band from 1795, and the Royal Newfoundland Regiment of 1917. Wearing full military uniforms from each period, the soldiers give a display by each section and portray the drills and battle tactics of the time. The Artillery provide an exhibition of cannon fire to add to the program.

=== Cabot Tower ===
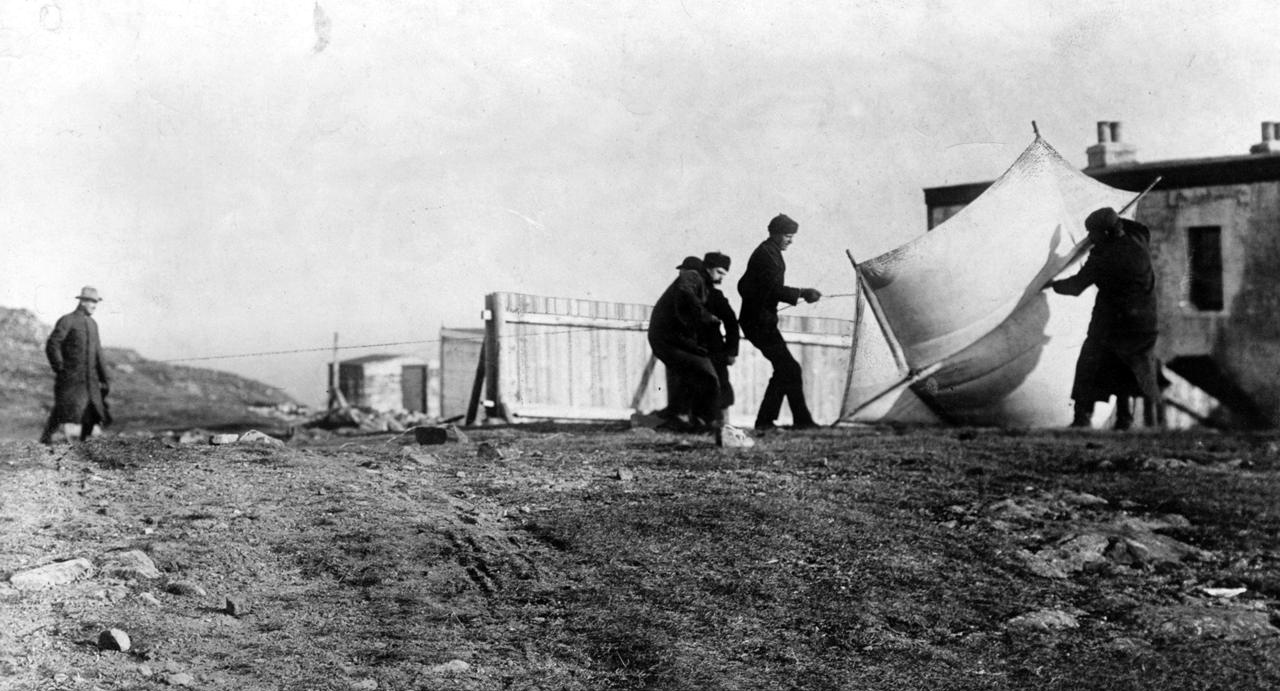
Marconi watching associates raise kite antenna at Signal Hill, December 1901

Cabot Tower, located at the top of the hill, features exhibits about Guglielmo Marconi and the wireless station that operated in the tower. There is a gift shop, and an amateur radio station VO1AA, which may be operated by visiting amateur radio operators in the summer months. It is sponsored by the Society of Newfoundland Radio Amateurs. An active amateur radio repeater, VO1AAA 146.790+, is located inside the building and is operational year round. A tourist information radio station, CJSH-FM, also broadcasts from the Signal Hill site.

=== Visitor Centre ===
The visitor centre is open during the tourist season and features interactive exhibits, a film about the site's military and communications history, and the history of St. John's, along with a cafe.

== Trails ==
The North Head Trail is located along the edge of St John's Harbour and the sea. The Lady's Lookout Trail descends steeply from Lady's Lookout, above Cabot Tower, the highest point of Signal Hill, to the Burma Road trail. There is also a short trail to the summit of Gibbet Hill.

The Burma Road trail, built by American servicemen who manned coastal batteries on Signal Hill during the Second World War, runs from George's Pond, Signal Hill Road to Cuckold's Cove, close to Quidi Vidi. Along it there were barracks.

There are eight looped trails in the Johnson GEO Park with informative outdoor displays. Stoneworks and panels explain the local geological formations, botanical species, and traditional uses of stone. Completed in 2007, the park surrounds the Geo Centre and includes Deadman's Pond across the road. Both the Geo Park's and Signal National Historic Park's trails are linked to the Grand Concourse walkway system.

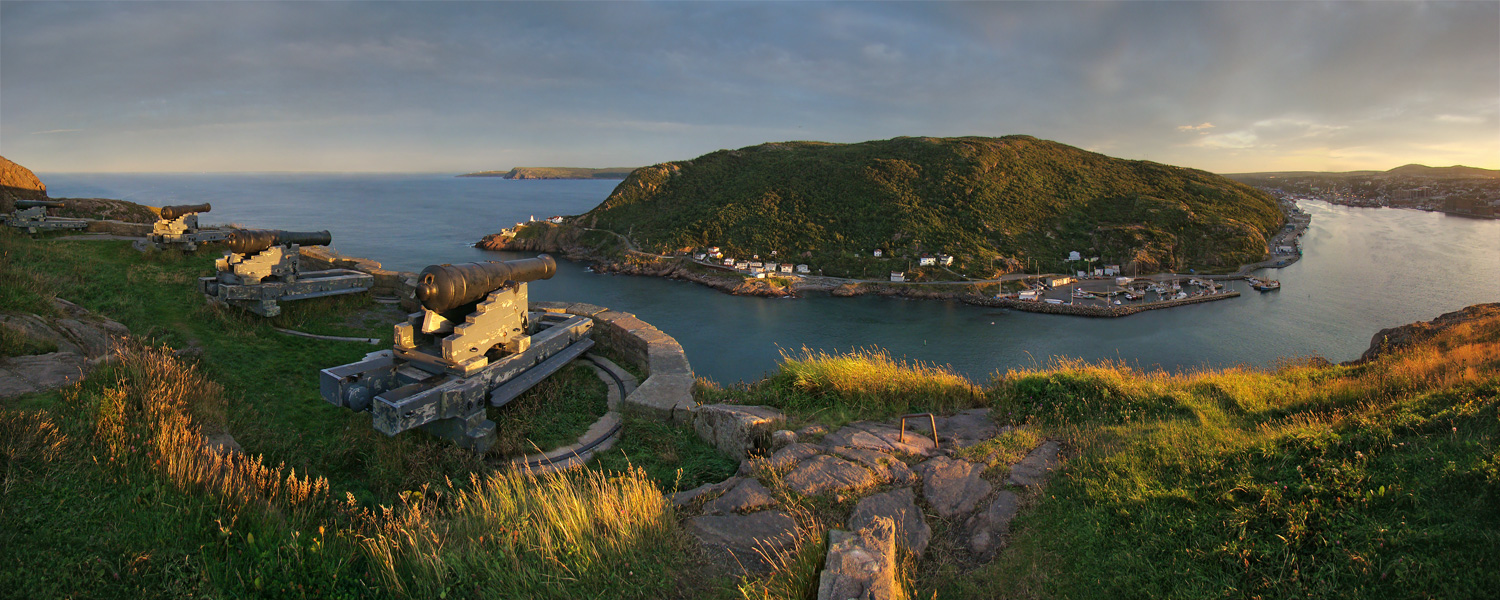
View from Signal Hill

== Climate ==
Climate data for Signal Hill Climate ID:: 8403669; coordinates 47°24′N 52°41′W; elevation: 96.0 m (315.0 ft); 1981–2010 normals
Month	Jan	Feb	Mar	Apr	May	Jun	Jul	Aug	Sep	Oct	Nov	Dec	Year
Record high °C (°F)	16.0 (60.8)	15.5 (59.9)	15.0 (59.0)	22.0 (71.6)	25.0 (77.0)	29.0 (84.2)	29.5 (85.1)	31.5 (88.7)	28.5 (83.3)	23.0 (73.4)	19.0 (66.2)	14.0 (57.2)	31.5 (88.7)
Mean daily maximum °C (°F)	−0.5 (31.1)	−0.9 (30.4)	1.5 (34.7)	5.3 (41.5)	10.6 (51.1)	15.4 (59.7)	19.8 (67.6)	20.2 (68.4)	16.1 (61.0)	10.6 (51.1)	6.0 (42.8)	1.5 (34.7)	8.8 (47.8)
Daily mean °C (°F)	−4.2 (24.4)	−4.7 (23.5)	−2.0 (28.4)	2.0 (35.6)	6.4 (43.5)	10.9 (51.6)	15.3 (59.5)	16.2 (61.2)	12.5 (54.5)	7.5 (45.5)	3.1 (37.6)	−1.5 (29.3)	5.1 (41.2)
Mean daily minimum °C (°F)	−7.9 (17.8)	−8.4 (16.9)	−5.4 (22.3)	−1.3 (29.7)	2.1 (35.8)	6.3 (43.3)	10.9 (51.6)	12.2 (54.0)	8.9 (48.0)	4.4 (39.9)	0.1 (32.2)	−4.5 (23.9)	1.4 (34.5)
Record low °C (°F)	−20.0 (−4.0)	−23.0 (−9.4)	−23.0 (−9.4)	−11.5 (11.3)	−10.0 (14.0)	−2.0 (28.4)	3.0 (37.4)	4.0 (39.2)	0.0 (32.0)	−10.0 (14.0)	−12.5 (9.5)	−26.0 (−14.8)	−26.0 (−14.8)
Average precipitation mm (inches)	109.7 (4.32)	106.8 (4.20)	98.0 (3.86)	104.1 (4.10)	88.4 (3.48)	83.3 (3.28)	82.7 (3.26)	84.4 (3.32)	101.4 (3.99)	133.0 (5.24)	126.7 (4.99)	123.2 (4.85)	1,241.7 (48.89)
Average rainfall mm (inches)	50.8 (2.00)	51.9 (2.04)	64.3 (2.53)	85.3 (3.36)	85.8 (3.38)	83.3 (3.28)	82.7 (3.26)	84.4 (3.32)	101.4 (3.99)	133.0 (5.24)	112.7 (4.44)	72.2 (2.84)	1,007.9 (39.68)
Average snowfall cm (inches)	58.9 (23.2)	54.9 (21.6)	33.7 (13.3)	18.9 (7.4)	2.6 (1.0)	0.0 (0.0)	0.0 (0.0)	0.0 (0.0)	0.0 (0.0)	0.0 (0.0)	14.0 (5.5)	50.9 (20.0)	233.9 (92.1)
Average precipitation days (≥ 0.2 mm)	12.9	12.5	12.9	12.9	13.3	13.0	12.7	12.9	14.0	17.4	16.3	15.1	165.8
Average rainy days (≥ 0.2 mm)	5.3	5.9	8.1	10.4	12.9	13.0	12.7	12.9	14.0	17.3	14.6	8.8	136.0
Average snowy days (≥ 0.2 cm)	8.1	8.1	5.8	3.1	0.6	0.0	0.0	0.0	0.0	0.1	2.3	7.1	35.1
Source: Environment and Climate Change Canada

== See also ==
- United Irish Uprising in Newfoundland

== Bibliography ==
- Zierler, Amy, and Cam Mustard, Signal Hill: An Illustrated History, 1982, reprint 1997, Newfoundland Historic Parks Association, St. John's.
- Canadian Heritage - Parks Canada, Welcome to Signal Hill National Historic Site brochure, undated (2000 ?).
