= Cabot Tower (St. John's) =

Signal tower in Newfoundland, Canada

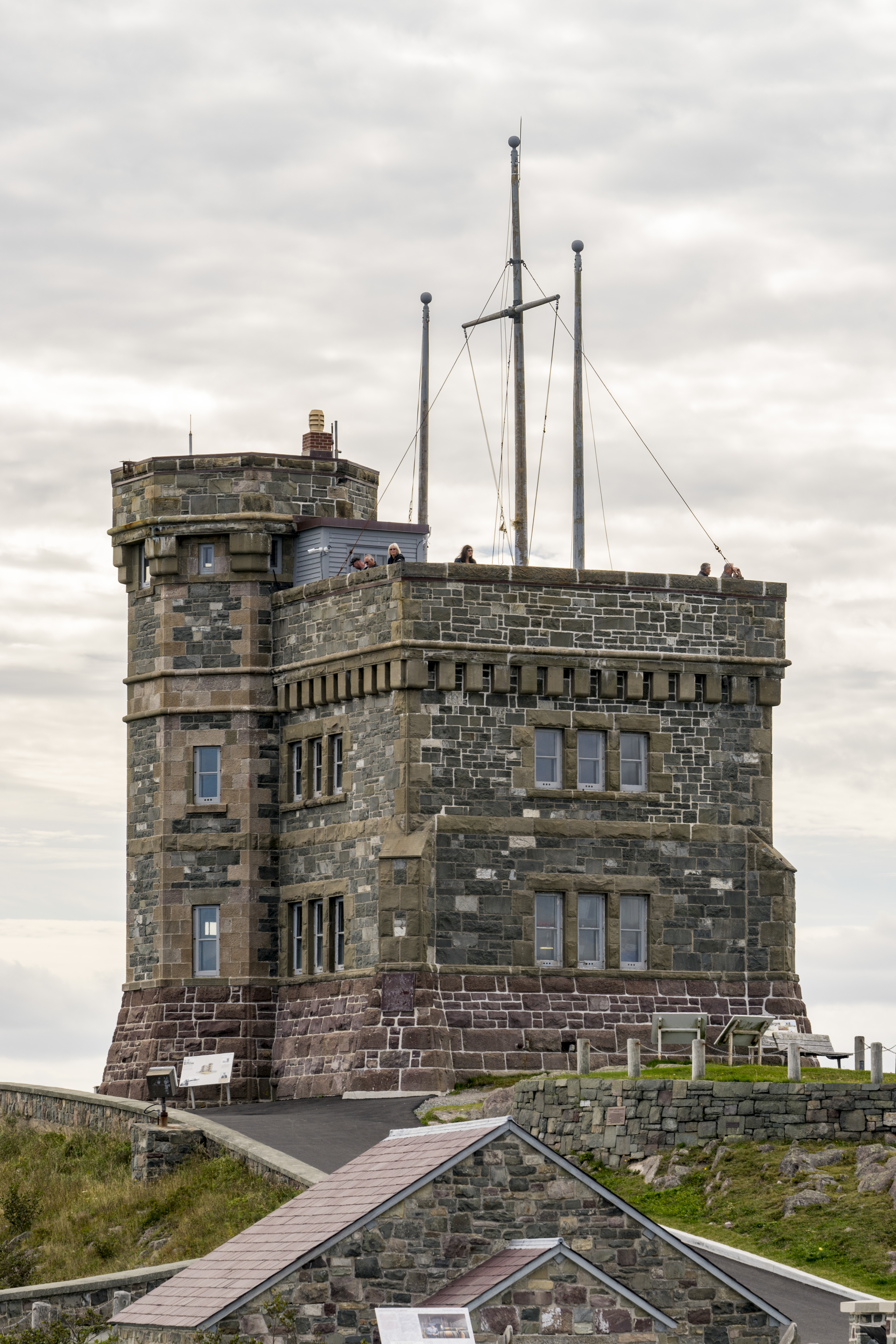

- Location within Newfoundland

General information
- Architectural style: Gothic Revival
- Location: St. John's, Newfoundland and Labrador, Canada
- Coordinates: NL_type:landmark 47°34′12.05″N 52°40′54.38″W
- Groundbreaking: 1898
- Completed: 1900

Height
- Height: 50 feet (15 m)

Design and construction
- Architect: William Howe Greene
- Main contractor: Henry J Thomas

Cabot Tower is a tower in St. John's, Newfoundland and Labrador, situated on Signal Hill. Construction of the tower began in 1898 to commemorate the 400th anniversary of John Cabot's landing in Newfoundland, and Queen Victoria's Diamond Jubilee.

In 1901, Guglielmo Marconi received the first trans-Atlantic wireless message at a position near the tower, the letter "S" in Morse Code sent from Poldhu, Cornwall, United Kingdom. Cabot Tower is now the centre of the Signal Hill National Historic Site of Canada, with walking trails and an interpretation centre.

== History ==
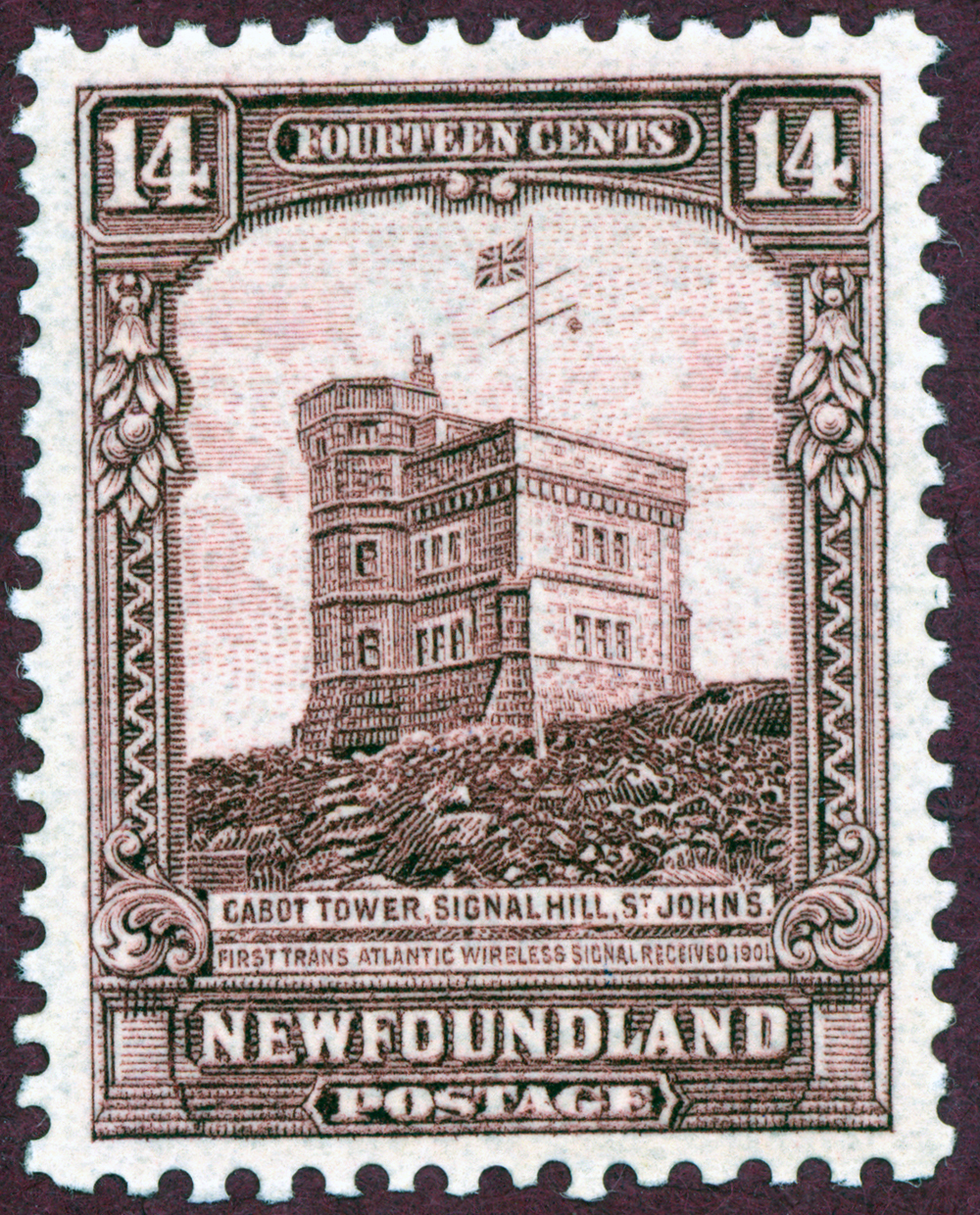
Cabot Tower postage stamp

Begun in 1898, to commemorate both Queen Victoria's Diamond Jubilee and the 400th anniversary of John Cabot's (Giovanni Caboto) voyage to the New World, Cabot Tower was completed in 1900 and has been a part of a number of historic events. Although now one of the most recognizable symbols of St. John's and Newfoundland and Labrador, its construction was not well supported in the town. Most of St. John's burned to the ground in 1892 and the banks in Newfoundland crashed in 1894. When Judge D.W. Prowse, a prominent local man, suggested building Cabot Tower, one person said in a local paper that "it's like putting a silk hat on the head of a man who can't afford to buy a pair of boots." Another project, the Victoria Wing of the local hospital, received much more public support.

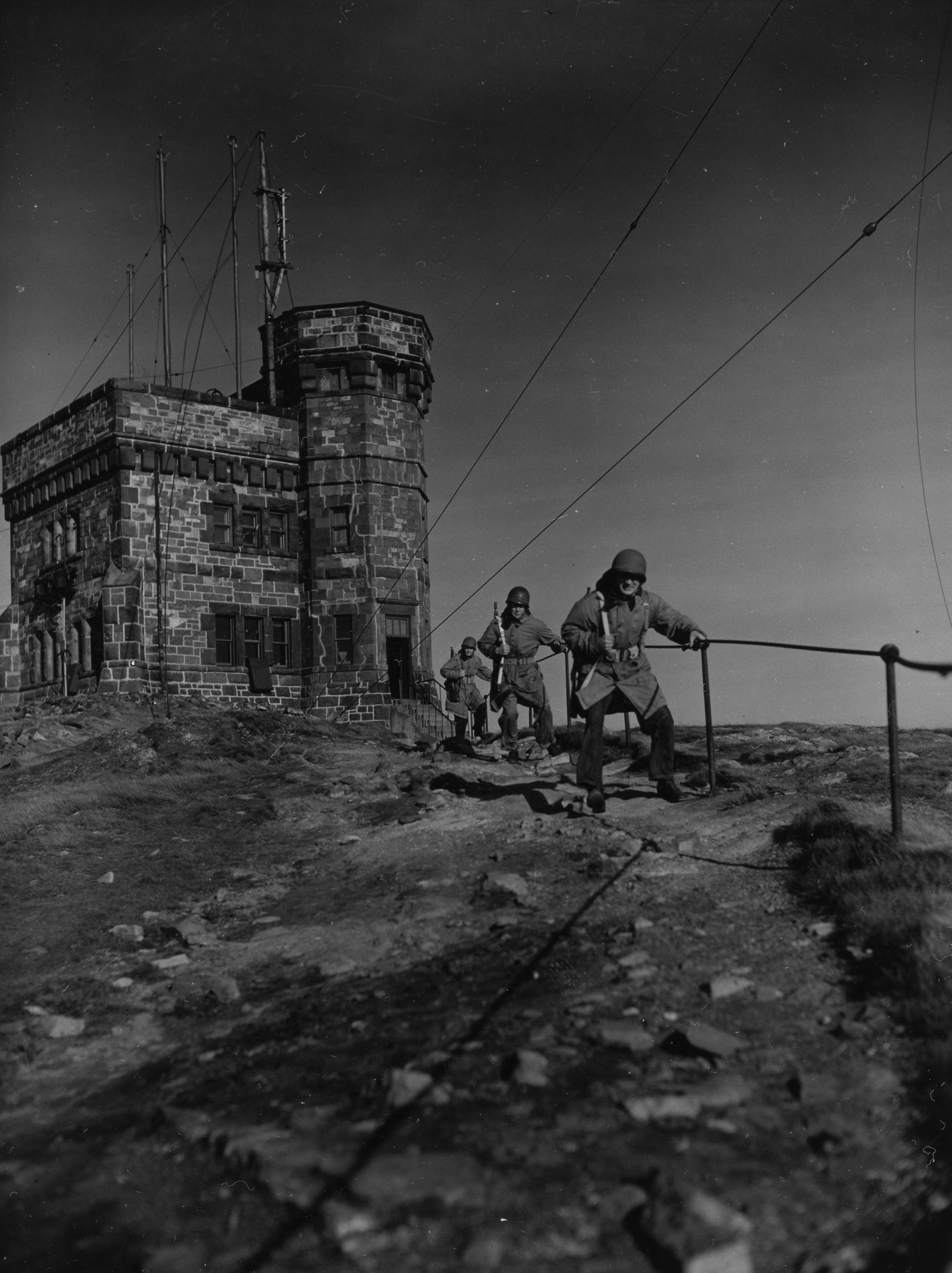
Cabot Tower in 1943

The building was used primarily for flag signalling. The British military first used Signal Hill, originally known as the Lookout, for this purpose in around 1704. There was a mast at the highest point on the hill, and it would be the job of a signalman to keep an eye out for ships approaching the city. When one was spotted he would indicate by flag what type of ship it was, what country it was from and fire off a cannon so that the men below in the town would know to look towards the hill. Those townsfolk would then fire off a response. By the end of the 18th century, a blockhouse had been constructed on the site. By the 19th century, the signalling was done mostly for the various merchants who operated out of St. John's. Cabot Tower was the last in a line of signalling blockhouses built on Signal Hill. It was used for flag signalling until 1958.

In 1933, a Marconi station, which operated until 1960, was opened on the second floor of Cabot Tower. In 1920, one of the first wireless transatlantic transmissions of the human voice was made there. Men at the wireless station were able to talk with the steamship Victoria which was steaming out of England. Today, the Society of Newfoundland Radio Amateurs operates a ham radio there.

== Architectural value ==
Located at the highest point of Signal Hill, overlooking the city and the ocean, Cabot Tower is an example of late-Gothic Revival style. Built of irregularly coursed red sandstone, it is composed of a two-story, 30 foot, square structure with a three-story, 50 foot octagonal tower that stands on the southeast corner of the building. The corners are buttressed at the first floor level and further emphasized through the use of heavier blocks of stone. On the main body of the building, at the top of the second storey level, is a line of repeating pattern like an exaggerated dentil row or inverted crenelations. The attached tower, which houses the main entrance, is very plain with a double string course marking the divisions between second and third storeys and heavy corbel tables marking the eight corners of the turret at the flared upper level. The windows on both the corner turret and the body of the tower proper are rectangular and set under heavy stone lintels.

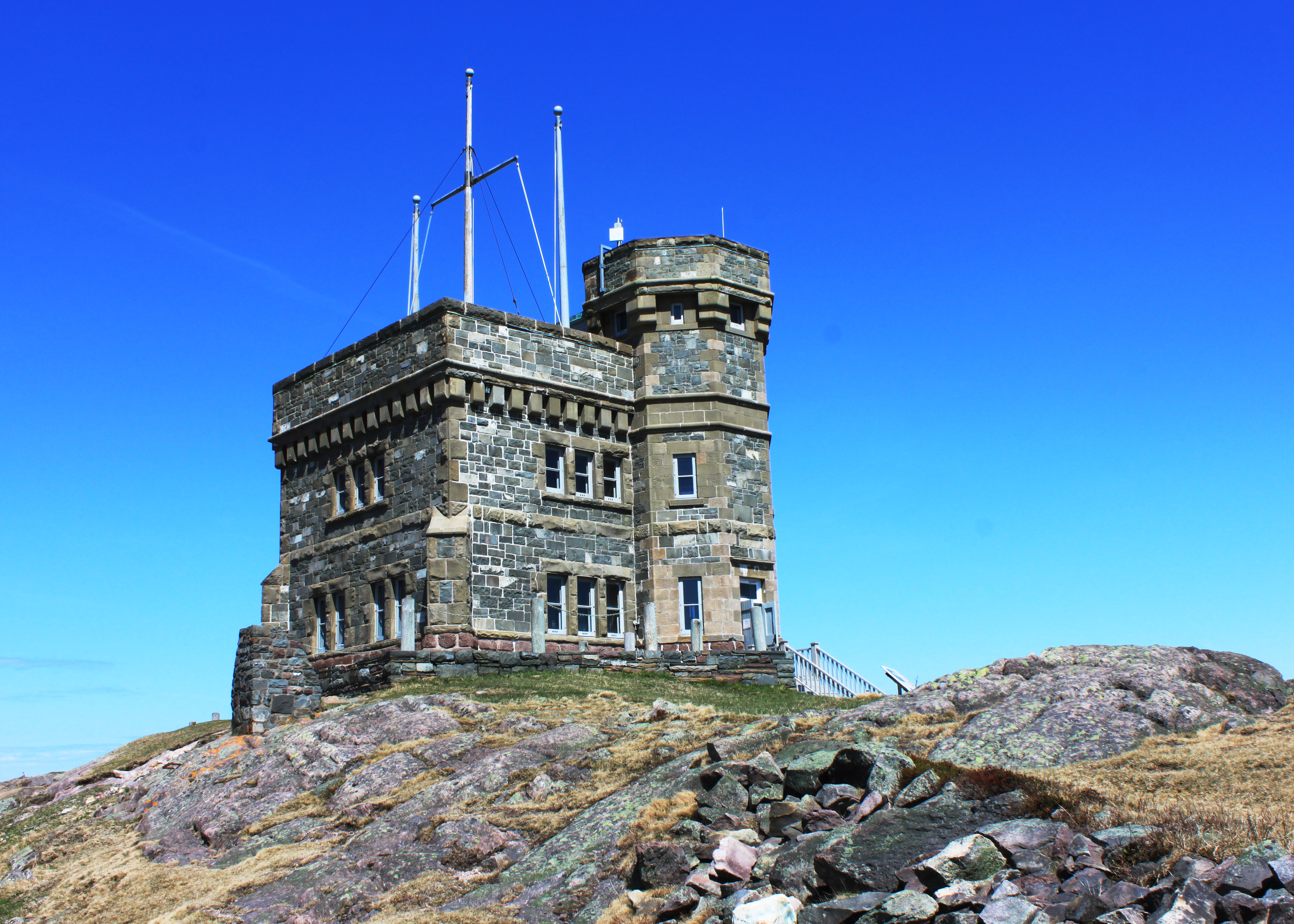
View from south

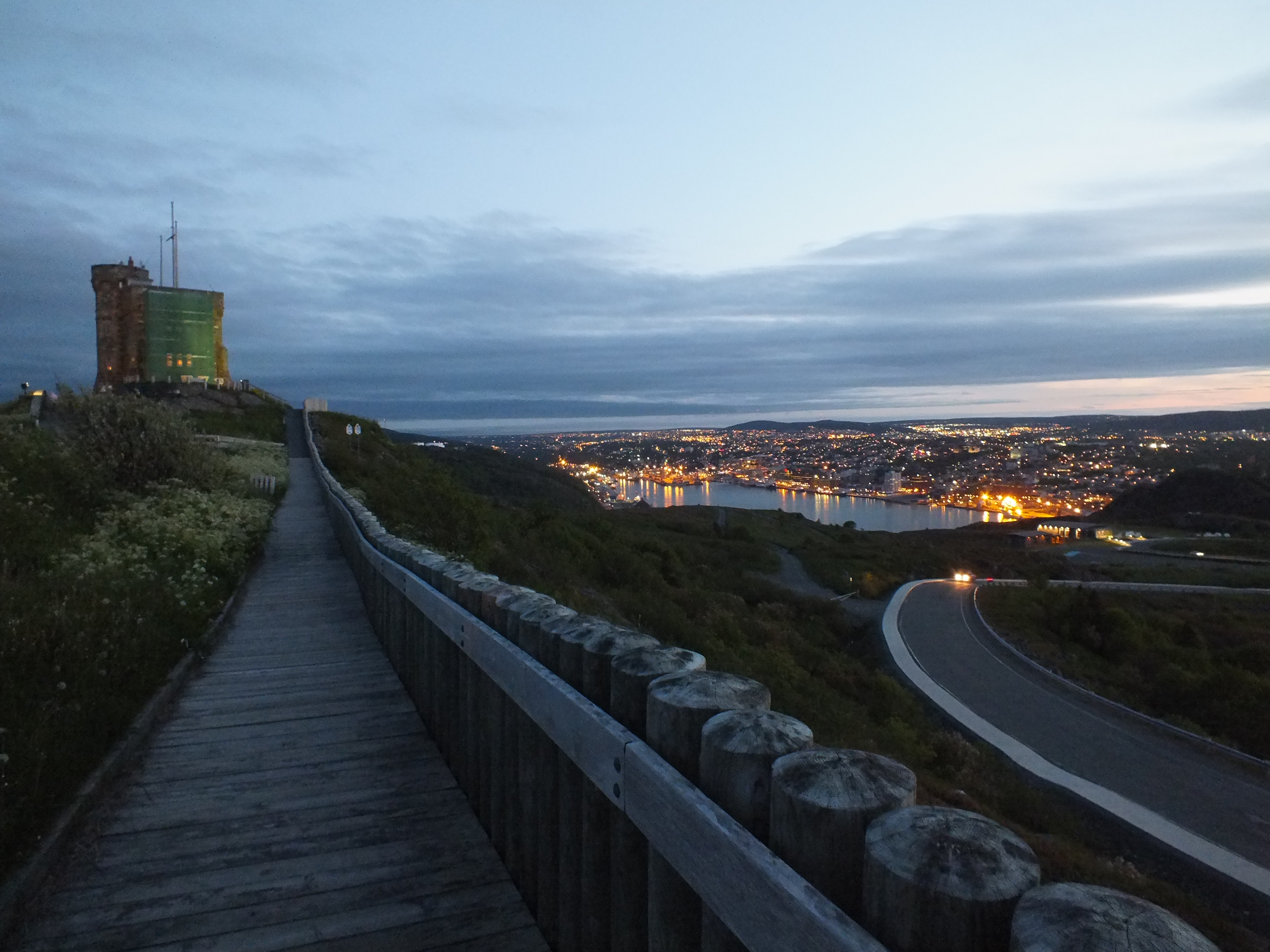

The architect of Cabot Tower, William Howe Greene, was a prominent St. John's architect and an associate of the Royal Institute of British Architects.

== Explosion ==
On December 31, 1918, there was an explosion at Cabot Tower. Mr. Michael Cantwell was preparing the gunpowder for the noonday gun when it exploded. It is believed to have been caused by his pipe. The structure suffered damage to the south corner and was later repaired.

== See also ==
- Dingle Tower, Nova Scotia – bronze plaque to John Cabot
- Cabot Tower, Bristol
