= Mundy Pond (Newfoundland) =

Pond in Newfoundland and Labrador

- Location within Newfoundland and Labrador
- Location: St. John's, Newfoundland and Labrador, Canada
- Coordinates: 47°33′05″N 52°44′21″W

Mundy Pond is a pond in St. John's, Newfoundland and Labrador, Canada that runs along Mundy Pond Road. It has facilities such as a park and skatepark near its shore, with a trail around its shore.
