= List of National Historic Sites of Canada in Newfoundland and Labrador =

This is a list of National Historic Sites (French: Lieux historiques nationaux) in the province of Newfoundland and Labrador. As of 2026, there are 48 National Historic Sites designated in Newfoundland and Labrador, 10 of which are administered by Parks Canada (identified below by the beaver icon). Most National Historic Sites not administered by Parks Canada are the property of municipal governments, religious congregations, community groups, individuals or companies and may not be open to the public. National Historic Sites not administered by Parks Canada are not included in Parks Canada entry passes.

The first National Historic Sites to be designated in the province were Fort Amherst, Fort Townshend and Signal Hill in 1951.

The Beaumont-Hamel Newfoundland Memorial, a National Historic Site commemorating Dominion of Newfoundland forces killed during World War I, is located in France.

Numerous National Historic Events also occurred across Newfoundland & Labrador, and are identified at places associated with them, using the same style of federal plaque which marks National Historic Sites. Several National Historic Persons are commemorated throughout the province in the same way. The markers do not indicate which designation—a Site, Event, or Person—a subject has been given.

This list uses names designated by the national Historic Sites and Monuments Board, which may differ from other names for these sites.

* UNESCO World Heritage Site

== National Historic Sites ==
Site	Date(s)	Designated	Location	Description	Image
Basilica of St. John the Baptist	1855 (completed)	1983	St. John's; 47°34′2″N 52°42′36″W	Stone cathedral, constructed in the Lombard Romanesque Revival style, which has played an important role in the province's religious, political and social history	Front of Basilica
Battle Harbour Historic District	1770s (established)	1996	Battle Harbour; 52°16′0″N 55°35′13″W	A noted example of a traditional outport fishing community; the buildings, structures and open spaces evoke the fishing outports of the 19th and early 20th-century	Battle Harbour Historic District in the fog
Boyd's Cove Beothuk	3000 BP (c.) (human occupation)	1995	Boyd's Cove; 49°27′26″N 54°38′12″W	A major archaeological site which has substantially increased the knowledge of the early history and demise of the Beothuk people	A grassy area with markers showing locations of archeologically important areas
Cable Building	1913 (completed)	2008	Bay Roberts; 47°35′47″N 53°15′16″W	Newfoundland was a major telecommunications hub at the beginning of the 20th century as it offered the shortest link between North America and Europe; the building was the main relay for the transatlantic network of the Western Union Telegraph Company	Cable Building
Cape Pine Lighthouse	1851 (completed)	1974	Cape Pine; 46°37′2″N 53°31′56″W	First of a series of prefabricated iron lighthouses erected in Newfoundland in the 19th century, for transport to and erection at rugged sites; the first landfall light built on the dangerous south coast of the Avalon Peninsula to guide shipping through the Cabot Strait	Cape Pine Lighthouse
Cape Race Lighthouse	1907 (completed)	1975	Cape Race; 46°39′31″N 53°4′25″W	At the time of this lighthouse's construction, it was the most important light on the dangerous southern shore of the Avalon Peninsula and it housed one of the most powerful lighting apparatuses in the world	Cape Race lighthouse
Cape Spear Lighthouse	1835 (completed)	1962	Cape Spear; 47°31′20″N 52°37′36″W	The oldest surviving lighthouse in Newfoundland, constructed on the easternmost point in North America; built in 1835 by the Colony of Newfoundland to signal the approach to St. John's harbour	Cape Spear lighthouse
Castle Hill	1692 (established)	1968	Placentia; 47°15′3.88″N 53°58′17.31″W	The remains of French and British fortifications overlooking the town; the defences played an important role in both local defence and the larger military interests of France and Britain in Atlantic Canada	Placentia from Castle Hill
Christ Church / Quidi Vidi Church	1842 (completed)	1966	St. John's; 47.582791°N 52.678558°W	A modest, wood church, located on a steep hill overlooking the harbour of the former village of Quidi Vidi; representative of the rapidly disappearing architecture of 19th-century outports	Worn exterior of Christ Church / Quidi Vidi Church
Colony of Avalon	1621 (established)	1953	Ferryland; 47°1′22″N 52°52′49″W	Serving as an important fishing and commercial station in the 17th century, it was abandoned after its burning and expulsion of its inhabitants by the French in 1696; despite so, it is the best preserved early English settlement in Canada	Ruins of a mansion in Ferryland
Crow's Nest Officers' Club	1942 (established)	2011	St. John's; 47°34′4″N 52°42′12″W	Opened as a seagoing officer's club during the Second World War, the club served men from Allied navies and allowed the men from each vessel to decorate a section of wall as a memento to their ship; the club, along with its military memorabilia and artwork, remains a memorial to the naval war efforts	The stairs leading up to the Crow's Nest Officer's Club
Fleur de Lys Soapstone Quarries	400 CE (c.)	1982	Fleur de Lys; 47°1′22″N 52°52′49″W	Soapstone was an important raw material for many aboriginal societies in Newfoundland, primarily used here for bowls and oil lamps; this archaeological site preserves considerable evidence about resource extraction techniques in Dorset culture	
Former Bank of British North America	1850 (completed)	1990	St. John's; 47°33′56.76″N 52°42′24.17″W	A three-and-a-half-storey brick building with mansard roof and Italianate features which housed many of Newfoundland's major banks from 1849 to 1985; closely associated with the evolution of banking in Newfoundland	Exterior view of front facade of the Former Bank of British North America building
Former Carbonear Railway Station (Newfoundland Railway)	1918 (completed)	1988	Carbonear; 47°44′15″N 53°13′47″W	A one-storey, wood-frame building with a hip roof and overhanging eaves; representative of the stations on the Newfoundland Railway and typical architecture of early-20th-century, rural railway stations across Canada	
Former Newfoundland Railway Headquarters	1903	1988	St. John's; 47°33′16.21″N 52°42′49.13″W	A two-and-a-half-storey stone building with both Second Empire and Château design elements; commemorates the important role played by the Newfoundland Railway in the social, economic and political history of the province	Newfoundland Railway Station, St. John's
Fort Amherst	1777 (established)	1951	St. John's; 47°33′49″N 52°40′50″W	The site of British fortification built to guard the mouth of St. John's harbour, of which there are no visible remains; named after William Amherst who recaptured St. John's from the French in 1762	View from Signal Hill
Fort Townshend	1773 (established)	1951	St. John's; 47°33′58″N 52°42′44″W	An archaeological site at the former location of a British fort that served as the headquarters of the Newfoundland garrison from 1779 until 1871; the site is now occupied by The Rooms	Plaque commemorating the site of Fort Townshend
Fort William	1697 (established)	1952	St. John's; 47°34′15″N 52°42′2″W	The site of a fort which served as the original headquarters of the British garrison in Newfoundland, and which was attacked three times by the French; the fort represented the first official military presence in St. John's, although it was supplanted by Fort Townshend in the 1770s, and demolished in 1881	
Government House	1831 (completed)	1982	St. John's; 47°33′49″N 52°40′50″W	A Palladian-style mansion originally built for Thomas Cochrane, the first civil governor of the Newfoundland Colony; its construction marked the transition of the colony from a naval to civilian government, and the house has served as the official residence of Newfoundland's governors and lieutenant governors ever since	Government House, St. John's, Newfoundland
Harbour Grace Court House	1830 (completed)	1966	Harbour Grace; 47°41′44″N 53°12′45″W	A two-storey stone building characterized by a split staircase on the front facade; the oldest surviving public building in the province	
Hawthorne Cottage	1830 (completed)	1978	Brigus; 47°32′6.54″N 53°12′35.53″W	A Picturesque cottage with a wrap-around verandah and a home of Arctic-explorer Robert Bartlett	Two Muskoka chairs and a Canada flag overlooking Hawthorne Cottage
Hebron Mission	1829 (established)	1976	Hebron; 58°11′58″N 62°37′33″W	A complex of linked buildings, including a church, mission house, and store, all in a Germanic-influenced architectural style; a Moravian centre of religious instruction to the local Inuit, which also served commercial and medical purposes	The mission at Hebron, Labrador.
Hopedale Mission	1782 (established)	1970	Hopedale; 55°27′30.83″N 60°12′45.21″W	A complex of large, wooden buildings constructed by the Moravian Church; commemorates the interaction between Labrador Inuit and missionaries, and representative of Moravian Mission architecture in Labrador	
Indian Point		1978	Beothuk Lake; 48°47′44″N 56°34′38″W	A well documented Beothuk site, it is a camp where they wintered in well-built, multi-sided mamateeks and hunted the native caribou; occupied for many generations, it was abandoned sometime around 1820	
Kameshtashtan	7300 BCE to present	2022	Mistastin crater 55.883333°N 63.300000°W	A cultural landscape of profound meaning to the Mushuau Innu of northern Labrador, includes a lake, islands, the lake shore and the surrounding plateau landscape.	
Kitjigattalik - Ramah Chert Quarries	3000 BCE to 1400 AD	2015	Torngat Mountains National Park; 58.976564°N 63.185867°W	Quarry of unique chert widely traded in eastern America, active from 5,000 to 600 years ago; has been linked to Late Archaic burial complexes and belief systems; was also the basis of long-distance exchange between eastern Canada and New England	
L'Anse Amour	6100 BCE (c.)	1978	L'Anse Amour; 51°28′49″N 56°51′59″W	One of the largest and longest used Aboriginal habitation sites in Labrador; earliest known funeral monument in the New World	
L'Anse aux Meadows *	1000 CE (c.)	1968	St. Anthony; 51°35′43″N 55°31′59.47″W	The first known settlement established by Vikings in North America, containing the earliest evidence of Europeans in Canada; a World Heritage Site	L'Anse aux Meadows
Mallard Cottage	1820 (c.) (completed)	1983	St. John's; 47°34′54″N 52°40′42″W	A wood-frame house with hip roof and central chimney, typical of the vernacular housing built by Irish immigrants in the first half of the 19th century	Exterior of Mallard Cottage
Murray Premises	1849 (completed)	1976	St. John's; 47.561401°N 52.709531°W	A complex of three former warehouses; commemorative of the offices and warehouses which once lined St. John's harbour and of the city's long tradition of sea-based trade	Courtyard of Murray Premises
Newfoundland National War Memorial	1924	August 21, 2019	St. John's; 47.567660°N 52.703769°W	Imposing, heroic memorial to Newfoundland's sacrifice during the World War I and subsequent conflicts; location of where Sir Humphrey Gilbert claimed Newfoundland for England in 1583	Newfoundland National War Memorial
Okak	5550 BCE (c.) (first human occupation)	1978	Okak; 51°35′43″N 55°31′59.47″W	Sixty archaeological sites, dating from 5550 BCE onwards, representative of habitation from Maritime Archaic to Labrador Inuit; location of the second oldest Moravian mission in Labrador, founded in 1776 and abandoned in 1919	
Port au Choix		1970	Port au Choix; 50°42′14.54″N 57°23′24.01″W	Two exceptional rare and rich pre-contact archaeological sites, one a Maritime Archaic cemetery and the other a Paleo-Eskimo habitation site	Port au Choix
Port Union Historic District	1916 (established)	1999	Trinity Bay North; 48°29′51″N 53°4′56″W	The only town in Canada founded by a union; built by the Fishermen's Protective Union along an empty stretch of shoreline, the town was noted for its commercial success in the face of fierce competition from commercial merchants	
Red Bay *	1550 (whaling port established) (c.)	1979	Red Bay; 51°43′31.34″N 56°25′59.39″W	A World Heritage Site and the site of one of the largest whaling ports used between 1550 and 1620 by Basque whaling expeditions from France and Spain; well-preserved evidence of the 16th-century whaling activities remain on the site, both on land and submerged in the harbour	Basque whaling station on Saddle Island. The location of the sunken vessel San Juan (1565) is near the Bernier's wreck that grounded in 1966
Rennie's Mill Road Historic District	1846 (established)	1987	St. John's; 47°34′16″N 52°42′34″W	Originally a suburb of large, wooden houses mainly from the late 19th to the early 20th centuries; a remarkably homogeneous grouping of upper middle class residences, associated with prominent Newfoundlanders of the period	Front facade of a row of Victorian townhomes
Ryan Premises	1857 (established)	1987	Bonavista; 48°38′52.31″N 53°6′45.7″W	A cultural landscape comprising residential and commercial structures typical of a 19th-century Newfoundland mercantile outport, still located in their original setting by the sea	Ryan Premises viewed from the water
St. John the Baptist Anglican Cathedral	1850 (completed)	1979	St. John's; 47°33′55″N 52°42′30″W	A magnificent stone cathedral designed by George Gilbert Scott for Canada's oldest Anglican parish; a nationally significant example of Gothic Revival architecture, and one that conforms to the tenets of the Cambridge Camden Society	Cathedral of St. John the Baptist
St. John's Court House	1904 (completed)	1981	St. John's; 47°33′53″N 52°42′26″W	A granite and sandstone Romanesque Revival-style courthouse; the most elaborate courthouse in the province and representative of the judicial system in Newfoundland	Exterior view of the St. John's Court House
St. John's Ecclesiastical District		2008	St. John's; 47°34′4″N 52°42′41″W	Buildings and landscape features associated with the Roman Catholic, Anglican, United (formerly Methodist) and Presbyterian denominations; representative of the involvement of Christian institutions in the history and political life of St. John's and the province	St. Bonaventure's College in the St. John's Ecclesiastical District
St. John's WWII Coastal Defences (Atlantic Bulwark)	1939 (established)	1993	St. John's; 47°33′49″N 52°40′47″W	St. John's served as the main North American base for trans-Atlantic escorts during the Second World War; Canadian and American gun batteries and Canadian air force squadrons protected St. John's harbour	The HMSC Corner Brook submarine travelling past the remains of the coastal defences
St. Patrick's Roman Catholic Church	1881 (completed), 1914 (spire)	1990	St. John's; 47°33′13″N 52°43′1″W	A noted example of Gothic Revival architecture in Canada; the design reflects the strong links between Ireland and Newfoundland, as well as the influence of Victorian design on colonial churches	St. Patrick's Church
St. Thomas Rectory / Commissariat House and Garden	1821 (completed)	1968	St. John's; 47°34′21″N 52°42′9″W	A wooden building constructed by the Corps of Royal Engineers for the British military garrison; after 1870, it served as the rectory for the Old Garrison Church	View of the wooden exterior of the former commissariat house
Signal Hill	1660 (military role established)	1951	St. John's; 47°34′10.06″N 52°40′56.19″W	A landmark promontory that frames the entrance to St. John's Harbour, identifiable by the profile of Cabot Tower; site played important roles in Canada's defence and communications histories	View of Cabot Tower atop Signal Hill
Tilting	1730 (established)	2003	Tilting; 49°42′13″N 54°3′38.27″W	An outport fishing community on Fogo Island; illustrative of the adaptation of Irish settlement patterns to Newfoundland, and a rare surviving example of mid-18th century landscape components	Sheep in Tilting
Walled Landscape of Grates Cove	1790 (established)	1995	Grates Cove; 48°10′0″N 52°56′22″W	A 60.7-hectare (150-acre) grassy landscape located on a windswept headland; small fertile gardens, demarcated by stone walls, represent a rare surviving example of a communal system of land and community organization unique to Newfoundland	Walled Landscape of Grates Cove
Water Street Historic District	1847 (commencement of reconstruction after the Great Fire)	1987	St. John's; 47°33′43.9″N 52°42′34.14″W	Twenty 19th-century mercantile buildings on Water Street near the harbour; representative of the business establishments associated with the Newfoundland fisheries and the Atlantic trade	Water Street
Winterholme	1907 (completed)	1991	St. John's; 47°34′20″N 52°42′39″W	A home originally built for local businessman Marmaduke Winter; a noted example of a conservative approach to the Queen Anne Revival style in Canadian domestic architecture	Front facade and circular driveway of large detached house

== See also ==
- History of Newfoundland and Labrador
- List of historic places in Newfoundland and Labrador
