= Red Bay National Historic Site =

Red Bay Basque Whaling Station
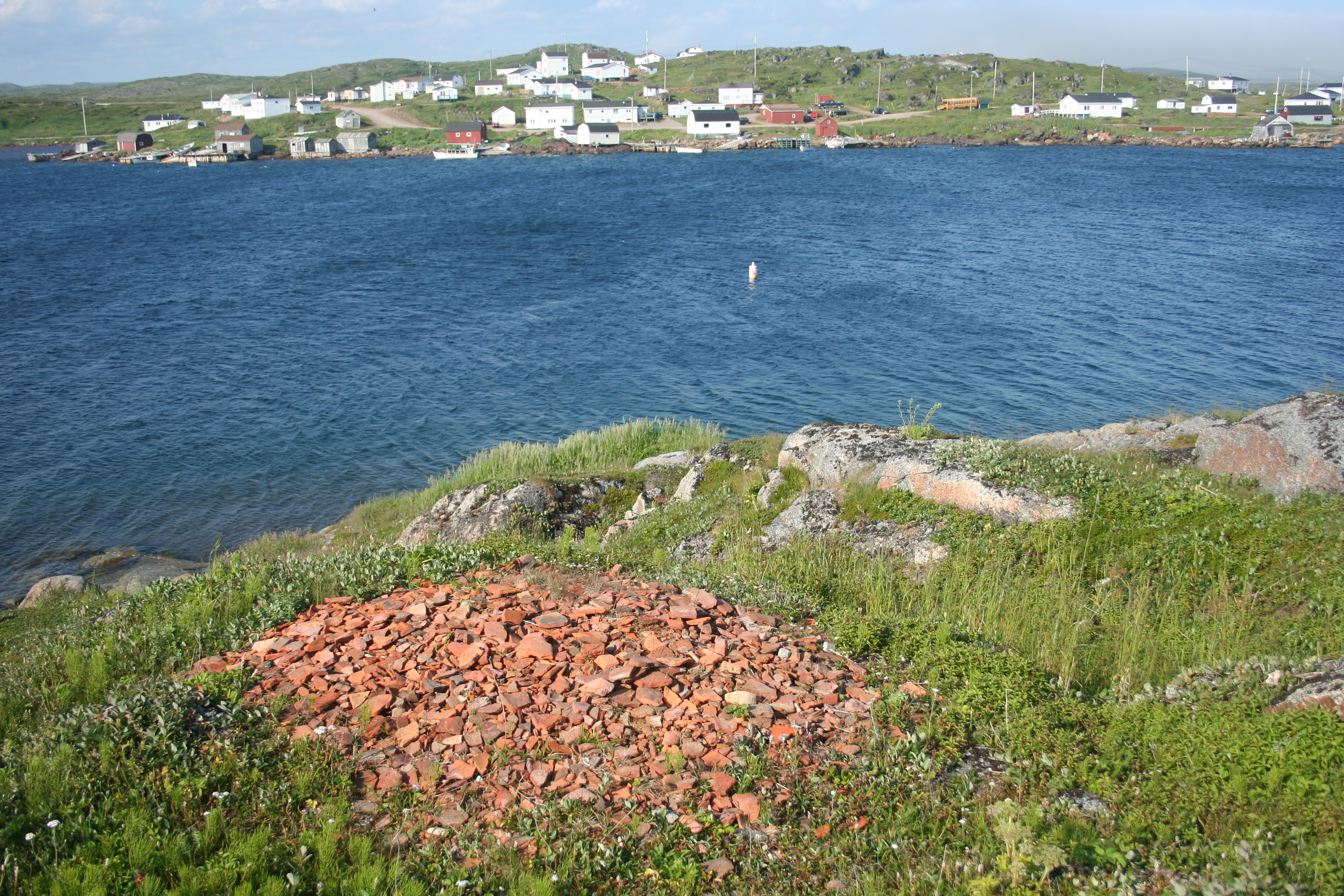
- A pile of Basque earthenware tiles on Saddle Island overlooking Red Bay

- Location within Canada Location within Newfoundland and Labrador
- 51°43′51.88″N 56°24′56.16″W
- Location: Newfoundland and Labrador, Canada

Site notes
- Area: 313 hectares (770 acres; 3.13 km^{2})
- Website: parks.canada.ca/lhn-nhs/nl/redbay

UNESCO World Heritage Site
- Official name: Red Bay National Historic Site
- Type: Cultural
- Criteria: iii, iv
- Designated: 2013 (37th session)
- Reference no.
- Country: Canada
- Region: Europe and North America

National Historic Site of Canada
- Official name: Red Bay National Historic Site of Canada
- Designated: 21 May 1979

The Red Bay National Historic Site is a National Historic Site of Canada located in Red Bay, Newfoundland and Labrador. This on-land and underwater archaeological site marks one of the best preserved Basque whaling station locations of the 16th century and covers 600 hectares. In 1979, Red Bay was declared a National Historic Site and in 2013, it was designated as a UNESCO World Heritage site.

== Geography ==
Red Bay is located approximately 530 km as the crow flies from St. John's. It is located north of the strait of Belle Isle, which separates the island of Newfoundland and the continental portion, Labrador. Red Bay is accessible by Route 510 and situated 80 km from Blanc-Sablon.

Red Bay, strictly speaking, is protected from the Atlantic Ocean by Saddle Island, making it the ideal natural harbour.

== Basque mariners ==
Red Bay, established by Basque mariners in the 16th century at the north-eastern tip of Canada on the shore of the Strait of Belle Isle is an archaeological site that provides the earliest, most complete and best preserved testimony of the European whaling tradition. Gran Baya, as it was called by those who founded the station in 1530s, was used as a base for coastal hunting, butchering, rendering of whale fat by heading to produce oil and storage. It became a major source of whale oil which was shipped to Europe where it was used for lighting. The site, which was used in the summer months, includes remains of rendering ovens, cooperages, wharves, temporary living quarters and a cemetery, together with underwater remains of vessels and whale bone deposits. The station was used by the Basques for some 70 years, from 1550 to 1625, before the local whale population was depleted.

Basque whaling activity in Canadian waters was drawn to the attention of historians and archaeologists by the archival work of Selma Barkham, which she began in 1972. Prior to this, the 16th-century exploitation of Canada's Atlantic coast had been almost totally omitted from any history of the country. The archaeological investigations of Red Bay and adjacent sites were carried out as a result of her work.

== Archaeology ==
In 1977, an initial shore-based survey was made of some of harbours on the northern shore of the Strait of Belle Isle. Archaeologists found compelling evidence of Basque whaling expeditions in Red Bay, including many whale bones on the beaches, large numbers of clay roofing tiles (the remains of buildings put up by the whalers), and burnt animal fat associated with stone foundations. The entire hull structure, artefacts and other finds were mapped in situ, excavated and then archaeologically recorded in detail on land. The hull components were disassembled, as necessary, to carry out this process, From the outset of the project, it had been clear that the funds were not available to carry out the large conservation effort needed to keep the structural components of the wreck on land. Therefore, they were returned to the water, being stored in a carefully designed environment which replicates the anaerobic conditions in which the wreck had remained preserved prior to excavation. A reburial process of this scale had not been previously attempted. This was carried out in 1985, the last year of the 24M fieldwork. The reburial site is regularly monitored to confirm the effectiveness of the continued preservation of the wreck timbers.

Underwater archaeological work started in 1978 and on the third day of diving, the wreck site numbered 24M was located north of Cox Hill on Saddle Island. It is about 30 metres (98 ft) from the shoreline. The centreline of the hull was aligned roughly north-south with the bow furthest from the beach. The site slopes; the stern was in 7 metres (23 ft) of water and the bow in about 12 m. It is likely that the ship dragged her anchor in a north-westerly storm at the end of the whaling season when she was loaded with barrels of whale oil and nearly ready to make the transatlantic passage back to her home port. The 24M site was ultimately concluded to most likely be the wreck of San Juan.

== Gallery ==
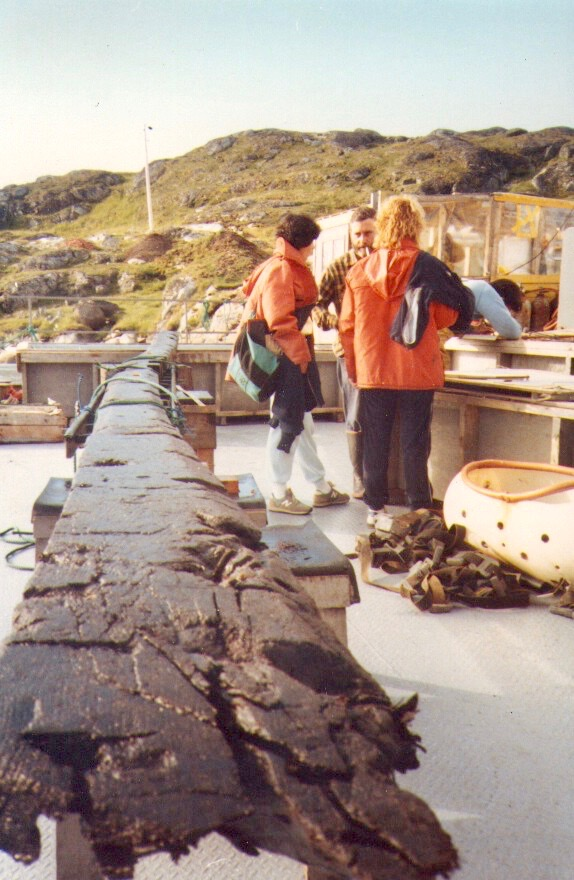
Pieces of a whale ship

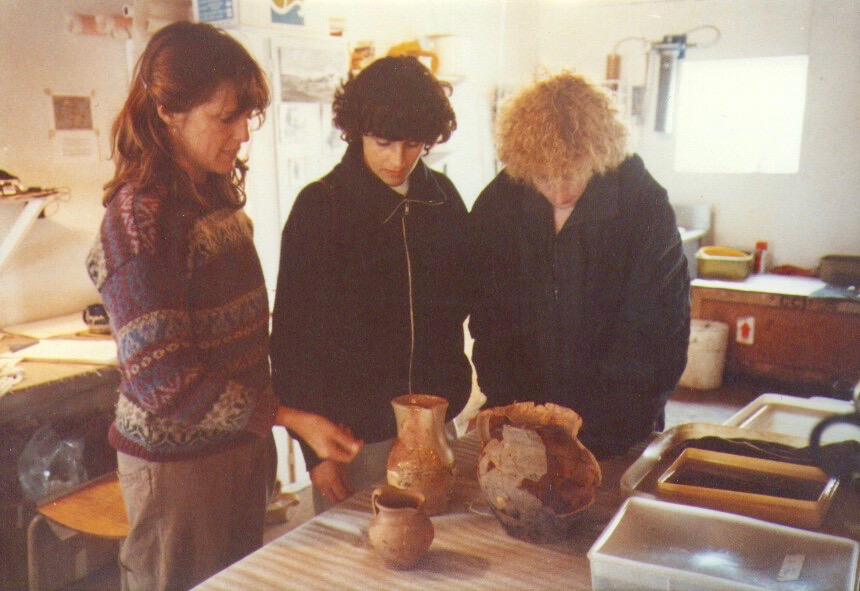
Pitchers found in a shipwreck

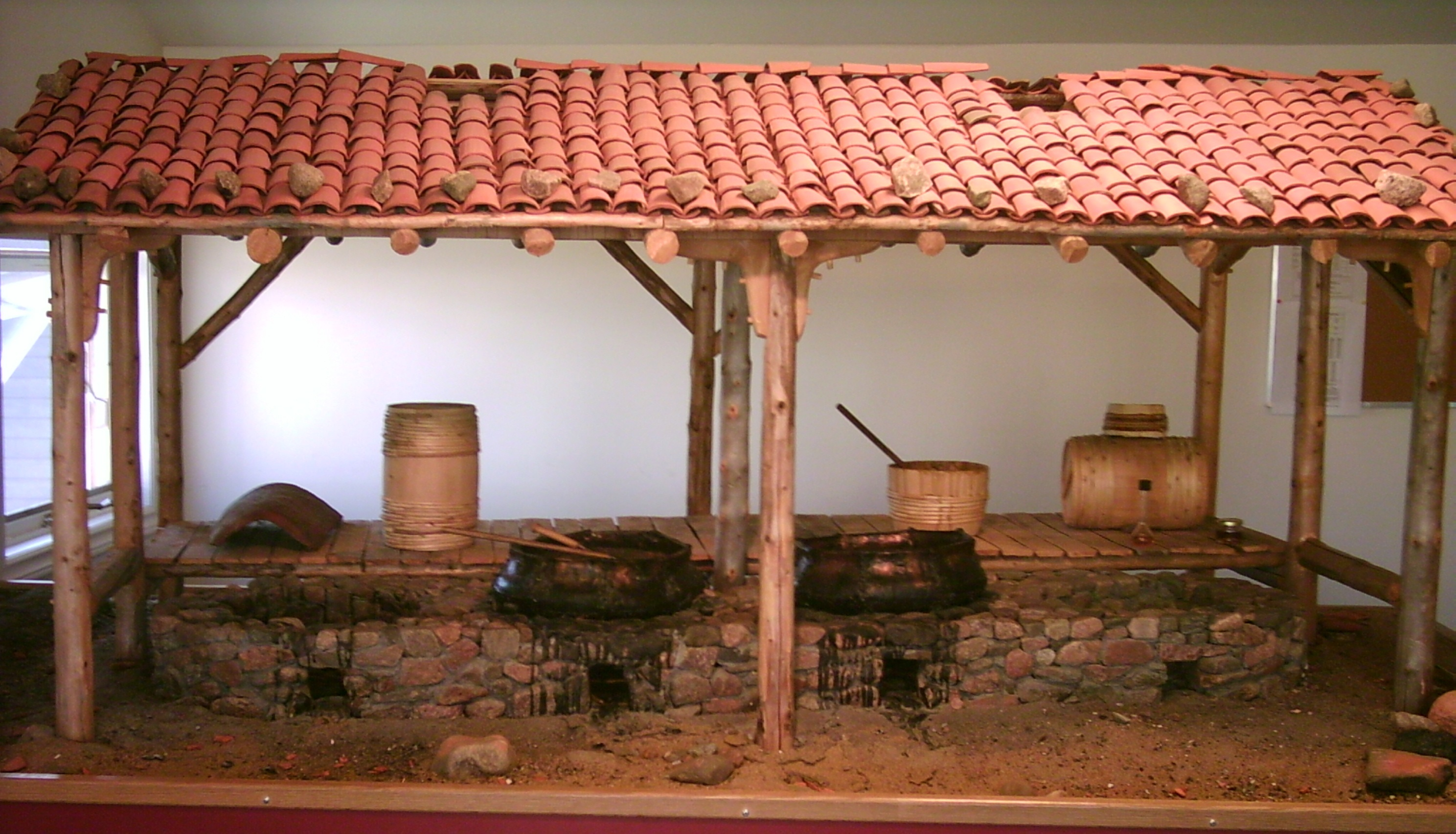
A reconstruction of the tryworks used for producing whale oil, including the distinctive clay tiles found on the site

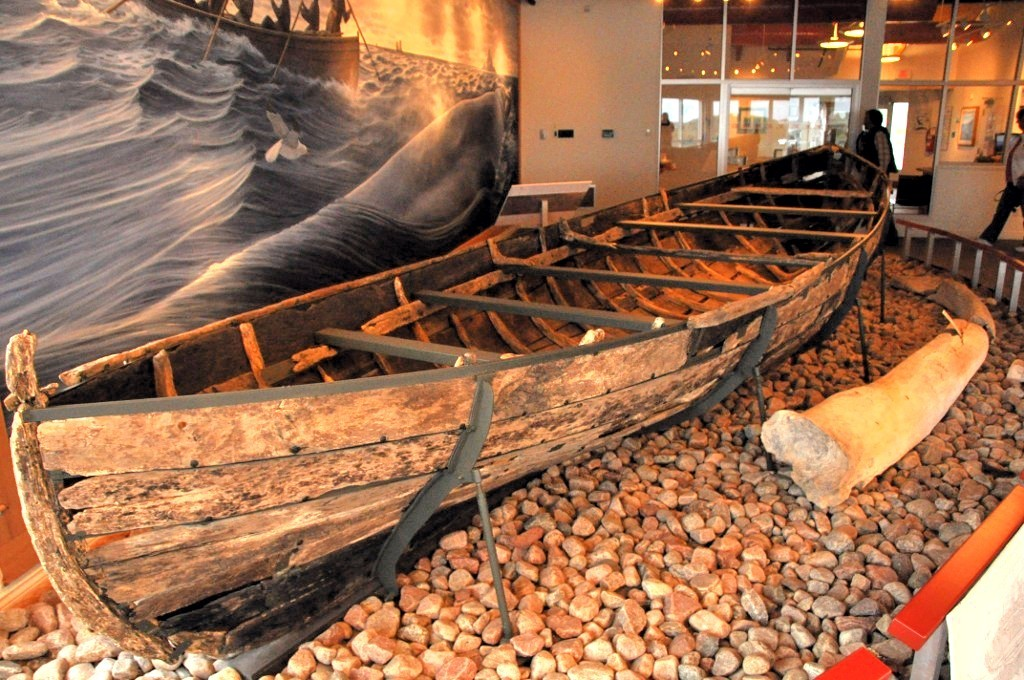
A Basque chalupa recovered from the waters of the bay and on display in the museum.

== See also ==
- List of National Historic Sites of Canada in Newfoundland and Labrador
- List of World Heritage Sites in Canada
