= Red Bay, Newfoundland and Labrador =

Red Bay
- Town
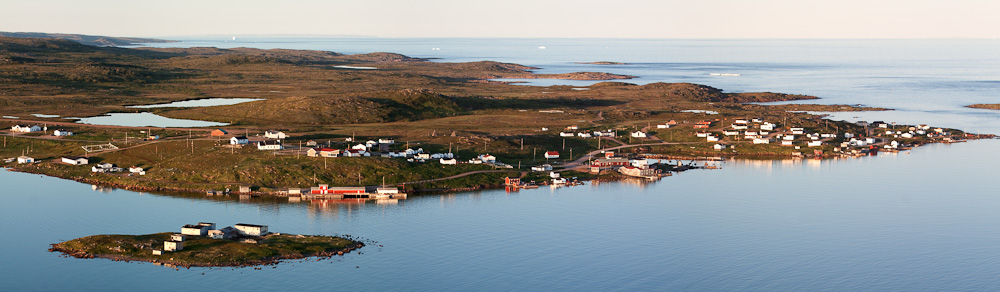
- Red Bay seen from above

- Location of Red Bay in Newfoundland and Labrador Red Bay (Newfoundland)
- Coordinates: 51°43′55″N 56°25′32″W
- Country: Canada
- Province: Newfoundland and Labrador
- Region: NunatuKavut (unofficial)

Government
  - Type: Municipal incorporation

Area
  - Total: 1.58 km^{2} (0.61 sq mi)
- Elevation: 10 m (33 ft)

Population (2021)
  - Total: 142
  - Density: 89.9/km^{2} (233/sq mi)
- Time zone: UTC-3:30 (Newfoundland Time)
  - Summer (DST): UTC-2:30 (Newfoundland Daylight)
- Area code: 709
- Highways: Route 510 (Trans-Labrador Highway)

Red Bay is a fishing village in Labrador, notable as a significant underwater archaeological site in the Americas. Between 1530 and the early 17th century, it was a major Basque whaling area. Several whaling ships, both large galleons and small chalupas, sank there, and their discovery led to the designation of Red Bay as a National Historic Site in 1979 and in 2013 as a UNESCO World Heritage Site.

== Etymology ==
The name "Red Bay" originates from the name given to the bay given by French fishermen in the 17th century, being Baie Rouge. The Basque people named the location Butus or Buitures ("Vultures"). (Note: Differing consensus on naming between sources.)

== Geography ==
Red Bay is a natural harbour residing in the bay that gives it its name, both names in reference to the red granite cliffs of the region. Because of the sheltered harbour it was used during World War II as a mooring site for naval vessels. In the bay are Penney Island and Saddle Island, which were used by the Basques for their whaling operations. The location of the sunken vessel San Juan is near Saddle Island.

== History ==
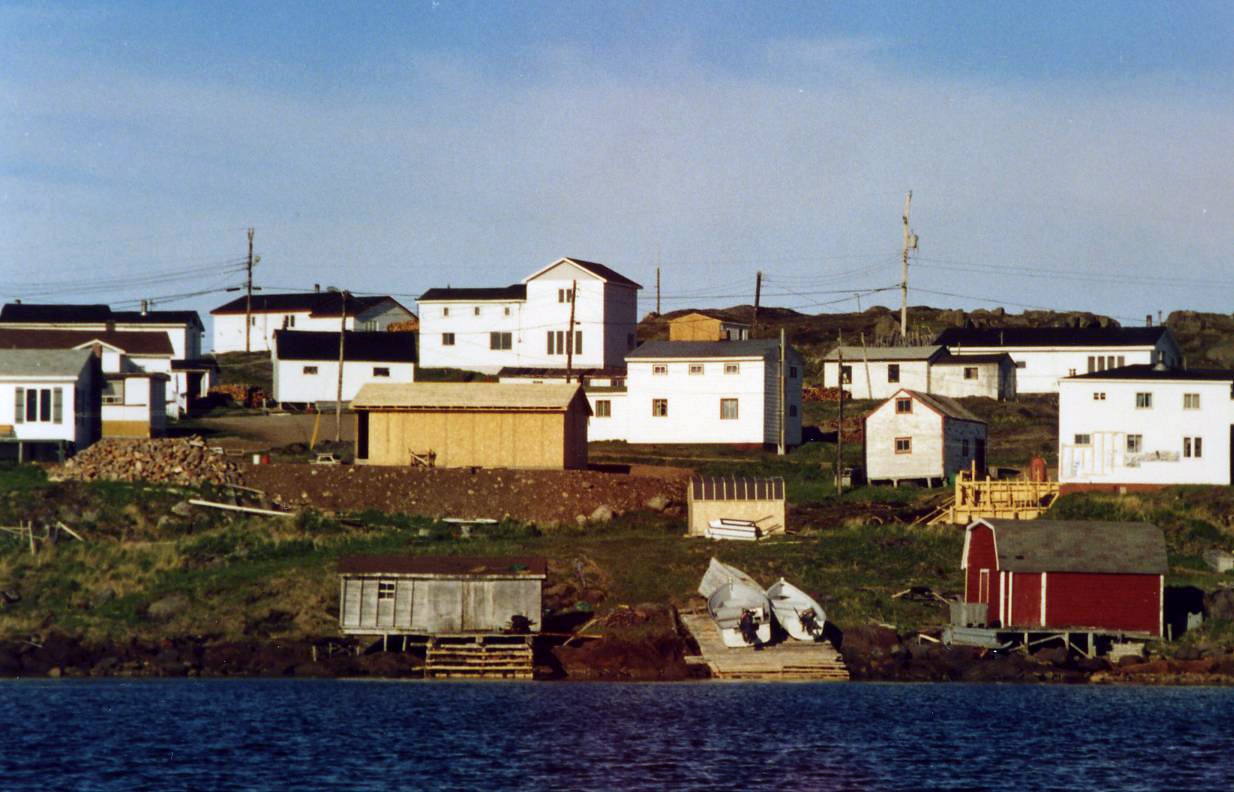

The coast of Labrador has been settled for about 9,000 years. The Maritime Archaic peoples and the Paleo-Inuit hunted seals and walrus and fished for salmon. Between 1550 and the early 17th century, Red Bay, known as Balea Baya (Whale Bay), was a centre for Basque whaling operations. Sailors from southern France and northern Spain sent 15 whaleships and 600 men a season to the remote outpost on the Strait of Belle Isle to catch the right whale and bowhead whales that populated the waters there, according to Memorial University of Newfoundland.

In 1565, San Juan, sank on a whaling expedition to Labrador. Research by Selma Barkham in Spanish archives suggested that the San Juan had been lost in Red Bay and La Madalena had sunk in Chateau Bay in the same year. By 1974, Barkham was in contact with archaeologists working for Parks Canada.

A cemetery on nearby Saddle Island holds the remains of 140 whalers. Many of the people buried there are thought to have died from drowning and exposure.

Local legends of Red Bay make reference to a hidden treasure buried in a body of water known as Pond on the Hill 51°43′43″N 56°26′56″W at the foot of Tracey Hill by the infamous pirate Captain William Kidd. An attempt was made to find the treasure by residents of Carrol Cove by draining the pond. The attempt failed.

Red Bay has been designated a National Historic Site of Canada since 1979, and since 2013 it is one of Canada's UNESCO World Heritage Sites.

In 2016, the Google Street View imaging service uploaded images of Red Bay. Red Bay is one of the few communities in Labrador with images on the service.

In 2021, the local school, Basque Memorial School closed due to no enrollment.

== Demographics ==
In the 2021 Census of Population conducted by Statistics Canada, Red Bay had a population of 142 living in 65 of its 69 total private dwellings, a change of −16% from its 2016 population of 169. With a land area of 2.31 km^{2} (0.89 sq mi), it had a population density of 61.5/km^{2} (159.2/sq mi) in 2021.

== Tourist attractions ==
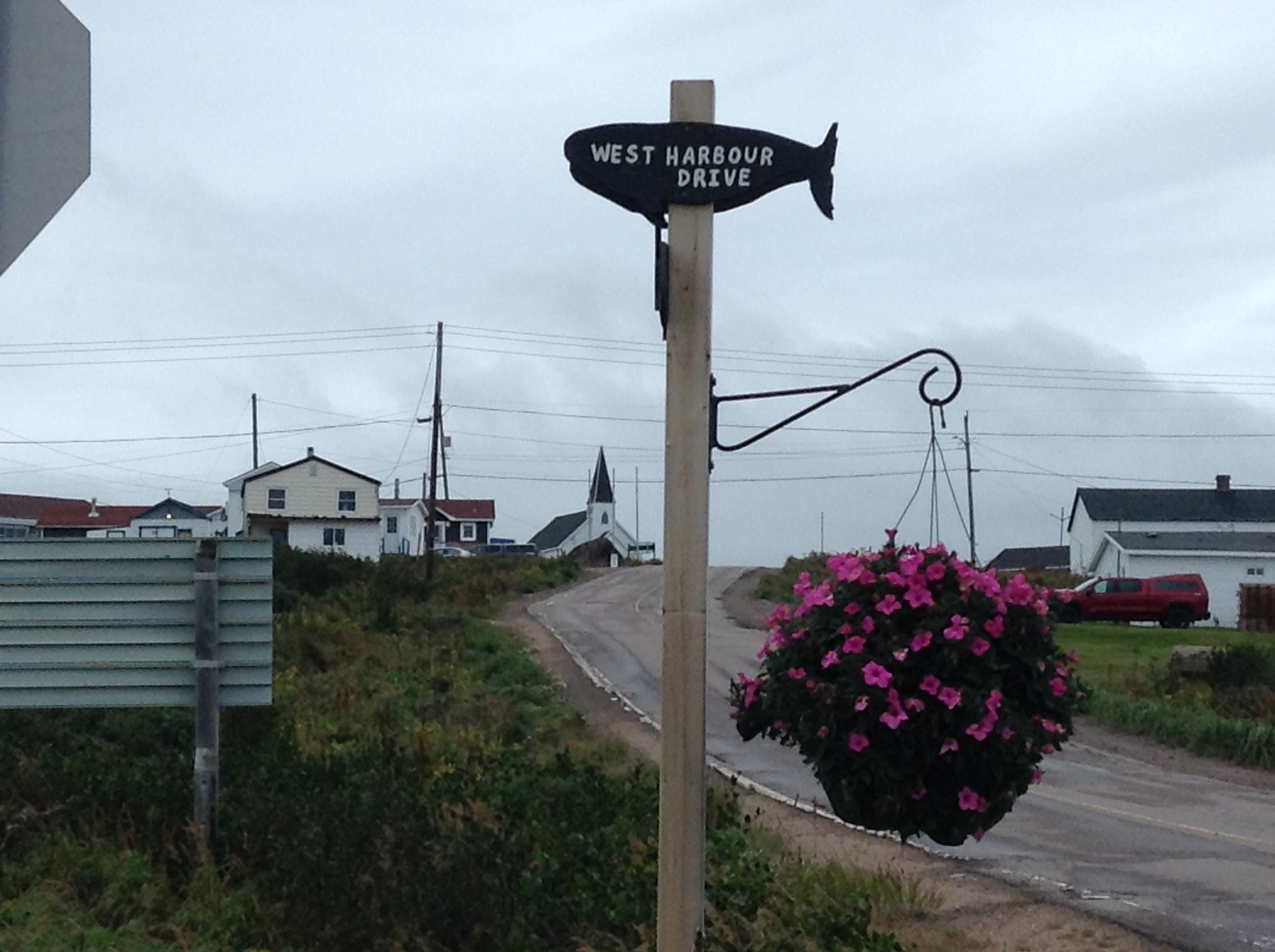
Red Bay Labrador West Harbour Drive

- Basque whaling stations
- Iceberg and whale watching
- Hiking
- Local entertainment and cuisine
- Fishing
- The Whaler's Restaurant (fish & chips and related cuisine)

== See also ==
- List of cities and towns in Newfoundland and Labrador
