= Selma Barkham =

Canadian historian and geographer (1927–2020)

Selma Barkham OC
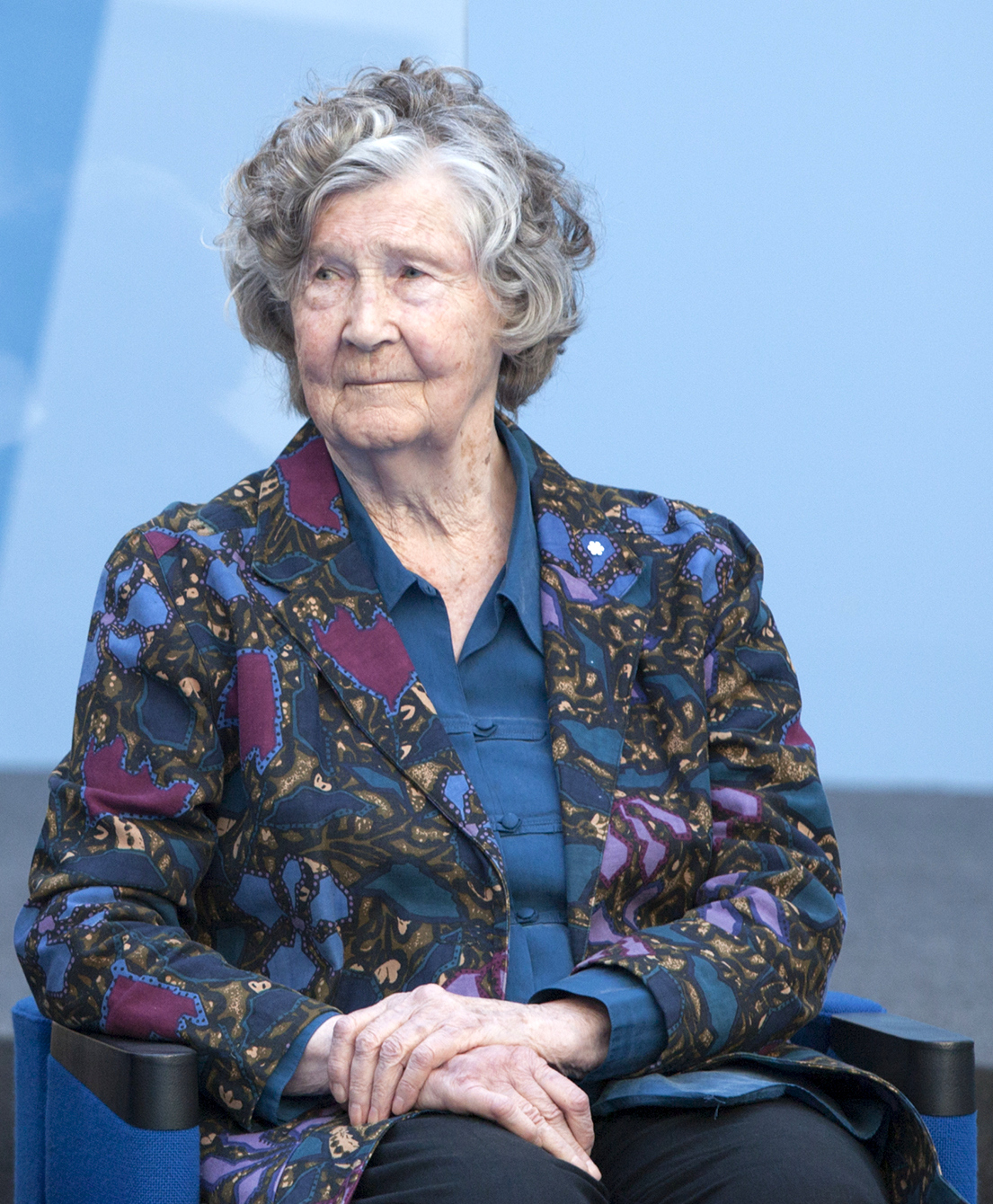
- Huxley in 2014
- Born: Selma de Lotbinière Huxley; 8 March 1927; Woolwich, London, England
- Died: 3 May 2020 (aged 93)
- Occupations: Historian, geographer
- Spouse: Brian Barkham (m. 1954)
- Family: Aldous Huxley, Julian Huxley

Selma de Lotbinière Barkham, OC, ONL (née Huxley; 8 March 1927 – 3 May 2020), was a British-Canadian historian and geographer of international standing in the fields of the maritime history of Canada and of the Basque Country.

In 1972, as an independent researcher, she moved to the Basque Country to do archival research on an aspect of Canadian and Basque history about which very little was known: Basque fisheries in the old Terra Nova, today some 2,000 kilometres of the Atlantic coast of Canada, in the 16th and 17th centuries.

The research she carried out during the following years, mostly in Basque, Spanish and Portuguese archives, allowed her to make important archival, historical and archaeological discoveries. She found thousands of documents with which she was able to reconstruct most elements of a largely unknown chapter of the history of Canada and of the Basque Country: the Basque cod and whale fisheries in Terra Nova especially in the 16th century. She discovered the existence of a 16th-century Basque whaling industry in southern Labrador and adjacent Quebec, their whaling ports, archaeological remains of their bases, as well as the presence of Basque galleons sunk in those ports, among them the San Juan (1565).

In 1981, she was awarded the Order of Canada for her pioneering work and for having made "one of the most outstanding contributions, in recent years, to the story of this nation". One of those whaling ports found by her, present-day Red Bay, Labrador, has been declared a National Historic Site of Canada (1979) and a World Heritage Site by UNESCO (June 2013). She was made an Officer of the Order of Newfoundland and Labrador in 2015.

== Family and youth ==
Selma Huxley was born in England in the midst of a family of intellectuals and scientists. Her father, Michael Huxley, a diplomat and the founder-editor of the Geographical Magazine, whose cousins included the writer Aldous Huxley and his brother the biologist Sir Julian Huxley (first Director General of UNESCO), was a grandson of the eminent English scientist Thomas Henry Huxley known as "Darwin's Bulldog". Her mother, Ottilie de Lotbinière Mills, was a granddaughter of the Canadian politician and conservationist Sir Henri-Gustave Joly de Lotbinière, who was a Cabinet minister in the Government of Canada and Premier of the province of Québec.

She spent her teenage years during the Second World War in England and the United States. When the war ended she studied at the universities of Paris and London.

== From England to Canada and the Basque Country ==
In 1950 she decided to spend some time visiting relatives in Canada where she settled in Montreal, working for the Yellow Pages, as a teacher and finally as the Librarian of the Arctic Institute of North America at the University of McGill.

There, in 1953, she met her future husband a young English architect, Brian Barkham, who was deeply fond of the Basque Country. In the summer of 1950, he had left England on motorcycle, with a fellow student of the University of London, John Stoddart, to study the rural architecture of Andalucía in southern Spain. But, due to various circumstances, he had ended up in the Basque Country studying its caseríos (farmhouses), which would be the subject of his degree thesis. He and his companion made good friends and fell in love with that region, with the result that they returned to the Basque Country in the summer of 1951.

Huxley could not have known then that that meeting was going to change her life so much, nor that in the future her own research on the Basque Country would lead her to make discoveries of importance to Basque and Canadian history. In 1954, the newly married couple moved to Ottawa, the capital of Canada, where Barkham set up an architecture practice and they had four children. Two years later, they visited the Basque Country where a friend, the priest Don Pío de Montoya, spoke to them about the old Basque presence in Canada. She became a Canadian citizen in 1964.

== Conceiving a plan for the future ==
In 1964, aged 37, Selma Barkham was left a widow with four children under the age of ten and had to find a way of making a living. She worked mostly for the National Historic Sites as a historian on various projects. These included the restoration of Louisbourg, the 18th-century French fortress and commercial-fishing port on Cape Breton Island on the Atlantic coast of Canada.

Doing that she became interested in European fishing voyages to that region in previous centuries, especially from the Basque Country with which she had personal ties. She developed a plan to research, in archives of Spain and France, Basque fisheries in Canada in the 16th and 17th centuries, thereby combining her personal and intellectual interests. She knew that for that she would have to learn Spanish, she already spoke English and French.

At that time, the late 1960s, it was recognized that there had been Basque cod fishing and whaling expeditions to Terra Nova in those centuries, but there was very little documentary information about them.

== Mexico and return to the Basque Country ==
In 1969, she decided to move to Mexico with her children by car, where she supported her family as an English teacher while learning Spanish. Three years later, in 1972, she applied from there for a grant from the Canada Council to begin her research. Following that, she put her family and belongings aboard a cargo ship bound for the Basque port of Bilbao.

However, she would not begin that research backed and financed by an institution, but rather on her own, with little means and against expectations. Shortly after her arrival in Bilbao, she received the news that her grant application had been turned down. It was thought that that work had already been done.

Barkham found herself without a job, with hardly any money and without clear perspectives. Those were difficult times but she did not give up. She believed that the archives could contain valuable information. During the first year she taught English and studied Spanish paleography in the evening at the University of Deusto. She received a thousand dollars from an anonymous Canadian donor, which allowed her to pay the rent, and she began making her first finds of importance in archives.

On the basis of these, in 1973 she managed to negotiate a contract with the Public Archives of Canada to locate in Spain documentation of interest to Canada. But the contract, which would be renewable, was part-time and there was not a budget for a telephone or car. The rest of the time she pursued her own research. That year she moved to the inland Basque town of Oñati, realizing the richness of the virtually unused Archivo Histórico de Protocolos de Gipuzkoa located there, where she was to live for twenty years.

== Archival finds and historical reconstruction ==
Over the years she researched in some 40 archives - parish, municipal, notarial, judicial, etc. - in places such as Tolosa, Bilbao, Burgos, Valladolid, Madrid, Seville and Lisbon. Little by little she discovered thousands of manuscripts from the 16th and 17th centuries, mostly in old Spanish, relating to the Basque fisheries in Terra Nova: including insurance policies, lawsuits, wills, charter-parties, crew agreements and lists of provisions and equipment. She also gradually found thousands of manuscripts to do with the other sectors of the Basque maritime economy such as shipbuilding, trade and fishing in Europe.

This detailed documentation allowed her to establish that the Basques had carried out, in different specific areas of Atlantic Canada, a prosperous cod fishery as well as a major whale fishery on an industrial scale during the 1500s. Furthering her analysis of these documents, she was able to reconstruct most aspects of those Basque fisheries particularly in the 16th century: their scale and evolution, the organization and financing of the expeditions, types of ships, composition of crews, routes and destinations, fishing and whaling seasons, shipwrecks, the sailors' life, work and death, their food and clothing, contact with Amerindians, markets, etc.

== Basque destinations in Canada ==
Regarding the destination of the ships until the end of that century the manuscripts showed Barkham that, in contrast to the cod fishing vessels, the whalers went to about twelve ports of an area of Terra Nova that the Basques called the "Gran Baya". She studied other written sources, such as sailing directions, and maps and charts of the time in places like the national libraries of England and France.

This enabled her to determine that the codfishers mostly used ports of what is now the south-east of the island of Newfoundland. In relation to the whaling activity she concluded that the "Gran Baya" corresponded to the present-day Strait of Belle Isle, which separates Newfoundland from Labrador, and that the old whaling ports, mentioned in the archival documents, were situated along the north shore of the Strait of Belle Isle, or the south coast of Labrador and a small section of the Quebec coast.

Crucially, she managed to identify the location of most of the individual whaling ports and their modern names. In this way, for example, Gradun became present-day Middle Bay, Puerto Bretón became Carrol Cove and Buttes, the most important port, became Red Bay. Therefore, she had not only made known the existence of a 16th-century Basque whaling industry in Labrador and adjacent Quebec but also their whaling ports.

The archives revealed three unique manuscripts from that century which had been written on that very coast: a sale of chalupas (whaleboats) (1572) and two wills (1577 and 1584). These were the oldest original civil documents written in Canada.

== Archaeological finds in Labrador and Quebec ==
Barkham knew from the documentation that in those ports there had to be remains of the Basque whaling presence, both on land and under water, and she wanted to find them. Backed by her research so far, she organized an archaeological survey expedition to southern Labrador in the summer of 1977, with a grant from the Royal Canadian Geographical Society. She explored several harbours along the coast and discovered archaeological remains of Basque whaling bases, including at Red Bay, thereby confirming her historical work in Europe. The expedition was joined by, among others, archaeologist James Tuck of Memorial University of Newfoundland.

Among the manuscripts found by the researcher are some that refer to the sinking of several 16th-century Basque whaling galleons in specific ports of the "Gran Baya", whose modern names she had identified on the Labrador coast: one from Pasaia (1563) in Los Hornos (Pinware Bay), the Madalena from Mutriku (1565) and the María from San Sebastián (1572) in Chateo (Chateau Bay/Henley Harbour), and the San Juan from Pasaia (1565) and the Madalena from Bordeaux (1574/75) in Buttes (Red Bay).

The year after Barkham's expedition, in 1978, a team of underwater archaeologists from Parks Canada led by Robert Grenier, basing themselves on the historian's discoveries and on the detailed information she had provided them, conducted surveys at Red Bay and Chateau Bay. They located a wreck in both harbours which turned out to be 16th-century whaling ships. The press conference announcing these finds was held at the Public Archives of Canada.

From then on, Barkham continued her historico-geographical work parallel to the land and underwater excavations, under Tuck and Grenier respectively, at Red Bay which was declared a National Historic Site of Canada in 1979.

In 1982, she organized another expedition, this time by sailing boat from Cape Breton Island to southern Labrador and the Quebec North Shore. She identified 17th-century Basque cod fishing locations on the west coast of Newfoundland while, at Middle Bay and Five Leagues Harbour on the Quebec coast, she found further archaeological remains of the 16th-century Basque whaling presence.

== Conferences, publications, recognition and UNESCO ==
This historian has presented the results of her research at numerous conferences and has published widely. Her most complete publication is: S. Huxley [Barkham], ed., Los vascos en el marco Atlántico Norte. Siglos XVI y XVII [The Basques in the North Atlantic in the 16th and 17th Centuries] (San Sebastián: Etor Editorial, 1987). Her work has featured extensively in the media, magazines, books and documentaries. In July 1985 it was, together with the archaeology at Red Bay, cover article of National Geographic magazine.

She has received a number of national and international honours and awards. The press release notifying her appointment to the Order of Canada (1981) refers to the fact that, besides her discoveries in Labrador, she "uncovered a period (1540-1600) in Canadian history about which almost nothing was known". In 1993, Memorial University of Newfoundland awarded her an Honorary Doctorate for having "sparked a wholesale revision of 16th-century Canadian history". In 2009, she was elected Fellow of the international organization Wings WorldQuest, which "recognizes and supports visionary women who are advancing scientific inquiry and environmental conservation".

In June 2013, the Red Bay National Historic Site was declared a World Heritage Site by UNESCO. This declaration reflects the importance of the contribution made by Barkham to the history of the Basque Country and of Canada.

== Awards, honours and prizes ==
=== Awards and prizes ===
Year	Awarding body	Award	Notes
1980	Royal Canadian Geographical Society	Gold Medal	The first woman so honoured - for “a classic piece of historical-geographical research”. The editorial in the Society’s magazine Canadian Geographic announcing the award states: “While her work is continuing [...] she already has done much to fill a great gap in our history from the time of Cartier and Roberval [...] to the arrival of Champlain early in the 1600s. [...] The Gold Medal is an occasional award, not an annual one, intended to recognize a particular achievement by one or more individuals in the general field of geography, also to provide an opportunity from time to time to recognize a significant national or international event. In Selma Barkham’s case, the Society felt that she deserved this recognition on both counts.” (Canadian Geographic, 100 (#3), 1980, p. 58.)
1985	University of Windsor, Canada	Honorary Doctorate	
1993	Memorial University of Newfoundland, Canada	Honorary Doctorate	The oration read on that occasion by the University orator refers to Barkham’s “re-discovery of the Basque element [which] has sparked a wholesale revision of 16th-century Canadian history.” (Memorial University of Newfoundland Gazette, June 3, 1993, p. 7.)
1999	Sabino Arana Foundation	1998 Prize for Culture	
2002	Government of Canada	Queen Elizabeth II Golden Jubilee Medal	Granted to “Canadians who have made outstanding and exemplary contributions to their communities or to Canada as a whole”
2012	Government of Canada	Queen Elizabeth II Diamond Jubilee Medal	
2013	Oceanographical Society of Gipuzkoa	Gold Medal	An occasional award “in recognition of her pioneering research and discoveries”
2014	Basque Government	Lagun Onari prize	

=== Honours ===
- 1981: appointed Member of the Order of Canada (awarded December 1981, conferred April 1982). The citation refers, among other things, to the facts that she “uncovered a period (1540-1600) in Canadian history about which almost nothing was known” and that “she discovered the presence of 400 year old Basque settlements [and sunken galleons] in Labrador”. It ends with the statement: “Selma Barkham has made one of the most outstanding contributions, in recent years, to the story of this nation.”
- 1981: elected Member of the Real Sociedad Bascongada de los Amigos del País (The Royal Society of Friends of the Basque Country).
- 1992: nominated Honorary Consul of Bilbao by the Chamber of Commerce, Industry and Navigation of Bilbao (the Basque Country, Spain). She is the only woman to be so nominated thus far.
- 1999: the city of St. John’s, Newfoundland named one of its streets after her stating: “Barkham’s rediscovery of the Basque presence has been recognised as one of the single most significant additions to the knowledge of early history of Newfoundland”.
- 2000: the town of Red Bay, Labrador named its town centre after her.
- 2008: a statement was read in the House of Assembly of the Province of Newfoundland and Labrador commemorating the 30th anniversary (1977-2007) of Barkham’s discovery of the 16th-century Basque whaling site in Red Bay, Labrador, which has given that port international recognition. This anniversary was celebrated in Red Bay with a ceremony in the historian’s honour.
- 2009: elected Fellow of Wings WorldQuest, an international organisation which “recognises and supports visionary women who are advancing scientific inquiry and environmental conservation and shares their knowledge with the world.” Her election was mainly in recognition of her discovery of thousands of 16th-century manuscripts in Spanish and Basque archives, and of 16th-century Basque whaling sites on the south coast of Labrador.
- 2010: received a tribute from the Association of Basque Schools of Bizkaia (Asociación de Ikastolas de Bizkaia) (Ibilaldia 2010) for her work “helping and promoting Basque language and culture” in subjects related to the sea.
- 2012: elected Corresponding Member of the Royal Academy of History and Fine Arts of Burgos, Spain.

== Bibliography ==
=== Author ===
- Barkham, Selma (1989). The Basque Coast of Newfoundland. Newfoundland, Canada: Great Northern Peninsula Development Corp. ISBN 978-0929108001.

=== Editor ===
- Huxley, Selma (1987). Los vascos en el marco Atlántico Norte. Siglos XVI y XVII. San Sebastián: Etor Editorial. ISBN 9788485527298.

=== Journals ===
Barkham published articles in the following journals:

- Archivaria
- Arctic
- Bulletin of the Association for Preservation Technology
- Canadian Geographic
- Canadian Historical Review
- Geographical
- Newfoundland Studies

=== Contributor ===
Barkham contributed to the following publications:

- Mollat, M (1975). Course et Piraterie. Paris, France. - “Privateering: The North American Dimension to 1625”
- Douglass, W A (1977). Anglo-American Contributions to Basque Studies: Essays in Honor of Jon Bilbao. Reno, Nevada: Desert Research Institute Publications on the Social Sciences. - “Guipuzcoan Shipping in 1571 with Particular Reference to the Decline of the Trans-Atlantic Fishing Industry”
- Story, G M (1987). Early European Settlement and Exploitation in Atlantic Canada. Newfoundland, Canada: Memorial University of Newfoundland. ISBN 978-0889010796. - “Documentary Evidence for 16th Century Basque Whaling Ships in the Strait of Belle Isle”
- Cole Harris, R (1987). The Historical Atlas of Canada. Toronto, Canada: University of Toronto Press. ISBN 978-0802024954. - “Plate 22: The 16th Century Fishery”
- Keay, John (1991). The Royal Geographical Society History of World Exploration. London, UK: Hamlyn. ISBN 978-0792453253. - “North America”
- Bedini, Silvio A (1992). Christopher Columbus Encyclopedia. New York, USA: Simon Schuster. ISBN 978-0131426627. - “Basque exploration and discovery”
- Bourgoin, J; Carpine-Lancre, J (1993). L'Aventure maritime, du golfe de Gascogne à Terre-Neuve. Toronto, Canada: University of Toronto Press. - "Aperçu de l'évolution de la pêche sur les côtes de l'Est canadien”
- Warkentin, G; Podruchny, C (2001). Decentring the Renaissance: Canada and Europe in Multidisciplinary Perspective, 1500-1700. Toronto, Canada: University of Toronto Press. ISBN 9780802081490. - “The Mentality of the Men behind Sixteenth-Century Spanish Voyages to Terranova”
