= Saddle Island, Newfoundland and Labrador =

Island in Newfoundland and Labrador, Canada

Saddle Head
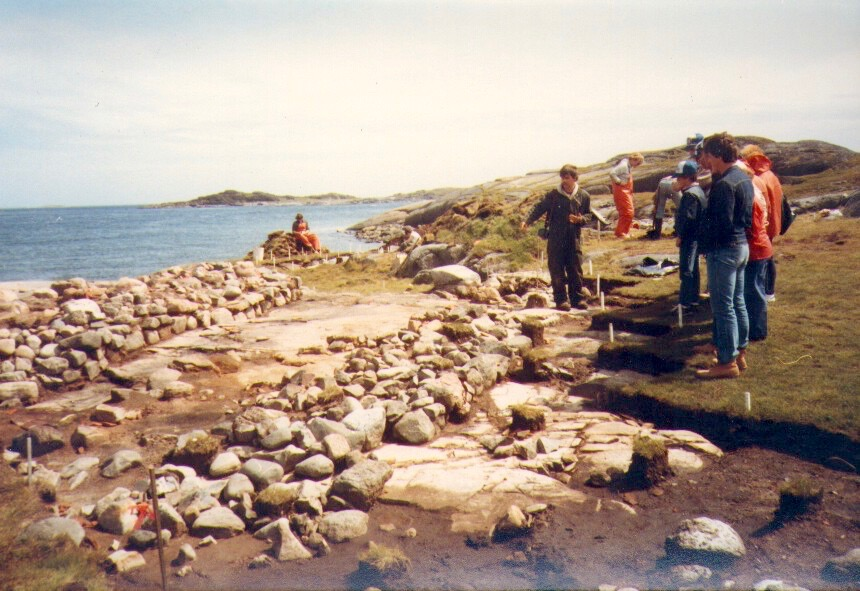
- Remains of a Basque settlement on Saddle Island
- Interactive map of Saddle Head

Geography
- Location: Newfoundland and Labrador, Canada
- Coordinates: 51°43′27″N 56°25′51″W

Administration
- Canada

Saddle Island is a small island containing an abandoned settlement in Newfoundland and Labrador.

Saddle Island is part of the Red Bay UNESCO site, a 16th-century Basque whaling station. On the island are the locations of a number of former tryworks sites and of cooperages. In two places, there are broken ceramic roofing tiles indicating the locations of Basque buildings. There is also a cemetery from which samples of clothing were obtained so that reconstructions can be displayed in the museum on the mainland.
