= Murray Premises =

Coordinates: 47°34′07.67″N 52°42′29.52″W

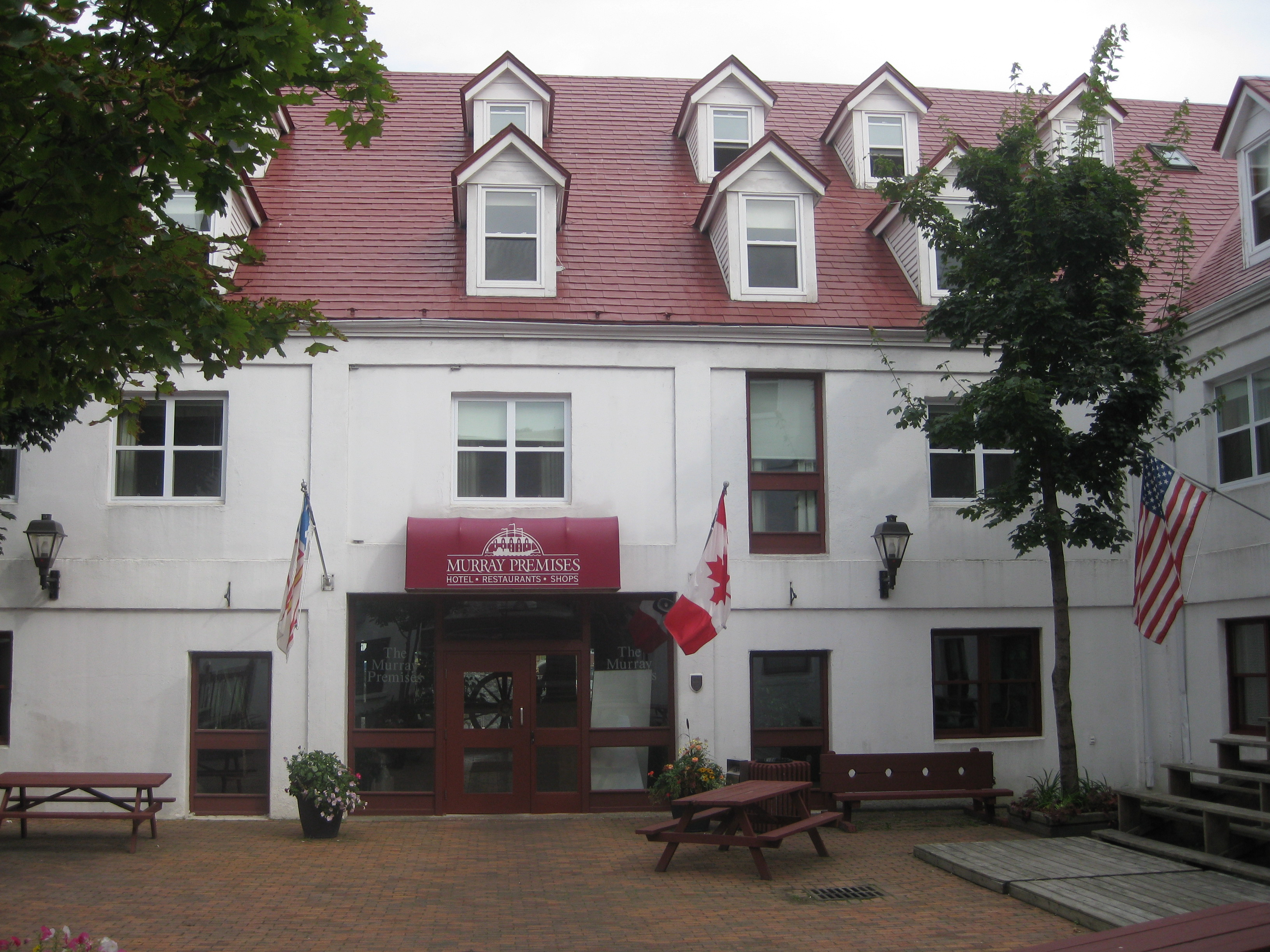
Courtyard view of Murray Premises

The Murray Premises is a National Historic Site of Canada located in downtown St. John's, Newfoundland and Labrador. The Murray Premises was renovated in 1979 and now contains office suites, restaurants, retail stores and, most recently, a boutique hotel. The buildings once served as a fishery premises, with facilities for drying and packaging fish and warehouses for fish, barrels and other items. The oldest of the buildings is the one facing on Beck's Cove. It was built after the 1846 fire and for a time served as both shop and house.
