= List of National Historic Sites of Canada in France =

This is a list of National Historic Sites of Canada (French: Lieux historiques nationaux du Canada) in France. Canada has designated only two sites outside its borders as National Historic Sites, both of which are war memorials in northern France commemorating Canadian and Newfoundland losses in the First World War.

Similar to the Sites, three National Historic Events have been designated in France, one related to the First World War, and two related to the Second World War. Both Sites and Events (and those for National Historic Persons, as well) are marked using the same style of federal plaque. The markers do not indicate which designation—a Site, Event, or Person—a subject has been given.

This list uses the designation names as recognized by the Historic Sites and Monuments Board of Canada, which may not necessarily be the official or colloquial names of the sites.

== National Historic Sites ==
Media related to National Historic Sites of Canada in France at Wikimedia Commons

Site	Date(s)	Designated	Location	Description	Image
Beaumont-Hamel Newfoundland Memorial	1925 (unveiled)	1996	Beaumont-Hamel; 50°4′25″N 2°38′53″E	A memorial site in France dedicated to the commemoration of Dominion of Newfoundland forces members who were killed during First World War; the preserved battlefield park encompasses the grounds over which the Newfoundland Regiment made their unsuccessful attack on 1 July 1916 during the first day of the Battle of the Somme	Beaumont-Hamel Newfoundland Memorial
Vimy Ridge	1936 (unveiled)	1996	Vimy; 50°22′46″N 02°46′25″E	A memorial site dedicated to the memory of Canadian Expeditionary Force members killed during the First World War; it also serves as the place of commemoration for First World War Canadian soldiers killed or presumed dead in France who have no known grave	Canadian First World War memorial at Vimy Ridge

== See also ==
- Military history of Canada during World War I
- Canadian war memorials
- Monument historique
