= Jon Bilbao =

Basque nationalist

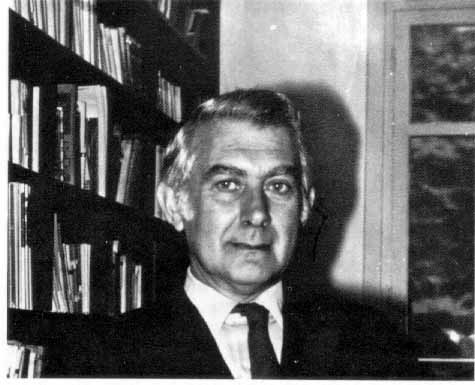
Image of Jon Bilbao

Juan Manuel Bilbao Azkarreta, also known as Jon Bilbao or Jon Bilbao Azkarreta (31 October 1914 – 23 May 1994) was a university instructor, a bibliographer, and an activist for Basque nationalism. He compiled the bibliographic section of the Enciclopedia general ilustrada del País Vasco (1970), and the monumental Eusko-bibliographia: diccionario de bibliografía vasca (10 volumes, 1970–1981, with further supplements), which has been described as "one of the most significant reference works on Basque studies".

== Biography ==
=== Early life and education ===
Juan Manuel Bilbao Azkarreta was born on October 31, 1914, in Cayey, Puerto Rico. His father, Juan Bilbao, born in Getxo (Bizkaia), had emigrated "to the Americas" at the age of 12, in 1870. There he married Matilde Azkarreta. In 1917 the family moved to the Basque country, where Jon Bilbao spent his childhood and youth.

Bilbao Azkarreta's secondary education was at least partly at the Jesuit college in Bilbao. In 1932 obtained the degree of Bachelor of Science at the University of Valladolid. Between 1932 and 1936 he attended the Universidad Central de Madrid, pursuing studies in Philosophy and Literature, specializing in History. He took a degree in Medieval History of Spain with Latin and Arabic as the language requirements. He then returned to Bilbao, where there were plans to open a Basque University, but after the outbreak of the Spanish Civil War he enrolled with the Eusko Gudarosteak (Basque Battalions) as a lieutenant of engineers, serving 1936–1937.

=== First Exile ===
On 20 June 1937, the day after the fall of Bilbao to Nationalist troops, Jon Bilbao managed to escape at night in the motor launch "Sagrada Familia" from Zierbena (Bizkaia) to Bayonne. Two months later, he embarked in Bordeaux for Guadeloupe, later making his way to Puerto Rico. He made contact with exiled professors such as María Zambrano at the University of Puerto Rico, but in 1938 opted to enroll at Harvard University for further study. He spent many hours in Boston Public Library, sifting through dictionaries, encyclopedias and biographies to fill the filecards that were eventually to form the basis of his monumental Bibliografia Eusko, a standard work of reference in Basque studies.

Moving from Boston to New York, he enrolled at Columbia University where he resumed the studies he had begun in Madrid, obtaining his degree in May 1939 with a dissertation on the work of Lope García Salazar, a 15th-century Basque historian, working under Professor Federico de Onís. He also followed the courses in Phonetics and Phonology taught by Tomás Navarro Tomás. In 1940-1942 he pursued doctoral studies at the University of California Berkeley, followed by a period as instructor of Spanish, first at the Institute of Linguistics in South Carolina (1942) and then at Columbia University (1942–1944), where he was admitted as a doctoral candidate in 1945. Circumstances prevented him from completing his doctorate.

He had in 1939 been appointed a deputy director of the "Basque Government in Exile". In this capacity he was sent on a study and fund-raising trip to Boise (Idaho) in 1940, wrote in support of the Basque cause with M. de la Sota and A. Irala, and worked with the Belgian Office for Latin America as associate editor of the Journal Belge (1944) and Ambos Mundos (1945–46). His activities in Basque-Belgian co-operation during the struggle against fascism led to him being made a Knight of the Belgian Order of the Crown after the end of the Second World War.

In 1943, he was granted U.S. citizenship, registering his name as Jon Bilbao.

=== Return to the Basque Country ===
In 1947, after a decade in exile (1937–1947), he was able to return to the Basque Country, where he worked for three years (1947–1950) with the ethnologist J.M. Barandiaran as editorial secretary to Eusko Jakintza (Spanish title Revista de Estudios Vascos). Thanks to his American passport, Jon Bilbao was able to travel to Madrid, where he conducted research in 1949–1950.

From 1950 to 1954, J. Bilbao lived in Cuba, where he worked on his book Vascos en Cuba: 1492-1511, published by Ekin in Buenos Aires in 1958.

From 1954 he lived in Getxo with his wife and children, and was active for the Basque nationalist cause. In 1958 he was arrested by Franco's police. Thanks to his American passport he was not imprisoned but in 1960 he was declared "persona non grata" and expelled from the country. Leaving his family in Getxo, he went to live in Biarritz, but after a year was expelled as an undesirable alien by the French police. On 8 December 1960 he decided to return to the U.S.

=== Second Exile ===
Continuing to work on his monumental bibliography, Jon Bilbao taught Spanish at Georgetown University in 1964–1965, and at the Naval Academy in Annapolis, Maryland in 1966–1968.

In 1968 the director of the newly established Center for Basque Studies at the University of Nevada, Reno, the young anthropologist William A. Douglass, invited Jon Bilbao to take up the position of instructor in Basque Studies. His academic duties included teaching a course on Basque history, and working to extend UNR's Basque Collection, making it "the best library in the Basque diaspora", from 3,000 volumes in 1968 to about 25,000 in 1980, the year of his retirement. In 1970 the first volume of his ten-volume Eusko Bibliographia was printed. The work was completed in 1981, and was followed by supplements in 1985 and 1996.

In 1970 he was appointed director of the "Basque Studies Summer Courses", in the decade 1970-1980 was organized five in Ustaritz, Arantzazu Loiola, Vitoria-Gasteiz and Oñate. He was also one of the organizers of NABO (North American Basque Organizations, 1972). In the summer of 1971, with his colleague and friend W. A. Douglass, he toured eight Latin American countries, visiting universities, libraries, and Basque centers in search of a wealth of material that would result in the book Amerikanuak: Basques in the New World (1974). It is a history of the Basques in the Americas.

=== Retirement ===
Following his retirement from the University of Reno in 1980 he returned to the Basque Country full of enthusiasm to undertake two new projects: the Institute of Basque Studies Library and Institute for the Study of the Basque Diaspora. During the first two years, the winds were favorable due to the aid of several Basque entities: the three Councils, the Basque Government, the Universities of Reno and the Basque Country and the Caja de Ahorros Municipal de Vitoria who generously allowed him to move to the Institution Sancho el Sabio. It provides in-house library of Getxo and weekly working time will alternate between his people and Vitoria. Over time, the Department of Culture of the Basque Government financial aid is decreasing and J. Bilbao created the "International Association of Basque Literature" with the help of prominent personalities of Basque culture. Moreover, in 1987 founded the "Harrilucea Association for the Study of History" with a desire to open a museum and a library in Getxo. Unfortunately some of these plans were the unfinished Symphony "Unfinished" by Schubert. The initial hopes and expectations were followed the sadness and disappointment in him and some of his friends and collaborators.

=== Marriage and children ===
On 10 February 1945, Jon Bilbao married Marta Saralegui (daughter of a benefactor of the Basque cause in Cuba) in Havana, Cuba, with the president of the Basque Government in Exile as his best man. From this marriage a daughter, Amal, was born in 1948 in Biarritz, and a son, Jon, in 1953 in Havana. His first marriage ending in divorce, he married again in 1985 with an American woman, Gayle Slavin, in Reno (NV).

=== Death and afterward ===
On March 30, 1994, J. Bilbao suffered the first stroke while working in Vitoria and was admitted to the Sanatorium Gorliz in a rehabilitation program. After a second attack that could not be restored, died on May 23 at the age of 79. The Basque newspaper Deia printed three obituaries, one by W. A. Douglass, one by L. White, and one by J. Zulaika.

== Awards ==
His work was recognized by the Basque institutions and J. Bilbao was distinguished on several occasions: UNR professor emeritus in 1981, corresponding member of the Basque Academy in 1973 and honorary member since June 19, 1987; partner Bascongada of the Society of Friends of the Country since November 20 of 1981; member of the Hall of Fame in 1988 by the Society of Basque Studies in USA, doctor honoris causa by the UPV / EHU since November 9, 1995.

== Bibliography ==
=== Bibliographies ===
- Enciclopedia general ilustrada del País Vasco. Cuerpo C. Bibliografía. 1970.
- Eusko Bibliographia. 10 volumes, 1970–1981.
- Eusko Bibliographia (1976-1980). 3 volumes, 1985.
- Eusko Bibliographia 1981-1985. 1996.

=== Books ===
- Vascos en Cuba. 1492-1511. 1958.
- Amerikanuak: Basques in the New World (with William A. Douglass). 1975.

=== Articles (select list) ===
- "La cultura tradicional en la obra de Lope García Salazar", Eusko Jakintza, 1948, II: 229–264.
- "Pierre Loti y el País Vasco", Gernika, 1950, nº 11: 64–67.
- "Tres cartas de Unamuno sobre el habla de Bilbao y los "maketos" de Vizcaya", Boletín del Instituto Americano de Estudios Vascos, 1955, VI, nº 21: 67–79.
- "The Basque Library of the University of Nevada", Basque Studies Program Newsletter, 1969, nº 2: 7–8.
- "First Basque Studies Summer Session Abroad", Basque Studies Program Newsletter, 1970, nº 4: 3–4.
- "The Basque Governors of California", Basque Studies Program Newsletter, 1970, nº 3: 3–5.
- "Consul of the United States of the Port of Bilbao", Basque Studies Program Newsletter, 1976, nº 14: 4–8.
- "Basques in the Philippine Islands", Basque Studies Program Newsletter, 1979, nº 20:3-6.
- "Sobre la Leyenda de Jaun Zuria primer Señor de Vizcaya", Amigos del País, hoy. Bilbao, 1982, I, 235–263.
- "La Biblioteca vasca de la Universidad de Nevada. Reno", Revista Internacional de Estudios Vascos, 1987: 165–174.
- "Conferencia pronunciada por Jon Bilbao Azkarreta en la Biblioteca Nacional", Bilduma, 1994, nº 8: 119–137.

== Sources ==
=== Books published in his honour ===
- Anglo-American contributions to Basque studies: essays in honor of Jon Bilbao, edited by William A. Douglass, Richard W. Etulain, and William H. Jacobsen Jr. 1977.
- Jon Bilbao, bibliógrafo: referencia del homenaje rendido al amigo de número y bibliógrafo, Jon Bilbao Azkarreta, por la Comisión de Bizkaia de la Real Sociedad Bascongada de los Amigos del País, en Asamblea de la misma, celebrada en Bilbao el 29 de septiembre de 1994, actualizada con textos adicionales. 1996.

=== Other works ===
- Arana, J.A. "Jon Bilbao Azkarreta", Euskera, 1994, 2: 611–615.
- Arteche, J. "Vascos de Cuba", Boletín de la Sociedad Bascongada de los Amigos del País, 1959, XIV: 569–570.
- Aulestia, G. "Lo vasco y los vascos en la Universidad Americana", Revista Internacional de Estudios Vascos, 1998, 1, nº 43: 89–92.
- Aurre, G. "Eusko bibliographia umezurtz", Muga, 1994, nº 89: 48–51.
- Garriga, G. "Vascos en Cuba: 1452-1511", Boletín Americano del Instituto de Estudios Vascos, 1958, IX, nº 34: 135–136.
- Granja, J.L. "La hemeroteca vasca de la Universidad de Nevada Reno", Revista Internacional de Estudios Vascos, 1987, XXXII, nº 1: 175–179.
- Herce, A. "Jon Bilbao, un bibliógrafo 'desestabilizador' ", Arbola, 1986, nº 0: 28–30.
- Knörr, E. "Una tarea ingente", El Correo Español El Pueblo Vasco, 24-V-1994: 50.
- Lasa Apalategui, J. "Bibliógrafo vasco en la Universidad de Reno Estado de Nevada, USA", Universidad Vasca, Vitoria, Itxaropena, 1976: 109–119.
- Laxalt, R. Foreword to Amerikanuak: Basques in the New World, Reno, University of Nevada, 1975.
- Moreno, L. "La Eusko Bibliographia de Jon Bilbao", Eusko Bibliographia 1981-1985 vol. I, Leioa, UPV/EHU: XXI-XLVI.
- Moreno, L. "Jon Bilbao Azkarreta y su Eusko Bibliographia: una vida al servicio de su país y de la ciencia", Bilduma, 1994, nº 8: 101–111.
- San Martín, J. "Eusko Bibliograhia", Egan, 1978–1979, XXXVIII, 332–333.
- San Sebastián, K. The Basque Archives. Vascos en Estados Unidos (1938-1943), Donostia, Ed. Txertoa, 1991: 393–509.
- Urza, C. "Jon Bilbao en Reno: 1968-1983", Cuadernos de Cultura, Vitoria-Gasteiz, Diputación Foral de Álava, 1983, nº 4: 113–117.
