= Maritime Archaic =

Historical Indigenous people of Newfoundland

The Maritime Archaic is a North American cultural complex of the Late Archaic along the coast of Newfoundland, the Canadian Maritimes and northern New England. The Maritime Archaic began in approximately 7000 BC and lasted until approximately 3500 BC, corresponding with the arrival of the Paleo-Eskimo groups who may have outcompeted the Maritime Archaic for resources. The culture consisted of sea-mammal hunters in the subarctic who used wooden boats. Maritime Archaic sites have been found as far south as Maine and as far north as Labrador. Their settlements included longhouses, and boat-topped temporary or seasonal houses. They engaged in long-distance trade, as shown by white Ramah chert from northern Labrador being found as far south as Maine.

The Maritime Archaic is one cultural complex among several of the Archaic stage for North American peoples. It had been long postulated that the most likely direct descendants of the Maritime Archaic culture were the Beothuk of Newfoundland. The latter, through susceptibility to Eurasian diseases, conflict with neighboring native groups, and malnourishment after European persecution pushed them inland and away from the fish and marine mammals that had been a staple of their diet, succumbed to erosion of their population base, which was small to begin with, and disappeared in the 19th century as a distinct tribe.

Archaeogenetic research in 2017 established, however, that the Maritime Archaic people had nothing genetically in common with the Inuit, nor with the Beothuk, who later inhabited the same area after the climatic conditions changed. A study published in Current Biology compared the mitochondrial DNA of 74 individuals, 19 Beothuk, 53 Maritime Archaic, and two Paleo-Eskimo, and found that these populations were not at all related.

Another significant Maritime Archaic find are the "Red Ochre Culture" burials throughout the Northeast United States (their attribution to MA is not generally accepted). They may represent the last phases of the Maritime Archaic, as they contain significant finds of white chert artifacts common to other Maritime Archaic sites, but may also represent a distinct people. This issue is currently debated among scholars.

If the hypothesis of the Red Ochre as the last state of the Maritime Archaic period is accepted, then the latter is best known from a mortuary site in Newfoundland at Port au Choix. This site revealed over 100 graves embellished with red ochre. The graves contained many elaborate artifacts, including barbed bone points; daggers of ivory, antler, or bone; toggling harpoons; shell-beaded clothing; and a burial suit made from more than 200 skins of the now-extinct great auk. These finds indicated a stratified society with trade and some level of social complexity.

== See also ==
- Paleo-Eskimo
