= List of World Heritage Sites in Canada =

Location of World Heritage Sites in Canada

The United Nations Educational, Scientific and Cultural Organization (UNESCO) World Heritage Sites are places of importance to cultural or natural heritage as described in the UNESCO World Heritage Convention, established in 1972. Cultural heritage consists of monuments (such as architectural works, monumental sculptures, or inscriptions), groups of buildings, and sites (including archaeological sites). Natural heritage consists of natural features (physical and biological formations), geological and physiographical formations (including habitats of threatened species of animals and plants), and natural sites which are important from the point of view of science, conservation, or natural beauty. Canada accepted the convention on 23 July 1976. There are 22 World Heritage Sites in Canada, with a further 10 on the tentative list.

The first two sites in Canada added to the list were L'Anse aux Meadows and Nahanni National Park Reserve, both at the Second Session of the World Heritage Committee, held in Washington, D.C., in 1978. The most recent sites listed were Tr’ondëk-Klondike and Anticosti, both in 2023. Two sites are shared with the United States. Ten sites are listed for their cultural significance, eleven for natural significance, and one, Pimachiowin Aki, is listed for both. Canada has served as a member of the World Heritage Committee four times: 1976–1978, 1985–1991, 1995–2001, and 2005–2009.

== World Heritage Sites ==
UNESCO lists sites under ten criteria; each entry must meet at least one of the criteria. Criteria i through vi are cultural, and vii through x are natural.

* Transnational site

World Heritage Sites
Site	Image	Location	Year listed	UNESCO data	Description
L'Anse aux Meadows National Historic Site	Grass-covered house surrounded by a fence, sea in the distance	Newfoundland and Labrador	1978	4bis; iv (cultural)	L'Anse aux Meadows is an 11th-century Viking settlement at the tip of the Great Northern Peninsula, and is the earliest documented European settlement in the New World. The complex contains eight turf houses: three dwellings, one forge, and four workshops used for ship repair. The architecture and artifacts are in the same style as those from Norse Greenland and Iceland from the same period. A minor boundary modification of the site took place in 2017.
Nahanni National Park	Waterfalls on a river, surrounded by granite peaks	Northwest Territories	1978	24; vii, viii (natural)	The park is listed for its outstanding geomorphological features. The rivers of the park, in particular the South Nahanni River, carved deep canyons through the mountain ranges and created several waterfalls (Virginia Falls pictured). There are karst landforms, including limestone cave systems. The park is undisturbed and is home to animals of boreal forests, including grizzly bear, wolf, and caribou.
Dinosaur Provincial Park	Waterfalls on a river, surrounded by granite peaks	Alberta	1979	71; vii, viii (natural)	The area is a practically undisturbed semi-arid steppe with badlands topography. Fossils of more than 44 species, 34 genera, and 10 families of dinosaurs have been discovered in the park, representing every known group of Cretaceous dinosaurs. More than 150 complete skeletons have been unearthed, together with several non-dinosaur fossils. They provide insight into the life in the area 77 to 75 million years ago.
SG̱ang Gwaay	Wooden totem poles in a forest	British Columbia	1981	157; iii (cultural)	This site preserves a 19th-century village of the Haida people on the Haida Gwaii archipelago off the British Columbia Coast. The site comprises the remains of large cedar longhouses and several carved mortuary and memorial totem poles (some examples pictured). They illustrate the art and traditions of the Haida people.
Head-Smashed-In Buffalo Jump	A cliff overlooking a valley	Alberta	1981	158bis; vi (cultural)	Buffalo jump was a traditional way of hunting bison by the Plains Indians over nearly six millennia. Knowing the topography and bison behavior, the hunters directed bison herds into drive lanes that ended at a cliff, resulting in bison falling to their deaths. This site is one of the prominent examples of this tradition. The bison carcasses were then butchered and processed at a camp below. A minor modification of the site boundaries took place in 2021.
Wood Buffalo National Park	Lake and fir forest scenery	Alberta, Northwest Territories	1983	256; vii, ix, x (natural)	The park covers large areas of grass and sedge meadows, boreal forests, lakes, rivers, and the world's largest inland delta, the Peace–Athabasca Delta. There are also salt plains and gypsum karst features. It is home to North America's largest population of wild bison, and is a breeding ground for the endangered whooping crane.
Canadian Rocky Mountain Parks	Lake, snow-covered mountains, and fir forest scenery	Alberta, British Columbia	1984	304bis; vii, viii (natural)	Seven national parks in the Canadian Rockies, two of which were added to the site in 1990, exhibit mountain landscapes of exceptional natural beauty, with glaciers, ice fields, alpine meadows, cave systems, lakes, and waterfalls. The Burgess Shale formation, one of the world's most important fossil assemblies, is located here. It preserves the remains of soft-bodied animals dating to the Cambrian period, providing key insight into the development of major animal phyla.
Historic District of Old Québec	Old town with houses built in stone and several flags of Quebec	Quebec	1985	300; iv, vi (cultural)	Founded by the French in the 17th century as the capital of New France and then developed by the British after the 1760s, the old part of Quebec illustrates different stages of European colonial settlement in North America. In addition to the well-preserved urban centre, the fortifications of the city, with bastions, ramparts, and other defensive structures, are unique north of Mexico.
Gros Morne National Park	Mountain landscape with Western Lake Pond in the foreground.	Newfoundland and Labrador	1987	419; vii, viii (natural)	With deep ocean crust and rocks of the Earth's mantle lying exposed, the park illustrates plate tectonics and continental drift. Landlocked freshwater fjords and glacier-scoured headlands in an ocean setting contribute to the natural beauty of this wilderness area.
Kluane / Wrangell–St. Elias / Glacier Bay / Tatshenshini-Alsek*	Scenery with mountains, a river, and a fir forest	Yukon, British Columbia	1992	72ter; vii, viii, ix, x (natural)	The four national parks and protected areas spanning the border between the United States and Canada contain the world's largest non-polar ice field and numerous large glaciers. The area, shaped by glacial and continuous tectonic activity, comprises different types of habitats, from high mountains above 16,000 ft (5,000 m) to ocean, coastal forests, and river valleys. Some of the important animal species include grizzly bear, caribou, Dall sheep, and mountain goat. The rivers are spawning grounds for salmon that then migrate to the ocean. Glacier Bay (US) was originally listed alone in 1979. Kluane (Canada, pictured) and Wrangell–St. Elias (US) were added to the site in 1992, and Tatshenshini-Alsek (Canada) in 1994.
Waterton-Glacier International Peace Park*	A mountain lake, surrounded by trees	Alberta	1995	354rev; vii, ix (natural)	This site comprises the Waterton Lakes National Park (pictured) in Canada and the Glacier National Park in the US. Both parks are known for their outstanding scenic beauty due to mountains and glacial landforms. The park straddles the Continental Divide and includes the Triple Divide Peak. The mountains meet the prairie without intervening foothills and the geography allowed the animal and plant species typical of Pacific Northwest to spread inland. This resulted in a high number of animal and plant species present in a small area.
Old Town Lunenburg	Red wooden houses at the shore	Nova Scotia	1995	741; iv, v (cultural)	Founded by the British in 1753, Lunenburg is the best surviving example of a planned British colonial settlement in North America. The grid plan from the 18th century has been preserved, as well as some of the wooden buildings from that period. The community is based on the offshore Atlantic fishery.
Miguasha National Park	Cliff at the water margin, forest on top	Quebec	1999	686rev; viii (natural)	The park encompasses parts of the Escuminac Formation, a geological formation dating to the Devonian period 370 million years ago. It is an exceptional paleontologist site, yielding large numbers of exceptionally well-preserved fossils of fish, in particular the lobe-finned fish that later gave rise to the tetrapods. Invertebrate and plant fossils have been found at the site as well.
Rideau Canal	A small canal with a set of locks leading from a river near a large city.	Ontario	2007	1221; i, iv (cultural)	The oldest continuously operated canal system in North America, with much of its original structure intact, connects Ottawa, on the Ottawa River, to Kingston, on Lake Ontario. It opened in 1832 as a precaution in case of war with the United States, allowing the transit of steam-powered ships. The site includes several defensive works in Kingston. The Ottawa Locks at Colonel By Valley are pictured.
Joggins Fossil Cliffs	A tree trunk fossil embedded in a cliff	Nova Scotia	2008	1285; viii (natural)	The site at Joggins has produced one of the best fossil records from the Carboniferous period, in particular from 318 to 303 million years ago. During that time, the area was covered by rainforests, the remains of which are the main sources of today's coal. In addition to plant fossils (a lycopsid pictured), the remains of the earliest amniotes illustrate the evolution of terrestrial vertebrates.
Landscape of Grand Pré	Grand Pré memorial church and statue of Évangeline.	Nova Scotia	2012	1404; v, vi (cultural)	The cultural landscape was shaped by the Acadians, descendants of the French settlers, in the 17th and 18th centuries. Using dyke-building techniques called aboiteau, the farmers reclaimed salt marshes from the tidal areas and repurposed them for agricultural use. The water management system remains in use in the present day. The site is also inscribed as a memorial to the Acadian way of life and their deportation, which started in 1755, known as the Grand Dérangement.
Red Bay Basque Whaling Station	Red Bay houses seen from the harbour	Newfoundland and Labrador	2013	1412; iii, iv (cultural)	The Basque whaling station was founded in the 1530s and was used for about 70 years. It provided support for hunting and processing of whales to produce whale oil for sale in Europe. With the archaeological remains illustrating different stages of the pre-industrial whaling process, Red Bay is the best preserved station from that period.
Mistaken Point	An Ediacaran fossil found at Mistaken Point, a coin for size comparison	Newfoundland and Labrador	2016	1497; viii (natural)	The reserve is home to the namesake Mistaken Point Formation, which contains one of the most diverse and well-preserved collections of Precambrian fossils in the world. Ediacaran fossils, dating from 580 to 560 million years ago, constitute the oldest known remnants of multicellular life on Earth.
Pimachiowin Aki	A rock wall at the edge of a body of water.	Manitoba, Ontario	2018	1415rev; iii, vi, ix (mixed)	The cultural landscape of Pimachiowin Aki is the ancestral home of four Anishinaabe First Nations communities, the Poplar River, Little Grand Rapids, Pauingassi, and Bloodvein. It comprises a network of habitation sites, ceremonial sites, trade routes, and waterways. From the natural perspective, the area represents the largest example of the North American boreal shield, with animals such as moose, wolf, wolverine, and lake sturgeon.
Writing-on-Stone / Áísínai’pi	Rock carvings of humans in an abstract fashion	Alberta	2019	1597; iii (cultural)	The cultural landscape consisting of prairie and coulee habitats is sacred to the Blackfoot people. For millennia, people carved rock art with spiritual meaning on the sandstone hoodoos along the Milk River, with the oldest carvings being around 3,000 years old.
Tr’ondëk-Klondike	Klondikers carrying supplies ascending the Chilkoot Pass, 1898.	Yukon	2023	1564; iv (cultural)	The discovery of gold and the subsequent gold rush at the end of the 19th century brought tens of thousands of prospectors to Klondike (a historical photo from Chilkoot Pass in 1898 is pictured). The interactions between the newcomers and the indigenous Tr’ondëk Hwëch’in people resulted in a unique cultural landscape with camps, towns, and mining infrastructure.
Anticosti	Satellite image of the island	Quebec	2023	1686; viii (natural)	The fossil assemblies at Anticosti Island date from the late Ordovician to early Silurian periods, 450 to 435 million years ago. They offer an exceptional insight in the succession of marine life over 15 million years, including the near disappearance of marine species in the Late Ordovician mass extinction.

== Tentative list ==
In addition to sites inscribed on the World Heritage List, member states can maintain a list of tentative sites that they may consider for nomination. Nominations for the World Heritage List are only accepted if the site was previously listed on the tentative list. Canada lists 10 properties on its tentative list.

Tentative sites
Site	Image	Location	Year listed	UNESCO criteria	Description
Gwaii Haanas	Temperate rainforest scenery	British Columbia	2004	iii, v, vi, vii, ix, x (mixed)	This nomination comprises parts of the Haida Gwaii archipelago. It includes the SG̱ang Gwaay World Heritage Site, two other Haida villages, and natural areas. The islands are covered by old-growth temperate rainforest (example pictured) and surrounded by the sea which is home to porpoise, orca, and sea lion. The islands are also an important stopover for migratory birds.
Ivvavik / Vuntut / Herschel Island (Qikiqtaruk)	Landscape with lakes and tundra	Yukon	2004	iv, v, vii, viii, x (mixed)	Two national parks (Vuntut pictured) and an arctic island are rich in wildlife. They are home to three species of bear, Dall sheep, moose, and large herds of caribou. This is the home of the Inuvialuit and Vuntut people. As the area was not glaciated during the Last Glacial Maximum, it formed a part of the Beringia land bridge, with numerous archaeological assemblies testifying the settlement of the Americas.
Quttinirpaaq	Glaciated mountains and arctic tundra	Nunavut	2004	iii, vii, viii, x (mixed)	Encompassing the northernmost part of Canada, the park comprises mountains, glaciers, ice shelves, and fjords. The polar desert supports populations of muskox, arctic hare, wolf, and Peary caribou. As demonstrated by the archaeological sites, the area has been occupied by different cultures for over four millennia, including the pre-Dorset, Dorset and Thule people.
Hecate Strait and Queen Charlotte Sound Glass Sponge Reefs Marine Protected Area	A yellow sea sponge in dark waters	British Columbia	2018	viii, ix, x (natural)	Sponge reefs were common in the Jurassic and Cretaceous periods but are now rare. The reefs in Hecate Strait and Queen Charlotte Sound are considered to be the world's largest living reefs of that type. The sponge colonies are estimated to be 9,000 years old. The reefs provide shelter to juvenile fish on otherwise featureless seabed. A cloud sponge is pictured.
Qajartalik		Quebec	2018	iii (cultural)	Qajartalik is a petroglyph site of the Dorset culture. The Dorset people inhabited the Canadian Arctic until about 1000 CE and they disappeared before the arrival of the Thule Inuit. The site contains about 180 carvings that depict human and zoomorphic faces.
Sirmilik National Park and Tallurutiup Imanga (proposed) National Marine Conservation Area	Snow-covered mountains and ice-covered sea	Nunavut	2018	v, ix (mixed)	The landscape in the high Arctic is defined by ice; however, Lancaster Sound is ice-free most of the year. The open water areas at the edge of ice packs, polynyas, provide shelter for marine mammals and birds, and have been integral for the survival of the peoples that have inhabited the area over the last three millennia.
Stein Valley	Mountains and forest	British Columbia	2018	iii, vi (cultural)	The cultural landscape of the Stein Valley is connected to the Nlakaʼpamux people and their way of life. They relied on the nature for foods, medicines, and materials. There are numerous trail networks, pictogram sites, resource-gathering locations, and sacred sites. The valley prominently features in the Nlakaʼpamux creation stories and oral traditions.
Wanuskewin	Creek covered with vegetation	Saskatchewan	2018	iii (cultural)	Opimihaw Creek (pictured) is a tributary to the South Saskatchewan River. Due to its unique topography with deep valleys in otherwise flat prairies, it has been used by the Great Plains peoples for over six millennia. The valley was used as buffalo jump, for habitation, to gather plants, and to access fresh water. There are several archaeological sites in this relatively small area.
Yukon Ice Patches		Yukon	2018	iii, v (cultural)	The ice patches in Yukon have been first discovered in 1997. They are different than glaciers as, unlike the latter, they do not move downhill. First Nations peoples were hunting caribou and sheep in the area and the ice has preserved hunting weapons and other tools from otherwise perishable materials, illustrating the technology of these nomadic hunters. The oldest tools have been dated to be about 7,500 years old.
Transatlantic Cable Ensemble (Canada)*	A building in red brick and a blue info panel in front	Newfoundland and Labrador	2022	ii, iv (cultural)	This nomination comprises the two termini of the world's first permanent transatlantic telegraph cable, which revolutionized the long-distance communication. The eastern terminus, the Valentia Transatlantic Cable Station in Ireland, was built in 1868, while the western terminus, the Heart's Content Cable Station (pictured), was finished in 1876. The sites were closed in the 1960s but still preserve a lot of intact original equipment.

== See also ==
- Tourism in Canada
- List of Biosphere Reserves in Canada
- National Historic Sites of Canada
