= Ramah, Newfoundland and Labrador =

Coordinates: 58°52′23″N 63°14′24″W

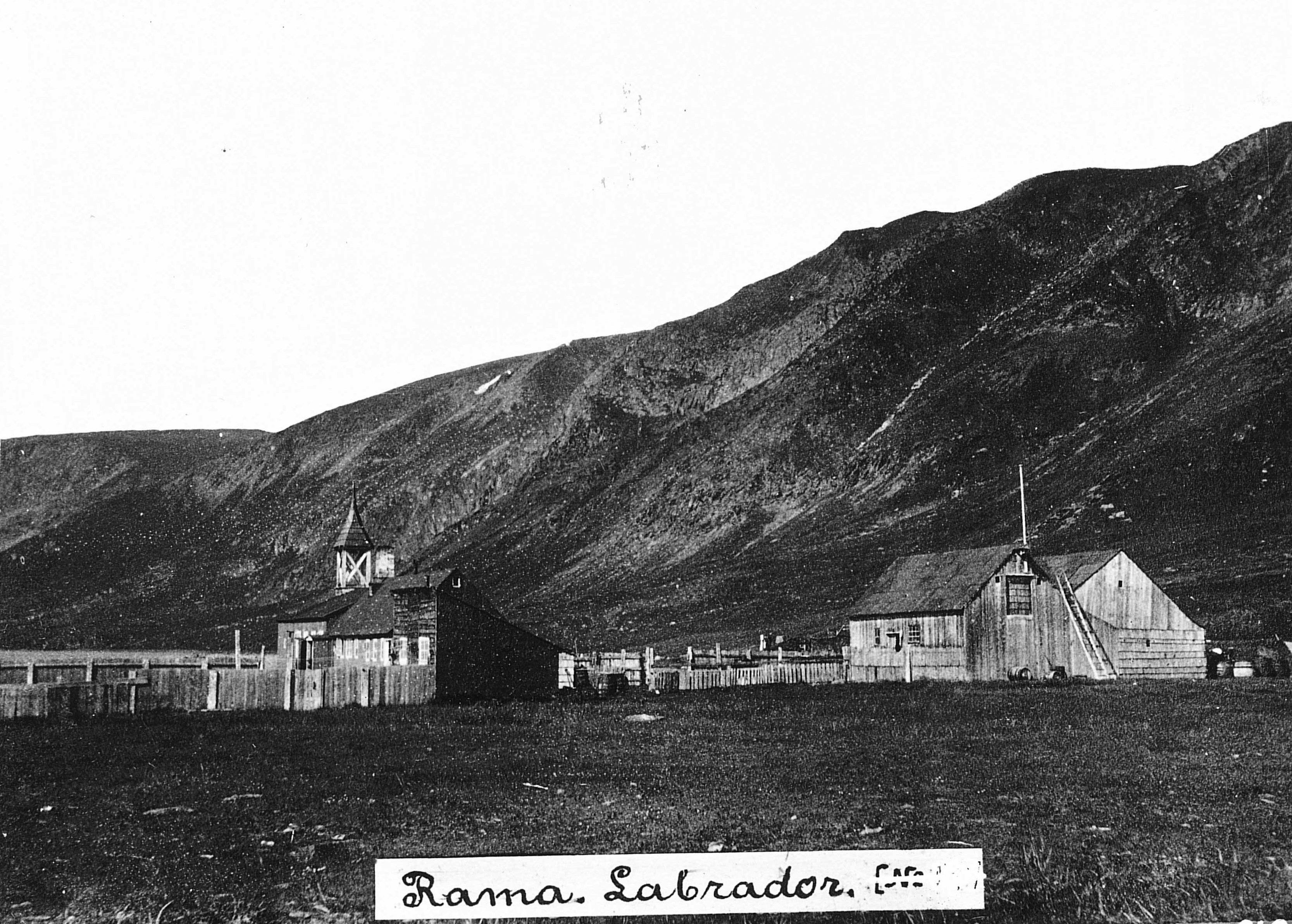
Ramah, circa 1900

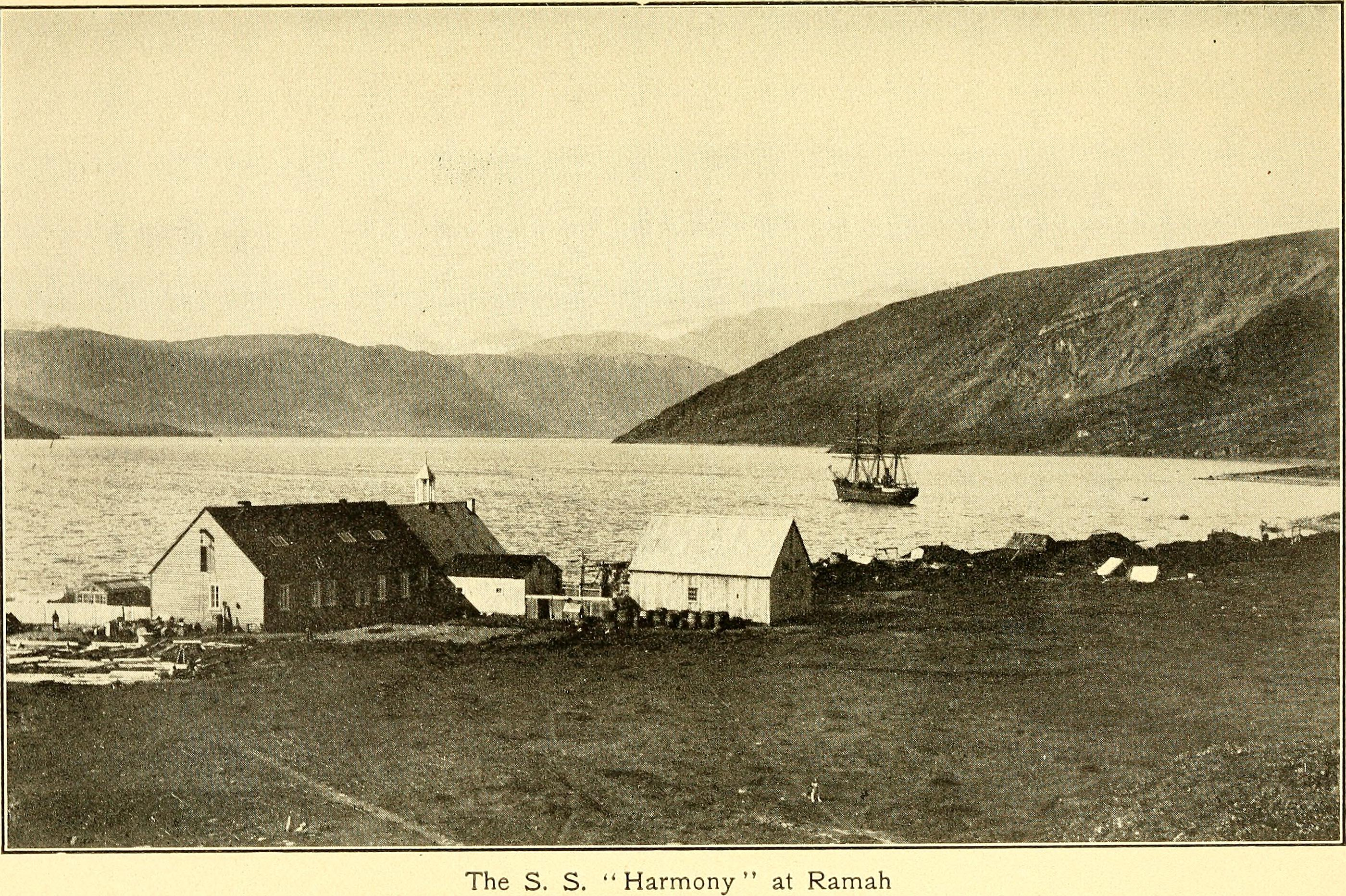
Ramah, 1909

Ramah was a small mission run by the Moravian Church in northern Labrador from 1871 until 1908. It was located on Ramah Bay.

== Ramah Chert ==
Ramah Bay is the site of an uncommon semi-translucent light-grey stone with dark banding called Ramah chert. The Ramah chert crops out in a narrow geological bed stretching from Saglek Fiord to Nachvak. At Ramah Bay the highest quality stone, for flaking chipped stone tools (mostly bifaces and projectile points), is most readily accessible. Discovered by pioneering Native American groups, which archaeologists identify as the Maritime Archaic Culture, around 7000 years ago, the stone was highly valued for its functional as well as spiritual qualities. Ramah chert was the preferred raw material for the Maritime Archaic Indians (ca. 7000 to 3500 years ago) and for succeeding populations of Dorset paleoeskimos (ca. 2200 to 800 years ago) and by the immediate ancestors of the Innu (from about 2000 years ago to contact with the Europeans in the 18th century). Ramah chert was traded as far south as New England and even Chesapeake Bay and west to the Great Lakes which is documented in a report by Stephen Loring.

== See also ==
- List of communities in Newfoundland and Labrador
