= National Historic Sites of Canada =

Heritage registers in Canada

Click on a province/territory for a list of its National Historic Sites

National Historic Sites of Canada (French: Lieux historiques nationaux du Canada) are places that have been designated by the federal Minister of the Environment on the advice of the Historic Sites and Monuments Board of Canada (HSMBC), as being of national historic significance. Parks Canada, a federal agency, manages the National Historic Sites program. Fort Anne, in Annapolis Royal, Nova Scotia, became Canada’s first administered National Historic Site in 1917. As of March 2026, there were 1,004 National Historic Sites, 171 of which are administered by Parks Canada; the remainder are administered or owned by other levels of government or private entities. The sites are located across all ten provinces and three territories, with two sites located in France (the Beaumont-Hamel Newfoundland Memorial and Canadian National Vimy Memorial).

There are related federal designations for National Historic Events and National Historic Persons. Sites, Events and Persons are each typically marked by a federal plaque of the same style, but the markers do not indicate which designation a subject has been given. For example, the Rideau Canal is a National Historic Site, while the Welland Canal is a National Historic Event.

== History ==
=== Early developments ===
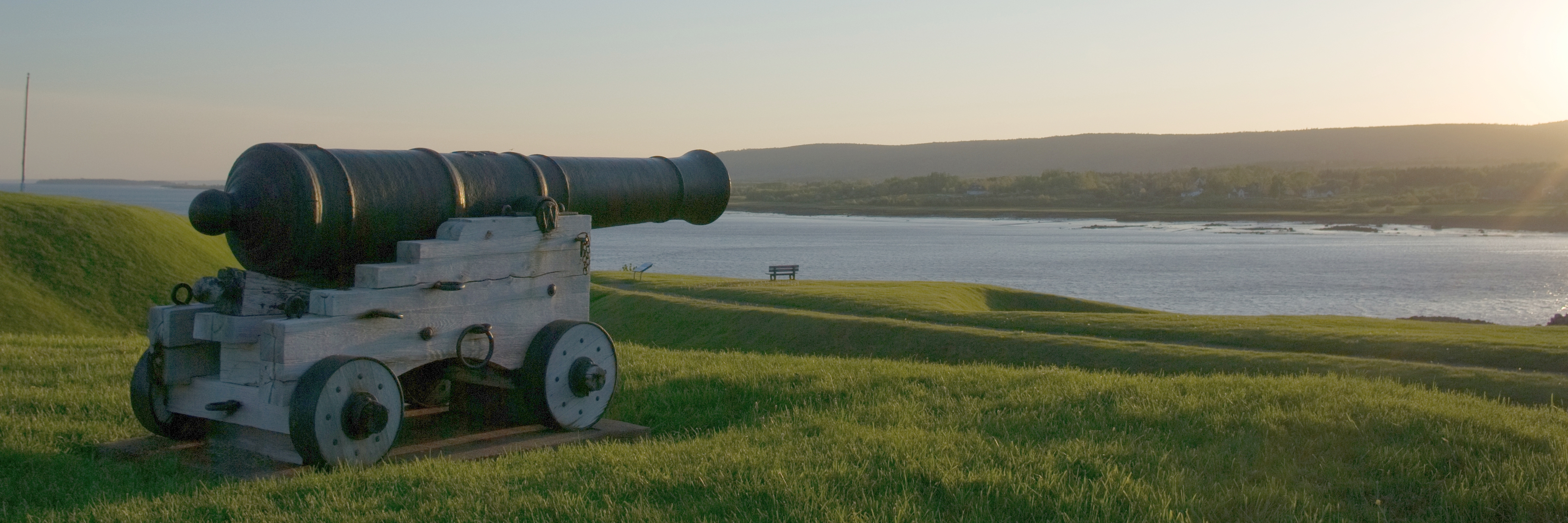
Fort Anne in Annapolis Royal, Nova Scotia, designated in 1917, is the oldest National Historic Site.

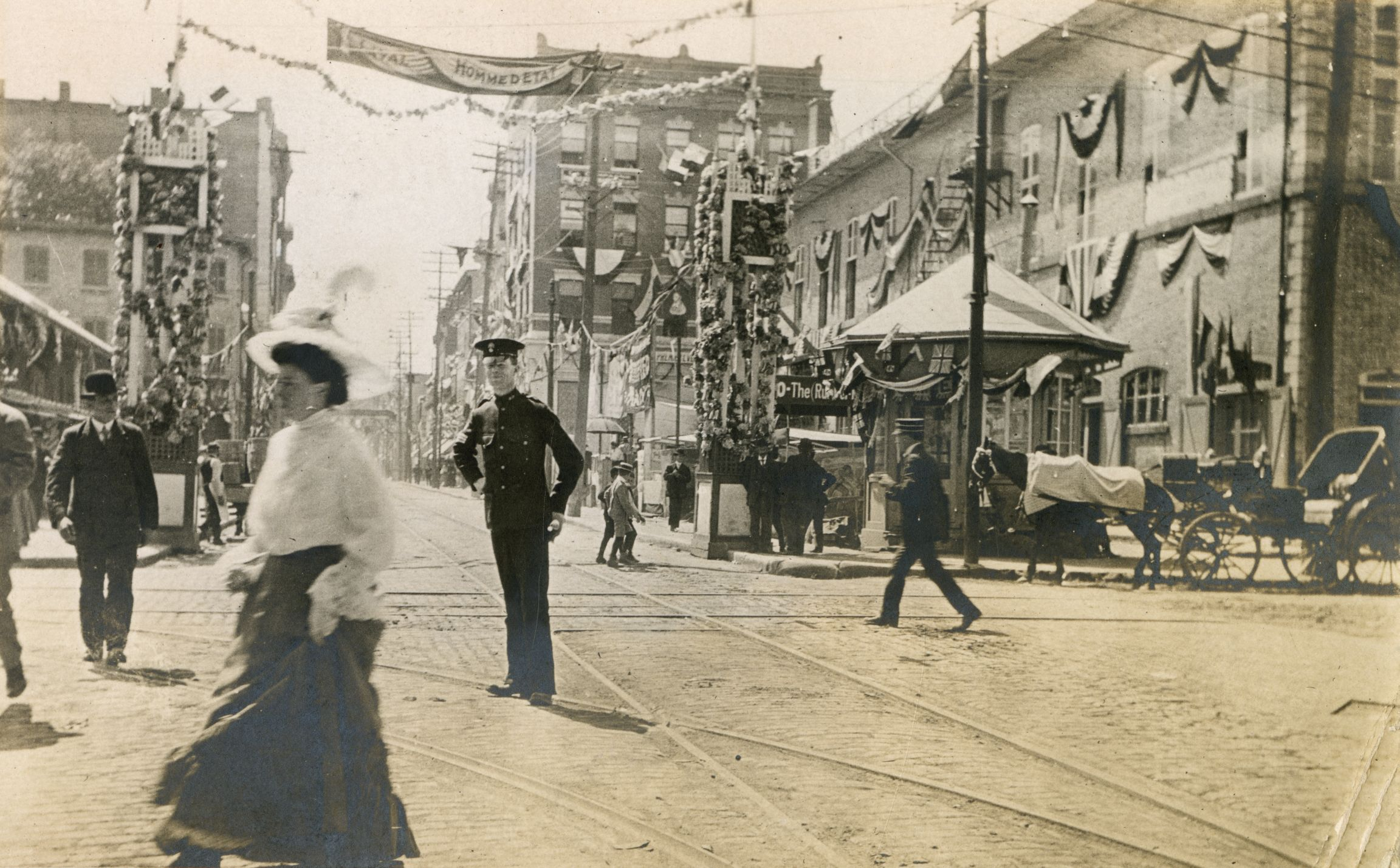
The celebrations of Quebec City's tricentennial in 1908 acted as a catalyst for federal efforts to designate and preserve historic sites.

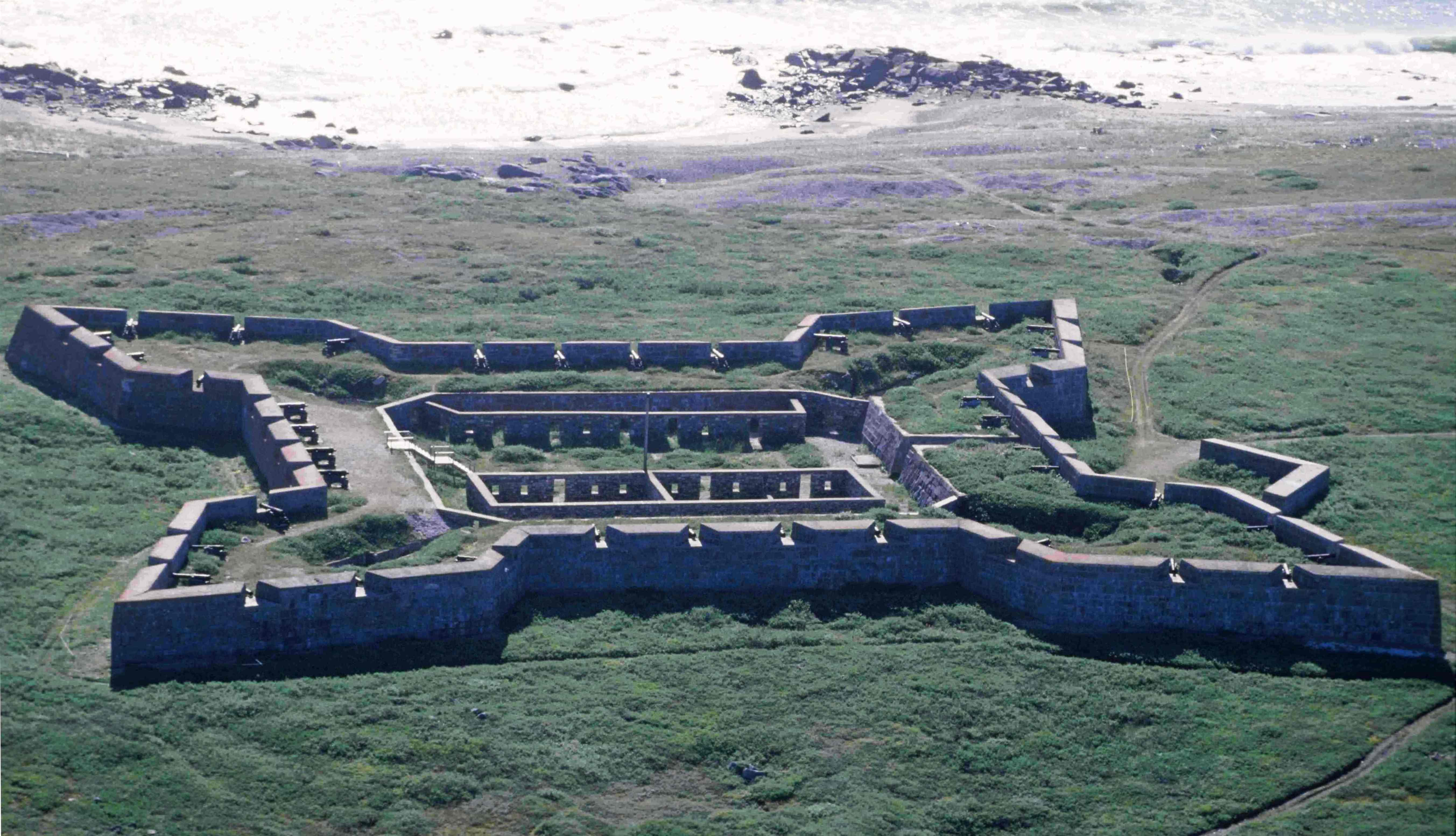
Prince of Wales Fort in Churchill, Manitoba was one of the first two sites designated in Western Canada.

Emerging Canadian nationalist sentiment in the late 19th century and early 20th century led to an increased interest in preserving Canada's historic sites. There were galvanizing precedents in other countries. With the support of notables such as Victor Hugo and Eugène Viollet-le-Duc, the Commission des monuments historique was created in France in 1837; it published its first list of designated sites, containing 934 entries, in 1840. In the United Kingdom, the National Trust for Places of Historic Interest or Natural Beauty was created in 1894 to protect that country's historic and natural heritage. While there was no National Park Service in the United States until 1916, battlefields of the Civil War were designated and managed by the War Department: Chickamauga and Chattanooga (created 1890), Antietam (1890), Shiloh (1894), Gettysburg (1895), Vicksburg (1899), and Chalmette (1907).

Domestically, Lord Dufferin, the Governor General from 1872 to 1878, initiated some of the earliest, high-profile efforts to preserve Canada's historic sites. He was instrumental in stopping the demolition of the fortifications of Quebec City, and he was the first public official to call for the creation of a park on the lands next to Niagara Falls.

The 1908 tricentennial of the founding of Quebec City, and the establishment that same year of the National Battlefields Commission to preserve the Plains of Abraham, acted as a catalyst for federal efforts to designate and preserve historic sites across Canada. At the same time, the federal government was looking for ways to extend the National Park system to Eastern Canada. The more populated east did not have the same large expanses of undeveloped Crown land that had become parks in the west, so the Dominion Parks Branch (the predecessor to Parks Canada) looked to historic features to act as focal points for new national parks. In 1914, the Parks Branch undertook a survey of historic sites in Canada, with the objective of creating new recreational areas rather than preserving historic places. Fort Howe in Saint John, New Brunswick was designated a national historic park in 1914, named the "Fort Howe National Park". The fort was not a site of significant national historic importance, but its designation provided a rationale for the acquisition of land for a park. Fort Anne in Annapolis Royal, Nova Scotia, designated in 1917, is the oldest National Historic Site in the federal system.

In 1919, William James Roche, the Minister of the Interior, was concerned over the fate of old fur trade posts in Western Canada, and he was also being lobbied by historical associations across Canada for federal funds to assist with the preservation and commemoration of local landmarks. At the same time, the Department of Militia and Defence was anxious to transfer old forts, and the associated expenses, to the Parks Branch. Roche asked James B. Harkin, the first Commissioner of Dominion Parks, to develop a departmental heritage policy. Harkin believed that the Parks Branch did not have the necessary expertise to manage historic resources; he was troubled by the relatively weak historic value of Fort Howe, the country's first historic park, and feared that the Branch's park improvements were incompatible with the heritage attributes of Fort Anne, the second historic park.

=== Historic Sites and Monuments Board of Canada ===
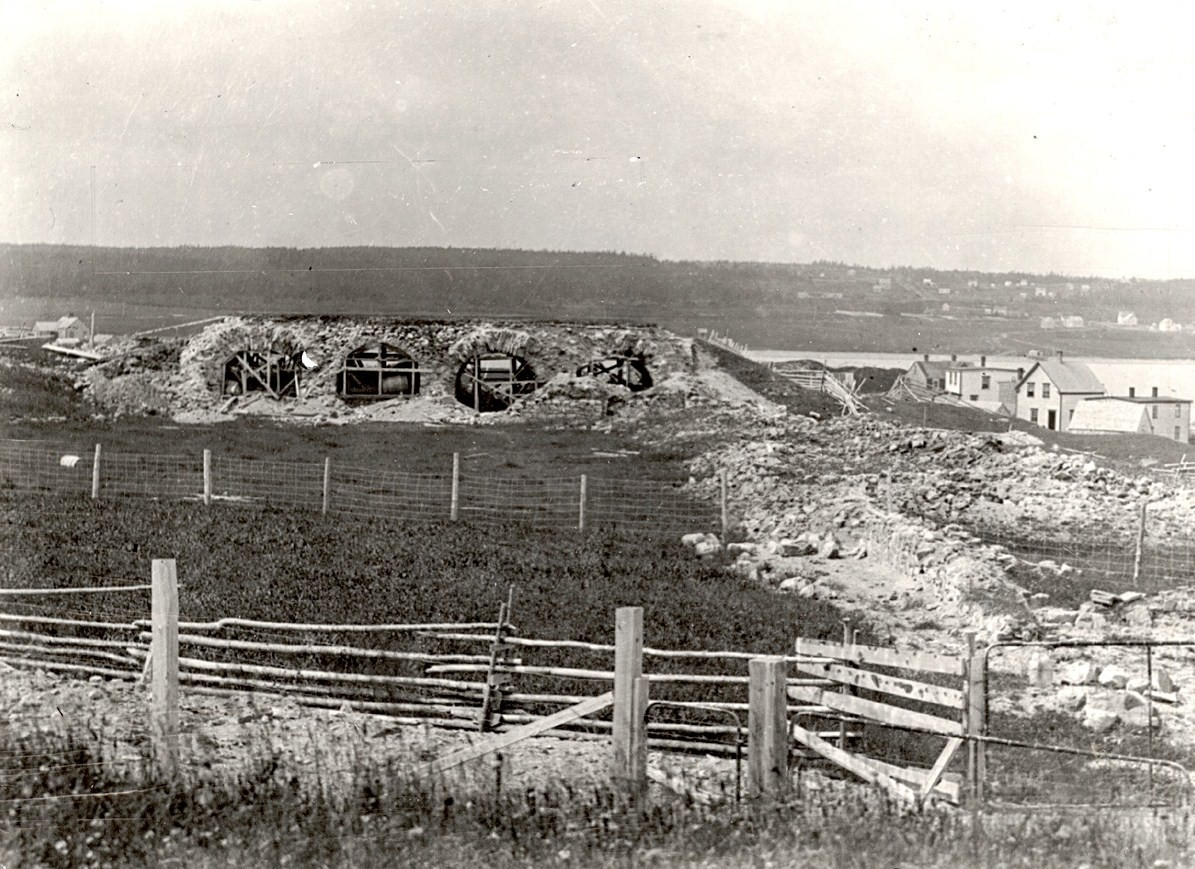
The initial focus of the program was strictly on commemoration rather than preservation or restoration. The ruins of the Fortress of Louisbourg were designated in 1920, but efforts to restore the fortress did not commence until 1961.

On Harkin's recommendation, the government created the Advisory Board for Historic Site Preservation (later called the Historic Sites and Monuments Board of Canada) in 1919 in order to advise the Minister on a new program of National Historic Sites. Brigadier General Ernest Alexander Cruikshank, a noted authority on the War of 1812 and the history of Ontario, was chosen as the Board's first chairman, a post he held for twenty years. The first place designated and plaqued under the new program was the "Cliff Site" in Port Dover, Ontario, where two priests claimed sovereignty over the Lake Erie region for Louis XIV of France in 1670.

Due to a lack of resources, the HSMBC limited itself to recommending sites for designation, and the focus of the program was on commemoration rather than on preservation. Benjamin Sulte, a member of the HSMBC, wrote to Harkin in 1919 about the significant ruins at the Forges du Saint-Maurice, demonstrating his preference for the installation of a plaque over restoration: "All that can be done in our days is to clear away the heap of stones, in order to reach the foundation walls and plant a sign in the centre of the square thus uncovered."

In the early years of the program, National Historic Sites were chosen to commemorate battles, important men, the fur trade and political events; the focus was on the "great men and events" credited with establishing the nation. Of the 285 National Historic Sites designated by 1943, 105 represented military history, 52 represented the fur trade and exploration, and 43 represented famous individuals (almost entirely men). There was also a strong bias in favour of commemorating sites in Ontario over other parts of the country. The then prominence of sites in Ontario related to the War of 1812 and the United Empire Loyalists has been attributed to the influence of Cruikshank, resulting in a "veritable palisade of historical markers along the St. Lawrence", and in Niagara, promoting a loyalist doctrine of imperial unity with Britain, while commemorating resistance to "Americanism". Proposals to designate sites related to the immigration of Jews, Blacks and Ukrainians to Canada were rejected, as were attempts to recognize patriots of the Rebellions of 1837. Such was the view of Canadian history by the Board in the first half of the 20th century. The HSMBC at the time has been described by historian Yves Yvon Pelletier as a "Victorian gentlemen's club", made up of self-taught historical scholars, whose decisions were made without public consultation and without the benefit of a secretariat to further investigate the recommendations of Board members.

=== List of members of the Historic Sites and Monuments Board of Canada ===
The following have served as members of the Historic Sites and Monuments Board of Canada:

Name	Province	Year joined	Year left	Additional
E.A Cruikshank	Ontario	1919	1939	Board Chairman 1919–1939
James Coyne	Ontario	1919	1932	
Frederic Howay	British Columbia	1923	1944	Board Chairman 1943–1944
Fred Landon	Ontario	1932	1958	Board Chairman 1950–1958
W.N. Sage	British Columbia	1944	1959	
Harry Walker	Ontario	1955	1959	
Donald Creighton	Ontario	1958	1972	
A.R.M. Lower	Ontario	1959	1961	
Margaret Ormsby	British Columbia	1960	1967	
James J. Talman	Ontario	1961	1973	
James Nesbitt	British Columbia	1967	1971	
Margaret Prang	British Columbia	1971	1979	
J.M.S Careless	Ontario	1972	1985	Board Chairman 1981–1985
B. Napier Simpson	Ontario	1973	1978	
Charles Humphries	British Columbia	1979	–	
Edward Storey	Ontario	1981	1987	
Thomas H.B Symons	Ontario	1986	–	Board Chairman 1986–
John H. White	Ontario	1988	–	

=== Evolution of the program ===
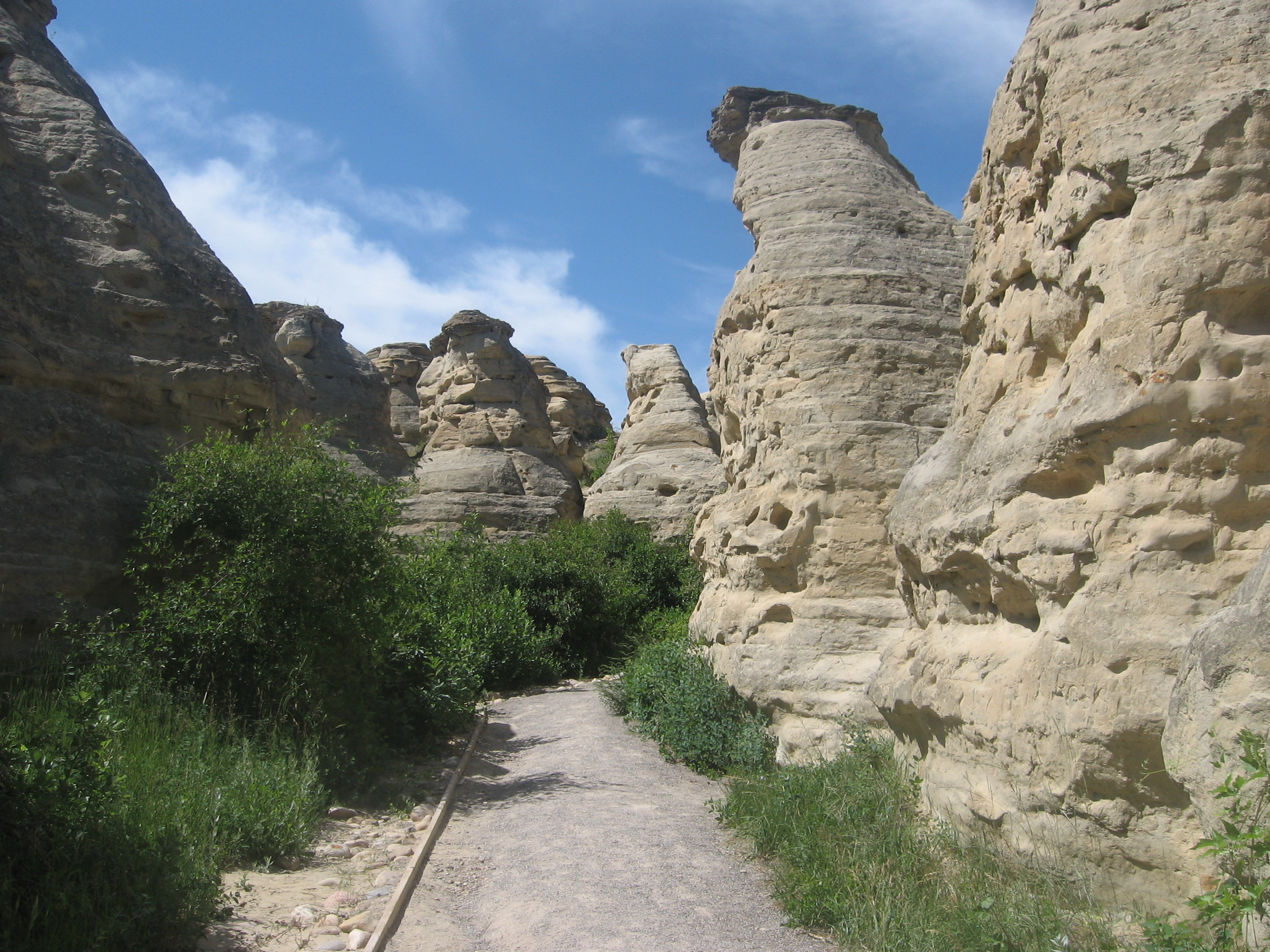
Áísínai’pi, a location of significant cultural and religious importance to the Blackfoot people, was designated in 2006.

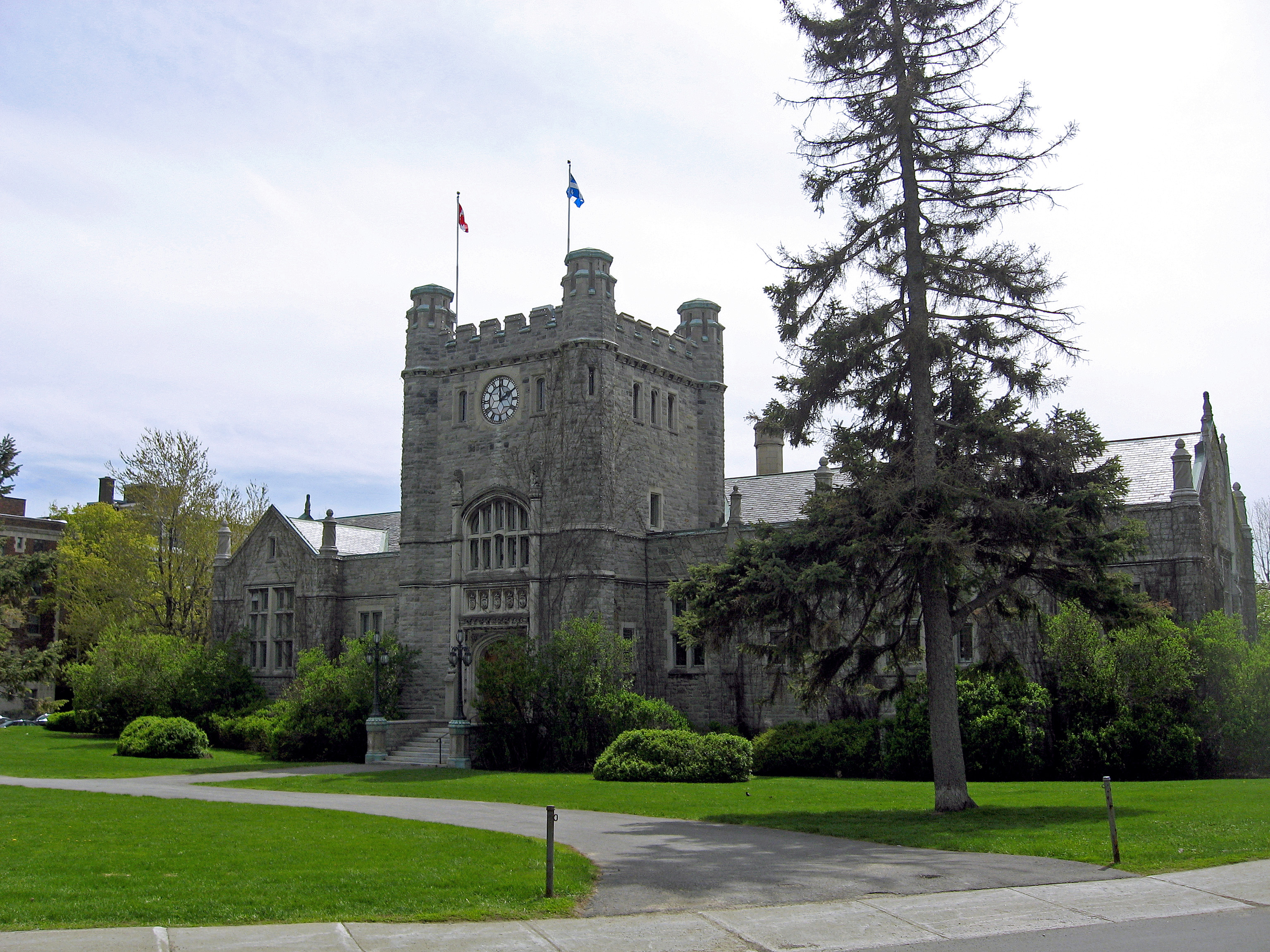
The historic district of Westmount, Quebec was designated in 2011 in recognition of the efforts of local citizens who had worked for decades to protect the district's historic built environment.

As time passed and the system grew, the scope of the program and the nature of the designations evolved. By the 1930s, the focus of the heritage movement in Canada had shifted from commemoration to preservation and development. The change was most marked in Ontario, where the Niagara Parks Commission was restoring Fort George and the Department of Highways was restoring Fort Henry. It took the Great Depression to create opportunities for significant heritage preservation projects at the federal level. Although the HSMBC took little interest in these efforts, limiting itself to a commemorative role, the Parks Branch made wide use of government relief funds to hire workers to assist with the restoration of old forts.

In 1943, the interim chairman of the HSMBC, Frederic William Howay, urged his fellow Board members to consider a broader range of designations, and to correct the geographic and thematic imbalance in the designations. In particular, Howay encouraged the HSMBC to pay more attention to economic, social and cultural history, and he urged a moratorium on additional designations related to the War of 1812. In 1951, the Royal Commission on National Development in the Arts, Letters and Sciences highlighted the imbalances of the National Historic Sites program, urging a more ambitious program with more attention paid to architectural preservation. In 1955, the Historic Sites and Monuments Act was amended to allow the designation of buildings due to their age or design, resulting in a new focus on the designation of Canada's built heritage. The 1950s also marked the beginning of the "big project" era, which reached its apogee in the 1960s, in which the federal government invested significant funds in the restoration and reconstruction of high-profile National Historic Sites such as the Halifax Citadel, the Fortress of Louisbourg, the fortifications of Quebec City and the historic core of Dawson City.

The 1970s marked the start of a new shift in the nature of the designations. Of the 473 National Historic Sites designated between 1971 and 1993, the formerly dominant category of political-military events represented only 12 percent of the new designations, with the "Battle of..."-type commemorations being overtaken by sites associated with federal politics. The largest group of designations (43 percent) pertained to historic buildings. By the 1990s, three groups were identified as being underrepresented among National Historic Sites: Aboriginal peoples, women, and ethnic groups other than the French and the English. Efforts were subsequently made to further diversify the designations accordingly. Saoyú-ʔehdacho in the Northwest Territories was designated in 1997, becoming the first National Historic Site both designated and acquired on the basis of consultation with Aboriginal peoples, and the largest National Historic Site in land area (approximately the size of Prince Edward Island). It was at this time that the use of the term "National Historic Park", then still used for the class of larger National Historic Sites operated by Parks Canada and deemed to be of "extraordinary value to Canadian history", was phased out.

Changes were not limited to new designations, as the interpretation of many existing National Historic Sites did not remain static and evolved over time. For example, the commemoration of National Historic Sites on the Prairies related to the Red River Rebellion and the North-West Rebellion has gone through at least three phases to date. In the 1920s, plaques erected at these sites trumpeted the expansion of Canada and western civilization across North America. Due to local pressures, changes at the HSMBC and evolving historiography, texts introduced in the 1950s avoided the previous triumphalist version of events, but also avoided any analysis of the causes or consequences of the events. Commencing in the 1970s, a changing approach to heritage conservation at Parks Canada, coupled with growing regionalism and a more assertive Aboriginal rights movement, led to the next generation of interpretative documents, one that included a focus on the societies which Canada's 19th-century expansion had displaced.

== Designations ==
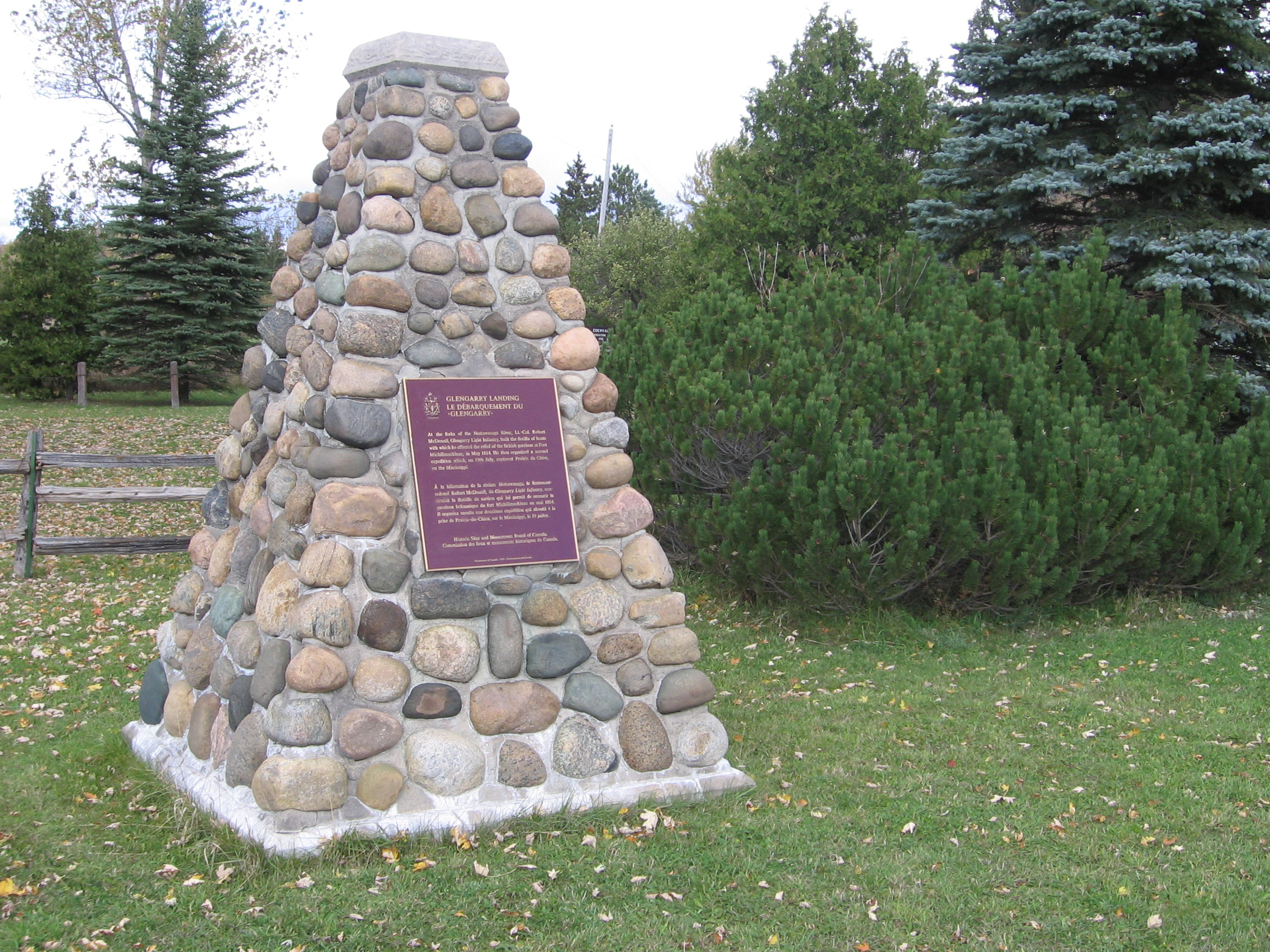
Plaques affixed to cairns were initially used to mark National Historic Sites, such as this one at Glengarry Landing in Ontario.

National Historic Sites are organized according to five broad themes: Peopling the Land, Governing Canada, Developing Economies, Building Social and Community Life, and Expressing Intellectual and Cultural Life. To be commemorated, a site must meet at least one of the following criteria:

- illustrate an exceptional creative achievement in concept and design, technology or planning, or a significant stage in the development of Canada;
- illustrate or symbolize, in whole or in part, a cultural tradition, a way of life or ideas important to the development of Canada;
- be explicitly and meaningfully associated or identified with persons who are deemed to be of national historic significance; or
- be explicitly and meaningfully associated or identified with events that are deemed to be of national historic significance.

Designation as a National Historic Site provides no legal protection for the historic elements of a site. However, historic sites may be designated at more than one level (national, provincial and municipal), and designations at other levels may carry with them some legal protections.

Most National Historic Sites are marked by a federal plaque bearing Canada's Coat of Arms. In earlier years, these plaques were erected on purpose-built cairns, and in later years have been attached to buildings or free-standing posts. These maroon and gold markers are typically in English and French, though some are trilingual where another language is relevant to the subject being commemorated.

== Lists of National Historic Sites by location ==
Sites by location		Number of sites	First site designated	Example site and designation date
Alberta sites	List of National Historic Sites of Canada in Alberta	61	1923	Frog Lake (1923)
British Columbia sites	List of National Historic Sites of Canada in British Columbia	100	1923	Rogers Pass (1971)
Manitoba sites	List of National Historic Sites of Canada in Manitoba	58	1920	Exchange District (1996)
New Brunswick sites	List of National Historic Sites of Canada in New Brunswick	63	1920	Hartland Covered Bridge (1980)
Newfoundland and Labrador sites	List of National Historic Sites of Canada in Newfoundland and Labrador	47	1951	Signal Hill (1951)
Nova Scotia sites	List of National Historic Sites of Canada in Nova Scotia	90	1920	Pier 21 (1997)
Ontario sites	List of National Historic Sites of Canada in Ontario	275	1919	McCrae House (1966)
		15	1929	Dundurn Castle (1997)
		22	1923	Kingston City Hall (1961)
		26	1921	Niagara-on-the-Lake (2003)
		26	1925	Parliament Buildings (1976)
		37	1923	Fort York (1923)
Prince Edward Island sites	List of National Historic Sites of Canada in Prince Edward Island	22	1933	L.M. Montgomery's Cavendish (2004)
Quebec sites	List of National Historic Sites of Canada in Quebec	198	1919	Île d'Orléans Seigneury (1990)
		61	1920	Notre-Dame Roman Catholic Basilica (1989)
		37	1923	Château Frontenac (1981)
Saskatchewan sites	List of National Historic Sites of Canada in Saskatchewan	49	1923	Canadian Bank of Commerce (1976)
Northwest Territories sites	List of National Historic Sites of Canada in the Northwest Territories	12	1930	Church of Our Lady of Good Hope (1977)
Nunavut sites	List of National Historic Sites of Canada in Nunavut	12	1964	Inuksuk Point (1969)
Yukon sites	List of National Historic Sites of Canada in Yukon	11	1959	Dawson Historical Complex (1959)
France	List of National Historic Sites of Canada in France	2	1996	Vimy Ridge (1996)

== See also ==
- Canadian Register of Historic Places
- National symbols of Canada
- Royal monuments in Canada
- Seven Wonders of Canada
- List of World Heritage Sites in Canada
