= Arctic ecology =

Study of the relationships between biotic and abiotic factors in the arctic

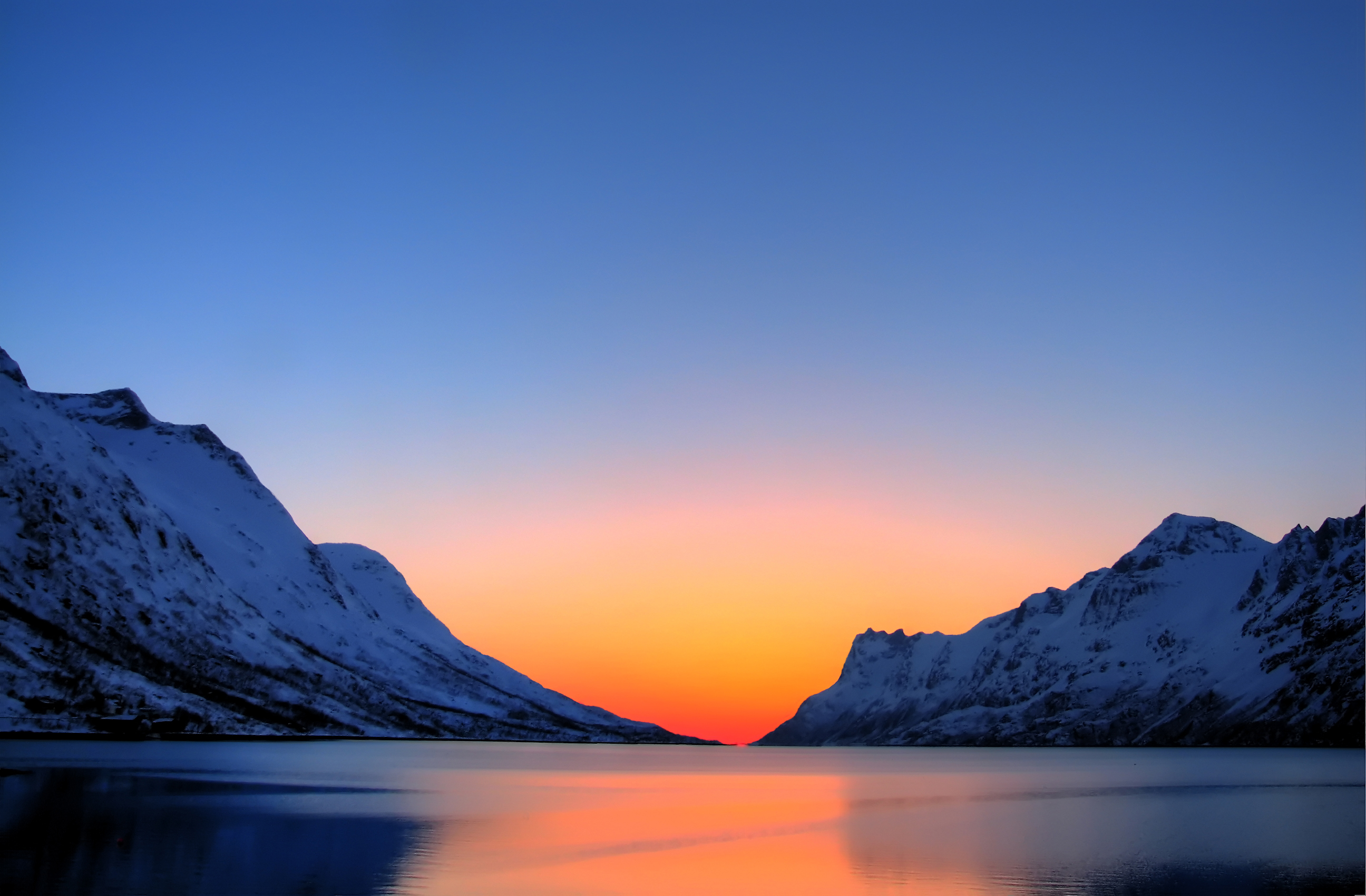
A sunset in the arctic region.

Arctic ecology is the scientific study of the relationships between biotic and abiotic factors in the arctic, the region north of the Arctic Circle (66° 33'N). This region is characterized by two biomes: taiga (or boreal forest) and tundra. While the taiga has a more moderate climate and permits a diversity of both non-vascular and vascular plants, the tundra has a limited growing season and stressful growing conditions due to intense cold, low precipitation, and a lack of sunlight throughout the winter. Sensitive ecosystems exist throughout the Arctic region, which are being impacted dramatically by global warming.

The earliest hominid inhabitants of the Arctic were the Neanderthal sub-species. Since then, many indigenous populations have inhabited the region and continue to do so to this day.

The Arctic is a valued area for ecological research. During the Cold War, the Arctic became a place where the United States, Canada, and the Soviet Union performed significant research that has been essential to the study of climate change in recent years. A major reason why research in the Arctic is valuable for the study of climate change is that the effects of climate change will be felt more quickly and more drastically at higher latitudes of the world as above average temperatures are predicted for Northwest Canada and Alaska.

== Early human history and ecology in the Arctic ==
Current evidence of woolly mammoth death due to hunting dates hominid presence in the Arctic to as early as 45,000 years ago, while other evidence has indicated hominid presence near the Arctic Circle at an even earlier time period. It has been speculated that the hunting abilities and advanced tools of these early populations could have contributed to their ability to become established in the Arctic. A subject of debate in current Arctic ecological research is whether these Arctic inhabitants belonged to the species Homo neanderthalensis, or whether they were early members of the species Homo sapiens sapiens, or modern-day humans. This debate stems from a current lack of knowledge of the processes which led to the replacement of Neanderthal populations by Homo sapiens sapiens, but there is agreement that evidence of tool-use and hunting in the Arctic suggests some form of hominid presence in this region.

About 40,000 years ago, Neanderthals were globally replaced by modern humans, Homo sapiens sapiens.

There has been evidence found of the presence of populations Homo sapiens sapiens that utilized "leaf point" tools in the Arctic region of Siberia as early as 13,000 years ago. Paleo-arctic populations of Homo sapiens sapiens occupied northern Alaska between 13,000 and 8,000 years ago, during the transition between the Pleistocene era and the Holocene era. Research has inferred from the discovery of alternate types of tool technology in the Arctic dated to a similar period that these populations "supplant[ed], amalgamat[ed] with, or acculturat[ed]" the peoples of the "northern Cordilleran tradition".

Consideration of known historical environmental change and dates of human presence has indicated a potential link between the prey population cycles caused by environmental disturbance and Paleo-arctic residence in Arctic habitats. Mann et al. suggest that the resulting dependence of Paleo-arctic hunters on disturbance, along with the spreading of inhospitable habitats (tussock-tundra) and pests such as mosquitoes, could have resulted in the decrease of Paleo-arctic populations in Arctic regions following the end of the Pleistocene. There is still uncertainty related to determining the presence or absence of specific Arctic groups during this period.

Paleo-Eskimos followed the Paleo-arctic populations between 5,000 and 6,000 years ago, and research has suggested that they were a more widespread and lingering population with an ancestral relationship to modern-day indigenous Arctic inhabitants. Genetic evidence has given rise to the theory that the Paleo-Eskimos were a singular people which resided in Alaska, Canada, and Greenland and subsisted by hunting large terrestrial mammals and seals. Research also suggests shared genetic and cultural ancestry between this group and more Southern indigenous peoples.

Dating back to a similar time period as the Paleo-Eskimos, evidence has been found of the Arctic Small Tool tradition (ASTt) culture. This culture is a conceptual linkage between the similar tool-usage of multiple Arctic cultures, including Saqqaq and Pre-Dorset peoples. The Arctic Small Tool tradition was directly ancestral to the Dorset culture, which occupied the North American Arctic from 2700 to 1200 years ago.

The migration of the early Inuit (Thule) peoples to the Arctic replaced Paleo-Eskimo populations from 700 to 800 years ago. The use of the term 'Thule' to describe these peoples has been debated due to its "unrelated" use by the Nazi party. The Thule peoples likely descended from Arctic Small Tool tradition and Dorset populations and are known to have given rise modern-day Inuit, one indigenous group currently residing in the North-American Arctic. According to a University of Lapland publication, the Inuit are one of "over 40 different ethnic groups living in the Arctic".

The rapid cooling the earliest inhabitants felt signaled an early onset of the Little Ice Age of the 1300s. This caused the sea ice to expand, which made traveling through Greenland and Iceland impossible to manage, trapped the people in their homes and settlements, and caused trade come to a stop.

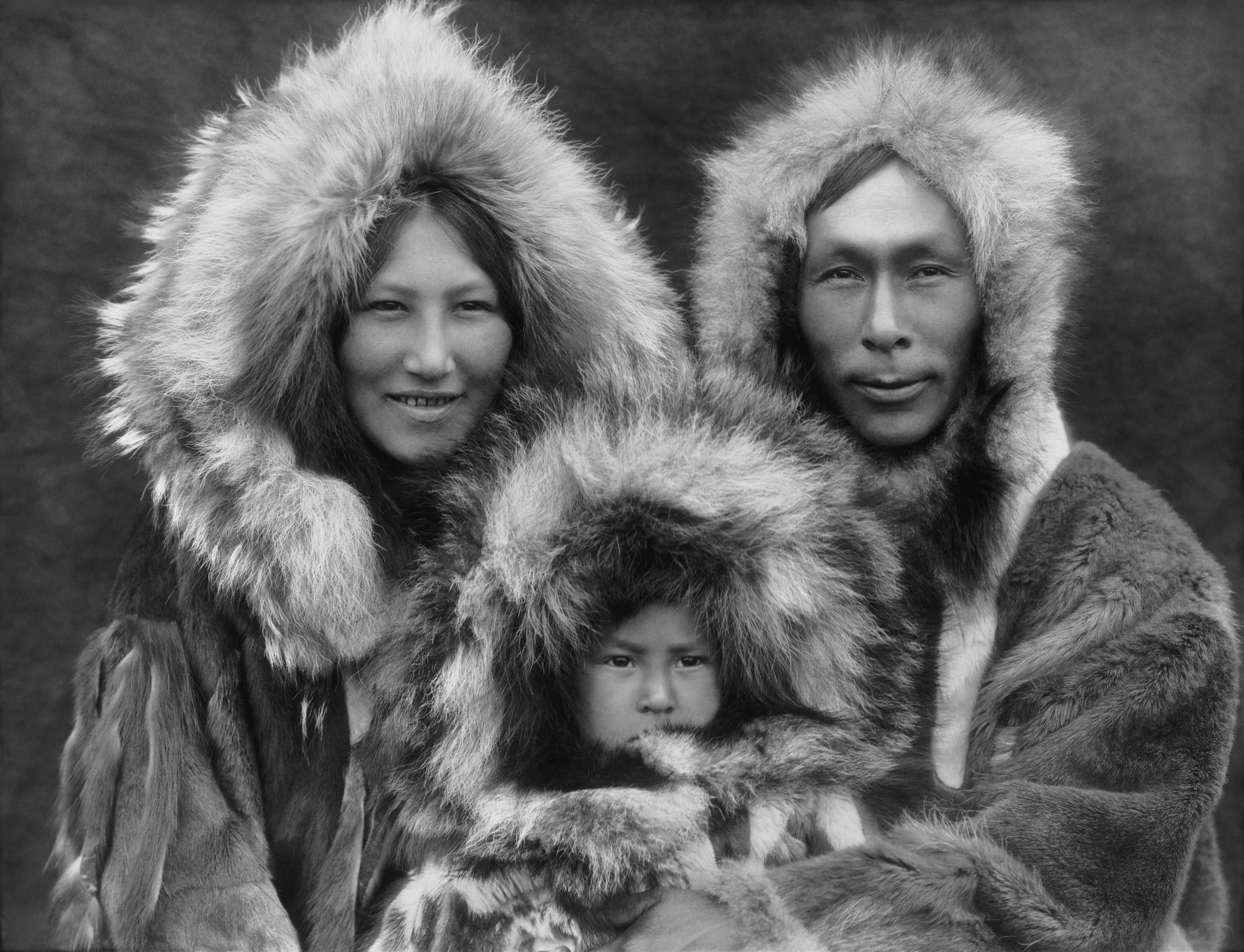
Inuit are among the indigenous inhabitants of the Arctic.

In the late eighteenth and early nineteenth centuries, as European trade interests among the North West Company and the Hudson's Bay Company expanded into northern Canada, Arctic indigenous peoples began to become more involved in the trade process. Increasing numbers of European goods, including kettles, iron tools, tobacco, alcohol, and guns, were bought and traded by the indigenous peoples within their communities. Indigenous societies in the early eighteenth century also began to buy guns from European traders; these guns increased hunting efficiency and led to a scarcity of resources in the region, a version of what American human ecologist Garrett Hardin called "the tragedy of the commons."

The lifestyles of indigenous Arctic populations reflect simultaneously spiritual and scientific understandings of their environments.

== Arctic environment ==
Both the terrestrial and oceanic aspects of the Arctic region influence Arctic ecology. Two influential environmental factors are sea ice and permafrost.

Arctic sea ice.

Sea ice is frozen seawater that moves with oceanic currents. It is a common habitat and resting place for animals, particularly during the winter months. Over time, small pockets of seawater get trapped in the ice, and the salt is squeezed out. This causes the ice to become progressively less salty. Sea ice persists throughout the year, but there is less ice available during summer months.

Large portions of the land are also frozen during the year. Permafrost is substrate that has been frozen for a minimum of 2 years. There are two types of permafrost: discontinuous and continuous. Discontinuous permafrost is found in areas where the mean annual air temperature is only slightly below freezing (0 °C or 32 °F); this forms in sheltered locations. In areas where the mean annual soil surface temperature is below −5 °C (23 °F), continuous permafrost forms. This is not limited to sheltered areas and ranges from a few inches below the surface to over 300 m (1,000 ft) deep. The top layer is called the active layer. It thaws in the summer and is critical to plant life.

== Biomes ==
Moisture and temperature are major physical drivers of natural ecosystems. The more arid and colder conditions found at higher northern latitudes (and high elevations elsewhere) support tundra and boreal forests. The water in this region is generally frozen and evaporation rates are very low. Species diversity, nutrient availability, precipitation, and average temperatures increase as the landscape progresses from the tundra to boreal forests and then to deciduous temperate ecosystems, which are found south of the Arctic biomes.

=== Tundra ===
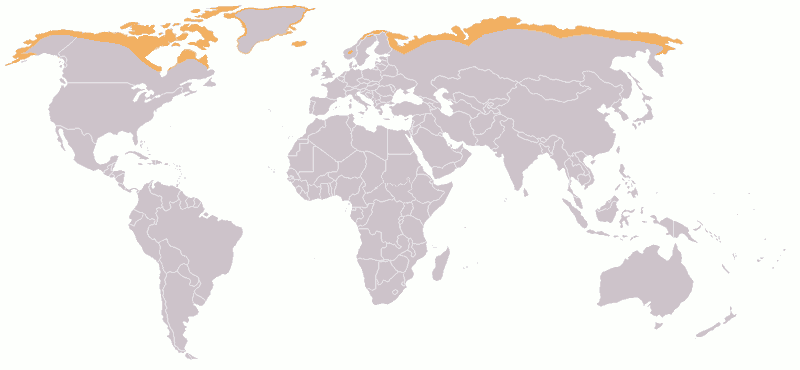
Geographical locations where the tundra biome is found.

Tundra is found north of 70° N latitude in North America, Eurasia and Greenland. It can be found at lower latitudes at high elevations as well. The average temperature is −34 °C (−29 °F); during the summer it is less than 10 °C (50 °F). Average precipitation ranges from 20 to 30 cm (8 to 12 in), and the permafrost can be "several hundred meters" thick. Plant species supported by tundra are generally short, lacking stems due to threats posed to vascular structure by frozen temperatures, and much of their growing matter is found below the soil. They are composed mainly of perennial forbs, dwarf shrubs, grasses, lichens, and mosses.

=== Boreal ===
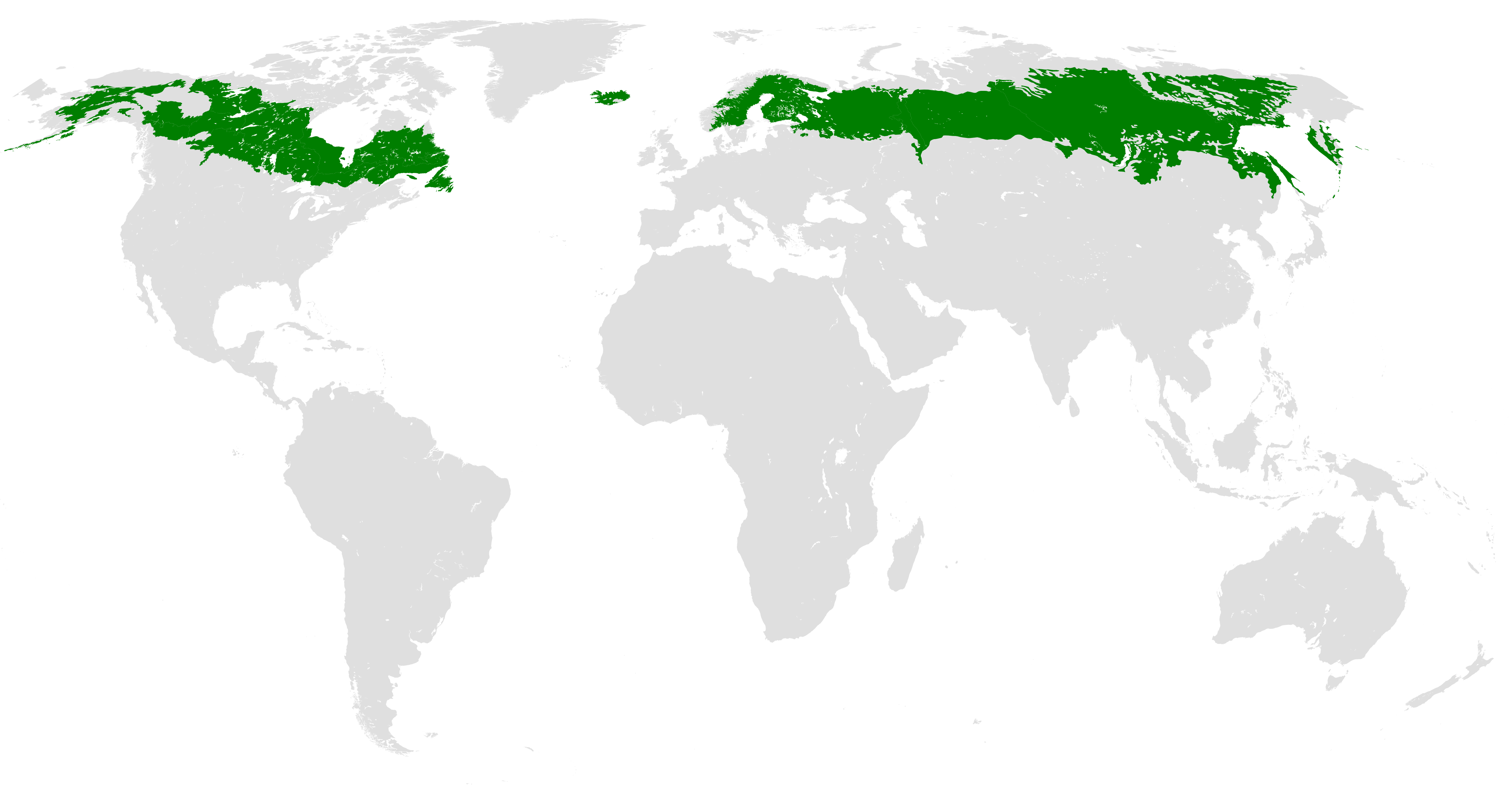
Geographical locations where the taiga biome is found.

Compared to the tundra, boreal forest has a longer and warmer growing season and supports increased species diversity, canopy height, vegetation density, and biomass. Unlike the tundra, which is characterized by a lack of trees and tall vegetation, boreal forests support a number of different tree species. Boreal conditions can be found across northern North America, Europe and Eurasia. The boreal forests in the interior of the continents grow on top of permafrost due to very cold winters (see drunken trees), though much of the boreal forest biome has patchy permafrost or lacks permafrost completely. The short (3–4 month) growing season in boreal forests is sustained by greater levels of rainfall than the tundra receives (between 30 and 85 cm or 12 and 33 in per year). This biome is dominated by closed canopy forests of evergreen conifers, especially spruces, fir, pine and tamarack with some diffuse-porous hardwoods. Shrubs, herbs, ferns, mosses, and lichens are also important species. Stand-replacing crown fires have been indicated to be important to this biome, though other research suggests that stand-replacing crown fires may be more harmful to forest biodiversity than ground fires. Recent research demonstrates that alterations in the frequency of fires and droughts in this region due to climate change may be potentially damaging to biodiversity.

=== Sea ice ===
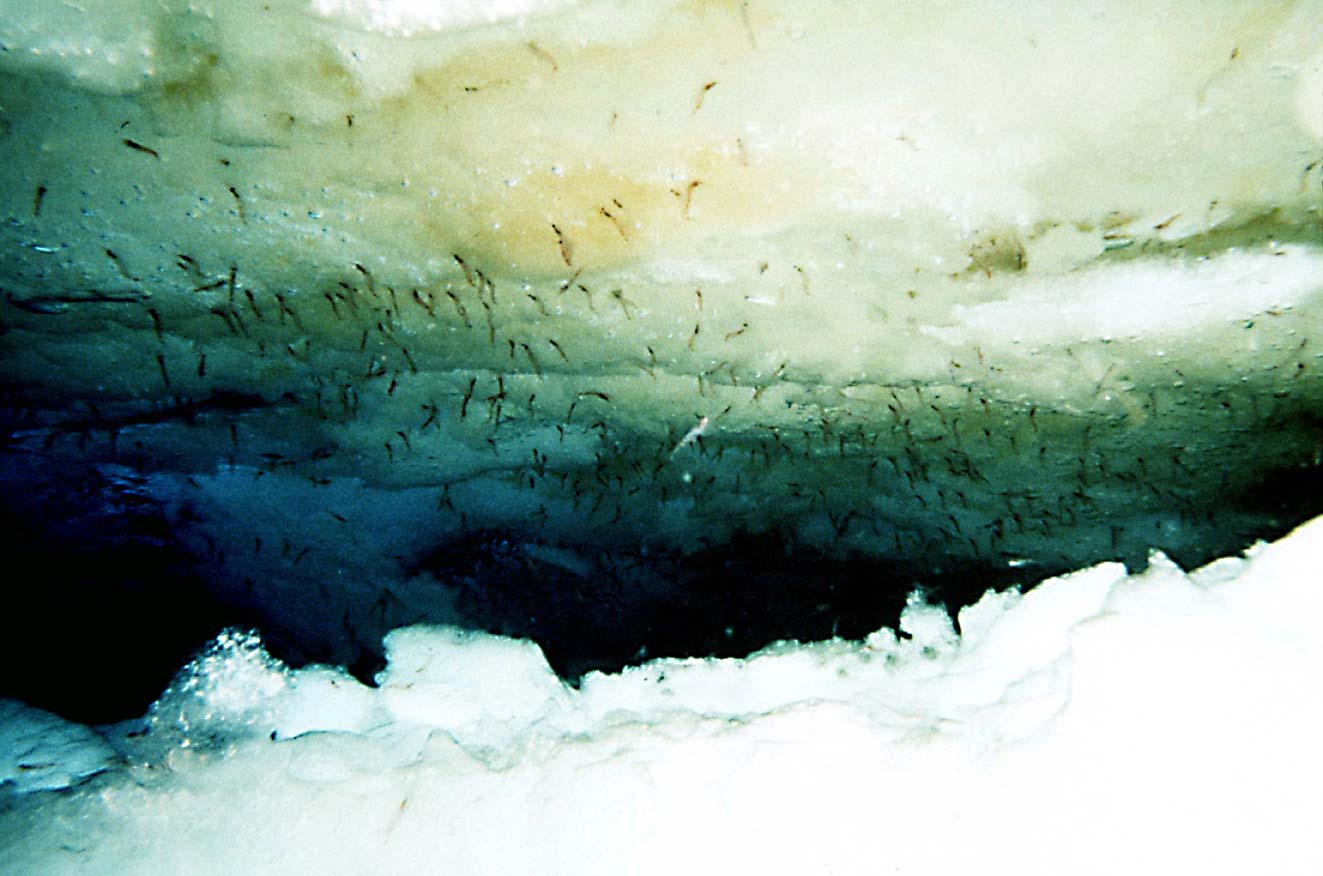
ROV image of krill grazing under the ice. In this image most krill swim in an upside down position directly under the ice. Only one animal (in the middle) is hovering in the open water.

A sympagic environment is one where water exists mostly as a solid, ice, such as a polar ice cap or glacier. Solid sea ice is permeated with channels filled with salty brine. These briny channels and the sea ice itself have its ecology, referred to as "sympagic ecology".

Residents of temperate or tropical climates often assume, mistakenly, that ice and snow are devoid of life. In fact, a number of varieties of algae such as diatoms engage in photosynthesis in arctic and alpine regions of Earth. Other energy sources include Aeolian dust and pollen swept in from other regions. These ecosystems also include bacteria and fungi, as well as animals like flatworms and crustaceans. A number of sympagic worm species are commonly called ice worms.

Additionally, the ocean has abundant plankton, and prolific algal blooms occur in the polar regions each summer as well as in high mountain lakes, bringing nutrients to those parts of the ice in contact with the water. In the Arctic Ocean, ice algae accounts for close to half of the primary production during the summer months. In the spring, krill can scrape off the green lawn of ice algae from the underside of the pack ice.

== Adaptations to conditions ==
=== Humans ===
Humans living in the Arctic region rely on acclimatization along with physical, metabolic, and behavioral adaptations to tolerate the extreme cold in the Arctic. There is evidence that modern Inuit populations have a high prevalence of specific genes that code for fat to aid in thermal regulation and that Arctic indigenous populations have significantly higher basal metabolic rates (BMRs) than non-indigenous populations. BMR is defined as "the rate of oxygen uptake at rest in the fasting and thermo-neutral state" by W.P.T. James. Research by Keestra et al. has also suggested a link between adaptations to cold climates and mitochondrial responses to thyroid hormones which "enhance" "metabolic heat production".

=== Other animals ===
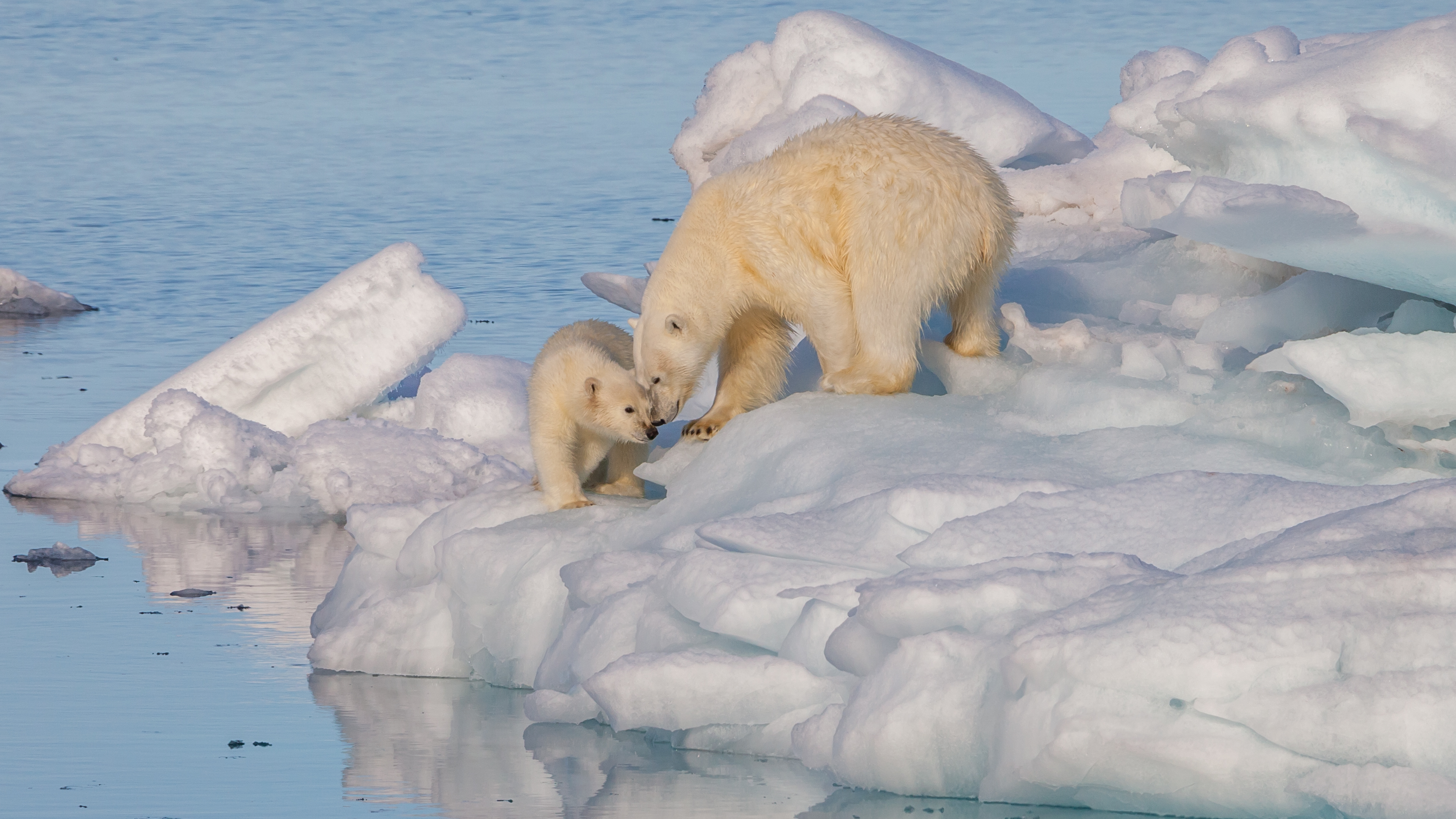
A polar bear and its cub.

Animals that are active in the winter have adaptations for surviving the intense cold. A common example is the presence of strikingly large feet in proportion to body weight. These act like snowshoes and can be found on animals like the snowshoe hare and caribou. Many of the animals in the Arctic are larger than their temperate counterparts (Bergmann's rule), taking advantage of the smaller ratio of surface area to volume that comes with increasing size. This increases their ability to conserve heat. Layers of fat, plumage, and fur also act as insulators to help retain warmth and are common in Arctic animals including polar bears and marine mammals. Some animals also have digestive adaptations to improve their ability to digest woody plants either with or without the aid of microbial organisms. This is highly advantageous during the winter months when most soft vegetation is beneath the snow pack.

Not all Arctic animals directly face the rigors of winter. Many migrate to warmer climates at lower latitudes, while others avoid the difficulties of winter by hibernating until spring.

=== Plants ===
One problem that Arctic plants face is ice crystal formation in the cells, which results in tissue death. Plants have two ways to cope with the risk of freezing: avoid it or tolerate it. Plants have several avoidance mechanisms to prevent freezing. They can build up insulation, have their stems close to the ground, use the insulation from snow cover, and supercool. When supercooling, water is able to remain in its liquid state down to −38 °C or −36 °F (compared to its usual 0 °C or 32 °F freezing point). After water reaches −38 °C (−36 °F), it spontaneously freezes and plant tissue is destroyed. This is called the nucleation point. The nucleation point can be lowered if dissolved solutes are present.

Alternatively, plants have several different ways to tolerate freezing instead of avoiding it. Some plants allow freezing by allowing extracellular, but not intracellular freezing. Plants let water freeze in extracellular spaces, which creates a high vapor deficit that pulls water vapor out of the cell. This process dehydrates the cell and allows it to survive temperatures well below −38 °C (−36 °F).

Another problem associated with extreme cold is cavitation. Ring-porous wood is susceptible to cavitation because the large pores that are used for water transport easily freeze. Cavitation is much less of problem in trees with ring-diffuse wood. In ring-diffuse wood, there is a reduced risk of cavitation, as transport pores are smaller. The trade-off is that these species are not able to transport water as efficiently.

== Effects of climate change on Arctic ecology ==
An increase in temperature due to worldwide climate change has been observed to be greater in the Arctic than the "global average," with Arctic air temperatures warming twice as quickly. The observation of the proportionally greater temperature increase in the Arctic has been termed "Arctic amplification". Arctic amplification of climate change has impacted Arctic ecology by melting sea ice, decreasing the salinity of Arctic waters, altering ocean currents and water temperatures, and increasing precipitation, all of which could potentially lead to a disruption of thermohaline circulation. Furthermore, changes in the Arctic climate could disrupt ecosystem processes and thus threaten marine biodiversity and the biodiversity of terrestrial species that depend on marine ecosystems. There has been additional evidence found which further demonstrates that Arctic climate change directly impacts terrestrial ecosystems by melting permafrost, which contributes to carbon emissions.

Global thermohaline circulation.

Thermohaline circulation is a series of underwater oceanic currents fueled by the salinity and temperature of seawater. Melting ice sheets could introduce vast amounts of fresh water into the North Atlantic, causing a change in density which could disrupt these currents, though differing projections have suggested that the melting of sea ice and warming of ocean waters could also have the opposite result and lead to stronger thermohaline currents, or maintain them. Due to the dependence of global climates on thermohaline circulation, changes in this circulation could have significant effects on temperature and precipitation.

The melting of sea ice further disrupts the lives and ecological interactions of a wide range of species, including polar bears, Arctic foxes, and multiple species of seals and sea birds. This disruption can be caused by many factors, including but not limited to these species' use of sea ice for various behaviors including migration, hunting, and mating. Reduced sea ice could further disrupt Arctic ecological interactions by altering available nutrients for phytoplankton growth and thus threatening the "foundation" of the Arctic marine tropic web. Recent projections suggest that global warming could lead to the disappearance of most Arctic summer sea ice by 2050.

Degradation of the permafrost is leading to major ground surface subsidence and pounding. As the ground is melting away in many regions of the Arctic, the locations of towns and communities that have been inhabited for centuries are now in jeopardy. A condition known as drunken tree syndrome is being caused by this melting, along with more widespread impacts on soil characteristics and plant community composition that threaten to alter current ecological relationships. Groundwater and river runoffs are being negatively impacted as well due to the release of hazardous chemicals and wastes stored in permafrost and the damage done to human infrastructure by permafrost instability. Research by Miner et al. has suggested that increased pollution caused by thawing permafrost may "disrupt" Arctic ecological stability.

Although warming conditions might increase CO_{2} uptake for photosynthetic organisms in some places, scientists are concerned that melting permafrost will also release large amounts of carbon that was previously locked in permafrost. Higher temperatures increase soil decomposition, and if soil decomposition becomes higher than net primary production, global atmospheric carbon dioxide will in turn increase. Atmospheric sinks in the water table are also being reduced as the permafrost melts and decreases the height of the water table in the Arctic.

The impacts of the release of carbon from the permafrost could be amplified by high levels of deforestation in the Boreal forests in Eurasia and Canada.

Human activity has led to the introduction of non-indigenous species (NIS) into Arctic ecosystems, while changing climate conditions have allowed their survival. Shipping has been suggested as the most significant cause of NIS introduction, and there are concerns that melting sea ice will allow increased movement of ships through Arctic waters. These NIS introductions have been labeled a major threat to global biodiversity. The climate change-induced habitat and condition alterations in the Arctic have also threatened many different species, including birds that utilize the East Asian flyway, a common migratory route. Arctic marine biodiversity is additionally threatened by anthropogenic environmental disruptions. Furthermore, climate change may alter the efficiency of ecosystem services performed by Arctic ecosystems.

The Arctic has historically been deemed a low risk region for NIS invasion due to its harsh conditions, limited food sources, and limited access, which in turn resulted in low chances of survival and growth for the NIS. However, due to the recent increases in the amount of human development paired with the melting of the ice due to climate change, the Arctic has been experiencing a more temperate climate. This has led to a higher survival rate for Southern species or NIS since the conditions have become more survivable for these species. In the long-term, the natural ecosystem and food webs are devastated since there are new causes of resource and land depletion.

Long-term mitigation strategies need to be implemented to help monitor the species richness in areas such as the Arctic to understand the trends in biodiversity and how different local strategies that have been implemented either benefit or harm the ecosystem. One example of a mitigation strategy that is potentially beneficial in the protection of local biodiversity by the reduction of NIS transport is antifouling. Antifouling technologies involve specialized paints being applied to a ship's hull to slow marine growth on the underwater area. These paints incorporate different biocides such as lead and copper and can help prevent settlement of different NIS on vehicles that transport goods to Arctic regions. This process indirectly lowers the amount of NIS transferred to the Arctic by humans, but antifouling does introduce potentially harmful chemicals into the marine environment, which is why the use, quantity, and location of the biocides must be thoroughly considered and mitigated. Current scientific and environmental thought leans towards developing and using antifouling strategies that do not involve biocides. Arctic biodiversity loss and ways to mitigate it cannot be overly generalized because Arctic species interact with varying regional conditions that strongly impact how they react to climate change.

== History of Arctic ecological exploration ==
=== Early Arctic exploration ===
In the late eighteenth and early nineteenth centuries, English scientist William Scoresby explored the Arctic and wrote reports on its meteorology, zoology and geophysics. Around this time, the Arctic region was becoming a major subject of imperial science. Though permanent observatories were not yet established, traveling scientists began to gather magnetic data in the Arctic in the early nineteenth century. In June 1831, Sir James Ross and a group of Arctic indigenous people explored the Booth Peninsula in order to determine the exact location of the Magnetic North Pole. In the European Arctic, however, Scandinavian powers collected most of the scientific data as a result of early colonies established by Norsemen in Iceland and Greenland. Scientific expeditions to the Arctic started to occur more frequently by the middle of the nineteenth century. From 1838 to 1840, French La Recherche went on an expedition to the North Atlantic with a team of French, Danish, Norwegian and Swedish scientists. Between 1856 and 1914, the Swedes conducted about twenty-five expeditions to the Arctic island of Spitsbergen in Norway. As the Swedes expanded their influence in Spitsbergen, they used the area for economic as well as scientific purposes through mining and resource extraction. During this time, the United States, Russia, Great Britain, Austria, Switzerland, Norway, and Germany also started to become more active in Spitsbergen.

=== Modern history ===
In 1946, The Arctic Research Laboratory was established under the contract of the Office of Naval Research in Point Barrow, Alaska for the purpose of investigating the physical and biological phenomena unique to the Arctic. Scientists performed fieldwork to collect data that linked new observations to prior widely accepted knowledge. Through the processes of soil sampling, surveying and photographing landscapes and distributing salmon tags, scientists demonstrated the significance of historical case studies in the study of environmental science. The ability to compare past and present data allowed scientists to understand the causes and effects of ecological changes. Around this time, geographers from McGill University were developing new methods of studying geography in the North. As laboratory research was beginning to be preferred over field research, McGill geographers implemented use of aviation in research, helping knowledge production to occur in the laboratory instead of in the field. Aviation allowed researchers to remodel the way they studied the Northern landscape and indigenous people. Ease of travel by aircraft also promoted an integration of the Northern science with Southern community-based science while changing the scale of ecology being studied. The ability to photograph and observe the Arctic from an aircraft provided researchers with a perspective that allowed them to see a massive amount of space at one time while also asserting objectivity. Furthermore, photographs could be understood, circulated and accepted by non-scientific groups.

During the Cold War, the Canadian government began taking initiatives to secure the continent, and to assert territorial authority over northern Canada, including the Arctic, which at the time had a dominant American presence. The Canadian government required permission from other nations to utilize their land for military initiatives; furthermore, they supported and implemented civilian initiatives including resource development and wildlife conservation. Furthermore, both the United States and the Soviet Union sought to gain control over portions of the Arctic as part of their conflict during this time, a process which included the construction of research stations.

In 1950's, ecologist Charles Elton was drawn to the Arctic to study the existence, causes and effects of cycles in animal populations, while ecologists Frank Banfield and John Kelsal studied the factors, especially human impacts, influencing hunting and game populations on animals such as caribou. The 1960s and 1970s brought a decrease in the desire to protect the Arctic as it was seen to lack a significant amount of biodiversity, and scientists extended further research into the area without the limitations that such protection may have entailed. In June 1960, the Cold Regions Research and Engineering Laboratory (CRREL) was constructed, headed by General Duncan Hallock and the U.S. Army Corps of Engineers. The two predecessor organizations that made up the CRREL were the Arctic Construction and Frost Effects Laboratory (ACFEL) and the Snow, Ice and Permafrost Research Establishment (SIPRE). The goal of the CREEL laboratory was to bring together the ACFEL and SIPRE to expand the size and scientific reputation of these organizations, solve problems in cold regions and explore the basic environmental characteristics of cold regions.

=== Indigenous peoples and research ===
As research in the Arctic region of northern North America became more frequent, interactions between researchers and indigenous peoples occurred, often with harmful impacts on the indigenous communities. Recently, the indigenous communities of the North American Arctic have played a direct role in setting ethical standards for research in the region. Indigenous communities voiced their concern that Arctic research could lead to undesirable changes to the region's landscape and economy, and Canadian officials responded to their concerns by addressing the responsibility of scientists to consult with indigenous communities before conducting research. In 1977, the Association of Canadian Universities for Northern Studies (ACUNS) was founded at Churchill, Manitoba to improve scientific activity in the region. ACUNS published a document aimed at promoting cooperation between the northern indigenous people and researchers called Ethical Principles for the Conduct of Research in the North (1982). The document was published in English, French, and Inuktitut so that it could be understood by the involved parties. Activists from indigenous Arctic communities are involved in determining the direction of current Arctic climate change research. Multiple researchers emphasize the value of collaborating with and respecting indigenous populations in order to promote constructive as opposed to destructive interactions.

== See also ==
- Bibliography of the human history of the Arctic
- Bibliography of the scientific history of the Arctic
- Category:Flora of the Arctic
- Arctic sea ice ecology and history
- Arctic shrinkage
- Tundra
- Taiga
- Sea ice
- Arctic
