= Bibliography of the scientific history of the Arctic =

- Arctic winter landscape
- Subject: Arctic
- Scope: Books, journal articles, book chapters
- Period covered: 19th century to the present
- Languages: English
- Related: Arctic ecology; Arctic Ocean; Climate change in the Arctic
- Related bibliographies: Bibliography of the human history of the Arctic; Bibliography of Antarctica

This is a select bibliography of academic level books and journal articles about the scientific history of the Arctic: the history of Arctic science, and works on the region's environment, climate change, ecology, ocean, and physical and human geography.

The Arctic (/ˈɑːr(k)tɪk/; from Ancient Greek ἄρκτος (árktos) 'bear') is the polar region of Earth that surrounds the North Pole, lying north of the Arctic Circle. Travelling east from the IERS Reference Meridian, the Arctic region consists of parts of northern Norway (Nordland, Troms, Finnmark, Svalbard and Jan Mayen), northernmost Sweden (Västerbotten, Norrbotten and Lappland), northern Finland (North Ostrobothnia, Kainuu and Lappi), northern Russia (Murmansk, Siberia, Nenets Okrug and Novaya Zemlya), the United States (Alaska), Canada (Yukon, Northwest Territories and Nunavut), the Danish Realm (Greenland), and northern Iceland (Grímsey and Kolbeinsey), along with the Arctic Ocean and adjacent seas.

Bibliography contains academic level English language books (including translations) and journal articles, published mainly post World War II. (Note: Works published before World War II should be limited to areas where there are no significant post-World War II books on the subject or when the work in question has significant historical merit.) Book entries may have references to reviews published in academic journals or major newspapers when these could be considered helpful. These reference reviews also function as a resource to find other works on this subject.

Works listed here are cited in the notes or bibliographies of scholarly sources. Each is published by an academic or major trade press, written by a recognized expert, or substantially reviewed in scholarly journals; borderline cases are omitted. Many of the books below carry their own bibliographies; see Further reading section for longer ones, and External links section for research institutes.

Citations follow APA style. (Note: Entries are in plain text APA 7 format without templates; templates are used only for reviews and notes.) Books have citations to academic journal or mainstream published reviews when available. For books only partly about the subject, give relevant chapter or section titles where useful and available. Translators of the original-language edition are included when possible. In cases where a title or name has appeared with more than one English spelling, the most recent published form is used and a footnote documents any earlier title under which the work appeared.

== History of Arctic science ==
- Barr, S., & Lüdecke, C. (Eds.). (2010). The history of the International Polar Years (IPYs). Springer. doi:10.1007/978-3-642-12402-0
- Barr, W. (1985). The expeditions of the First International Polar Year, 1882–83. Arctic Institute of North America.
- Bocking, S. (2009). A disciplined geography: Aviation, science, and the Cold War in northern Canada, 1945–1960. Technology and Culture, 50(2), 265–290. doi:10.1353/tech.0.0286
- Bravo, M., & Sörlin, S. (Eds.). (2002). Narrating the Arctic: A cultural history of Nordic scientific practices. Science History Publications.
- Dodds, K., & Sörlin, S. (Eds.). (2022). Ice humanities: Living, working, and thinking in a melting world. Manchester University Press. doi:10.7765/9781526157782
- Doel, R. E., Wråkberg, U., & Zeller, S. (2014). Science, environment, and the New Arctic. Journal of Historical Geography, 44, 2–14. doi:10.1016/j.jhg.2013.12.003
- Doel, R. E., Friedman, R. M., Lajus, J., Sörlin, S., & Wråkberg, U. (2014). Strategic Arctic science: National interests in building natural knowledge – interwar era through the Cold War. Journal of Historical Geography, 44, 60–80. doi:10.1016/j.jhg.2013.12.004
- Doel, R. E., Harper, K. C., & Heymann, M. (Eds.). (2016). Exploring Greenland: Cold War science and technology on ice. Palgrave Macmillan. doi:10.1057/978-1-137-59688-8
- Elzinga, A. (2009). Through the lens of the polar years: Changing characteristics of polar research in historical perspective. Polar Record, 45(4), 313–336. doi:10.1017/s0032247409008316
- Farish, M. (2006). Frontier engineering: From the globe to the body in the Cold War Arctic. The Canadian Geographer, 50(2), 177–196. doi:10.1111/j.0008-3658.2006.00134.x
- Farish, M. (2013). The lab and the land: Overcoming the Arctic in Cold War Alaska. Isis, 104(1), 1–29. doi:10.1086/669881
- Heggie, V. (2019). Higher and colder: A history of extreme physiology and exploration. University of Chicago Press. doi:10.7208/chicago/9780226650913.001.0001
- Herzberg, J., Kehrt, C., & Torma, F. (Eds.). (2018). Ice and snow in the Cold War: Histories of extreme climatic environments. Berghahn Books. doi:10.3167/9781785339868
- Heymann, M., Knudsen, H., Lolck, M. L., Nielsen, H., Nielsen, K. H., & Ries, C. J. (2011). Exploring Greenland: Science and technology in Cold War settings. Scientia Canadensis, 33(2), 11–42. doi:10.7202/1006149ar
- Kaalund, N. K. L. (2021). Explorations in the icy north: How travel narratives shaped Arctic science in the nineteenth century. University of Pittsburgh Press. JSTOR j.ctv1m46fj9
- Korsmo, F. L. (2007). The genesis of the International Geophysical Year. Physics Today, 60(7), 38–43. doi:10.1063/1.2761801
- Launius, R. D., Fleming, J. R., & DeVorkin, D. H. (Eds.). (2010). Globalizing polar science: Reconsidering the International Polar and Geophysical Years. Palgrave Macmillan. doi:10.1057/9780230114654
- Leary, W. M. (1999). Under ice: Waldo Lyon and the development of the Arctic submarine. Texas A&M University Press.
- Levere, T. H. (1993). Science and the Canadian Arctic: A century of exploration, 1818–1918. Cambridge University Press.
- Martin-Nielsen, J. (2012). The other cold war: The United States and Greenland's ice sheet environment, 1948–1966. Journal of Historical Geography, 38(1), 69–80. doi:10.1016/j.jhg.2011.09.004
- Martin-Nielsen, J. (2013). Eismitte in the scientific imagination: Knowledge and politics at the center of Greenland. Palgrave Macmillan. doi:10.1057/9781137375988
- Martin-Nielsen, J. (2013). 'The deepest and most rewarding hole ever drilled': Ice cores and the Cold War in Greenland. Annals of Science, 70(1), 47–70. doi:10.1080/00033790.2012.721123
- Nielsen, K. H., & Nielsen, H. (2021). Camp Century: The untold story of America's secret Arctic military base under the Greenland ice. Columbia University Press. doi:10.7312/niel20176
- Nielsen, K. H., Nielsen, H., & Martin-Nielsen, J. (2014). City under the ice: The closed world of Camp Century in Cold War culture. Science as Culture, 23(4), 443–464. doi:10.1080/09505431.2014.884063
- Powell, R. C. (2007). 'The rigours of an Arctic experiment': The precarious authority of field practices in the Canadian High Arctic, 1958–1970. Environment and Planning A, 39(8), 1794–1811. doi:10.1068/a38294
- Powell, R. C. (2008). Science, sovereignty and nation: Canada and the legacy of the International Geophysical Year, 1957–1958. Journal of Historical Geography, 34(4), 618–638. doi:10.1016/j.jhg.2008.08.005
- Powell, R. C. (2017). Studying Arctic fields: Cultures, practices, and environmental sciences. McGill-Queen's University Press. doi:10.1515/9780773552555
- Roberts, P., & Paglia, E. (2016). Science as national belonging: The construction of Svalbard as a Norwegian space. Social Studies of Science, 46(6), 894–911. doi:10.1177/0306312716639153
- Sörlin, S. (Ed.). (2013). Science, geopolitics and culture in the polar region: Norden beyond borders. Ashgate.
- Stuhl, A. (2016). Unfreezing the Arctic: Science, colonialism, and the transformation of Inuit lands. University of Chicago Press. doi:10.7208/chicago/9780226416786.001.0001
- Turchetti, S., & Roberts, P. (Eds.). (2014). The surveillance imperative: Geosciences during the Cold War and beyond. Palgrave Macmillan. doi:10.1057/9781137438744
- Wråkberg, U. (2006). Nature conservationism and the Arctic commons of Spitsbergen 1900–1920. Acta Borealia, 23(1), 1–23. doi:10.1080/08003830600789333

== Environment ==
- Avango, D., Hacquebord, L., & Wråkberg, U. (2014). Industrial extraction of Arctic natural resources since the sixteenth century: Technoscience and geo-economics in the history of northern whaling and mining. Journal of Historical Geography, 44, 15–30. doi:10.1016/j.jhg.2014.01.001
- Bocking, S. (2007). Science and spaces in the northern environment. Environmental History, 12(4), 867–894. doi:10.1093/envhis/12.4.867
- Bocking, S., & Martin, B. (Eds.). (2017). Ice blink: Navigating northern environmental history. University of Calgary Press. doi:10.1515/9781552388563
- Bruno, A. (2016). The nature of Soviet power: An Arctic environmental history. Cambridge University Press. doi:10.1017/cbo9781316534762
- Busch, B. C. (1985). The war against the seals: A history of the North American seal fishery. McGill-Queen's University Press.
- Cameron, E. (2015). Far off metal river: Inuit lands, settler stories, and the making of the contemporary Arctic. UBC Press. doi:10.59962/9780774828864
- Caulfield, R. A. (1997). Greenlanders, whales, and whaling: Sustainability and self-determination in the Arctic. University Press of New England. doi:10.1349/ddlp.777
- Coates, P. A. (1991). The trans-Alaska pipeline controversy: Technology, conservation, and the frontier. Lehigh University Press.
- Cone, M. (2005). Silent snow: The slow poisoning of the Arctic. Grove Press.
- Cruikshank, J. (2005). Do glaciers listen? Local knowledge, colonial encounters, and social imagination. UBC Press. doi:10.59962/9780774851404
- Demuth, B. (2019). Floating coast: An environmental history of the Bering Strait. W. W. Norton.
- Freeman, M. M. R., Egede, I., Bogoslovskaya, L., Krupnik, I. I., Caulfield, R. A., & Stevenson, M. G. (1998). Inuit, whaling, and sustainability. AltaMira Press.
- Hacquebord, L., & Avango, D. (2009). Settlements in an Arctic resource frontier region. Arctic Anthropology, 46(1–2), 25–39. doi:10.1353/arc.0.0028
- Howkins, A. (2016). The polar regions: An environmental history. Polity.
- Huntington, H. P. (1992). Wildlife management and subsistence hunting in Alaska. University of Washington Press.
- Jones, R. T. (2014). Empire of extinction: Russians and the North Pacific's strange beasts of the sea, 1741–1867. Oxford University Press. doi:10.1093/acprof:oso/9780199343416.001.0001
- Josephson, P. R. (2014). The conquest of the Russian Arctic. Harvard University Press. doi:10.4159/harvard.9780674419827
- Jørgensen, D., & Sörlin, S. (Eds.). (2013). Northscapes: History, technology, and the making of northern environments. UBC Press. doi:10.59962/9780774825733
- Keeling, A. (2010). 'Born in an atomic test tube': Landscapes of cyclonic development at Uranium City, Saskatchewan. The Canadian Geographer, 54(2), 228–252. doi:10.1111/j.1541-0064.2009.00294.x
- Keeling, A., & Sandlos, J. (Eds.). (2015). Mining and communities in Northern Canada: History, politics, and memory. University of Calgary Press. doi:10.1515/9781552388068
- Kohlhoff, D. W. (2002). Amchitka and the bomb: Nuclear testing in Alaska. University of Washington Press. doi:10.1515/9780295800509
- Körber, L.-A., MacKenzie, S., & Westerståhl Stenport, A. (Eds.). (2017). Arctic environmental modernities: From the age of polar exploration to the era of the Anthropocene. Palgrave Macmillan. doi:10.1007/978-3-319-39116-8
- Kulchyski, P., & Tester, F. J. (2007). Kiumajut (talking back): Game management and Inuit rights, 1900–70. UBC Press. doi:10.59962/9780774855525
- McCandless, R. G. (1985). Yukon wildlife: A social history. University of Alberta Press.
- Morse, K. (2003). The nature of gold: An environmental history of the Klondike gold rush. University of Washington Press. doi:10.1515/9780295989877
- Nadasdy, P. (2003). Hunters and bureaucrats: Power, knowledge, and aboriginal-state relations in the southwest Yukon. UBC Press. doi:10.59962/9780774851886
- Piper, L., & Sandlos, J. (2007). A broken frontier: Ecological imperialism in the Canadian North. Environmental History, 12(4), 759–795. doi:10.1093/envhis/12.4.759
- Piper, L. (2009). The industrial transformation of subarctic Canada. UBC Press. doi:10.59962/9780774815345
- Sandlos, J. (2007). Hunters at the margin: Native people and wildlife conservation in the Northwest Territories. UBC Press. doi:10.59962/9780774855884
- Sandlos, J., & Keeling, A. (2012). Claiming the new North: Development and colonialism at the Pine Point Mine, Northwest Territories, Canada. Environment and History, 18(1), 5–34. doi:10.3197/096734012x13225062753543
- Sandlos, J., & Keeling, A. (2016). Toxic legacies, slow violence, and environmental injustice at Giant Mine, Northwest Territories. The Northern Review, (42), 7–21. doi:10.22584/nr42.2016.002
- Sörlin, S. (Ed.). (2022). Resource extraction and Arctic communities: The new extractivist paradigm. Cambridge University Press. doi:10.1017/9781009110044
- Stuhl, A. (2016). Unfreezing the Arctic: Science, colonialism, and the transformation of Inuit lands. University of Chicago Press. doi:10.7208/chicago/9780226416786.001.0001
- Wenzel, G. (1991). Animal rights, human rights: Ecology, economy, and ideology in the Canadian Arctic. University of Toronto Press. doi:10.3138/9781442670877

== Climate change ==
- Alley, R. B. (2000). The two-mile time machine: Ice cores, abrupt climate change, and our future. Princeton University Press. doi:10.1515/9781400852246
- Anderson, A. (2009). After the ice: Life, death, and geopolitics in the new Arctic. Smithsonian Books.
- Arctic Climate Impact Assessment. (2005). Arctic climate impact assessment: Scientific report. Cambridge University Press.
- Box, J. E., Colgan, W. T., Christensen, T. R., Schmidt, N. M., Lund, M., Parmentier, F.-J. W., Brown, R., Bhatt, U. S., Euskirchen, E. S., Romanovsky, V. E., Walsh, J. E., Overland, J. E., Wang, M., Corell, R. W., Meier, W. N., Wouters, B., Mernild, S., Mård, J., Pawlak, J., & Olsen, M. S. (2019). Key indicators of Arctic climate change: 1971–2017. Environmental Research Letters, 14(4), Article 045010. doi:10.1088/1748-9326/aafc1b
- Bravo, M. T. (2009). Voices from the sea ice: The reception of climate impact narratives. Journal of Historical Geography, 35(2), 256–278. doi:10.1016/j.jhg.2008.09.007
- Christensen, M., Nilsson, A. E., & Wormbs, N. (Eds.). (2013). Media and the politics of Arctic climate change: When the ice breaks. Palgrave Macmillan. doi:10.1057/9781137266231
- Comiso, J. C., Parkinson, C. L., Gersten, R., & Stock, L. (2008). Accelerated decline in the Arctic sea ice cover. Geophysical Research Letters, 35(1). doi:10.1029/2007gl031972
- Cruikshank, J. (2005). Do glaciers listen? Local knowledge, colonial encounters, and social imagination. UBC Press. doi:10.59962/9780774851404
- Dai, A., Luo, D., Song, M., & Liu, J. (2019). Arctic amplification is caused by sea-ice loss under increasing CO_{2}. Nature Communications, 10(1), Article 121. doi:10.1038/s41467-018-07954-9
- Dansgaard, W. (2004). Frozen annals: Greenland ice sheet research. Narayana Press.
- Emmerson, C. (2010). The future history of the Arctic. PublicAffairs.
- Ford, J. D., & Smit, B. (2004). A framework for assessing the vulnerability of communities in the Canadian Arctic to risks associated with climate change. Arctic, 57(4). doi:10.14430/arctic516
- Ford, J. D., Smit, B., & Wandel, J. (2006). Vulnerability to climate change in the Arctic: A case study from Arctic Bay, Canada. Global Environmental Change, 16(2), 145–160. doi:10.1016/j.gloenvcha.2005.11.007
- Francis, J. A., & Vavrus, S. J. (2012). Evidence linking Arctic amplification to extreme weather in mid-latitudes. Geophysical Research Letters, 39(6). doi:10.1029/2012gl051000
- Gearheard, S. F., Kielsen Holm, L., Huntington, H., Leavitt, J. M., Mahoney, A. R., Opie, M., Oshima, T., & Sanguya, J. (Eds.). (2013). The meaning of ice: People and sea ice in three Arctic communities. International Polar Institute Press.
- Hassol, S. J. (2004). Impacts of a warming Arctic: Arctic Climate Impact Assessment. Cambridge University Press.
- Hovelsrud, G. K., & Smit, B. (Eds.). (2010). Community adaptation and vulnerability in Arctic regions. Springer. doi:10.1007/978-90-481-9174-1
- Kaufman, D. S., Schneider, D. P., McKay, N. P., Ammann, C. M., Bradley, R. S., Briffa, K. R., Miller, G. H., Otto-Bliesner, B. L., Overpeck, J. T., Vinther, B. M., & Arctic Lakes 2k Project Members. (2009). Recent warming reverses long-term Arctic cooling. Science, 325(5945), 1236–1239. doi:10.1126/science.1173983
- Kinnard, C., Zdanowicz, C. M., Fisher, D. A., Isaksson, E., de Vernal, A., & Thompson, L. G. (2011). Reconstructed changes in Arctic sea ice over the past 1,450 years. Nature, 479(7374), 509–512. doi:10.1038/nature10581
- Krupnik, I., & Jolly, D. (Eds.). (2002). The earth is faster now: Indigenous observations of Arctic environmental change. Arctic Research Consortium of the United States.
- Krupnik, I., Aporta, C., Gearheard, S., Laidler, G. J., & Kielsen Holm, L. (Eds.). (2010). SIKU: Knowing our ice: Documenting Inuit sea ice knowledge and use. Springer. doi:10.1007/978-90-481-8587-0
- Leduc, T. B. (2010). Climate, culture, change: Inuit and Western dialogues with a warming North. University of Ottawa Press. doi:10.1353/book2098
- Marino, E. (2015). Fierce climate, sacred ground: An ethnography of climate change in Shishmaref, Alaska. University of Alaska Press. doi:10.5876/9781602232679
- Mayewski, P. A., & White, F. (2002). The ice chronicles: The quest to understand global climate change. University Press of New England.
- Miller, G. H., Alley, R. B., Brigham-Grette, J., Fitzpatrick, J. J., Polyak, L., Serreze, M. C., & White, J. W. C. (2010). Arctic amplification: Can the past constrain the future? Quaternary Science Reviews, 29(15–16), 1779–1790. doi:10.1016/j.quascirev.2010.02.008
- Nichols, T., Berkes, F., Jolly, D., Snow, N. B., & the Community of Sachs Harbour. (2004). Climate change and sea ice: Local observations from the Canadian Western Arctic. Arctic, 57(1). doi:10.14430/arctic484
- Notz, D., & Stroeve, J. (2016). Observed Arctic sea-ice loss directly follows anthropogenic CO_{2} emission. Science, 354(6313), 747–750. doi:10.1126/science.aag2345
- Nuttall, M. (2017). Climate, society and subsurface politics in Greenland: Under the great ice. Routledge. doi:10.4324/9781315743844
- Overpeck, J., Hughen, K., Hardy, D., Bradley, R., Case, R., Douglas, M., Finney, B., Gajewski, K., Jacoby, G., Jennings, A., Lamoureux, S., Lasca, A., MacDonald, G., Moore, J., Retelle, M., Smith, S., Wolfe, A., & Zielinski, G. (1997). Arctic environmental change of the last four centuries. Science, 278(5341), 1251–1256. doi:10.1126/science.278.5341.1251
- Rantanen, M., Karpechko, A. Y., Lipponen, A., Nordling, K., Hyvärinen, O., Ruosteenoja, K., Vihma, T., & Laaksonen, A. (2022). The Arctic has warmed nearly four times faster than the globe since 1979. Communications Earth & Environment, 3(1), Article 168. doi:10.1038/s43247-022-00498-3
- Riedlinger, D., & Berkes, F. (2001). Contributions of traditional knowledge to understanding climate change in the Canadian Arctic. Polar Record, 37(203), 315–328. doi:10.1017/s0032247400017058
- Sakakibara, C. (2020). Whale snow: Iñupiat, climate change, and multispecies resilience in Arctic Alaska. University of Arizona Press. JSTOR j.ctv1595kz4
- Screen, J. A., & Simmonds, I. (2010). The central role of diminishing sea ice in recent Arctic temperature amplification. Nature, 464(7293), 1334–1337. doi:10.1038/nature09051
- Serreze, M. C., & Francis, J. A. (2006). The Arctic amplification debate. Climatic Change, 76(3–4), 241–264. doi:10.1007/s10584-005-9017-y
- Serreze, M. C., Holland, M. M., & Stroeve, J. (2007). Perspectives on the Arctic's shrinking sea-ice cover. Science, 315(5818), 1533–1536. doi:10.1126/science.1139426
- Serreze, M. C., & Barry, R. G. (2014). The Arctic climate system. Cambridge University Press. doi:10.1017/cbo9781139583817
- Serreze, M. C. (2018). Brave new Arctic: The untold story of the melting North. Princeton University Press. doi:10.23943/9781400890255
- Sörlin, S. (2009). Narratives and counter-narratives of climate change: North Atlantic glaciology and meteorology, c.1930–1955. Journal of Historical Geography, 35(2), 237–255. doi:10.1016/j.jhg.2008.09.003
- Strauss-Mazzullo, H., & Tennberg, M. (Eds.). (2023). Living and working with snow, ice and seasons in the modern Arctic: Everyday perspectives. Springer. doi:10.1007/978-3-031-36445-7
- Stroeve, J., Holland, M. M., Meier, W., Scambos, T., & Serreze, M. (2007). Arctic sea ice decline: Faster than forecast. Geophysical Research Letters, 34(9). doi:10.1029/2007gl029703
- Stroeve, J. C., Serreze, M. C., Holland, M. M., Kay, J. E., Malanik, J., & Barrett, A. P. (2012). The Arctic's rapidly shrinking sea ice cover: A research synthesis. Climatic Change, 110(3–4), 1005–1027. doi:10.1007/s10584-011-0101-1
- Struzik, E. (2009). The big thaw: Travels in the melting North. John Wiley & Sons Canada.
- Struzik, E. (2015). Future Arctic: Field notes from a world on the edge. Island Press. doi:10.5822/978-1-61091-592-2
- Wadhams, P. (2016). A farewell to ice: A report from the Arctic. Allen Lane.
- Watt-Cloutier, S. (2015). The right to be cold: One woman's story of protecting her culture, the Arctic and the whole planet. Allen Lane.
- Wohlforth, C. (2004). The whale and the supercomputer: On the northern front of climate change. North Point Press.
- Wood, K. R., & Overland, J. E. (2010). Early 20th century Arctic warming in retrospect. International Journal of Climatology, 30(9), 1269–1279. doi:10.1002/joc.1973
- Wormbs, N. (Ed.). (2018). Competing Arctic futures: Historical and contemporary perspectives. Palgrave Macmillan. doi:10.1007/978-3-319-91617-0
- Wright, S. (2014). Our ice is vanishing / Sikuvut nunguliqtuq: A history of Inuit, newcomers, and climate change. McGill-Queen's University Press. doi:10.1515/9780773596108
- Wrigley, C. (2023). Earth, ice, bone, blood: Permafrost and extinction in the Russian Arctic. University of Minnesota Press. doi:10.5749/9781452968971
- Zubrow, E. B. W., Meidinger, E., & Connolly, K. D. (Eds.). (2019). The big thaw: Policy, governance, and climate change in the circumpolar North. SUNY Press. doi:10.1515/9781438475653

== Ecology ==
- Bergerud, A. T., Luttich, S. N., & Camps, L. (2007). The return of caribou to Ungava. McGill-Queen's University Press. JSTOR j.ctt817j4
- Bliss, L. C., Heal, O. W., & Moore, J. J. (Eds.). (1981). Tundra ecosystems: A comparative analysis. Cambridge University Press.
- Brown, J., Miller, P. C., Tieszen, L. L., & Bunnell, F. L. (Eds.). (1980). An Arctic ecosystem: The coastal tundra at Barrow, Alaska. Dowden, Hutchinson & Ross.
- Chapin, F. S., III, Jefferies, R. L., Reynolds, J. F., & Shaver, G. R. (Eds.). (1992). Arctic ecosystems in a changing climate: An ecophysiological perspective. Academic Press. doi:10.1016/c2009-0-02634-8
- Chernov, Y. I. (1985). The living tundra (D. Löve, Trans.). Cambridge University Press.
- Crawford, R. M. M. (2013). Tundra–taiga biology: Human, plant, and animal survival in the Arctic. Oxford University Press. doi:10.1093/acprof:osobl/9780199559404.001.0001
- Derocher, A. E. (2012). Polar bears: A complete guide to their biology and behavior. Johns Hopkins University Press. doi:10.56021/9781421403052
- Herman, Y. (Ed.). (1989). The Arctic seas: Climatology, oceanography, geology, and biology. Van Nostrand Reinhold.
- Hobbie, J. E., & Kling, G. W. (Eds.). (2014). Alaska's changing Arctic: Ecological consequences for tundra, streams, and lakes. Oxford University Press. doi:10.1093/acprof:osobl/9780199860401.001.0001
- Huntington, H. P. (2000). Using traditional ecological knowledge in science: Methods and applications. Ecological Applications, 10(5), 1270–1274. doi:10.1890/1051-0761(2000)010[1270:utekis]2.0.co;2
- Kelsall, J. P. (1968). The migratory barren-ground caribou of Canada. Queen's Printer.
- Lopez, B. (1986). Arctic dreams: Imagination and desire in a northern landscape. Scribner.
- Meltofte, H., Christensen, T. R., Elberling, B., Forchhammer, M. C., & Rasch, M. (Eds.). (2008). High-Arctic ecosystem dynamics in a changing climate: Ten years of monitoring and research at Zackenberg Research Station, Northeast Greenland (Advances in Ecological Research, Vol. 40). Elsevier. doi:10.1016/s0065-2504(07)x0001-1
- Nelson, R. K. (1983). Make prayers to the raven: A Koyukon view of the northern forest. University of Chicago Press. doi:10.7208/chicago/9780226767857.001.0001
- Nuttall, M., & Callaghan, T. V. (Eds.). (2000). The Arctic: Environment, people, policy. Harwood Academic Publishers.
- Pielou, E. C. (1994). A naturalist's guide to the Arctic. University of Chicago Press. doi:10.7208/chicago/9780226148670.001.0001
- Post, E., Forchhammer, M. C., Bret-Harte, M. S., Callaghan, T. V., Christensen, T. R., Elberling, B., Fox, A. D., Gilg, O., Hik, D. S., Høye, T. T., Ims, R. A., Jeppesen, E., Klein, D. R., Madsen, J., McGuire, A. D., Rysgaard, S., Schindler, D. E., Stirling, I., Tamstorf, M. P., ... Aastrup, P. (2009). Ecological dynamics across the Arctic associated with recent climate change. Science, 325(5946), 1355–1358. doi:10.1126/science.1173113
- Pruitt, W. O., Jr. (1967). Animals of the north. Harper & Row.
- Remmert, H. (1980). Arctic animal ecology. Springer. doi:10.1007/978-3-642-67710-6
- Sage, B. (1986). The Arctic and its wildlife. Croom Helm.
- Sale, R. (2006). A complete guide to Arctic wildlife. Christopher Helm.
- Smith, W. O., & Grebmeier, J. M. (Eds.). (1995). Arctic oceanography: Marginal ice zones and continental shelves. American Geophysical Union. doi:10.1029/ce049
- Stirling, I. (2011). Polar bears: The natural history of a threatened species. Fitzhenry & Whiteside.
- Stonehouse, B. (1989). Polar ecology. Blackie.
- Sturm, M., Racine, C., & Tape, K. (2001). Increasing shrub abundance in the Arctic. Nature, 411(6837), 546–547. doi:10.1038/35079180
- Svoboda, J., & Freedman, B. (Eds.). (1994). Ecology of a polar oasis: Alexandra Fiord, Ellesmere Island, Canada. Captus University Publications.
- Thomas, D. N., Fogg, G. E., Convey, P., Fritsen, C. H., Gili, J.-M., Gradinger, R., Laybourn-Parry, J., Reid, K., & Walton, D. W. H. (2008). The biology of polar regions. Oxford University Press. doi:10.1093/acprof:oso/9780199298112.001.0001
- Wassmann, P., Duarte, C. M., Agustí, S., & Sejr, M. K. (2011). Footprints of climate change in the Arctic marine ecosystem. Global Change Biology, 17(2), 1235–1249. doi:10.1111/j.1365-2486.2010.02311.x
- Wielgolaski, F. E. (Ed.). (1975). Fennoscandian tundra ecosystems: Part 1. Plants and microorganisms. Springer. doi:10.1007/978-3-642-80937-8
- Woodin, S. J., & Marquiss, M. (Eds.). (1997). Ecology of Arctic environments. Blackwell Science.
- Young, S. B. (1989). To the Arctic: An introduction to the far northern world. John Wiley.

== Arctic Ocean studies ==
- Aagaard, K., Coachman, L. K., & Carmack, E. (1981). On the halocline of the Arctic Ocean. Deep Sea Research Part A. Oceanographic Research Papers, 28(6), 529–545. doi:10.1016/0198-0149(81)90115-1
- Aagaard, K., & Carmack, E. C. (1989). The role of sea ice and other fresh water in the Arctic circulation. Journal of Geophysical Research: Oceans, 94(C10), 14485–14498. doi:10.1029/jc094ic10p14485
- Arrigo, K. R., van Dijken, G., & Pabi, S. (2008). Impact of a shrinking Arctic ice cover on marine primary production. Geophysical Research Letters, 35(19). doi:10.1029/2008gl035028
- Brigham, L. W. (Ed.). (1991). The Soviet maritime Arctic. Belhaven Press.
- Carmack, E., Polyakov, I., Padman, L., Fer, I., Hunke, E., Hutchings, J., Jackson, J., Kelley, D., Kwok, R., Layton, C., Melling, H., Perovich, D., Persson, O., Ruddick, B., Timmermans, M.-L., Toole, J., Ross, T., Vavrus, S., & Winsor, P. (2015). Toward quantifying the increasing role of oceanic heat in sea ice loss in the new Arctic. Bulletin of the American Meteorological Society, 96(12), 2079–2105. doi:10.1175/bams-d-13-00177.1
- Dickson, R. R., Meincke, J., & Rhines, P. (Eds.). (2008). Arctic–subarctic ocean fluxes: Defining the role of the northern seas in climate. Springer. doi:10.1007/978-1-4020-6774-7
- Grebmeier, J. M., & Maslowski, W. (Eds.). (2014). The Pacific Arctic region: Ecosystem status and trends in a rapidly changing environment. Springer. doi:10.1007/978-94-017-8863-2
- Herman, Y. (Ed.). (1989). The Arctic seas: Climatology, oceanography, geology, and biology. Van Nostrand Reinhold.
- Jakobsson, M., Mayer, L., Coakley, B., Dowdeswell, J. A., Forbes, S., Fridman, B., Hodnesdal, H., Noormets, R., Pedersen, R., Rebesco, M., Schenke, H. W., Zarayskaya, Y., Accettella, D., Armstrong, A., Anderson, R. M., Bienhoff, P., Camerlenghi, A., Church, I., Edwards, M., ... Weatherall, P. (2012). The International Bathymetric Chart of the Arctic Ocean (IBCAO) version 3.0. Geophysical Research Letters, 39(12). doi:10.1029/2012gl052219
- Johannessen, O. M., Bobylev, L. P., Shalina, E. V., & Sandven, S. (2020). Sea ice in the Arctic: Past, present and future. Springer. doi:10.1007/978-3-030-21301-5
- Kassens, H., Bauch, H. A., Dmitrenko, I. A., Eicken, H., Hubberten, H.-W., Melles, M., Thiede, J., & Timokhov, L. A. (Eds.). (1999). Land-ocean systems in the Siberian Arctic: Dynamics and history. Springer. doi:10.1007/978-3-642-60134-7
- Kwok, R., & Rothrock, D. A. (2009). Decline in Arctic sea ice thickness from submarine and ICESat records: 1958–2008. Geophysical Research Letters, 36(15). doi:10.1029/2009gl039035
- Leppäranta, M. (2005). The drift of sea ice. Springer. doi:10.1007/b138386
- Lewis, E. L., Jones, E. P., Lemke, P., Prowse, T. D., & Wadhams, P. (Eds.). (2000). The freshwater budget of the Arctic Ocean. Kluwer Academic. doi:10.1007/978-94-011-4132-1
- Maslanik, J. A., Fowler, C., Stroeve, J., Drobot, S., Zwally, J., Yi, D., & Emery, W. (2007). A younger, thinner Arctic ice cover: Increased potential for rapid, extensive sea-ice loss. Geophysical Research Letters, 34(24). doi:10.1029/2007gl032043
- Moran, K., & Backman, J. (2006). The Arctic Coring Expedition (ACEX) recovers a Cenozoic history of the Arctic Ocean. Oceanography, 19(4), 162–167. doi:10.5670/oceanog.2006.14
- Morison, J., Kwok, R., Peralta-Ferriz, C., Alkire, M., Rigor, I., Andersen, R., & Steele, M. (2012). Changing Arctic Ocean freshwater pathways. Nature, 481(7379), 66–70. doi:10.1038/nature10705
- Perovich, D. K., Richter-Menge, J. A., Jones, K. F., & Light, B. (2008). Sunlight, water, and ice: Extreme Arctic sea ice melt during the summer of 2007. Geophysical Research Letters, 35(11). doi:10.1029/2008gl034007
- Polyakov, I. V., Pnyushkov, A. V., Alkire, M. B., Ashik, I. M., Baumann, T. M., Carmack, E. C., Goszczko, I., Guthrie, J., Ivanov, V. V., Kanzow, T., Krishfield, R., Kwok, R., Sundfjord, A., Morison, J., Rember, R., & Yulin, A. (2017). Greater role for Atlantic inflows on sea-ice loss in the Eurasian Basin of the Arctic Ocean. Science, 356(6335), 285–291. doi:10.1126/science.aai8204
- Rothrock, D. A., Yu, Y., & Maykut, G. A. (1999). Thinning of the Arctic sea-ice cover. Geophysical Research Letters, 26(23), 3469–3472. doi:10.1029/1999gl010863
- Rudels, B. (2015). Arctic Ocean circulation, processes and water masses: A description of observations and ideas with focus on the period prior to the International Polar Year 2007–2009. Progress in Oceanography, 132, 22–67. doi:10.1016/j.pocean.2013.11.006
- Shokr, M., & Sinha, N. (2015). Sea ice: Physics and remote sensing. Wiley. doi:10.1002/9781119028000
- Smith, L. C., & Stephenson, S. R. (2013). New Trans-Arctic shipping routes navigable by midcentury. Proceedings of the National Academy of Sciences, 110(13). doi:10.1073/pnas.1214212110
- Smith, W. O., Jr. (Ed.). (1990). Polar oceanography (2 vols.). Academic Press.
- Smith, W. O., & Grebmeier, J. M. (Eds.). (1995). Arctic oceanography: Marginal ice zones and continental shelves. American Geophysical Union. doi:10.1029/ce049
- Sörlin, S. (2017). The Arctic Ocean. In D. Armitage, A. Bashford, & S. Sivasundaram (Eds.), Oceanic histories (pp. 269–295). Cambridge University Press. doi:10.1017/9781108399722.011
- Stein, R., & Macdonald, R. W. (Eds.). (2004). The organic carbon cycle in the Arctic Ocean. Springer. doi:10.1007/978-3-642-18912-8
- Stein, R. (2008). Arctic Ocean sediments: Processes, proxies, and paleoenvironment. Elsevier.
- Østreng, W., Eger, K. M., Fløistad, B., Jørgensen-Dahl, A., Lothe, L., Mejlænder-Larsen, M., & Wergeland, T. (2013). Shipping in Arctic waters: A comparison of the Northeast, Northwest and trans polar passages. Springer. doi:10.1007/978-3-642-16790-4
- Thomas, D. N., & Dieckmann, G. S. (Eds.). (2010). Sea ice (2nd ed.). Wiley-Blackwell. doi:10.1002/9781444317145
- Untersteiner, N. (Ed.). (1986). The geophysics of sea ice. Plenum Press. doi:10.1007/978-1-4899-5352-0
- Wadhams, P. (2000). Ice in the ocean. Gordon and Breach.
- Wadhams, P. (2016). A farewell to ice: A report from the Arctic. Allen Lane.
- Weeks, W. F., & Hibler, W. D., III. (2010). On sea ice. University of Alaska Press. doi:10.5876/9781602231016
- Zubov, N. N. (1963). Arctic ice. U.S. Navy Electronics Laboratory.

== Geography ==
- Armstrong, T., Rogers, G., & Rowley, G. (1978). The circumpolar North: A political and economic geography of the Arctic and sub-Arctic. Methuen.
- Ballantyne, C. K. (2018). Periglacial geomorphology. Wiley-Blackwell.
- Bird, J. B. (1967). The physiography of Arctic Canada: With special reference to the area south of Parry Channel. Johns Hopkins Press.
- Bone, R. M. (1992). The geography of the Canadian North: Issues and challenges. Oxford University Press.
- Brown, R. J. E. (1970). Permafrost in Canada: Its influence on northern development. University of Toronto Press. doi:10.3138/9781442632615
- Chaturvedi, S. (1996). The polar regions: A political geography. John Wiley.
- Dodds, K. (2010). Flag planting and finger pointing: The Law of the Sea, the Arctic and the political geographies of the outer continental shelf. Political Geography, 29(2), 63–73. doi:10.1016/j.polgeo.2010.02.004
- Dodds, K., & Nuttall, M. (2019). The Arctic: What everyone needs to know. Oxford University Press. doi:10.1093/wentk/9780190649814.001.0001
- Fondahl, G. (1998). Gaining ground? Evenkis, land, and reform in southeastern Siberia. Allyn and Bacon.
- French, H. M., & Slaymaker, O. (Eds.). (1993). Canada's cold environments. McGill-Queen's University Press. doi:10.1515/9780773563544
- French, H. M. (2017). The periglacial environment (4th ed.). Wiley. doi:10.1002/9781119132820
- Hall, C. M., & Saarinen, J. (Eds.). (2010). Tourism and change in polar regions. Routledge. doi:10.4324/9780203851807
- Hamelin, L.-E. (1978). Canadian nordicity: It's your north, too (W. Barr, Trans.). Harvest House.
- Heininen, L., & Southcott, C. (Eds.). (2010). Globalization and the circumpolar North. University of Alaska Press. doi:10.5876/9781602231047
- Heleniak, T. (1999). Out-migration and depopulation of the Russian North during the 1990s. Post-Soviet Geography and Economics, 40(3), 155–205. doi:10.1080/10889388.1999.10641111
- Hill, F., & Gaddy, C. G. (2003). The Siberian curse: How communist planners left Russia out in the cold. Brookings Institution Press.
- Ives, J. D., & Barry, R. G. (Eds.). (1974). Arctic and alpine environments. Methuen.
- Larsen, J. N., & Fondahl, G. (Eds.). (2015). Arctic human development report: Regional processes and global linkages. Nordic Council of Ministers. doi:10.6027/tn2014-567
- Lopez, B. (1986). Arctic dreams: Imagination and desire in a northern landscape. Scribner.
- Nuttall, M., & Callaghan, T. V. (Eds.). (2000). The Arctic: Environment, people, policy. Harwood Academic Publishers.
- Orttung, R. W. (Ed.). (2016). Sustaining Russia's Arctic cities: Resource politics, migration, and climate change. Berghahn Books. JSTOR j.ctvswx6s0
- Petrov, A. N., BurnSilver, S., Chapin, F. S., Fondahl, G., Graybill, J., Keil, K., Nilsson, A. E., Riedlsperger, R., & Schweitzer, P. (2016). Arctic sustainability research: Toward a new agenda. Polar Geography, 39(3), 165–178. doi:10.1080/1088937x.2016.1217095
- Sale, R. (2008). The Arctic: The complete story. Frances Lincoln.
- Southcott, C. (Ed.). (2015). Northern communities working together: The social economy of Canada's North. University of Toronto Press. doi:10.3138/9781442664340
- Steinberg, P. E. (2010). You are (not) here: On the ambiguity of flag planting and finger pointing in the Arctic. Political Geography, 29(2), 81–84. doi:10.1016/j.polgeo.2010.02.003
- Sugden, D. E. (1982). Arctic and Antarctic: A modern geographical synthesis. Blackwell.
- Washburn, A. L. (1979). Geocryology: A survey of periglacial processes and environments. Edward Arnold.
- Williams, P. J., & Smith, M. W. (1989). The frozen earth: Fundamentals of geocryology. Cambridge University Press. doi:10.1017/cbo9780511564437
- Wonders, W. C. (Ed.). (1972). The North. University of Toronto Press.
- Young, S. B. (1989). To the Arctic: An introduction to the far northern world. John Wiley.

== See also ==
- Arctic ecology
- Arctic Ocean
- Bibliography of Antarctica
- Bibliography of the human history of the Arctic
- Climate change in the Arctic
- International Polar Year
