= Bibliography of the human history of the Arctic =

- Arctic indigenous people
- Subject: Arctic
- Scope: Books, journal articles, book chapters
- Period covered: Prehistory to the present
- Languages: English
- Related: Arctic exploration; Arctic Ocean; Bibliography of Antarctica
- Related bibliographies: Bibliography of Canadian history; Bibliography of Russian history (1613–1917); Bibliography of the scientific history of the Arctic; Bibliography of the Soviet Union; Circumpolar peoples
- Related timelines and lists: List of Arctic expeditions
- Related outlines and indexes: List of polar explorers

This is a select bibliography of academic level books and journal articles about the human history of the Arctic and necessary historical context.

The Arctic (/ˈɑːr(k)tɪk/; from Ancient Greek ἄρκτος (árktos) 'bear') is the polar region of Earth that surrounds the North Pole, lying north of the Arctic Circle. Travelling east from the IERS Reference Meridian, the Arctic region consists of parts of northern Norway (Nordland, Troms, Finnmark, Svalbard and Jan Mayen), northernmost Sweden (Västerbotten, Norrbotten and Lappland), northern Finland (North Ostrobothnia, Kainuu and Lappi), northern Russia (Murmansk, Siberia, Nenets Okrug and Novaya Zemlya), the United States (Alaska), Canada (Yukon, Northwest Territories and Nunavut), the Danish Realm (Greenland), and northern Iceland (Grímsey and Kolbeinsey), along with the Arctic Ocean and adjacent seas.

Bibliography contains academic level English language books (including translations) and journal articles, published mainly post World War II. (Note: Works published before World War II should be limited to areas where there are no significant post-World War II books on the subject or when the work in question has significant historical merit.) Book entries may have references to reviews published in academic journals or major newspapers when these could be considered helpful. These reference reviews also function as a resource to find other works on this subject.

Works listed here are cited in the notes or bibliographies of scholarly sources. Each is published by an academic or major trade press, written by a recognized expert, or substantially reviewed in scholarly journals; borderline cases are omitted. A selection of primary sources is included. Many of the books below carry their own bibliographies; see Further reading section for longer ones, and External links section for historical sites and museums.

Citations follow APA style. (Note: Entries are in plain text APA 7 format without templates; templates are used only for reviews and notes.) Books have citations to academic journal or mainstream published reviews when available. For books only partly about the subject, give relevant chapter or section titles where useful and available. Translators of the original-language edition are included when possible. In cases where a title or name has appeared with more than one English spelling, the most recent published form is used and a footnote documents any earlier title under which the work appeared.

== General surveys ==
- Bravo, M. (2019). North Pole: Nature and culture. Reaktion Books.
- Davidson, P. (2005). The idea of north. Reaktion Books.
- Dodds, K., & Woodward, J. (2021). The Arctic: A very short introduction. Oxford University Press. doi:10.1093/actrade/9780198819288.001.0001
- Hayes, D. (2003). Historical atlas of the Arctic. Douglas & McIntyre.
- Holland, C. (1994). Arctic exploration and development, c. 500 B.C. to 1915: An encyclopedia. Garland.
- Howkins, A., & Roberts, P. (Eds.). (2023). The Cambridge history of the polar regions. Cambridge University Press. doi:10.1017/9781108555654
- Hund, A. J. (Ed.). (2014). Antarctica and the Arctic Circle: A geographic encyclopedia of the Earth's polar regions (2 vols.). ABC-CLIO. doi:10.5040/9798400613265
- McCannon, J. (2012). A history of the Arctic: Nature, exploration and exploitation. Reaktion Books.
- McGhee, R. (2006). The last imaginary place: A human history of the Arctic world. Oxford University Press. doi:10.1093/oso/9780192807304.001.0001
- Mills, W. J. (2003). Exploring polar frontiers: A historical encyclopedia (2 vols.). ABC-CLIO. doi:10.5040/9798400649110
- Nuttall, M. (Ed.). (2004). Encyclopedia of the Arctic (3 vols.). Routledge. doi:10.4324/9780203997857
- Vaughan, R. (1994). The Arctic: A history. Alan Sutton.

== Indigenous peoples ==
- Bennett, J., & Rowley, S. (Eds.). (2004). Uqalurait: An oral history of Nunavut. McGill-Queen's University Press. doi:10.1515/9780773570061
- Brody, H. (1975). The people's land: Eskimos and whites in the eastern Arctic. Penguin.
- Burch, E. S., Jr. (1998). The Iñupiaq Eskimo nations of northwest Alaska. University of Alaska Press.
- Burch, E. S., Jr. (2005). Alliance and conflict: The world system of the Iñupiaq Eskimos. University of Calgary Press. doi:10.1515/9781552382806
- Damas, D. (2002). Arctic migrants/Arctic villagers: The transformation of Inuit settlement in the central Arctic. McGill-Queen's University Press. doi:10.1515/9780773570412
- Damas, D. (Ed.). (1984). Handbook of North American Indians: Vol. 5. Arctic. Smithsonian Institution.
- Eber, D. H. (1989). When the whalers were up North: Inuit memories from the eastern Arctic. McGill-Queen's University Press. doi:10.1515/9780773562042
- Eber, D. H. (2008). Encounters on the Passage: Inuit meet the explorers. University of Toronto Press. doi:10.3138/9781442687981
- Fitzhugh, W. W., & Crowell, A. (Eds.). (1988). Crossroads of continents: Cultures of Siberia and Alaska. Smithsonian Institution Press.
- Fossett, R. (2001). In order to live untroubled: Inuit of the central Arctic, 1550 to 1940. University of Manitoba Press. doi:10.1515/9780887553288
- Friesen, T. M., & Mason, O. K. (Eds.). (2016). The Oxford handbook of the prehistoric Arctic. Oxford University Press. doi:10.1093/oxfordhb/9780199766956.001.0001
- Krupnik, I. (1993). Arctic adaptations: Native whalers and reindeer herders of northern Eurasia (M. Levenson, Trans. & Ed.). University Press of New England. doi:10.1349/ddlp.781
- Krupnik, I., & Jolly, D. (Eds.). (2002). The earth is faster now: Indigenous observations of Arctic environmental change. Arctic Research Consortium of the United States.
- Kulchyski, P., & Tester, F. J. (2007). Kiumajut (talking back): Game management and Inuit rights, 1900–70. UBC Press. doi:10.59962/9780774855525
- Laugrand, F. B., & Oosten, J. G. (2010). Inuit shamanism and Christianity: Transitions and transformations in the twentieth century. McGill-Queen's University Press. doi:10.1515/9780773576360
- McGhee, R. (1996). Ancient people of the Arctic. UBC Press.
- Mitchell, M. (1996). From talking chiefs to a native corporate elite: The birth of class and nationalism among Canadian Inuit. McGill-Queen's University Press. JSTOR j.ctt806bn
- Nuttall, M. (1992). Arctic homeland: Kinship, community and development in northwest Greenland. University of Toronto Press.
- Oswalt, W. H. (1979). Eskimos and explorers. Chandler & Sharp.
- Stern, P. R. (2004). Historical dictionary of the Inuit. Scarecrow Press.
- Wachowich, N., Awa, A. A., Katsak, R. K., & Katsak, S. P. (1999). Saqiyuq: Stories from the lives of three Inuit women. McGill-Queen's University Press.
- Woodman, D. C. (1991). Unravelling the Franklin mystery: Inuit testimony. McGill-Queen's University Press. doi:10.1515/9780773562899

== Exploration ==
- Beattie, O., & Geiger, J. (1987). Frozen in time: Unlocking the secrets of the Franklin expedition. Western Producer Prairie Books.
- Berton, P. (1988). The Arctic grail: The quest for the North West Passage and the North Pole, 1818–1909. McClelland and Stewart.
- Bloom, L. (1993). Gender on ice: American ideologies of polar expeditions. University of Minnesota Press. doi:10.5749/9780816684403
- Blum, H. (2019). The news at the ends of the earth: The print culture of polar exploration. Duke University Press. doi:10.1215/9781478004486
- Brandt, A. (2010). The man who ate his boots: The tragic history of the search for the Northwest Passage. Alfred A. Knopf.
- Capelotti, P. J. (2016). The greatest show in the Arctic: The American exploration of Franz Josef Land, 1898–1905. University of Oklahoma Press.
- Cavell, J. (2008). Tracing the connected narrative: Arctic exploration in British print culture, 1818–1860. University of Toronto Press. doi:10.3138/9781442689466
- Cookman, S. (2000). Ice blink: The tragic fate of Sir John Franklin's lost polar expedition. John Wiley.
- Craciun, A. (2016). Writing Arctic disaster: Authorship and exploration. Cambridge University Press. doi:10.1017/cbo9781316410790
- Cyriax, R. J. (1939). Sir John Franklin's last Arctic expedition: A chapter in the history of the Royal Navy. Methuen.
- David, R. G. (2000). The Arctic in the British imagination, 1818–1914. Manchester University Press. doi:10.7765/9781526121509
- Delgado, J. P. (1999). Across the top of the world: The quest for the Northwest Passage. Douglas & McIntyre.
- Eber, D. H. (2008). Encounters on the Passage: Inuit meet the explorers. University of Toronto Press. doi:10.3138/9781442687981
- Fleming, F. (1998). Barrow's boys. Granta.
- Fleming, F. (2001). Ninety degrees north: The quest for the North Pole. Granta.
- Fogelson, N. (1992). Arctic exploration & international relations, 1900–1932. University of Alaska Press.
- Henderson, B. (2005). True north: Peary, Cook, and the race to the Pole. W. W. Norton.
- Hill, J. (2008). White horizon: The Arctic in the nineteenth-century British imagination. State University of New York Press. doi:10.1515/9780791479469
- McCorristine, S. (2018). The spectral Arctic: A history of dreams and ghosts in polar exploration. UCL Press.
- McGhee, R. (2001). The Arctic voyages of Martin Frobisher: An Elizabethan adventure. McGill-Queen's University Press. doi:10.1515/9780773569508
- Niven, J. (2000). The ice master: The doomed 1913 voyage of the Karluk and the miraculous rescue of her survivors. Hyperion.
- Officer, C., & Page, J. (2001). A fabulous kingdom: The exploration of the Arctic. Oxford University Press. doi:10.1093/acprof:osobl/9780199837809.001.0001
- Potter, R. A. (2007). Arctic spectacles: The frozen North in visual culture, 1818–1875. University of Washington Press.
- Potter, R. A. (2016). Finding Franklin: The untold story of a 165-year search. McGill-Queen's University Press. doi:10.1515/9780773599611
- Riffenburgh, B. (1993). The myth of the explorer: The press, sensationalism, and geographical discovery. Belhaven Press.
- Robinson, M. F. (2006). The coldest crucible: Arctic exploration and American culture. University of Chicago Press. doi:10.7208/chicago/9780226721873.001.0001
- Savours, A. (1999). The search for the North West Passage. St. Martin's Press.
- Spufford, F. (1996). I may be some time: Ice and the English imagination. Faber & Faber.
- Williams, G. (2003). Voyages of delusion: The quest for the Northwest Passage. Yale University Press.
- Wilson, E. G. (2003). The spiritual history of ice: Romanticism, science, and the imagination (ch. "The poles", pp. 139–215). Palgrave Macmillan. doi:10.1057/9781403981806
- Woodman, D. C. (1991). Unravelling the Franklin mystery: Inuit testimony. McGill-Queen's University Press. doi:10.1515/9780773562899

== Regions ==
=== Russian and Soviet arctic ===
- Anderson, D. G. (2000). Identity and ecology in Arctic Siberia: The Number One Reindeer Brigade. Oxford University Press. doi:10.1093/oso/9780198233855.001.0001
- Armstrong, T. (1952). The northern sea route: Soviet exploitation of the North East Passage. Cambridge University Press.
- Bloch, A. (2004). Red ties and residential schools: Indigenous Siberians in a post-Soviet state. University of Pennsylvania Press. doi:10.9783/9780812293623
- Bobrick, B. (1992). East of the sun: The epic conquest and tragic history of Siberia. Poseidon Press.
- Bruno, A. (2016). The nature of Soviet power: An Arctic environmental history. Cambridge University Press. doi:10.1017/cbo9781316534762
- Forsyth, J. (1992). A history of the peoples of Siberia: Russia's north Asian colony, 1581–1990. Cambridge University Press.
- Grant, B. (1995). In the Soviet house of culture: A century of perestroikas. Princeton University Press. doi:10.1515/9780691219707
- Gray, P. A. (2005). The predicament of Chukotka's indigenous movement: Post-Soviet activism in the Russian far north. Cambridge University Press.
- Habeck, J. O. (2005). What it means to be a herdsman: The practice and image of reindeer husbandry among the Komi of northern Russia. LIT Verlag. doi:10.52038/978-38258-8045-1
- Hønneland, G. (2014). Arctic politics, the law of the sea and Russian identity: The Barents Sea delimitation agreement in Russian public debate. Palgrave Macmillan. doi:10.1057/9781137414069
- Horensma, P. (1991). The Soviet Arctic. Routledge. doi:10.4324/9780203168066
- Josephson, P. R. (2014). The conquest of the Russian Arctic. Harvard University Press. doi:10.4159/harvard.9780674419827
- Kotkin, S., & Wolff, D. (Eds.). (1995). Rediscovering Russia in Asia: Siberia and the Russian Far East. M. E. Sharpe.
- Laruelle, M. (2014). Russia's Arctic strategies and the future of the far North. M. E. Sharpe.
- Lincoln, W. B. (1993). The conquest of a continent: Siberia and the Russians. Random House.
- McCannon, J. (1998). Red Arctic: Polar exploration and the myth of the North in the Soviet Union, 1932–1939. Oxford University Press. doi:10.1093/oso/9780195114362.001.0001
- Slezkine, Y. (1994). Arctic mirrors: Russia and the small peoples of the North. Cornell University Press. doi:10.7591/9781501703317
- Stammler, F. (2005). Reindeer nomads meet the market: Culture, property and globalisation at the 'end of the land'. LIT Verlag. doi:10.52038/978-38258-8046-1
- Vitebsky, P. (2005). Reindeer people: Living with animals and spirits in Siberia. HarperCollins.
- Wood, A. (2011). Russia's frozen frontier: A history of Siberia and the Russian Far East, 1581–1991. Bloomsbury.
- Ziker, J. P. (2002). Peoples of the tundra: Northern Siberians in the post-communist transition. Waveland Press.

=== Scandinavian Arctic ===
- Avango, D., Hacquebord, L., Aalders, Y., De Haas, H., Gustafsson, U., & Kruse, F. (2011). Between markets and geo-politics: Natural resource exploitation on Spitsbergen from 1600 to the present day. Polar Record, 47(1), 29–39. doi:10.1017/s0032247410000069
- Bravo, M., & Sörlin, S. (Eds.). (2002). Narrating the Arctic: A cultural history of Nordic scientific practices. Science History Publications.
- Broadbent, N. D. (2010). Lapps and labyrinths: Saami prehistory, colonization, and cultural resilience. Smithsonian Institution Scholarly Press.
- Dahl, J. (2000). Saqqaq: An Inuit hunting community in the modern world. University of Toronto Press. doi:10.3138/9781442679573
- Fitzhugh, W. W., & Ward, E. I. (Eds.). (2000). Vikings: The North Atlantic saga. Smithsonian Institution Press.
- Fur, G. (2006). Colonialism in the margins: Cultural encounters in New Sweden and Lapland. Brill. doi:10.1163/9789047410652
- Gad, F. (1971). The history of Greenland: Vol. 1. Earliest times to 1700 (E. Dupont, Trans.). McGill-Queen's University Press. doi:10.1515/9780773592858 (Original work published 1967)
- Gad, F. (1973). The history of Greenland: Vol. 2. 1700–1782. McGill-Queen's University Press. doi:10.1515/9780773592865
- Hacquebord, L., & Avango, D. (2009). Settlements in an Arctic resource frontier region. Arctic Anthropology, 46(1–2), 25–39. doi:10.1353/arc.0.0028
- Hansen, L. I., & Olsen, B. (2014). Hunters in transition: An outline of early Sámi history. Brill. doi:10.1163/9789004252554
- Kent, N. (2014). The Sámi peoples of the North: A social and cultural history. Hurst.
- Kruse, F. (2014). Frozen assets: British mining, exploration, and geopolitics on Spitsbergen, 1904–53. Barkhuis. JSTOR j.ctv13nb6hq
- Lehtola, V.-P. (2004). The Sámi people: Traditions in transition (L. Weber Müller-Wille, Trans.). University of Alaska Press. (Original work published 1997)
- Paine, R. (1994). Herds of the tundra: A portrait of Saami reindeer pastoralism. Smithsonian Institution Press.
- Rud, S. (2017). Colonialism in Greenland: Tradition, governance and legacy. Springer. doi:10.1007/978-3-319-46158-8
- Seaver, K. A. (1996). The frozen echo: Greenland and the exploration of North America, ca. A.D. 1000–1500. Stanford University Press. doi:10.1515/9781503615731
- Seaver, K. A. (2010). The last Vikings: The epic story of the great Norse voyagers. I. B. Tauris.
- Sejersen, F. (2015). Rethinking Greenland and the Arctic in the era of climate change: New northern horizons. Routledge. doi:10.4324/9781315728308
- Sörlin, S. (Ed.). (2013). Science, geopolitics and culture in the polar region: Norden beyond borders. Ashgate.

=== North American Arctic ===
- Cameron, E. (2015). Far off metal river: Inuit lands, settler stories, and the making of the contemporary Arctic. UBC Press. doi:10.59962/9780774828864
- Cavell, J., & Noakes, J. (2010). Acts of occupation: Canada and Arctic sovereignty, 1918–25. UBC Press. doi:10.59962/9780774818698
- Coates, K. (1985). Canada's colonies: A history of the Yukon and Northwest Territories. J. Lorimer.
- Coates, K. S., & Morrison, W. R. (1988). Land of the midnight sun: A history of the Yukon. Hurtig.
- Coates, K. S., Lackenbauer, P. W., Morrison, W. R., & Poelzer, G. (2008). Arctic front: Defending Canada in the far North. Thomas Allen.
- Dick, L. (2001). Muskox land: Ellesmere Island in the age of contact. University of Calgary Press. doi:10.1515/9781552384121
- Elliot-Meisel, E. B. (1998). Arctic diplomacy: Canada and the United States in the Northwest Passage. Peter Lang.
- Farish, M. (2013). The lab and the land: Overcoming the Arctic in Cold War Alaska. Isis, 104(1), 1–29. doi:10.1086/669881
- Grant, S. D. (1988). Sovereignty or security? Government policy in the Canadian North, 1936–1950. UBC Press. doi:10.59962/9780774854030
- Grant, S. D. (2010). Polar imperative: A history of Arctic sovereignty in North America. Douglas & McIntyre.
- Haycox, S. W. (2002). Alaska: An American colony. University of Washington Press. doi:10.1515/9780295746876
- Kulchyski, P., & Tester, F. J. (2007). Kiumajut (talking back): Game management and Inuit rights, 1900–70. UBC Press. doi:10.59962/9780774855525
- Lackenbauer, P. W., & Farish, M. (2007). The Cold War on Canadian soil: Militarizing a northern environment. Environmental History, 12(4), 920–950. doi:10.1093/envhis/12.4.920
- Marcus, A. R. (1995). Relocating Eden: The image and politics of Inuit exile in the Canadian Arctic. University Press of New England. doi:10.1349/ddlp.772
- McGrath, M. (2007). The long exile: A tale of Inuit betrayal and survival in the High Arctic. Alfred A. Knopf.
- Morrison, W. R. (1985). Showing the flag: The Mounted Police and Canadian sovereignty in the north, 1894–1925. UBC Press. doi:10.59962/9780774857536
- Morrison, W. R. (1998). True North: The Yukon and Northwest Territories. Oxford University Press.
- Naske, C.-M., & Slotnick, H. E. (1979). Alaska: A history of the 49th state. Eerdmans.
- Sandlos, J. (2007). Hunters at the margin: Native people and wildlife conservation in the Northwest Territories. UBC Press. doi:10.59962/9780774855884
- Stuhl, A. (2016). Unfreezing the Arctic: Science, colonialism, and the transformation of Inuit lands. University of Chicago Press. doi:10.7208/chicago/9780226416786.001.0001
- Tester, F. J., & Kulchyski, P. (1994). Tammarniit (mistakes): Inuit relocation in the Eastern Arctic, 1939–63. UBC Press. doi:10.59962/9780774854795
- Zaslow, M. (1988). The northward expansion of Canada, 1914–1967. McClelland and Stewart.

== Whaling and the fur trade ==
- Avango, D., Hacquebord, L., & Wråkberg, U. (2014). Industrial extraction of Arctic natural resources since the sixteenth century: Technoscience and geo-economics in the history of northern whaling and mining. Journal of Historical Geography, 44, 15–30. doi:10.1016/j.jhg.2014.01.001
- Black, L. T. (2004). Russians in Alaska, 1732–1867. University of Alaska Press.
- Bockstoce, J. R. (1986). Whales, ice, and men: The history of whaling in the western Arctic. University of Washington Press.
- Bockstoce, J. R. (2009). Furs and frontiers in the far North: The contest among native and foreign nations for the Bering Strait fur trade. Yale University Press. doi:10.12987/9780300154900
- Bockstoce, J. R. (2018). White fox and icy seas in the western Arctic: The fur trade, transportation, and change in the early twentieth century. Yale University Press. doi:10.12987/yale/9780300221794.001.0001
- Demuth, B. (2019). Floating coast: An environmental history of the Bering Strait. W. W. Norton.
- Fisher, R. H. (1943). The Russian fur trade, 1550–1700. University of California Press.
- Francis, D. (1990). A history of world whaling. Viking.
- Hacquebord, L. (Ed.). (2012). LASHIPA: History of large scale resource exploitation in polar areas. Barkhuis. JSTOR j.ctt13wwxkn
- Jackson, G. (1978). The British whaling trade. A. and C. Black.
- Jones, R. T. (2014). Empire of extinction: Russians and the North Pacific's strange beasts of the sea, 1741–1867. Oxford University Press. doi:10.1093/acprof:oso/9780199343416.001.0001
- Lubbock, B. (1937). The Arctic whalers. Brown, Son & Ferguson.
- Ray, A. J. (1990). The Canadian fur trade in the industrial age. University of Toronto Press. doi:10.3138/9781442657403
- Ross, W. G. (1975). Whaling and Eskimos: Hudson Bay 1860–1915. National Museums of Canada.
- Ross, W. G. (1985). Arctic whalers, icy seas: Narratives of the Davis Strait whale fishery. Irwin.
- Ross, W. G. (Ed.). (1997). This distant and unsurveyed country: A woman's winter at Baffin Island, 1857–1858. McGill-Queen's University Press. doi:10.1515/9780773566927
- Sanger, C. W. (2016). Scottish Arctic whaling. Birlinn.
- Tønnessen, J. N., & Johnsen, A. O. (1982). The history of modern whaling (R. I. Christophersen, Trans.). University of California Press. doi:10.1525/9780520418752 (Original work published 1959)
- Vinkovetsky, I. (2011). Russian America: An overseas colony of a continental empire, 1804–1867. Oxford University Press. doi:10.1093/acprof:oso/9780195391282.001.0001

== Arctic geopolitics ==
- Archer, C., & Scrivener, D. (Eds.). (1986). Northern waters: Security and resource issues. Croom Helm.
- Brady, A.-M. (2017). China as a polar great power. Cambridge University Press. doi:10.1017/9781316832004
- Byers, M. (2010). Who owns the Arctic? Understanding sovereignty disputes in the North. Douglas & McIntyre.
- Byers, M. (2013). International law and the Arctic. Cambridge University Press. doi:10.1017/cbo9781107337442
- Dodds, K., & Nuttall, M. (2016). The scramble for the poles: The geopolitics of the Arctic and Antarctic. Polity Press.
- Elliot-Meisel, E. B. (1998). Arctic diplomacy: Canada and the United States in the Northwest Passage. Peter Lang.
- Emmerson, C. (2010). The future history of the Arctic. PublicAffairs.
- English, J. (2013). Ice and water: Politics, peoples, and the Arctic Council. Allen Lane.
- Grant, S. D. (2010). Polar imperative: A history of Arctic sovereignty in North America. Douglas & McIntyre.
- Hønneland, G. (2014). Arctic politics, the law of the sea and Russian identity: The Barents Sea delimitation agreement in Russian public debate. Palgrave Macmillan. doi:10.1057/9781137414069
- Keskitalo, E. C. H. (2004). Negotiating the Arctic: The construction of an international region. Routledge. doi:10.4324/9780203508114
- Kraska, J. (Ed.). (2011). Arctic security in an age of climate change. Cambridge University Press. doi:10.1017/cbo9780511994784
- Lajeunesse, A. (2016). Lock, stock, and icebergs: A history of Canada's Arctic maritime sovereignty. UBC Press. doi:10.59962/9780774831109
- Laruelle, M. (2014). Russia's Arctic strategies and the future of the far North. M. E. Sharpe.
- Osherenko, G., & Young, O. R. (1989). The age of the Arctic: Hot conflicts and cold realities. Cambridge University Press.
- Pharand, D. (1988). Canada's Arctic waters in international law. Cambridge University Press. doi:10.1017/cbo9780511565458
- Powell, R. C., & Dodds, K. (Eds.). (2014). Polar geopolitics? Knowledges, resources and legal regimes. Edward Elgar. doi:10.4337/9781781009413
- Rothwell, D. R. (1996). The polar regions and the development of international law. Cambridge University Press.
- Shadian, J. M. (2014). The politics of Arctic sovereignty: Oil, ice, and Inuit governance. Routledge. doi:10.4324/9781315851419
- Steinberg, P. E., Tasch, J., Gerhardt, H., Keul, A., & Nyman, E. A. (2015). Contesting the Arctic: Politics and imaginaries in the circumpolar North. I. B. Tauris. doi:10.5040/9780755619917
- Stokke, O. S., & Hønneland, G. (Eds.). (2006). International cooperation and Arctic governance: Regime effectiveness and northern region building. Routledge. doi:10.4324/9780203962336
- Tamnes, R., & Offerdal, K. (Eds.). (2014). Geopolitics and security in the Arctic: Regional dynamics in a global world. Routledge. doi:10.4324/9781315813455
- Young, O. R. (1992). Arctic politics: Conflict and cooperation in the circumpolar North. University Press of New England. doi:10.1349/ddlp.779
- Young, O. R. (1998). Creating regimes: Arctic accords and international governance. Cornell University Press. doi:10.7591/9781501711411

== Military history and the Cold War ==
- Coates, K. S., Lackenbauer, P. W., Morrison, W. R., & Poelzer, G. (2008). Arctic front: Defending Canada in the far North. Thomas Allen.
- Farish, M. (2013). The lab and the land: Overcoming the Arctic in Cold War Alaska. Isis, 104(1), 1–29. doi:10.1086/669881
- Grant, S. D. (1988). Sovereignty or security? Government policy in the Canadian North, 1936–1950. UBC Press. doi:10.59962/9780774854030
- Heidt, D., & Lackenbauer, P. W. (2022). The Joint Arctic Weather Stations: Science and sovereignty in the High Arctic, 1946–1972. University of Calgary Press. doi:10.1515/9781773852591
- Kohlhoff, D. W. (2002). Amchitka and the bomb: Nuclear testing in Alaska. University of Washington Press. doi:10.1515/9780295800509
- Lackenbauer, P. W., & Farish, M. (2007). The Cold War on Canadian soil: Militarizing a northern environment. Environmental History, 12(4), 920–950. doi:10.1093/envhis/12.4.920
- Lackenbauer, P. W. (2013). The Canadian Rangers: A living history. UBC Press. doi:10.59962/9780774824545
- Leary, W. M. (1999). Under ice: Waldo Lyon and the development of the Arctic submarine. Texas A&M University Press.
- Morenus, R. (1957). DEW Line: Distant early warning, the miracle of America's first line of defense. Rand McNally.
- Nielsen, K. H., & Nielsen, H. (2021). Camp Century: The untold story of America's secret Arctic military base under the Greenland ice. Columbia University Press. doi:10.7312/niel20176
- Petersen, N. (2008). The iceman that never came: 'Project Iceworm', the search for a NATO deterrent, and Denmark, 1960–1962. Scandinavian Journal of History, 33(1), 75–98. doi:10.1080/03468750701449554

== Biographies ==
- Bown, S. R. (2012). The last Viking: The life of Roald Amundsen. Da Capo Press.
- Bryce, R. M. (1997). Cook & Peary: The polar controversy, resolved. Stackpole Books.
- Counter, S. A. (1991). North Pole legacy: Black, white & Eskimo. University of Massachusetts Press.
- Diubaldo, R. J. (1978). Stefansson and the Canadian Arctic. McGill-Queen's University Press. doi:10.1515/9780773567627
- Frost, O. W. (2003). Bering: The Russian discovery of America. Yale University Press.
- Harper, K. (2000). Give me my father's body: The life of Minik, the New York Eskimo. Steerforth Press.
- Herbert, W. (1989). The noose of laurels: The discovery of the North Pole. Hodder & Stoughton.
- Huntford, R. (1997). Nansen: The explorer as hero. Duckworth.
- Jenness, S. E. (2011). Stefansson, Dr. Anderson and the Canadian Arctic Expedition, 1913–1918: A story of exploration, science and sovereignty. Canadian Museum of History. JSTOR j.ctt22zmd3c
- McGoogan, K. (2001). Fatal passage: The untold story of John Rae, the Arctic adventurer who discovered the fate of Franklin. HarperFlamingo Canada.
- McGoogan, K. (2003). Ancient mariner: The amazing adventures of Samuel Hearne, the sailor who walked to the Arctic Ocean. HarperFlamingo Canada.
- McGoogan, K. (2005). Lady Franklin's revenge: A true story of ambition, obsession and the remaking of Arctic history. HarperCollins.
- Niven, J. (2003). Ada Blackjack: A true story of survival in the Arctic. Hyperion.
- Pálsson, G. (2005). Travelling passions: The hidden life of Vilhjalmur Stefansson (K. Kunz, Trans.). University of Manitoba Press. doi:10.1515/9780887553905
- Ross, M. J. (1994). Polar pioneers: John Ross and James Clark Ross. McGill-Queen's University Press. doi:10.1515/9780773565036
- Weems, J. E. (1967). Peary: The explorer and the man. Houghton Mifflin.

== Historiography ==
- Abel, K., & Coates, K. (Eds.). (2001). Northern visions: New perspectives on the North in Canadian history. University of Toronto Press. doi:10.3138/9781442602779
- Craciun, A. (2010). The frozen ocean. PMLA, 125(3), 693–702. doi:10.1632/pmla.2010.125.3.693
- Dodds, K., & Powell, R. (2013). Polar geopolitics: New researchers on the polar regions. The Polar Journal, 3(1), 1–8. doi:10.1080/2154896x.2013.809920
- Doel, R. E., Wråkberg, U., & Zeller, S. (2014). Science, environment, and the New Arctic. Journal of Historical Geography, 44, 2–14. doi:10.1016/j.jhg.2013.12.003
- Grace, S. E. (2002). Canada and the idea of North. McGill-Queen's University Press. doi:10.1515/9780773569539
- Hulan, R. (2002). Northern experience and the myths of Canadian culture. McGill-Queen's University Press. doi:10.1515/9780773569447
- Roberts, P., & Howkins, A. (2023). Introduction: The problems of polar history. In A. Howkins & P. Roberts (Eds.), The Cambridge history of the polar regions (pp. 1–31). Cambridge University Press. doi:10.1017/9781108555654.001
- Ryall, A., Schimanski, J., & Wærp, H. H. (Eds.). (2010). Arctic discourses. Cambridge Scholars Publishing.

== Primary sources ==
- Amundsen, R. (1908). The North West Passage: Being the record of a voyage of exploration of the ship "Gjöa" 1903–1907 (2 vols.). Archibald Constable.
- Back, G. (1836). Narrative of the Arctic land expedition to the mouth of the Great Fish River, and along the shores of the Arctic Ocean, in the years 1833, 1834, and 1835. John Murray.
- Cook, F. A. (1911). My attainment of the Pole: Being the record of the expedition that first reached the boreal center, 1907–1909. Polar Publishing.
- De Long, G. W. (1884). The voyage of the Jeannette: The ship and ice journals of George W. De Long, lieutenant-commander U.S.N., and commander of the Polar expedition of 1879–1881 (E. De Long, Ed.; 2 vols.). Houghton Mifflin.
- Franklin, J. (1823). Narrative of a journey to the shores of the Polar Sea, in the years 1819, 20, 21, and 22. John Murray.
- Freuchen, P. (1935). Arctic adventure: My life in the frozen North. Farrar & Rinehart.
- Greely, A. W. (1886). Three years of Arctic service: An account of the Lady Franklin Bay Expedition of 1881–84 (2 vols.). Charles Scribner's Sons.
- Hall, C. F. (1865). Arctic researches, and life among the Esquimaux: Being the narrative of an expedition in search of Sir John Franklin, in the years 1860, 1861, and 1862. Harper & Brothers.
- Henson, M. A. (1912). A Negro explorer at the North Pole. Frederick A. Stokes.
- Kane, E. K. (1856). Arctic explorations: The second Grinnell expedition in search of Sir John Franklin, 1853, '54, '55 (2 vols.). Childs & Peterson.
- McClintock, F. L. (1859). The voyage of the 'Fox' in the Arctic seas: A narrative of the discovery of the fate of Sir John Franklin and his companions. John Murray.
- Nansen, F. (1897). Farthest north: Being the record of a voyage of exploration of the ship "Fram" 1893–96 (2 vols.). Harper & Brothers.
- Nordenskiöld, A. E. (1882). The voyage of the Vega round Asia and Europe: With a historical review of previous journeys along the north coast of the Old World (A. Leslie, Trans.). Macmillan.
- Parry, W. E. (1821). Journal of a voyage for the discovery of a north-west passage from the Atlantic to the Pacific: Performed in the years 1819–20, in His Majesty's ships Hecla and Griper. John Murray.
- Peary, R. E. (1910). The North Pole: Its discovery in 1909 under the auspices of the Peary Arctic Club. Frederick A. Stokes.
- Rasmussen, K. (1927). Across Arctic America: Narrative of the Fifth Thule Expedition. G. P. Putnam's Sons.
- Ross, J. (1835). Narrative of a second voyage in search of a north-west passage, and of a residence in the Arctic regions during the years 1829, 1830, 1831, 1832, 1833. A. W. Webster.
- Ross, W. G. (1985). Arctic whalers, icy seas: Narratives of the Davis Strait whale fishery. Irwin.
- Ross, W. G. (Ed.). (1997). This distant and unsurveyed country: A woman's winter at Baffin Island, 1857–1858. McGill-Queen's University Press. doi:10.1515/9780773566927
- Scoresby, W. (1820). An account of the Arctic regions, with a history and description of the northern whale-fishery (2 vols.). Archibald Constable.
- Stefansson, V. (1921). The friendly Arctic: The story of five years in polar regions. Macmillan.
- Sverdrup, O. (1904). New land: Four years in the Arctic regions (2 vols.). Longmans, Green.

== See also ==
- Arctic exploration
- Bibliography of Antarctica
- Bibliography of Canada
- Bibliography of Canadian history
- Bibliography of Greenland
- Bibliography of Russian history (1613–1917)
- Bibliography of Siberia
- Bibliography of the scientific history of the Arctic
- Bibliography of the Soviet Union
- Circumpolar peoples
- List of polar explorers
- Polar exploration
