= David L. Denlinger =

David L. Denlinger is an American entomologist known for his research on insect diapause, stress physiology, and adaptations to seasonal and extreme environments. He is distinguished university professor emeritus and Academy professor at The Ohio State University. He was elected to the United States National Academy of Sciences in 2004. He is a fellow of the American Association for the Advancement of Science, the Entomological Society of America, and the Royal Entomological Society of London.

== Education and early career ==
Denlinger earned a Bachelor of Science in Zoology from Pennsylvania State University in 1967 and a Ph.D. in Entomology from the University of Illinois at Urbana–Champaign in 1971. His doctoral research focused on insect developmental physiology.

== Academic career ==
From 1971 to 1972, he served as a research associate at the Agricultural University of Wageningen in the Netherlands in the laboratory of Jan de Wilde. He then worked as a research scientist at the International Centre of Insect Physiology and Ecology (ICIPE) in Nairobi, Kenya from 1972 to 1974.

From 1974 to 1976, he was a research associate at Harvard University, working in the laboratory of C. M. Williams.

Denlinger joined The Ohio State University in 1976 as an assistant professor of entomology. He was promoted to associate professor in 1980 and to professor in 1984. From 1994 to 2005, he served as Chair of the Department of Entomology.

In 2005, Denlinger was appointed Distinguished University Professor. He held this position until 2015, when he transitioned to Distinguished University Professor Emeritus status. Since 2016, he has served as an Academy Professor.

== Research ==
Denlinger's research focuses on insect survival under environmental stress, with particular emphasis on diapause, cold hardiness, and stress tolerance. He combines ecological, physiological, endocrine, molecular, and genomic approaches to study seasonal and extreme-environment adaptations.

A central theme of his work is the regulation of insect diapause, especially in flesh flies (Sarcophaga), which he has used as model organisms, as well as in agriculturally and medically important species such as tsetse flies and mosquitoes. His research has contributed to applications in pest management, disease vector control, and the understanding of biological timing mechanisms. His book Insect Diapause (2022) provides a synthesis of the field.

He has also investigated cold hardiness and stress physiology, including studies on the Antarctic midge (Belgica antarctica), the only insect native to Antarctica. His group reported that the species has an unusually compact genome lacking many noncoding and repetitive elements while retaining approximately 13,500 protein-coding genes, a feature proposed as an adaptation to extreme Antarctic conditions.

== Awards ==
Denlinger was elected to the National Academy of Sciences in 2004. He also awarded with the Founders’ Memorial Award of the Entomological Society of America, the Gregor Mendel Medal of the Czech Academy of Sciences, and the Antarctic Service Medal from the National Science Foundation. He is a Fellow of the American Association for the Advancement of Science, the Entomological Society of America, and the Royal Entomological Society of London.
