= Bibliography of Antarctica =

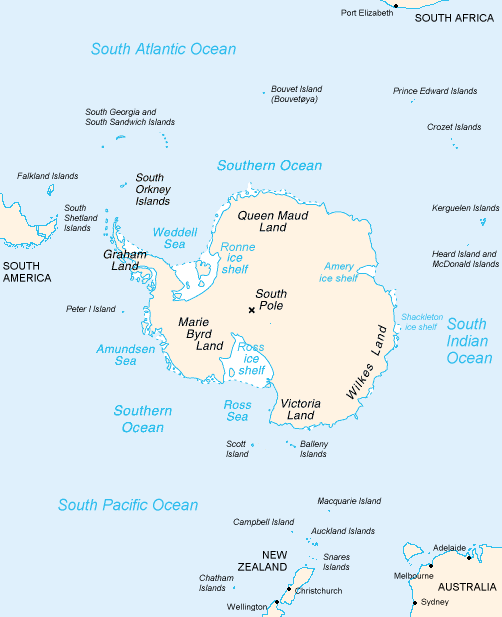
Antarctica

This article is a list of English-language nonfiction books which have been described by reliable sources as in some way directly relating to the subject of Antarctica, its history, geography, people, etc.

- Adie, Raymond J. - Antarctic Geology and Geophysics: Proceedings of a symposium, Oslo, Norway, August 1970.
- Alexander, Caroline - The Endurance: Shackleton's legendary Antarctic expedition.
- Amundsen, Roald - Race to the South Pole.
- Antarctica: Compiled from All Available Sources to 1943, Including the Results of All American Expeditions from the United States Exploring Expedition 1839–1841 to the United States Antarctic Service 1940–1941.
- Antarctica in the International Geophysical Year: Based on a Symposium on the Antarctic.
- Arnesen, Liv - No horizon is so far: two women and their extraordinary journey across Antarctica.
- Auburn, F. M. – Antarctic Law and Politics.
- Bancroft, Ann, Liv Arnesen, and Cheryl Dahle – No Horizon Is so Far: A Historic Journey across Antarctica.
- Barczewski, Stephanie L. - Antarctic destinies: Scott, Shackleton and the changing face of heroism.
- Baughman, T. H. - Before the Heroes Came: Antarctica in the 1890s.
- Beals, Herbert K. - Four Travel Journals: The Americas, Antarctica, and Africa.
- Behrendt, John C. - Innocents on the ice: a memoir of Antarctic exploration.
- Belanger, Dian Olson – Deep Freeze: The United States, the International Geophysical Year, and the Origins of Antarctica's Age of Science.
- The Belgian Expedition under the Command of A. de Gerlache de Gomery.
- Bertram, Colin - Antarctica, Cambridge, Conservation and Population: A Biologist's Story.
- Bertram, Colin – Antarctica Sixty Years Ago: A Re-Appraisal of the British Graham Land Expedition 1934–37.
- Bickel, Lennard - Mawson's will: the greatest polar survival story ever written.
- Bickel, Lennard - Shackleton's forgotten men: the untold tragedy of the endurance epic.
- Boggs, S. W. - The Polar Regions: Geographical and Historical Data for Consideration in a Study of Claims to Sovereignty in the Arctic and Antarctic Regions.
- Bohme, Rolf – Inventory of World Topographic Mapping. Volume 3: Eastern Europe, Asia, Oceania and Antarctica.
- Burke, David - Voyage to the end of the world: with tales from the great ice barrier.
- Burns, Robin - Just tell them I survived: women in Antarctica.
- Bush, W. M. - Antarctica and International Law: A Collection of Inter-state and National Documents.
- Byrd, Richard Evelyn - Alone: the classic polar adventure.
- Caesar, Adrian - The White: Last Days in the Antarctic Journeys of Scott and Mawson, 1911–1913.
- Cassidy, William A. – Meteorites, Ice, and Antarctica: A Personal Account.
- Charney, Jonathan I. - The New Nationalism and the Use of Common Spaces: Issues in Marine Pollution and the Exploration of Antarctica.
- Cherry-Garrard, Apsley - The Worst Journey in the World: Antarctic, 1910–1913.
- Chester, S. – A Wildlife Guide to Chile, Continental Chile, Chilean Antarctica, Easter Island, Juan Fernandez Archipelago.
- Child, Jack - Antarctica and South American Geopolitics: Frozen Lebensraum.
- Cokinos, Christopher - The Fallen Sky: An Intimate History of Shooting Stars.
- Collier, Graham - Antarctic odyssey: in the footsteps of the South Polar explorers.
- Copeland, Sebastian. Antarctica: The Global Warning.
- Cox, Lynne - Swimming to Antarctica: Tales of a Long-Distance Swimmer.
- Croizat, Leon - Manual of Plant-Geography or an Account of Plant-Dispersal throughout the World.
- De Witt, Maarten J. – Minerals and Mining in Antarctica: Science and Technology, Economics and Politics.
- Diski, Jenny - Skating to Antarctica: Skating to the End of the World.
- Does, Willem van der - Storms, ice, and whales: the Antarctic adventures of a Dutch artist on a Norwegian whaler.
- Ecklund, Carl R. and Joan Beckman - Antarctica: Polar Research and Discovery During the International Geophysical Year.
- Edholm, O. G. and E. K. E. Gunderson – Polar Human Biology: The Proceedings of the SCAR/IUPS/IUBS Symposium on Human Biology and Medicine in the Antarctic.
- English, Robert A. J. - Sailing Directions for Antarctica, Including the Off-Lying Islands South of Latitude 60 degrees.
- Ferguson, A. – Geological Observations in the South Shetlands, the Palmer Archipelago, and Graham Land, Antarctica.
- Fiennes, Ranulph - Captain Scott.
- Fiennes, Ranulph - Mind Over Matter: The Epic Crossing of the Antarctic Continent.
- Fiennes, Ranulph - Race to the Pole: tragedy, heroism, and Scott's Antarctic quest.
- Fox, Robert - Antarctica and the South Atlantic: Discovery, Development and Dispute.
- Fox, William L. - Terra Antarctica: Looking into the Emptiest Continent.
- Francioni, Francesco and Tullio Scovazzi – International Law for Antarctica.
- Fuchs, Arved - In Shackleton's wake.
- Geophysical Monograph No. 1. Antarctica in the I. G. Y.
- Giæver, John - The White Desert: The Norwegian-British-Swedish Antarctic Expedition.
- Gorman, James - Ocean enough and time: discovering the waters around Antarctica.
- Grattan, C. Hartley – The Southwest Pacific Since 1900. A Modern History: Australia, New Zealand, the Islands, Antarctica.
- Grattan, C. Hartley - The Southwest Pacific to 1900: A Modern History: Australian, New Zealand, the Islands, Antarctica.
- Green, Bill - Water, ice & stone: science and memory on the Antarctic lakes.
- Greene, Dorothy M. – A Conspectus of the Mosses of Antarctica, South Georgia, the Falkland Islands and Southern South America.
- Gressitt, J. L. - Entomology of Antarctica, Vol. 10, Antarctic Research Series.
- Griffiths, Tom - Slicing the silence: voyaging to Antarctica.
- Gunn, B. M. and Guyon Warren - Geology 4: Geology of Victoria Land between the Mawson and Mulock Glaciers, Antarctica.
- Gurney, Alan - Below the Convergence: Voyages Toward Antarctica, 1699–1839.
- Gurney, Alan - The race to the white continent.
- Hall, Lincoln - The Loneliest Mountain: the dramatic story of the first expedition to climb Mt Minto, Antarctica.
- Hanc, John - The coolest race on earth: mud, madmen, glaciers, and grannies at the Antarctica marathon.
- Harrison, Albert A. & Yvonne Clearwater - From Antarctica to Outer Space: Life in Isolation and Confinement.
- Hartman, Olga – Polychaeta Errantia of Antarctica. Volume 3, Antarctic Research Series.
- Hartman, Olga – Polychaeta Myzostomidae and Sedentarian of the Antarctica. Volume 7, Antarctic Research Series.
- Hartman, Olga – Polychaetous Annelids Collected by the USNS Eitanin and Staten Island Cruises Chiefly from Antarctic Seas. Allan Hancock Monographs in Biology, No. 2.
- Hayes, J. Gordon – Antarctica: A Treatise on the Southern Continent.
- Herzefeld, Ute Christina - Atlas of Antarctica: Topographic Maps from Geostatistical Analysis of Satellite Radar Altimeter Data.
- Higgins, P. J., J. M. Peter, and W. K. Steele – Handbook of Australian, New Zealand and Antarctic Birds. Volume 5 Tyrant-Flycatchers to Chats.
- Hisdal, V., O. A. Amble, and N. J. Schumacher – Norwegian-British-Swedish Antarctic Expedition, 1949–1952. Scientific Results: Vol. 1, Meteorology: Part 2, Surface Observations; Sub-Part 1, Air Pressure.
- Hobbs, William Herbert - The Discoveries of Antarctica within the American Sector, as Revealed by Maps and Documents.
- Holdgate, M. W. - Antarctic Ecology: Based on a symposium, Cambridge, England, 1968.
- Hooper, Meredith - The Ferocious Summer: Palmer's Penguins and the Warming of Antarctica. Alternatively published under the title: The Ferocious Summer: Adelie Penguins and the Warming of Antarctica.
- Huntford, Roland - The Last Place on Earth (aka Scott and Amundsen).
- Huntford, Roland - Shackleton.
- Husseiny, A. A. – Iceberg Utilization: Proceedings of the First International Conference and Workshops on Iceberg Utilization for Fresh Water Production, Weather Modification and Other Applications Held at Iowa State University, Ames, Iowa, USA, 2-6 Oct. 1977.
- Jacquet, Luc, photos by Jerome Maison, trans. by Donnali Fifield - March of the Penguins.
- Johnson, Nicholas - Big Dead Place: Inside the Strange and Menacing World of Antarctica.
- Johnson, Rebecca L. - Science on the Ice: An Antarctic Journal.
- Jones, A. G. E. – Antarctica Observed: Who Discovered the Antarctic Continent?
- Jones, Max - The last great quest: Captain Scott's Antarctic sacrifice.
- Joyner, Christopher C. and Sudhir K. Chopra - The Antarctic Legal Regime.
- Kearns, David A. - ''Where hell freezes over: a story of amazing bravery and survival.
- Kelly, Philip and Jack Child – Geopolitics of the Southern Cone and Antarctica.
- Kolbert, Elizabeth, ed. with Francis Spufford - The Ends of the Earth: An Anthology of the finest writing on the Arctic and the Antarctic.
- Landis, Marilyn J. - Antarctica: exploring the extreme: 400 years of adventure.
- Lansing, Alfred - Endurance: Shackleton's incredible voyage.
- Lee, Richard E., Jr. and David L. Denlinger - Insects at Low Temperature.
- Legler, Gretchen - On the Ice: An Intimate Portrait of Life at McMurdo Station, Antarctica.
- Liljequist, G. H. - Norwegian-British-Swedish Antarctic Expedition, 1949–1952. Scientific Results: Vol. II, Meteorology: Part 1, Energy Exchange of an Antarctic Snowfield, Sub-Part A, Short-Wave Radiation, 1956; Sub Part B, Long-Wave Radiation and Radiation Balance, 1956; Sub-Part C, Wind Structure in the Low Layer, 1957; Sub-Part D, Surface Inversions and Turbulent Heat Transfer, 1957.
- Liljequist, G. H. - Norwegian-British-Swedish Antarctic Expedition, 1949–1952. Scientific Results: Vol. II, Meteorology: Part 2, Special Studies. Sub-Part A, Halo-Phenomena and Ice Crystals.
- Lizotte, Michael and Kevin Arrigo – Antarctic Sea Ice: Biological Processes, Interactions and Variability, Antarctic Research Series, Vol. 73.
- Lorentsen, S.-H. - Reproductive Effort in the Antarctic Petrel Thalassoica Antarctica: The Effect of Parental Body Size and Condition.
- Lynch, Wayne - Penguins of the world.
- MacDowall, Joseph – On Floating Ice: Two Years on an Antarctic Ice-Shelf.
- Mastro, Jim, with Norbert Wu - Under Antarctic Ice: The Photographs of Norbert Wu.
- Mathews, Eleanor - Ambassador to the penguins: a naturalist's year aboard a yankee whaleship.
- Matthiessen, Peter - End of the Earth: Voyages to Antarctica.
- Mawson, Douglas, Sir - The Home of the Blizzard: A True Story of Antarctic Survival.
- McGonigal, David - Antarctica: Secrets of the Southern Continent.
- McSween, Harry Y. - Meteorites and Their Parent Planets.
- Mercy, David - Berserk: my voyage to Antarctica in a twenty-seven-foot sailboat.
- Moorehead, Alan - The Fatal Impact: An Account of the Invasion of the South Pacific, 1767–1840.
- Morris, Michael M. – Great Power Reliations in Argentina, Chile and Antarctica.
- Murphy, Joseph E. - South to the Pole by ski: nine men and two women pioneer a new route to the South Pole.
- Murphy, Robert Cushman – Oceanic Birds of South America. A Study of Species of the Related Coasts and Seas, Including the American Quadrant of Antarctica Based Upon the Brewster-Sanford Collection in the American Museum of Natural History:Volumes I and II.
- Myers, Joan - Wondrous cold: an Antarctic journey.
- Myhre, Jeffrey D. – The Antarctic Treaty System: Politics, Law and Diplomacy.
- Naveen, Ron - Waiting to fly: my escapades with the penguins of Antarctica.
- Nicoll, Alastair Vere -Riding the Ice Wind: By Kite and Sledge Across Antarctica.
- Norsenskjold, N. Otto G. and Joh. Gunnar Andersson – Antarctica, or Two Years amongst the Ice of the South Pole.
- Ochyra, Ryszard - The illustrated moss flora of Antarctica.
- Ochyra, Ryszard - The Moss Flora of King George Island, Antarctica.
- Ovstedal, DO and RI Lewis Smith – Lichens of Antarctica and South Georgia: A Guide to Their Identification and Ecology.
- Parker, Bruce C. – Proceedings of the Colloquium on Conservation Problems in Antarctica. Blackburg, Va., Sept. 1971.
- Parsons, Anthony – Antarctica: The Next Decade: Report of a Study Group.
- Patterson, Diana - The ice beneath my feet: my year in Antarctica.
- Peterson, M. J. – Managing the Frozen South: The Creation and Evolution of the Antarctic Treaty System.
- Philbrick, Nathaniel - Sea of Glory: America's voyage of discovery: the U. S. Exploring Expedition, 1838–1842.
- Plimpton, George - Ernest Shackleton.
- Polar Research Board – Antarctic Treaty System: An Assessment. Proceedings of a Workshop Held at Beardmore South Field Camp, Antarctica, January 7–13, 1985.
- Price, A. Grenfell – The Winning of Australian Antarctica: Mawson's B.A.N.Z.A.R.E. Voyages 1929-1931: Based on the Mawson Papers.
- Priestley, Raymond, Raymond J. Adie and G. de Q. Robin - Antarctic Research: A Review of British Scientific Achievement in Antarctica.
- Priscu, John C. – Ecosystems Dynamics in a Polar Desert: The McMurdo Dry Valleys, Antarctic research Series, Vol. 72.
- Pyne, Stephen J. – The Ice: A Journey to Antarctica.
- Quam, Louis O. & Horace D. Porter - Research in the Antarctic: A symposium, Dallas, Texas, Dec. 1968.
- Quartermain, L. B. - South to the Pole: The Early History of the Ross Sea Sector, Antarctica.
- Quigg, Philip W. - A Pole Apart: The Emerging Issue of Antarctica.
- Riffenburgh, Beau, ed. - Encyclopedia of the Antarctic.
- Riffenburgh, Beau - Shackleton's forgotten expedition: the voyage of the Nimrod.
- Roberts, Leslie Carol - The Entire Earth and Sky: Views on Antarctica.
- Robertson, Hugh and Barrie Heather – The Hand Guide to the Birds of New Zealand.
- Rodgers, Eugene - Beyond the Barrier: The Story of Byrd's First Expedition to Antarctica.
- Rose, Lisle A. – Assault on Eternity: Richard E. Byrd and the Exploration of Antarctica, 1946–47.
- Rosove, Michael H. - Let heroes speak: Antarctic explorers, 1772–1922.
- Ross, M. J. – Ross in the Antarctic: The Voyages of James Clark Ross in Her Majesty's Ships ‘’Erebus’’ and ‘’Terror’’ 1839–1843.
- Rudmose-Brown, R. N. – The Polar Regions: A Physical and Economic Geography of the Arctic and Antarctic.
- Sanderson, Marie - Griffith Taylor: Antarctic Scientist and Pioneer Geographer.
- Schytt, V. - Snow and Ice Studies in Antarctica: Norwegian-British-Swedish Antarctic Expedition, 1949–52.
- Science in Antarctica: A Report by the Committee on Polar Research.
- Scott, Jonathan and Angela Scott - Antarctica: Exploring a Fragile Eden.
- Scott, Robert Falcon - Journals: Captain Scott's last expedition.
- Scott, Robert Falcon - Scott's last expedition: the journals.
- Scott, Robert Falcon - The Voyage of the Discovery.
- Shackleton, Ernest Henry - Escape from the Antarctic.
- Shackleton, Ernest Henry - The heart of the Antarctic: being the story of the British Antarctic Expedition, 1907–1909.
- Shackleton, Ernest Henry - Shackleton, his Antarctic writings.
- Shackleton, Ernest Henry - South: the Endurance expedition.
- Shackleton, Jonathan - Shackleton: an Irishman in Antarctica.
- Shapiro, Deborah - Time on ice: a winter voyage to Antarctica.
- Shirihai, Hadoram - The Complete Guide to Antarctic Wildlife: birds and marine mammals of the Antarctic continent and the Southern Ocean, 2nd ed.
- Shulman, Neville - Some Like It Cold: Arctic and Antarctic expeditions.
- Simpson, George Gaylord – Splendid Isolation.
- Simpson, Ken, Nicholas Day, and Peter Trusler - Birds of Antarctica.
- Simpson-Housley, Paul - Antarctica: Exploration, Perception, and Metaphor.
- Smith, Michael - Tom Cream: unsung hero of the Scott and Shackleton Antarctic expeditions.
- Smith, Roff Martin - Life on the Ice: No One Goes to Antarctica Alone.
- Solomon, Susan - The Coldest March: Scott's Fatal Antarctic Expedition.
- The South Pole: a historical reader.
- Spufford, Francis - I May Be Some Time: Ice and the English Imagination.
- Stokke, Olav Schram and Davor Vidas – Governing the Antarctic: The Effectiveness and Legitimacy of the Antarctic Treaty System.
- Stone, Greg - Ice island: the expedition to Antarctica's largest iceberg.
- Stroud, Mike - Shadows on the Wasteland.
- Suggate, L. S. - Australia and New Zealand, with Pacific Islands and Antarctica.
- Swan, Robert - Antarctica 2041: My Quest to Save the Earth's Last Wilderness.
- Swithinbank, Charles – An Alien in Antarctica: Reflections upon Forty Years of Exploration and Research on the Frozen Continent.
- Swithinbank, Charles – Foothold on Antarctica: The First International Expedition (1949–1952) through the Eyes of Its Youngest Member.
- Thomas, David N., G. E. (Tony) Fogg, Peter Convey, Christian H. Fritsen, Josep-Maria Gili, Rold Gradinger, Johanna Laybourn-Parry, Keith Reid, and David W. H. Walton - The Biology of Polar Regions: Revised Edition. Biology of Habitats.
- Thomson, David - Scott, Shackleton, and Amundesen: ambition and tragedy in the Antarctic.
- Triggs, Gillian D. – The Antarctic Treaty Regime: Law, Environment and Resources.
- Tulloch, Coral - Antarctica: The Heart of the World.
- Tyler-Lewis, Kelly - The Lost Men: the Harrowing Story of Shackleton's Ross Sea Party.
- Tyrell, G. W. – A Contribution to the Petrography of the South Shetland Islands, the Palmer Archipelago, and the Danco Land Coast, Antarctica.
- United Nations General Assembly – Question of Antarctica: Report of the Secretary-General.
- Vicuna, Francisco Orrego - Antarctic Mineral Exploitation: The Emerging Framework.
- Vicuna, Francisco Orrego – Antarctic Resources Policy: Scientific, Legal and Political Issues.
- Wainwright, J. A. - Flight of the Falcon: Scott's Journey to the South Pole 1910–1912.
- Weyers, Chris - White demon: one man's quest for the South Pole.
- Wheeler, Sara - Cherry: a life of Apsley Cherry-Garrard.
- Wheeler, Sara - Terra incognita: travels in Antarctica.
- Williams, Isobel - With Scott in the Antarctic: Edward Wilson, Explorer, Naturalist, Artist.
- Worsley, Frank Arthur - Endurance: An Epic of Polar Adventure.
- Worsley, Frank Arthur - Shackleton's Boat Journey.
