= List of National Historic Sites of Canada in Nunavut =

This is a list of National Historic Sites (French: Lieux historiques nationaux) in the territory of Nunavut. There are 12 National Historic Sites designated in Nunavut, one of which is in the national park system, administered by Parks Canada (identified below by the beaver icon ).

Related to the Sites, National Historic Events also occurred in Nunavut, and are identified at places associated with them, using the same style of federal plaque which marks National Historic Sites. National Historic Persons are commemorated in the same way. The markers do not indicate which designation—a Site, Event, or Person—a subject has been given.

This list uses names designated by the national Historic Sites and Monuments Board, which may differ from other names for these sites.

== National Historic Sites ==
Site	Date(s)	Designated	Location	Description	Image
Arvia'juaq and Qikiqtaarjuk		1995	Arviat and Sentry Island; 61°08′23″N 093°59′36″W	A traditional summer camp of the Paallirmiut Inuit and an archaeological site on Hudson Bay; representative of the cultural, spiritual and economic life of the Inuit in the Arviat region	
Beechey Island Sites	1845–46 (wintering site), 1852–54 (search expeditions)	1993	Beechey Island and Devon Island; 74°43′N 091°51′W	Sites associated with Arctic exploration, including the wintering site of Franklin's lost expedition and a base for subsequent search expeditions	Graves of the dead crewman from the 1845 Franklin Northwest Passage expedition
Blacklead Island Whaling Station	1860 (established)	1985	Blacklead Island; 64°58′59″N 066°12′00″W	One of the most important whaling stations and wintering sites in Cumberland Sound from the 1860s until the early 20th century; a good example of a contact-period Inuit village	Blacklead Island Whaling Station in 1903
Bloody Falls	1700 BCE (c.) (human occupation)	1978	Kugluk/Bloody Falls Territorial Park; 67°44′36″N 115°22′03″W	Archaeological remains on river terraces of pre-contact hunting and fishing sites; a record of the presence of Pre-Dorset, Thule, First Nation and Inuit peoples over the last 3000 years	Middle of Blood Falls rapids
Fall Caribou Crossing		1995	Kivalliq Region; 63°38′37″N 096°02′58″W	A section of the lower Kazan River which has witnessed centuries of inland caribou hunting; symbolic of the cultural, spiritual and economic life of the Inuit in the region	
Igloolik Island Archaeological Sites	2000 BCE (c.) (human occupation)	1978	Igloolik Island; 69°23′N 081°40′W	Nine archaeological sites dating from Dorset and Pre-Dorset occupations, demonstrating 4000 years of human activity; also the wintering site for William Parry in 1821 and the base of the Fifth Thule Expedition of 1921–24	
Inuksuk		1969	Foxe Peninsula; 64°34′19″N 078°10′17″W	100 inuksuit standing on a treeless headland; a testament to the ingenuity and artistry of the Inuit	Inuksuit at Inuksuk Point
Kekerten Island Whaling Station	1857 (established)	1985	Cumberland Sound; 65°42′N 065°48′W	The remains of a whaling station, as well as a burial ground and a shipwreck; symbolic of whaling in the Eastern Arctic and of the economic and cultural impact of the whaling on the Inuit in the region	Structures at Kekerten
Kodlunarn Island	1576–78 (expeditions)	1964	Frobisher Bay; 62°49′03″N 065°25′44″W	The ruins of a stone house, earthworks and mining excavations from Martin Frobisher's gold mining expeditions to the Canadian Arctic Archipelago	
Port Refuge		1978	Grinnell Peninsula; 77°00′17″N 096°09′49″W	Archaeological sites dating to prehistoric occupation, including a Thule winter village and remains of Pre-Dorset dwellings, including evidence of Thule contact with the medieval Norse colonies of Greenland	
Wreck of HMS Breadalbane	1853 (wreck)	1983	Beechey Island; 74°43′N 091°51′W	The wreck of the ship involved in the search for Franklin's lost expedition	Engraving of the sinking of Breadalbane
Wrecks of HMS Erebus and HMS Terror	1845–46 (expedition)	1992; joined park system in 2015	Queen Maud Gulf north by northeast of O'Reilly Island; 68.235931°N 98.714376°W	The remains of HMS Erebus and HMS Terror, the two ships of Franklin's lost expedition in 1845–46, believed to have been trapped and wrecked by pack ice; official location includes remains of HMS Erebus (Discovered at Wilmot and Crampton Bay in September 2014); and remains of HMS Terror (Discovered at Terror Bay in September 2016)	Engraving of HMS Terror thrown up by the ice

== See also ==
- History of Nunavut
- List of historic places in Nunavut
