= List of historic places in Nunavut =

This article is a list of historic places in the territory of Nunavut entered on the Canadian Register of Historic Places. In Canada, historic places are formally recognized for their heritage value by a federal, provincial, territorial or municipal authority.

== List of historic places ==
Name	Address	Coordinates	Government recognition (CRHP №)	Wikidata ID	Image
Fort Conger	Lady Franklin Bay; Alert NU	81°45′N 64°45′W	Nunavut (16360)	Q3077812	More images
Arvia'juaq and Qikiqtaarjuk National Historic Site	Sentry Island; Arviat NU	61°09′06″N 93°55′12″W	Federal (1161)	Q4802400	Upload Photo
Bloody Falls National Historic Site of Canada	Coppermine River SW of Kugluktuk; Kugluktuk NU	67°44′N 115°22′W	Federal (1167)	Q3364770	More images
Fall Caribou Crossing National Historic Site	Kazan River; Baker Lake NU	63°38′37″N 96°02′58″W	Federal (9165)	Q22956540	More images
Wrecks of HMS Erebus and HMS Terror National Historic Site	Erebus Bay, King William Island; Gjoa Haven NU	69°17′59″N 98°55′00″W	Federal (19683)	Q75356330	More images
Garage	FOX MAIN; Sanirajak NU	68°45′40″N 81°13′37″W	Federal (2998)	Q58189521	Upload Photo
Hangar	FOX MAIN; Sanirajak NU	68°46′14″N 81°13′50″W	Federal (3058)	Q58189530	Upload Photo
Module Train A	FOX MAIN; Sanirajak NU	68°45′40″N 81°13′37″W	Federal (3082)	Q58189528	Upload Photo
Module Train B	FOX MAIN; Sanirajak NU	68°45′40″N 81°13′37″W	Federal (3084)	Q58189525	Upload Photo
Warehouse 2 HAL B13B Classified Federal Heritage Building	FOX MAIN; Sanirajak NU	68°45′40″N 81°13′37″W	Federal (3087)	Q58189520	Upload Photo
FOX-M, Air Terminal Building	FOX MAIN; Sanirajak NU	68°46′15″N 81°13′53″W	Federal (3289)	Q58189523	Upload Photo
Atwell Dormitory HAL B02C	FOX MAIN; Sanirajak NU	68°45′40″N 81°13′37″W	Federal (3290)	Q58189516	Upload Photo
Kodlunarn Island National Historic Site	Kodlunarn Island, Frobisher Bay; Iqaluit NU	62°49′03″N 65°25′44″W	Federal (11908)	Q22547674	More images
Kekerten Island Whaling Station National Historic Site	Kekerten Island; Pangnirtung NU	65°42′06″N 65°49′09″W	Federal (15682)	Q3593112	More images
Blacklead Island Whaling Station National Historic Site	Blacklead Island; Pangnirtung NU	64°58′58″N 66°12′36″W	Federal (15787)	Q15071763	More images
Marble Island	Hudson Bay; Rankin Inlet NU	62°41′00″N 91°08′00″W	Nunavut (7102)	Q1892418	Upload Photo
Dealy Island	Melville Island; Resolute NU	74°57′28″N 108°42′25″W	Nunavut (7104)	Q22612488	Upload Photo
Beechey Island	Wellington Channel; Resolute NU	74°00′00″N 91°55′00″W	Federal (17342), Nunavut (7105)	Q741133	More images
Wreck of the HMS Breadalbane National Historic Site	Beechey Island; Resolute NU	74°00′00″N 91°55′00″W	Federal (15149)	Q4959197	More images
Port Refuge National Historic Site	Devon Island; Resolute NU	77°00′17″N 96°09′49″W	Federal (16024)	Q22960347	Upload Photo
Dedricks Hut	Quttinirpaaq National Park; Resolute NU	81°44′42″N 64°47′09″W	Federal (18073)	Q58189509	Upload Photo
Igloolik Island Archaeological Sites National Historic Site of Canada	Igloolik Island; Igloolik NU	69°22′43″N 81°42′52″W	Federal (16921)	Q5992109	More images
Inuksuk National Historic Site of Canada	Foxe Peninsula; Baffin Island NU	69°22′43″N 81°42′52″W	Federal (18947)	Q5140274	More images
Dwelling/House	Former HBC Ford Lake Post; Ukkusiksalik National Park NU	65°55′30″N 90°54′27″W	Federal (19632)	Q58189512	More images
Store/Warehouse	Former HBC Ford Lake Post; Ukkusiksalik National Park NU	65°55′32″N 90°54′41″W	Federal (19633)	Q58189632	More images
Tractor Depot	Former HBC Ford Lake Post; Ukkusiksalik National Park NU	65°55′32″N 90°54′34″W	Federal (19631)	Q58189515	More images
RCMP Alexandra Fiord Detachment (V108)	Ellesmere Island, Nunavut, Canada; NU	78°52′47.39″N 75°45′16.45″W	Federal (23175)	Q131422579	Upload Photo
RCMP Alexandra Fiord Detachment (V109)	Ellesmere Island, Nunavut, Canada; NU	78°52′47.39″N 75°45′16.45″W	Federal (23176)	Q131422678	Upload Photo
RCMP Alexandra Fiord Detachment (V110)	Ellesmere Island, Nunavut, Canada; NU	78°52′47.39″N 75°45′16.56″W	Federal (23177)	Q131422655	Upload Photo
RCMP Alexandra Fiord Detachment (V111)	Ellesmere Island, Nunavut, Canada; NU	78°52′47.39″N 75°45′16.56″W	Federal (23178)	Q131422688	Upload Photo
RCMP Alexandra Fiord Detachment (V112)	Ellesmere Island, Nunavut, Canada; NU	78°52′47.39″N 75°45′16.56″W	Federal (23179)	Q131422692	Upload Photo
RCMP Alexandra Fiord Detachment (V114)	Ellesmere Island, Nunavut, Canada; NU	78°52′47.39″N 75°45′16.56″W	Federal (23180)	Q131422697	Upload Photo
Inuit Hut	Quttinirpaaq National Park of Canada, Nunavut, Canada; NU	81°44′41.640″N 64°47′8.880″W	Federal (23696)	Q58189519	Upload Photo
Henson's Hut	Quttinirpaaq National Park of Canada, Nunavut, Canada; NU	81°44′41.640″N 64°47′8.880″W	Federal (23695)	Q58189511	Upload Photo

== See also ==
- List of National Historic Sites of Canada in Nunavut
