= Qikiqtaarjuk (disambiguation) =

Qikiqtaarjuk may refer to:

- Qikiqtaarjuk, an island in the Canadian Arctic Archipelago
- Qikiqtaarjuk, a peninsula on the north side of Igloolik Island
- Qikiqtaarjuk, one of the two areas in the Arvia'juaq and Qikiqtaarjuk National Historic Site
