= Prehistory =

Period of human history before records

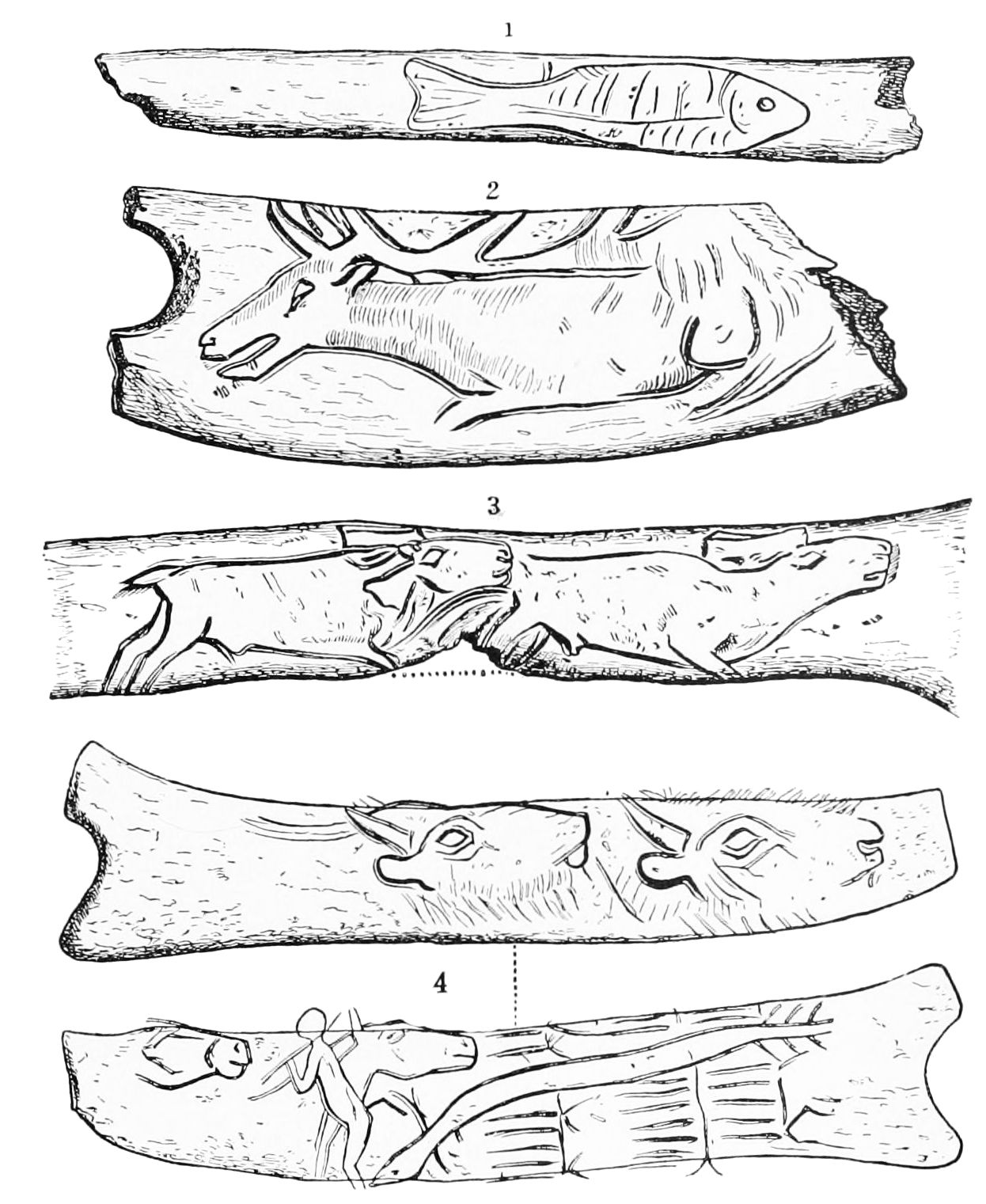
Engraved images of animals on antler

Prehistory, sometimes referred to as pre-literary history, is the period of human history between the first known use of stone tools by hominins c. 3.3 million years ago and the beginning of recorded history with the invention of writing systems. The use of symbols, marks, and images appears very early, but the earliest known writing systems appeared c. 5,200 years ago. The adoption of writing across the globe was a gradual process, the end of prehistory occurred at different times in different places, and the term is less often used in discussing societies where prehistory ended relatively recently. The period when a culture is written about by others, but has not developed its own writing system is often known as the protohistory of the culture.

Human prehistory differs from history not only in terms of its chronology but also in the way it deals with the activities of archaeological cultures rather than named nations or individuals. Restricted to material processes, remains, and artefacts rather than written records, prehistory is anonymous. Because of this, reference terms that prehistorians use, such as "Neanderthal" or "Iron Age", are modern labels with definitions sometimes subject to debate. In most cases however, and in particular as one goes back further in time, these assigned labels are the only way of distinguishing groups of prehistoric peoples and conveying information about them in the present.

By definition, there are no written records from human prehistory, which can only be known from material archaeological and anthropological evidence: prehistoric materials and human remains. These were at first understood by the collection of folklore and by analogy with pre-literate societies observed in modern times.

== History of the term ==
The notion of "prehistory" emerged during the Enlightenment in the work of antiquarians who used the word "primitive" to describe societies that existed before written records. The word "prehistory" first appeared in English in 1836 in the Foreign Quarterly Review.

The geologic time scale for pre-human time periods, and the three-age system for human prehistory, were systematised during the nineteenth century in the work of British, French, German, and Scandinavian anthropologists, archaeologists, and antiquarians. An early conception of "prehistory" arose suggesting that without written records there could be no history and no way to speak meaningfully about the people who left behind no writing. The most common conception today is that history is based on a wide range of evidence, and while some historians have been uncomfortable with using prehistory as a term, the concept of prehistory has been questioned but not discarded. Archaeologists in particular view the term as a meaningful and necessary distinction of the type of work they do and the stories they can convey about the past.

== Means of research ==
The main source of information for prehistory is the archaeological record, frequently studied in context with research from other disciplines such as the natural sciences.

The primary researchers into human prehistory are anthropologists (archaeologists and physical anthropologists) who use excavation, geologic and geographic surveys, and other scientific analysis to reveal and interpret the nature and behavior of pre-literate and non-literate peoples. Human population geneticists and historical linguists are also providing valuable insight. Cultural anthropologists help provide context for societal interactions, by which objects of human origin pass among people, allowing an analysis of any article that arises in a human prehistoric context. Therefore, data about prehistory is provided by a wide variety of natural and social sciences, such as anthropology, archaeology, archaeoastronomy, comparative linguistics, biology, geology, molecular genetics, paleontology, palynology, physical anthropology, and many others.

The key step to understanding prehistoric evidence is dating, and reliable dating techniques have developed steadily since the nineteenth century. The most common of these dating techniques is radiocarbon dating. Further evidence has come from the reconstruction of ancient spoken languages. More recent techniques include forensic chemical analysis to reveal the use and provenance of materials, and genetic analysis of bones to determine kinship and physical characteristics of prehistoric peoples.

== Definition ==
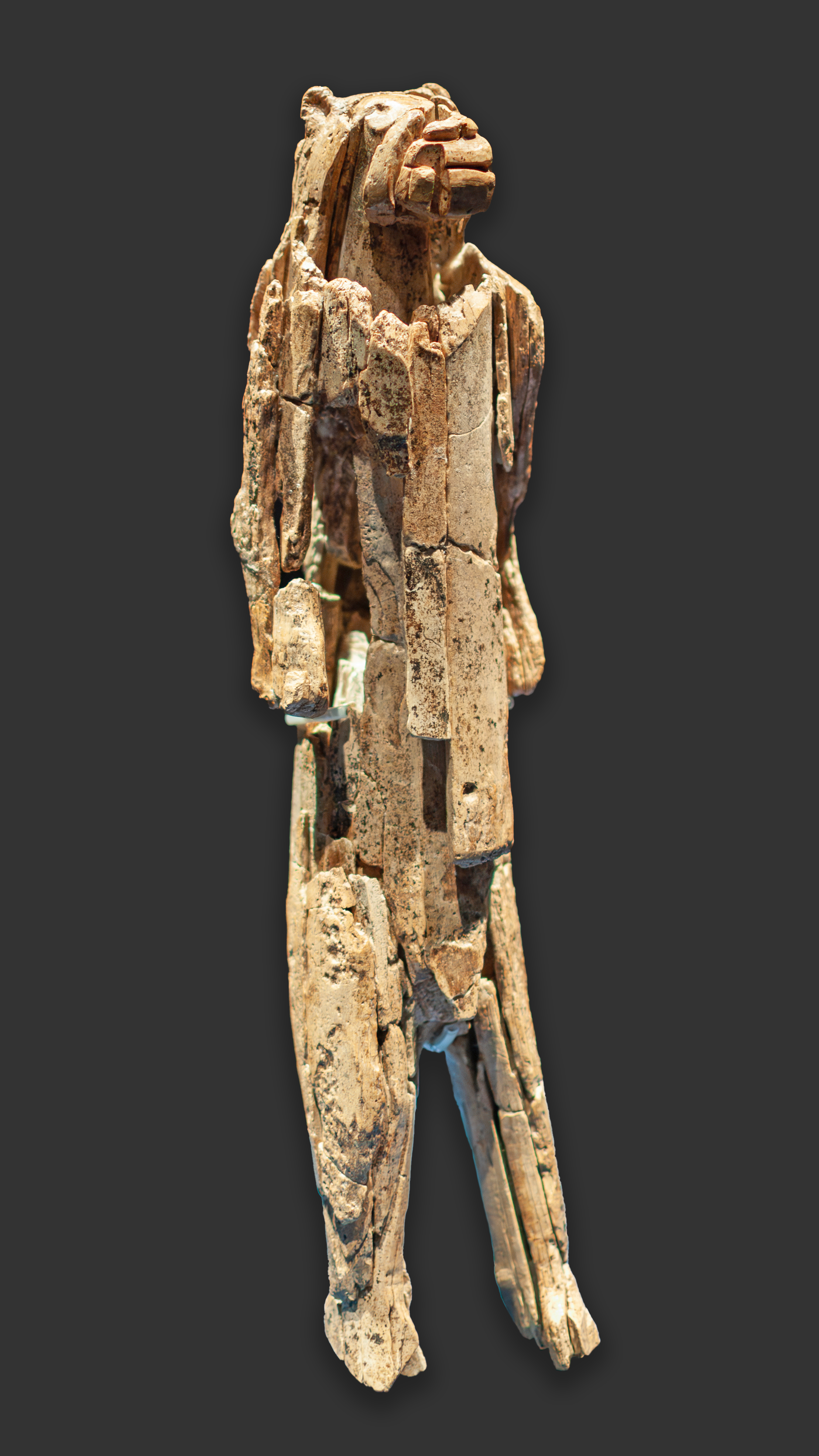
Lion-Man of Hohlenstein-Stadel, Aurignacian culture, c. 41,000 BP

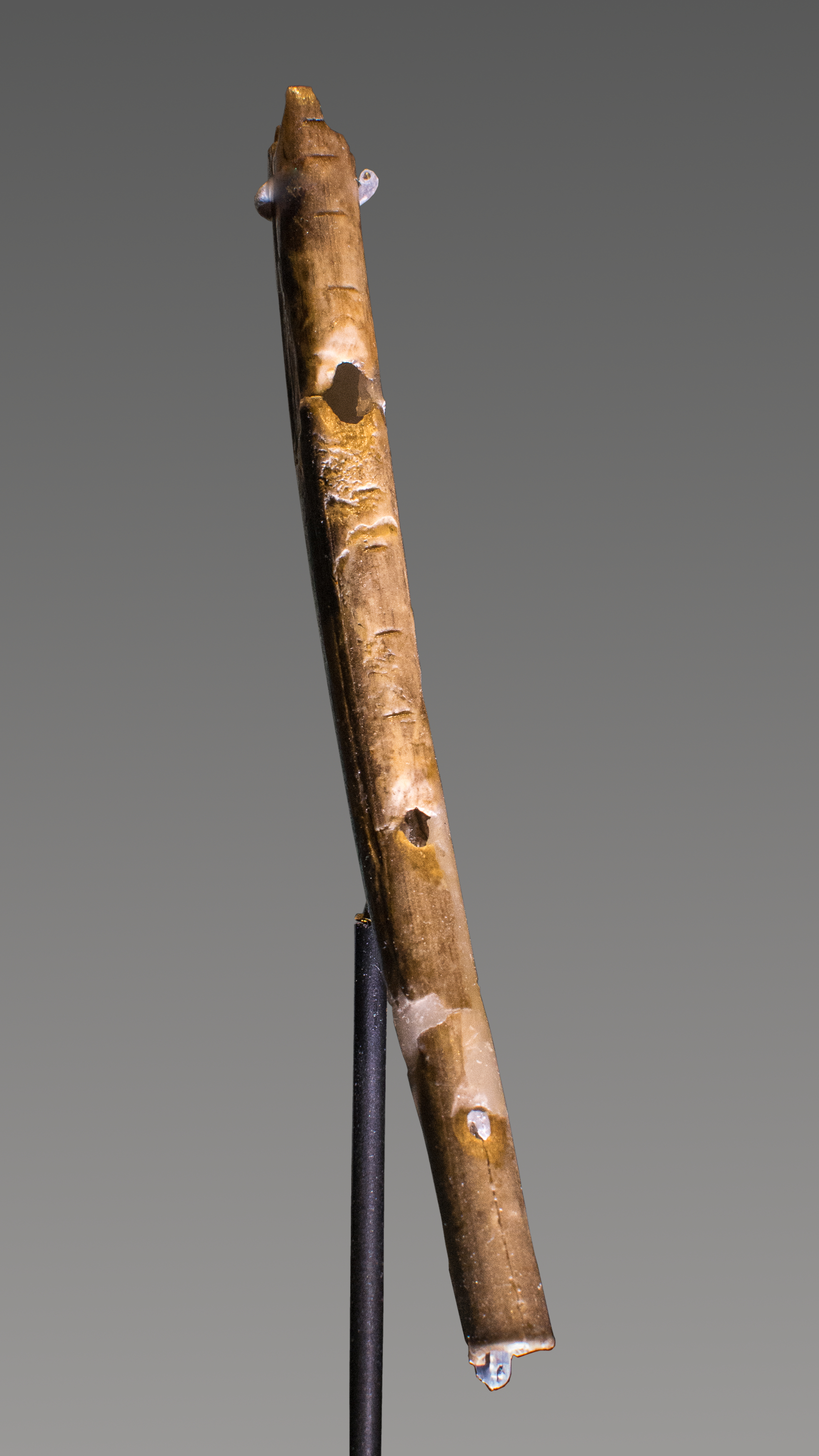
Bone flute from Geißenklösterle. Aurignacian culture, 43,000–35,000 BC

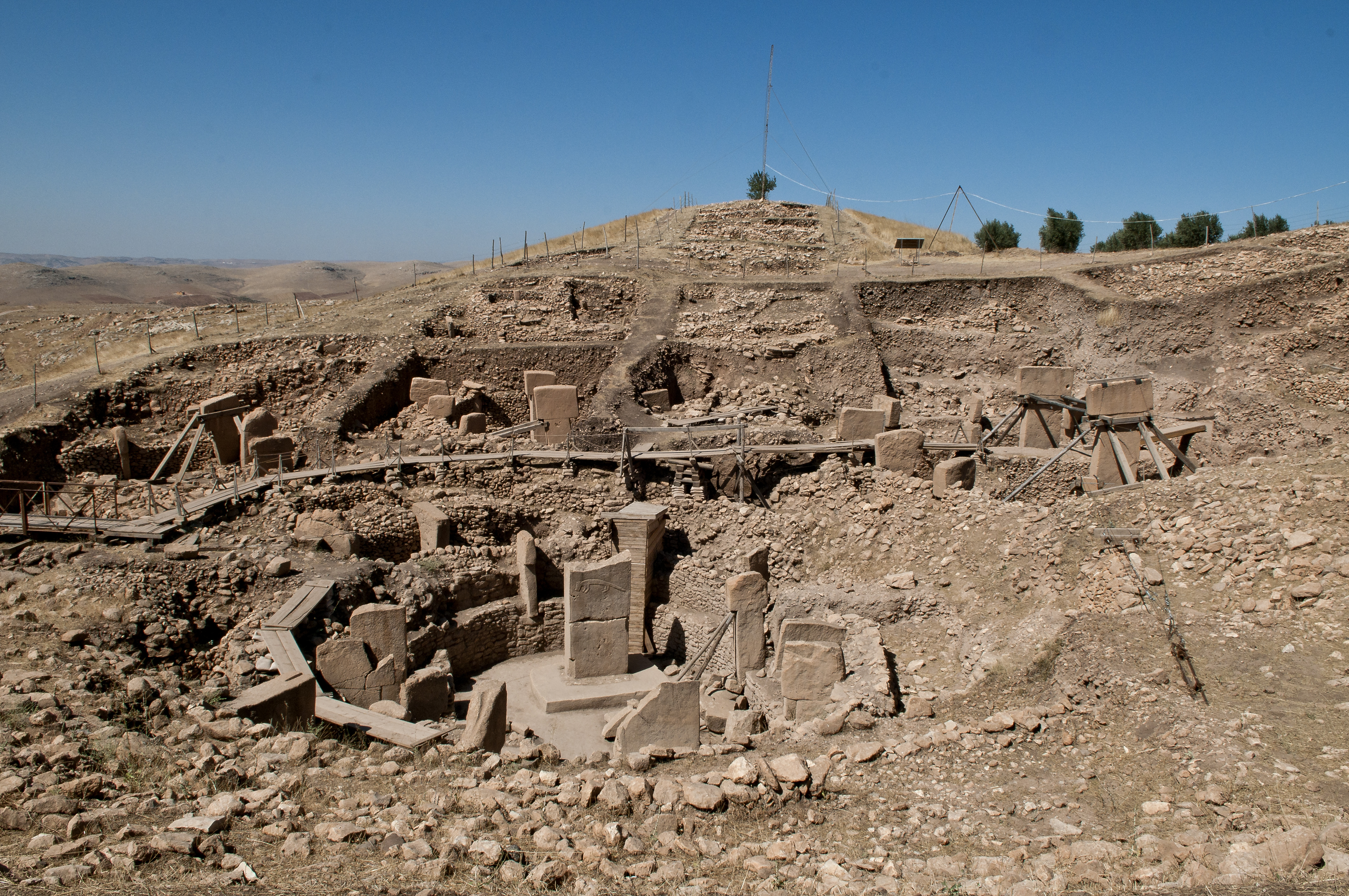
Massive stone pillars at Göbekli Tepe, in southeast Turkey, erected for ritual use by early Neolithic people 11,000 years ago

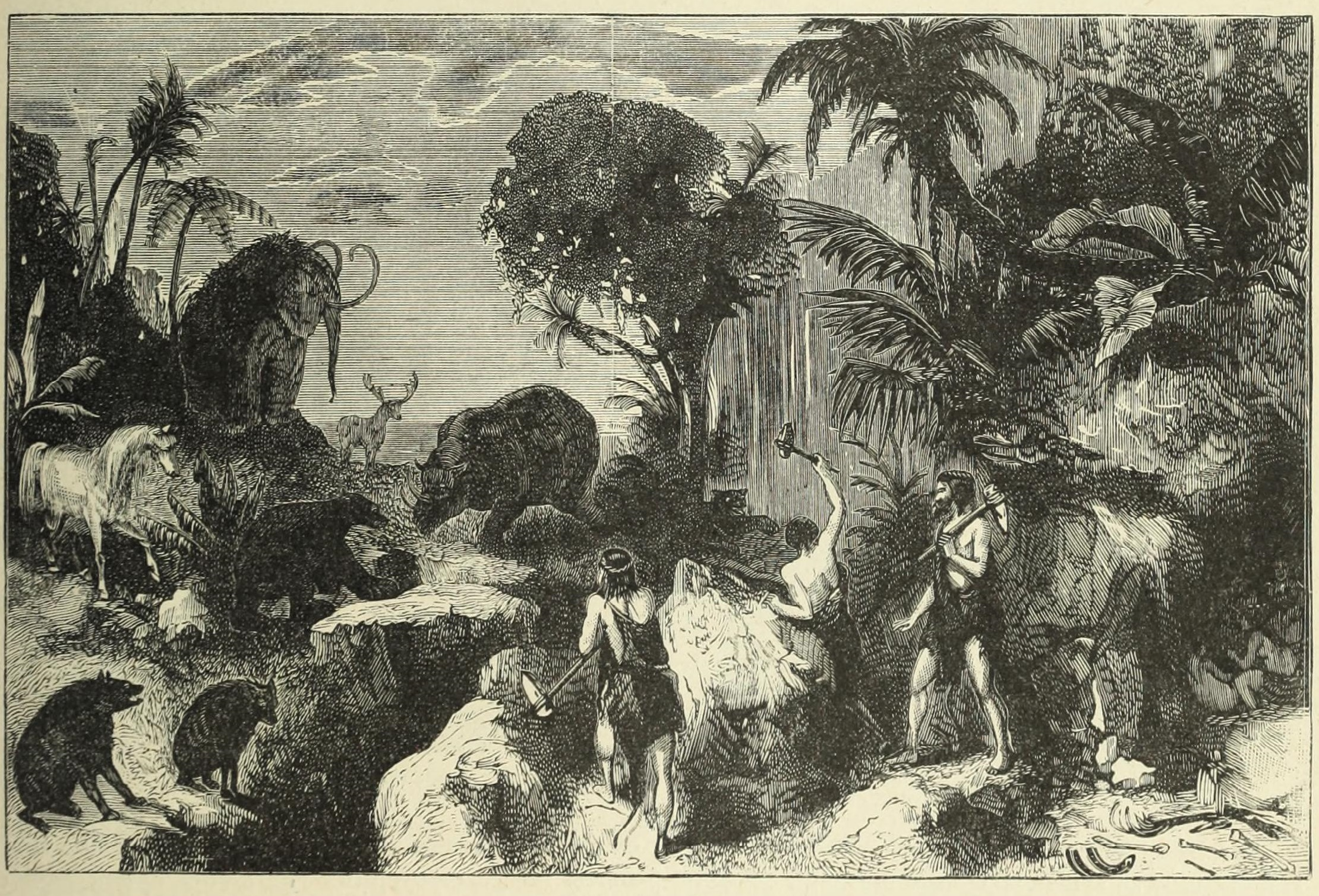
A nineteenth century concept of early humans in a wilderness

=== Beginning and end ===
The beginning of prehistory is normally taken to be marked by human-like beings appearing on Earth. The date marking its end is typically defined as the advent of the contemporary written historical record.

Both dates consequently vary widely from region to region. For example, African prehistory begins c. 2.5 million years ago, while prehistoric Asia date back to 1.8 million years ago; and European prehistory begins c. 1.3 million years ago upon the first arrival of humans to the region. Depending on the date when relevant records become a useful academic resource, its end date also varies. For example, in Egypt it is generally accepted that prehistory ended around 3100 BC, whereas in New Guinea the end of the prehistoric era is set much more recently, in the 1870s, when the Russian anthropologist Nicholai Miklukho-Maklai spent several years living among native peoples, and described their way of life in a comprehensive treatise. In Europe the relatively well-documented classical cultures of Ancient Greece and Ancient Rome had neighbouring cultures, including the Celts and the Etruscans, with little writing. Historians debate how much weight to give to the sometimes biased accounts of these protohistoric cultures found in Greek and Roman literature.

=== Time periods ===
In dividing up human prehistory in Eurasia, historians typically use the three-age system, whereas scholars of pre-human time periods typically use the well-defined geologic record and its internationally defined stratum base within the geologic time scale. The three-age system is the periodization of human prehistory into three consecutive time periods, named for their predominant tool-making technologies: Stone Age, Bronze Age and Iron Age. In some areas, there is also a transition period between Stone Age and Bronze Age, the Chalcolithic or Copper Age.

In the early Bronze Age, Sumer in Mesopotamia, the Indus Valley Civilisation, and ancient Egypt were the first civilizations to develop their own scripts and keep historical records, with their neighbors following. Most other civilizations reached their end of prehistory during the following Iron Age. The three-age division of prehistory into Stone Age, Bronze Age, and Iron Age remains in use for much of Eurasia and North Africa, but is not generally used in those parts of the world where the working of hard metals arrived abruptly from contact with Eurasian cultures, such as Oceania, Australasia, much of Sub-Saharan Africa, and parts of the Americas. With some exceptions in pre-Columbian civilizations in the Americas, these areas did not develop writing systems before the arrival of Eurasians, so their prehistory reaches into relatively recent periods; for example, 1788 is usually taken as the end of the prehistory of Australia. For the prehistory of the Americas see Pre-Columbian era.

== Stone Age ==
The concept of a "Stone Age" is found useful in the archaeology of most of the world, although in the archaeology of the Americas it is called by different names and begins with a Lithic stage, or sometimes Paleo-Indian. The sub-divisions described below are used for Eurasia, and not consistently across the whole area.

The period lasted for roughly 3.4 million years and ended between 4000 BC and 2000 BC, with the advent of metalworking. It was followed by the Copper Age, then the Bronze Age. Because of its enormous timescale, the Stone Age encompasses 99% of human history.

=== Palaeolithic ===
Successive dispersals of Homo erectus (yellow), Homo neanderthalensis (ochre) during Out of Africa I and Homo sapiens (red, Out of Africa II), with the numbers of years since they appeared before present.

"Palaeolithic" means "Old Stone Age", and begins with the first use of stone tools. The Paleolithic is the earliest period of the Stone Age. It extends from the earliest known use of stone tools by hominins c. 3.3 million years ago, to the end of the Pleistocene c. 11,650 BP (before the present period).

The early part of the Palaeolithic is called the Lower Paleolithic (as in excavations it appears underneath the Upper Paleolithic), beginning with the earliest stone tools dated to around 3.3 million years ago at the Lomekwi site in Kenya. These tools predate the genus Homo and were probably used by Kenyanthropus. Evidence of control of fire by early hominins during the Lower Palaeolithic Era is uncertain and has at best limited scholarly support. The most widely accepted claim is that H. erectus or H. ergaster made fires between 790,000 and 690,000 BP in a site at Bnot Ya'akov Bridge, Israel. The use of fire enabled early humans to cook food, provide warmth, have a light source, deter animals at night and meditate.

Early Homo sapiens originated some 300,000 years ago, ushering in the Middle Palaeolithic. Anatomic changes indicating modern language capacity also arise during the Middle Palaeolithic. During the Middle Palaeolithic Era, there is the first definitive evidence of human use of fire. Sites in Zambia have charred logs, charcoal and carbonized plants, that have been dated to 180,000 BP. The systematic burial of the dead, music, prehistoric art, and the use of increasingly sophisticated multi-part tools are highlights of the Middle Paleolithic.

The Upper Paleolithic extends from 50,000 and 12,000 years ago, with the first organized settlements and blossoming of artistic work.

Throughout the Palaeolithic, humans generally lived as nomadic hunter-gatherers. Hunter-gatherer societies tended to be very small and egalitarian, although hunter-gatherer societies with abundant resources or advanced food-storage techniques sometimes developed sedentary lifestyles with complex social structures such as chiefdoms, and social stratification. Long-distance contacts may have been established, as in the case of Indigenous Australian "highways" known as songlines.

=== Mesolithic ===
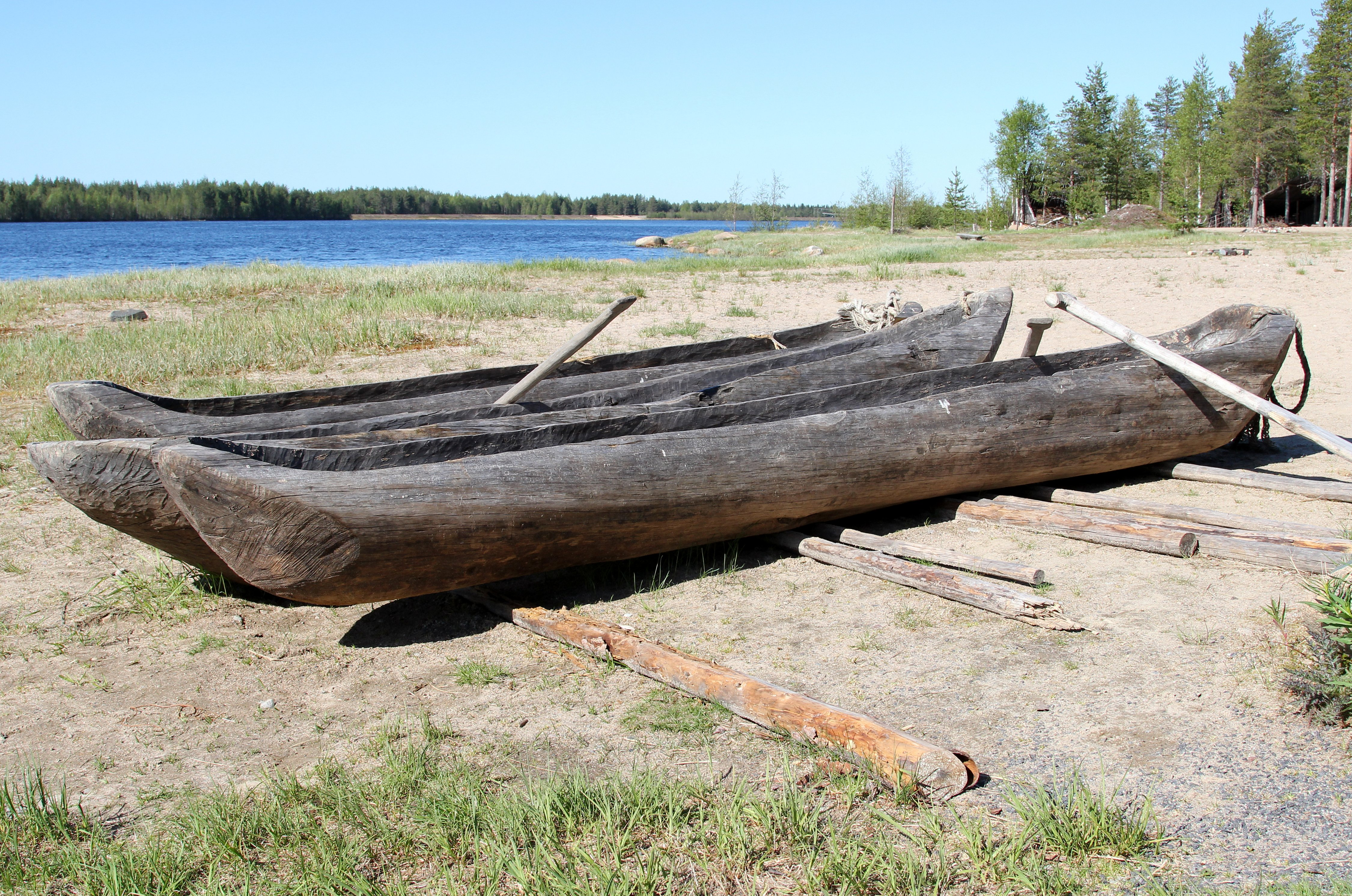
Dugout canoe

The Mesolithic, or Middle Stone Age (from the Greek mesos, 'middle', and lithos, 'stone'), was a period in the development of human technology between the Palaeolithic and Neolithic.

The Mesolithic period began with the retreat of glaciers at the end of the Pleistocene epoch, some 10,000 BP, and ended with the introduction of agriculture, the date of which varied by geographic region. In some areas, such as the Near East, agriculture was already underway by the end of the Pleistocene, and there the Mesolithic is short and poorly defined. In areas with limited glacial impact, the term "Epipalaeolithic" is preferred.

Regions that experienced greater environmental effects as the last ice age ended have a much more evident Mesolithic era, lasting millennia. In Northern Europe, societies were able to live well on rich food supplies from the marshlands fostered by the warmer climate. Such conditions produced distinctive human behaviours that are preserved in the material record, such as the Maglemosian and Azilian cultures. These conditions also delayed the coming of the Neolithic until as late as 4000 BC (6,000 BP) in northern Europe.

Remains from this period are few and far between, often limited to middens. In forested areas, the first signs of deforestation have been found, although this would only begin in earnest during the Neolithic, when more space was needed for agriculture.

The Mesolithic is characterized in most areas by small composite flint tools: microliths and microburins. Fishing tackle, stone adzes, and wooden objects such as canoes and bows have been found at some sites. These technologies first occur in Africa, associated with the Azilian cultures, before spreading to Europe through the Iberomaurusian culture of Northern Africa and the Kebaran culture of the Levant. However, independent discovery is not ruled out.

=== Neolithic ===
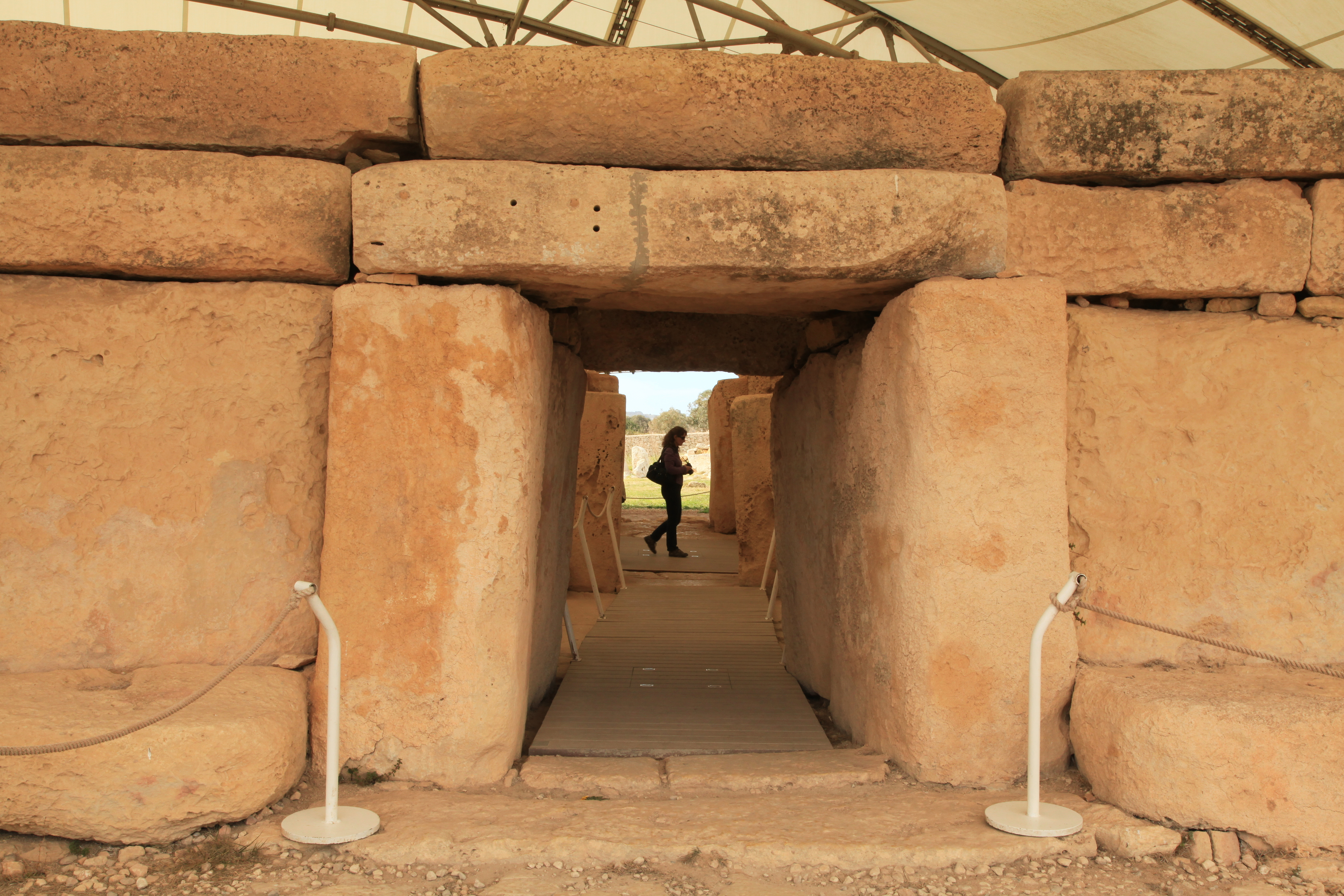
Entrance to the Ġgantija phase temple complex of Ħaġar Qim, Malta, 3900

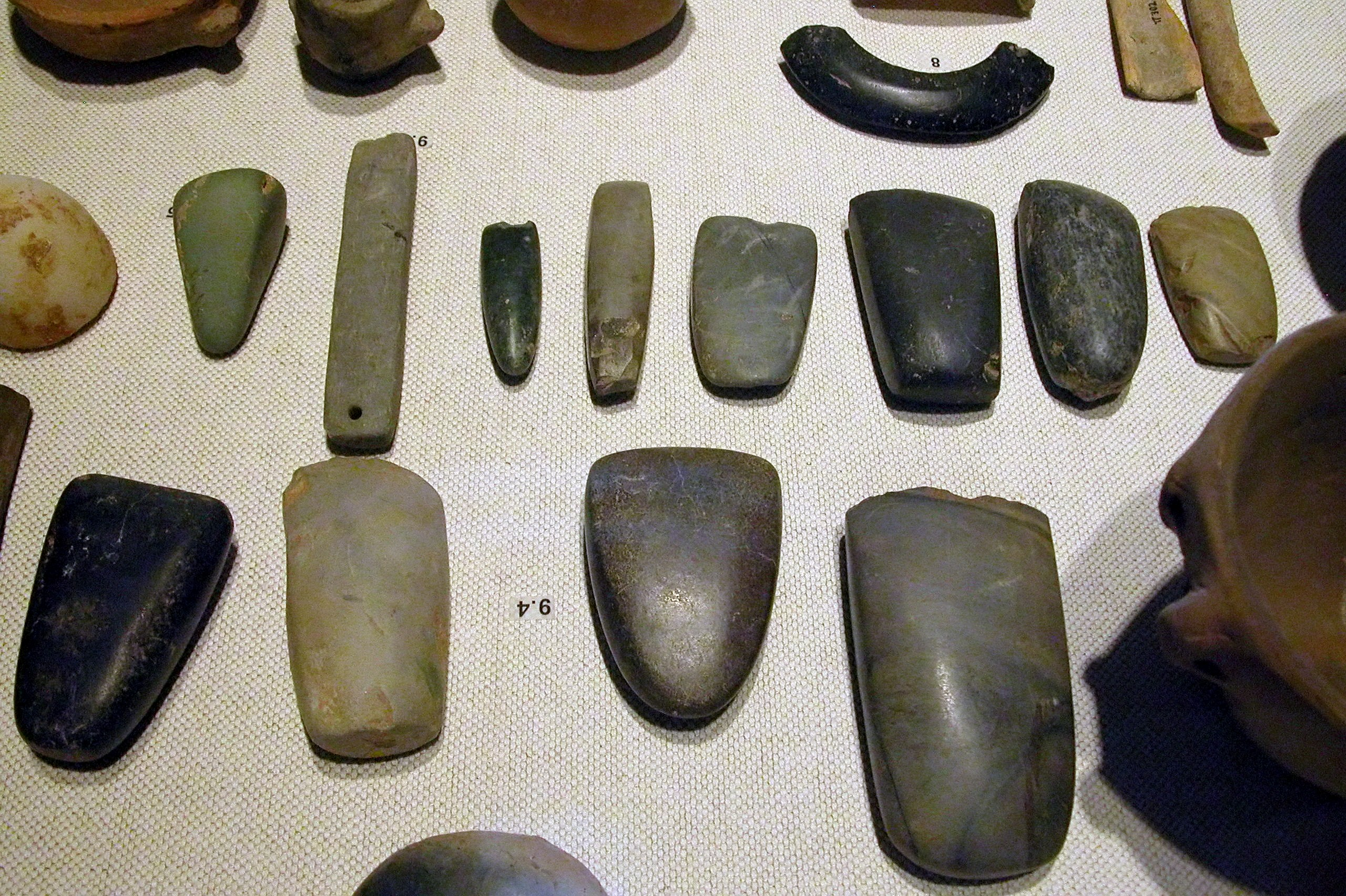
An array of Neolithic artefacts, including bracelets, axe heads, chisels, and polishing tools – Neolithic stone artefacts are by definition polished and, except for specialty items, not chipped

The Neolithic period, meaning "New Stone Age", began around 10,200 BC in some regions of the Middle East, or later in other parts of the world, and ended between 4,500 and 2,000 BC. Although there were several species of humans during the Paleolithic, by the Neolithic only Homo sapiens sapiens remained. This was a period of technological and social developments which established most of the basic elements of historical cultures, such as the domestication of crops and animals, and the establishment of permanent settlements and early chiefdoms. The era commenced with the beginning of farming, which produced the "Neolithic Revolution". It ended when metal tools became widespread (in the Copper Age or Bronze Age; or, in some geographical regions, in the Iron Age). The term Neolithic is commonly used in the Old World; its application to cultures in the Americas and Oceania is complicated by the fact that standard progression from stone to metal tools, as seen in the Old World, does not neatly apply.

Early Neolithic farming was limited to a narrow range of plants, both wild and domesticated, which included einkorn wheat, millet and spelt, and the keeping of dogs, sheep, and goats. By about 6,900–6,400 BC, it included domesticated cattle and pigs, the establishment of permanently or seasonally inhabited settlements, and the use of pottery. The Neolithic period saw the development of early villages, agriculture, animal domestication, tools, and the onset of the earliest recorded incidents of warfare.

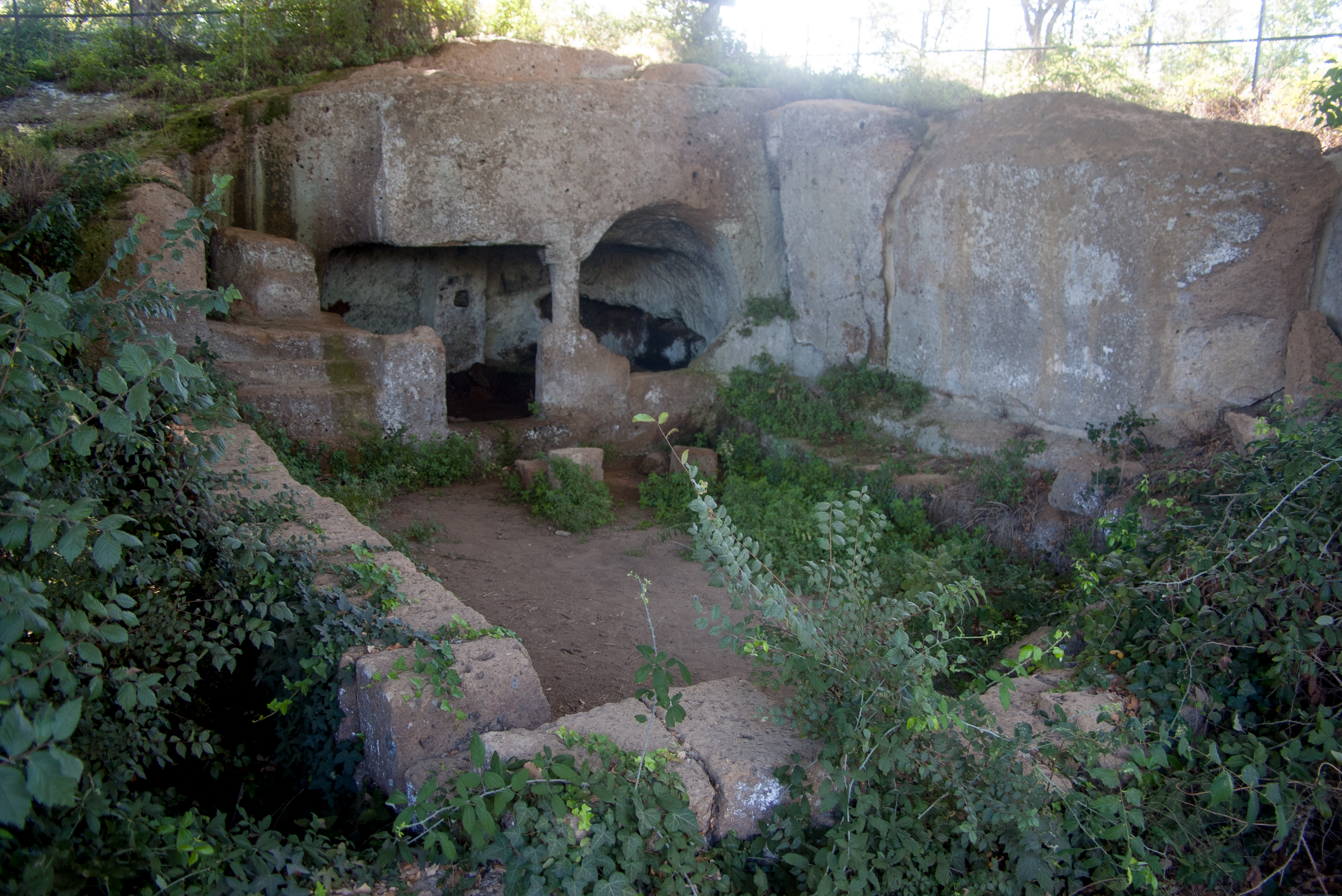
The monumental building at Luni sul Mignone in Blera, Italy, 3500 BC

Settlements became more permanent, some with circular houses made of mudbrick with a single room. These settlements may have a surrounding stone wall to keep domesticated animals in and hostile tribes out. Later settlements have rectangular mud-brick houses in which families lived in single or multiple rooms. Burial findings suggest an ancestor cult with preserved skulls of the dead. The Vinča culture may have created the earliest system of writing. The megalithic temple complexes of Ġgantija are notable for their gigantic structures. Although some late Eurasian Neolithic societies formed complex stratified chiefdoms or even states, states evolved in Eurasia only with the rise of metallurgy, and most Neolithic societies on the whole were relatively simple and egalitarian. Most clothing appears to have been made of animal skins, as indicated by finds of large numbers of bone and antler pins which are ideal for fastening leather. Wool cloth and linen might have become available during the later Neolithic, as suggested by finds of perforated stones that (depending on size) may have served as spindle whorls or loom weights.

== Chalcolithic ==
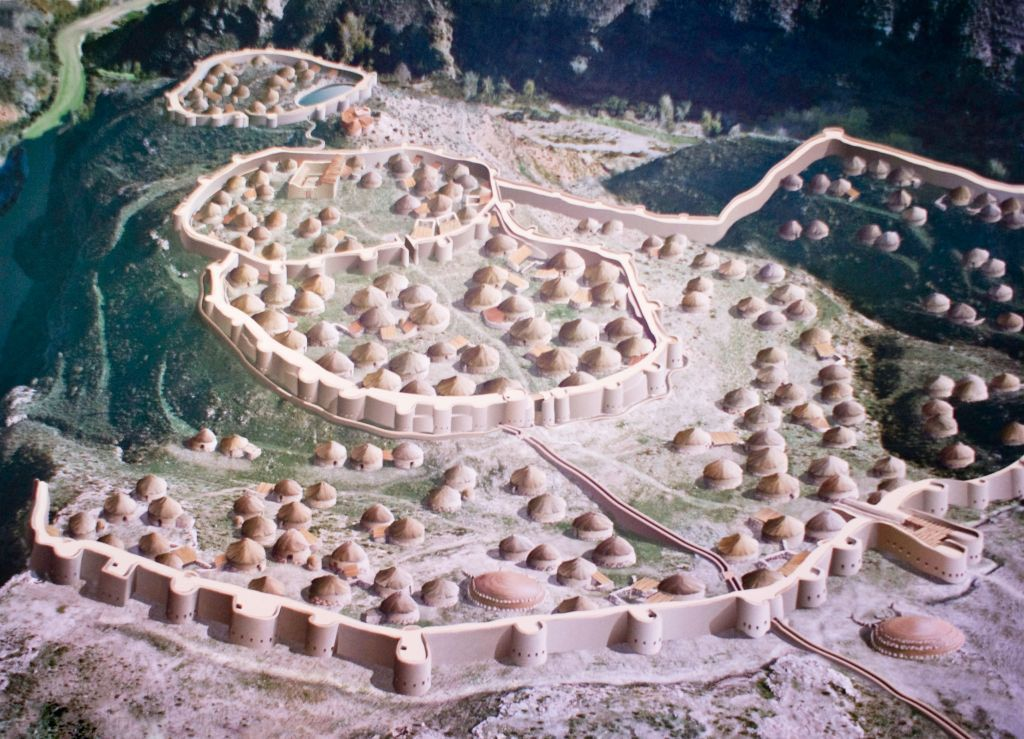
Artist's impression of a Copper Age walled city, Los Millares, Iberia

In Old World archaeology, the "Chalcolithic", "Eneolithic", or "Copper Age" refers to a transitional period where early copper metallurgy appeared alongside the widespread use of stone tools. During this period, some weapons and tools were made of copper. This period was still largely Neolithic in character. It is a phase of the Bronze Age before it was discovered that adding tin to copper formed the harder bronze. The Copper Age is seen as a transition period between the Stone Age and Bronze Age.

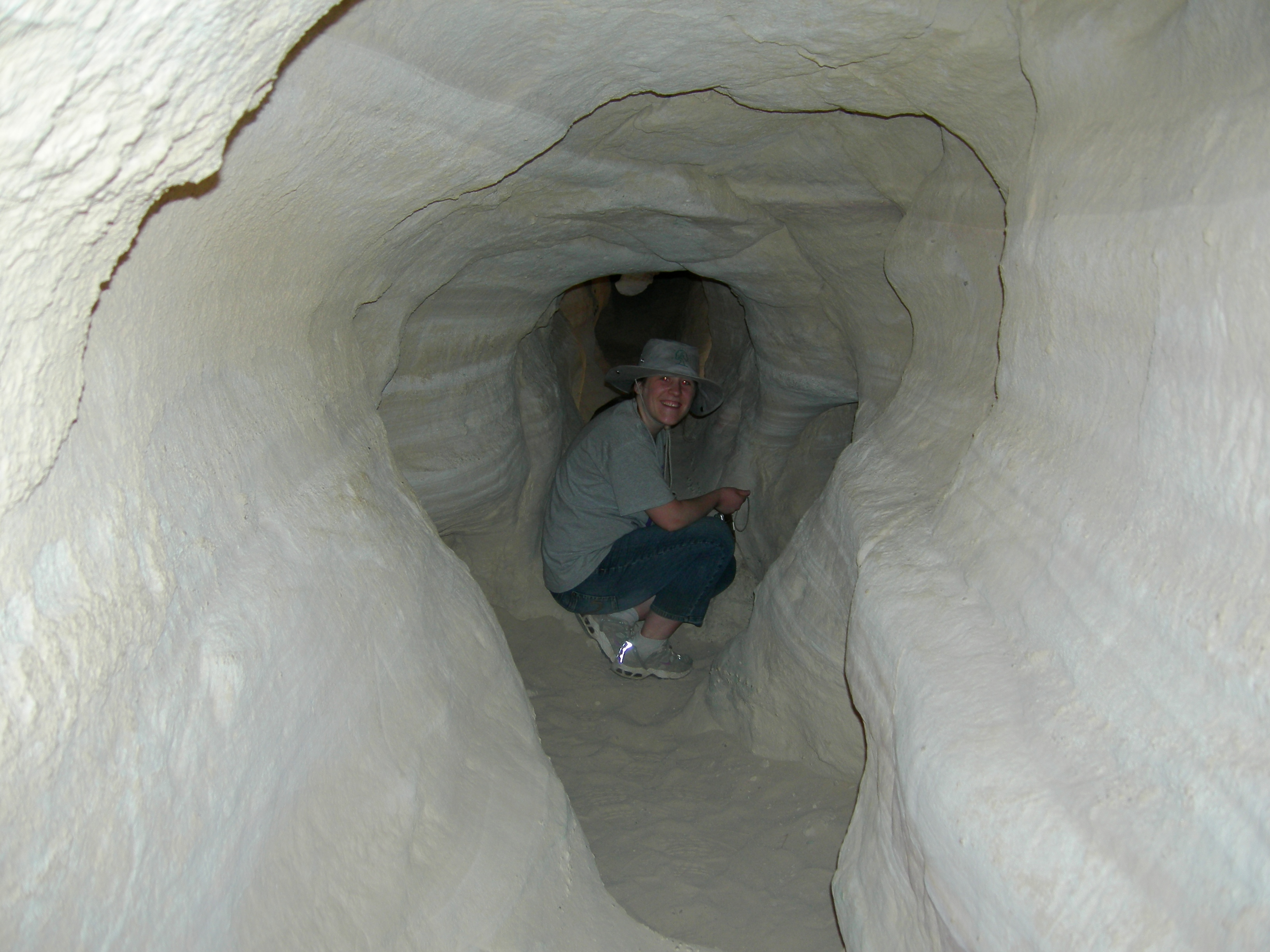
Chalcolithic copper mine in Timna Valley, Negev Desert, Israel

An archaeological site in Serbia contains the oldest securely dated evidence of copper making at high temperature, from 7,500 years ago. The find in 2010 extends the known record of copper smelting by about 800 years, and suggests that copper smelting may have been invented independently in separate parts of Asia and Europe at that time, rather than spreading from a single source. The emergence of metallurgy may have occurred first in the Fertile Crescent, where it gave rise to the Bronze Age in the 4th millennium BC (the traditional view), although finds from the Vinča culture in Europe have now been securely dated to slightly earlier than those of the Fertile Crescent. Timna Valley contains evidence of copper mining 7,000 years ago. The process of transition from Neolithic to Chalcolithic in the Middle East is characterized in archaeological stone tool assemblages by a decline in high quality raw material procurement and use. North Africa and the Nile Valley imported its iron technology from the Near East and followed the Near Eastern course of Bronze Age and Iron Age development.

== Bronze Age ==
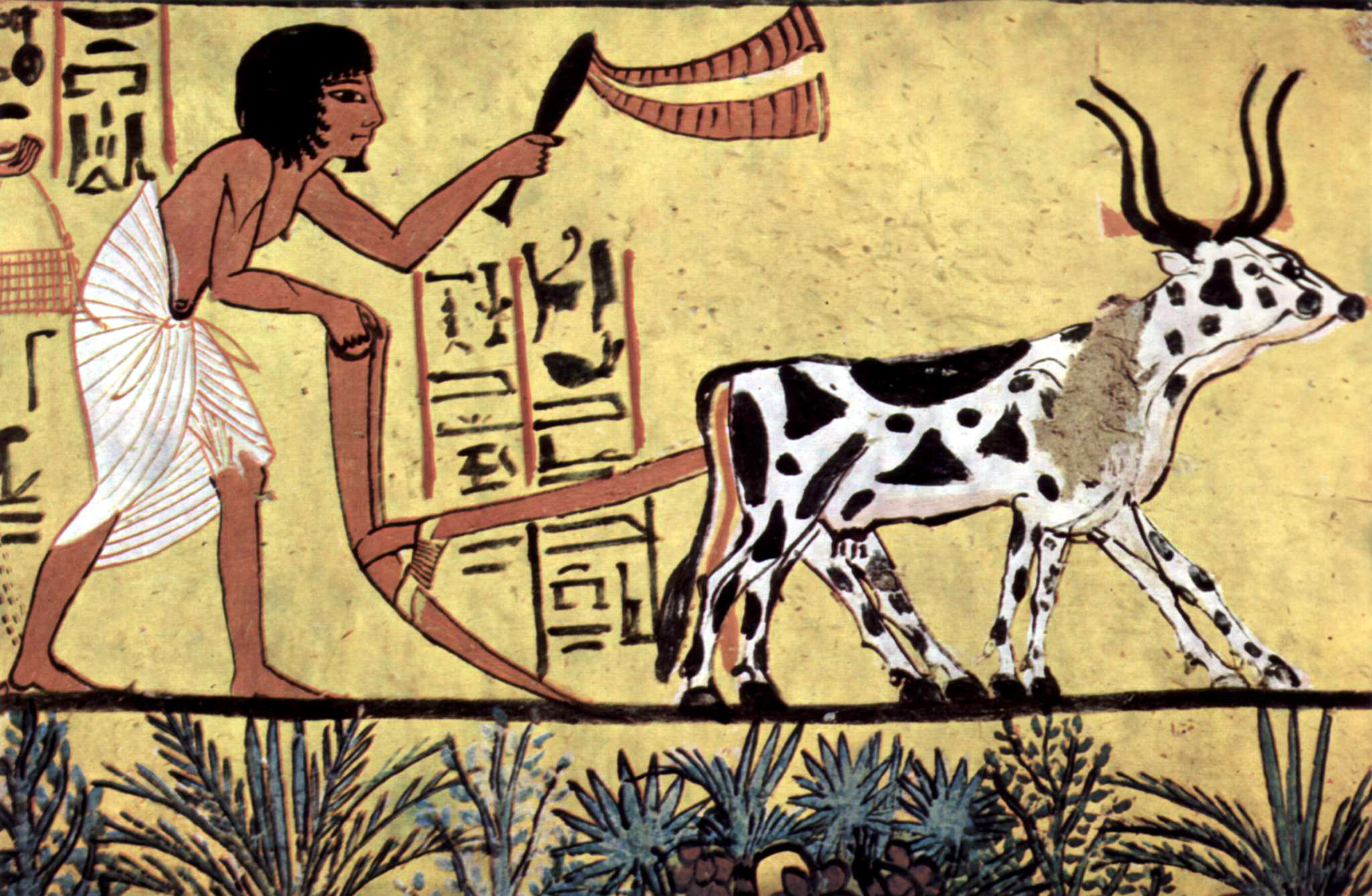
Painting of an ox-drawn plough, accompanied by script, Egypt, c. 1200 BC

The Bronze Age is the earliest period in which some civilizations reached the end of prehistory, by introducing written records. The Bronze Age is only considered to be part of prehistory for the regions and civilizations who didn't develop a system of keeping written records until later periods. The invention of writing coincides in some areas with the beginnings of the Bronze Age. After the appearance of writing, people started creating texts including written records of administrative matters.

The Bronze Age refers to a period in human cultural development when the most advanced metalworking (at least in systematic and widespread use) included techniques for smelting copper and tin from naturally occurring outcroppings of ores, and then combining them to cast bronze. These naturally occurring ores typically included arsenic as a common impurity. Tin ores are rare, as reflected in the fact there were no tin bronzes in Western Asia before 3000 BC. The Bronze Age forms part of the three-age system for prehistoric societies. In this system, it follows the Neolithic in some areas of the world.

While copper is a common ore, deposits of tin are rare in the Old World, and often had to be traded or carried considerable distances from the few mines, stimulating the creation of extensive trading routes. In many areas as far apart as China and England, the valuable new material was used for weapons, but for a long time apparently not available for agricultural tools. Much of it seems to have been hoarded by social elites, and sometimes deposited in extravagant quantities, from Chinese ritual bronzes and Indian copper hoards, to European hoards of unused axe-heads.

By the end of the Bronze Age large states, whose armies imposed themselves on people with a different culture, and are often called empires, had arisen in Egypt, China, Anatolia (the Hittites), and Mesopotamia, all of them literate.

== Iron Age ==
The Iron Age is not part of prehistory for all civilizations who had introduced written records during the Bronze Age. Most remaining civilizations did so during the Iron Age, often through conquest by empires, which continued to expand during this period. For example, in most of Europe conquest by the Roman Empire means the term Iron Age is replaced by "Roman", "Gallo-Roman", and similar terms after the conquest. Even before conquest, many areas began to have a protohistory, as they were written about by literate cultures; the protohistory of Ireland is an example.

In archaeology, the Iron Age refers to the advent of ferrous metallurgy. The adoption of iron coincided with other changes, often including more sophisticated agricultural practices, religious beliefs and artistic styles, which makes the archaeological Iron Age coincide with the "Axial Age" in the history of philosophy. Although iron ore is common, the metalworking techniques necessary to use iron are different from those needed for the metal used earlier, more heat is required. Once the technical challenge had been solved, iron replaced bronze as its higher abundance meant armies could be armed much more easily with iron weapons.

== Timeline ==
Hominin timeline
← / Earlier apes; ← / Gorilla split; ← / Chimpanzee split; ← / Earliest bipedal; ← / Earliest sign of Ardipithecus; ← / Earliest sign of Australopithecus; ← / Earliest stone tools; ← / Earliest sign of Homo; ← / Dispersal beyond Africa; ← / Earliest fire / cooking; ← / Earliest rock art; ← / Earliest clothes; ← / Modern humans
(million years ago)

All dates are approximate and conjectural, obtained through research in the fields of anthropology, archaeology, genetics, geology, or linguistics. They are all subject to revision due to new discoveries or improved calculations. BP stands for "Before Present (1950)." BC stands for "Before Christ".

=== Paleolithic ===
Lower Paleolithic

- c. 3.3 million BP – Earliest stone tools
- c. 2.8 million BP – Genus Homo appears
- c. 600,000 BP – Hunting-gathering
- c. 400,000 BP – Control of fire by early humans

Middle Paleolithic

- c. 300,000 BP – Anatomically modern humans (Homo sapiens sapiens) appear in Africa, one of whose characteristics is a lack of significant body hair compared to other primates. See Jebel Irhoud.
- c. 300,000–30,000 BP – Mousterian (Neanderthal) culture in Europe.
- c. 170,000–83,000 BP – Invention of clothing
- c. 75,000 BP – Toba Volcano supereruption.
- c. 80,000–50,000 BP – Homo sapiens exit Africa as a single population. In the next millennia, descendants from this population migrate to southern India, the Malay islands, Australia, Japan, China, Siberia, Alaska, and the northwestern coast of North America.
- c. 80,000–50,000? BP – Behavioral modernity, by this point including language and sophisticated cognition

Upper Paleolithic

- c. 45,000 BP / 43,000 BC – Beginnings of Châtelperronian culture in France.
- c. 43,000 BP - 37,000 BP The Aurignacian culture began, for example in the German Swabian Jura
- c. 40,000 BP / 38,000 BC – First human settlement in the southern half of the Australian mainland, by indigenous Australians (including the future sites of Sydney, Perth, and Melbourne.)
- c. 32,000 BP / 30,000 BC – Beginnings of Aurignacian culture, exemplified by the cave paintings ("parietal art") of Chauvet Cave in France.
- c. 30,500 BP / 28,500 BC – New Guinea is populated by colonists from Asia or Australia.
- c. 30,000 BP / 28,000 BC – A herd of reindeer is slaughtered and butchered by humans in the Vezere Valley in what is today France.
- c. 28,000–20,000 BP – Gravettian period in Europe. Harpoons, needles, and saws invented.
- c. 26,500 BP – Last Glacial Maximum (LGM). Subsequently, the ice melts and the glaciers retreat again (Late Glacial Maximum). During this latter period human beings return to Western Europe (see Magdalenian culture) and enter North America from Eastern Siberia for the first time (see Paleo-Indians, pre-Clovis culture and Settlement of the Americas).
- c. 26,000 BP / 24,000 BC – People around the world use fibres to make baby-carriers, clothes, bags, baskets, and nets.
- c. 25,000 BP / 23,000 BC – A settlement consisting of huts built of rocks and mammoth bones is founded near what is now Dolní Věstonice in Moravia in the Czech Republic. This is the oldest human permanent settlement that has been found by archaeologists.
- c. 23,000 BP / 21,000 BC – Small-scale trial cultivation of plants in Ohalo II, a hunter-gatherers' sedentary camp on the shore of the Sea of Galilee, Israel.
- c. 16,000 BP / 14,000 BC – Wisent (bison) sculpted in clay deep inside the cave now known as Le Tuc d'Audoubert in the French Pyrenees near what is now the border of Spain.
- c. 14,800 BP / 12,800 BC – The Humid Period begins in North Africa. The region that would later become the Sahara is wet and fertile, and the aquifers are full.

=== Mesolithic/Epipaleolithic ===
- c. 12,500 to 9,500 BC – Natufian culture: a culture of sedentary hunter-gatherers who may have cultivated rye in the Levant (Eastern Mediterranean)

=== Neolithic ===
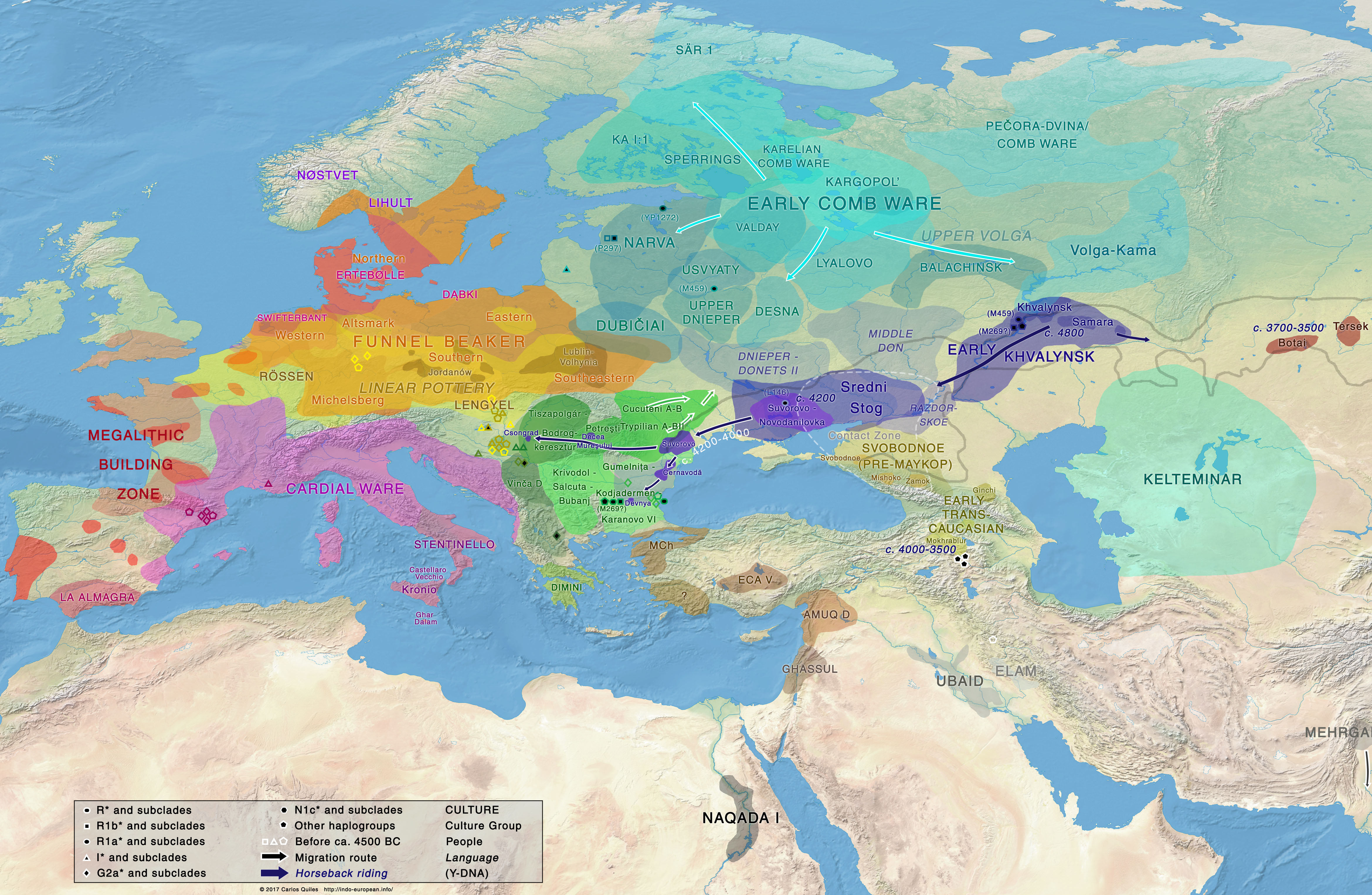
Neolithic migrations in Europe c. 5000–4000 BC. The people of the Proto-Indo-European Sredny Stog culture were the result of a genetic admixture between the Eastern hunter-gatherers and Caucasus hunter-gatherers.

- c. 9,400–9,200 BC – Figs of a parthenocarpic (and therefore sterile) type are cultivated in the early Neolithic village Gilgal I (in the Jordan Valley, 13 km north of Jericho). The find predates the domestication of wheat, barley, and legumes, and may thus be the first known instance of agriculture.
- c. 9,000 BC – Circles of T-shaped stone pillars erected at Göbekli Tepe in the Southeastern Anatolia Region of Turkey during pre-pottery Neolithic A (PPNA) period. As yet unexcavated structures at the site are thought to date back to the epipaleolithic.
- c. 8,000–7,000 BC – In northern Mesopotamia, now northern Iraq, cultivation of barley and wheat begins. At first they are used for beer, gruel, and soup, eventually for bread. In early agriculture at this time the planting stick is used, but it is replaced by a primitive plough in subsequent centuries. Around this time, a round stone tower, now preserved at about 8.5 meters high and 8.5 meters in diameter is built in Jericho.
- c. 4,700–4,500 BC In Central Europe Neolithic circulars emerge.

=== Chalcolithic ===
- c. 3,700 BC – Pictographic proto-writing, known as proto-cuneiform, appears in Sumer, and records begin to be kept. According to the majority of specialists, the first Mesopotamian writing (actually still pictographic proto-writing at this stage) was a tool for record-keeping that had little connection to the spoken language.
- c. 3,300 BC – Approximate date of death of "Ötzi the Iceman", found preserved in ice in the Ötztal Alps in 1991. A copper-bladed axe, which is a characteristic technology of this era, was found with the corpse.
- c. 3,100 BC – Skara Brae is constructed. This stone-built village consisted of ten clustered houses with stone hearths, beds, cupboards, and an ancient sewer system. This village was occupied for 600 years before being abandoned in c. 2,500 BC.
- c. 3,000 BC – Stonehenge construction begins. In its first version, it consisted of a circular ditch and bank, with 56 wooden posts.
- c. 3,000 BC – The Yamnaya expansions from the Pontic–Caspian steppe into Europe and Asia. These migrations are thought to have spread Yamnaya Steppe pastoralist ancestry and Indo-European languages across large parts of Eurasia.

== By region ==
Simplified phylogeny of Homo sapiens for the last two million years

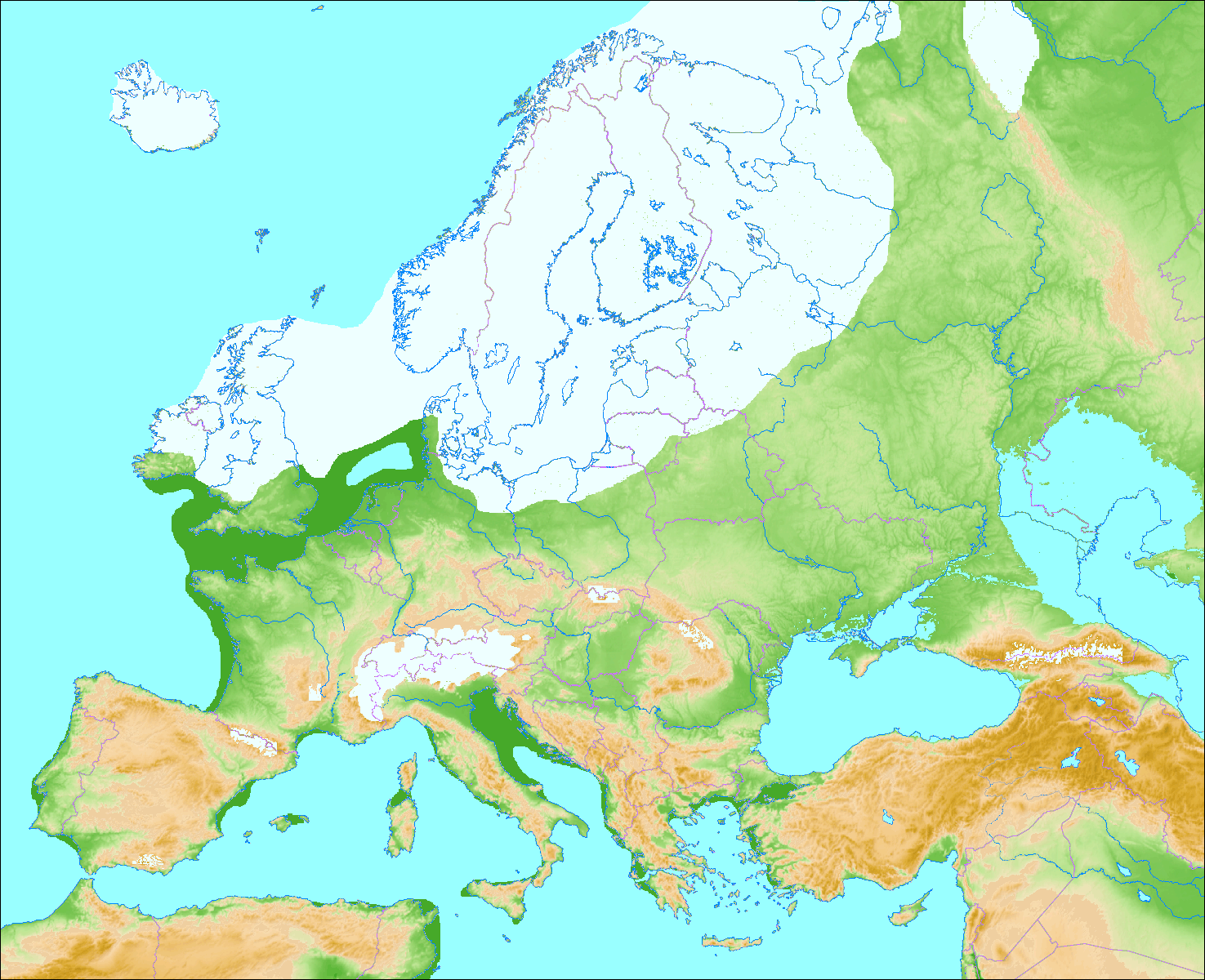
Map of Europe during the Würm glaciation 70–20 thousand years ago

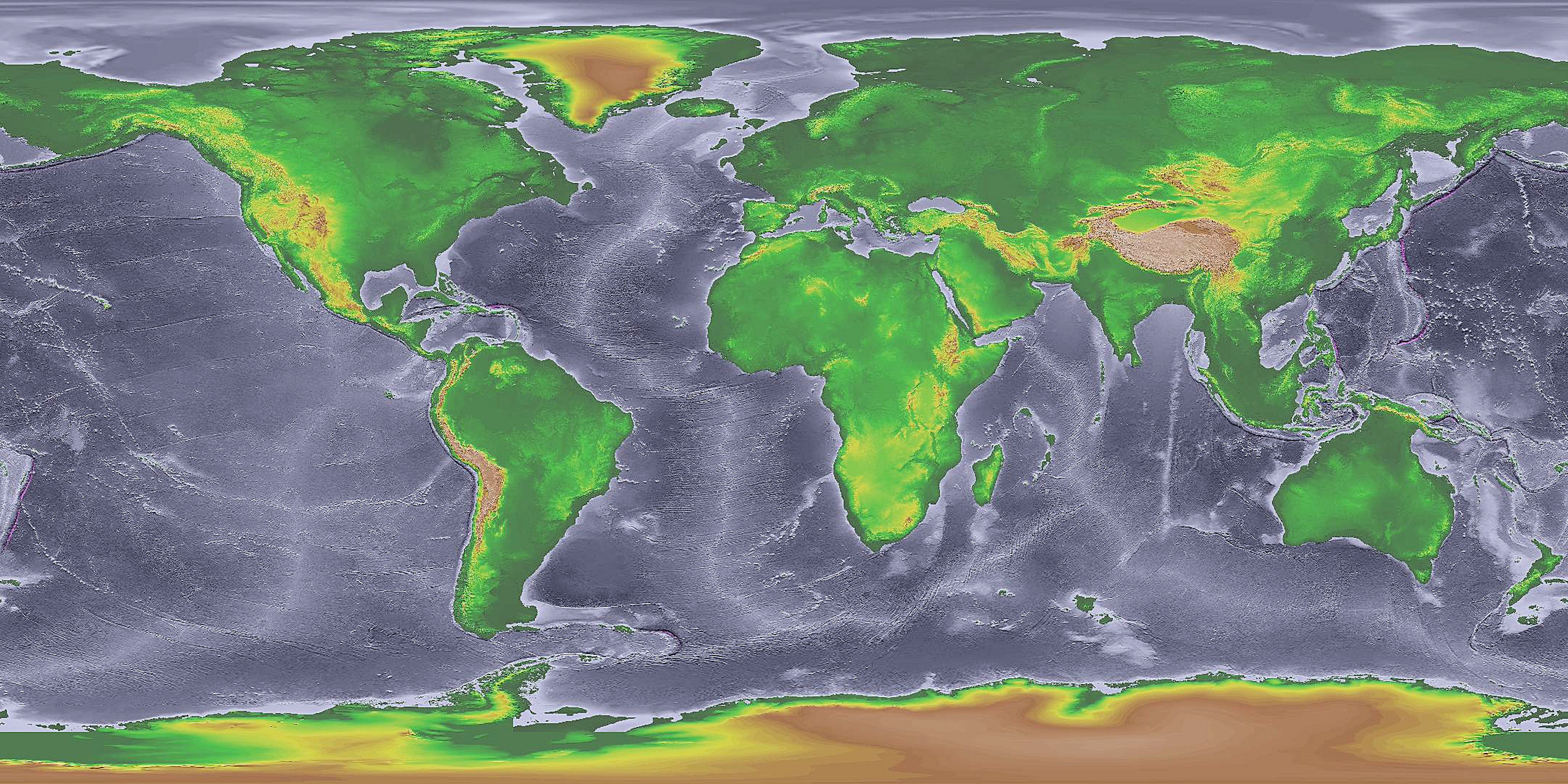
Global sea level during the Last Glacial Period

Map of the world in 2000 BC showing the bronze working area

Old World

- Prehistoric Africa
  - Predynastic Egypt
  - Prehistoric Central North Africa
- Prehistoric Asia
  - East Asia
    - Prehistoric China
    - Prehistoric Korea
    - Japanese Paleolithic
    - East Asian Bronze Age
    - Chinese Bronze Age
  - South Asia
    - Indus Valley Civilization
    - South Asian Stone Age
    - Prehistory of Sri Lanka
  - Prehistory of Central Asia
  - Prehistoric Siberia
  - Southeast Asia
    - Prehistoric Indonesia
    - Prehistoric Thailand
  - Southwest Asia (Near East)
    - Prehistory of Iran
    - Aurignacian
    - Natufian culture
    - Ubaid period
    - Uruk period
    - Ancient Near East
- Prehistoric Europe
  - Prehistoric Caucasus
    - Prehistoric Georgia
    - Prehistoric Armenia
  - Paleolithic Europe
  - Neolithic Europe
  - Bronze Age Europe
  - Iron Age Europe
  - Atlantic fringe
    - Prehistoric Britain
    - Prehistoric Ireland
    - Prehistoric Iberia
  - Prehistoric Balkans

New World

- Pre-Columbian Americas
  - Prehistoric Southwestern cultural divisions
  - 2nd millennium BC in North American prehistory
  - 1st millennium BC in North American prehistory
  - 1st millennium in North American prehistory
  - Prehistory of Newfoundland and Labrador
  - Prehistory of the Canadian Maritimes
  - Prehistory of Quebec
- Oceania
  - Prehistoric Australia
  - Prehistoric New Zealand
  - Ancient Hawaii

== See also ==
- Archaic humans
- Band society
- History of the family
- Human evolution
- List of Stone Age art
- Paleoanthropology
- Pantribal sodality
- Prehistoric medicine
- Prehistoric music
- Prehistoric religion
- Prehistoric warfare
- Younger Dryas
- Uncontacted peoples
