= Prehistory of Newfoundland and Labrador =

At the end of the last Ice Age, Newfoundland and Labrador were covered in thick ice sheets. The province has had a continuous human presence for approximately 5000 years. Although Paleo-Indians are known from Nova Scotia dating back 11,000 years, no sites have been found north of the St. Lawrence. The oldest traces of human activity, in the form of quartz and quartzite knives, were discovered in 1974 in southern Labrador, but some archaeologists have speculated that a human presence may go back as much as 9000 years. Highly acidic soils have destroyed much of the bone and other organic material left behind by early humans and thus complicates archaeological research.

== Maritime Archaic period ==
Cultural differentiation began to take place in Newfoundland beginning around 7500 years ago. A gravesite at Port au Choix dated to 3500 years ago contains stone, antler and ivory tools, ornaments and weapons indicative of a sea-based culture. Construction of a theater in 1967 prompted an extensive archaeological dig that revealed 90 skeletons and 3000 artifacts. Many of the skeletons were children under the age of two, while others were elderly with evidence of arthritis. Most skeletons were found to be buried with red ochre, white quartz pebbles, weapons and other ornaments.

Chipped stone tools were uncommon at the Port au Choix site. Instead, archaeologists found polished slate spears hypothesized to be used for piercing the thick blubber of marine mammals. Teeth, bones and claws were discovered from seals, walruses, caribou, beavers, foxes, and martens as well as birds such as geese, ducks, gulls, terns, swans and other species. People at the Port au Choix site likely hunted harp seals when hundreds of thousands arrived on the pack ice in February and March, using clubs and spears, and then shifted to migratory birds in the late spring. One grave contained the bills of 200 great auks. Dr. Leslie Tuck from the Canadian Wildlife Service suggested that the birds were blown ashore by high winds and hunted. Archaic peoples may have shifted to salmon in rivers in the summer and hunted caribou throughout the year. Hares, ptarmigan, beaver and wild berries gathered during the summer seem to have comprised other parts of the Archaic diet.

Archaic peoples wore bones, teeth and skulls from foxes and bears, kept large numbers of amethyst, quartz and calcite crystals, and in one grave had carved an orca figurine from igneous rock. Graphite pebbles were used for markings and Archaic peoples produced bone flutes. Evidence for Archaic peoples is found most recently 3890 years ago, with possible small campsites more recently from 3500 years ago along Lake Melville.

== Paleo-Eskimos ==
Little evidence of pre-Dorset Eskimo culture exists in Newfoundland and Labrador, but Dorset sites are well-studied. Triangular end blades, probably used in barbed spears are commonly found at Dorset sites. Sod houses concentrated near the coast to take advantage of bearded seals and ringed seals close into the coast at the end of the pack ice season between May and July, as well as for hunting sea birds, salmon and Arctic char in the summer.

Many sites had separated tents and houses, but today only central stone hearths are well-preserved. Radiocarbon dating indicates that Dorset Eskimos migrated from northern Labrador southward around 4000 years ago, reducing the range of Maritime Archaic Indians. Possibility as a result of large scale die-off, return migration, or several years of poor conditions, Paleo-Eskimos disappear from the archaeological record about 3500 years ago.

Dorset Eskimos are known over a span of 1500 years in northern Quebec and Labrador, as well as around the coast of Newfoundland. Labrador sites are less common after 1800 years ago, but Dorset populations grew in Newfoundland during the same period. Unlike other cultures, Dorset sites are well preserved and include bone scraps, tools and parts of houses. Some sites had as many as 36 houses and sites appear to have been long-term base camps for regional hunting and fishing.

Numerous artifacts date to the Dorset period, including soapstone bowls and lamps, polished chert, harnesses and whale bone sled skis. An absence of dog bones suggests that humans would have pulled larger sleds. Dorset settlement ended in the region 1000 years ago.

== Beothuk settlement ==
Archaeologists debate whether the Beothuk people were descended from Maritime Archaic peoples, or if they arrived in Newfoundland sometime in last millennia. Shifting sand dunes at Cape Freels have preserved the best evidence of Beothuk culture, including stone house rings, fire-cracked rocks, chert flakes and some artifacts. Rising sea levels appears to have eliminated any earlier Archaic records from Cape Freels. Beothuk people and Dorset Eskimos overlapped in Newfoundland for a period of 500 years.

The Cape Freels site is proposed as a stopping point during the annual Beothuk hunt to take advantage of a freshwater pond where migratory birds would land in large numbers. No bone tools have been recovered in the time span from 3200 to 500 years ago, although researchers discovered Beothuk harpoon heads made of iron, in the Newfoundland Museum, that closely resembled Dorset harpoons.

== Naskapi settlement ==
Naskapi peoples, who overlapped with the Innu (also known as Montagnais people) until the 20th century, arrived in Labrador at an unknown time in the past. In the 1970s, William Fitzhugh proposed that Naskapi could be traced back 1,000 years before European contact in the Hamilton Inlet. Archaeological research suggests that Naskapi people lived along the coast of Labrador, hunting sea mammals, birds and fish along with large land mammals. Naskapi archaeological remains are sparse but include side-scrapers and simple flake knives, often made from Ramah chert from northern Labrador.

Campsites seem to have been small, with only a few families living in tents surrounding rock-lined hearths. During a campsite excavation by Fitzhugh, charcoal was dated back to 1230 CE. Until the early 20th century, Naskapi relied on an annual caribou hunt to provide enough food for the winter, as well as skins to make tents and clothing. Caribou also provided sinew and antlers as raw materials for tools. During years with poor hunting conditions, families might disperse across the barrens to search for food. By the early 20th century, caribou herds were decimated limiting this way of life. Archaeological evidence gathered in the 1970s and before found campsites near the coast but did not have clear explanations for the shift to more inland hunting by the time of widespread European contact.

== Thule and Labrador Inuit ==
The Labrador Inuit arrived 500 years ago, as a branch of Thule expansion. In the 1920s, Junius Bird, a researcher with the American Museum of Natural History, surveyed parts of the Labrador coast and discovered and excavated the ruins of sod houses. Evidence at the site indicated that it was an extension of Thule culture, along with some ruins initially thought to be Norse, excavated on Sculpin Island by V. Tanner. Research in the 1960s and 1970s revealed rectangular depressions in the ground at a grassy site in Saglek Bay and hundreds of stone graves on islands, coves and headlands around the bay. The area around Saglek Bay records extensive contains a full sequence of houses, waste dumps, and artifacts spanning from the 16th century to the early 20th century.

== See also ==
- L'Anse aux Meadows
