= Prehistory of the Canadian Maritimes =

Humans have been present in the Canadian Maritime provinces for 10,600 years. In spite of being the first part of Canada to be settled by Europeans, research into the prehistory of the Maritimes did not become extensive until 1969. By the early 1980s, several full-time archaeologists focused on the region.

== Paleo-Indian Period (9000 BCE-7000 BCE) ==
Initially, archaeologists thought that glaciers had not melted away fast enough in the Maritimes for Paleo-Indians to be present. However, discoveries at Camp Debert (now known as CFS Debert, site of Canada's retired Maritimes "Diefenbunker") a military base in Colchester County, Nova Scotia after World War II changed that thinking. Researchers from the Peabody Foundation for Archaeology in Andover, Massachusetts, discovered stone flakes and projectile points exposed by bulldozing and wind erosion. While Camp Debert was the major find, archaeologists subsequently found fluted pointed at Kingsclear and Quaco Head in New Brunswick, at Souris, Prince Edward Island and Cape Blomidon on the Bay of Fundy in Nova Scotia. Although the Paleo-Indians at Camp Debert likely lived in a tundra environment, wood was plentiful enough to leave large amounts of charcoal at the site.

George MacDonald, director of the Debert Archaeological Project in 1968 interpreted hearths and shallow pits as simple wooden structures, used as part of a winter encampment, and likely covered in hides. While mastodons may have been present, inhabitants of the Debert site likely hunted caribou with fluted spears and darts. Large stones were used to break bones to extract marrow, while biface tools would have found use cutting meat. Caribou herds in central Nova Scotia may have migrated inland for the winter from Cobequid Bay, to higher altitudes where high winds reduced snow cover. Archaeologists debate whether Debert site Paleo-Indians stored food through the winter and the extent of shell fishing, seal and bird hunting. Paleo-Indian presence is limited in the archaeological record for several thousand years, although archaeologist David Keenlyside found triangular spear tips in Prince Edward Island dated to the period.

== Late Pre-Ceramic Period (3000 BCE-500 BCE) ==
Because there was never extensive farming in the Maritimes to divide the Archaic from other periods of human prehistory, archaeologists use the Late Pre-Ceramic period as a regional period to subdivide the Archaic period.

=== Laurentian culture ===
The Laurentian culture, identified from the St. Lawrence River valley, New York, Ontario and Vermont also extended into inland New Brunswick, the area near Chaleur Bay and possibly parts of coastal Nova Scotia. Ulu stone knives, polished stone gouges and axes, as well as slate spear points are all defining artifacts of the culture. Laurentian peoples seem to have adapted to a coniferous forest and hunted white-tailed deer and moose, supplemented by rabbit, beaver, fox, martin, pike and sucker fish. However, Laurentian peoples are still poorly understood in the Maritimes.

=== Maritime Archaic culture ===
Sea level rise as a result of isostatic uplift has hidden much of the evidence of Maritime Archaic peoples who may have spanned and traded from Maine to Newfoundland and occupied much of coastal Nova Scotia. The Turner Farm site in Maine offers artifact dates of 2500 BCE to 2400 BCE and similar artifacts were found in Rafter Lake outside of Halifax. The Maritime Archaic diet is understood from sites on Monhegan Island in Maine, where the remains of swordfish, harbor seals, gray seals, sturgeon, codfish, sea mink and sea birds were discovered. By 2500 BCE, Maritime Archaic peoples had developed barbed harpoons to catch sea mammals and large numbers of harpoons remained at the site. Although no evidence of houses or tents remain, Maritime Archaic totems and religious amulets have been found, sourced from the sea. By 3500 years ago, Maritime Archaic people and technology such as slate spears disappeared from the region.

=== Shield culture ===
Mostly found in the boreal forests of the Canadian Shield, Shield peoples may have inhabited two sites in the Maritimes. Dead Man's Pool—a salmon pool on the Tobique River in New Brunswick—preserved large spear points for catching fish and thin, flake scrapers for processing fish. In addition to catching fish, the Shield peoples at Dead Man's Pool likely processed hides and killed larger animals such as caribou. Field plowing at Cape North on Cape Breton revealed the McEvoy site, which preserved a few scrapers, knives and biface blades. Archaeologists have debated whether or not the two sites are actually remnants of the Shield culture.

=== Susquehanna culture ===
The Susquehanna peoples used slate and argillite tools, similar to those used on the Piedmont plateau further south in the eastern US and left artifacts along the Bay of Fundy coast in New Brunswick. Unlike other Maritime groups they cremated the dead and buried bones and ashes away from the cremation pit. Archaeologists have debated whether the Susquehanna peoples ultimately became Mi'kmaq or Maliseet, or whether they faded out of the region.

== Ceramic Period (500 BCE-1500 CE) ==
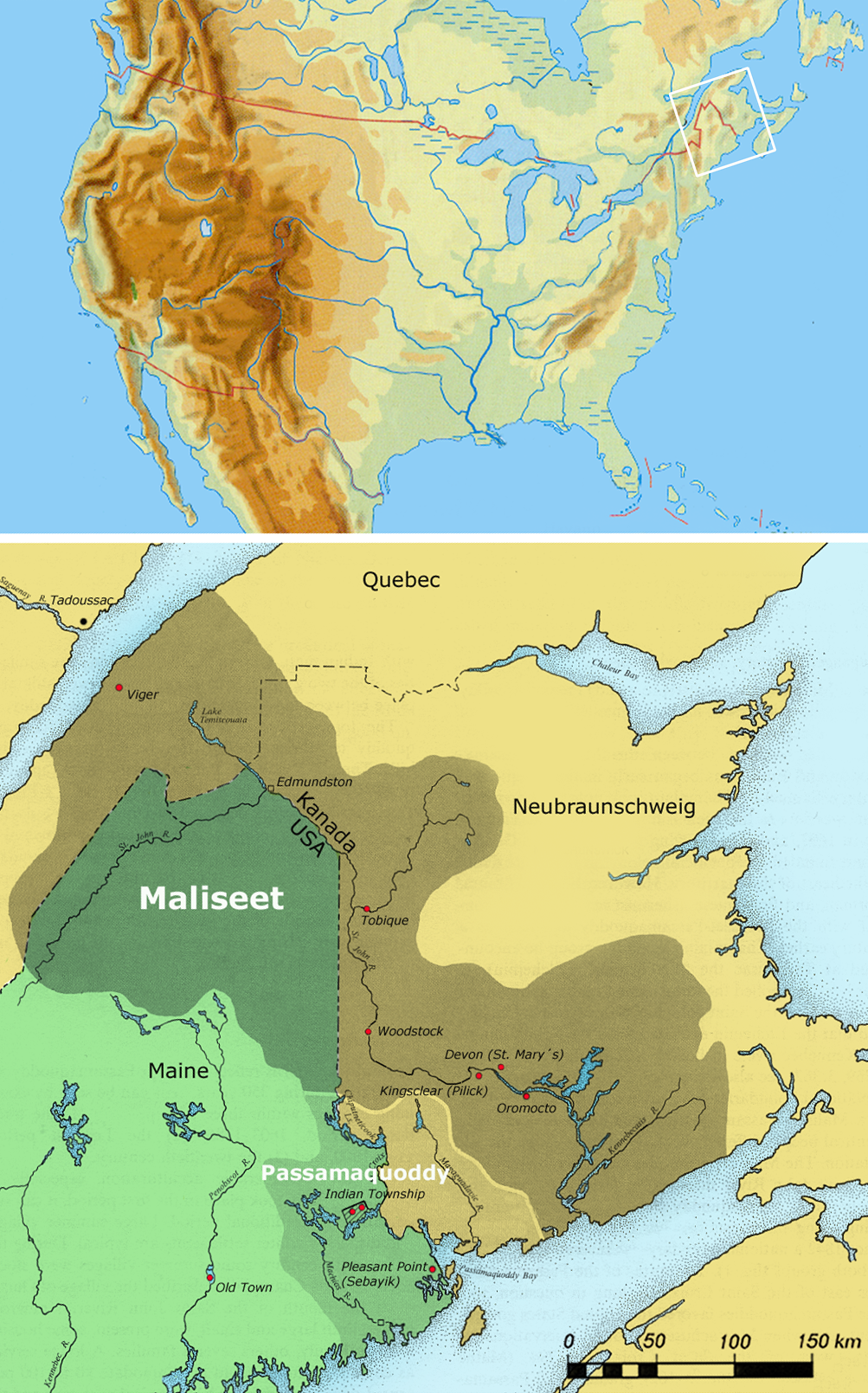
Maliseet & Passamaquoddy Territory

In the Ceramic Period, a regional archaeological term, modern native cultures of the Maritimes began to take shape. Maliseet people were predominant in southwest Nova Scotia and southern New Brunswick, spanning both shores of the Bay of Fundy, while Mi'kmaq lived throughout the rest of New Brunswick, Prince Edward Island and Nova Scotia. New stone tools designed to be mounted to a shaft appeared in southern New Brunswick several hundred years before the introduction of pottery. Pre-Ceramic technology faded out of the area, with some of the last remains at Teacher's Cove and St. Croix Island, proposed as staging grounds for marine mammal hunts by researcher David Sanger. When ceramics appeared, they had round bottoms and were marked with cords. The heaviness of clay cooking pots may have limited mobility and some groups seem to have abandoned clay vessels in exchange for birch bark containers. At the time of European contact, many people quickly gave up on clay pots and switched to copper kettles. Pots were tempered with crushed granite, which left behind glittering quartz and mica.

Maliseet lifestyles are inferred from European historical records. Groups spent winter inland hunting deer, moose and beaver and relocated to the rivers and the ocean during the spring, summer and fall. However, archaeological evidence suggests that this was a change in the seasonal pattern shortly before European explorers arrived. David Sanger launched a survey of inland ponds, but did not find signs of seasonal encampments. He suggested that settlements might instead have concentrated on the ocean, with warm weather fishing for smelt, herring, gaspereau and salmon. Sanger discovered oval pit houses in Bocabec on the New Brunswick coast, with tunnel-like entrance, a sunken hearth and layers of gravel laid down internally probably for sanitation.

Middens preserve thousands of soft clam shells, oldsquaw ducks, common murre and great auk bones along the New Brunswick coast. Flat bone needles were used to weave mats and snowshoe webbing. Shell middens on Prince Edward Island, excavated by the David Keenlyside and Judy Buxton Keenlyside in the 1970s indicate small summer Mi'kmaq encampments. The Oxbow site, on a tributary of the Miramichi River displays polished stone-axes, snub-nosed scrapers and arrow points for hafting. Mi'kmaq sites have some technological differences, such as bark peelers, knives made out of beaver teeth and different awls and needles.

Clay pipes traded from tribes in Ohio were found in Dartmouth, Nova Scotia in the 1930s. In 1972, Joseph Augustine, a resident of the Red Bank First Nations Reserve in New Brunswick directed archaeologists to a burial mound that contained four skeletons, more than a thousand copper beads, a slate gorget and preserved fabric. The rectangular slate gorget contained two drilled holes, similar to the Adena burial cult in the Ohio River valley.

== Bibliography ==
- Tuck, James A. (1984). Maritime Provinces Prehistory. Ottawa: Archaeological Survey of Canada. OCLC 56225694.
- Wright, James Vallière (1979). Six Chapters of Canada's Prehistory. Archaeological Survey of Canada. ISBN 0-6600-0005-9.
