= Prehistory of Quebec =

Humans have inhabited Quebec for 11,000 years beginning with the de-glaciated areas of the St. Lawrence River valley and expanding into parts of the Canadian Shield after glaciers retreated 5,000 years ago. Quebec has almost universally acidic soils that destroy bone and many other traces of human activity, complicating archaeological research together with development in parts of southern Quebec. Archaeological research only began in earnest in the 1960s and large parts of the province remain poorly researched.

Southern Quebec was influenced by Indian cultures, closely related to Ontario, New York, New England and Newfoundland, while northern Quebec has an Inuit influence.

== Paleo-Indian Period (9000 BCE–5000 BCE) ==
Clovis culture remnants have been discovered in Ontario, New York and Vermont, but not in Quebec. At the end of the Pleistocene, Quebec was still covered in glaciers and the Champlain Sea. Plano cultures are better attested, with sites in the Gaspé Peninsula and some of the upper St. Lawrence islands. Stone flakes and unfinished tools litter the mining site in the Gaspe. One dig uncovered hammerstones, iron pyrite nodules, scrapers and knives. The pyrite nodules showed signs of use as fire starters, struck against flint to create sparks. Plano Paleo-Indians likely hunted caribou, owing to the region's subarctic climate.

== Archaic Period (5000 BCE–1000 BCE) ==
Three major Archaic cultures occupied Quebec and interacted. Archaeologists in the 1970s proposed that the Laurentian and Maritime cultures may have developed out of Clovis culture and seemed to have an orientation toward the sea. The third group, the Shield culture, may have stemmed from Plano groups and occupied land left open by retreating glaciers.

=== Laurentian culture ===
Excavations of Laurentian burials in Quebec and New York suggest a culture that lasted for 4,000 years. Human remains reveal arthritis, bone fractures and in particular gum disease and missing teeth indicative of a coarse diet. Some bodies showed signs of violent death, including headless skeletons, fractured skulls and projectiles lodged in ribs. One site in New York even contained a skeleton that shows signs of surgery to remove a projectile point from the skull. Archaeologists have inferred a seasonal schedule of fishing, berry picking, gathering nuts, passenger pigeon trapping and hunting deer, elk, beaver, and bear as well as collecting shellfish. Very little remains of Laurentian winter housing and acidic soil has destroyed remains of transient summer encampments.

Plowing often unearths Laurentian remains. In the Ottawa River two fishing camps and cemeteries were discovered, dated to 3300 BCE and 2750 BCE. Because of limestone in the area, soil acid was neutralized, preserving bone, as well as a bird bone flute, axes, fish-hooks, atl-atl weights, drills, knives and scrapers. Trade relations with Shield dwellers, near native copper deposits on Lake Superior are inferred from a large number of copper flakes at Laurentian sites from nuggets.

=== Shield culture ===
Hardly any physical artifacts or bones remain from the Shield peoples due to acidic soil, aside from fire-cracked rocks and stone tools. However, archaeologists have determined a diet of fish and caribou—with caribou hunting at narrow spots in the rivers where the animals would ford the water. Shield people likely used birchbark canoes to traverse lakes in the summer and snowshoes in the winter and may have been the ancestors of the Cree, Ojibwe and Montagnais. Shield people in the north would have had more connections with Paleo-Eskimos, although they did occupy part of Lake St. John at the same time as Maritime Indians. In addition to copper trading, there is evidence of flint trade from flint flakes in New York sourced to northern Quebec.

=== Maritime culture ===
Maritime peoples occupied the St. Lawrence River valley and may have extended as far east as Prehistory of Newfoundland and Labrador. Sea level rise in the Holocene flooded coastal remnants of Clovis culture in New England and Quebec. Skeletal remains from Newfoundland suggest high child mortality and a coarse diet leading to gum decay and tooth loss. Low burial mounds made out of sand and cobbles were found in northeastern Quebec on the shore of the Gulf of St. Lawrence near Labrador. Acid soil had destroyed the bone in those sites, but one mound in Labrador yielded a 12 year old child, buried face down with grave offerings such as graphite paintstones, an antler pestle, projectile points, knives and the oldest toggle harpoon in the world. Preserved charred bones and the discovery of the toggle harpoon suggest more walrus hunting than capelin and salmon fishing. Maritime Indians might have consumed stranded whales periodically.

Ramah quartzite from Labrador was traded to the Maritime peoples in the St. Lawrence and as far south as Maine and Ft. Lennox on the Richelieu River. Many research questions remain about the Maritime culture including its relationship with neighboring cultures, the extent of contact with Laurentian peoples at Trois-Rivières and whether these groups became Algonquin.

== Paleo-Eskimo and Thule Eskimo cultures ==
Paleo-Eskimos spread rapidly from Alaska to northern Quebec approximately 4000 years ago and occupied the coast for 3500 years. They reached Poste-de-la-Baleine by 1500 BCE and the Hamilton Inlet in Labrador by 1800 BCE. Sites contain the remains of circular tent-rings and large deposits of marine mammal bones, but very little physical remains of inland caribou. Some sites are dated based on altitude, with the oldest sites at the highest points due to isostatic rebound after the weight of glaciers disappeared. As a result, Poste-de-la-Baleine is 69 meters above sea level.

Paleo-Eskimos in Quebec shifted to being Dorset cultures, exploiting a warm period between 850 BCE and 350 CE. Houses from the Dorset period are larger and may have housed extended families. The Dorset people continued Paleo-Eskimo traditions, such as using toggling harpoons and kept a small breed of dog. In addition to seal and walrus, they hunted beluga whales, polar bears, caribou, birds and foxes. Dorset peoples carved small pieces of ivory into the shape of animals and humans.

Thule people slowly displaced Dorset groups, although they overlapped in the same region. Thule peoples extracted large amounts of food from the ocean by whaling and occupied the coast from James Bay to Labrador. Expansion of sea ice and attacks by Montagnais and Micmacs caused them to give up whaling and retreat to northern Labrador around the time of European contact. During the whaling period, Thules constructed large winter villages with partly subterranean homes built out of whale ribs and jaws supporting sod roofs. Unlike Paleo-Eskimos, Thules used boulders to build homes and preferred slate tools to napped stone tools.

== Woodland Period (1000 BCE–European contact) ==
The Woodland period in Quebec begins with the arrival of pottery. Laurentian peoples were among the first to adopt pottery and transition in the archaeological record to more advanced technology. Pottery is common on the western edge of the Canadian Shield, the Eastern Townships and the upper St. Lawrence River, but scarce or non-existent near the Gulf. Archaeologists in Quebec have struggled to make sense of ceramic artifacts, which are more complicated to interpret than in neighboring regions (Newfoundland never adopted pottery and it occurs only rarely in Labrador). For instance, Shield peoples in the western part of Quebec used pottery, but Shield groups further north and east did not. As a result, archaeologists divide Quebec's Woodland period into the Initial Woodland from 1000 BCE to 1000 CE and the Terminal Woodland, which refers to Montagnais and St. Lawrence Iroquois people.

=== Meadowood culture ===
Meadowood culture is attested from burials in Quebec, Vermont and New York and probably descended from Laurentian peoples. Cremation overtook burial and the dead were surrounded by copper and stone trinkets. Poorly understood carved slate birds appeared in the period and bows and arrows slowly replaced atl-atls. Ochre, limonite and graphite possibly used for body paint have also been found. Freshwater clam, moose, turtle, beaver and black bear remains were found in a badly eroded Meadowood campsite in Trois-Rivieres.

=== Point Peninsula culture ===
Point Peninsula sites are distributed throughout the St. Lawrence, but often have not been extensively researched. Pottery was made with collars and pressed marks, with many different designs. A burnt and buried braid basket was discovered still intact at one site. Archaeologists unearthed a few harpoons, stone net-sinkers and bone fish-hooks. Point Peninsula people smoked a wide range of plants for medicinal purposes and burned hawthorn bark to lure deer and woolly yarrow during ceremonies.

=== Laurel culture ===
Laurel peoples, Shield Archaic people who adopted pottery spanned northern Ontario, much of Manitoba and parts of Saskatchewan. No bone tools remain although stone tools indicate a similar lake-based lifestyle. Laurel peoples are mostly known from their pottery, introduced from the south but very different in style because cord was never used to mark the clay.
