= Archaeological Survey of Canada =

Division of the Canadian Museum of History

- Type: Division of the Canadian Museum of Civilization
- Purpose: Preservation of archaeological sites and research on the history of the native peoples of Canada
- Location: Canada

The Archaeological Survey of Canada is a division of the Canadian Museum of History. Its mandate is the preservation of archaeological sites and research and publication on the history of the native peoples of Canada. The survey was established in 1971.
