= Pre-Dorset =

Paleo-Eskimo cultures in the Canadian Arctic

The Pre-Dorset were a Paleo-Eskimo culture or group of cultures that existed in the Eastern Canadian Arctic from c. 3200 to 850 cal BCE, and preceded the Dorset culture.

Owing to its vast geographical expanse and the relatively short history of research, the Pre-Dorset is difficult to define. The term was coined by Collins (1956, 1957), who recognised that there seemed to be people who lived in the Eastern Canadian Arctic prior to the Dorset but for whose culture it was difficult to give the defining characteristics. Hence, for Collins and others afterward, the term is a catch-all phrase for all occupations of the Eastern Canadian Arctic that predated the Dorset. To Taylor (1968) and Maxwell (1973), however, the Pre-Dorset were a distinct cultural entity, ancestral to the Dorset, who lived in the Low Arctic of Canada with a number of incursions into High Arctic.

At the site of Port Refuge on the Grinnell Peninsula, Devon Island, McGhee distinguished two sets of occupations, one that he ascribed to the Independence I culture, the other to Pre-Dorset. Owing to the often poor preservation of organic material and the fact that bones from marine mammals can appear older with radiocarbon dating than their actual age (the marine reservoir effect), it is typically difficult to date Arctic sites. But the Independence I settlement is several metres higher above sea level, and McGhee took this to mean that the Independence I settlement was roughly 300 years older than the Pre-Dorset one at Port Refuge. Indeed, assuming that settlers are always close to the water, because sea levels fell over the centuries older sites are expected to lie higher above the sea. Most features that McGhee believed different between the Pre-Dorset and Independence I settlements of Port Refuge are problematic and cannot systematically be used to distinguish their cultural affiliation. It has been suggested that Pre-Dorset and Independence I are parts of the same culture.

== Chronology ==
Maxwell divided the Pre-Dorset into four phases, a scheme refined by Murray:

- Early Pre-Dorset 4450 to 3650 ^{14}C BP (c. 3350-2950 to 2200-1900 cal BCE)
- Middle Pre-Dorset 3650 to 3250 ^{14}C BP (c. 2200-1900 to 1650-1450 cal BCE)
- Late Pre-Dorset 3250 to 2750 ^{14}C BP (c. 1600-1450 to 900-850 cal BCE)
- Terminal or Dorset Transitional Pre-Dorset 2750 to 2450 ^{14}C BP (c. 1000-850 to 750-400 cal BCE)

It is typically difficult to ascribe a Pre-Dorset site to one of these four phases without relying on radiocarbon dates.

== Regional variants ==
=== Canadian Central Low Arctic ===
The Low Eastern Arctic, namely Arctic regions on Baffin Island or to the south, are usually considered the core area of the Pre-Dorset.

=== Canadian High Arctic ===
Most Pre-Dorset occupations are known from the Low Arctic. But the complex is known from a number of occupations in the High Arctic as well, namely to the north of Baffin Island, on the islands of Devon and Ellesmere. One important site, the Port Refuge National Historic Site of Canada, on Devon Island, hosts occupations ascribed to the Pre-Dorset and others ascribed to Independence I. At this site, Pre-Dorset dwellings are clustered and show no mid-passage feature, whereas the Independence I dwellings are arranged linearly with mid-passage features.

=== Greenland ===
The Pre-Dorset is generally restricted to the Low Arctic, and given that incursions to the High Arctic are rare incursions into Greenland from the High Arctic are even rarer. Grønnow and Jensen (2003:42-43) ascribe one small site in Greenland to the Pre-Dorset, the only one to date. This is a mid-passage dwelling in Solbakken, Hall Land, just across from the Nares Strait separating Canada from Greenland. This occupation was identified as Pre-Dorset on the basis of the resharpening technique of the burins, as well as other lithic characteristics. There is an Independence I occupation at the same site that the authors believe more ancient than the Pre-Dorset on grounds of altitude (21 vs. 19 m). It appears probable that surveys or re-analysis of excavated material will reveal more Greenlandic Pre-Dorset occupations.

== Genetics ==
A genetic study published in Science in August 2014 examined the remains of a Pre-Dorset individual buried in Rocky Point, Canada, between c. 2140 BC and 1800 BC. The sample of mtDNA extracted belonged to haplogroup D4e. The examined individual was found to be closely related to peoples of the Saqqaq culture and Dorset culture. The ancestors of the Saqqaq, Pre-Dorset and Dorset probably migrated from Siberia to North America in a single migration around 4000 BC.

== Sources ==
- Maanasa Raghavan; Michael DeGiorgio; Anders Albrechtsen; et al. (29 August 2014). "The genetic prehistory of the New World Arctic" (PDF). Science. 345 (6200): 1255832. doi:10.1126/SCIENCE.1255832. ISSN 0036-8075. PMID 25170159. Wikidata Q29606641.
- McGhee, Robert (1979). Palaeoeskimo Occupations at Port Refuge, High Arctic Canada. University of Ottawa Press. pp. 8–86. doi:10.2307/j.ctt22zmf1t. ISBN 978-1-7728-2087-4. S2CID 134777326.
