= Port Refuge =

Historic site in Nunavut, Canada

- Location in the Canadian Arctic Archipelago Port Refuge (Canada)
- 76°18′0″N 94°43′0″W
- Location: Nunavut, Canada

History
- Established: 19 June 1978

National Historic Site of Canada

Port Refuge is located off the south coast of Grinnell Peninsula in a small bay on the south coast of Devon Island in Nunavut, Canada. The site received its current name by Sir Edward Belcher when he sought refuge there in 1852–1853 from moving ice during his voyage in search of the missing Franklin Expedition.

Port Refuge contains archaeological evidence of early human occupation of the High Arctic over the last 4000 years. There is evidence of Paleo-Eskimo and Pre-Dorset culture occupations. Earliest occupation was Independence I culture at approximately 2000 BCE. There is evidence of the Thule culture occupation from 1200 to 1500 CE.

There is a Thule winter village including five winter houses near the entrance to the bay containing Norse and Asiatic objects. These show evidence of trade with medieval Norse colonies of Greenland.

Port Refuge was designated a National Historic Site of Canada in 1978.
