= Inuksuk Point =

Historic site in Nunavut, Canada

- Inuksugalait (Inuktitut)
- Enukso Point
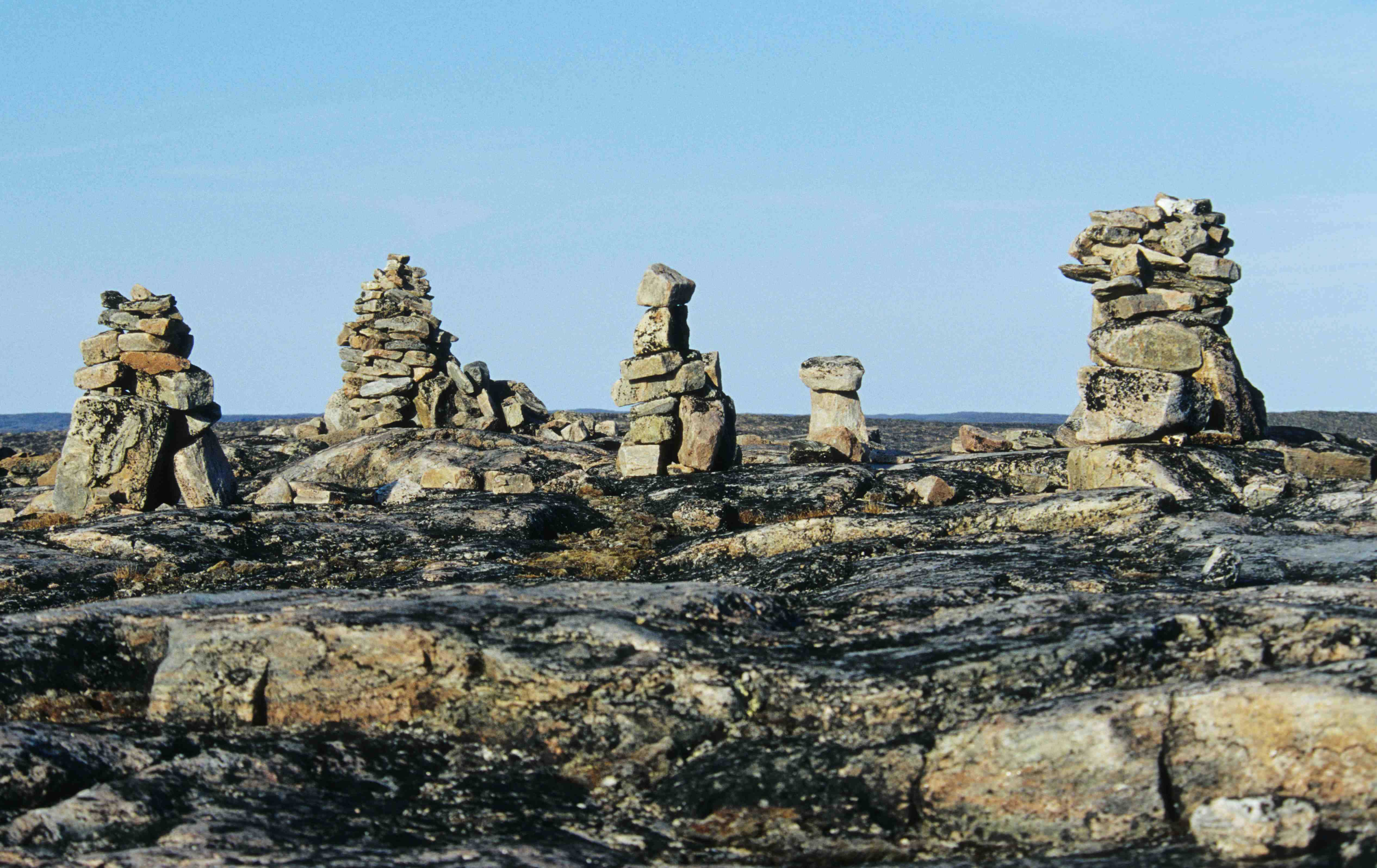
- Inuksuit at the Inuksuk Point

- Inuksuk Point Inuksuk Point (Canada)
- 64°34′N 078°12′W
- Type: Inuksuit
- Location: Nunavut, Canada
- Nearest city: Kinngait

History
- Established: 23 October 1969

National Historic Site of Canada

Inuksuk Point (Enukso Point, Inuksugalait) is a small peninsula on Foxe Peninsula, approximately 88.5 km (55.0 mi) from Kinngait (formerly Cape Dorset) on the southwest of Baffin Island in Nunavut, Canada.

This location is renowned due to a group of more than 100 inuksuit—stone cairns built by Inuit. The site has been a National Historic Site of Canada since 23 October 1969.
