= Arvia'juaq and Qikiqtaarjuk National Historic Site =

Area near Arviat, Nunavut

- ᕿᑭᖅᑖᕐᔪᒃ (Inuktitut)
- Location within Nunavut
- Type: traditional summer gathering place for the Caribou Inuit
- Location: Nunavut, Canada
- Nearest city: Arviat

Site notes
- Governing body: Parks Canada
- Website: https://www.pc.gc.ca/apps/dfhd/page_nhs_eng.aspx?id=836

National Historic Site of Canada
- Designated: 6 July 1995

The Arvia'juaq and Qikiqtaarjuk National Historic Site contains two areas: Arvia'Juaq and Qikiqtaaruk. Arvia'juaq (Sentry Island 61°10′N 093°51′W), an island in Hudson Bay, is located close to Arviat, Nunavut. It is a National Historic Site of Canada and a Caribou Inuit (Paallirmiut) summer camp site. The site is co-managed between the community of Arviat and Parks Canada.

Arvia'Juaq is a traditional summer camp of the Paallirmiut Inuit, and a virtual tour of the National Historic Site was made in 2017:

Qikiqtaarjuk, (Inuktitut syllabics: ᕿᑭᖅᑖᕐᔪᒃ, Inuktitut for little island) is a small peninsula, just north of Arviat, that faces Arvia'juaq. Like Arvia'juaq, Qikiqtaarjuk contains many Paallirmiut artifacts and both are considered ritual, spiritual, and sacred sites. In particular Qikiqtaarjuk is associated with the Inuit hero figure Kiviuq.

== See also ==
- Qikiqtaarjuk
- Igloolik Island § Qikiqtaarjuk, a former island, featured in the film Atanarjuat: The Fast Runner, that is now a peninsula
