= Igloolik Island =

Island in the Qikiqtaaluk Region of Nunavut, Canada

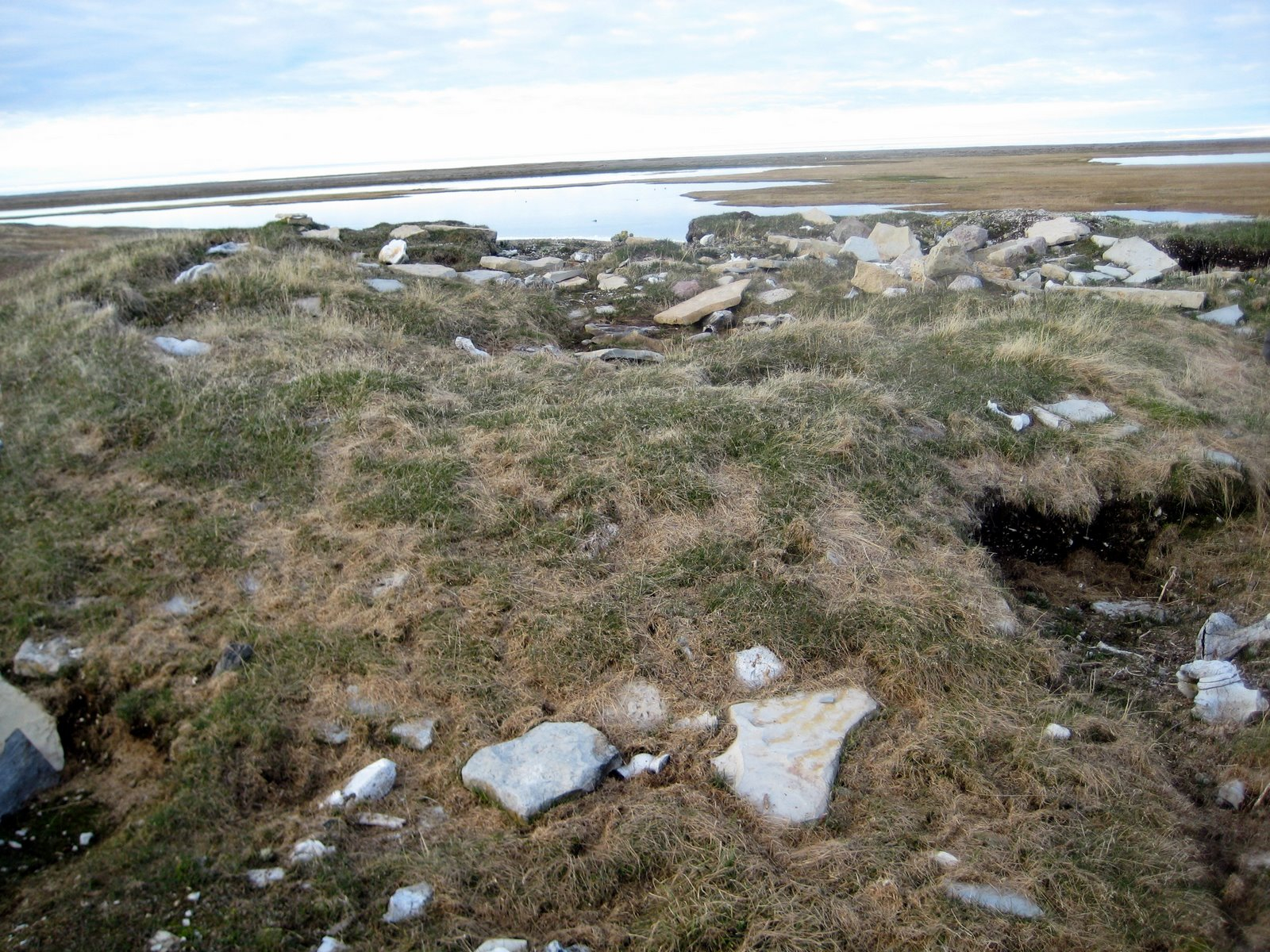
- Remnants of older Inuit sod houses in Igloolik Point

- Location within Nunavut Location within Canada

Geography
- Location: Foxe Basin
- Coordinates: 69°23′N 81°40′W
- Archipelago: Arctic Archipelago

Administration
- Canada
- Nunavut: Nunavut
- Region: Qikiqtaaluk
- Largest settlement: Igloolik

Demographics
- Population: 1,538
- Ethnic groups: Inuit

Igloolik Island is a small island in the Qikiqtaaluk Region of Nunavut, Canada. It is located in the Foxe Basin, very close to the Melville Peninsula (and to a lesser degree, Baffin Island), and it is often thought to be a part of the peninsula. It forms part of the Arctic Archipelago.

The word Igloolik (Inuktitut: "there is an igloo here") comes from iglu (meaning: "house"/"building") and refers to the sod houses (qarmaq) that were originally in the area. Inuit and their ancestors have inhabited the island since 2000 BC. The archaeological sites on the island, which show a sequence up to 1000 AD, were designated a National Historic Site of Canada in 1978.

There is only one community on the island, also named Igloolik.

== Qikiqtaarjuk ==
On the north of Igloolik Island at 69°24′45″N 081°30′07″W is a peninsula called Qikiqtaarjuk (Inuktitut syllabics: ᕿᑭᖅᑖᕐᔪᒃ, 'little island'). About 400 – 500 years ago Qikiqtaarjuk was a separate island but due to isostatic rebound it became part of the main island. Inuit Qaujimajatuqangit (traditional knowledge) says that prior to that there was an even smaller island called Puqtuniq from which the waters receded forming Qikiqtaarjuk. Qikiqtaarjuk is associated with several Inuit legends and stories and was the place from where Atanarjuat starts his run.

== Climate ==
Igloolik has a polar climate (ET) with nine months averaging below 0 °C (32 °F). Winters are long and cold, with October being the snowiest month. Summers range from chilly to sometimes mild, with cold nights.

Climate data for Igloolik (Igloolik Airport) Climate ID: 2402543; coordinates 69°22′N 81°49′W; elevation: 52.7 m (173 ft); 1991–2020 normals
| Month | Jan | Feb | Mar | Apr | May | Jun | Jul | Aug | Sep | Oct | Nov | Dec | Year |
|---|---|---|---|---|---|---|---|---|---|---|---|---|---|
| Record high humidex | −4.2 | −0.6 | −3.9 | 0.3 | 5.6 | 18.7 | 24.3 | 24.5 | 11.2 | 3.4 | −0.5 | −1.5 | 24.5 |
| Record high °C (°F) | −1.0 (30.2) | −1.0 (30.2) | −3.0 (26.6) | 1.5 (34.7) | 7.0 (44.6) | 19.0 (66.2) | 24.5 (76.1) | 25.0 (77.0) | 15.0 (59.0) | 5.0 (41.0) | −0.5 (31.1) | −1.5 (29.3) | 25.0 (77.0) |
| Mean daily maximum °C (°F) | −27.6 (−17.7) | −27.8 (−18.0) | −23.8 (−10.8) | −14.3 (6.3) | −4.5 (23.9) | 4.1 (39.4) | 11.7 (53.1) | 8.8 (47.8) | 1.8 (35.2) | −4.6 (23.7) | −15.0 (5.0) | −21.6 (−6.9) | −9.4 (15.1) |
| Daily mean °C (°F) | −30.9 (−23.6) | −31.0 (−23.8) | −27.7 (−17.9) | −18.4 (−1.1) | −7.8 (18.0) | 1.6 (34.9) | 7.9 (46.2) | 5.8 (42.4) | 0.0 (32.0) | −6.8 (19.8) | −18.4 (−1.1) | −25.4 (−13.7) | −12.6 (9.3) |
| Mean daily minimum °C (°F) | −34.1 (−29.4) | −34.2 (−29.6) | −31.3 (−24.3) | −22.6 (−8.7) | −11.3 (11.7) | −0.9 (30.4) | 4.0 (39.2) | 2.7 (36.9) | −1.9 (28.6) | −9.1 (15.6) | −21.7 (−7.1) | −29.0 (−20.2) | −15.8 (3.6) |
| Record low °C (°F) | −45.0 (−49.0) | −45.5 (−49.9) | −47.0 (−52.6) | −37.5 (−35.5) | −28.0 (−18.4) | −13.5 (7.7) | −1.0 (30.2) | −5.5 (22.1) | −11.0 (12.2) | −22.5 (−8.5) | −36.0 (−32.8) | −42.5 (−44.5) | −47.0 (−52.6) |
| Record low wind chill | −61.0 | −66 | −58 | −49 | −35 | −21 | −4 | −11 | −18 | −50 | −50 | −56 | −66 |
| Average precipitation mm (inches) | 6.6 (0.26) | 7.1 (0.28) | 13.4 (0.53) | 17.0 (0.67) | 15.2 (0.60) | 16.5 (0.65) | 25.7 (1.01) | 34.9 (1.37) | 27.6 (1.09) | 35.0 (1.38) | 18.5 (0.73) | 11.5 (0.45) | 228.9 (9.01) |
| Average rainfall mm (inches) | 0.0 (0.0) | 0.0 (0.0) | 0.0 (0.0) | 0.1 (0.00) | 0.2 (0.01) | 12.8 (0.50) | 25.7 (1.01) | 32.2 (1.27) | 17 (0.7) | 1.3 (0.05) | 0.0 (0.0) | 0.0 (0.0) | 89.2 (3.51) |
| Average snowfall cm (inches) | 6.6 (2.6) | 7.2 (2.8) | 14.0 (5.5) | 17.5 (6.9) | 15.3 (6.0) | 3.8 (1.5) | 0.0 (0.0) | 2.7 (1.1) | 11.7 (4.6) | 33.4 (13.1) | 18.5 (7.3) | 11.6 (4.6) | 142.2 (56.0) |
| Average precipitation days (≥ 0.2 mm) | 4.2 | 4.4 | 6.6 | 7.3 | 6.7 | 7.2 | 9.3 | 10.4 | 9.5 | 11.6 | 7.9 | 6.3 | 91.4 |
| Average rainy days (≥ 0.2 mm) | 0.0 | 0.0 | 0.0 | 0.11 | 0.11 | 5.6 | 9.3 | 9.9 | 5.9 | 0.42 | 0.0 | 0.0 | 31.4 |
| Average snowy days (≥ 0.2 cm) | 4.4 | 4.4 | 6.6 | 7.2 | 6.6 | 1.7 | 0.0 | 0.59 | 4.5 | 10.8 | 7.7 | 6.2 | 60.7 |
| Average relative humidity (%) (at 1500 LST) | 73.3 | 80.5 | 73.2 | — | — | 79.8 | — | — | — | — | 81.4 | 78.6 | — |
Source: Environment and Climate Change Canada Canadian Climate Normals 1991–2020 (Humidex, wind chill, and humidity from Canadian Climate Normals 1981–2010)

== See also ==
- Arvia'juaq and Qikiqtaarjuk National Historic Site, near Arviat in Nunavut formerly, an island but Qikiqtaarjuk is now part of the mainland
- Qikiqtaarjuk
