= Sentry Island =

Island in Nunavut, Canada

- Location within Nunavut Location within Canada

Geography
- Location: Hudson Bay
- Coordinates: 61°10′N 093°51′W
- Archipelago: Arctic Archipelago

Administration
- Canada
- Nunavut: Nunavut
- Region: Kivalliq

Demographics
- Population: Uninhabited

Sentry Island (Arvia'juaq) is one of several Canadian Arctic islands in Nunavut, Canada, within western Hudson Bay. The closest community is Arviat, 13.7 km (8.5 mi) to the west.

The island forms part of the Arvia'juaq and Qikiqtaarjuk National Historic Site and a Caribou (Paallirmiut) Inuit summer camp site. Sentry Island is a popular place for fishing and hunting.

== History ==
The island served as a rest stop for Henry Hudson and his crew during his ill-fated journeys to find the Northwest Passage in 1610–1611.

On July 3, 2018, a man from Arviat was killed in a rare polar bear attack on the island. The man was on the island with his children when the polar bear approached them and attacked, killing 31-year-old Aaron Gibbons. The bear was killed by two others who were also in the area.
