= Grinnell Peninsula =

Peninsula on Devon Island in Nunavut, Canada

Coordinates: 76°40′N 095°00′W

Grinnell Peninsula is a peninsula of northwestern Devon Island in Nunavut, Canada.

It was sighted by the First Grinnell Expedition in 1850 and named "Grinnell Land" after Henry Grinnell, who had co-financed the expedition. The expedition leaders were uncertain at the time if the new land was part of Devon Island, Cornwallis Island, or a previously uncharted island or northern continent. The name was not universally recognized, as British Admiralty charts of 1851 listed it as "Albert Land" (after Prince Albert) based on Royal Navy observations.
