= Qikiqtaarjuk =

Island in Nunavut, Canada

- Location within Nunavut Location within Canada

Geography
- Location: Foxe Basin
- Coordinates: 69°47′14″N 080°42′09″W
- Archipelago: Arctic Archipelago

Administration
- Canada
- Territory: Nunavut
- Region: Qikiqtaaluk

Demographics
- Population: Uninhabited

Qikiqtaarjuk (ᕿᑭᖅᑖᕐᔪᒃ) formerly Deer Island is one of the uninhabited Canadian Arctic islands in the Qikiqtaaluk Region, Nunavut, Canada. The island is located in Foxe Basin just north of Kapuiviit.
