= Prehistory of Siberia =

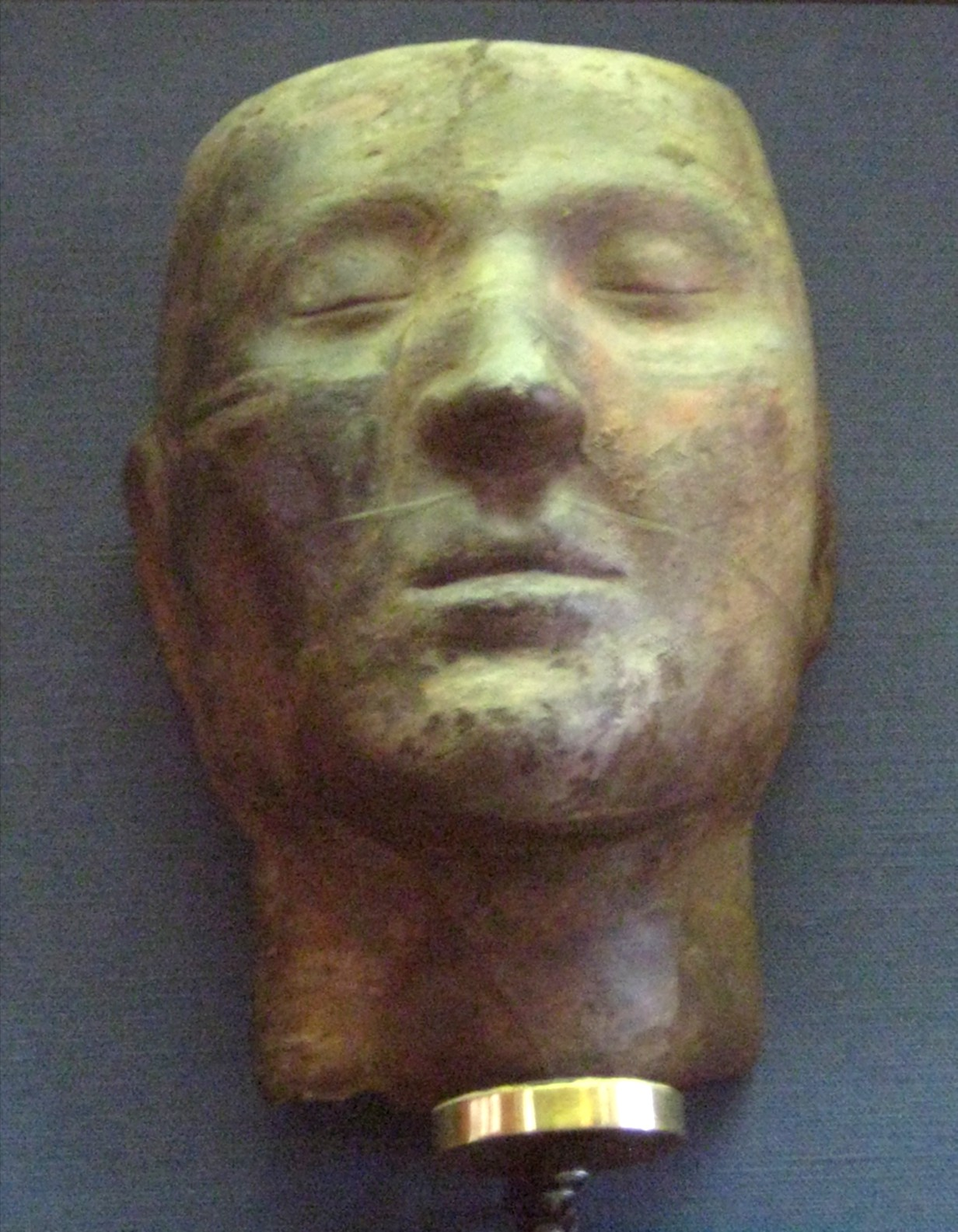
Death mask from a grave of the Tashtyk culture (1st-5th century AD, Minusinsk Hollow)

The Prehistory of Siberia is marked by several archaeologically distinct cultures. In the Chalcolithic, the cultures of western and southern Siberia were pastoralists, while the eastern taiga and the tundra were dominated by hunter-gatherers until the Late Middle Ages and even beyond. Substantial changes in society, economics and art indicate the development of nomadism in the Central Asian steppes in the first millennium BC.

== History of research ==
Scholarly research of the archaeological background of the region between the Urals and the Pacific began in the reign of Peter the Great (1682-1725), who ordered the collection of Scythian gold hoards and thereby rescued the contents of several robbed graves before they were melted down. During his reign, several expeditions were charged with the scientific, anthropological and linguistic research of Siberia, including the Second Kamchatka Expedition of the Danish-born Russian Vitus Bering (1733-1743). Scholars also took an interest in archaeology and carried out the first archaeological excavations of Siberian kurgans. After a temporary reduction of interest in the first half of the nineteenth century, archaeological research in Siberia reached new heights in the late nineteenth century. Excavations were particularly intense in South Siberia and Central Asia. The results of the October Revolution 1917 created different, often restricted, conditions for archaeological research, but led to even larger projects, especially rescue excavations as a result of gigantic building projects. Eventually, even remote areas of the Soviet Union such as Sakha and Chukotka, were archaeologically explored. After the Second World War, these developments continued. Following the Collapse of the Soviet Union in 1991, much more intensive collaboration with the west became possible.

== Topography ==
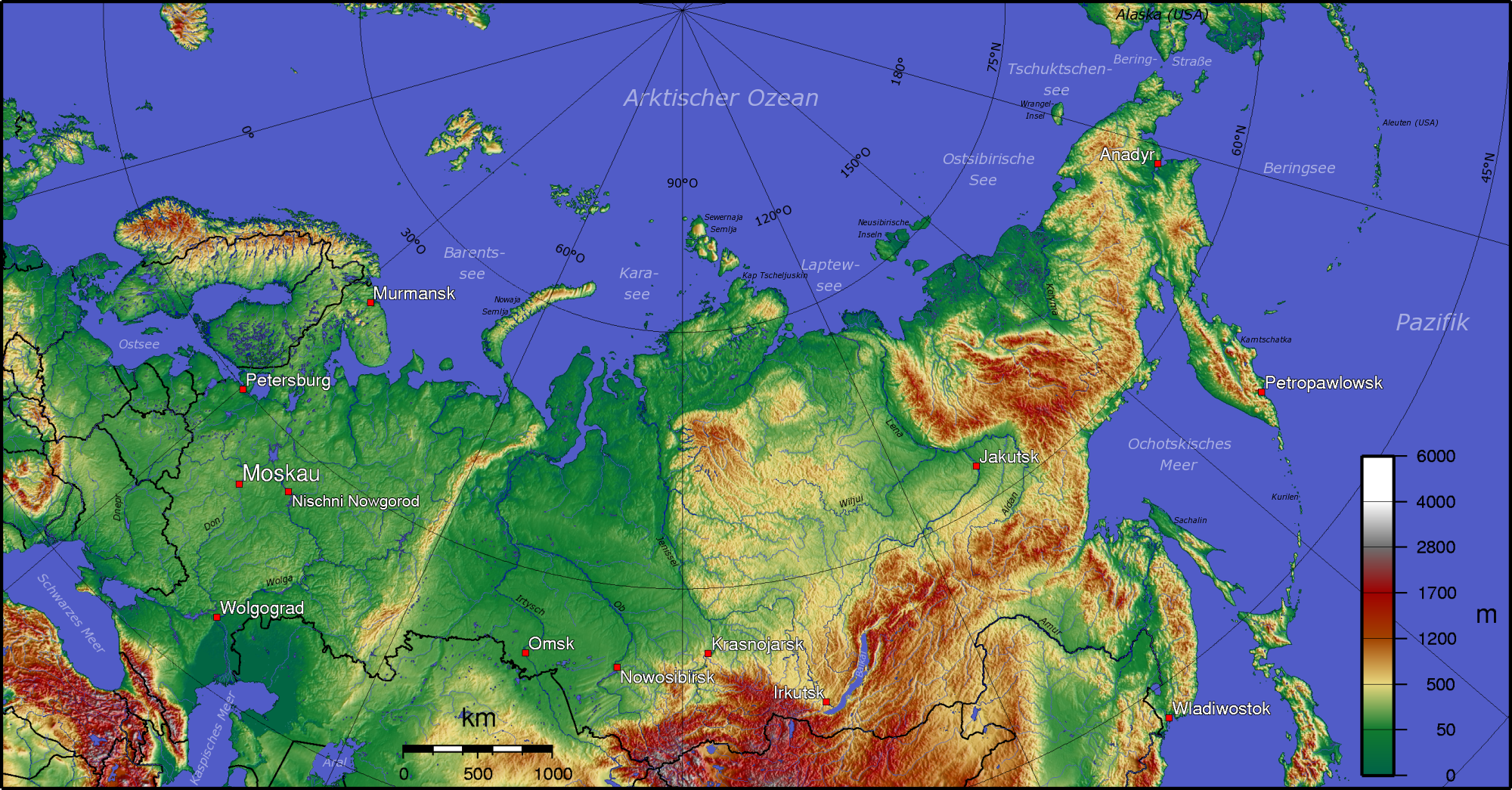
Topography of Russia

Siberia is characterised by a great deal of variety in climate, vegetation, and landscape. In the west, it is bordered by the Ural Mountains. From there, the west Siberian lowlands extend to the east, all the way to the river Yenisei. Beyond this are the central Siberian highlands which are bordered on the east by the basin of the Lena River, beyond that are the northeast Siberian highlands. Siberia is bordered on the south by a rough chain of mountains and to the southwest by the hills of the Kazakh border. The climate is very variable. Yakutia, northeast of the Lena, is among the coldest places on Earth, but every year temperatures may vary for more than 70°C, from as low as −50°C in winter to over +20°C in summer. The rainfall is very low. This is true of the southwest as well, where steppes, deserts and semi-deserts border on one another.

Agriculture is only possible in Siberia without artificial irrigation today between 50° and 60° north. The climatic situation is responsible for the different biomes of the region. In the northernmost section, there is tundra with minimal vegetation. The largest part of Siberia, aside from the mountainous regions, is taiga, northern coniferous forests. In the southwest this becomes forested steppe, and even further south it transitions to grass steppes and the central Asian desert. Before the beginning of the Holocene about 12,000 years ago, the situation was different. During the Weichselian glaciation (from before 115,000 years ago until 15,000 years ago), the tundra extended much further south and an ice sheet covered the Urals and the area to the east of the lower Yenisei.

== Historical overview ==
=== Paleolithic ===
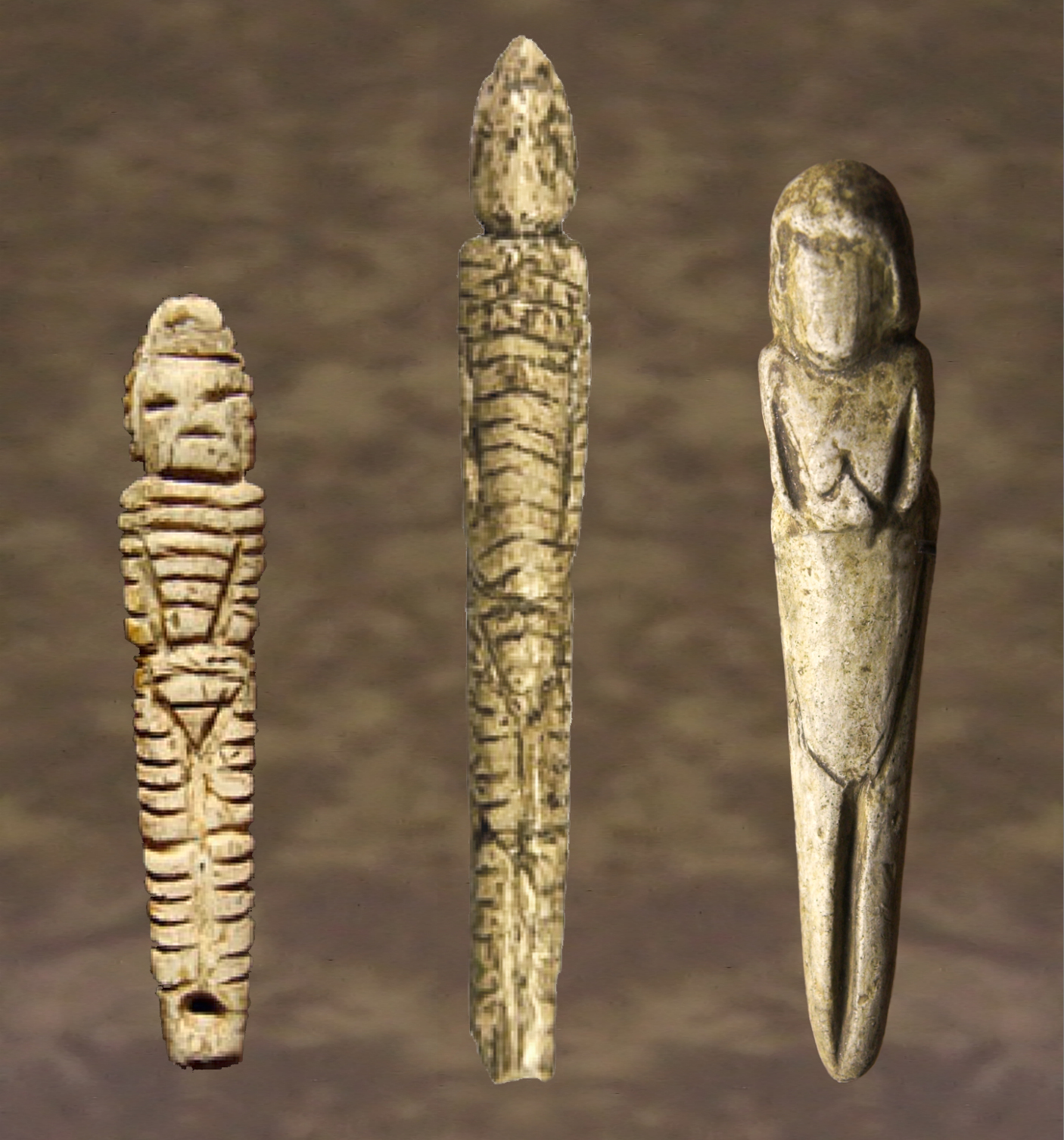
Mal'ta–Buret' culture ivory figurines (c. 24,000 BP-c. 15,000 BP). Some of the figurines wear hooded overalls with decorative stripes.

Late Paleolithic southern Siberians appear to be related to Paleolithic Europeans and the Paleolithic Jōmon people of Japan. Various scholars point out similarities between the Jōmon and Paleolithic and Bronze Age Siberians. A genetic analyses of HLA I and HLA II genes as well as HLA-A, HLA-B, and HLA-DRB1 gene frequencies links the Ainu people and some Indigenous peoples of the Americas, especially populations on the Pacific Northwest Coast such as Tlingit, to Paleolithic southern Siberians.

=== Mesolithic to Neolithic (until c. 2400 BC) ===
Finds from the Lower Paleolithic appear to be attested between east Kazakhstan and Altai. The burial of a Neanderthal child found in 1938 shows similarities with the Mousterian of Iraq and Iran. In the Upper Palaeolithic, by contrast, most remains are found in the Urals, where, among other things, rock carvings depicting mammoths are found, in Altai, on the upper Yenissei, west of Lake Baikal and around 25,000 on the shore of the Laptev Sea, north of the Arctic Circle. The remains of huts have been found in the settlement of Mal'ta near Irkutsk. Sculptures of animals and women (Venus figurines) recall the European Upper Palaeolithic. The Siberian Palaeolithic continues well into the European Mesolithic. In the postglacial period, the taiga developed. Microliths, which are common elsewhere, have not been found.

In North Asia, the Neolithic (c. 5500–3400 BC) is mostly a chronological term, since there is no evidence for agriculture or even pastoralism in Siberia during the central European Neolithic. However, the Neolithic cultures of North Asia are distinguished from the preceding Mesolithic cultures and far more visible as a result of the introduction of pottery.

Southwest Siberia reached a Neolithic cultural level during the Chalcolithic, which began here towards the end of the fourth millennium BC, which roughly coincided with the introduction of copper–working. In the northern and eastern regions, there is no detectable change.

=== Bronze Age (c. 2400–800 BC) ===
In the second half of the third millennium BC, bronzeworking reached the cultures of western Siberia. Chalcolithic groups in the eastern Ural foothills developed the so-called Andronovo culture, which took various local forms. The settlements of Arkaim, Olgino and Sintashta are particularly notable as the earliest evidence for urbanisation in Siberia. In the valleys of the Ob and Irtysh the same ceramic cultures attested there during the neolithic continue; the changes in the Baikal region and Yakutia were very slight.

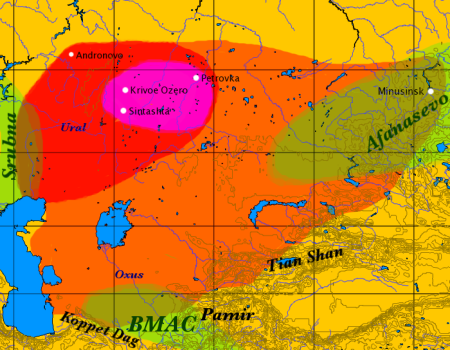
The extent of the Andronovo culture (red) during the Middle Bronze Age

In the middle Bronze Age (c. 1800–1500 BC), the west Siberian Andronovo culture expanded markedly to the east and even reached the Yenissei valley. In all the local forms of the Andronovo culture, homogenous ceramics are found, which also extended to the cultures on the Ob. Here, however, unique neolithic ceramic traditions were maintained as well.

With the beginning of the late Bronze Age (c. 1500–800 BC), crucial cultural developments took place in southern Siberia. The Andronovo culture dissolved; its southern successors produced an entirely new form of pottery, with bulbous ornamental elements. At the same time the southern cultures also developed new forms of bronze working, probably as a result of influence from the southeast. These changes were especially significant in the Baikal region. There, the Chalcolithic material culture which had continued up to this time was replaced by a bronze-working pastoralist culture. There and in Yakutia, bronze was only used as a material for the first time at this point.

The Ymyakhtakh culture (c. 2200–1300 BC) was a Late Neolithic culture of Siberia, with a very large archaeological horizon. Its origins seem to be in the Lena River basin of Yakutia, and also along the Yenisei River. From there it spread both to the east and to the west.

=== Iron Age (c. 800 BC - AD 500) ===
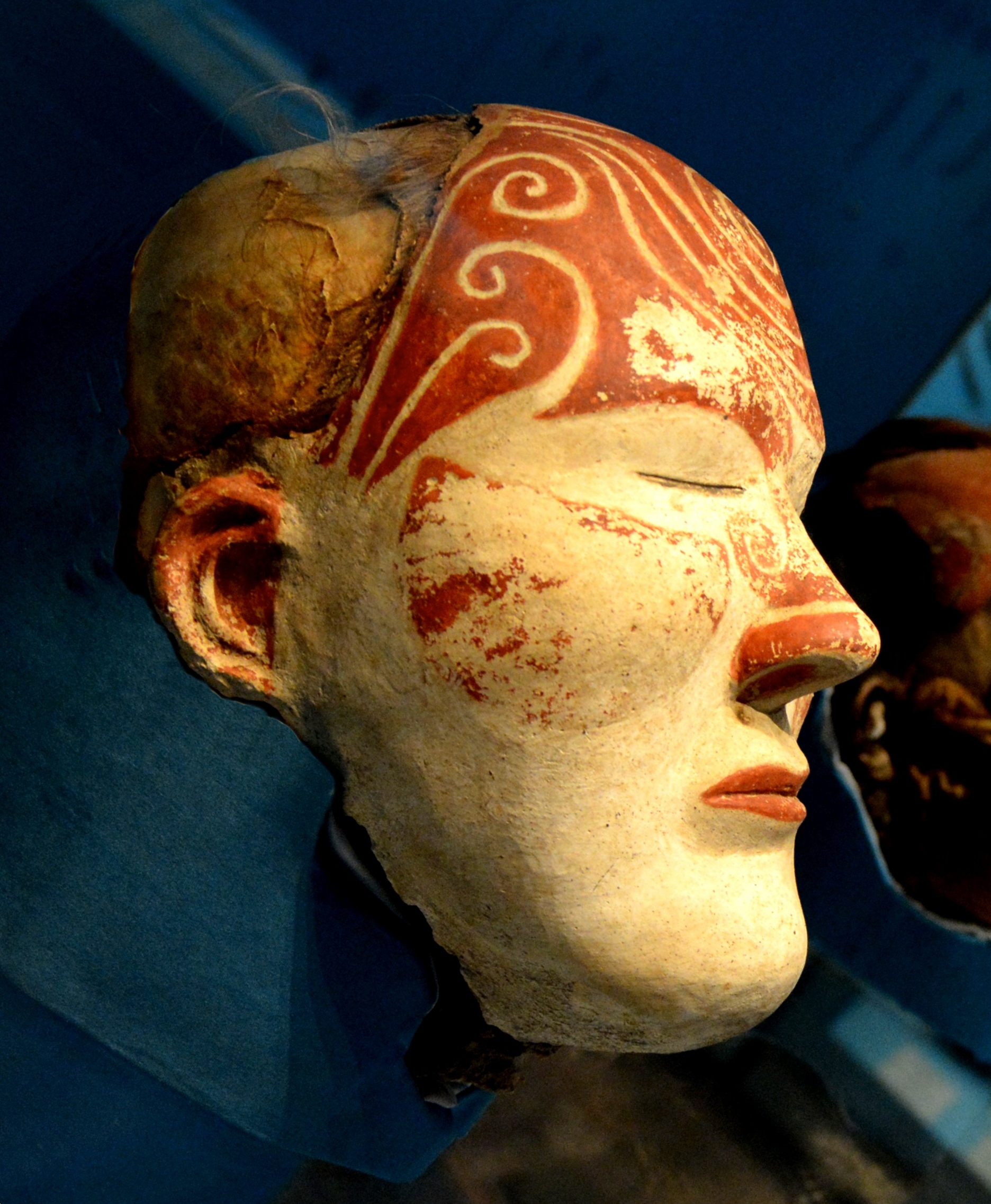
Tashtyk culture funeral mask

The cultural continuity on the Ob continued in the first millennium BC, as the Iron Age began in Siberia; the local ceramic style continues there even in this period. A much larger break occurred in the central Asian steppe: the sedentary, predominantly pastoralist society of the late Bronze Age is replaced by the mobile horse nomads who would continue to dominate this region until modern times. The mobility, which the new cultural form enabled, unleashed a powerful dynamic, since henceforth the people of Central Asia were able to move across the steppe in great numbers. The neighbouring sedentary cultures were not unaffected by this development. Ancient China was threatened by the Xiongnu and their neighbours, the ancient states of modern Iran were opposed by the Massagetae and Sakas, and the Roman Empire eventually was confronted by the Huns. The social changes are clearly indicated in the archaeological finds. Settlements are no longer found, members of the new elite were buried in richly furnished kurgans and completely new forms of art developed.

In the damper steppes to the north, the sedentary pastoralist culture of the late Bronze Age developed under the influence of the material culture of the nomads. Proto-urban settlements like Tshitsha from the late Irmen culture in west Siberia and the settlements in the north of the Xiongnu cultural area.

=== Subsequent period ===
In many places the transition to later periods remains problematic due to the lack of archaeological evidence. Nevertheless, some generalisations are possible. In the Central Asian steppes, Turkic groups become detectable sometime in the 5th century; over the following centuries, they expand to the north and west until eventually they brought the whole of southern Siberia under their control. The area further north, where the speakers of Uralic and Paleosiberian languages were located is still poorly known. The next clear break in the history of Siberia is the Russian expansion into the east which began in the 16th century and only concluded in the 19th century. This process marks the beginning of modernity in Siberia

== Peoples and languages ==
Reliable historical evidence for the area first appears at the beginning of the first millennium BC, with sources from the Near East. Greek and Chinese sources are also available from slightly later. Thus, certain statements about the peoples and languages of the region are only possible from the Iron Age. For earlier times and the northern part of Siberia, only archaeological evidence is available. Some theories, like the Kurgan hypothesis of Marija Gimbutas, attempt to relate hypothetical language families to archaeological cultures, but this is a highly uncertain procedure.

Sure statements are possible only since the first millennium BC, when neighbouring literate cultures came into contact with the people of the steppe. In the steppes north of the Black Sea and east of the Caspian Sea, Greek, Assyrian and Persian sources attest to horse nomads, which can be identified as speakers of Iranian languages. The first reports from ancient China of the nomads north of China date from the same period. Along with various unidentified groups from Shang and Zhou dynasty texts, the Xiongnu are worthy of mention. Based on personal names and titles transmitted by the Chinese sources, different scholars have attempted to identify the language of the Xiongnu as an early Turkic language, a proto-Mongolic language or a Yeniseian language. At the beginning of the early Middle Ages, the Iranian peoples disappeared and in their place Turkic peoples expanded across the region between the eastern edge of Europe and northeastern Siberia. In the areas to the north of the Asiatic steppes, speakers of Uralic and Palaeo-Siberian languages are suspected to have been settled; in the Middle Ages, Turkic peoples appear here as well, but their prehistoric extent is not clear.

== Cultures ==
=== Siberia before the Chalcolithic ===
The earliest known archaeological finds from Siberia date to the Lower Palaeolithic. In various places in West Siberia, the Baikal region and Yakutia, storage places from early Neolithic times have been found, which often remained in use for centuries. Alongside tent settlements which leave no traces in the ground, there were also huts, often dug slightly into the ground, whose walls and roofs were made of animal bone and reindeer antlers. Tools and weapons were mostly made from flint, slate and bone, with few discernable differences between them despite their immense chronological and geographical scope. In some settlements, early artworks have been found, which consist of human, animal and abstract sculptures and carvings. The Palaeolithic and Mesolithic inhabitants of Siberia were hunter-gatherers, whose prey consisted of mammoths and reindeer, and occasionally fish as well. In the 6th millennium BC, pottery spread across the whole of Siberia, which scholars treat as the beginning of the Siberian neolithic. Unlike Europe and the Near East, this event did not mark a major change in lifestyle, economy or culture.

=== Hunter-gatherers in Yakutia and the Baikal region ===
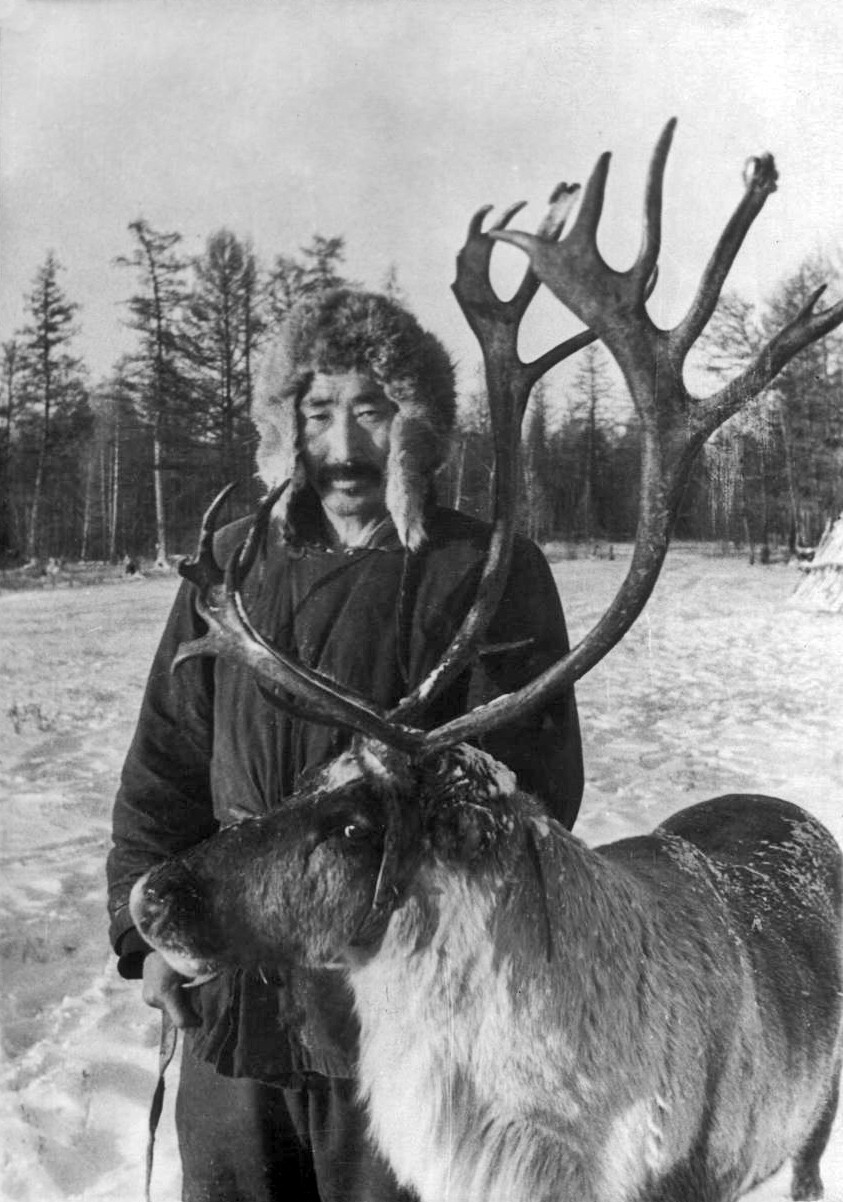
Reindeer herder in Yakutia (historical photo from around 1900)

The prehistoric inhabitants of the vast areas of taiga and tundra east of the Yenissei and north of Baikal differ in many ways from the prehistoric cultures of the other parts of north Asia. There is stronger evidence than usual for settlement continuity here from the Mesolithic until the second half of the first millennium AD, when the not yet entirely clear transition to the Medieval period occurred. Despite the enormous geographic extent of the area, only minor local differences are visible, indicating very mobile, nomadic inhabitants. The earliest culture in Yakutia to make ceramic was the Syalakh culture, which have been dated by radiocarbon dating to the 5th millennium BC. They are known from a type of pottery decorated with net patterns and bands of puncture marks. Their remains include weapons and tools made from flint and bone. A series of settlements, some of which were already in use in the Mesolithic, are known, at which the finds are limited to hearths and pits, while remains of buildings are entirely absent. Thus, the people responsible for the Syalakh culture were nomads who survived from hunting and fishing and inhabited certain spots on a seasonal basis.

This culture gradually transitions into the Belkachi culture (named after the Belkachi settlement in Yakutia) without any clear break. Their pottery features cord decorations, stripes, zigzag lines and such like. Their dead were buried on their backs in earthen graves. Otherwise, no major differences from the preceding culture are visible.

The Ymyyakhtakh culture (2200–1300 BC) is marked out by a new kind of "waffle ceramic", whose upper side is decorated with textile impressions and takes on a waffle-like appearance as a result. Towards the end of the 2nd millennium BC, bronzeworking reached Yakutia. Ymyyakhtakh settlements already feature bronze artifacts.

Ust-Mil culture followed next. In the first millennium BC, an independent culture developed on the Taymyr Peninsula, which shared its basic features with the Ust-Mil culture. The Iron Age began in Yakutia around the 5th century BC, but apart from the adoption of iron weapons and tools it does not mark a major change in the material culture.

The cultural development in Neolithic and Chalcolithic Baikal region, where the circumstances were similar to those in Yakutia until the appearance of the late Bronze Age Slab Grave culture. Here too there were some multi-layer storage places which extended back to the Mesolithic period, with hearths, waste pits and storage pits but no remains of buildings. The pottery was similar to that in Yakutia and shows a more or less parallel course of development. The burials are mostly stretched out on their backs, but often the graves were covered by stone slabs. An exception is the area of the Onon River, where crouching graves are found. Grave goods and bone finds indicate that the inhabitants lived by hunting bears, fish, elk and beavers, as well as some fish. The importance of the hunt to their culture is indicated by carvings on bones and rock faces. Their main subjects are people hunting animals. Unlike in Yakutia, pastoralism was adopted in the Baikal region before the Middle Ages; the earliest evidence comes from the Chalcolithic Glazkov culture.

=== Sedentary societies of West Siberia and the Baikal region ===
From the Neolithic or early in the Chalcolithic, sedentary groups in which pastoralism played an important economic role developed in southwestern Siberia. The transition to the new economic system and to sedentarism was very smooth. Subsequently, it spread to the Baikal region, where the influence of northern China may also have played a role.

==== Ceramics ====
Vessel of the early Bronze Age Igrekov culture (West Siberia, c. 2000 BC) with puncture rows

Vessel of the middle Bronze Age Andronovo culture (central Kazakhstan, c. 1600 BC) with meander bands and hatched triangles

Through the whole Siberian prehistoric period from the Neolithic until the Iron Age, there are a very limited range of ceramic types. The vast majority of ceramic finds are round bulbous vessels, often with folded edges. In the Neolithic they mostly had concave bases, while later flat bases became more common. In the eastern part of the west Siberian forest steppe, on the Ob, Irtysh and Yenissei, decoration consisted of comb patterns, puncture rows and dimples, arranged in long series or fields (right image). In the course of the dramatic growth of the Andronovo culture in the middle Bronze Age, another type spread through the region. Examples of it are decorated with meander bands, herringbone patterns and triangles (left image). These ceramic types endured even into the Iron Age in west Siberia, yet a stark decline in decoration is observable, contemporary with the entrance of the Scythian and Hunnic Sarmatian nomads. This applies even to the nomadic cultures themselves.

==== Art and small finds ====
Excepting the abstract decoration of the pottery, which has been dealt with above, artistic products are found in south Siberia only in the early Bronze Age.

Pottery fragment with anthropomorphic mask (Samus culture, early Bronze Age c. 2000 BC)

Artefacts from the Karakol culture in Altai and the Okunev culture in the middle Yenissei include anthropomorphic motifs on stone plates and steles; the Okunev culture also produced humanoid sculptures. The art of the Samus culture of the upper Ob is related to these. In addition to humanoid sculptures and human heads engraved in pottery, the Samus culture also produced ceramic phalli and animal heads. Members of the nearby Susgun culture produced humanoid figures in bone. The only artistic products of the late Bronze Age are early South Siberian deer stones, stone steles decorated with images of deer, which were subsequently imitated by Scythian art.

The early Iron Age animal style of the south Siberian horse nomads only influenced the cultures of the west Siberian lowlands a little. An entirely unique style was developed by the Kulaika culture and its neighbours in the middle and lower Ob. Here bronze figures of animals and people were manufactured, in which eagles and bears played a particularly important role.

==== Architecture ====
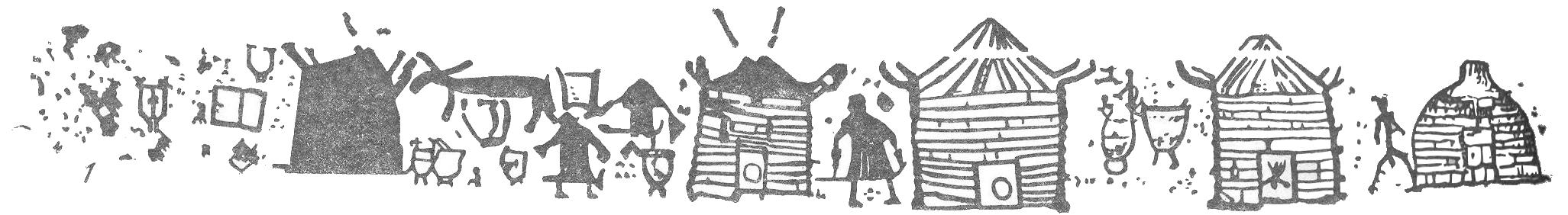
Rock face image of the Iron Age Tagar culture (Middle Yenissei, 9th–3rd century BC), depicting a settlement

The predominant building material in prehistoric north Asia was wood; stone was used for foundations at most. Most houses were tight structures, sunk less than 1 metre into the earth and had a rectangular or circular ground plan; oval or polygonal ground plans occur rarely. The structure of the roofs may have been pitched wooden constructions or saddle roofs. In many cultures, a small, corridor-like porch was built in front of the entrance. One or more hearths were found in the inner house.

City-like, fortified settlement of the Late Irmen culture (late Bronze Age, c. 1100 BC) in Tchitcha, west Siberia

Floodplains and lakesides were the preferred settlement locations. Settlements could take entirely different forms in different cultures; small groups of houses, large unfortified settlements, fortified city-like settlements and elevated fortress complexes are all found. Small village-like groups of houses are found in great numbers in all the sedentary cultures. In some cases, such as the chalcolithic settlement of Botai on the Ishim river, settlements experienced substantial expansion. It was not unusual for larger settlements to have walls and extramural graveyards, as in the case of the west Siberian settlements of Sintashta and Tshitsha. The inner space of these city-like settlements was densely and regularly packed with rectangular houses, indicating a form of town planning. The fortified settlements in elevated locations, like those located in the Minusinsk Hollow and Khakassia in the bronze and Iron Ages are usually distinguished from these settlements by their small size. Their purpose is still unclear; they may have been temporary refuges, the seats of elites, or sanctuaries.

==== Society ====
Unlike the nomadic groups of earlier times and of northeastern Siberia, complex social structures can be detected in sedentary groups in West Siberia in the early Bronze Age. Their existence is indicated by the city-like settlements and by the social differentiation indicated by differences in their grave goods. In the middle Bronze Age, this development seems to have reversed and social differentiation is only detectable again in the late Bronze Age and the Iron Age. Since the northern part of west Siberia was unknown to ancient literate cultures and the ancient inhabitants of this region have left no literary source material themselves, it is very difficult to make detailed statements about their society. In reference to the settled populations of the Wusun, who settled in the Tianshan and Zhetysu, Chinese sources indicate the existence of a king and several nobles.

==== Economy ====
The economy of the sedentary population in prehistoric Siberia was dominated by pastoralism. Cattle were intensively farmed in all cultures, as were sheep and goats. The raising of horses became very significant in western Siberia, particularly with the beginning of the Iron Age. A somewhat different image is given by the finds from the Xiongnu, who had also domesticated pigs and dogs. Hunting and fishing were initially an important supplement, but lost a lot of their significance over time.

Based on important tool remains and the possible remains of irrigation systems, a wide use of agriculture has been proposed by many researchers, but other scholars state that remains of cereals and other clear evidence are only found in the southernmost cultures, as remains of the Wusun of the Tianshan and Zhetysu. There, as in the northern parts of the Xiongnu territory, millet was cultivated and traces of wheat and rice have also been found. Millet seeds are also found in graves from Tuva, possibly indicating that a hitherto unknown population of settled agriculturalists, who might have been responsible for the area's metal-working, existed there alongside the horse nomads.

From the Chalcolithic, ore mining and metallurgy also occurred. This is shown by finds of slag, tools and workshops in various cultural contexts.

==== Religion and funerary practices ====
The burial customs of the sedentary societies were characterised by great variation. In the west Siberian chalcolithic, simple flat graves are found, in which the corpse is laid flat on its back. In the early Bronze Age, kurgans were erected for the first time, whose inhabitants were members of a newly developed warrior class (to judge from the grave goods interred with them) and were not buried in simple pits, but in wooden or stone structures. Already in the middle Bronze Age phase of the Andronovo culture, kurgans are found, but without differentiation of their grave goods. The corpse was interred in a crouched position or cremated. In the somewhat later Karasuk culture on the middle Yenissei, the tombs include rectangular stone enclosures, which were further developed into the stone-cornered kurgans characteristic of the area by the Tagar culture in the Iron Age. A special position belongs to the early Iron Age Slab Grave culture in the Transbaikal area; their dead were sometimes interred in stone cist graves. The burial of corpses lying on their backs which was practiced in west Siberia continued in the developing Scythian cultures of south Siberia, which is dealt with separately along with the other horse nomad cultures below.

Only isolated sanctuaries are known. Among them are the many burnt offering places found near the necropolis of the Chalcolithic Afanasevo culture in south Siberia. They consisted of simple stone circles containing ashes, pottery, animal bones and tools made of copper, stone and bone. The many circular buildings containing wooden stakes and walls, in the necropoleis near the early Bronze Age settlement of Sintashta, are probably cult buildings.

=== Iron Age steppe people of central and eastern Asia ===
The horse nomads who were characteristic of the Asiatic steppe until modern times are a relatively recent phenomenon. Even in the late second millennium BC, settled pastoralists lived in the arid regions of Central Asia. They were replaced by the early horse nomads in the course of the first millennium BC in ways which are not entirely clear.

The transition to the sedentary groups further north was fluid in many places. The inhabitants of the Minusinsk hollow remained settled pastoralists even in the Iron Age, but their cultural development shows strong affinities to the neighbouring nomads. The Xiongnu in Transbaikal region show characteristics of both horse nomads and settled pastoralists and farmers. The situation in northern Tianshan and Zhetysu is remarkable: in the early Iron Age the nomadic Sakas lived there, but the region was subsequently taken over by the sedentary Wusun.

The earlier nomadic cultures are referred to collectively by archaeologists using the term "Scythian", which is the ancient Greek term for a group of horse nomads living north of the Black Sea; in a wider sense it referred to all horse nomads in the Eurasian steppe. The third century AD marks the beginning of the Hunnic-Sarmatian period, named after two nomadic groups from southern Russia, which continued until the establishment of the Khaganate of the Gokturks in the sixth century AD.

==== Art ====
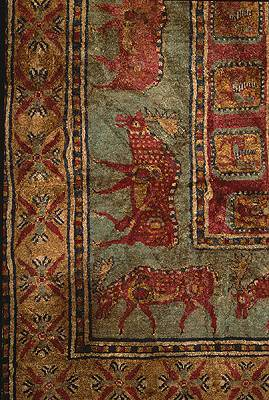
Carpet with elk in a line (Pazyryk rug)

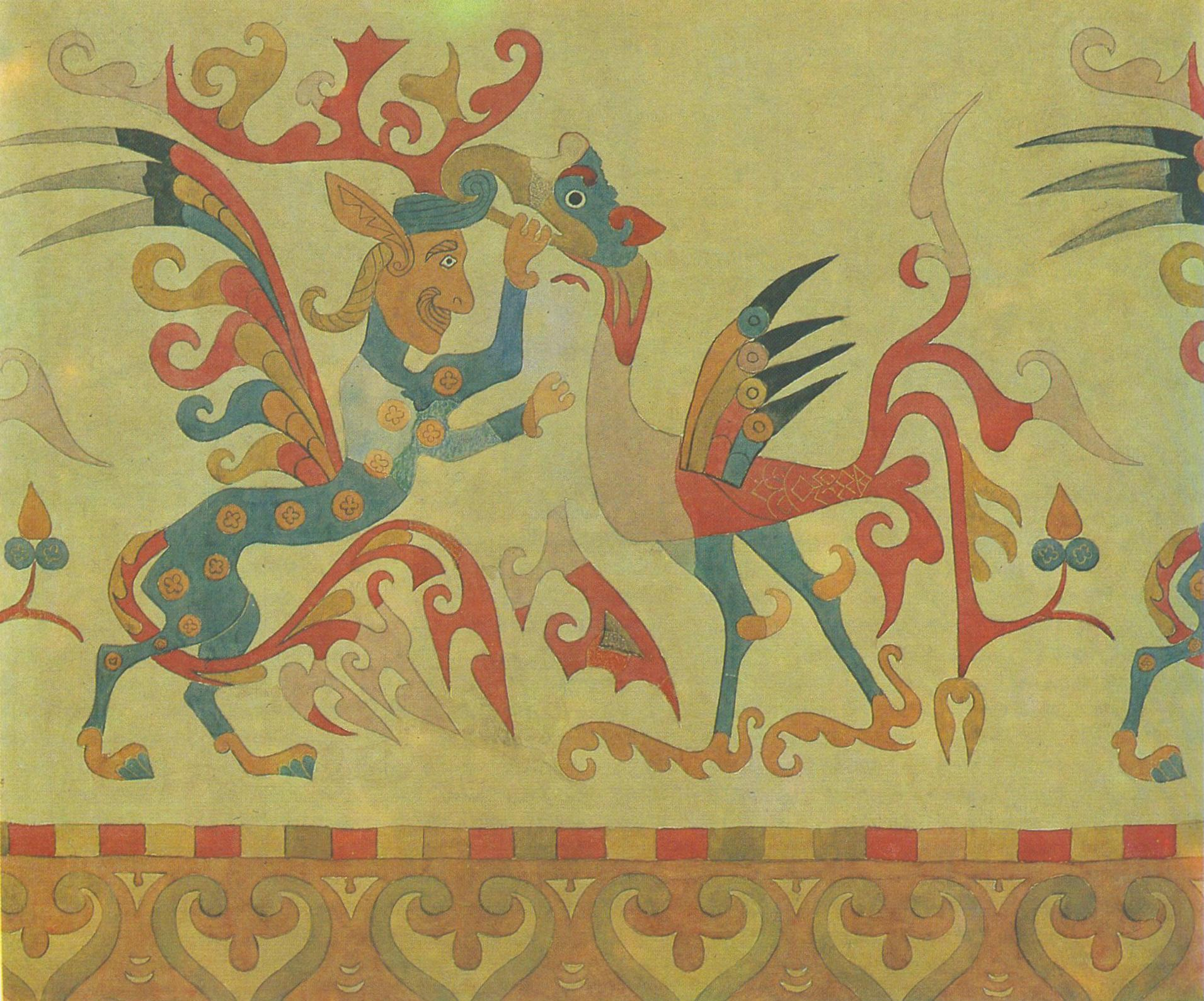
Felt carpet depicting a battle between a hybrid being and a griffin (Pazyryk)

While the art of the settled cultures of the Asiatic steppe in the Bronze Age was dominated by anthropomorphic motifs, the advent of the horse nomads was accompanied by the development of the Scytho-Sarmatian animal style, which all the steppe people of Asia and eastern Europe shared. Its basic motifs were taken from a repertoire of wild animals, with a remarkable absence of animals which were significant to the daily life of the horse nomads. Thus depictions of horses and of people are extremely rare. Instead, the common motifs are deer, mostly lying down, elk, big cats (which must indicate Near Eastern influence), griffins and hybrids. Individual animals sometimes appear rolled up together as a "rolled animal", pairs of different animal species may be interlaced in a purely ornamental way, or depicted fighting one another. A line of the members of the same species often appear in borders, while individual parts of animals, like their heads, often serve as ornaments.

Especially in the western steppes metal wares are found almost exclusively decorated with elements of the animal style; in the permafrost of south Siberia and Transbaikal, felt carpets and other textiles with elements from the animal style are also found, among which a felt swan stuffed with moss deserves special attention. Stone was only used a little, mostly in the so-called "deer stele," probably anthropomorphic grave stele, which were decorated with deer and are found in south Siberia, Transbaikalia and Mongolia. Finally, the bodies of important people were tattooed with motifs from the animal style.

The origins of the animal style are unclear. Based on possible interactions with ancient eastern art, a strong influence from the south has been proposed. The early dating of some pieces from southern Siberia however, makes a local development on the steppes themselves more likely. It is certain however that especially in central Asia and the area north of the Black Sea, Greek and Persian art had a great influence on the art of the steppe peoples.

==== Society ====
Known features, which were shared by the societies of the horse nomad cultures of the Bronze Age, include a powerful warrior elite, whose wealth and strength is clear from their elaborate grave goods. Particularly interesting in this context are the Chinese reports which provide detailed descriptions of the society of the Xiongnu. According to them, the population was divided into clan-like groups, which gathered together in large clan alliances. Their leaders stood in a strict hierarchy and were all under the authority of the Chanyu, the commander of the entire Xiongnu confederacy.

==== Economy ====
The horse nomads of Inner Asia were nomadic pastoralists and probably travelled about in rather small groups. They particularly focussed on sheep, goats and horses, and in some regions other animals, such as the camel. Agriculture was undertaken by parallel settled populations, but probably did not play an important role. Ore mining and metal working which are known for some nomadic cultures, was probably undertaken by very elusive settled groups as well.

==== Religion and funerary practices ====
All horse nomad cultures shared the burial of the dead in barrow graves which are known as kurgans. Their size is very variable, with a radius of between 2 and 50 metres and a height of less than one or more than 18 metres, evidently reflecting differences in social hierarchy.

Kurgan of Pazyryk in Altai. In the centre is a shaft and detritus left by tomb robbers.

In some regions, kurgans are surrounded by various kinds of stone enclosure. The more or less rectangular tombs of the later Tagar culture were sometimes surrounded by a row of stones at the edge of the kurgan mound, which was broken up by higher stones at regular intervals - later these were usually just at the corners. In the Iron Age culture of Tuva, some but not all kurgans were surrounded by a rectangular or round stone wall. The kurgans themselves were partially built of earth and partially of stone, with regional variation.

In the ground beneath the kurgan was buried one or (very often) more tombs. The corpse lay either in a wooden chamber or a stone cist. The grave goods found along with them indicate that wooden chambers were reserved for people of higher status. While in burials from the Bronze Age the corpses were usually in a crouching position, in the Iron Age they were usually laid on their backs. Evidence for the handling of the dead are only known from Altai and Tuva, were some bodies are preserved as ice mummies by the permafrost, making detailed analysis possible. In these locations, the guts and muscles were removed before burial and the resulting holes were stitched closed with tendons and horse hair. It is uncertain whether damage to the skull reflects injuries that occurred before death or were made after death. Ritual trepanation cannot be assumed. After the guts were removed, distinguished corpses were tattooed and embalmed. These traditions are described also by the Greek historian Herodotus, who included material on the Scythians north of the Black Sea in his 5th century BC work, and is the main Greek source on the Scythians. Even his report of cannabis inhalation in small groups during the funeral have been corroborated by finds from the Pazyryk burials. This corroboration not only affirms the accuracy of Herodotus, but also indicates the cultural homogeneity of the steppe peoples of west Siberia, Central Asia and the region north of the Black Sea. The great kurgans of the Xiongnu present a rather different picture, however. There the burial chambers are deeper and were accessed by a ramp.

Along with the corpse, the burial chambers also contained grave goods, whose richness could vary dramatically. Ordinary mounted warriors were buried with a fully equipped horse and weapons, women were buried with a horse, a knife and a mirror. The burials of higher ranking people were much richer. These could include up to twentyfive richly outfitted horses and an elaborate chariot; the actual burial chamber was built from wooden planks (often larch). The corpse, with a woman who probably accompanied him in death, lay, clothed, in a long treetrunk coffin. In Noil Ula in Mongolia, a woman's braids were interred instead of the woman herself. Outstanding examples of kurgans include the necropoleis of Pazyryk in Altai, Noin Ula in Mongolia, and Arzhan in Tuva, where organic matter was preserved by the permafrost. Thus, felt carpets which decorated the inner walls of the burial chamber, decorated saddles and various kinds of clothing were also found. Although many large kurgans have been robbed of their contents by grave robbers, exceptional examples still remain, including countless gold objects.

On account of the general absence of written source material, research on the religion of the steppe people is based on parallels with later peoples and on the archaeological finds themselves. The funerary rituals leave no doubt about the belief in an afterlife, in which the dead had need of the same material items which they had in life – hence their burial with them.

== General References ==
- Chester S. Chard: Northeast Asia in Prehistory. The University of Wisconsin Press, Madison 1974. ISBN 0-299-06430-1 (Short overview)
- Michail Grjasnow: Südsibirien. Archaeologia Mundi. Nagel, Genf 1970 (From the Copper Age)
- Karl Jettmar: Die frühen Steppenvölker. Der eurasiatische Tierstil. Entstehung und sozialer Hintergrund. Holle, Baden-Baden 1964
- Владимир Иванович Матющенко: Древняя история Сибири Omsk 1999 ISBN 5-7779-0135-2 (Wladimir Iwanowitsch Matjuschtschenko: Drewnjaja istorija Sibiri.) (Russian general overview)
- М. Г. Мошкова (Ed.): Степная полоса азиатской части СССР в скифо-сарматское время. Moskau 1992. ISBN 5-02-009916-3 (Discusses the steppe people of South Siberia and Mongolia)
- Hermann Parzinger: Die frühen Völker Eurasiens. Vom Neolithikum bis zum Mittelalter. Historische Bibliothek der Gerda-Henkel-Stiftung, Band 1 Beck, München 2006 ISBN 978-3-406-54961-8 (Detailed overview)
- S. I. Rudenko: Die Kultur der Hsiung-nu und die Hügelgräber von Noin Ula. Antiquitas, Reihe 3, Band 7. Rudolf Habelt, Bonn 1969
