= Port au Choix =

Port au Choix Portutxoa
- Town
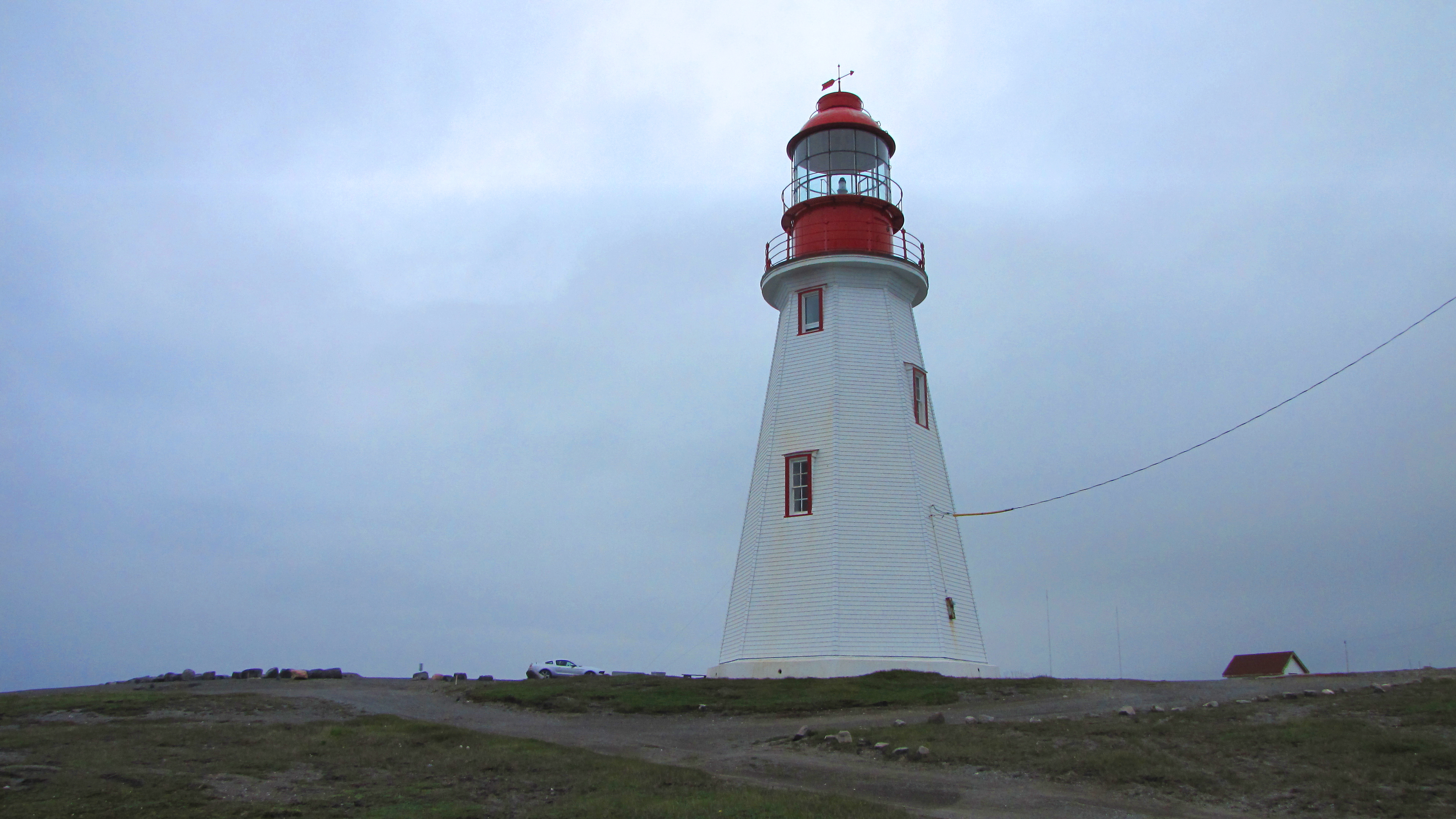
- Port aux Choix lighthouse

- Seal

- Location of Port aux Choix in Newfoundland
- Coordinates: 50°42′11″N 57°21′08″W
- Country: Canada
- Province: Newfoundland and Labrador

Government
  - Type: Municipal

Population (2021)
  - Total: 742
- Time zone: UTC-3:30 (Newfoundland Time)
  - Summer (DST): UTC-2:30 (Newfoundland Daylight)
- Postal code: A0K 4C0
- Area code: 709
- Website: http://www.pc.gc.ca/lhn-nhs/nl/portauchoix/index.aspx

Port au Choix or Port aux Choix (/ˈpɔːrtətʃwɑː/; from French: [pɔʁoʃwa] misanalyzed to mean 'choice port', from Basque: Portutxoa Basque pronunciation: [poɾtutʃoa], meaning 'little port') is a town in the Canadian province of Newfoundland and Labrador.

== Demographics ==
In the 2021 Census of Population conducted by Statistics Canada, Port au Choix had a population of 742 living in 360 of its 395 total private dwellings, a change of −6% from its 2016 population of 789. With a land area of 35.56 km^{2} (13.73 sq mi), it had a population density of 20.9/km^{2} (54.0/sq mi) in 2021.

== National Historic Site ==
Port au Choix is a National Historic Site of Canada, and the community is regarded as one of the richest archeological finds in North America. Burial sites uncovered in the town in the 1960s & 70s provide evidence of its earliest settlers - from the Maritime Archaic Indians to the Groswater and Dorset Palaeo-Eskimos to the Recent Indians (ancestors of the Beothuks). While prehistoric coastlines elsewhere have long since slipped beneath the encroaching ocean, the raised shoreline and alkaline soil conditions at Port au Choix have combined to preserve a time capsule of great historical importance.

Because of the cultural significance of this burial site, and a successful local lobby, the site was officially designated a National Historic Site in 1970. In 2001, Parks Canada constructed a new Visitor Centre and Museum dedicated to the rich history of the native peoples - the first ever to inhabit Newfoundland, dating back over 5000 years.

=== Basque chaloupe ===
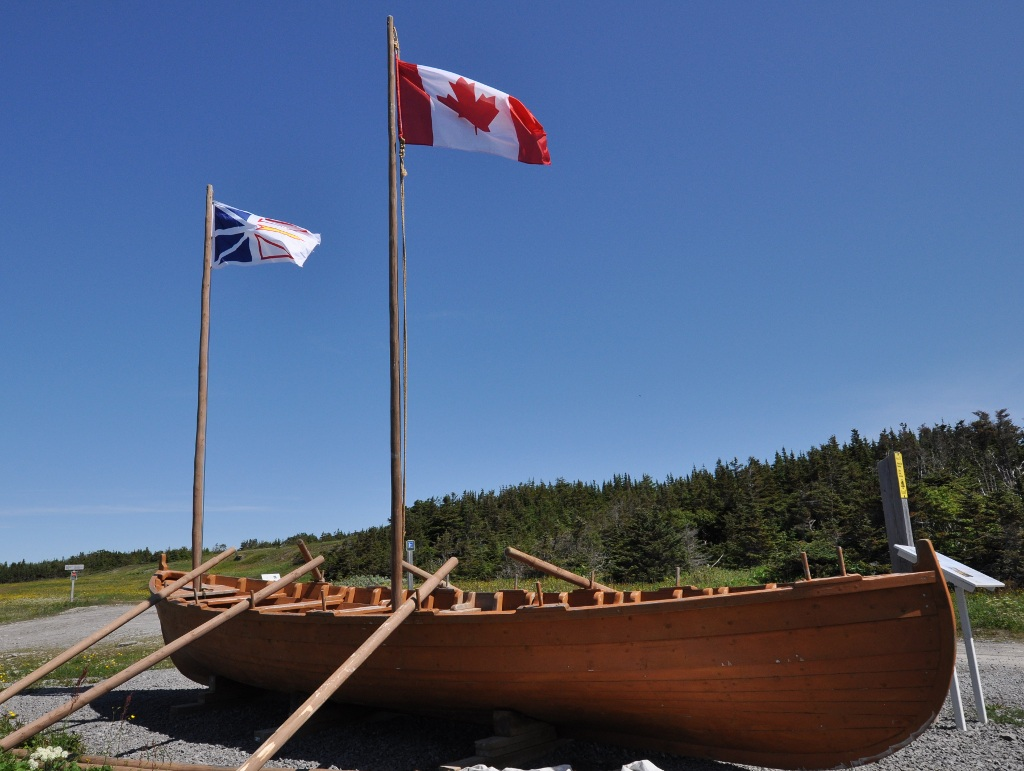
The chaloupe at Port au Choix

In 2004, through the effort of the 2004 Society, an association of Basque Maritime Heritage, Itsas Begia (The eye of the sea) from Ciboure (Northern Basque Country), came to Newfoundland and shared its ancestral knowledge with Newfoundlanders. Three chaloupes were built, here in Port au Choix, in Conche and in La Scie. The chaloupe is located on Forest Road, in the old Port au Choix cove.
