= Early Paleo-Eskimo =

Early pre-Inuit culture in arctic Russia, Canada and Alaska

The Early Paleo-Eskimo is the first of three distinct periods of human occupation recognized by archaeologists in the eastern North American Arctic, the others being the Late Paleo-Eskimo and the Thule. Dates for these occupations vary according to specific geographic region and cultural historical perspective, but it is generally agreed that the Early Paleo-Eskimo approximately spans the period from 4500 BP to 2800-2300 BP.

== The Early Paleo-Eskimo tradition ==
The Early Paleo-Eskimo tradition is known by a number of local, and sometimes spatially and temporally overlapping and related variants including the Independence I culture in the High Arctic and Greenland, Saqqaq culture in Greenland, Pre-Dorset in the High and Central Arctic and the Baffin/Ungava region and Groswater in Newfoundland and Labrador. More generally these are subsumed under a larger microlith tradition known as the Arctic Small Tool Tradition. Their ancestral origins are presumed to lie in Alaska, and ultimately Siberia and Eurasia.

== Sources ==
- Murray, M.S. (2005). Prehistoric Use of Ringed Seals: A Zooarchaeological Study from Arctic Canada. Environmental Archaeology 10 (1): 19–38.
