= Groswater Bay =

- Kangerliorsoak (Innu)
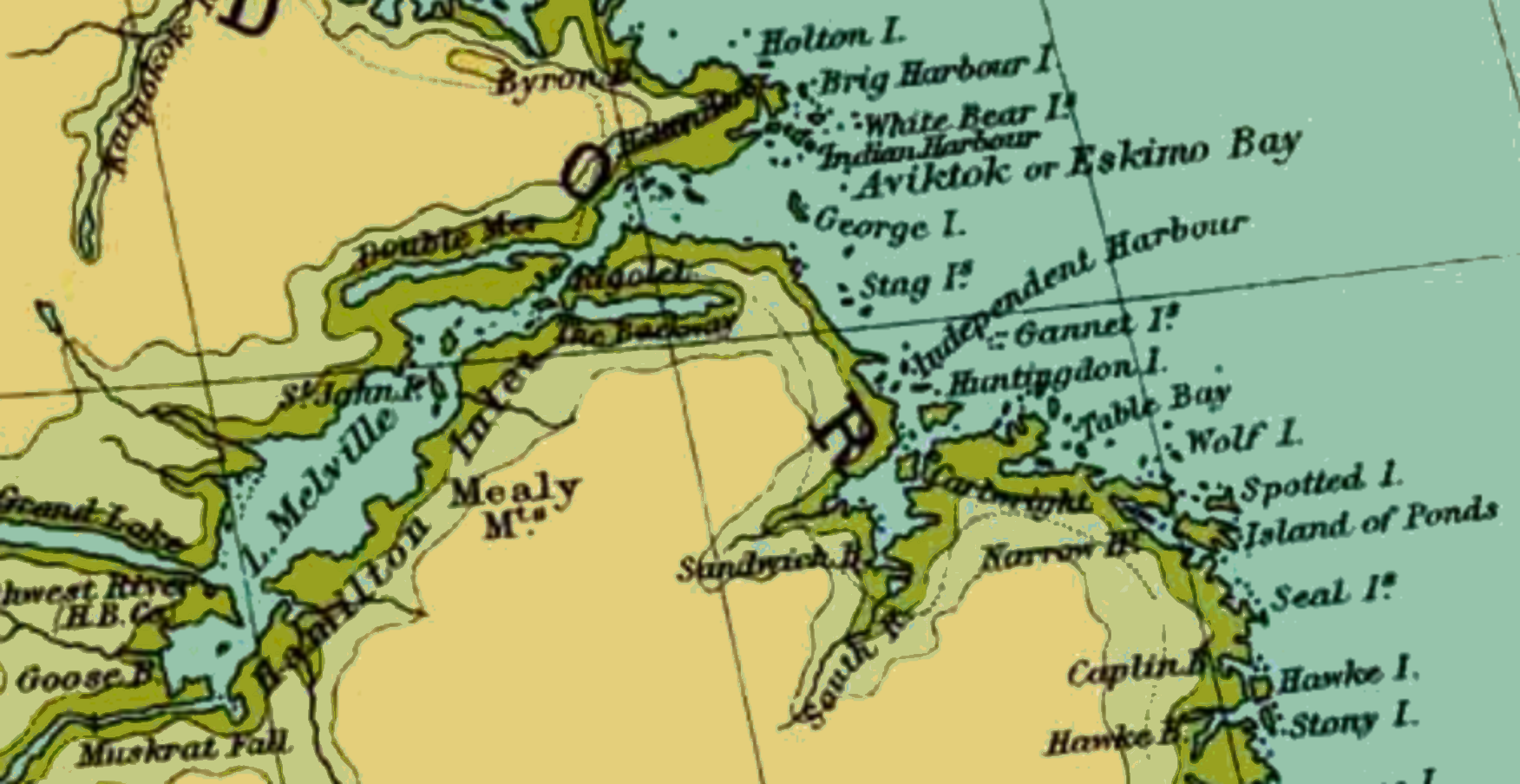
- A map of the Lake Melville/Hamilton Inlet/Groswater Bay system, showing Hamilton Inlet as inclusive of L. Melville and Groswater Bay as "Eskimo Bay"

- Location in Labrador
- Location: South central Labrador, at the entrance of Hamilton Inlet
- Coordinates: 54°20′00″N 57°39′57″W
- Basin countries: Canada

Groswater Bay (Inuttitut: Kangerliorsoak), also known by other names, is a bay in south central Labrador, Canada. Its Hamilton Inlet and Melville Lake extensions stretch 140 km (87 mi) inland.

== Names ==
Groswater Bay's name is a compound formed from French gros ("fat; thick; coarse, rough") and English water, reflecting the long history of using the area for fishing. It has also been known as Ivucktoke or Aviktok (Inuttitut: Aivitok); Eskimo or Esquimaux Bay (French: Baie des Esquimaux, "Bay of the Eskimos"); and St Louis Bay (French: Baie-St Louis). These names are also sometimes extended to Hamilton Inlet and even Lake Melville.

== Fauna ==
Many birds nest here, including common eiders.

== Legacy ==
The Groswater culture of Paleo-Eskimos is named after Groswater Bay.
