= Henrietta Island (Canada) =

Island in Newfoundland and Labrador, Canada

Coordinates: 54.087°N 58.470°W

Henrietta Island is an island located in the narrows of Hamilton Inlet in Labrador, Canada. It is south of the Inuit town of Rigolet.
