= Arctic Small Tool tradition =

Prehistoric culture

The Arctic Small Tool tradition (ASTt) was a broad cultural entity that developed along the Alaska Peninsula, around Bristol Bay, and on the eastern shores of the Bering Strait around 2500 BC. ASTt groups were the first human occupants of Arctic Canada and Greenland. This was a terrestrial entity that had a highly distinctive toolkit based on microblade technology. Typically tool types include scrapers, burins and side and end blades used in composite arrows or spears made of other materials, such as bone or antler. Many researchers also assume that it was Arctic Small Tool populations who first introduced the bow and arrow to the Arctic, that eventually became the Eskimo archery material culture. ASTt camps are often found along coasts and streams, to take advantage of seal or salmon populations. While some of the groups were fairly nomadic, more permanent, sod-roofed homes have also been identified from Arctic Small Tool tradition sites.

The concept of the Arctic Small Tool tradition was first employed by William Irving as a culture group including a number of smaller, diversified cultures including the Denbigh Flint Complex in Alaska, the Pre-Dorset culture in Arctic Canada, Independence I culture in the High Arctic and Saqqaq culture in southern Greenland. The ASTt was followed by the Norton tradition in Alaska and the Dorset culture in Arctic Canada.

== Siberian connections ==
According to Pavel Flegontov, the ASTt may have originated in East Siberia about 5,000 years ago, a view supported by an ancient DNA study:

"Paleo-Eskimo archeological cultures are grouped under the Arctic Small Tool tradition (ASTt), and include the Denbigh, Choris, Norton, and Ipiutak cultures in Alaska, and the Saqqaq, Independence, Pre-Dorset, and Dorset cultures in the Canadian Arctic and Greenland. The ASTt source has been argued to lie in the Syalakh-Bel’kachi-Ymyakhtakh culture sequence of East Siberia, dated to 6,500 – 2,800 calBP."

The earliest form of the Norton tradition of Alaska is known as the Choris Stage (ca. 1600—500 BC). The sites are mostly coastal and contain pottery similar to that of Siberia. This culture expanded as far as the Mackenzie River Delta and Banks Island.
