= William Irving (archaeologist) =

Canadian archaeologist

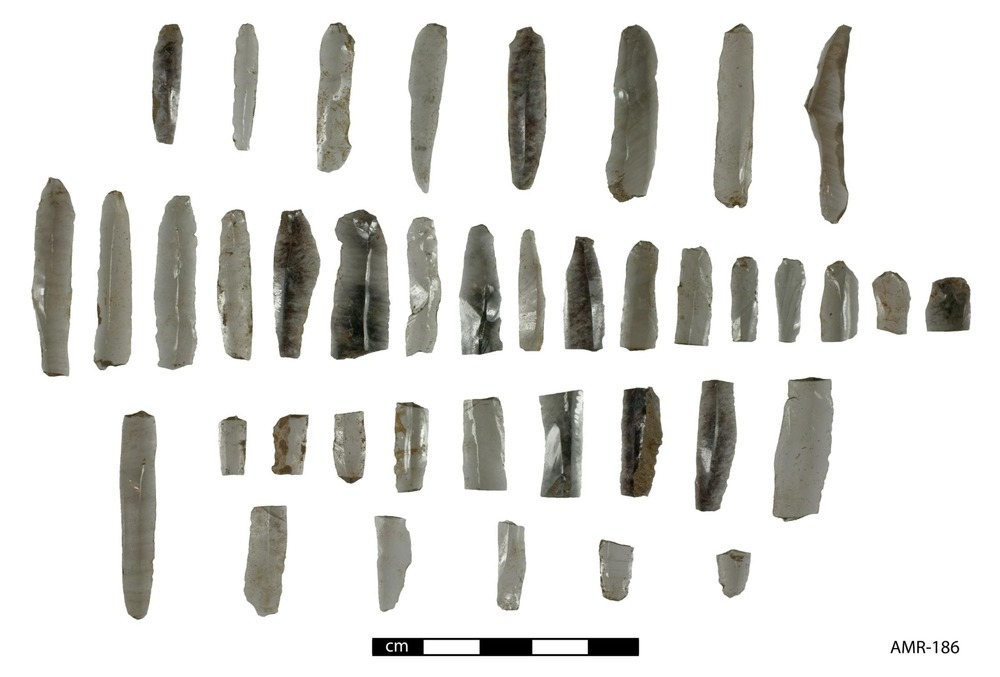
Denbigh obsidian microblades, part of the Arctic Small Tool tradition

William Irving (November 11, 1927 – November 25, 1987) was a Canadian archaeologist and scholar of the prehistory of the North American Arctic. He was internationally recognized as a leading scholar of the historical Inuit cultures of north Alaska. Irving was born in Toronto, Canada. He received a Ph.D. in anthropology from the University of Wisconsin at Madison in 1964. His scholarly work includes a study of the early peopling of the Americas, where he was the first to use the term Arctic Small Tool tradition.
