= Arctic Anthropology =

- Discipline: Anthropology
- Language: English
- Edited by: Christyann M. Darwent

Publication details
- History: 1962–present
- Publisher: University of Wisconsin Press (United States)
- Frequency: Biannually
- Impact factor: 0.212 (2012)

Standard abbreviations
- ISO 4: Arct. Anthropol.

Indexing
- CODEN: ARANBP
- ISSN: 0066-6939 (print); 1933-8139 (web)
- LCCN: sf78000711
- JSTOR: 00666939
- OCLC no.: 8690771

Links
- Journal homepage; Online access

Arctic Anthropology is a peer-reviewed academic journal covering research on the archaeology, ethnology, and physical anthropology of arctic and subarctic peoples. It is indexed in the Social Sciences Citation Index and Current Contents/Social & Behavioral Sciences. According to the Journal Citation Reports, the journal has a 2019 impact factor of 0.188.

The journal was established in 1962 by Chester S. Chard and its current editor-in-chief is Christyann M. Darwent (University of California, Davis). It is published biannually in summer and winter.
