= Groswater culture =

Archaeological culture of Canada

- A map of sites found from the Groswater Proto-Inuit culture across Newfoundland and Labrador.
- Geographical range: Newfoundland and Labrador
- Dates: c. 800 BC – 50 CE
- Type site: Groswater Bay
- Major sites: Phillip's Garden East/West
- Preceded by: Maritime Archaic
- Followed by: Dorset culture

The Groswater culture was a Paleo-Eskimo culture that existed in Newfoundland and Labrador, as well as Quebec from 800 BC to about 50 CE. The culture was of Arctic origin and migrated south after the decline of the Maritime Archaic people following the 900 BC Iron Age Cold Epoch. It is believed to have been replaced by or developed into the Dorset culture around 2000 BP. It is named after Groswater Bay, a bay in central Labrador.

== Archaeological Evidence ==
Remains of animals found in Groswater sites imply a reliance on sea mammals, especially the harp seal. Sea birds, small game, and caribou were also hunted. Sites were situated on headlands and their tools were focused on hunting sea mammals. They demonstrate fine craftsmanship with stone tools, creating lithic and bone tools that were small and finely chipped. They used tools made from finely cut chert, a rock used by the Paleo-Eskimo peoples of the North Atlantic.

It is unclear why the Groswater Culture declined, although historians have hypothesized changes in climate and availability of marine animals as well as gradual replacement by the Dorset culture, or assimilation by or development into said culture. The major site at Philip's Garden in Port au Choix was abandoned by about the year 50 CE, in the end days of the Groswater Culture.

== Tool Construction ==
They demonstrate fine craftsmanship with stone tools, creating lithic and bone tools that were small and finely chipped or ground. They used tools made from finely cut chert, a rock used by the Paleo-Eskimo peoples of the North Atlantic. Many of these tools are sourced from a chert outcrop in Cow Head, Newfoundland.

The characteristic, or typical, Groswater tool assemblage is defined by: box-based, side-notched, plano-convex harpoon endblades; circular and ovate sideblades; rectangular and triangular endscrapers, some of which are eared; chipped and ground burin-like tools; concave sidescrapers; large, side-notched bifaces; microblades; long, narrow, quartzite abraders; and chipped and ground axes and adzes

— Dominique Lavers and M.A.P. Renouf, A Groswater Palaeoeskimo Component at the Dorset Palaeoeskimo Phillip's Garden Site, Port au Choix, Northwestern Newfoundland, page 314

== Subsistence ==
As most Groswater lived coastally, they mostly hunted marine mammals and other marine animals. Much of the evidence for their subsistence is related to seal hunting, specifically harp seals and harbour seals. They also hunted caribou seasonally. Their coastal dwellings also meant they could have subsisted on other marine animals, such as sea birds, shellfish, and fish. Seasonal food availability likely influenced where the Groswater moved to. They were very mobile, and they strategically focused on seasonal resources for subsistence.

== See also ==
- Early Paleo-Eskimo
- Thule
- Arctic Small Tool Tradition
