= Chertov Ovrag =

Archeological site on Wrangel Island, Chukotka, Russia

Coordinates: 71°N 179.883°E

Location within Chukotka Autonomous Okrug, Russia

Chertov Ovrag is an archaeological site on Wrangel Island, Russian Arctic.

In 1975, evidence was found at this site of human occupation. This is the westernmost site of Paleo-Eskimo habitation. No decisive evidence was found that the people hunted large land animals, but there was evidence that they were hunting sea mammals.

Various stone and ivory tools were found, including a toggle harpoon, used for hunting sea mammals. The emergence of hunting sea mammals was a significant innovation for the Arctic culture, believed to have started from 2000 to 1 BCE. The Chertov Ovrag site contributed to the understanding of the development of Arctic culture.
