= Chester S. Chard =

American anthropologist

Chester S. Chard (1915–2002) was an American anthropologist who collaborated with Russian and Japanese scholars to establish the field of circumpolar or arctic anthropology. He received degrees at Harvard University (1937) and the University of California at Berkeley (Ph.D. 1952 in Anthropology) where he was one of Robert Lowie's last graduate students. He taught for over 20 years, mostly at the University of Wisconsin–Madison, and published over 160 books and articles. His research focused on Old World prehistory, cultural history of North and East Asia, and the interhemispherical relationships of New World cultures and circumpolar problems. He founded the academic journal Arctic Anthropology, in 1962. He published on numerous topics and cultures, including the ball courts of the Southwest, Pre-Columbian trade, the Kamchadal culture, North American burial grounds, the prehistory of Siberia, Inner Asia, prehistoric Japan, the Nganasan people, Eskimos, and the Chukchi Peninsula.
