= Samus culture =

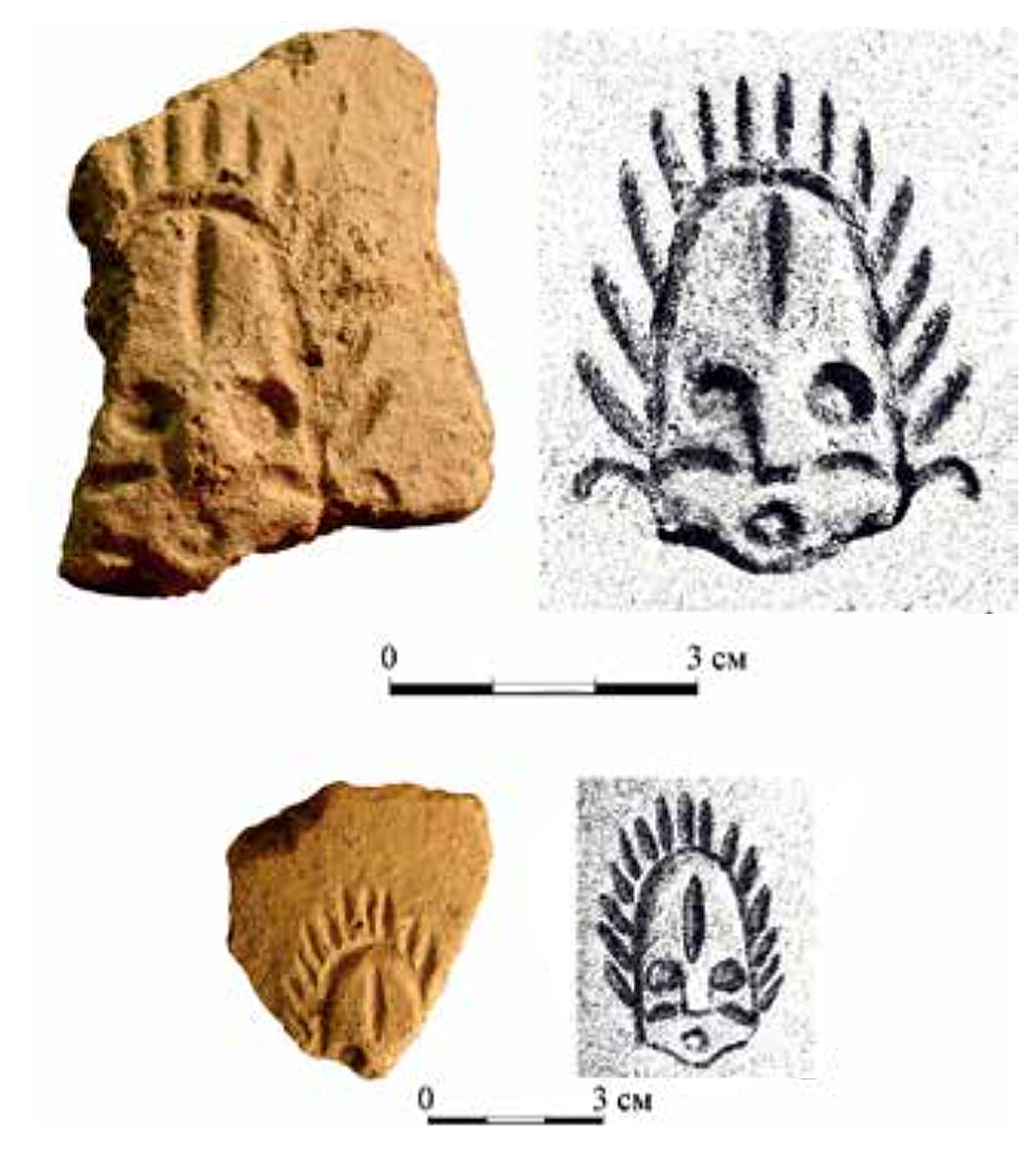
- Alternative names: Samus'skaya kul'tura, Samus’, Samus'sky
- Geographical range: Ob Irtysh forest-steppe of Southern Western Siberia
- Period: Bronze Age
- Dates: c. 2000 BC
- Type site: Settlement Samus IV

The Samus culture (ru: Самусьская культура, romanized: Samus'skaya kul'tura, lit. 'Samus culture') is an Early Bronze Age archaeological culture, around 2000 BC. It was widespread in Tomsk-Narym Basin Southern Western Siberia, on the middle Irtysh and in the upper reaches of the Ob and showed close ties to the neighboring Krotov culture.

== History ==
In Tomsk Oblast, Russia about 10 archaeological sites were discovered within the boundaries of the village Samus and nearby area. The most famous of them is the settlement of Samus IV, which gave its name to the Samus culture of the Bronze Age. The excavations were carried out by Matyushchenko V. I. in 1954, 1955, 1957, 1958, 1969, 1970-1972 and by Vasiliev E. A. in 1995 and 1996.

In 1974 Kosarev M.F. considered, that the Samus culture developed, when Yeniseian speakers assimilated a Paleosiberian group and it was subsequently Samoyedicized and gave rise to cultures ancestral to modern Selkups, consequently, the Selkups are in part Samoyedicized Kets.

In 2010 according to Chernykh and Kuzmineh, Samus - Kizhirovo culture was believed to be succession of the Seima-Turbino culture.

== Geographic extent ==
Location of the Samus culture, with other contemporary cultures c. 2000 BC

On the territory of the Irtysh region the monuments of the Samus community are Chernoozerye VI, Okunevo XI, Rostovkinsky burial ground.

The Rostovkinsky burial ground near Omsk is located on the border of the Krotov culture, Samus'sky culture and steppe areas and more characterizes the Samus'sky - Seima chronological layer in these territories as a whole than any individual culture of this time.

== Economy ==
The main role in the economy was the breeding of sheep, goats and cattle, the breeding of horses and dogs played a lesser role. Hunting played only a marginal role. Farming cannot be proven, apart from the alleged imprints of grains on the inner walls of the vessels.

=== Settlements ===
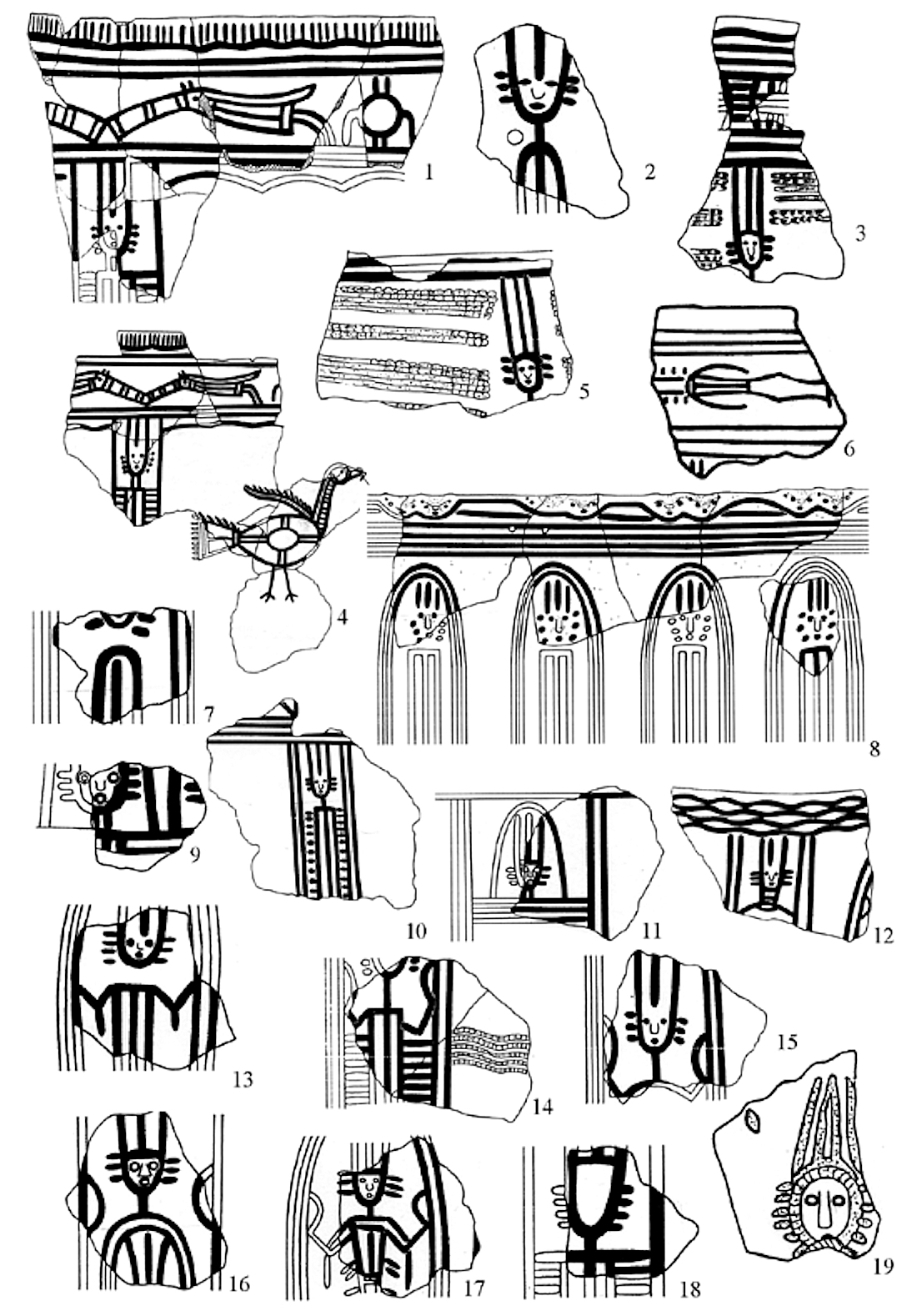
Samus culture, motifs (Samus-IV)

The settlements of the Samus culture were partly fortified with a ditch, partly unfortified. In their interior there were slightly deepened pit houses.

=== Metallurgy ===
The largest settlement Samus IV in the area of the Samus culture was main bronze casting center. Although bronze was already processed by the bearers of the Samus culture, as evidenced by molds and bronze fragments, flint and bone continued to be important materials.

=== Pottery ===
Various vessels can be found in finds from the Samus culture, but in almost all cases they have a flat bottom. The decoration consists of either horizontal lines arranged in waves, or chevrons, meander hooks and hatched triangles. Motifs on Samus pottery find analog with Selkup and Ket ornament.

A particular group is decorated with incised anthropomorphic and zoomorphic motifs (bears), particularly human faces. Associated with them are some figural stone sculptures depicting human and animal heads and phalli.

The Samus crossed sun motif resembles the design on Ket shaman's tamburin.

== Art ==
Representative art: small amulets, tall stone steles and petroglyphs. Bear small figurines amulets presumably had an apotropaic function, they were worn as Bronze pedants or in the form of clay statuettes.

== Beliefs ==
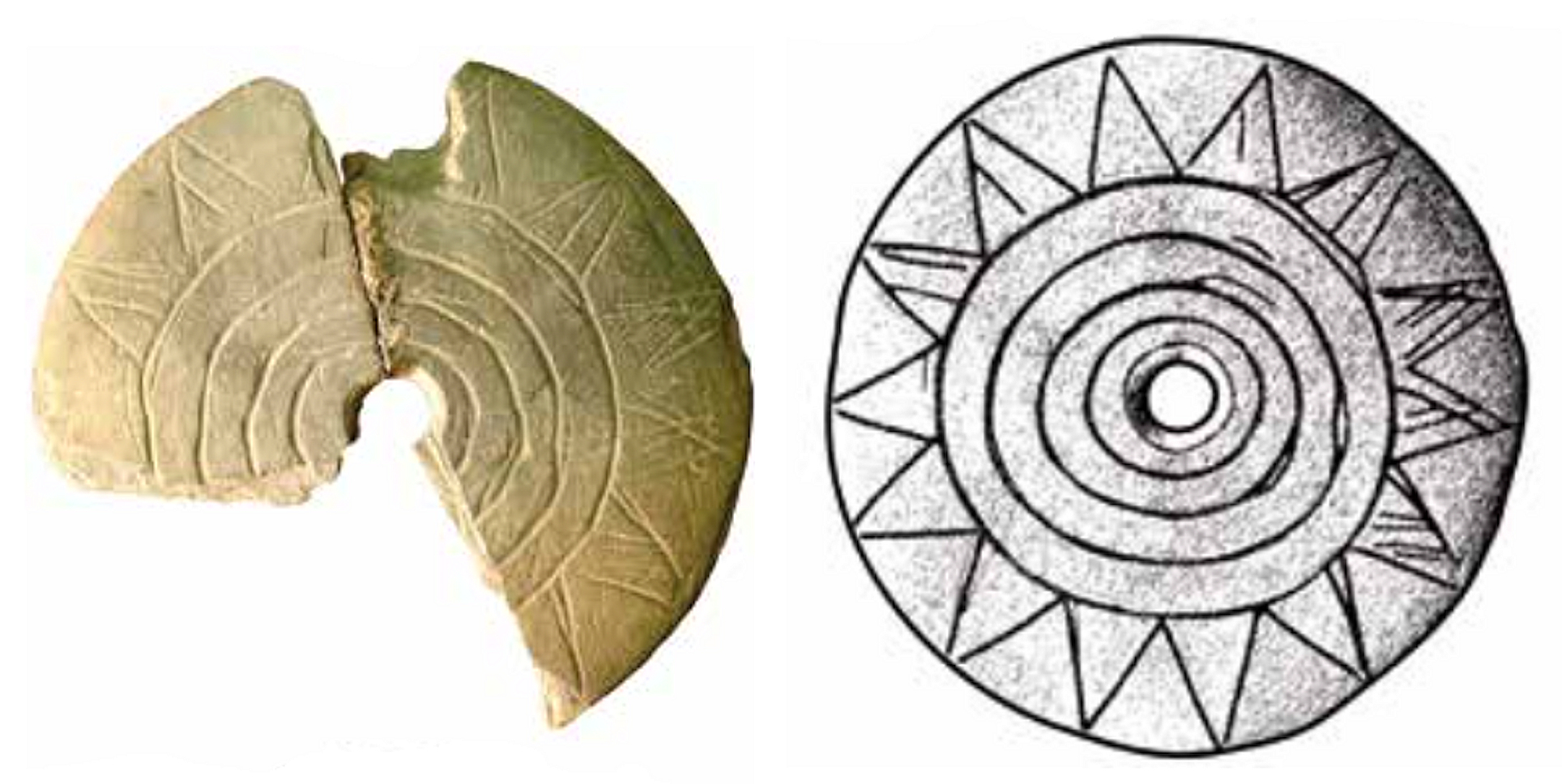
Samus culture, sun symbol (Samus-IV)

Samus worshiped the sun, moon, eagle and swan.

== Burials ==
The dead were buried in shallow graves; mostly burials, more rarely cremations. An upper class of warriors with weapon accessories are noticeable.

== Related cultures ==
Contact existed between the Samus and Okunev cultures in the Achinsk - Mariinsk forest-steppe area. There was also contact with neighboring southwestern cultures such as the Petrovka culture.
