= Ymyyakhtakh culture =

Neolithic culture

- Geographical range: Yakutia
- Period: Late Neolithic to Early Bronze Age
- Dates: c. 2200 BC – 1300 BC
- Preceded by: Belkachi culture
- Followed by: Ust-Mil culture

The Ymyyakhtakh culture (Yakut: Ымыйахтаах, Imıyaxtaax [ɯmɯjäχtäːχ]; Russian: Ымыяхтахская культура, romanized: Ymyyakhtakhskaya kul'tura) was a Late Neolithic culture of Siberia, with a very large archaeological horizon, dating to c. 2200–1300 BC. Its origins seem to be in the Lena River basin of Yakutia, and also along the Yenisei River. From there it spread to the east and west. Individual sites were also found in Taymyr.

It is named after Ymyyakhtakh, a settlement in the Sakha Republic, Russia.

== Description ==
A. Golovnev discusses the Ymyyakhtakh culture in the context of a “circumpolar syndrome”:

"... some features of the East Siberian Ymyyakhtakh culture spread amazingly quickly as far as Scandinavia. Ceramics with wafer prints are found at the Late Bronze Age monuments of the Taimyr Peninsula, Yamal Peninsula, Bolshezemelskaya and Malozemelskaya tundra, the Kola Peninsula, and Finland (not to mention East Siberia and North-East Asia)."

The Ymyyakhtakh made round-bottomed ceramics with waffle and ridge prints on the outer surface. Stone and bone arrowheads, spears and harpoons are richly represented. Armour plates were also used in warfare. Finds of bronze ware are frequent in the burial grounds.

The culture was formed by the tribes migrating from the shores of Lake Baikal to the north, contacting and merging with the local substrate of the Bel'kachi culture.

== Associated sites and populations ==
After 1,700 BC, the Ymyyakhtakh culture is believed to have spread to the east as far as the Chukotka Peninsula, where it was in cultural contact with the Eskimo–Aleut language speakers, and the Paleo-Eskimos.

A ceramic complex comparable to the Ymyyakhtakh culture (typified by pottery with an admixture of wool) is also found in northern Fennoscandia near the end of the second millennium BC. Individuals from the Ymyyakhtakh culture carry a Northern East Asian ancestry that is unambiguously associated with ancient and present-day Uralic-speaking populations as far west as Fennoscandia, making up nearly all of the ancestry of the Nganasans of the Taymyr Peninsula and decreasing in Uralic speakers further west. This suggests that speakers of Proto-Uralic were genetically similar to Ymyyakhtakh individuals.

The Ymyyakhtakh culture was later replaced by the Ust-Mil culture. One study has identified cultural parallels between Ymyyakhtakh culture and the Yukaghirs ethnic group, or perhaps with the Chukchi and Koryaks.

== See also ==
- Prehistory of Siberia
- Syalakh culture
