= Eskimo archery =

Traditional Inuit hunting

Traditional Inuit hunters lack the more elastic timbers used to make bows in temperate and tropical parts of the world. Using sinew cords for the back of the bow, and spruce timber or antler for the belly, however, they build very effective weapons. When hunting polar bears, the bows used are powerful enough, if they do not hit bone, to penetrate completely through the body of the bear.

== Cable-backed bows ==
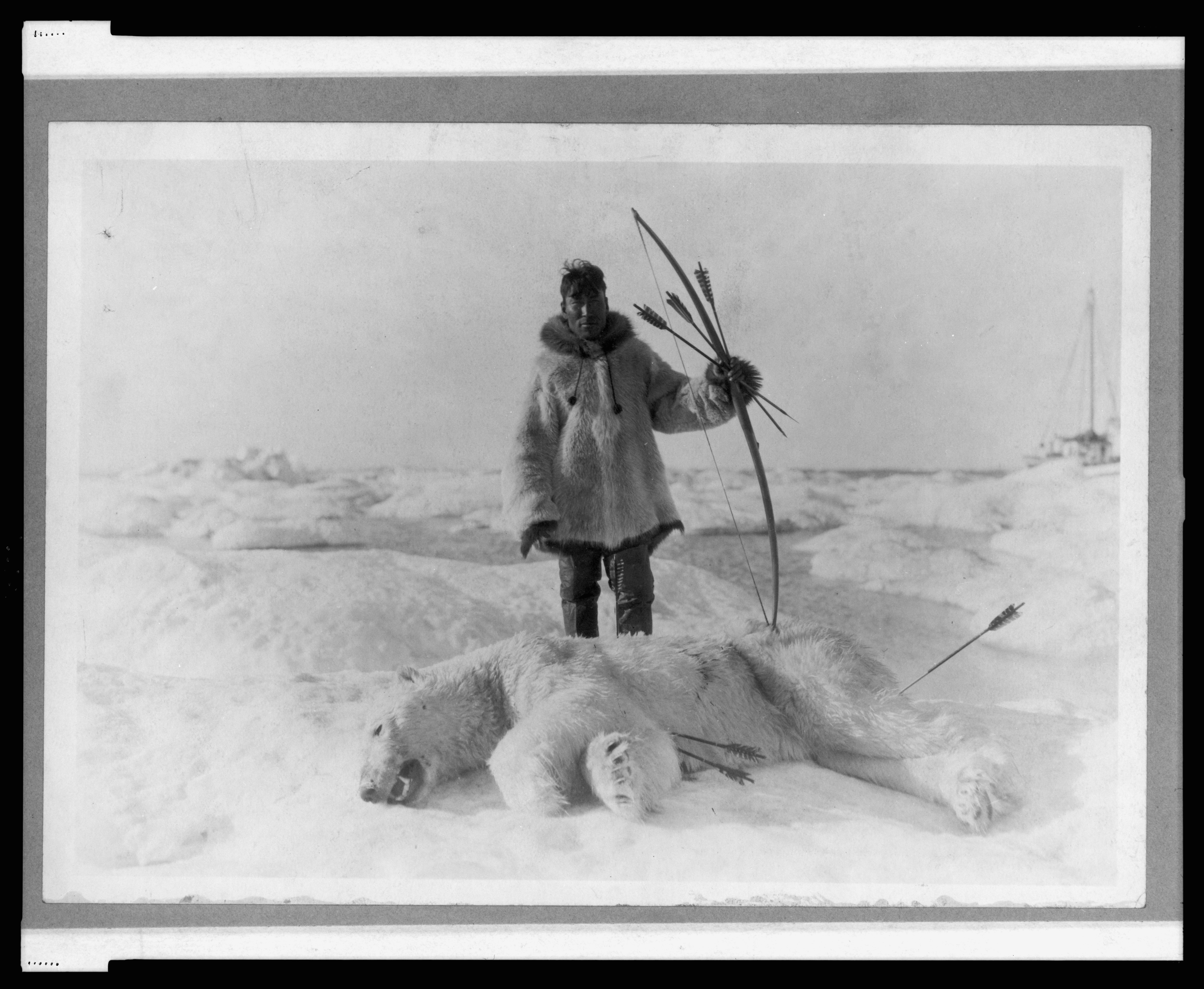
Eskimo hunter and polar bear slain with bow and arrow

The cable backed bow, showing the bow (a) bearing the tensioned cable (b) along the face of it, attached by bindings (c). Finally, the bow strung with the main string (d).

Spruce wood is nearly inelastic in compression, but usually the best available material for the belly of the bow. Driftwood, antler from caribou, or musk ox horn, have also been used. First, the stave is shaped by stone or iron tools, often to a broad shape up to some 5cm wide to help the material to withstand compression. If made from antler or bone, which are stiff and brittle, the stave might be made of several pieces to allow it to bend. The stave could be straight, reflexed, or deflexed.

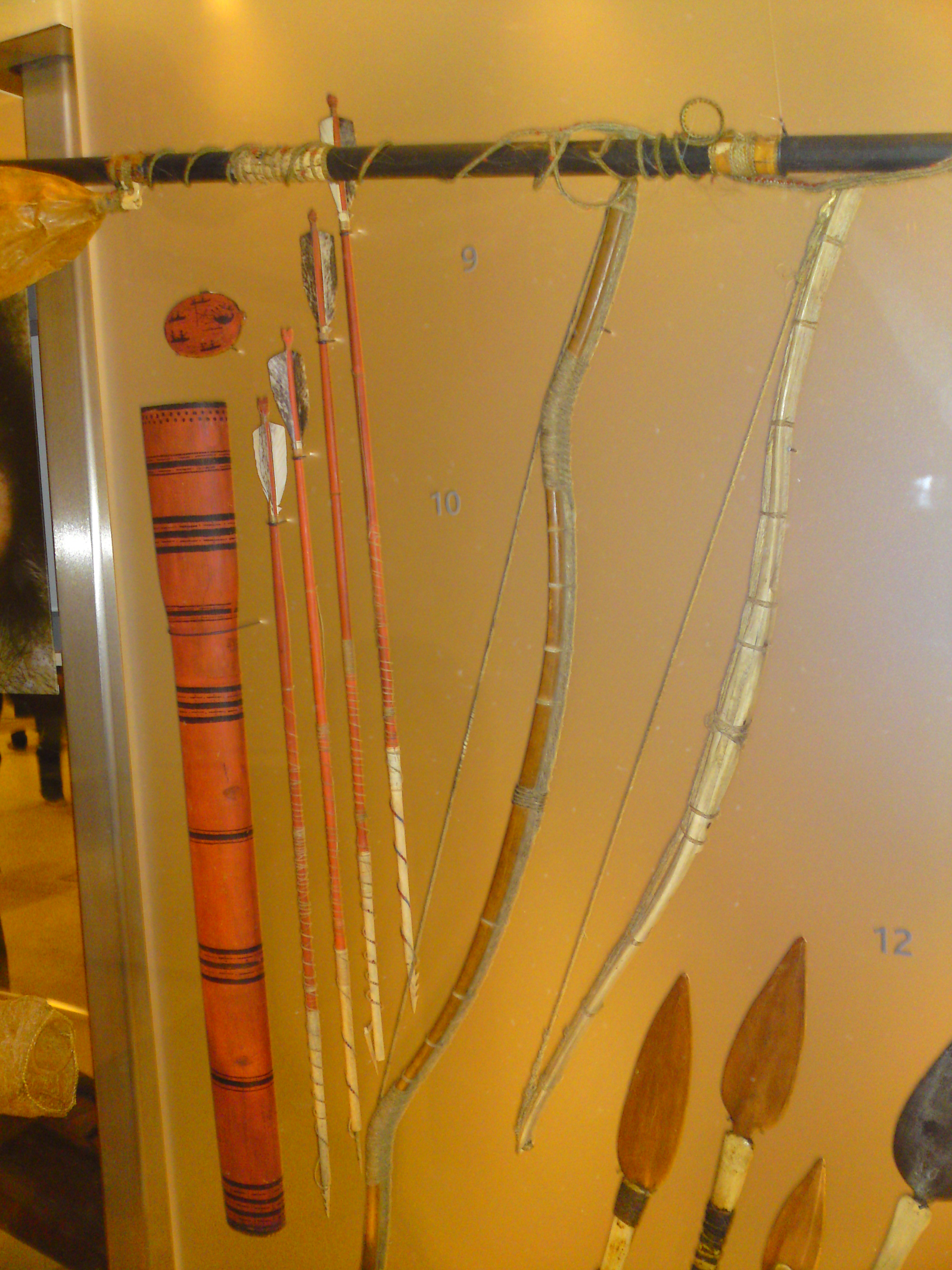
Inuit archery equipment and harpoons

The back of the bow is then made of caribou sinews twisted into cables, and attached to the bowstave and to each other by knotting. (In more temperate climates, animal glue has been used to attach sinew to the backs of bows, but this is not practical for use in the Arctic because animal glue gels almost instantly in freezing air. Additionally, Arctic material culture traditionally often lacked both the fuel supplies and the vessels that are needed for prolonged boiling to make animal glue. Knotted cables can also be raised from the back of the bowstave by spacers, making the bow lighter and more efficient.

The mechanical properties of sinew-backed bows change with changes in humidity, so the bows need frequent adjustment by the archer. The adjustment of tension is done by twisting the backing cables, using short rods of ivory, wood, or bone inserted through the cables.

Varieties of cable-backed bow have been made by non-Inuit cultures. Tlingit and Haida people have also made such bows. A distinct variant of cable-backed bow is the Penobscot bow or Wabenaki bow, invented by Frank Loring (Chief Big Thunder) about 1900. It consists of a small bow attached by cables on the back of a larger main bow.

== Arrows ==
Blunt arrowheads can be used for hunting small game. "Such an arrow kills a small bird or little animal like a lemming or ground squirrel by stunning it, and does not tear a great hole in it. The boys' arrows nowadays are often headed with empty copper cartridge cases, and I have seen one of these shot clean through the body of a small bird."

Arrows used for hunting larger game in traditional Inuit culture are barbed, often with detachable heads. "For hunting the reindeer the arrow had a long, sharp, bayonet-shaped head made of antler, barbed on one edge and fitted loosely into the shaft. As the Eskimos told us, when they hit a deer with one of these arrows the shaft could drop out, leaving the barbed head in the wound, and the deer would go off, "sleep one night, and then die." "Geese, gulls, and other large fowls were shot with arrows that had long, five-sided heads of walrus ivory, not very sharp and barbed on one edge..." Those used for hunting sea otters were red, attached loosely to the barb with a long red cord. The hunter would shoot and then chase the sea otter, which would be hampered in swimming by the trailing arrow shaft. The hunter would be able to see the shaft's bright color and locate the sea otter, exhausted from the chase.

== Quivers ==
One sealskin case protects the bow and arrows against moisture, but also has ivory implements to twist, tighten and adjust the bow and cable if needed.

In the late 19th century, sealskin cases to protect the bows and sealskin quivers were noted. "The bow was carried, strung ready for use, in a sheath of tanned sealskin slung across the shoulders in such a way that it could easily be drawn out under the right arm. Nowadays they carry their rifles in similar sheaths. Attached to the sheath was a quiver, also of sealskin, in which they used to keep an assortment of arrows, some of each kind, according to the hunter's needs."

== Bibliography ==
- Grayson, Charles E., Mary French, and Michael J. O'Brien. Traditional archery from six continents the Charles E. Grayson Collection. Columbia: University of Missouri Press, 2007.
- Grønnow, Bjarne. 2012. "An Archaeological Reconstruction of Saqqaq Bows, Darts, Harpoons, and Lances". Études/Inuit/Studies. 36, no. 1: 23–48.
- Hamilton, T. M. 1970. "The Eskimo Bow and the Asiatic Composite". Arctic Anthropology. 6, no. 2: 43–52.
- Murdoch, John. A Study of the Eskimo Bows in the U.S. National Museum. [Zug, Switzerland]: [Inter Documentation Co.], 1970. Notes: Reproduced from the Annual report of the Board of Regents of the Smithsonian Institution, 1884.
- Stordeur-Yedid, Danielle. Harpons paléo-esquimaux de la région d'Igloulik. [Paris]: A.D.P.F., 1980.
- Wissler, Clark. Harpoons and Darts in the Stefánsson Collection. New York: American Museum of Natural History, 1916.
- The Traditional Bowyers Bible Volume 1. 1992 The Lyons Press. ISBN 1-58574-085-3
- The Traditional Bowyers Bible Volume 2. 1992 The Lyons Press. ISBN 1-58574-086-1
- The Traditional Bowyers Bible Volume 3. 1994 The Lyons Press. ISBN 1-58574-087-X
- The Traditional Bowyers Bible Volume 4. 2008 The Lyons Press. ISBN 978-0-9645741-6-8
