= Hamilton Inlet =

Inlet in Labrador, Newfoundland and Labrador

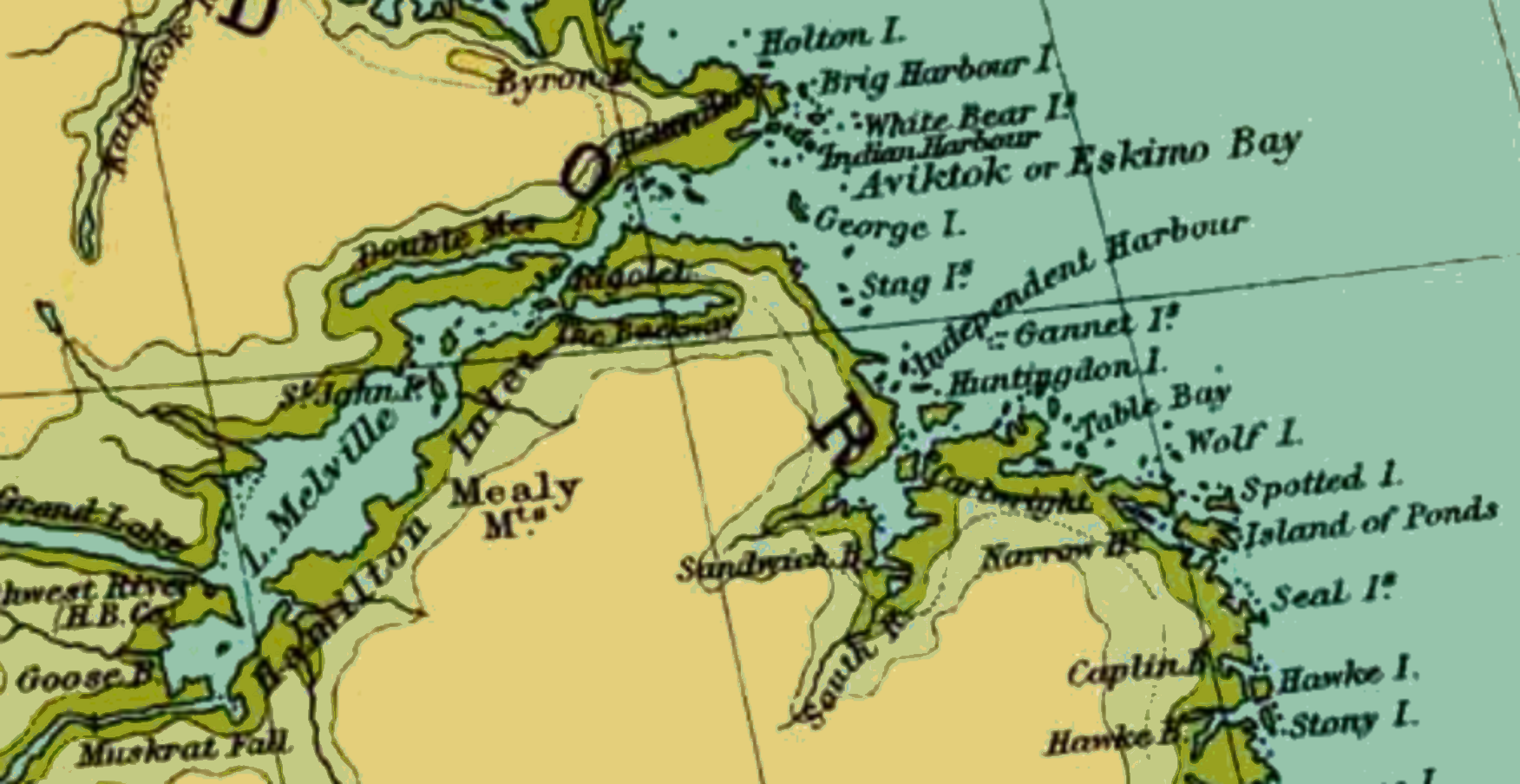
- A map of the Lake Melville/Hamilton Inlet/Groswater Bay system, showing Hamilton Inlet as inclusive of L. Melville

- Location in Labrador
- Location: south central Labrador, between Lake Melville and Groswater Bay
- Coordinates: 54°17′39″N 57°53′56″W
- Basin countries: Canada

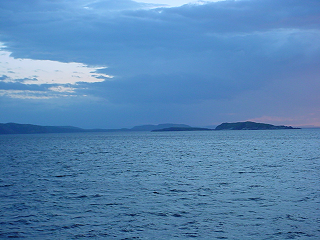
Hamilton Inlet from the ferry between Cartwright and Happy Valley (2006)

Hamilton Inlet is a fjord-like inlet of Groswater Bay on the Labrador coast of the Canadian province of Newfoundland and Labrador. Together with Lake Melville, it forms its province's largest estuary, extending over 140 km (87 mi) inland to Happy Valley-Goose Bay and primarily draining the Churchill River and Naskaupi River watersheds. Lake Melville is generally considered a part of Hamilton Inlet and extends west of the deep, narrow passage at the community of Rigolet.

== Names ==
It was given its present name in honour of Charles Hamilton, commodore-governor of Newfoundland in the early 1800s and former namesake of the inlet's affluent, the Hamilton River (now the Churchill). Inclusive of Groswater Bay, it has also been known as Ivucktoke (Inuttitut: Aivitok); Eskimo or Esquimaux Bay (French: Baie des Esquimaux, "Bay of the Eskimos"); and St Louis Bay (French: Baie-St Louis).

== History ==
In 1586, it was the scene of an Inuit attack on the expedition of John Davis which killed two and wounded others.
