= Syalakh culture =

Early Neolithic culture of Yakutia and Eastern Siberia

- Horizon: Neolithic
- Dates: 5th–4th millennium BCE
- Preceded by: Sumnagin culture
- Followed by: Belkachi culture

The Syalakh culture is an early Neolithic culture of Yakutia and Eastern Siberia.

== Origins ==
It formed in the middle Lena River basin in the fifth and fourth millenniums BCE as a result of the migration of tribes from Transbaikalia, which assimilated the local Sumnagin culture (10,500-6,500 BP) that was preceramic.

== Etymology ==
The culture got its name from Lake Syalakh, located 90 km from the town of Zhigansk in Yakutia (Saha). The first archaeological excavations in this area were conducted under the direction of A. P. Okladnikov in the 1940s.

== Material culture ==
The sites of the carriers of Syalakh culture are marked by the first appearance of polished stone tools, as well as the earliest ceramics (fired clay pottery with a characteristic mesh pattern). Bone harpoons, and bow and arrows have also been found.

More than 50 sites of the Syalakh culture are known. In decorative arts, a central place is occupied by the images of moose, which reflect mythological representation.

The Syalakh culture was followed by the Belkachi culture.

== Language ==
According to linguists, the most likely hypothesis is that representatives of this culture spoke the Dené–Yeniseian language.

== Migration ==
According to Pavel Flegontov et al.,

"The new wave of population from northeastern Asia that arrived in Alaska at least 4,800 years ago displays clear archaeological precedents leading back to Central Siberia. ... the Syalakh culture peoples, spreading across Siberia after 6,500 YBP, might represent the “ghost population” that split off around 6,500-7,000 YBP, and later gave rise to migrants into America."

The ancient Paleo-Eskimo peoples were probably involved in these migrations.

== See also ==
- Prehistory of Siberia
- Settlement of the Americas
- Ymyyakhtakh culture

== Literature ==
- Yakutia archaeological artifacts (in Russian)
- Flegontov, Pavel; Altınışık, N. Ezgi; Changmai, Piya; Rohland, Nadin; Mallick, Swapan; Adamski, Nicole; Bolnick, Deborah A.; Broomandkhoshbacht, Nasreen; Candilio, Francesca; Culleton, Brendan J.; Flegontova, Olga; Friesen, T. Max; Jeong, Choongwon; Harper, Thomas K.; Keating, Denise; Kennett, Douglas J.; Kim, Alexander M.; Lamnidis, Thiseas C.; Lawson, Ann Marie; Olalde, Iñigo; Oppenheimer, Jonas; Potter, Ben A.; Raff, Jennifer; Sattler, Robert A.; Skoglund, Pontus; Stewardson, Kristin; Vajda, Edward J.; Vasilyev, Sergey; Veselovskaya, Elizaveta; Hayes, M. Geoffrey; O’Rourke, Dennis H.; Krause, Johannes; Pinhasi, Ron; Reich, David; Schiffels, Stephan (2019). "Palaeo-Eskimo genetic ancestry and the peopling of Chukotka and North America" (PDF). Nature. 570 (7760): 236–240. doi:10.1038/s41586-019-1251-y. ISSN 0028-0836. PMC 6942545. PMID 31168094.
- Pavel Flegontov, N. Ezgi Altınışık, Piya Changmai, Edward J. Vajda, Johannes Krause, Stephan Schiffels (2016), Na-Dene populations descend from the Paleo-Eskimo migration into America. https://doi.org/10.1101/074476
