= Irmen culture =

Archaeological culture in western Siberia

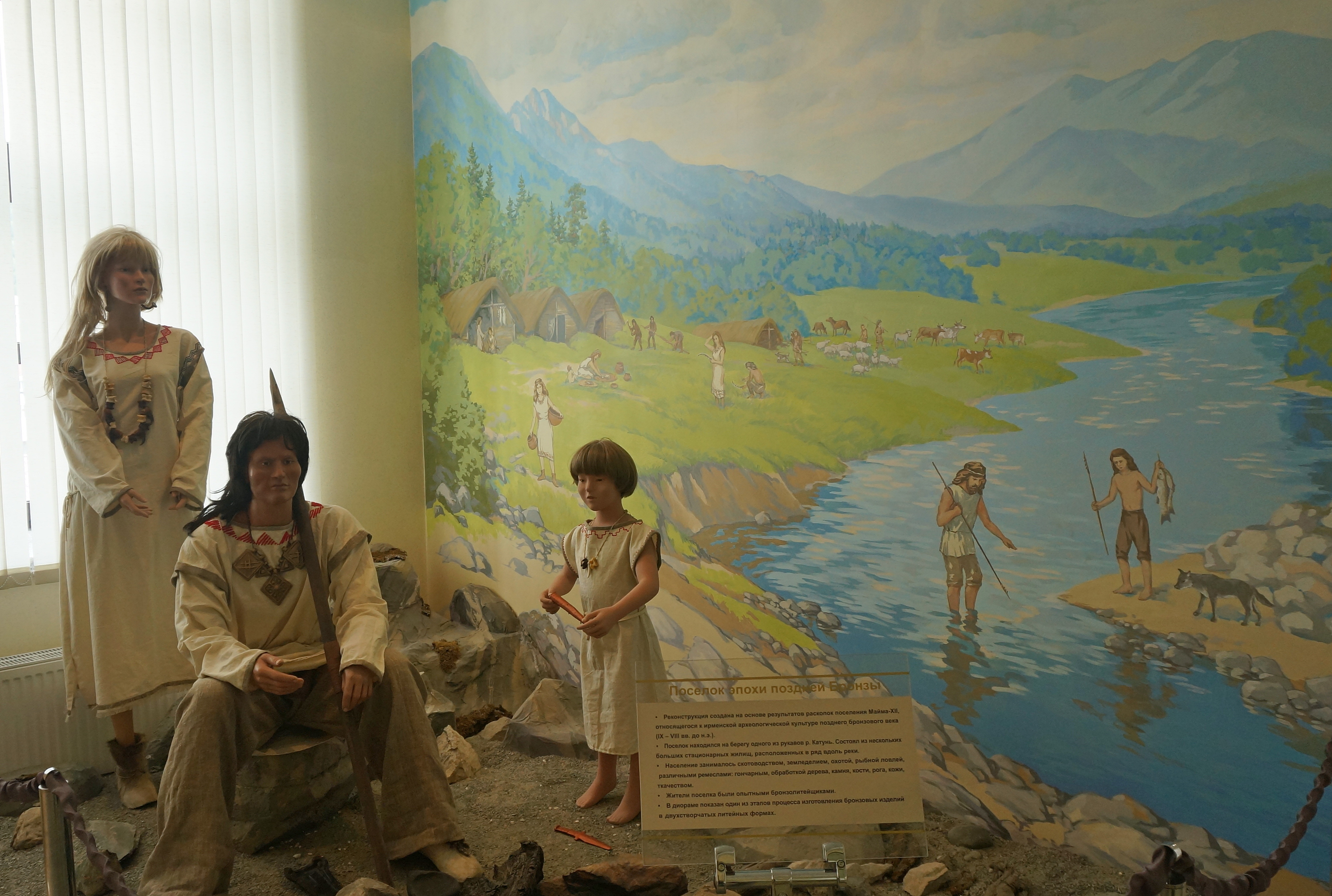
- General location of the Irmen culture ( ), and contemporary Asian polities Irmen culture exhibit, National Museum of the Altai Republic
- Geographical range: South Siberia
- Dates: 9th to 8th centuries BCE
- Preceded by: Karasuk culture, Andronovo culture
- Followed by: Saka culture

City-like, fortified settlement of the Late Irmen culture (late Bronze Age, c. 1100 BC) in Tchitcha, west Siberia

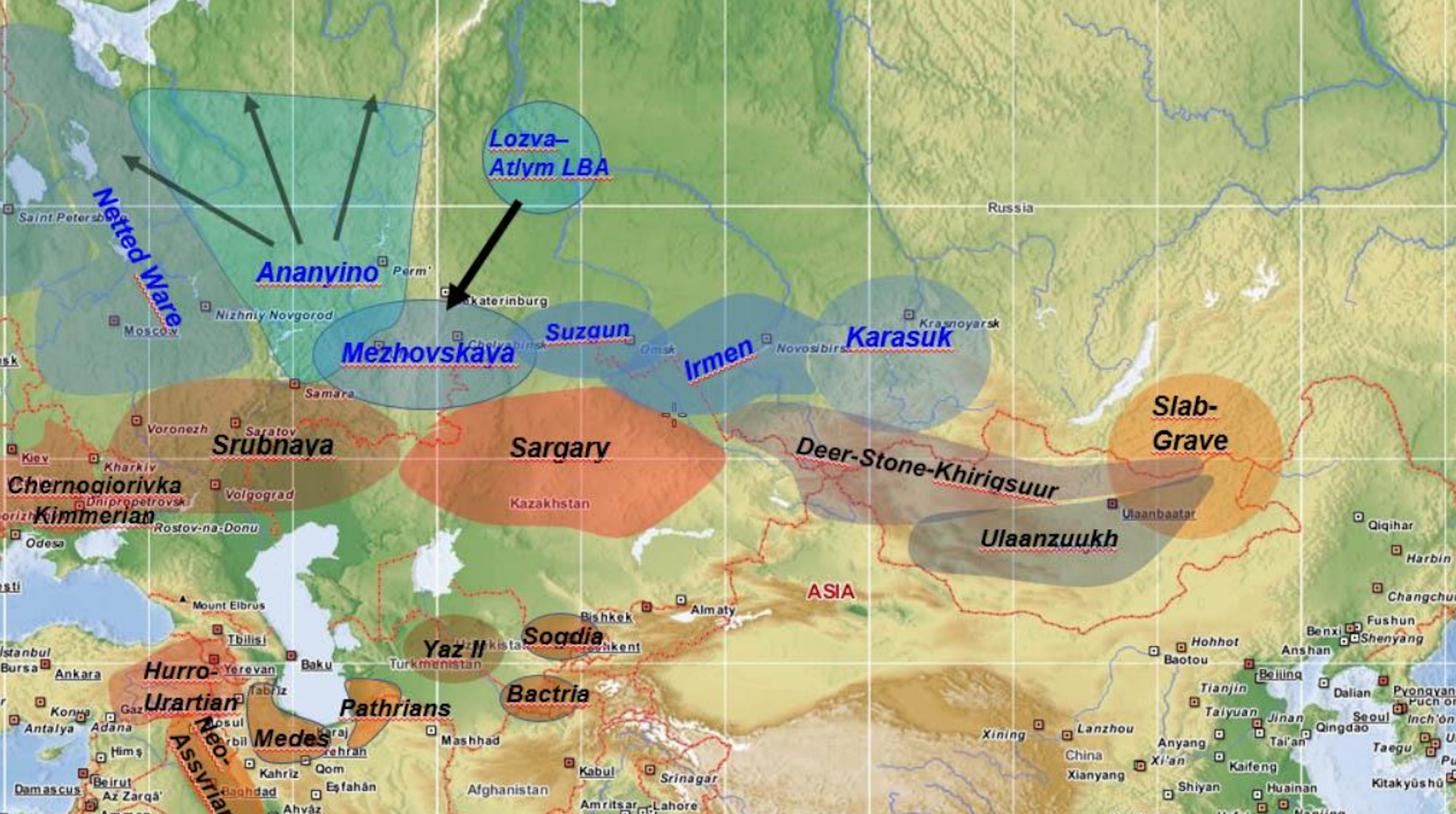
Eurasian archaeological cultures in the Late Bronze Age (ca. 1500–750 BCE) with their approximate ranges (Cultures in the Seima-Turbino zone are indicated with blue letters).

Irmen culture (Russian: Ирменская культура, romanized: Irmenskaya kul'tura) is an indigenous Late Bronze Age culture of animal breeders in the steppe and forest steppe area of the Ob river middle course, north of Altai in western Siberia, dated to around the 9th to 8th centuries BCE. Monuments of this advanced bronze-producing culture include numerous settlements and kurgan cemeteries, the culture was named after Irmen kurgan cemetery now flooded by Novosibirsk reservoir. Irmen culture was discovered and described by N.L.Chlenova in 1970.

Irmen culture period is noted for migrationary waves in two directions, in the beginning of 1st millennium BCE from south from the Karasuk culture, and later in the 1st millennium BCE of northern tribes notable for their cross-decorated ceramics. Migrations raised military tensions, noted in emergence of first fortified settlements with moats and ramparts.

== Economy ==
The mainstay of the Irmen economy was extensive animal husbandry. Stationary houses of Irmen people were large, sometimes exceeding 100 m^{2} (1,100 sq ft). Villages had several such large dwellings. Next to houses were found large deposits of ash.

== Archeology ==
Irmen people buried their deceased by inhumation in kurgan cemeteries, with up to 17 predominantly oriented SW graves in a single kurgan, bodies in crouched position, except when inhumation was conducted after ground thawed or bodies were first exposed, and bone remains were mixed. Kurgans were encircled by sometimes rectangular trenches open at the entrance, deposits include vessels and animal bones of funeral feasts. Individual graves were framed with wooden logs, covered by logs laid across. Accompanying inventory furnished ceramic vessels with food, darts with bronze heads, knives, deceased wore bronze jewelry ornaments of earrings, pendants, bead necklaces. Irmen dishes are of household and finery type with geometric ornament and rounded bottoms, finery dishes have mostly flat bottom. Ornamentation of finery dishes is much closer to the Karasuk vessels than of the household ceramics, but ornamentation is similar for both groups.

== Genetic composition ==
In general, migration wave of Andronovo cultural-historical community peoples, where their physical type (anthropologically ascended to the Southern Eurasian Anthropological Formation), conflated with local peoples (anthropologically ascended to the Northern Eurasian Anthropological Formation) and went on ethnogenesis of the Andronoid cultures. The phenotype features of Irmen people are distinctive, they developed from the local Eneolithic culture, in its formation participated Caucasoid population of Eastern Mediterranean type, migrants from Central Asia.

== Literature ==
- Kosarev M.F., "Bronze Age in Western Siberia", Moscow, 1981 (In Russian)
- Kosarev M.F., "Origin of Irmen culture"//Monuments of Eurasia Stone and Bronze Ages. Moscow, 1966. pp. 169–175, in Kosarev M.F., "Ancient cultures of Tomsk-Narym Ob area", Moscow, 1974 (In Russian)
- Chlenova N.L., Dating of Irmen culture//Chronology and cultural affiliation problems of archaeological sites in Western Siberia, Tomsk, 1970, pp. 133–149 (In Russian)
- Chikisheva T.A., Dynamics of anthropological differentiation in population of southern Western Siberia in Neolithic – Early Iron Age, Professorial dissertation, Novosibirsk, 2010, section Conclusions http://www.dissercat.com/content/dinamika-antropologicheskoi-differentsiatsii-naseleniya-yuga-zapadnoi-sibiri-v-epokhi-neolit (In Russian)
