= Paleo-Eskimo =

Ancient culture in the Arctic prior to Inuit / Yupik

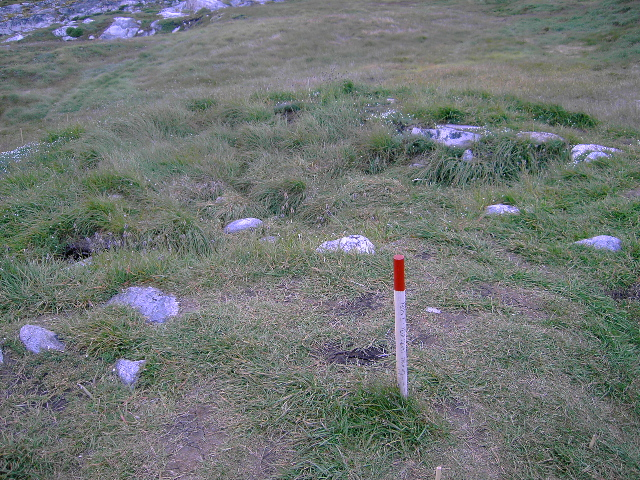
Archaeological site of a hunting ground of the Saqqaq culture near Sermermiut on Disko Bay, Greenland

The Paleo-Eskimo (meaning 'ancient, early, or archaic Eskimos'), also known as Paleo-Inuit, were the peoples who inhabited the Arctic region from Chukotka (e.g., Chertov Ovrag) in present-day Russia across North America to Greenland before the arrival of the modern Inuit and related cultures (formerly called Eskimo). The first known Paleo-Eskimo culture, known as the Early Paleo-Eskimo, had developed by 3900 to 3600 BCE, but were gradually displaced in most of the region, with the last one, the Dorset culture, disappearing around 1500 CE.

Location of Independence Fjord in Greenland and the area inhabited by the Independence I and Independence II cultures

Paleo-Eskimo groups included the Pre-Dorset; the Saqqaq culture of Greenland (2500–800 BCE); the Independence I and Independence II cultures of northeastern Canada and Greenland (c. 2400–1800 BCE and c. 800–1 BCE); the Groswater of Labrador, Nunavik, and Newfoundland and the Dorset culture (500 BCE – 1400 CE), which spread across the North American Arctic. The Dorset were the last major "Paleo-Eskimo" culture in the Arctic before the migration east from present-day Alaska of the Thule, the ancestors of the modern Inuit.

== Terminology ==
The Inuit Circumpolar Council (ICC) has proposed that scientists use Inuit and Paleo-Inuit instead of Eskimo or Paleo-Eskimo. The archaeologist Max Friesen has argued for the ICC's terminology to be adopted, and to capitalize the "P" in Paleo, to adhere to archaeological conventions in naming major traditions. In 2016 Lisa Hodgetts and Arctic editor Patricia Wells wrote: "In the Canadian context, continued use of any term that incorporates 'Eskimo' is potentially harmful to the relationships between archaeologists and the Inuit and Inuvialuit communities who are our hosts and increasingly our research partners"; they suggested using more specific terms when possible (e.g. Dorset and Groswater); they also noted replacement for "Palaeoeskimo" was still an open question and discussed "Paleo-Inuit", "Arctic Small Tool tradition", and "pre-Inuit", as well as Inuktitut loanwords like "Tuniit" and "Sivullirmiut" as possibilities. One 2020 paper in Journal of Anthropological Archaeology, written by Katelyn Braymer-Hayes and colleagues, notes that there is a "clear need" to replace the term "Paleo-Eskimo", citing the ICC resolution, but notes that finding a consensus within the Alaskan context is difficult. In particular, Native Alaskans do not use the word Inuit to describe themselves, and, as such, terms used in Canada such as "Paleo Inuit" and "Ancestral Inuit" would not be optimal; they use the term "Early Arctic Pottery tradition" while noting a lack of consensus in the field.

== Archaeological cultures ==
According to Pavel Flegontov:

Paleo-Eskimo archeological cultures are grouped under the Arctic Small Tool tradition (ASTt), and include the Denbigh, Choris, Norton, and Ipiutak cultures in Alaska, and the Saqqaq, Independence, Pre-Dorset, and Dorset cultures in the Canadian Arctic and Greenland. The ASTt source has been argued to lie in the Syalakh-Bel'kachi-Ymyyakhtakh culture sequence of East Siberia, dated to 6,500 – 2,800 calBP.

=== Use of bow and arrows ===
The relatively rapid spread of Paleo-Eskimos from Alaska as far as Greenland and Labrador may have been helped by their use of the bow and arrow. They are credited with introducing this technology to populations in Eastern Canada by 2000 BCE.

=== Art work ===
First Face is a paleo-Eskimo carving in the shape of an abstract human face made from walrus ivory that is between 3,900 and 3,600 years old. The artifact was located on Devon Island and is one of the oldest-known depiction of a human face created in North America.

== First ancient human to have genome sequenced ==
In February 2010 scientists reported that they had performed the first genome sequencing of an ancient human. Using fragments of hair 4,000 years old, the National Museum of Denmark, the Beijing Genomics Institute and additional collaborating scientific institutions sequenced nearly 80% of a Paleo-Eskimo man's genome. The man was found in Greenland and believed to be from the prehistoric Saqqaq culture.

Based on the genome, scientists believe there was a distinct, separate migration of peoples from Siberia to North America some 5,500 years ago. They noted that this was independent of earlier migrations, whose descendants comprised the historic cultures of the Indigenous peoples of the Americas, as well as later Inuit migration. By 4,500 years ago descendants of this migration had reached Greenland. The remains used for analysis were found in a Saqqaq culture area.

The scientists reported that the man, dubbed "Inuk" (the Inuktitut word for "person"), (Note: Inuk is the singular form of Inuit.) had A+ blood type and genes suggesting he was adapted to cold weather, had brown eyes, brownish skin, dark hair, and would have likely become bald later in life. This marked the first sequencing of an ancient human's genome and the first sequencing of an ancient human's mitochondrial genome.

== Paleo-Eskimo, Athabaskans, and Eskaleut ==
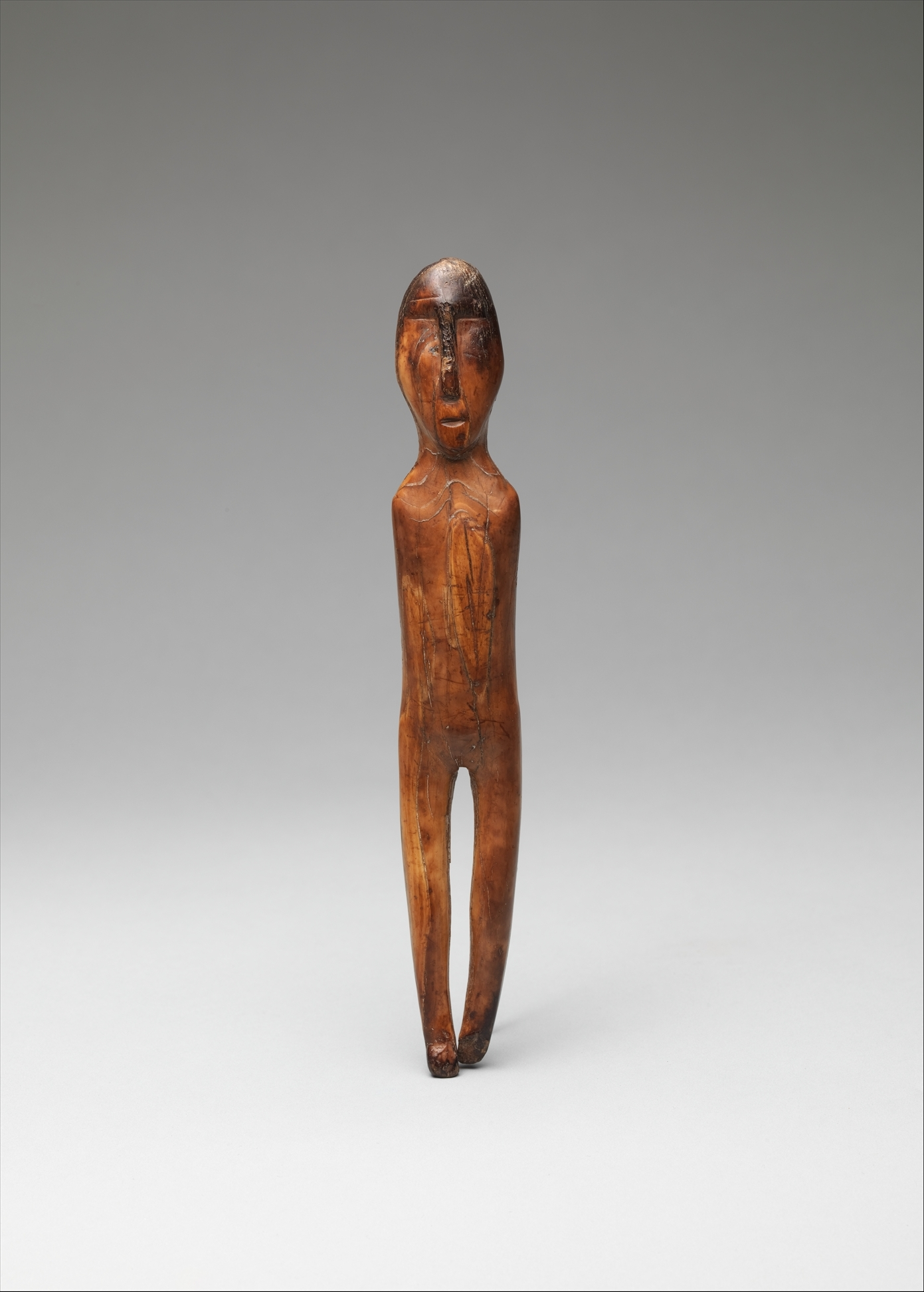
Standing figure of the Old Bering Sea culture; 2nd century BC-1st century AD; walrus ivory; height: 22.5 cm (8.9 in); Metropolitan Museum of Art

A 2017 study identifies Paleo-Eskimo ancestry in Athabaskan and in other Na-Dene-speaking populations. The authors note that the Paleo-Eskimo peoples lived alongside Na-Dene ancestors for millennia. The authors believe that this represents new evidence of a genetic connection between Siberian and Na-Dene populations mediated by Paleo-Eskimos.

According to these scholars, in general, the Paleo-Eskimos had large proportions of Beringian, which includes Chukotko-Kamchatkan and Eskaleut (Eskimo-Aleut), Siberian, and Southeast Asian ancestry.

Furthermore, some geneticists and archaeologists, such as David Reich, have hypothesized that the Paleo-Eskimos spread the Na-Dene languages into the American continent, which would make the Paleo-Eskimos cultural and linguistic relatives (if not ancestors) of Na-Dene peoples.

In 2019, scholars concluded that the Paleo-Eskimo people were the ancestors not only of modern Na-Dene-speaking peoples but also of the Eskimo-Aleut speakers. But this contribution did not come directly; rather, there was a 'Neo-Eskimo' intermediary.

According to Flegontov et al., the later Old Bering Sea archaeological culture came as a result of back-and-forth migrations across the Bering Strait by the tribes associated with the Arctic Small Tool tradition, or their descendants (Old Whaling, Choris, Norton culture, from 3,100 to 2,500 cal. yr BP). These people were mixing with the Chukotko-Kamchatkan speakers of Siberia. Eventually, the Old Bering Sea archaeological culture became the ancestor of the Yup'ik and Inuit, the speakers of Eskimo–Aleut languages.

== Genetics ==
A genetic study published in Science in August 2014 examined the remains of a large number of Paleo-Eskimos and Thule people and determined their maternal haplogroups. Paleo-Eskimos were determined to have largely belonged to the maternal haplogroup D, while Thule people largely belonged to the maternal haplogroup A. The evidence suggested that the ancestors of the Paleo-Eskimos migrated from Siberia to North America in a distinct migration c. 4000 BCE, after which they remained genetically largely isolated. By 1300 CE, the Paleo-Eskimos had been completely replaced by the Thule people (precursors of all modern Inuit and Yupik), who were descended from people of the Birnirk culture of Siberia.

== Sources ==
- Raghavan, Maanasa; DeGiorgio, Michael; Albrechtsen, Anders; et al. (2014). "The genetic prehistory of the New World Arctic" (PDF). Science. 345 (6200) 1255832. doi:10.1126/science.1255832. PMID 25170159. S2CID 353853. Wikidata Q29606641.
