= Timeline of St. John's history =

Coordinates: 47°33′32.4″N 52°42′46.8″W

The timeline of St. John's history shows the significant events in the history of St. John's, Newfoundland and Labrador.

== 15th Century ==
- 1497 – Tradition declares that St. John's earned its name when explorer John Cabot became the first European to sail into the harbour, on June 24, 1497 — the feast day of Saint John the Baptist.

== 16th Century ==
- 1519 – The earliest record of the location appears as São João on a Portuguese map by Pedro Reinel.
- 1527 – When John Rut visited St. John's in 1526 he found Norman, Breton and Portuguese ships in the harbour (during his New World voyage).
- 1527 – On August 3, John Rut wrote a letter to King Henry on the findings of his voyage to North America; this was the first known letter sent from North America. St. Jehan is shown on Nicholas Desliens' world map of 1541 and San Joham is found in João Freire's Atlas of 1546. It was during this time that Water Street was first developed, making it the oldest street in North America.
- 1583 – On August 5, Sir Humphrey Gilbert claimed the area as England's first overseas colony under Royal Charter of Queen Elizabeth I. At the time, he found 16 English ships with 20 French and Portuguese vessels using the harbour; at the time, settlement had developed on the north side of the harbour. There was no permanent English settler population, however, and Gilbert was lost at sea during his return voyage, thereby ending any immediate plans for settlement. The Newfoundland National War Memorial is located on the waterfront in St. John's, at the purported site of Gilbert's landing and proclamation.
- 1585 -- Bernard Drake's Newfoundland Expedition uses St. John's as a base to supply its ships as it warns English fishermen of a Spanish embargo on their trade and decimates the Spanish and Portuguese fishing-industry in the area.

== 17th Century ==
- 1620 – By 1620 the fishermen of England's West Country had excluded other nations from most of the east coast.
- 1627 – St. John was "the principal prime and chief lot in all the whole country".
- 1665 – The town's first significant defenses were probably erected due to commercial interests, following the temporary seizure of St. John's by the Dutch admiral Michiel de Ruyter in June.
- 1673 – The inhabitants were able to fend off a second Dutch attack.
- 1675 – St. John's was by far the largest settlement in Newfoundland when English naval officers began to take censuses around 1675.
- 1680 – Fishing ships (mostly from South Devon) set up fishing rooms at St. John, bringing hundreds of Irish men into the port to operate inshore fishing boats.
- 1689 – The British government began to plan fortifications around 1689, and these were constructed following the retaking of St. John's after the French admiral Pierre Le Moyne d'Iberville captured and destroyed the town late in 1696. The French attacked St. John's again in 1705 and 1708, and devastated civilian structures with fire.
- 1699 – Anglican Diocese of Eastern Newfoundland and Labrador founded.

== 18th century ==
- 1705 – The town was besieged by the French in Queen Anne's War (War of the Spanish Succession).
- 1709 - 1 January 1709 [O.S. 21 December 1708], during Queen Anne's War, (the Battle of St. John's) the town was captured and burned by the French. The French, however, left and the town was reoccupied by the British later that year.
- 1711 - Abortive British attack on Placentia, Newfoundland.
- 1713 - Treaty of Utrecht removes French from Placentia. Subsequently, British fortifications decay.
- 1743 - Major reconstruction of Fort William by the British.
- 1745 - Naval squadron from Newfoundland sent to support successful Anglo-American attack on Louisbourg, Nova Scotia.
- 1756-63 - Seven Years' War, (French and Indian War)
- 1762 – French capture Bay Bulls and St. John's in June. British Forces under command of Colonel William Amherst recapture town in September; the final battle of the Seven Years' War in North America at the Battle of Signal Hill.
- 1763 - Fort William rebuilt and construction begins on Queen's Battery, Crows Nest Battery and Fort Amherst. Treaty of Paris forces France to abandon all her possessions in North America except the islands of St. Pierre and Miquelon and fishing rights on the north west coast of Newfoundland
- 1781 – Government House (Newfoundland and Labrador) completed.
- 1789 – The first Congregationalist Church in Newfoundland was built on the site of the LSPU Hall.

== 19th century ==
- 1800 - United Irish Uprising in Newfoundland
- 1804 – Anderson House (St. Johns) built.
- 1812 – St. John served as a naval base during both the American Revolutionary War and the War of 1812.
- 1817 - St John fires
- 1819 - St John fire
- 1839-55 – Basilica of St. John's the Baptist, St. John's built.
- 1846 - Great Fire of 1846
- 1849 – Bank of British North America Building built.
- 1850 – Colonial Building opened.
- 1856 – The Veiled Virgin was transported to Newfoundland.
- 1860 - Arrival of Edward, Prince of Wales for first North American royal tour
- 1873 – George Street United Church built.
- 1881 – St. Patrick's Church (St. John's) completed. St. Patrick's Church was consecrated on August 28.
- 1885 – Cathedral of St. John the Baptist completed in September.
- 1892 – Great Fire of 1892, The most famous major fire in St. John in the 19th century
- 1894 – Masonic Temple (St. John's, Newfoundland and Labrador) built.
- 1897 – Cabot Tower (Newfoundland) built.

== 20th century ==
- 1901 – Guglielmo Marconi received the first transatlantic wireless message in St. John's in December from his wireless station in Poldhu, Cornwall.
- 1907 – Nickel Theatre opened on July 1.
- 1919 – St. John's was the starting point for the first non-stop transatlantic aircraft flight, by Alcock and Brown in a modified Vickers Vimy IV bomber, in June 1919, departing from Lester's Field in St. John's and ending in a bog near Clifden, Connemara, Ireland.
- 1924 – National War Memorial (Newfoundland) unveiled on July 1.
- 1925 – Newfoundland Margarine Company Limited opened.
- 1946 – Newfoundland Herald founded on May 12.
- 1959 – Confederation Building (Newfoundland and Labrador) was built and replaced the Colonial Building.
- 1966 – Janeway Children's Health and Rehabilitation Centre founded.
- 1967 – Avalon Mall opened.
- 1979 - Oil discovered in the Grand Banks.
- 1982 – Hotel Newfoundland opened.
- 1995 – St. John's Hindu Temple built.

== 21st century ==
- 2000 – Grace General Hospital, the first maternity hospital in the province, closed its doors for good.
- 2001 – The former Janeway Children's Health and Rehabilitation Centre, located on Janeway Place, closed its doors permanently, as a new Janeway location was established in the Health Sciences Centre.
- 2001 – Mile One Centre established.
- 2001 – Nickel Film Festival created.
- 2002 – Johnson Geo Centre established.
- 2003 – Railway Coastal Museum established.
- 2005 – The Rooms established.
- 2005 – In July, the flight was duplicated by American aviator and adventurer Steve Fossett in a replica Vickers Vimy aircraft, with St. John's International Airport substituting for Lester's Field (now an urban and residential part of the city).
- 2010 - Popular show Republic of Doyle is created and produced out of St. John's.
- 2020 – COVID-19 pandemic in Newfoundland and Labrador.

== See also ==
- List of years in Canada
