= List of buildings in St. John's, Newfoundland and Labrador =

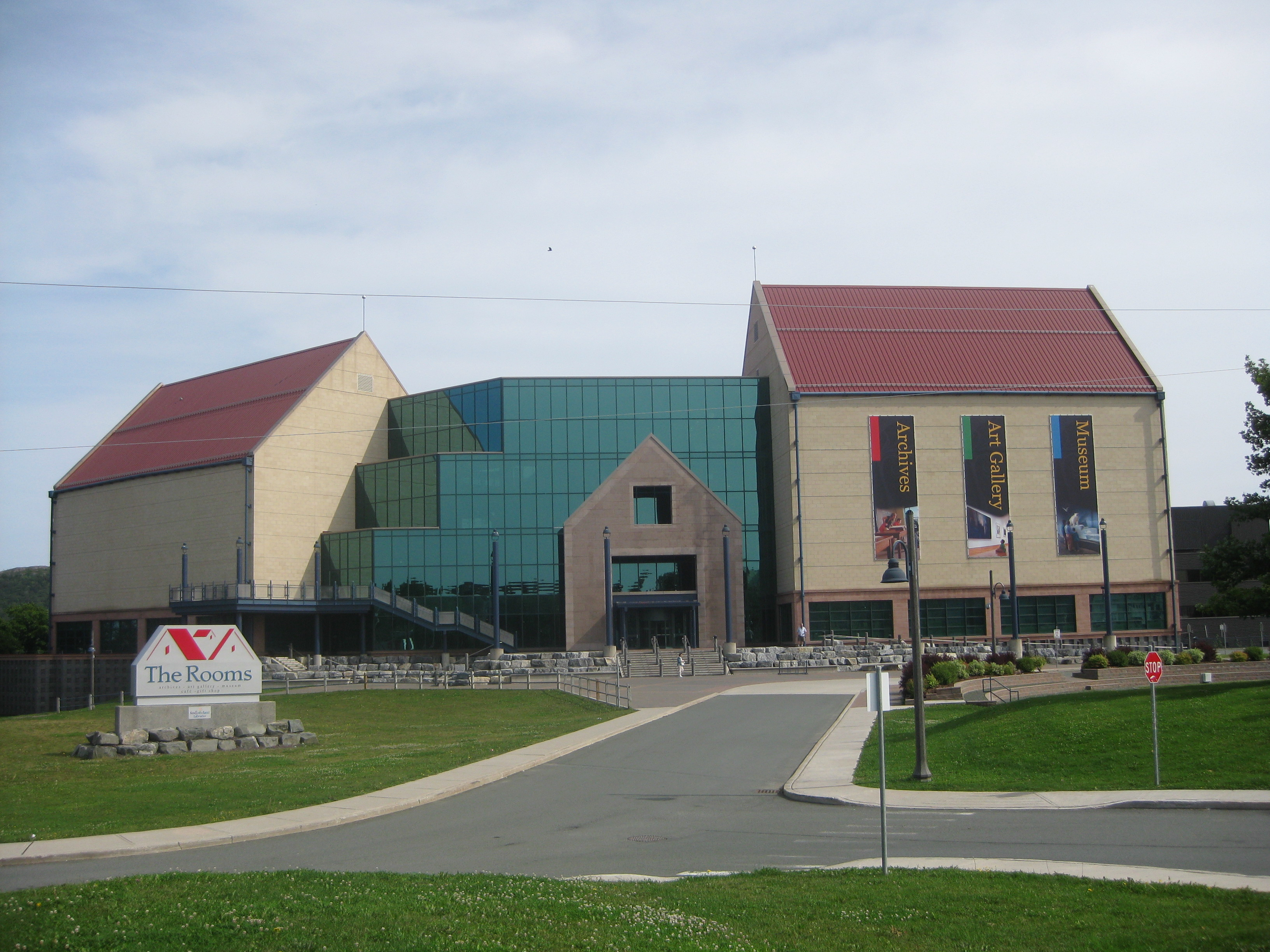
The Rooms

This is a list of notable buildings in St. John's, Newfoundland and Labrador, Canada.

== Museums ==
- Johnson Geo Centre
- Railway Coastal Museum
- The Rooms

== Government Buildings ==
- Colonial Building
- Confederation Buildings
- Government House
- Supreme Court of Newfoundland and Labrador

== Office Towers ==
- 351
- Fortis Building

== Schools ==
- Bishops College (now defunct)
- Gonzaga High School
- Holy Heart of Mary High School
- Memorial University of Newfoundland
- Prince of Wales Collegiate
- Saint Bonaventure's College

== Religious buildings ==
- Basilica of St. John the Baptist
- Cathedral of St. John the Baptist
- George Street United Church
- Masjid-an-Noor
- St. John's Hindu Temple

== Historical Buildings ==
- Bank of British North America Building
- Cabot Tower
- Masonic Temple
- Murray Premises

== Other ==
- Arts and Culture Centre
- Avalon Mall
- CFS St. John's
- The Fluvarium
- Hotel Newfoundland
- Memorial Stadium
- Mile One Centre
- St. John's Convention Centre

== See also ==
- Architecture of St. John's, Newfoundland and Labrador
- List of tallest buildings in St. John's, Newfoundland and Labrador
