= Architecture of St. John's, Newfoundland and Labrador =

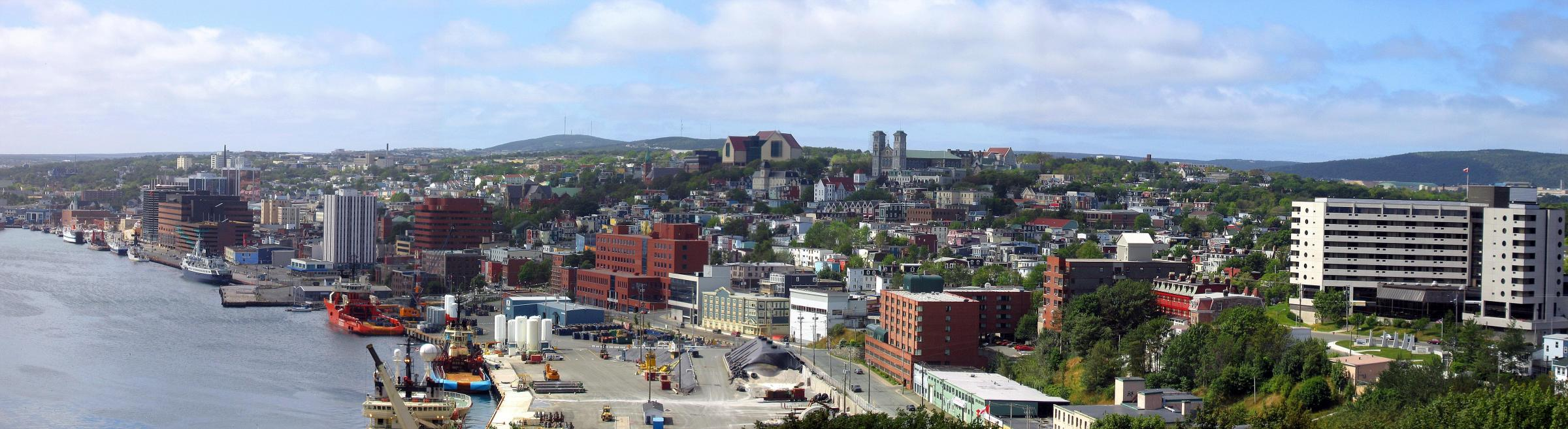
Downtown St. John's.

The architecture of St. John's, in Newfoundland and Labrador, Canada, has a style distinct from that of the rest of Canada, and its major buildings are remnants of its history and prestige as the first British colonial capital. The city of St. John's has had a long history, with inhabitation dating to the 16th century onwards. As the city grew, so, too, did the landscape. Buildings took a variety of styles according to the styles and means available to build the structures. Starting as a fishing outpost for European fishermen, St. John's consisted mostly of the homes of fishermen, sheds, storage shacks, and wharves. Of course, these structures were small and constructed out of wood. Like many other cities of the time, as the Industrial Revolution took hold and new methods and materials for construction were introduced, the landscape changed as the city grew in width and height. The Great Fire of 1892 destroyed most of the downtown core, and most residential and other wood-frame buildings date from this period. Often compared to San Francisco because of its hilly terrain and steep maze of residential streets, housing in St. John's is typically painted in bright colours, unlike most other parts of Canada.

Due to St. John's being the oldest English settlement in North America to have grown into a city, many of its buildings have been designated by either the Minister of the Environment (upon the recommendations of the Historic Sites and Monuments Board of Canada) or the Heritage Foundation of Newfoundland and Labrador as historic places.

As of 2012, St. John's contains 21 National Historic Sites of Canada.

== Prior to 1820 ==
Although St. John's has been inhabited since the 16th century, there remain very few buildings constructed before 1820. Starting in 1764 the Governor of Newfoundland, Hugh Palliser imposed restrictions on the construction of homes in St. John's to discourage permanent settlement. These restrictions remained in place until 1820. Most of the buildings built during this period were small, single story wooden homes and buildings related to the fishery.

The most common form of residential building in this period was a one-and-a-half or two-and-a-half story wooden house with a hip roof. One notable building that survives from this period was Anderson House. Located at the base of Signal Hill, it was originally built as a military barracks in 1804 and is likely the oldest surviving building in St. John's. Two other examples of buildings of the same style are Mallard Cottage and Martin McNamara House. The dates of construction for these two buildings are unknown but they were likely constructed around the same time as Anderson House.

== 1820 to 1846 ==
After the restrictions on building residential structures were lifted, more substantial structures started to be built in St. John's. After the fires in the early 1800s the government took steps to reduce the risk of fire in the city. Residents were encouraged to build with brick or stone but because of the expense of these two materials wood remained a popular building material. As a result, the core of the city was destroyed in the Great Fire of 1846 and few buildings built in this period have survived to the present day.

The oldest church in St. John's, St. Thomas' Anglican Church, was built in 1835-36 for the British Garrison at St. John's. The church is an example of early gothic revival architecture, a style which would be seen later in larger churches like St. Patricks and the Anglican Cathedral of St. John the Baptist. The architect who designed the church was Patrick Keough who also designed Government house and the Presentation Convent. The church was built mostly of local spruce and pine. The design of the church is noteworthy because of the spire, a feature which was not common before the 1840s.

Other buildings that survive from this period are:

- Christ Church, Quidi Vidi (1842)
- Retreat Cottage, Kennas Hill (1834)
- Stone House, Kennas Hill (1835)
- Harris Cottage, Monkstown Road (1833)
- St. Michaels Convent, Bonaventure Ave. (1827)

== 1846 to 1892 ==
After the Great Fire of 1846 there was a period of reconstruction in St. John's. After the fire the use of brick and stone as building material became much more popular. Many of the stone buildings from this period survive to this day.

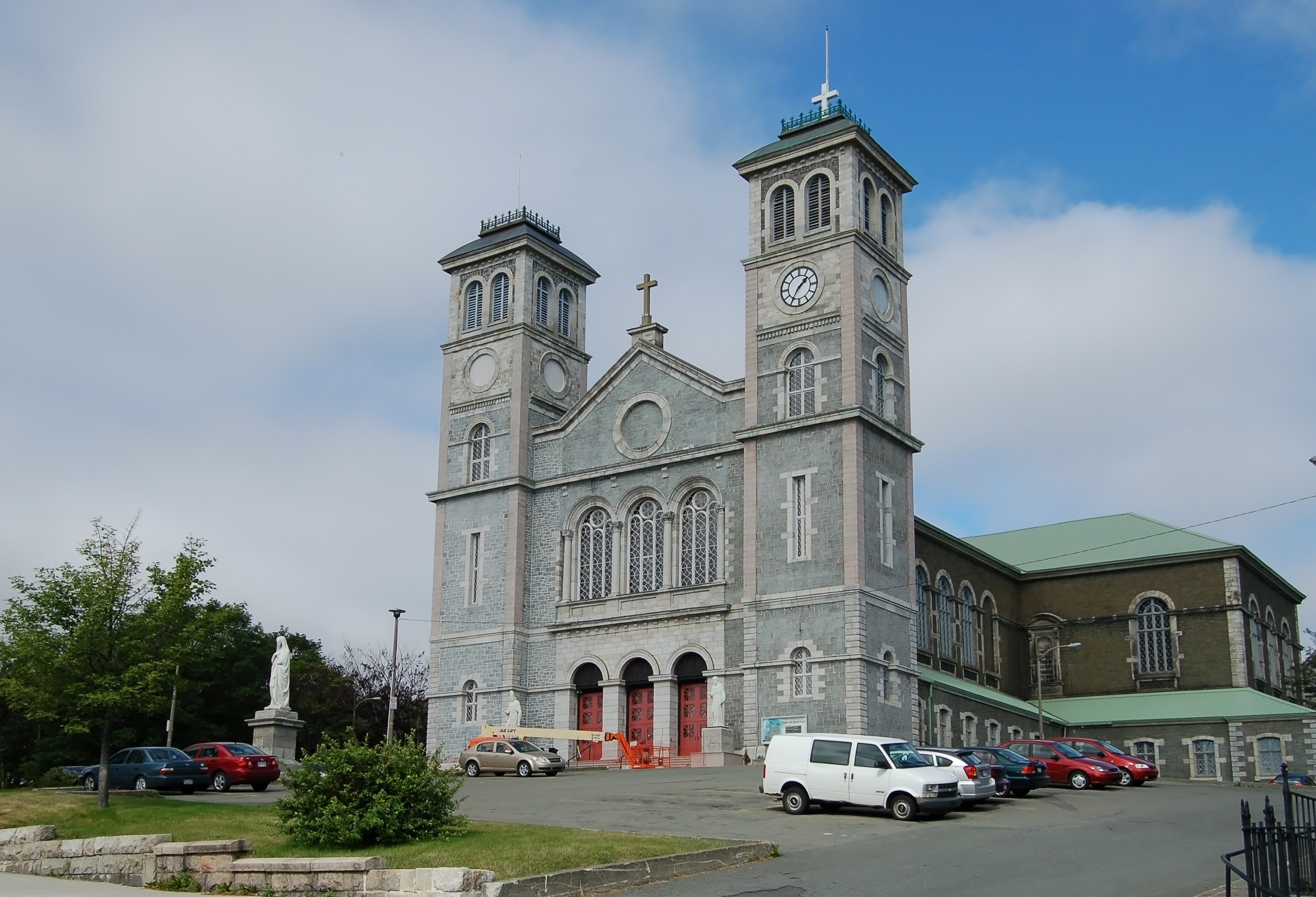
Façade of the Basilica of St. John the Baptist

In 1855 the largest church in St. John's, the Basilica of St. John the Baptist, was completed. The construction was started in 1839 but was delayed while the city was rebuilding after the fire. The Basilica was designed by Ole Joergen Schmidt of Hamburg in the Lombard Romanesque style. It is notable for being one of the earliest examples of Romanesque Revival architecture in North America. The structure of the building was made of sandstone from a quarry on Kelly's Island in Conception Bay. The building was faced with limestone from Galway and the mouldings, cornices and window frames were made from granite from Dublin. Upon its completion the Basilica was the second largest church building in North America. It survived the Great Fire of 1892 and remains the largest church in Newfoundland and the centre of the Roman Catholic Church in Newfoundland.

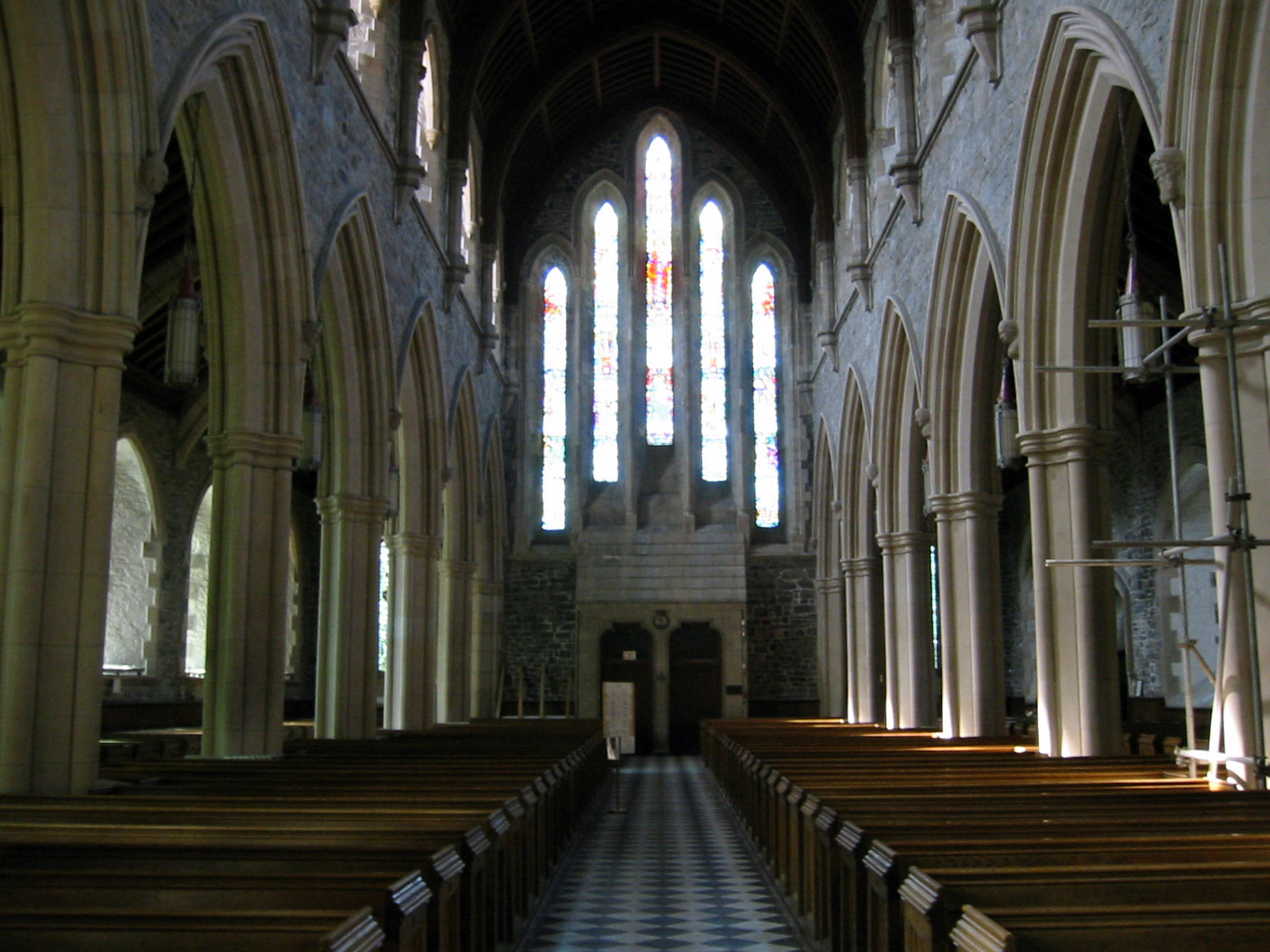
Nave of the Cathedral of St. John the Baptist

The other major church constructed during this period was the Anglican Cathedral of St. John the Baptist. The cornerstone for the cathedral was laid in 1843 but construction was delayed when the Great Fire of 1846 destroyed the stone that was imported for the building. Construction was resumed after the fire and the Nave of the building was completed in 1850. The construction of the Choir and Transept sections was not completed until 1885, giving the cathedral a Latin Cross shape. The cathedral was designed by the architect George Gilbert Scott, one of the most prolific architects in Britain, in the Gothic Revival style. This style would prove to be popular in St. John's and would become the dominant style of church construction in the city. The roof and interior were destroyed in the Great Fire of 1892 but the church was rebuilt using the original plans. The original design had included a spire but it was never built. The congregation is currently raising money to complete the spire but to date they have not raised enough to pay the expected cost of $3,000,000.

There are several commercial buildings from this period that have survived to this day. Most notably, the section of Water Street between Becks Cove and Adelaide St. This includes The Murray Premises, The O'Dwyer Block, The Thompson Building and the Yellow Belly Corner Building. The Murray Premises is a group of three buildings surrounding a central courtyard. The building was originally used by the merchant Richard O'Dwyer as a warehouse for exporting salt fish and importing other goods. At the time it was built there would have been many similar buildings along the waterfront but this is the only one that survives. The other three buildings on this block are mercantile buildings. They are all three-and-a-half story buildings with space for storefronts on street level and dwelling space on the upper floors. Because the buildings on this block were made of stone they were able to withstand the Great Fire of 1892 with minimal damage while nearby wooden buildings were destroyed.

Other notable buildings that survive from this period are:

- Bank of British North America Building, Duckworth St. The first commercial bank in Newfoundland built in 1849.
- St. Patrick's Church, Patrick Street. Roman Catholic Church built in the gothic revival style. Tallest building in Newfoundland from its completion in 1881 until the completion of the Confederation Building in 1959.
- Colonial Building, Military Road. The seat of government in Newfoundland from 1850 to 1959. Built in the Classical Revival Style.
- Devon House, Duckworth St. A distinctive stone house on the east end of Duckworth Street.
- George Street United Church. A gothic revival style church built in 1873. Notable for being one of the only concrete sheathed churches in St. John's.
- Kelvin House, Rennie's Mill Road. Built in 1885. One of the first examples of a Second Empire style house in St. John's.

== 1892 to 1949 ==
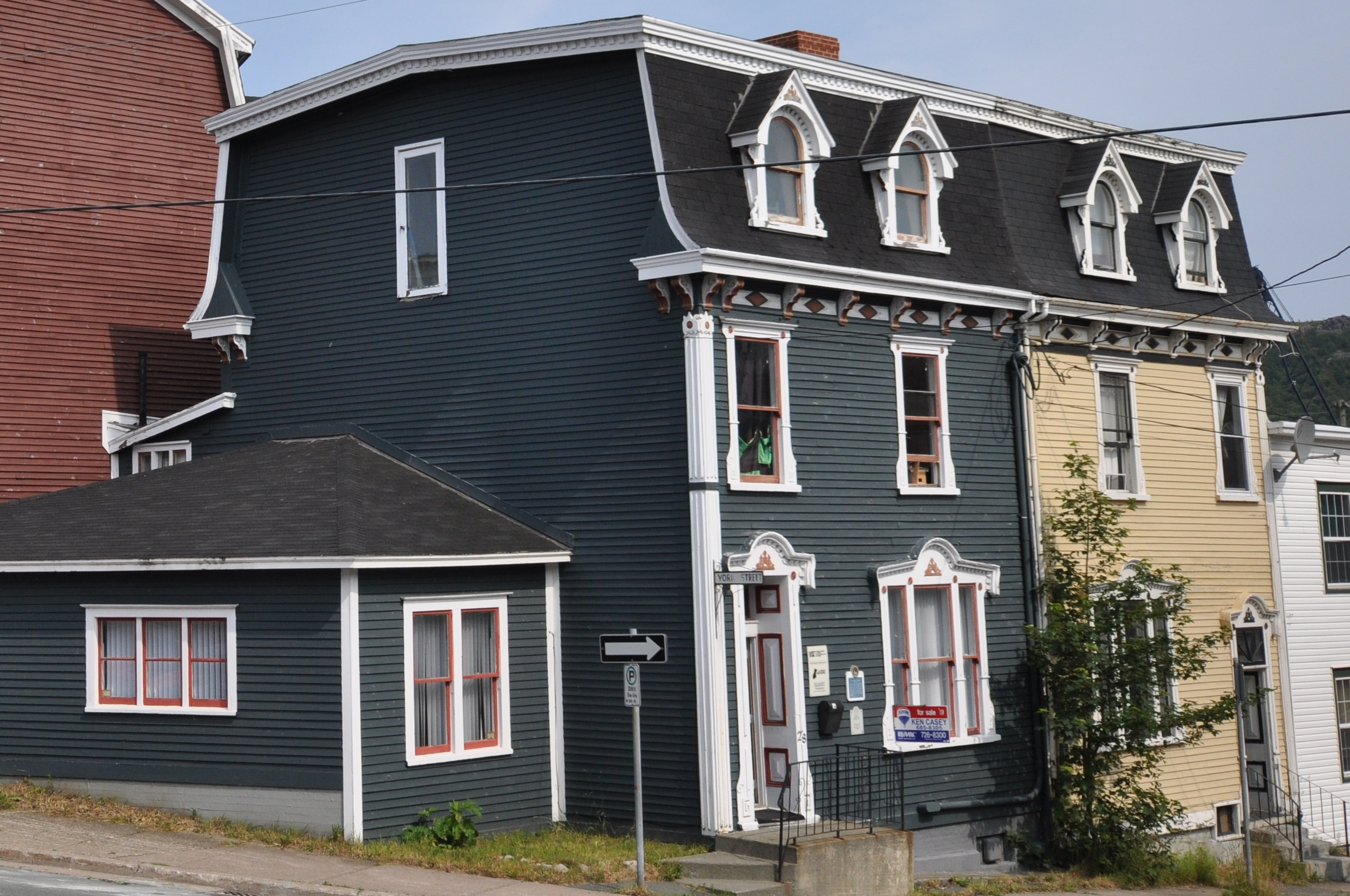
Second Empire style houses on Cochrane St.

In 1892 a fire swept through the downtown core of St. John's, destroying nearly all of the wooden buildings and many of the stone and brick bath houses as well leaving naked people to run through the burning streets. In the wake of the fire there was a large influx of money from insurance and donations which led to a building boom in the city. Many of the buildings that were built during this time are still standing and give the downtown of St. John's its distinctive character.

The most popular style for residential construction during this time was the Second Empire style. This style of building was also known locally as the "Southcott Style" after the firm of J. & J.T. Southcott who introduced it to the city. The distinguishing features of this style of house are a mansard roof and hooded dormer windows on the top floor. The houses are typically three stories and are attached on one or both sides. Examples of Southcott and Southcott-inspired row houses can be seen throughout the downtown, with notable examples on Gower Street and Cochrane Street.

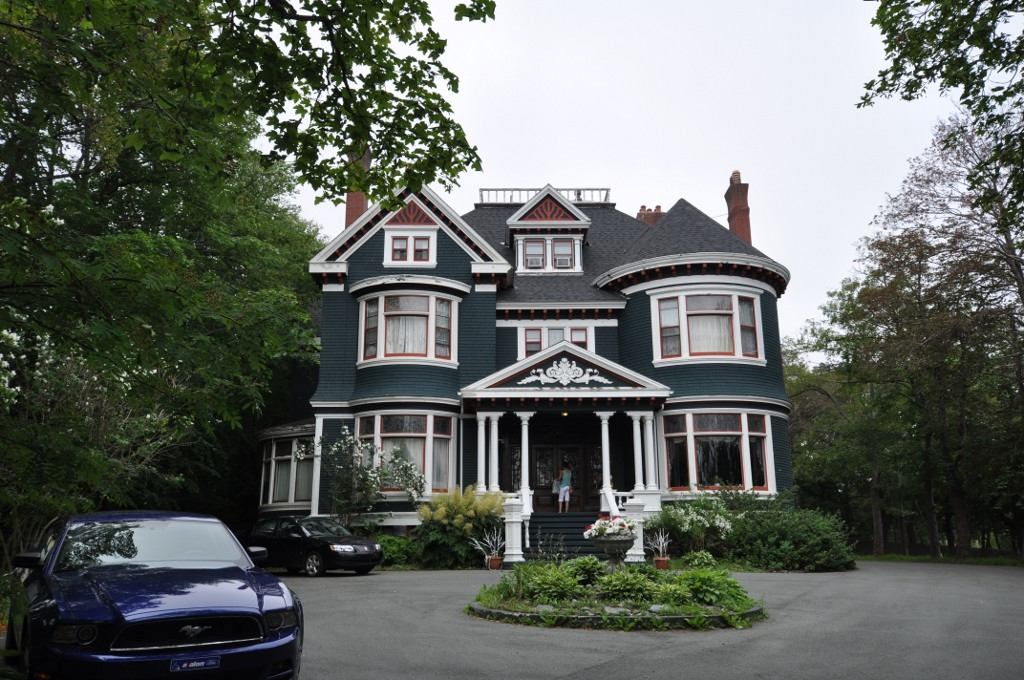
Winterholme

The other major style of residential architecture after the great fire of 1892 was the Queen Anne style. The Queen Anne style was reserved for the largest and most luxurious houses at the time. The most notable example of this style of architecture is Winterholme, located next to Bannerman Park in the center of the city. The house was built in 1905 for Sir Marmaduke Winter, a wealthy merchant in St. John's. At the time it was one of the most expensive homes ever built in the city. It has many features typical of Queen Anne revival style architecture including an asymmetrical facade, pediments over the porch and windows, stacked bay windows and a circular corner tower. Other houses built in the Queen Anne Style during this time include Howard House on Garrison Hill.

== Tallest buildings ==
Rank	Building	Image	Height	Floors	Year	Notes	Ref
1	Confederation Building		64 m (210 ft)	11	1959	The home of the Newfoundland and Labrador House of Assembly.	
2	St. Patrick's Church		60 m (197 ft)	—	1888	Tallest building in St. John's from 1888 to 1959 (71 years). St. Patrick's Church closed in 2022.	
3	John Cabot Building (Cabot Place II)		59 m (194 ft)	13	1996	Tallest office building in Newfoundland and Labrador.	
4	Cabot Place I		49 m (161 ft)	12	1988		
5	Fortis Place		48 m (157 ft)	12	2014		
6	351 Water Street	351 Water Street, St. John's NL	47.6 m (156 ft)	12	2013	Tallest mixed-use building in Newfoundland and Labrador.	
7=	Delta St. John's Hotel		47 m (154 ft)	12	1987	Tallest hotel in Newfoundland and Labrador.	
7=	Scotia Centre		47 m (154 ft)	11	1987		
9	Basilica of St. John the Baptist		45.7 m (150 ft)	—	1855	Tallest building in St. John's from 1855 to 1888 (33 years).	
10	Southcott Hall		45 m (148 ft)	15	1964		

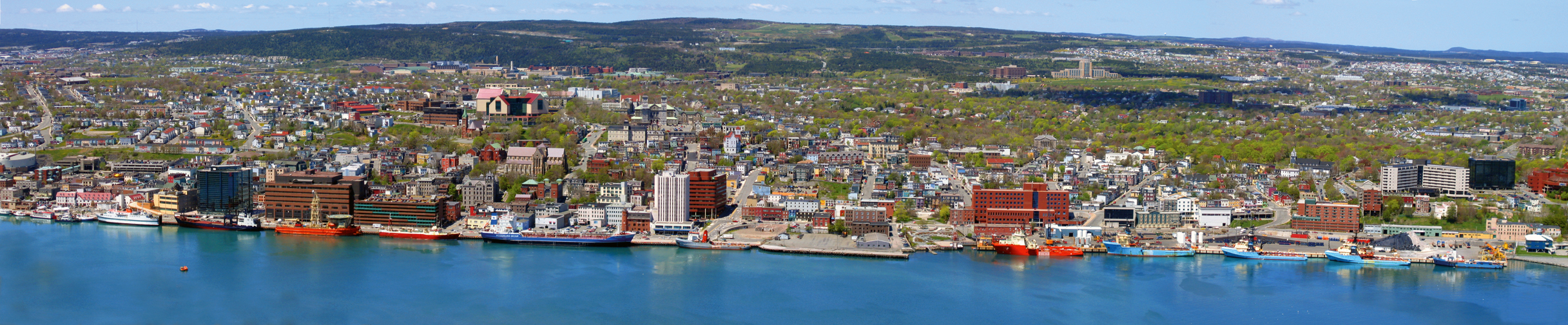
Downtown St. John's

== See also ==
- List of tallest buildings in St. John's, Newfoundland and Labrador
- List of buildings in St. John's, Newfoundland and Labrador
- Downtown St. John's
