= Gilbert Browning =

Newfoundland merchant (1821–1882)

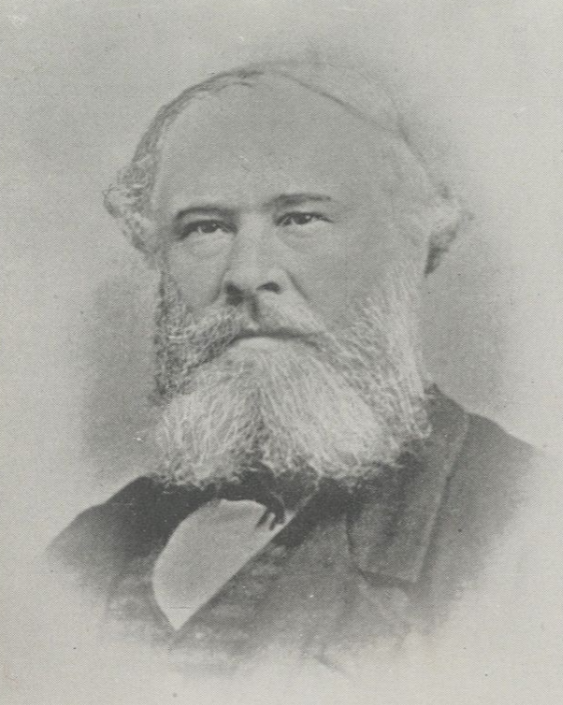
- Born: October 19, 1821; Newmilns, Ayrshire, Scotland, U.K.
- Died: September 1, 1882 (aged 60); Glasgow, Scotland, U.K.
- Occupation: Merchant
- Spouse: Elizabeth Blair (m. 1842)
- Children: Donald Browning

Gilbert Browning (October 19, 1821 – September 1, 1882) was a Scottish-born merchant in Newfoundland Colony.

== Business career ==
Browning was born on October 19, 1821 Newmilns, Ayrshire. He came to Newfoundland after the Great Fire of 1846 to help rebuild the premises of Baine, Johnston and Company. Browning set up his own businesses soon afterwards, operating a cod oil refinery, sawmill and boat factory. He later set up the firm of G. Browning & Son which operated a bakery. He was also involved in mining. Browning died during a visit to Glasgow for his health.

== Legacy ==
His son Donald served in the Newfoundland House of Assembly. Although the original premises of the company were destroyed by fire, G. Browning & Sons became one of the founding companies of Browning Harvey Limited, a beverage bottling company which is still in operation to this day.
