= List of tallest buildings in St. John's, Newfoundland and Labrador =

Tall buildings in St. John's, Newfoundland and Labrador
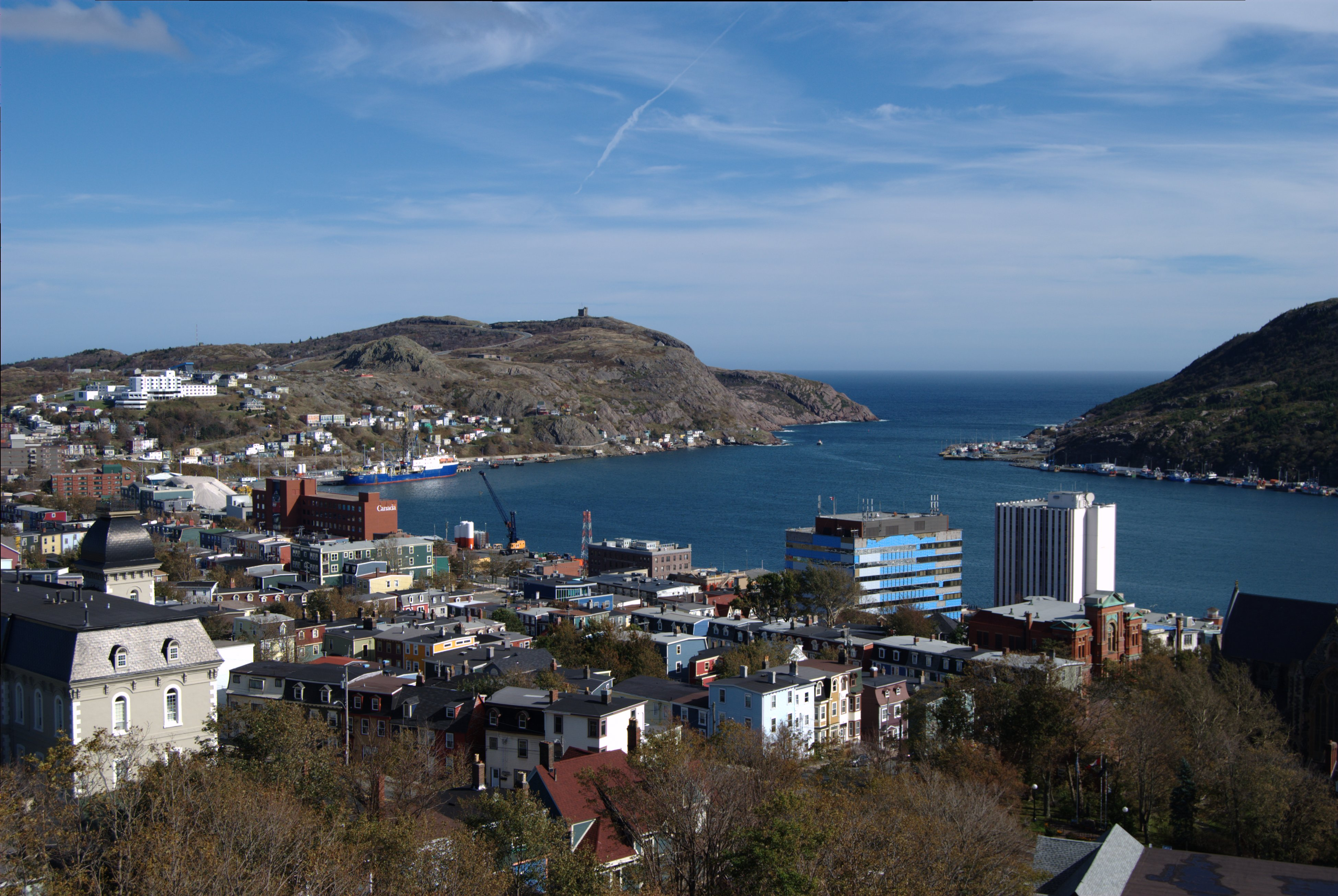
- Downtown St. John's with the harbour in the background
- Tallest building: Confederation Building (1959)
- Tallest building height: 64 m (210 ft)

Number of tall buildings
- 10 stories or more: 11
- Taller than 50 m (164 ft): 3

St. John's is the largest city and metropolis in Newfoundland and Labrador, with a population of 192,326. St. John's has three buildings that stand taller than 50 m (164 ft). The tallest building in the city is the 11-storey, 64 m (210 ft) Confederation Building. The majority of the high-rises in the city are in the downtown area; however, Confederation building is located outside of the downtown. The tallest building downtown is the 59 m (194 ft) John Cabot Place, with 13 floors.

Due to strict height regulations in the downtown area, the city has seen very few high-rises built in comparison to other cities of similar size. In 2010, the city amended the height regulation for a small area of Water Street to allow for higher density buildings. The latest development in this area was 351 Water Street; at 47.4 m (156 ft) and 11 floors.

== Tallest buildings ==
This list ranks buildings in St. John's that stand at least 30 metres (98ft) tall, based on CTBUH height measurement standards. This includes spires and architectural details but does not include antenna masts.

Rank	Building	Image	Height	Floors	Year	Notes	Ref
1	Confederation Building		64 m (210 ft)	11	1959	The home of the Newfoundland and Labrador House of Assembly.	
2	St. Patrick's Church		60 m (197 ft)	—	1888	Tallest building in St. John's from 1888 to 1959 (71 years). St. Patrick's Church closed in 2022.	
3	John Cabot Building (Cabot Place II)		59 m (194 ft)	13	1996	Tallest office building in Newfoundland and Labrador.	
4=	Cabot Place I		49 m (161 ft)	12	1988		
4=	Fortis Place		49 m (161 ft)	12	2014		
6	351 Water Street	351 Water Street, St. John's NL	47.4 m (155 ft)	11	2013	Tallest mixed-use building in Newfoundland and Labrador.	
7=	Delta St. John's Hotel		47 m (154 ft)	12	1987	Tallest hotel in Newfoundland and Labrador.	
7=	Scotia Centre		47 m (154 ft)	11	1987		
9	Basilica of St. John the Baptist		45.7 m (150 ft)	—	1855	Tallest building in St. John's from 1855 to 1888 (33 years).	
10	Southcott Hall		45 m (148 ft)	15	1964		
11=	TD Place		43 m (141 ft)	11	1981		
11=	Atlantic Place		43 m (141 ft)	9	1975	A 7-storey office building built atop a 3-storey indoor shopping mall. Can support the addition of 10 more floors when necessary.	
13	St. Andrew's Presbyterian Church		41 m (134 ft)	N.A	1904		
14	Sheraton Hotel Newfoundland		40 m (131 ft)	9	1982	In 2008, St. John's based Fortis Inc. properties bought the Newfoundland Hotel and converted it to the Sheraton Hotel Newfoundland in 2009.	
15	The Rooms		38 m (125 ft)	5	2004	This building houses the Newfoundland and Labrador provincial museum, art gallery, and archives.	
16=	St. John's Court House		37 m (121 ft)	4	1901		
16=	Sir Humphrey Gilbert Building		37 m (121 ft)	7	1959	Federal office building.	
18	Baine Johnson Centre		36 m (118 ft)	8	1988		
19	Hilton Garden Inn		35.05 m (115 ft)	12	2019	Topped-out.	
20	Natural Resources Building		34 m (111 ft)	8	1970		

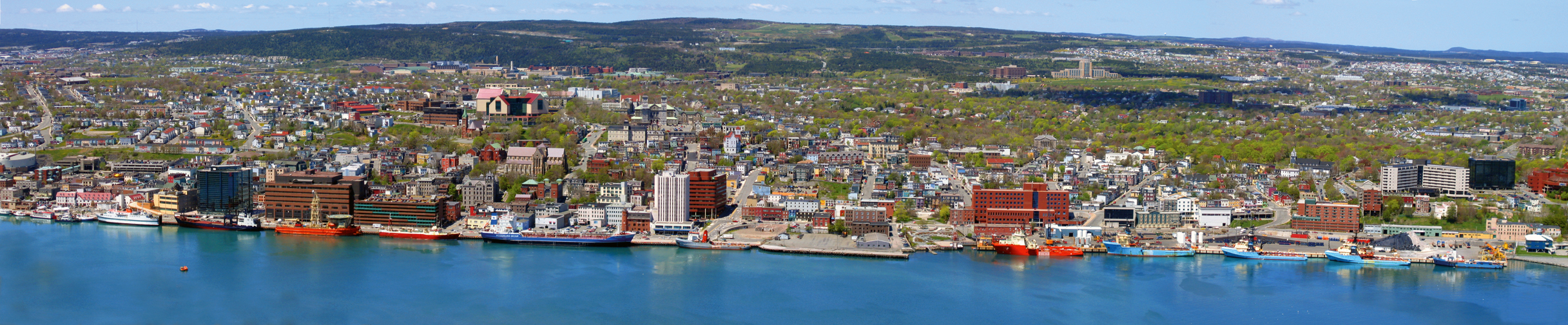
Downtown St. John's

== Tallest under construction or proposed ==
Building	Height	Floors	Status	Notes	Ref
Tiffany Estates B & C	57.9 m (190 ft)	16	Proposed	A pair of almost identical residential buildings. If built, Tiffany Estates B & C would become the fourth tallest buildings in Newfoundland and Labrador.	

== See also ==
- List of tallest buildings in Atlantic Canada
- Architecture of St. John's, Newfoundland and Labrador
- Canadian Centre for Architecture
- Canadian architecture
- Downtown St. John's
- Society of Architectural Historians
