= Bank of British North America =

British-Canadian bank (1836–1918)

- Type: Charter company
- Industry: Banking
- Founded: 1836
- Defunct: 1918
- Fate: Merged into the Bank of Montreal
- Headquarters: 5 Gracechurch Street, London, England

Bank of British North America Act 1836
- Act of Parliament
- Parliament of the United Kingdom
- Long title: An Act to enable the Proprietors or Shareholders of a Company called "The Bank of British North America" to sue and be sued in the Name of any One of the Directors or of the Secretary for the Time being of the said Company.
- Citation: 6 & 7 Will. 4. c. xcix

Dates
- Royal assent: 4 July 1836

Text of statute as originally enacted

The Bank of British North America was founded by royal charter issued in 1836 in London, England. British North America was the common name by which the British colonies and territories that now comprise Canada were known prior to 1867.

By 1899, the bank had branches in London, Brantford, Hamilton, Toronto, Montreal, Ottawa, Kingston, Midland, Quebec City, Saint John, N.B., Brandon, Winnipeg, Fredericton, Halifax, Victoria, Vancouver, Rossland, Kaslo, Trail, Ashcroft, Greenwood, Atlin, Bennett, B.C., and Dawson City. It was the first bank operating in British Columbia.

Like the other Canadian chartered banks, it issued its own bank notes, 1852 to 1911. The end dates are the final dates appearing on notes, which may have circulated for some time after. The Bank of Canada was established through the Bank of Canada Act of 1934 and the banks relinquished their right to issue their own currency.

The Bank of British North America merged with the Bank of Montreal in 1918.

== Historic buildings ==
On the Registry of Historical Places of Canada are the former Bank of British North America in Dawson, Yukon (1899) and Winnipeg, Manitoba (1903–04).

=== 49 Yonge Street, Toronto ===
The first Toronto branch, designed by John George Howard was built in 1845, with exterior work by John Cochrane and Brothers, at the northeast corner of Yonge Street and Wellington. The current building, designed by architect Henry Langley, replaced the original in 1875. A restaurant occupies the ground floor with offices above.

=== 276 Duckworth Street, St. John's ===
The former Bank of British North America in St. John's, Newfoundland, built in 1849 is on the Registry of Historical Places of Canada. This bank building was constructed in 1849, after the St. John's fire of 1846, by Halifax architect David Stirling.

=== 1211 King Street West, Toronto ===
The former branch constructed in 1906–07 at the southwest corner of King Street West and Dufferin Street in the Parkdale area of Toronto continued to operate as a branch of the Bank of Montreal until its closure in 2018.

== Gallery of Branches ==
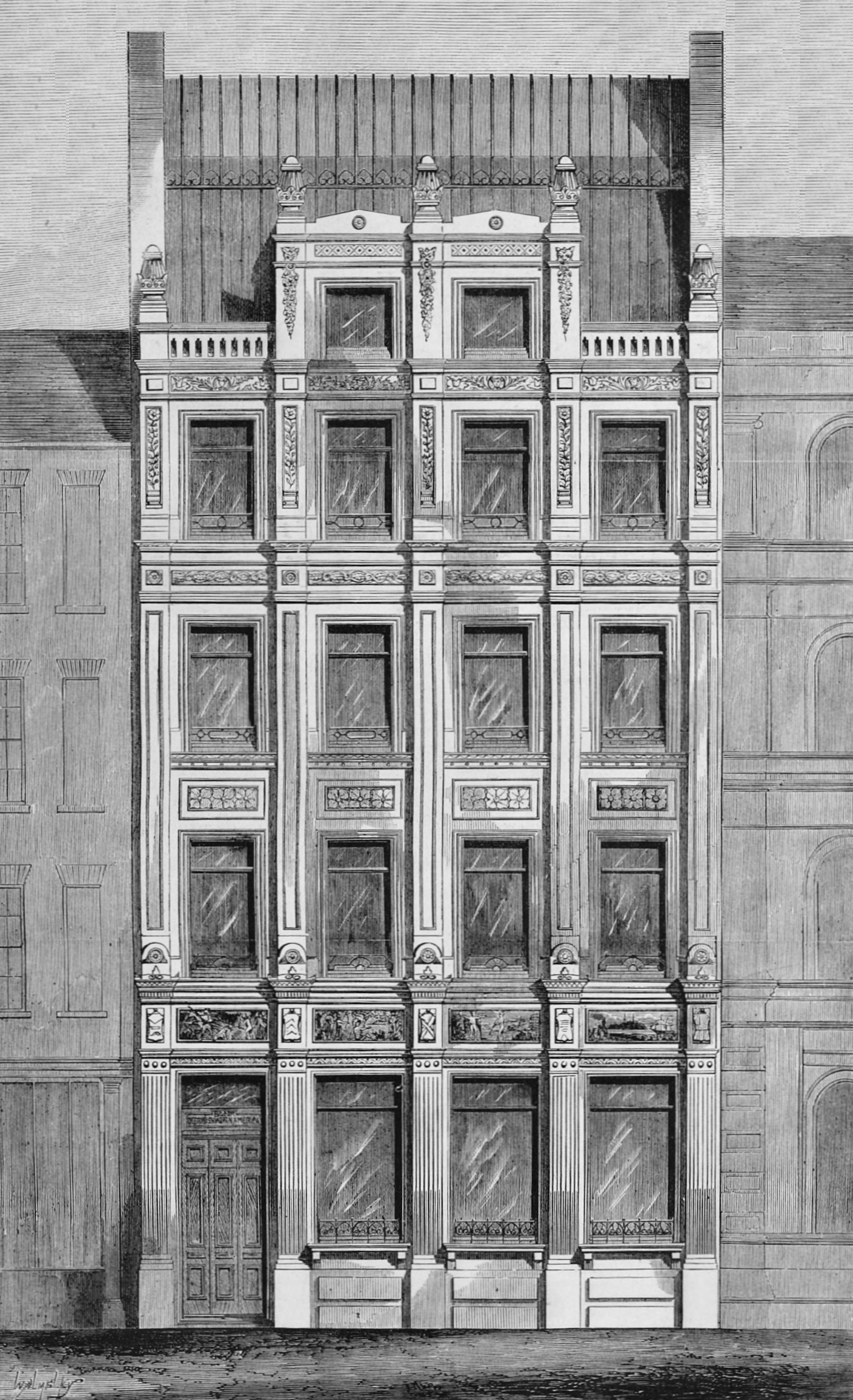
London, England (Clements Lane)

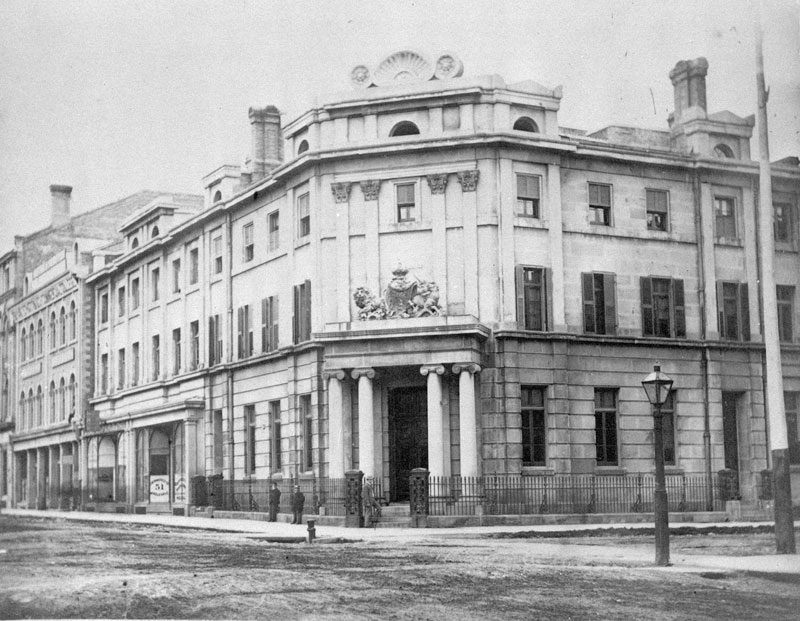
Toronto (Yonge & Wellington, first)

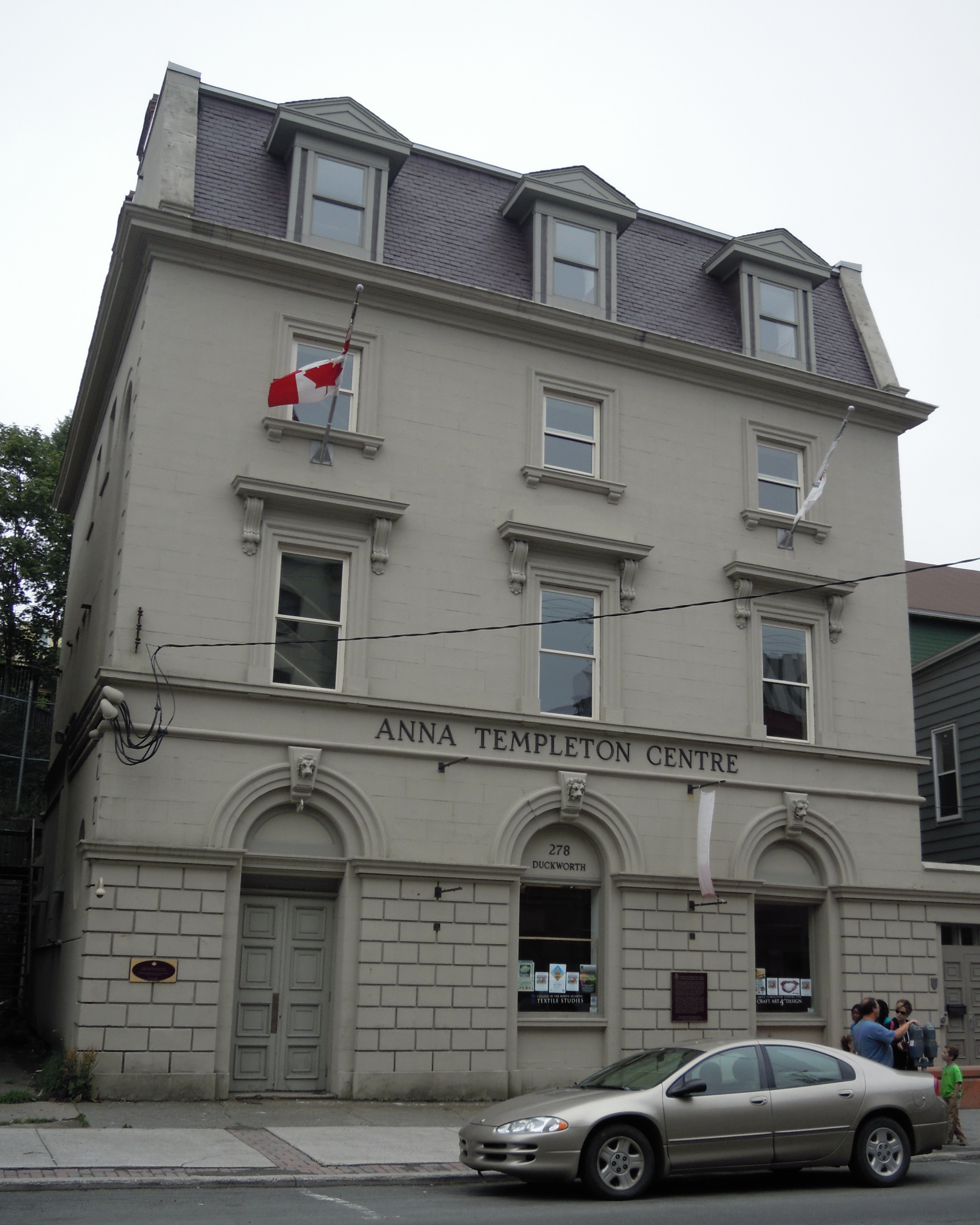
St. John's

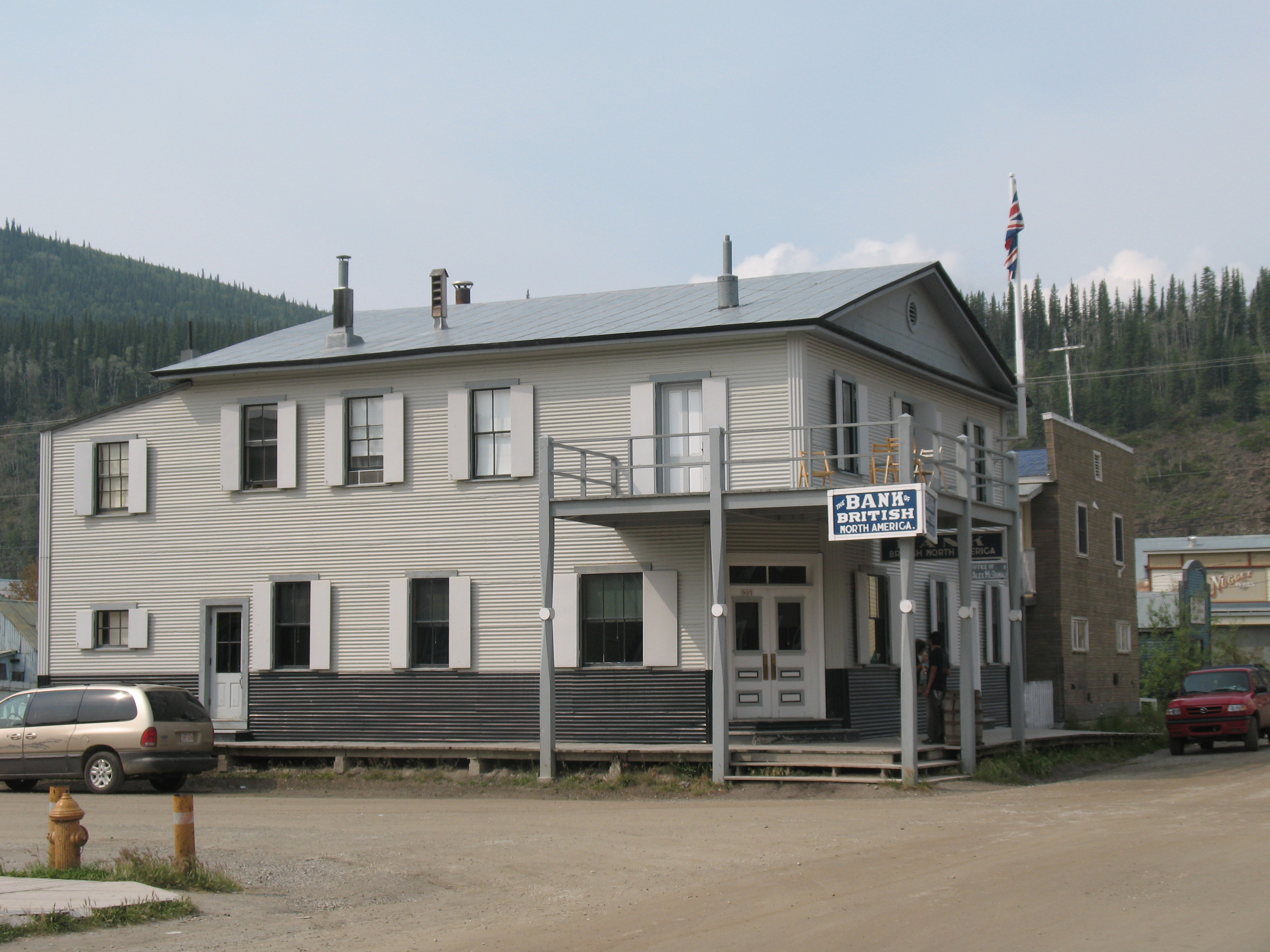
Dawson City

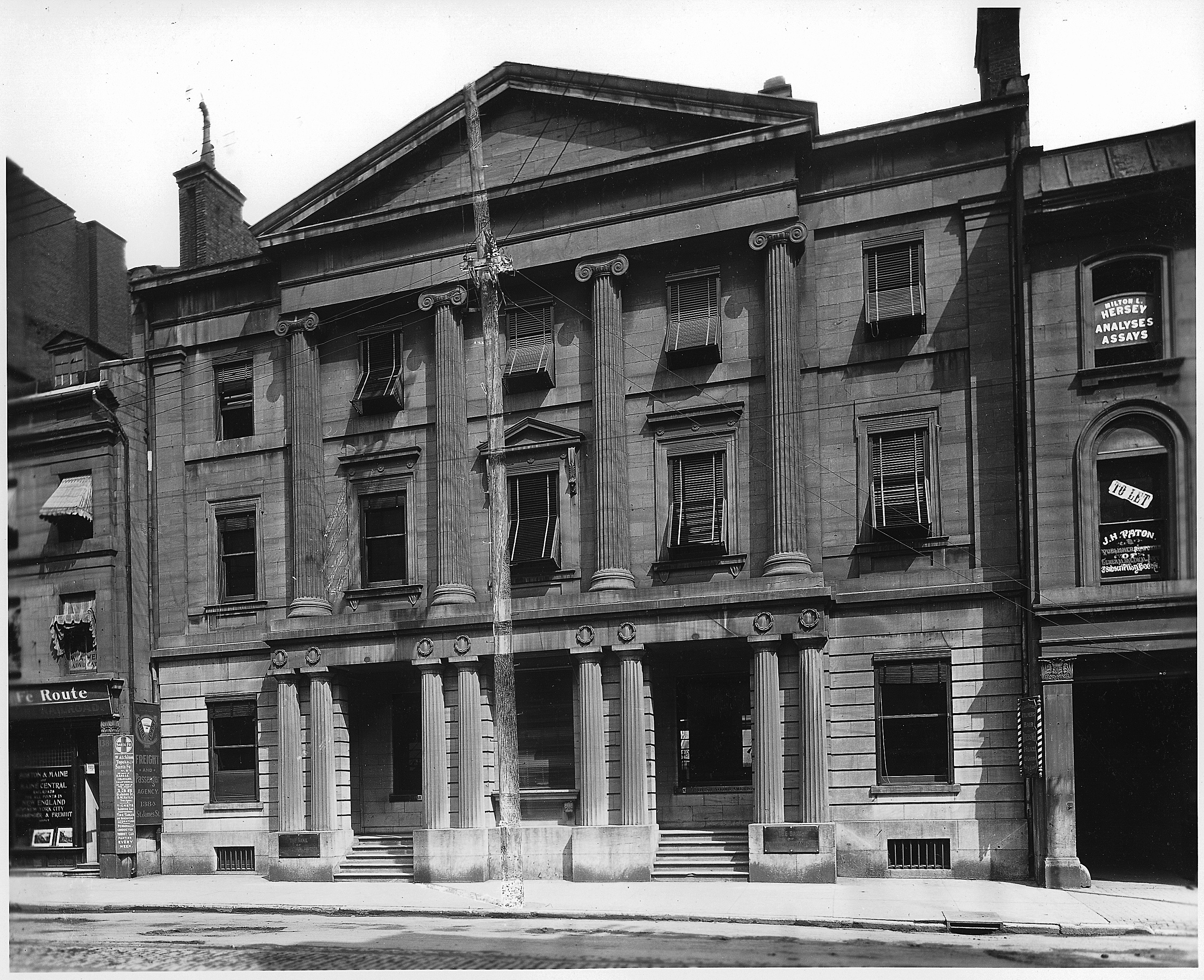
Montreal (first)

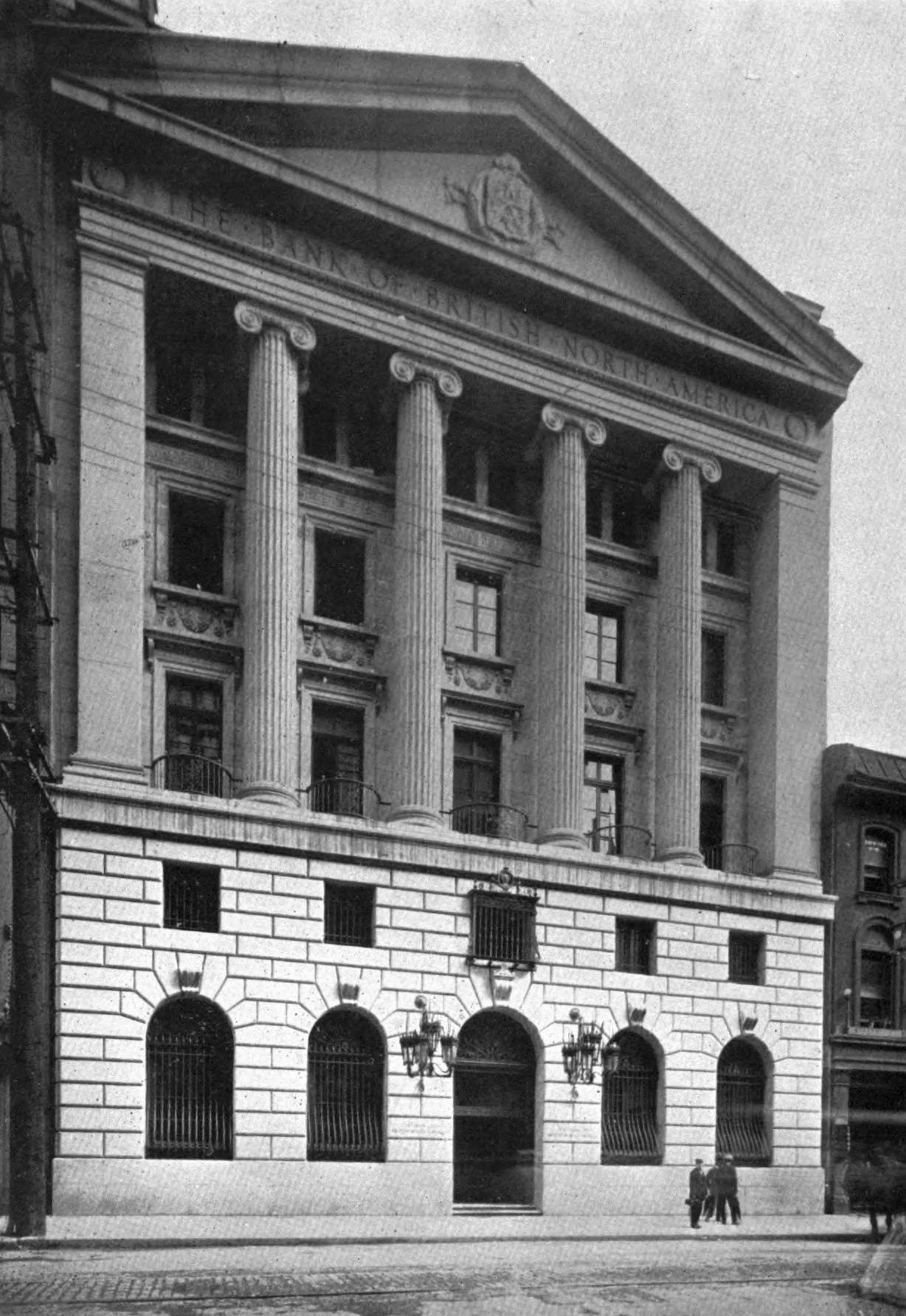
Montreal (second)

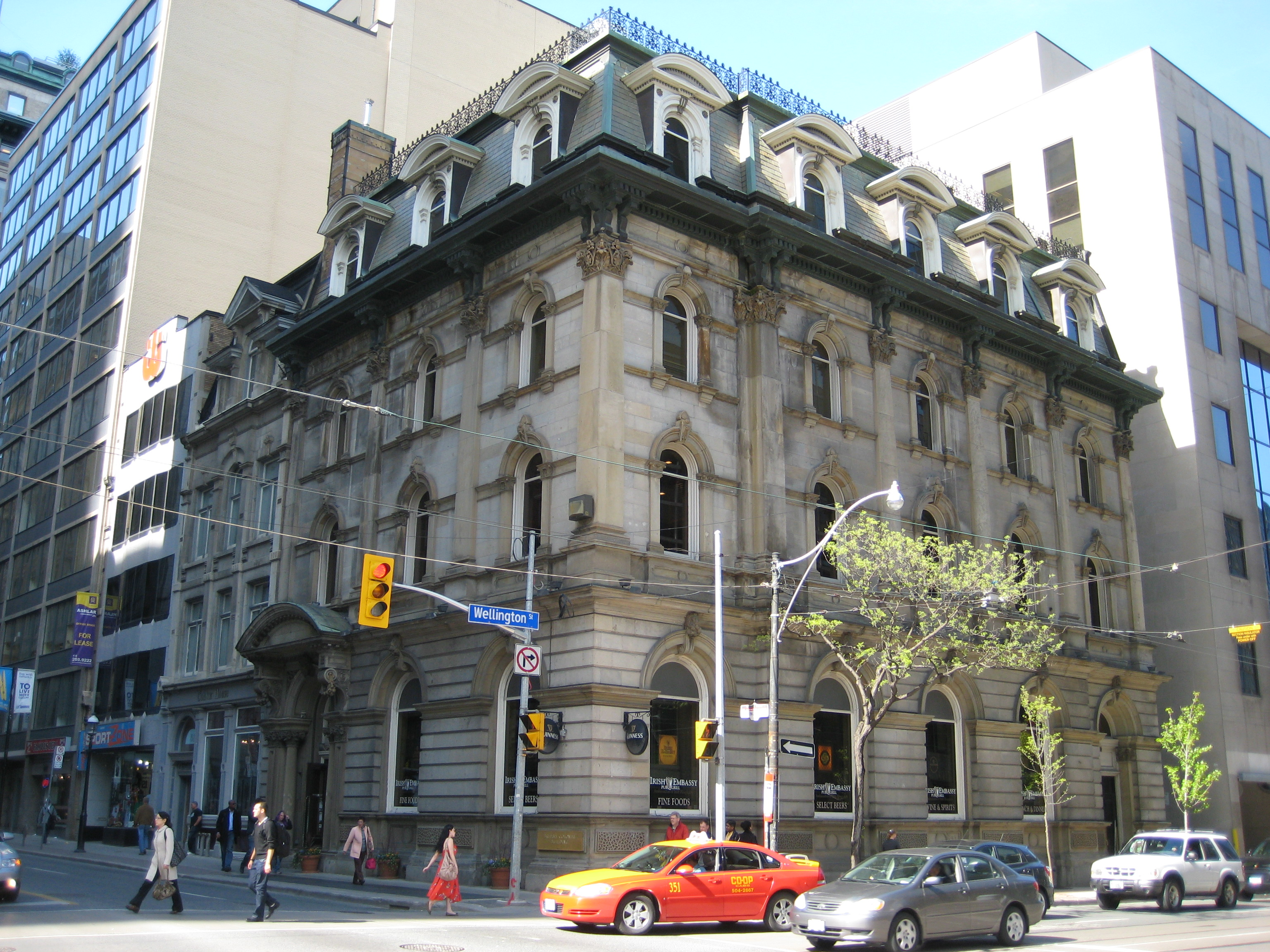
Toronto (Yonge & Wellington, second)

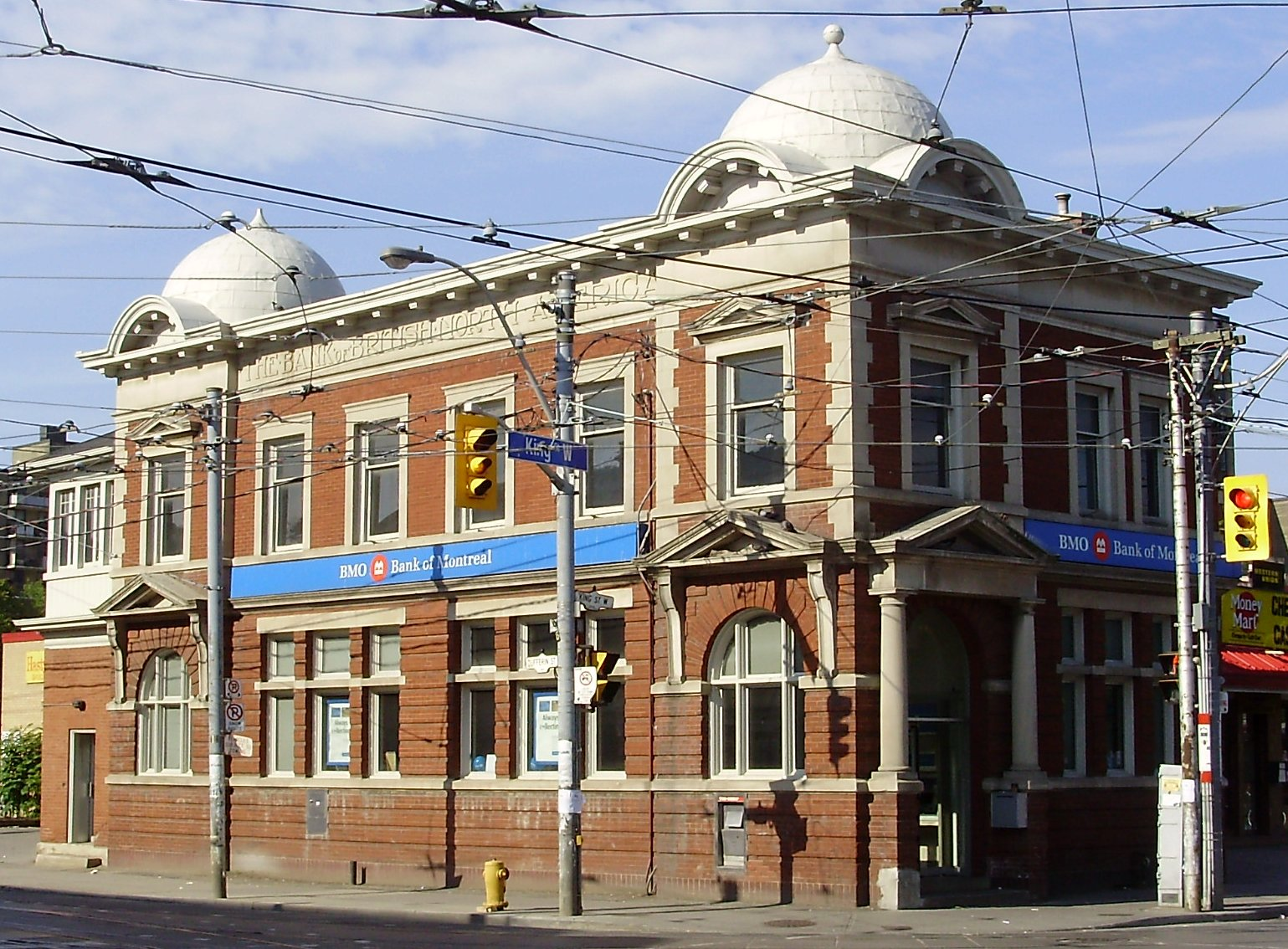
Toronto (King & Dufferin)

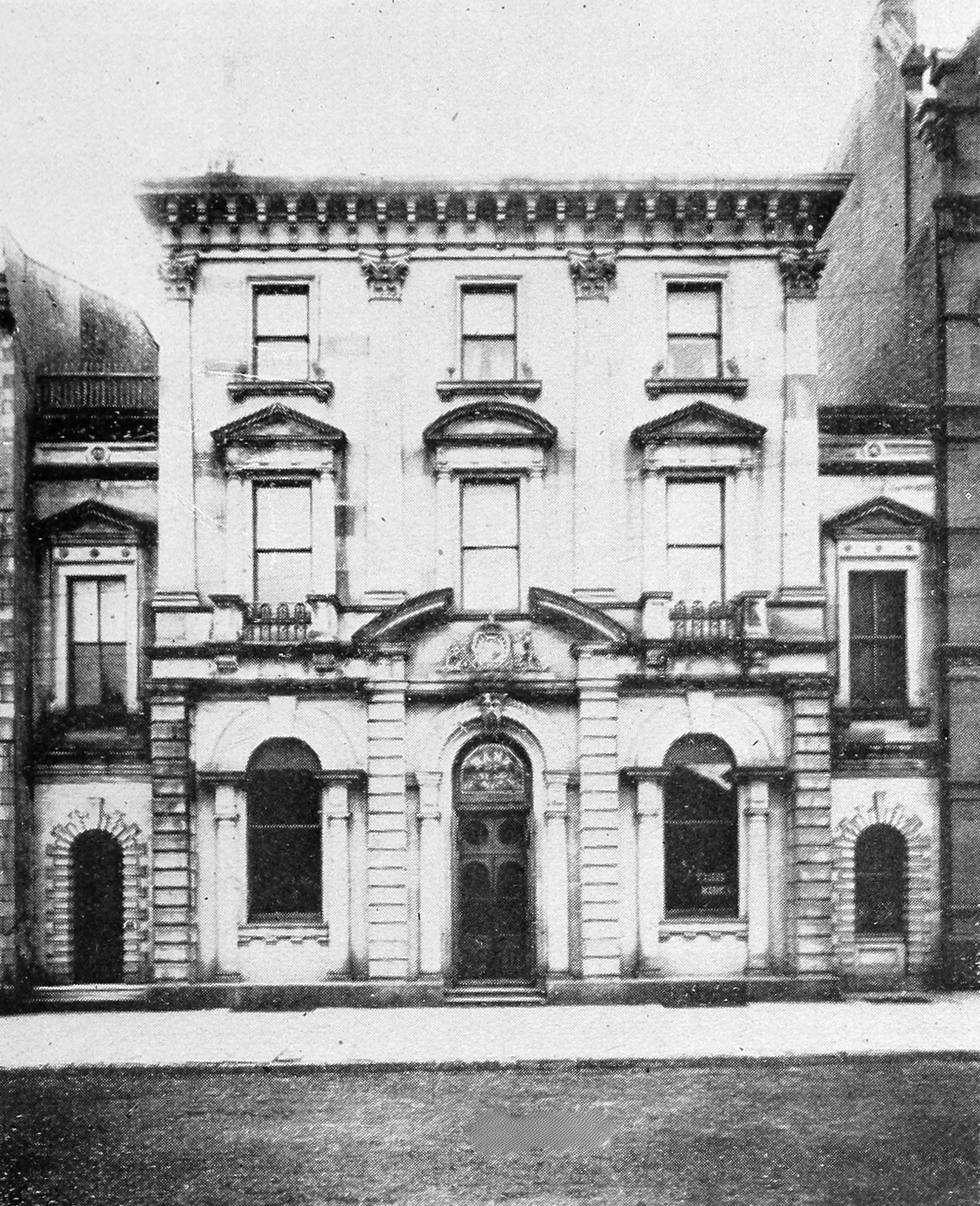
Hamilton

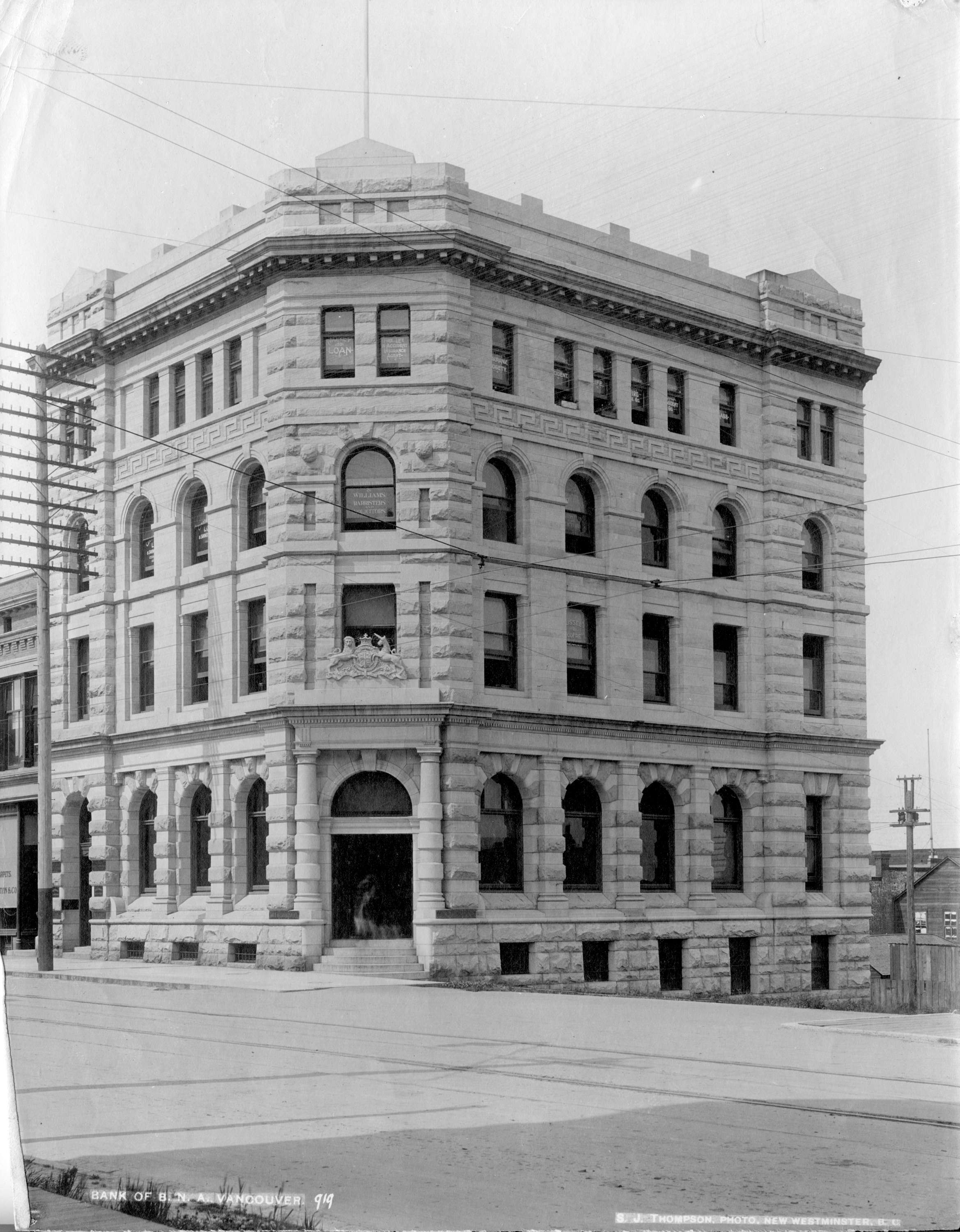
Vancouver

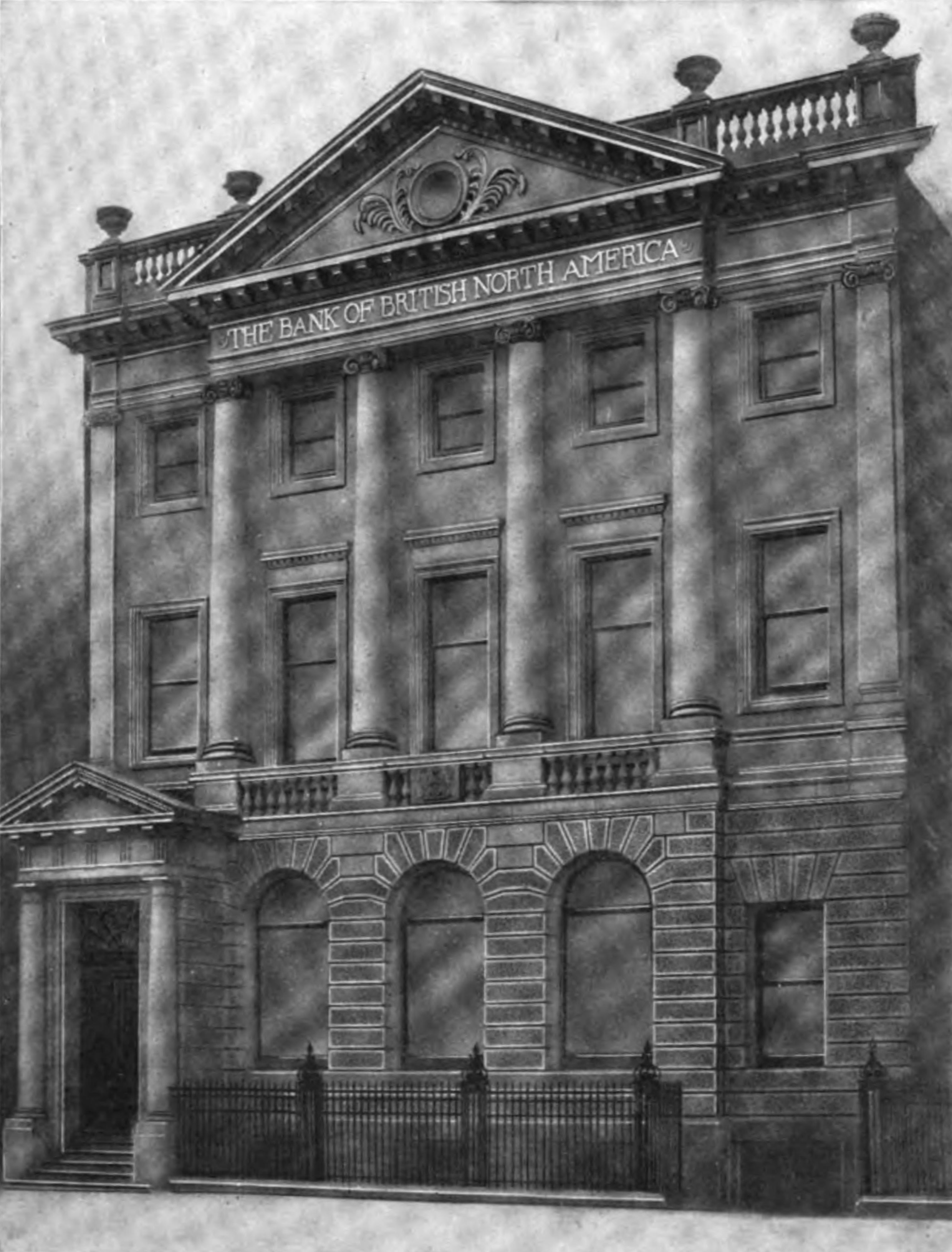
Winnipeg

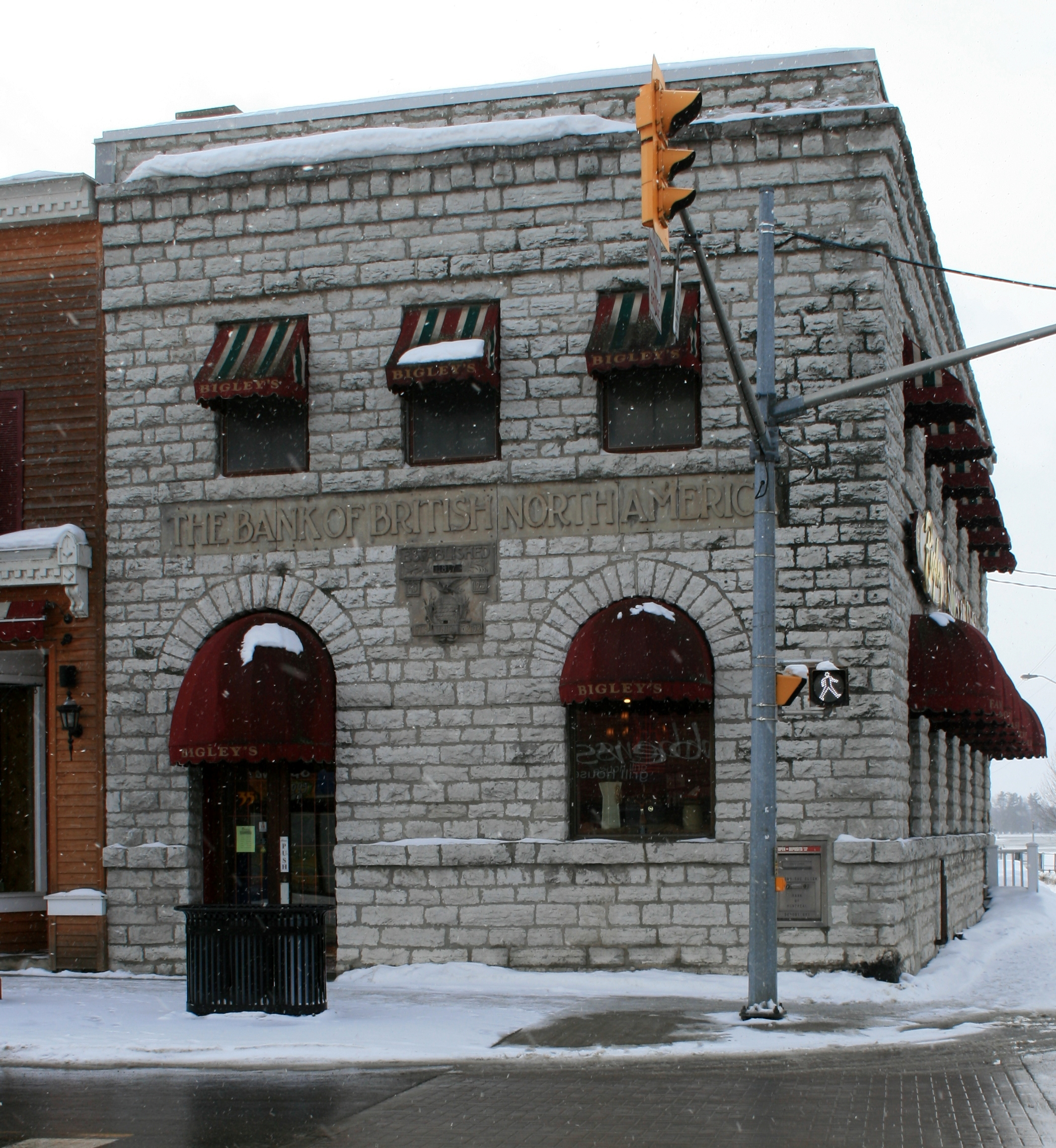
Bobcaygeon

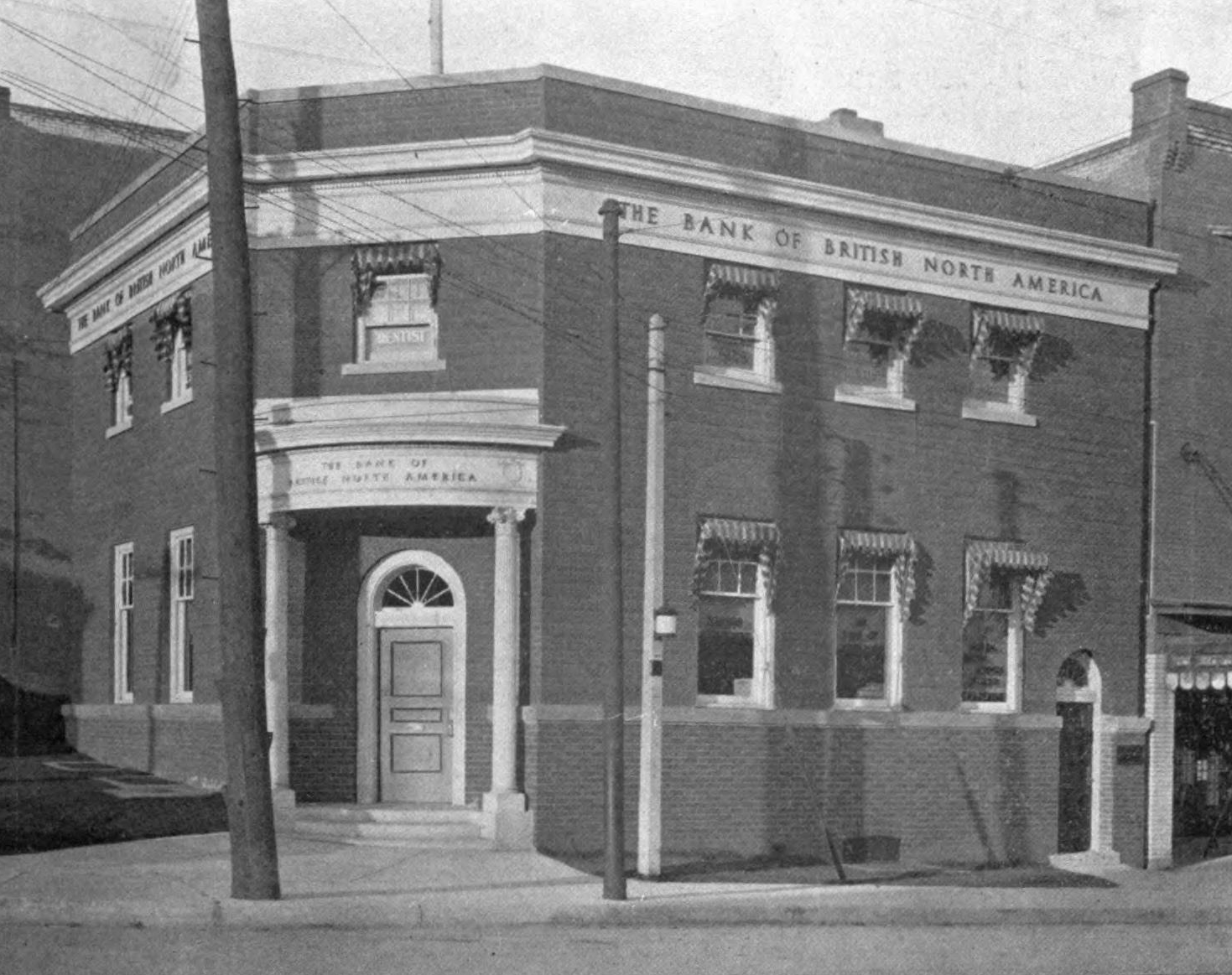
Toronto (Queen & Beech)

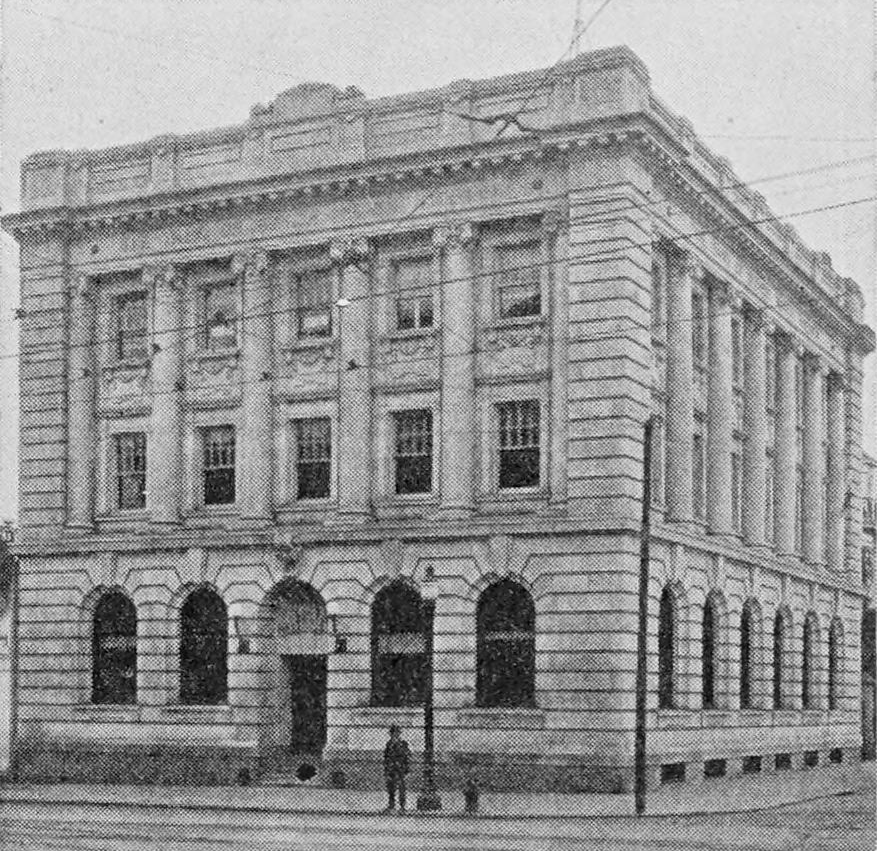
Edmonton

== See also ==
- Bank of British North America Building
- List of banks and credit unions in Canada
- Canadian chartered bank notes
