= Cathedral of St. John the Baptist (St. John's) =

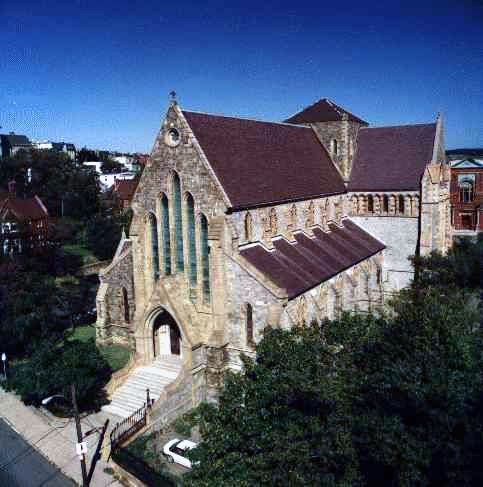
- Cathedral of St. John the Baptist
- 47.5655°N 52.7082°W
- Address: 16 Church Hill, St. John's, Newfoundland and Labrador
- Country: Canada
- Denomination: Anglican
- Churchmanship: Central churchmanship
- Website: ourcathedral.ca

History
- Status: Cathedral
- Founded: 1847
- Founder: Edward Feild
- Dedication: John the Baptist
- Events: Great Fire of 1892

Architecture
- Functional status: Active
- Architects: George Gilbert Scott (1847); William Hay (1885); George Henderson (1885)
- Architectural type: Cathedral
- Style: Gothic Revival
- Years built: 1847 – 1885 burned and restored in 1905
- Completed: 1885

Specifications
- Length: 200 feet (61 m)
- Height: 80 feet (24 m)

Administration
- Diocese: Eastern Newfoundland and Labrador
- Parish: Cathedral Parish of St John's

Clergy
- Bishop: Samuel Rose
- Dean: Roger Whalen

National Historic Site of Canada
- Official name: St. John the Baptist Anglican Cathedral National Historic Site of Canada
- Designated: 1979

The Cathedral of St. John the Baptist is an Anglican cathedral located in the city of St. John's, Newfoundland and Labrador, Canada. The church is considered to be the mother church for Anglicans in Newfoundland and Labrador.

The cathedral is the seat for the Bishops of Eastern Newfoundland and Labrador, Sam Rose, since 2020.

The Anglican parish in the Diocese of Eastern Newfoundland and Labrador was founded in 1699 in response to a petition drafted by the Anglican townsfolk of St. John's and sent to Henry Compton, Bishop of London. In this petition, the people also requested help in the rebuilding of their church, which had been destroyed, along with the rest of the city, in 1696 by the French under the command of Pierre Le Moyne d'Iberville.

During the centuries, at least six wooden churches stood on or near this site; each was destroyed by military operations during the various wars between the French and the British. The British finally won control of eastern North America. As of 2019, this Parish allows clergy to officiate same-sex marriages.

== History ==
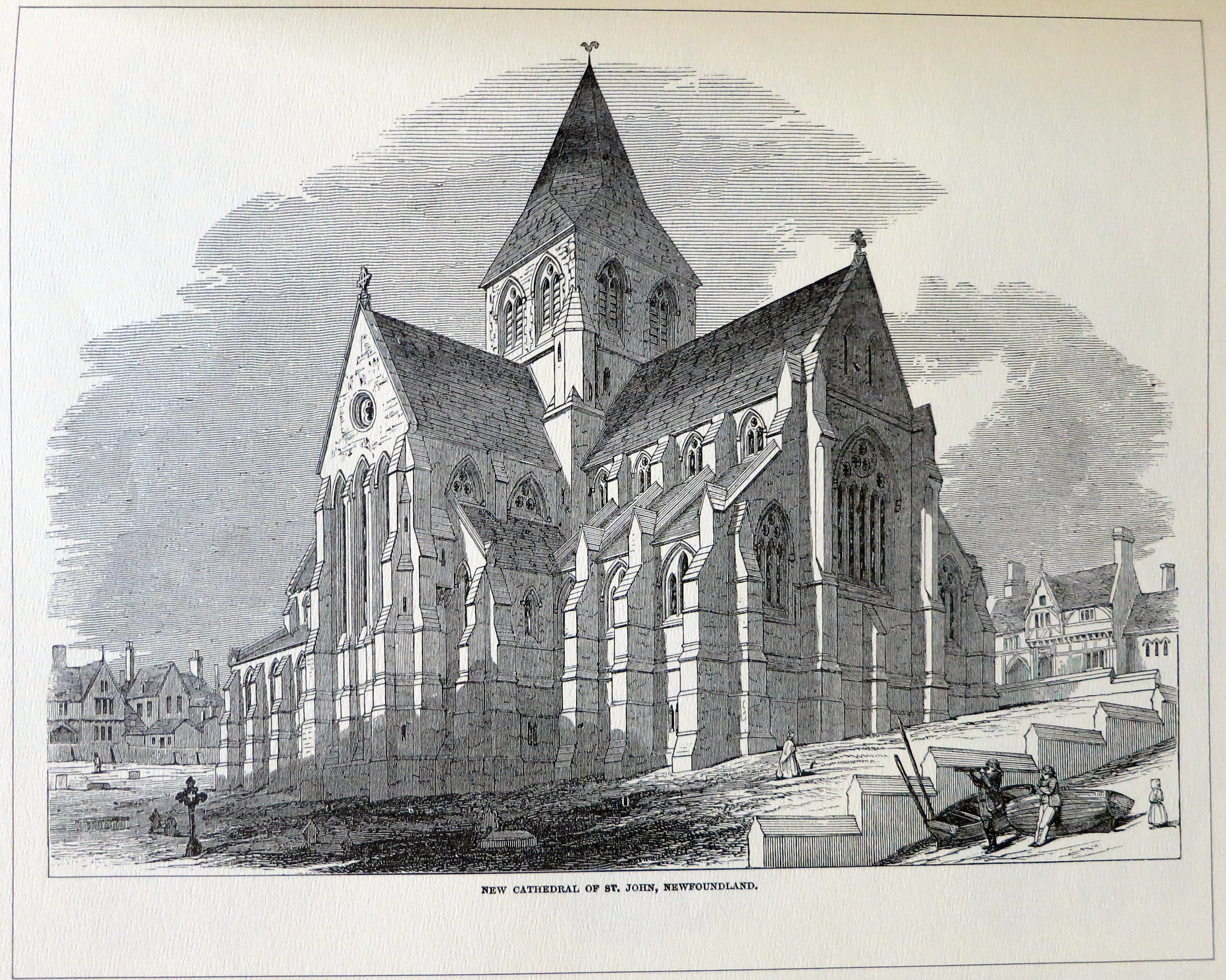
Exterior of the cathedral, 1871

Construction of the first stone church was begun in 1843 under the direction of Aubrey Spencer, the first Bishop of Newfoundland and Bermuda. Little progress was made on this relatively modest edifice beyond the laying of a cornerstone before Spencer resigned due to ill health. The stone church was destroyed in the Great Fire of 1846.

The present cathedral was begun in 1847 by Edward Feild, the second Bishop of Newfoundland and Bermuda. Feild commissioned plans from a leading Gothic Revival architect, George Gilbert Scott, who envisioned a more impressive cruciform structure, with varied ornamentation in the 12th-century English style. The nave, built between 1847 and 1850, served as the entire cathedral church for 35 years. Scott's assistant, architect William Hay, oversaw the nave's construction. In the City of Hamilton, in Pembroke Parish (where St. John's Church was already the parish church), Bermuda, a chapel-of-ease (designed by James Cranston of Oxford in 1844 and completed in 1869) named Trinity Church was also erected, with an adjacent Bishop's Lodge. This was destroyed by arson in 1884 and William Hay, who had been consulted on the construction of Trinity Church in 1848-1849 and again in 1862, was hired in 1885 with his partner, George Henderson, to design the current structure, which was completed in 1905 and became the Cathedral of the Most Holy Trinity when the Bishop of Bermuda was established as separate from the Bishop of Newfoundland in 1919).

Construction on the choir and transept section did not commence until 1880 and was completed in September 1885, under the direction of Bishop James Kelly. The additions to the nave gave the cathedral the shape of a Latin cross. It continued the era of Gothic Revival architecture in the construction of nineteenth-century Anglican churches in Newfoundland.

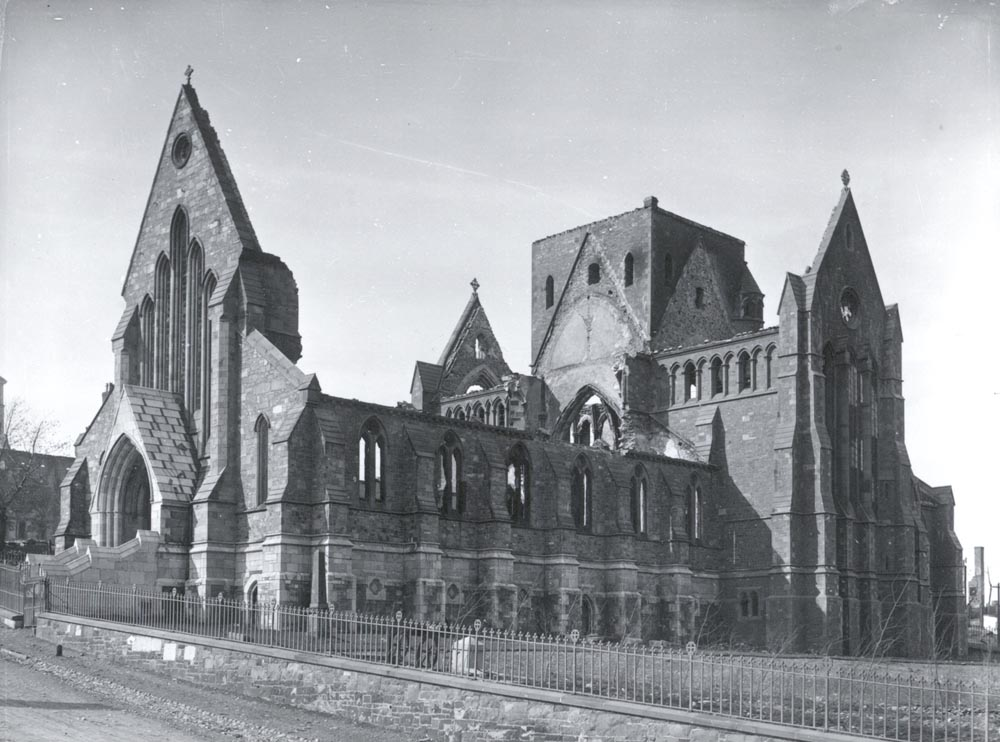
The cathedral after the Great Fire of 1892. The building was not completely restored until 1905.

On July 8, 1892, in an unhappy coincidence to the fate of its chapel-of-ease in Bermuda, the cathedral was extensively damaged in the Great Fire of 1892. The roof timbers ignited, which caused the roof to collapse, bringing the clerestory walls and piers in the nave down with it. The intense heat caused the lead to melt in the glass windows, resulting in the complete destruction of all but two; the sole surviving window can be seen in the Sacristy. Restoration of the Cathedral commenced in 1893, again under Kelly's direction. By 1895, the Chancel and Transepts had been rebuilt, while the Nave reached completion in 1905. The restored cathedral is renowned internationally as one of North America's best ecclesiastical Gothic Revival structures. The church was re-consecrated in a service on September 21, 1905. A window in the restored Cathedral was dedicated to Kelly, who died in 1907.

In 1923 the Congolese-English sculptor Mahomet Thomas Phillips, and his son Lancelot, completed a reredos for the cathedral that took them 2,779 hours to create.

The Te Deum Window was donated in 1952 in memory of Bermudian-born Sir Joseph Outerbridge by his family. A large four-manual organ was constructed by Casavant Frères in 1927.

The Cathedral remains incomplete as the structure still lacks the spire which its designer, Scott, had envisioned. Although an engineering team has established that the proposed 150-foot (46 m) tower and steeple is structurally feasible, the cost was estimated to be $3,000,000. The people of the Cathedral Parish have no plans to add the spire.

The cathedral was designated a National Historic Site of Canada in 1979 as a nationally significant example of Gothic Revival architecture. The building was also designated as a Registered Heritage Structure by the Heritage Foundation of Newfoundland and Labrador in 1991, and a City of St. John's Heritage Building in 1989.

== Design ==
The Cathedral stretches 200 feet (61 m) from the Great West Doors to the Sanctuary, with a 60-foot (18 m)-wide nave and a maximum width of 99 feet (30 m) at the transepts. Where nave and transept cross, the floor-to-ceiling height is 57 feet (17 m); outside, the roof stands 80 feet (24 m) high at the ridge.

== See also ==
- Architecture of St. John's
- Diocese of Eastern Newfoundland and Labrador
