= St. John's Hindu Temple =

- Location in Newfoundland and Labrador

Religion
- Affiliation: Hinduism
- Province: Newfoundland and Labrador
- Deity: Krishna

Location
- Location: 26 Penney Lane; St. John's, Newfoundland and Labrador, Canada; A1A 5H2
- Country: Canada
- Interactive map of St. John's Hindu Temple
- Coordinates: 47.603588°N 52.72046°W

Architecture
- Creator: Swami Chinmayananda
- Completed: 1995

Website
- https://sites.google.com/site/hindutemplestjohns/

The St. John's Hindu Temple is located in St. John's, Newfoundland and Labrador, Canada. In 1975, Hindus established a Hindu temple in Mount Pearl. Swami Chinmayananda donated a marble statue of Krishna, which was installed by Swami Dayananda. The temple functioned as an independent organization with the name Chinmaya Mission St. John's.

In 1995, a new temple was constructed in the east end of St. John's where most Hindus live, and subsequently it was renamed Hindu Temple St. John's Association.

All major Hindu festivals are celebrated in this temple. The temple participates in several local ethno-cultural and community projects and events. Children perform a weekly puja on Sunday mornings, and the temple is regularly visited by other groups of school children.

== Main deity at the Temple ==
- Krishna

== Festivals celebrated during the year ==
- Navratri - Golu, Garba and Durga Pooja
- Diwali
- Maha Shivaratri
- Ganesh Chathurthi
- Makar Sankranti Pongal
- Holi
- Krishna Janmashtami
- Onam
- New Year festivities in April, Ramanavami

== See also ==
- Architecture of St. John's
- World Hinduism
- Hindu calendar
- List of Hindu temples
- Hindu scriptures
