= 351 (building) =

Coordinates: 47°33′36″N 52°42′40″W

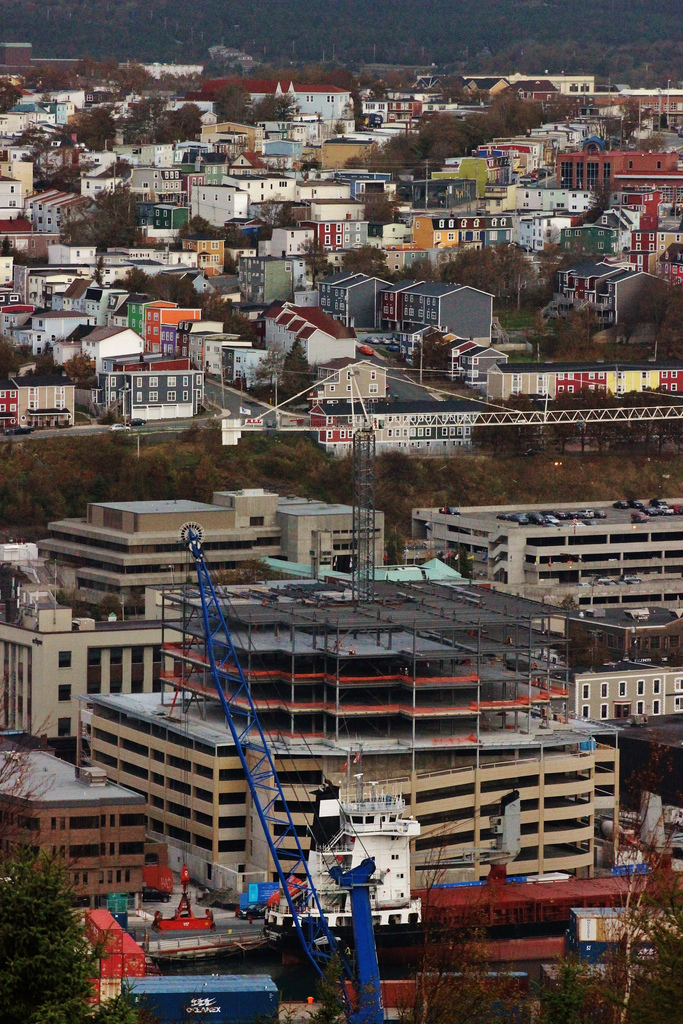
- 351 construction site in October 2012

General information
- Status: Completed
- Type: Office, retail, parking
- Location: St. John's, Newfoundland and Labrador, 351 Water Street
- Groundbreaking: October 27, 2011
- Completed: 2013
- Opened: 2013
- Cost: $50 million
- Owner: East Port Properties

Height
- Height: 46.6 m (153 ft)

Technical details
- Floor count: 12
- Floor area: 14,999 square metres

Design and construction
- Architecture firm: PHB Group

Website
- threefiftyone.ca

351 (stylized III fifty one) is a 165,000-square-foot office building. The high-rise is in downtown St. John's, Newfoundland and Labrador, at 351 Water Street. The office building is the first to be constructed downtown in 25 years and was completed in 2013 by East Port Properties.

The building consists of a parking garage spanning the bottom six floors (labelled floors 0 through 5) beneath an office tower on the top six floors (6 through 11), The current anchor tenant of 351 is Cenovus Energy, who occupy offices on five of the six commercial storeys. Subsea 7 also maintains offices in the building.

== Background ==
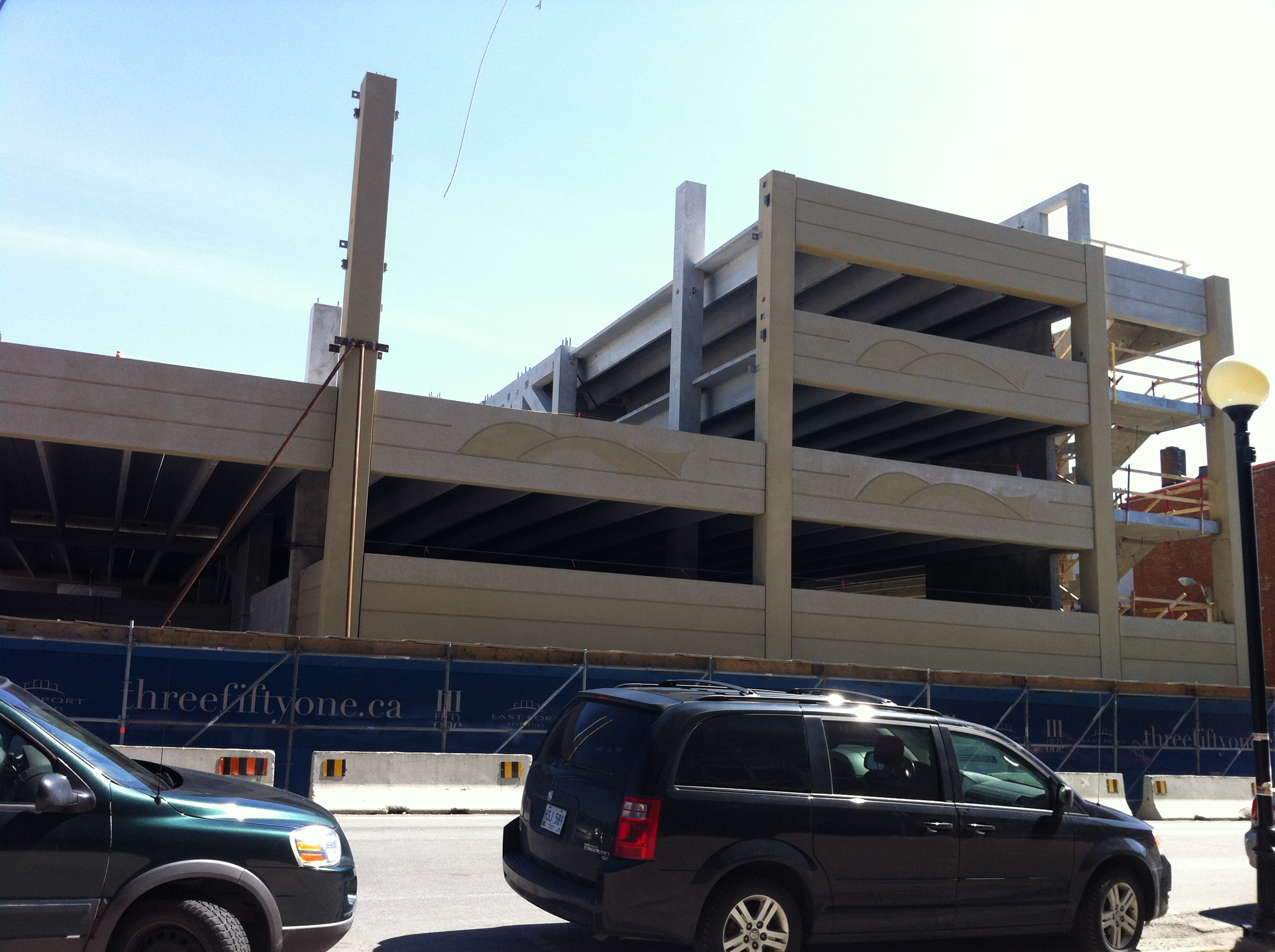
Construction site in April 2012

The site of 351 was originally part of St. John's Harbour, and is on made ground that is made up of fill coming from the rubble left after major fires in the 1800s. The location is most known for being the location of a F. W. Woolworth Company department store. When the store opened in 1952 it was considered to be the most modern store in St. John's, featuring a 2-storey escalator, an American-style soda fountain a hotdog machine and a popcorn machine. In the early 1990s the department store closed, a discount department store operated in the building for a few years before it was left vacant.

In February 2010, East Port Properties announced a proposal to construct a 12-storey office tower and parking garage at the site. In October 2011, the St. John's City Council removed the site from the heritage area, leading to the approval of the development. Construction of the site started in the Summer of 2011, and the official ground breaking was held on October 27, 2011. It will also be the first building in the province to use deep water source cooling.

The parking garage within 351 opened in 2013; possibly uniquely among St. John's buildings, it includes charging stations for electric cars.

== See also ==
- List of tallest buildings in St. John's, Newfoundland and Labrador
- Architecture of St. John's
- Downtown St. John's
