= Bank of British North America Building =

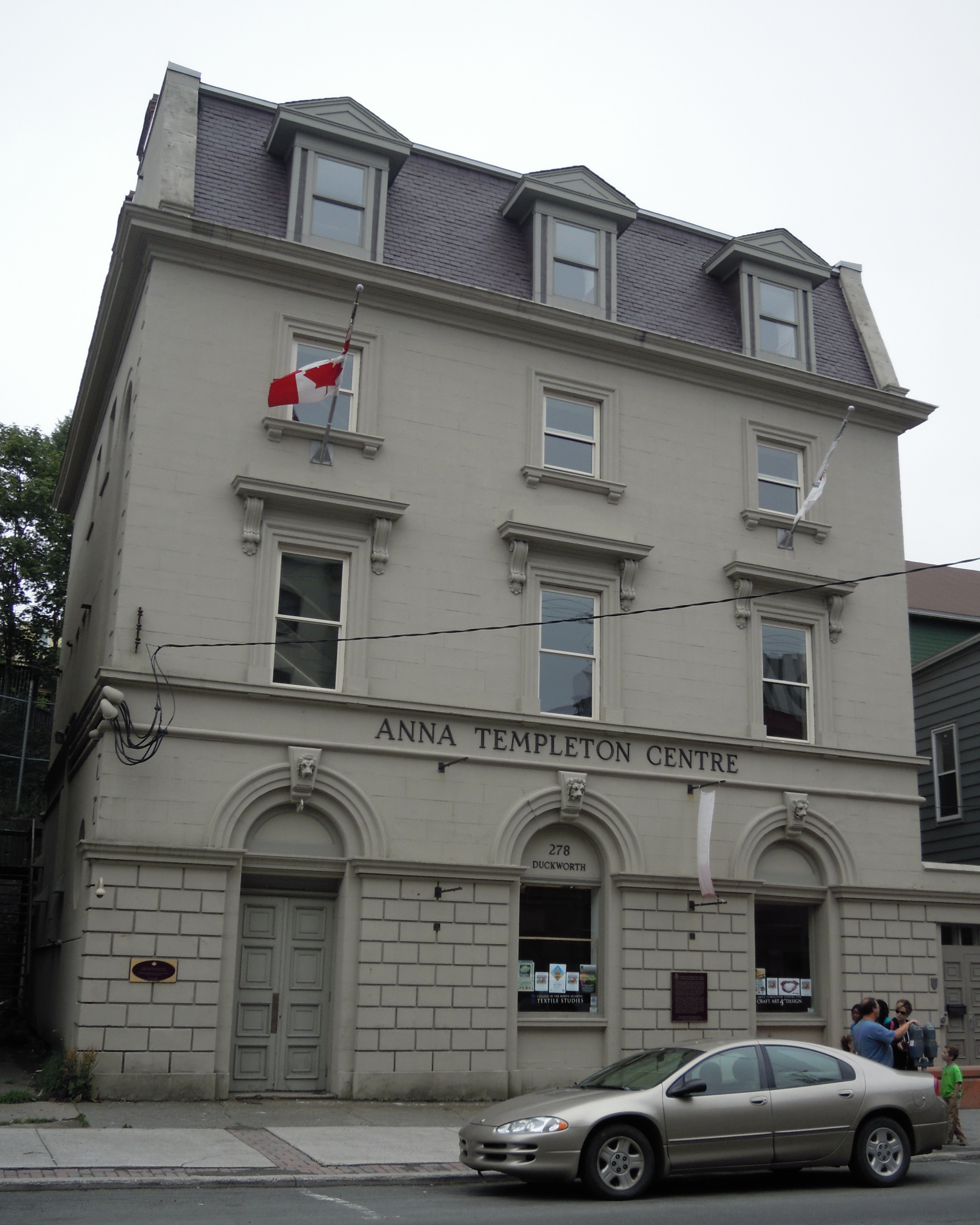

- Location within Newfoundland
- 47°33′56.76″N 52°42′24.17″W
- Location: St. John's, Newfoundland and Labrador

History
- Founded: 1849

Site notes
- Area: 7,653.45 km^{2} (2,955.01 sq mi)
- Governing body: College of the North Atlantic

National Historic Site of Canada
- Official name: Former Bank of British North America National Historic Site of Canada
- Designated: 1990

The Bank of British North America Building built in the Italianate style was constructed in 1849 for the British Bank of North America, Newfoundland's first commercial bank. The building was built after the St. John's fire of 1846 by Halifax architect David Stirling.

The British Bank of North America was formed in 1835 and opened its first colonial branch in Newfoundland in 1837, with other branches soon to follow in New Brunswick, Nova Scotia, British Columbia, Yukon and in California. From 1857 to 1894 the building was acquired by the Commercial Bank of Newfoundland and had replaced the original hipped roof with a mansard roof. In 1892 it sustained more fire damage in the fire of 1892, it was of the few structures that survived the devastation. It was reconstructed by William Howe Greene, who had also built the Supreme Court House and Cabot Tower.

In 1895 the Bank of Montreal moved into the building and two years later, the only Newfoundland bank to survive the 1894 Crash, the Newfoundland Savings Bank, moved into the building. Then again in 1962 the Bank of Montreal purchased the Savings Bank and reacquired the building. In 1985 the Bank of Montreal donated the building to the City of St. John's. This style later became popular in Canada. Newfoundland’s first commercial bank from 1849-1857. In the following century the building housed a few other banks. From 1857 to 1894 The Banks of Newfoundland, then from 1895 for two years Bank of Montreal and Newfoundland Savings Bank from 1697 to 1962 and Bank of Montreal again from 1962 to 1985.

At present the building is home to the College of the North Atlantic's Anna Templeton Centre established as a non-profit crafts and arts training and education centre.

The building was designated a National Historic Site of Canada in 1990. The Heritage Foundation of Newfoundland and Labrador designated the site a Registered Heritage Structure on May 3, 1991.
