= George Street United Church =

Defunct church built in 1873

Coordinates: 47.5580°N 52.7132°W

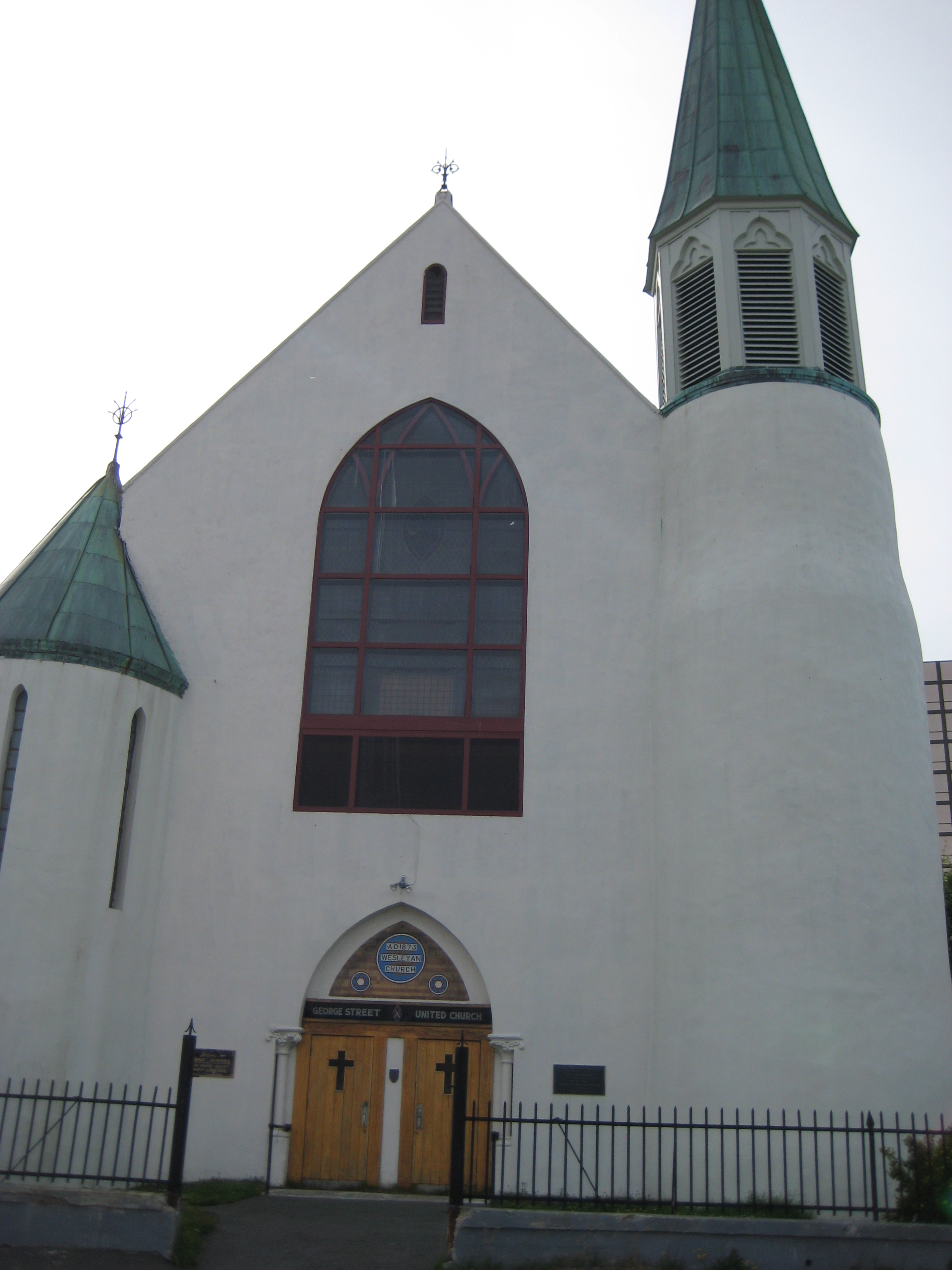
Front Exterior of George Street United

George Street United Church is a defunct church that was built in 1873 and was the oldest extant Methodist church building in St. John’s, Newfoundland and Labrador. Designed by Elijah Hoole, it was an example of a modified Gothic Revival church. In August 2023, church leadership announced that the congregation had disbanded in June due to financial difficulties. Plans are currently underway for a final service to mark the official closure of the church in October 2023.

On February 11, 1862, the Reverend Edmund Botterell, the Hon. J.J. Rogerson and the Hon. Captain Edward White were appointed to a committee by the St. John's District of the Methodist Church to select a site for a new church and Sunday school in what was then the west end of St. John’s. The laying of the cornerstone of the George Street Methodist Church occurred ten years later. George Street was the second Methodist congregation in St. John's, the first being Gower Street. The church building survived the Great Fire of 1892, and is therefore the oldest Methodist Church in the city. In 1925, the George Street Wesleyan Church joined the newly-formed United Church of Canada.

Constructed of local stone quarried from the Southside Hills in St. John's, the entire building is sheathed in concrete. Despite this, many typical Gothic elements remain intact including the pointed arch, lancet windows, and the large stained glass windows. Furthermore, the interior of this church is architecturally valuable for its well-preserved woodwork. The exposed timber hammerbeam roof of the nave is a typical Gothic element.

The church was designated as a Heritage Structure in 2000 due to its architectural and historical value.

The city's oldest Methodist church congregation and the first Methodist church building (1815) was Gower Street Methodist (now United) church, later destroyed by fire; its current structure was also designed by Elijah Hoole.
