= St. Patrick's Church, St. John's =

Coordinates: 47°33′13.06″N 52°43′00.55″W

Saint Patrick's Church is a former Roman Catholic church in St. John's, Newfoundland, Canada. St. Patrick's Church closed in 2022.

== History ==
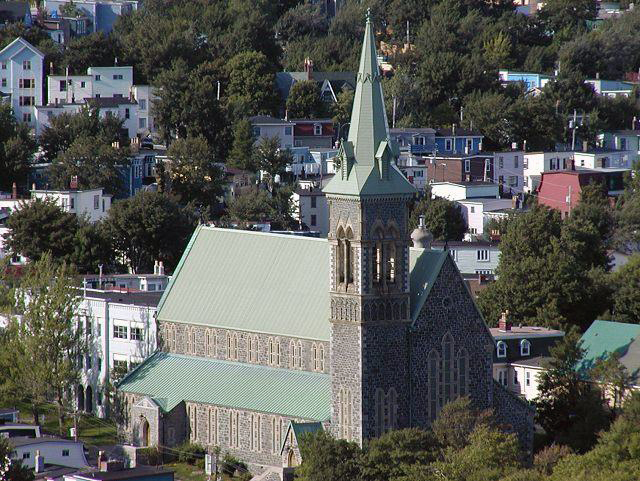
St. Patrick's Church

The cornerstone of St. Patrick's Church was laid on September 17, 1855, by Bishop John T. Mullock and other distinguished clergy from Canada and the United States. American financier, Cyrus Field, contributed £1,000($107,123.88 in USD 2019) to help with construction costs. The church was designed in the late Gothic Revival, also termed Neo-Gothic, style by J.J. McCarthy, a prominent Irish architect, and was built by T. O'Brien, local architect and mason.

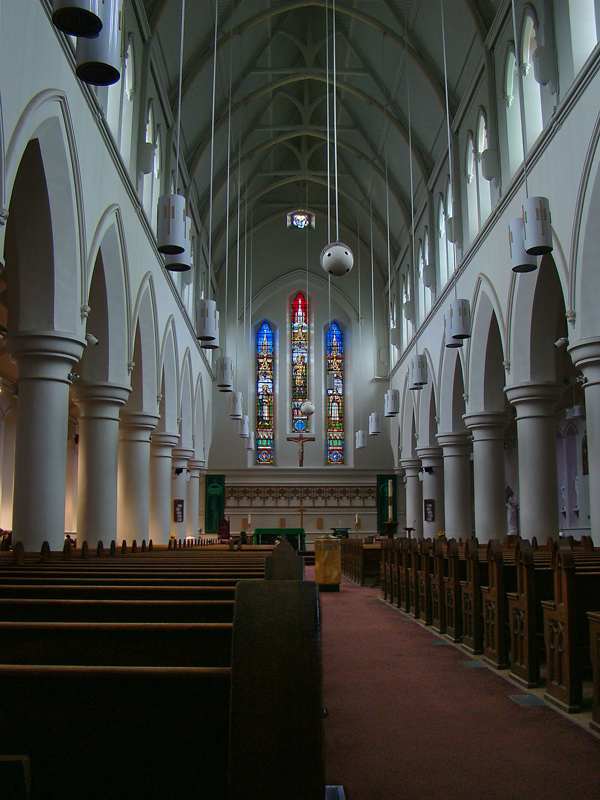
The interior

In 1864 nine years after the cornerstone was laid, work officially began on the structure with the construction the foundation from stone taken from the Southside Hills in St. John's. Further problems prevented work on the project from advancing beyond the 1864 stage for a decade. Additional stone was donated in 1875 and construction began once more. Construction continued as funds and materials permitted and the church was completed in 1881. After more than two-and-a-half decades, St. Patrick's Church was consecrated on August 28, 1881.

The church was designated a National Historic Site of Canada in 1990. In 1997 the Heritage Foundation of Newfoundland and Labrador declared St. Patrick's Church a Registered Heritage Structure. St. Patrick's Church was the tallest building in St. John's from 1888 to 1959 (71 years).

St. Patrick's Church closed in 2022 after being sold as part of the archdiocese liquidating its holdings in an effort to raise money to compensate victims of abuse.
