= Great Fire of 1892 =

Serious fire in St. John's, Newfoundland Colony

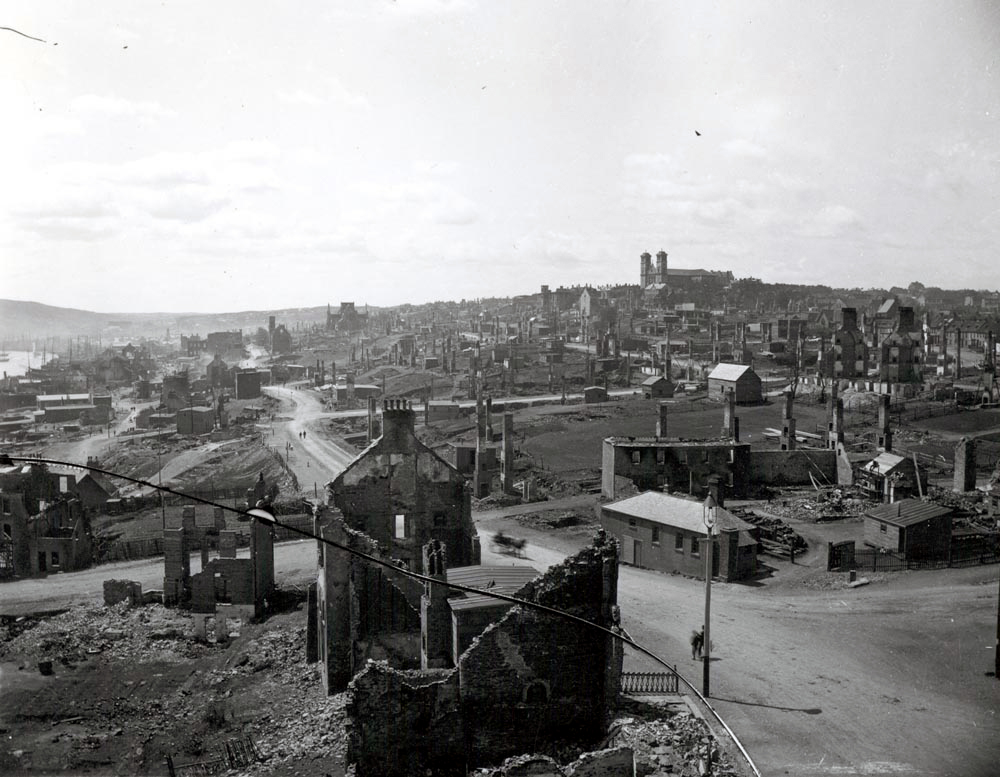
City of St. John's after the great fire of 1892; the double steeples of the Basilica of St. John the Baptist are visible on the far hill

The Great Fire of 8 July 1892 occurred in St. John's, Newfoundland. It is remembered as the worst disaster ever to befall that city. Previous "Great Fires" had occurred in St. John's, during 1816, 1817, 1819, and 1846.

== Timeline ==
At approximately 4:45 in the afternoon of July 8, 1892, a dropped tobacco pipe in Timothy O'Brien's stable, atop Carter's Hill on Freshwater Road, began what would become the worst fire in the history of St. John's. Initially, the fire did not cause any widespread panic; however, a series of catastrophic coincidences caused the fire to spread and devour virtually all of the east end of the city, including much of its major commercial area, before being extinguished.

Rev. Moses Harvey witnessed the initial stages of the fire, and remarked to his friend that it "was a bad day for a fire." A high wind from the northwest was blowing, hurling the sparks far and wide on the roofs of the clusters of wooden houses. For a month previous, hardly any rain had fallen, and the shingled roofs were as dry as tinder." The situation was exacerbated because of work completed earlier in the day on the water mains. Although water flow was re-established by 3 p.m., two hours before the fire began, water pressure was insufficient to force water up into the higher sections of the city where the fire began. W.J. Kent remarked that the "flames therefore made headway before water was procurable and, as a very high westerly wind was furiously fanning the fire, it began to spread rapidly."

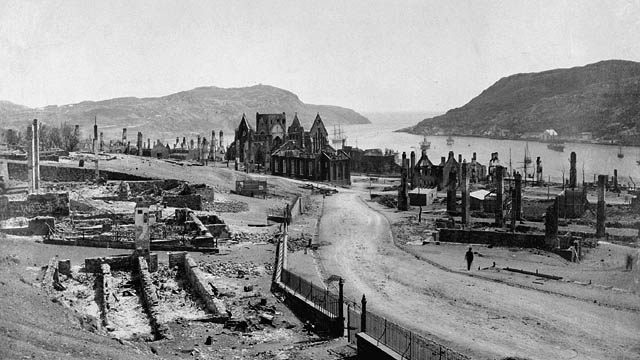
City of St. John's and the St. John the Baptist Cathedral after the fire

An hour into the blaze, the people of St. John's realized that the fire could not be contained in the area of O'Brien's farm. Because locals believed stone walls would withstand the flames, residents moved valuables into numerous stone buildings in the city. One of the most common refuge areas was the Anglican Cathedral of St. John the Baptist. The nave and transepts of the church were filled with valuable property belonging to numerous families, including that of the Anglican bishop Lleweyn Jones. The cathedral and much of this property were also destroyed by the ravenous fire. Kent described the burning of the cathedral as follows:

with one fearful rush the demonic fire seized upon the doomed cathedral, and sooner than tongue could tell the immense edifice, a gem of Gothic architecture, the masterpiece of Sir Gilbert Scott and the pride of every Newfoundlander, was a seething mass of flame. With a crash, heard even above the din of the elements the roof fell in, and the result of the labours and offerings of thousands for many years vanished in a cloud of smoke and dust.

The fire was far from finished; the wind caused offshoots of the main fire to consume new sections of the city while the main fire continued its destructive trek towards the city's commercial centre, Water Street. The businesses that lined Water Street and Duckworth Street were destroyed as the fire spread throughout the downtown area.

Rev. Harvey said,

"The beautiful shops, full of valuable goods; the stores behind, containing thousands of barrels of flour and provisions of all kinds; the fish stores; the wharves, which it had cost immense sums to erect, -- disappeared one by one into the maw of the destroyer...the whole of Water Street, on both sides, was 'swept with the besom of destruction.'"

The fire continued to burn into the night and the early hours of the next morning. Rev. Harvey's description of the restless night said that "the terror-stricken inhabitants flying before the destroyer,… the cries of weeping women hurrying with their children to places of safety -- all constituted a scene which not even the pen of Dante could describe."

Similarly, Kent said of that night,

All the arteries which led from the water to the higher portions of the town were crowded with the terrorised mob and the screams and cries of the women mingled with the wailing of children, the shouts intensified by the ever-freshening masses of livid fire and the glare of the burning buildings, contributed to make a scene the like of which it is not often given to the lot of many to witness.... Few there were who closed their eyes that night.

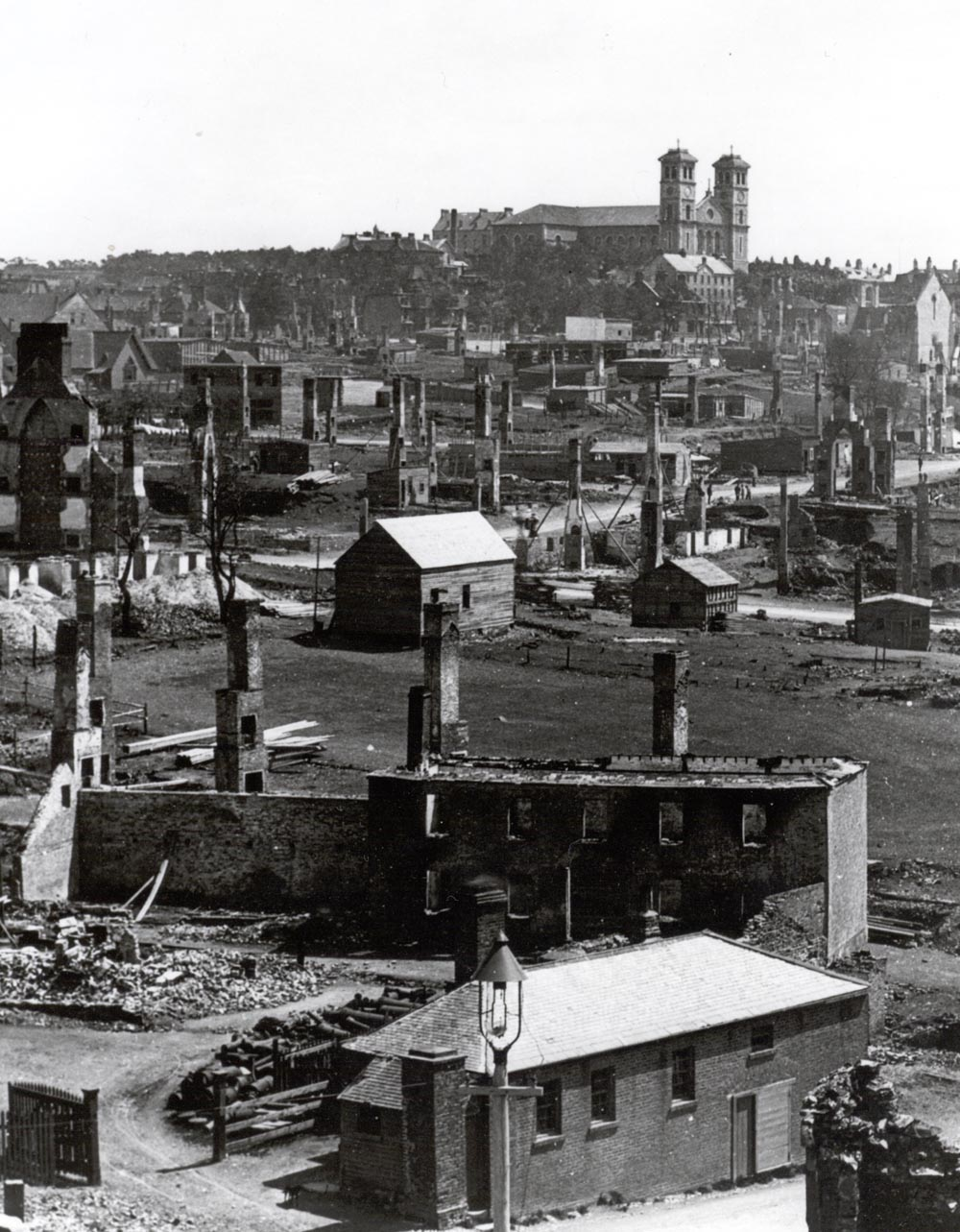
Basilica of St. John the Baptist and St. John's after the Great Fire of 1892

Daybreak on the morning of July 9, 1892 revealed the full extent of the fire's devastation. Kent described the sight of local residents viewing the desolation:

When morning broke the thick clouds of smoke still ascended from the burning ruins, and it was hours before it had cleared sufficiently to admit a view of the track of the desolating scourge. A walk through the deserted streets demonstrated that the ruin was even more complete than seemed possible at first. Of the whole easterly section, scarcely a building remained… of the costly and imposing structures and public buildings which were the pride and glory of the people, scarcely a vestige remained; and St. John's lay in the morning as a city despoiled of her beauty, her choicest ornaments, presenting a picture of utter desolation and woe.

Rev. Harvey presents a similar description:

The next morning I took a walk around the awful scene of devastation. It was heart-rending. Nothing visible for a mile from Devon Row but chimneys and fallen and tottering walls. The thick smoke, from the smouldering ruins still filled the air… The wrecks of the fanes of religion stood out, then [sic] broken walls pointing heavenward, as if in mournful protest against the desecration that had been wrought. And the poor inhabitants, where were they? It made the heart ache to see the groups of men, women and children, with weary, blood-shot eyes and smoke begrimed faces, standing over their scraps of furniture and clothing -- some of them asleep on the ground from utter exhaustion -- all with despondency depicted on their faces. They filled the park and grounds around the city. Many hundreds escaped with nothing but the clothes they wore… At least twelve thousand people were burnt out.

Less than $5,000,000 of the total estimated losses of $13,000,000 were covered by insurance. A large influx of financial aid from Britain, Canada and the United States helped the city recover from its devastating losses.

Many of the present-day registered heritage structures were either built or re-built in the reconstruction period after the 1892 fire. The most prominent architect of this era in St. John's was John Thomas Southcott. He designed numerous Second Empire-styled buildings that had distinctive mansard roofs with bonnet-topped dormers protruding from the concave-curved roof surface. Southcott was so prolific that the term the "Southcott style" became associated with the architecture in the re-built city. Each year in Southcott's honour, the Newfoundland Historic Trust presents the Southcott Award for excellence in the restoration of heritage structures.

Because of the devastation of the fire, the city of St. John's reorganized its fire department. It had previously relied only on volunteer brigades. By the end of 1895, the city had hired 22 paid firefighters and established three new fire stations throughout the city. Control of the fire department was placed under Newfoundland Constabulary’s Inspector-General.

== See also ==
- Great Fire of 1846, also in St. John's
