= Great Fire of 1846 =

Fire in St. John's, Newfoundland Colony

Coordinates: 47.5602°N 52.7120°W

The Great Fire of 1846 occurred in St. John's, Newfoundland, a colony of the United Kingdom on 9 June 1846. The fire started at the shop of a cabinetmaker named Hamlin, located on George Street off Queen Street, when a glue pot boiled over. The fire spread along Water and Duckworth Streets destroying all of the buildings in its path aided by the large quantities of seal oil that were stored in the merchants' premises. The fire was also aided by an attempt to blow up a house on Water Street which scattered burning embers across the city.

== Losses ==
In total, the fire killed one artilleryman and two civilians. The artilleryman died as a result of the demolition of the house on Water Street. One civilian died while trying to return to his house to gather his possessions. The other civilian was a prisoner in the court house jail and died when the court house burnt. In addition, two men died several days after the fire while clearing rubble.

The fire destroyed almost all of the buildings on Water and Duckworth Streets as well as Kings Road, about 2000 buildings in total. Included in the destroyed buildings was the Anglican Church (likely the cornerstone laid by Bishop Aubrey Spencer in 1843), the largest private home in the city (belonging to Robert Prowse) and all but one mercantile warehouse in the Riverhead area. A total of 12,000 people (57% of the city's population) were left homeless. The damage was estimated at £888,356 of which £195,000 was covered by insurance.

== See also ==
- List of fires in Canada
- List of disasters in Canada
- Nantucket also had a Great Fire of 1846 on July 13
