= Rabbittown =

Rabbittown or Rabbit Town may refer to:

- Rabbittown, St. John's
- Rabbit Town, Kentucky
- Rabbittown, a Canadian television comedy special which aired in 2006
