= Georgestown, St. John's =

Coordinates: 47°34′08″N 52°43′09″W

Georgestown
- Neighbourhood
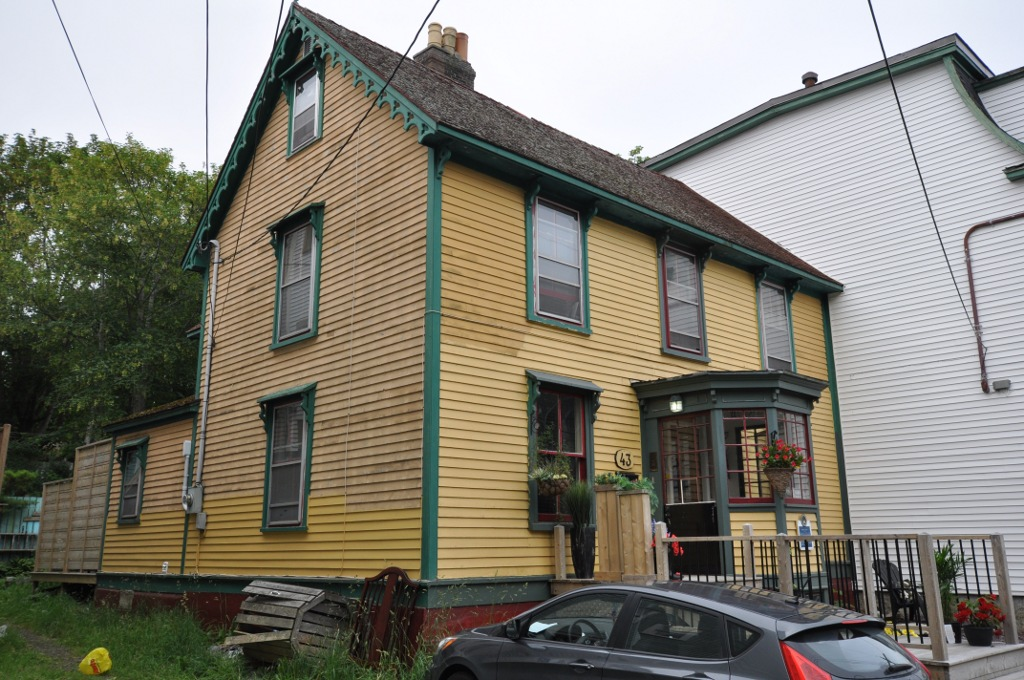
- Harris Cottage, Monkstown Rd, built 1833
- Interactive map of Georgestown
- Country: Canada
- Province: Newfoundland and Labrador
- City: St. John's
- Ward: 2

Government
  - Administrative body: St. John's City Council
  - Councillor: Brenda Halley

Population
  - Total: 1,732

Georgestown is a Neighbourhood Improvement Area in St. John's, Newfoundland and Labrador a short distance north from downtown of St. John's. This was established in the 1970s as part of an effort by Federal and local government to improve inner cities. Originally what was known as Georgestown village was much smaller and only "extended from Donnelly's Lane to what is now Belvedere Street". The neighbourhood improvement area includes, in addition to the original Georgestown, the former Monkstown and Tubridtown, along with adjoining land, including Circular Road, and Belvedere Street as well as some other parts of the former Belvedere Estate. It is bordered by Military Road (north side), Monkstown Road (both sides), Empire Avenue, a small part of Carpasian Road, the east side of Bonaventure Avenue, and Holy Heart and Brother Rice Schools to the west. It was settled, around 1819, as the city's first suburb. The name is an evolution of "George (Winter)'s Town", as it was known in the 19th century.

The use of the term "town" is indicative of the Irish ancestry of many of the residents of St John's: "[Irish] baile 'a town ... a place'. In place-names, a street or neighbourhood in St John's and other communities on the Avalon Peninsula". Also, in St John's, there is Rabbittown, and Hoylestown.

== History ==
After major fires in St John's in November 1817 a delegation of citizens approached George Winter, who owned land north of Military Road, near Fort Townsend (a British military base), with the intent of establishing a village in a safer area. This led to the establishment of what became known as George's town (later Georgestown–sometimes called Georgetown), The village was built on five acres, on the southern slope above Duggan's Gully, a thousand feet to the north of Military Road, and by 1830 George's Town "extended from Donnelly's Lane to what is now Belvedere Street"

The southern boundary of the current Georgestown, Military Road, was originally built to link the British military establishments Fort William and Fort Townsend, and it also forms the northern boundary of Downtown, St John's. Empire Avenue, the northern boundary–formerly called Old Track Rd–is built on the first route in St John's of the Newfoundland Railway.

=== Monkstown ===
This subdivision was developed in the 1860s by James Tobin (later Sir James), who had been born in Monkstown, County Cork, Ireland (Monkstown (Irish: Baile an Mhanaigh - 'the town of the monk). Tobin named the streets of Monkstown after his children, Catherine, William and James (later renamed Mullock) Street. Although Tobin purchased the land in the mid-1840s it was not until "well into the 1860s" that development began.

=== Tubridtown ===
Settled around 1840, Tubridtown, or Tubrid's Town, was "formerly used for an area located east side of Barnes Road, between the Barnes estate, Presentation Convent and St. Bonaventure College properties on the west, and Monkstown on the east". It took its name from James Tubrid who originally owned land in this area.

=== Heritage buildings ===
The earliest surviving building in this area is the Harris Cottage, Monkstown Road, which was built in 1833 by William Harris, who moved to St. John's from Ferryland in 1832. Harris was

one of the earliest identifiable builders in St. John's, a carpenter and master builder who was responsible for many of the houses in what is now known as Georgestown. His son, also called William, followed in his father's footsteps, becoming a master builder himself. He is also credited with building many of the houses in the area.

List of other heritage buildings:

Cramm House, 3 Barnes Road

8 Barnes Road

10 Barnes Road

7 Monkstown Road

Monkstown Manor, 51 Monkstown Road

Peppercorn House, 25 Monkstown Road

== Bibliography ==
- Wallace Furlong. 2004. Georgestown: An Historic Corner of Old St. John's, Flanker Press, St. John's, Newfoundland.

== See also ==
- Architecture of St. John's, Newfoundland and Labrador
- Neighbourhoods in St. John's, Newfoundland and Labrador
- Rawlins Cross, St. John's
- Rennies Mill Road
