= Wedgewood =

Wedgewood may refer to:

== Locations ==
- Wedgewood, Alberta, hamlet in Alberta, Canada
- Wedgewood, Nova Scotia, a neighbourhood in Halifax, Nova Scotia, Canada
- Wedgewood, Michigan, United States
- Wedgewood Brook, a watercourse in New Jersey, United States
- Wedgewood Heights, Edmonton, a neighbourhood in Edmonton, Alberta, Canada
- Wedgewood Park, St. John's, a neighbourhood in St. John's, Newfoundland and Labrador, Canada

== People ==
- Scott Wedgewood (born 1992), Canadian ice hockey player

== Products ==
- Wedgewood stove

== Schools ==
- Wedgewood Junior School, a school in Eatonville, Toronto, Ontario, Canada

== Venues ==
- Wedgewood Rooms, an entertainment venue in Southsea, Hampshire, England
- Wedgewood Village Amusement Park, an amusement park in Oklahoma City, Oklahoma, United States

== See also ==
- Wedgwood, an English fine china, porcelain and luxury accessories manufacturer
- Wedgwood (disambiguation)
