= St. Pius X Church (St. John's) =

Coordinates: 47.578207°N 52.722538°W

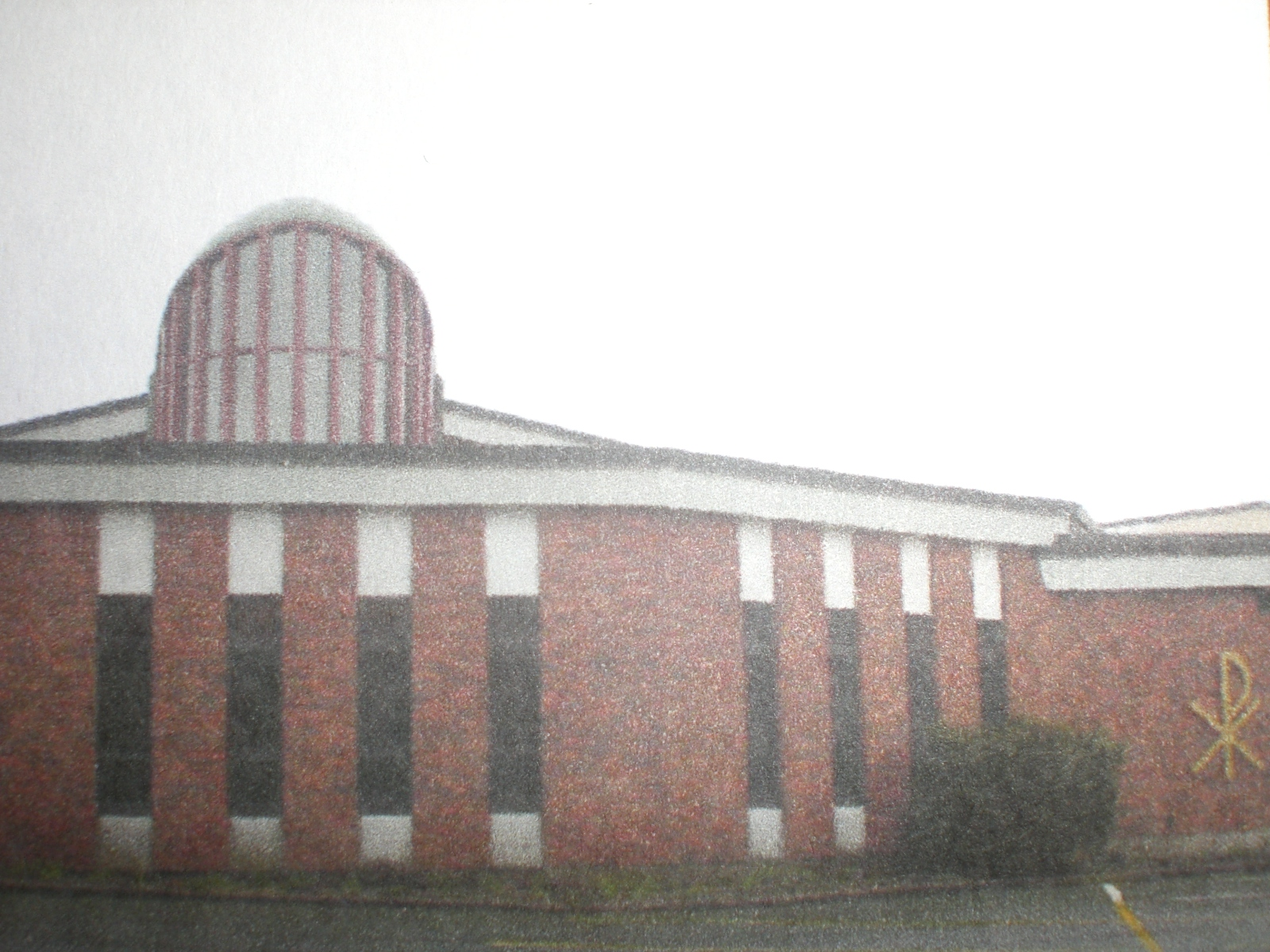

- Location in Newfoundland
- Location: 16 Smithville Crescent; St. John's, Newfoundland and Labrador; A1B 2V2
- Country: Canada
- Denomination: Roman Catholic

History
- Status: Inactive
- Founded: January 15, 1956
- Founder: Archbishop Patrick Skinner
- Dedication: Pope Pius X

Architecture
- Functional status: Parish church
- Architect: Angus Campbell
- Completed: 1 December 1976
- Closed: 18 September 2022

St. Pius X Church is a former Roman Catholic Parish church in the Churchill Park area of St. John's, Newfoundland and Labrador. It was staffed by the Society of Jesus and was next to Gonzaga High School. It was situated on Smithville Crescent off Elizabeth Ave. St. Pius X Church closed in 2022.

== History ==
Before 1955, the Catholics in the Churchill Park area of St. John's were covered by the Basilica of St. John the Baptist. In the 1950s, the Archbishop of St. John's, Patrick Skinner decided that the area needed a chapel and school of its own. In 1955, a site was acquired to serve as a St. Pius X Elementary School. On 19 September 1955, the school was opened and was staffed by the Sisters of Mercy. The ground floor of the school became a chapel and was also dedicated to Saint Pius X on 15 January 1956.

The St Pius X chapel remained a mission of the basilica until 1962, when Archbishop Skinner invited the Society of Jesus to take over the administration of the parish and set up Gonzaga High School. On 2 September 1962, the chapel became a parish church, when the archbishop officially opened it.

In 1967, the elementary school became a school for girls and a St Pius X Boys' School was opened and was staffed by the Congregation of Christian Brothers. From 1968, it became clear that a new, larger church was required to accommodate the congregation and plans were drawn up. On 1 December 1976, in the presence of Archbishop Skinner and Archbishop Penney the new church of St Pius X was opened. It was designed by a local architect, Angus Campbell. The chapel that was previously used, was renovated and became a parish hall for the church and a sports hall for the school. In 1987, a new organ was installed in the church, bought from Casavant Frères.

In 1978, the Sisters of Mercy withdrew from the Girls' School and four years later, in 1982, the Christian Brothers left the Boys' School. Since then, the two schools have been reorganized so that two co-educational schools were formed, one elementary and one junior high school. In 1999, after the Public School Board took over the schools, the elementary school was closed down (the original elementary school building reverted to parish use) and the junior high school was renamed Rennies River Elementary School.

The Public School Board also took over Gonzaga High School. The Jesuits, that year, reopened an independent Catholic school, Saint Bonaventure's College in the city.

St. Pius X Church closed in 2022 after being sold as part of the archdiocese liquidating its holdings in an effort to raise money to compensate victims of abuse.

== Parish ==
The church had three Masses for Sunday, one is at 4:45pm on Saturday evening and the other two are at 8:30am and 11:00am on Sunday morning. There were weekday Masses at 9:30am from Monday to Saturday and at 7:30pm on Monday and Tuesday.

== See also ==
- Gonzaga High School
- List of Jesuit sites
- Saint Bonaventure's College
