= Rawlins Cross, St. John's =

Human settlement in St. John's, Newfoundland and Labrador, Canada

Coordinates: 47°34′07.67″N 52°42′29.52″W

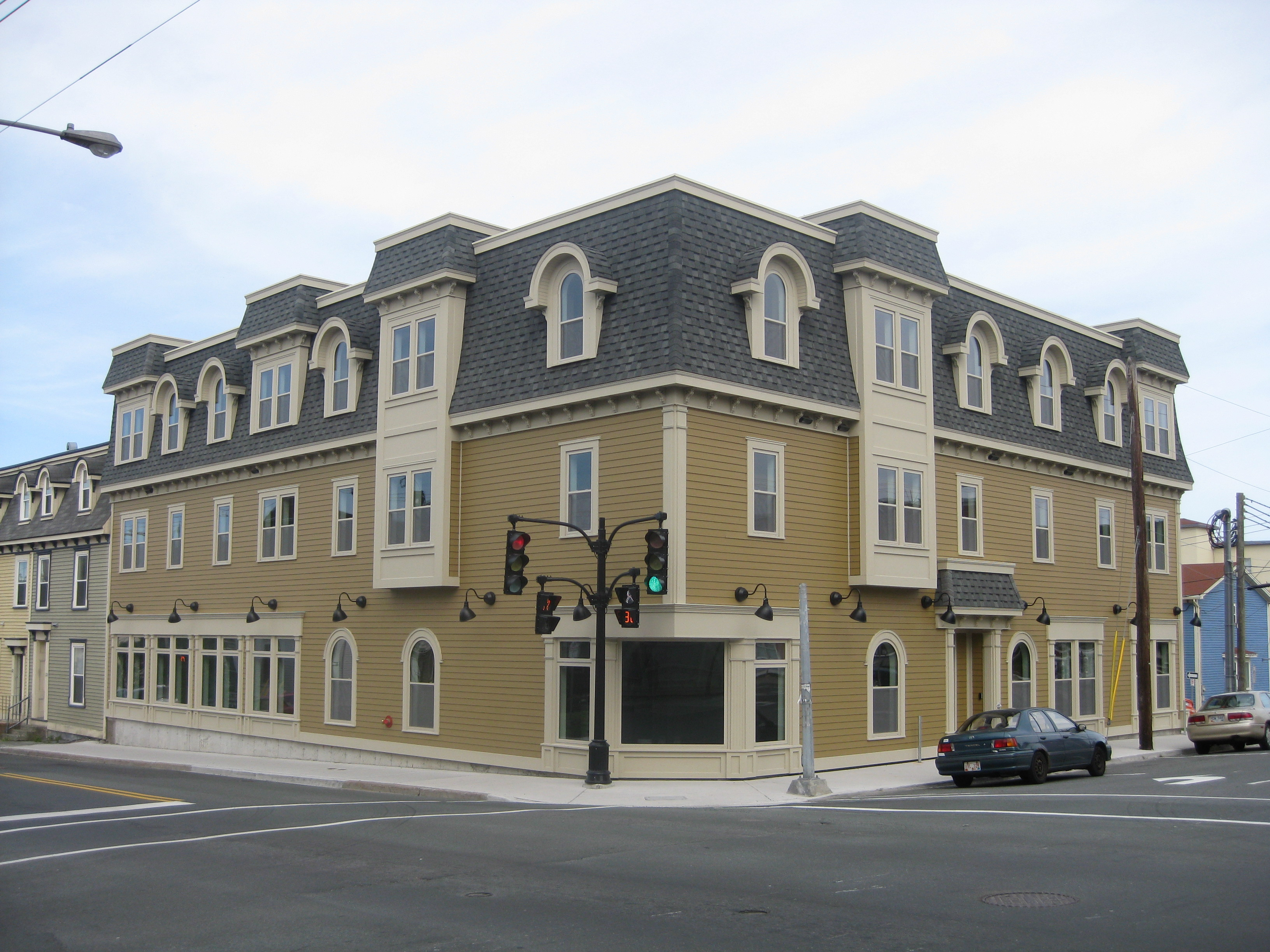
Rawlins Cross

Rawlins Cross (also Rawlin's), formed by the intersection of Prescott and Flavin Streets, Monkstown, Rennies Mill, Queens, and Military Roads, is a well known St. John's, Newfoundland and Labrador landmark. Military Road, built in 1773, was one of the first roads in this area that joined Fort William with Fort Townsend. Monkstown Road (formerly Georgetown Road) was built in the early 19th century and Prescott Street around 1840. It is on the edge of Monkstown, which is part of the Georgetown Improvement Area and Downtown St. John's.

Rawlins Cross takes its name from the Rawlins family who had a grocery store there from at least 1864. Another early business was grocer, James G Pennicuick. T J Eden later had a grocery business in Rawlins Cross, which was bought out by W J Murphy in 1919, as well as O'Mara-Martin Drugs, established in 1892. W J Murphy had initially worked in the drugstore, and T J Eden's before establishing a grocery store nearby at the top of Prescott Street.

It was the site of the first traffic light for the city that was manually operated by a police constable. A commemorative plaque for the St. John's Electric Light Company is located at Rawlins Cross, although the business was established on nearby Flavin Street in 1885.

The popular Newfoundland Celtic Rock band, Rawlins Cross, formed in 1988, takes its name from this St. John's landmark.
