= Virginia Park, St. John's =

Neighbourhood in Newfoundland and Labrador

Virginia Park
- Neighbourhood
- Interactive map of Virginia Park
- Coordinates: 47°35′49″N 52°41′27″W
- Country: Canada
- Province: Newfoundland and Labrador
- City: St. John's
- Ward: 1

Government
  - Administrative body: St. John's City Council
  - Councillor: Jill Bruce

Virginia Park is a neighbourhood in the northeast end of St. John's, Newfoundland and Labrador.

The neighbourhood is a mix of non-profit provincial housing developments and private detached homes. It is located north of Pleasantville, and consists of the area north of Newfoundland Drive and east of Logy Bay Road.

The neighbourhood is represented by the Virginia Waters and Signal Hill-Quidi Vidi districts in the provincial House of Assembly, and is part of the St. John's East district in the House of Commons of Canada.

Virginia Park residents are served by East Point Elementary. . Also, the Virginia Park Community Centre serves the community's youth with a variety of recreational activities.

== See also ==
- Neighbourhoods in St. John's, Newfoundland and Labrador
