= Fortis Building =

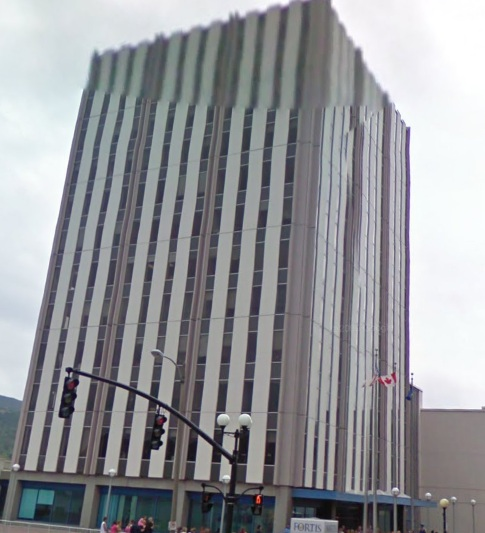
- Fortis Building
- Former names: Royal Trust Building

General information
- Location: St. John's Newfoundland and Labrador, 139 Water Street, Canada
- Coordinates: 47.565713°N 52.705037°W
- Completed: 1969
- Renovated: 1992
- Owner: Victor Lawlor

Technical details
- Floor count: 12
- Floor area: 82,325 sq. ft.
- Lifts/elevators: 3

The Fortis Building is a 12 story high-rise located in downtown St. John's, Newfoundland and Labrador Canada.

== Expansion ==
In January 2010, Fortis Properties, a subsidiary of Fortis Inc., announced plans to retrofit its existing building and construct a new 15-storey building next to it. The plan also called for 382 new parking spaces, an outdoor plaza and a pedestrian walk-way over Water Street to the TD Building, all at a cost of $75 million. The construction of the new building would have involved removing four of the company's existing buildings at 151 to 163 Water Street and Harbour Drive as well as amendments to the St. John's Municipal Plan to allow a building of this height in the downtown.

The proposal was slammed by members of city council, heritage advocates and by the public. After two months of controversy surrounding the proposal, Fortis Properties decided to withdraw their application before it had gone to council to be discussed, stating that they felt they did not have the support of council. The withdrawal of the proposal was also controversial and there were complaints that the city was not business friendly and that the four story height limits in downtown were unreasonable.

In 2011, the city council approves a new development proposed by Fortis to construct a 12 story building at a new location on the west end of Water Street. The company still plans to retrofit their current building to meet Leadership in Energy and Environmental Design (LEED) Silver Certification standards.
