= Kilbride, St. John's =

Coordinates: 47°32′N 52°45′W

Kilbride
- Neighbourhood
- Interactive map of Kilbride
- Country: Canada
- Province: Newfoundland and Labrador
- City: St. John's
- Ward: 5

Government
  - Administrative body: St. John's City Council
  - Councillor: Carl Ridgeley

Kilbride (Irish: Cill Bhríde) is a neighbourhood in St. John's, Newfoundland and Labrador.

Kilbride was once a village located southwest of St. John's. The Way Office was established in 1889 and the first Waymaster was Edward Morris. It had Canadian Post status on May 30, 1891. The population was 438 in 1940 and 121 in 1956.

Kilbride and the Goulds are served hourly by Metrobus Routes 18 and 25.

== See also ==
- Neighbourhoods in St. John's, Newfoundland and Labrador
- List of communities in Newfoundland and Labrador
