= Thomas Wedgwood =

Thomas Wedgwood may refer to:

- Thomas Wedgwood III (1685–1739), English potter
- Thomas Wedgwood IV (1716–1773), English master potter
- Thomas Wedgwood (photographer) (1771–1805), English pioneer of photography
