= Wedgwood (disambiguation) =

Wedgwood is a British pottery firm founded by Josiah Wedgwood.

Wedgwood may also refer to:

== Places ==
- Wedgwood railway station, Staffordshire, England
- Wedgwood, Seattle, neighbourhood of Seattle, Washington, United States
- Wedgwood, Fort Worth, Texas, United States

== People with given name Wedgwood ==
- Wedgwood Nowell (1878-1957), American film and stage actor

== People with surname Wedgwood ==
- Darwin–Wedgwood family, interrelated English families of Charles Darwin and Josiah Wedgwood, founder of the pottery firm

=== Josiah Wedgwood and namesake descendants ===
- Josiah Wedgwood, aka Josiah Wedgwood I (1730–1795), founder of the firm
- Josiah Wedgwood II (1769–1843), son of Josiah I
- Josiah Wedgwood III (1795–1880), son of Josiah II
- Josiah Wedgwood, 1st Baron Wedgwood (Josiah Wedgwood IV) (1872–1943), great-great-grandson of Josiah I
- Josiah Wedgwood V (1899–1968), son of Josiah Wedgwood IV

=== Others ===
- Clement Wedgwood (1840–1889) partner in the pottery firm
- C. V. Wedgwood (1910–1997), English historian
- Emma Darwin, née Wedgwood, (1808–1896), wife of Charles Darwin
- Francis Wedgwood (1800-1888), partner in the pottery firm
- Hensleigh Wedgwood (1803–1891), British etymologist, philologist, barrister and author
- Ivy Wedgwood (1896–1975), politician
- Sir John Wedgwood, 2nd Baronet (1907–1989), politician and industrialist
- Jack Wedgwood, Australian rugby league footballer
- J. I. Wedgwood (1883–1951), Presiding Bishop of the Liberal Catholic Church
- Sir Ralph Wedgwood, 1st Baronet (1874–1956), railway executive
- Susannah Darwin, née Wedgwood, mother of Charles Darwin
- Star Wedgwood, (1904–1995), ceramicist
- Thomas Wedgwood III (1685–1739), father of Josiah Wedgwood
- Thomas Wedgwood IV (1716–1773), eldest son of Thomas III
- Thomas Wedgwood (photographer) (1771–1805), English pioneer of photography, son of Josiah Wedgwood
- Veronica Wedgwood (1910–1997), historian
- William Wedgwood Benn, 1st Viscount Stansgate (1877-1960), father of Tony Benn (formerly Sir Anthony Neil Wedgwood Benn)

== Other ==
- Wedgwood scale, an obsolete temperature scale proposed by Josiah Wedgwood I

== See also ==
- Wedgewood (disambiguation)
- Jasperware
