= Churchill Park, St. John's =

Neighbourhood in Newfoundland and Labrador, Canada

Coordinates: 47°34′31.53″N 52°43′28.37″W

Churchill Park
- Neighbourhood
- Interactive map of Churchill Park
- Country: Canada
- Province: Newfoundland and Labrador
- City: St. John's
- Ward: 4

Government
  - Administrative body: St. John's City Council
  - Councilor: Tom Davis

The neighbourhood of Churchill Park in St. John's, Newfoundland and Labrador is located in the city's centre. The neighbourhood is bordered by Freshwater Road to the west, Empire Avenue to the south, Kenna's Hill, Kingsbridge and Torbay Roads to the east and Elizabeth Avenue to the north. Its main east-west thoroughfares are Elizabeth Avenue and Empire Avenue, and its main north-south thoroughfares are Portugal Cove Road and Allandale Road. The neighbourhood borders the campus of Memorial University of Newfoundland to the north, and as a result, it is home to a sizable student population. The area is made up of single-family homes, mostly built in the 1950s and 1960s.

The area was the first modern suburb of the city of St. John's, and one of the first residential suburbs in all of Canada, with development plans dating back as early as 1944. Initially, it was planned to be a "garden city," with single-family homes on small cul-de-sacs, generous lots, serviced with nearby parks and trails. Post-Confederation, development of the area changed to include social housing blocks and housing cooperatives, which remain today in the west end of Churchill Park. The architecture and design was planned by Paul Meschino.

Churchill Park is home to the Churchill Square shopping centre, which is the area's main commercial centre. Bell Aliant's main switching station for the city is located in Churchill Park. City parks include Kelly's Brook Park, Lions' Park, Larch Place Park and St. Patrick's Park, along with its namesake Churchill Park.

Due to its proximity to the university campus, many of the homes in the west end of the neighbourhood (west of Allandale Road) are rented out to students, thus making it the city's principal student ghetto. Its proximity to campus makes renting costs higher than other areas of the city, such as Rabbittown or Georgestown. Houses in the west end of the neighbourhood are mostly small bungalows and social housing projects. The east end is much more affluent, with larger houses and an established and less transient population.

== See also ==
- Neighbourhoods in St. John's, Newfoundland and Labrador

Churchill Park is a wealthy, higher income area of St. John's that is close to the main campus of Memorial University. Higher end condos, a well-known high school (Holy Heart) and a daily farmer's market are all within the area. Rent in the area ranges from $1,000 a month to $4,000 a month for a full house. Churchill Park is close to the Churchill Square (known to locals as 'The Square') shopping area which has higher end boutiques, small grocery stores and independent offices for finance and lifestyle companies.

The primary student ghetto is in an area with increasing prices; students can expect to pay upwards of $1,500 a month for a student house rental.
