= Rennie's Mill =

Rennie's Mill may refer to several places:

- Tiu Keng Leng, or Rennie's Mill, an area of Hong Kong
- Rennies Mill Road, in St. John's, Newfoundland and Labrador
- Rennie's Mill Road Historic District, a National Historic Sites of Canada in Newfoundland and Labrador
