= George Street (St. John's) =

Street in St. John's, Newfoundland and Labrador

Coordinates: 47°33′42.25″N 52°42′38.89″W

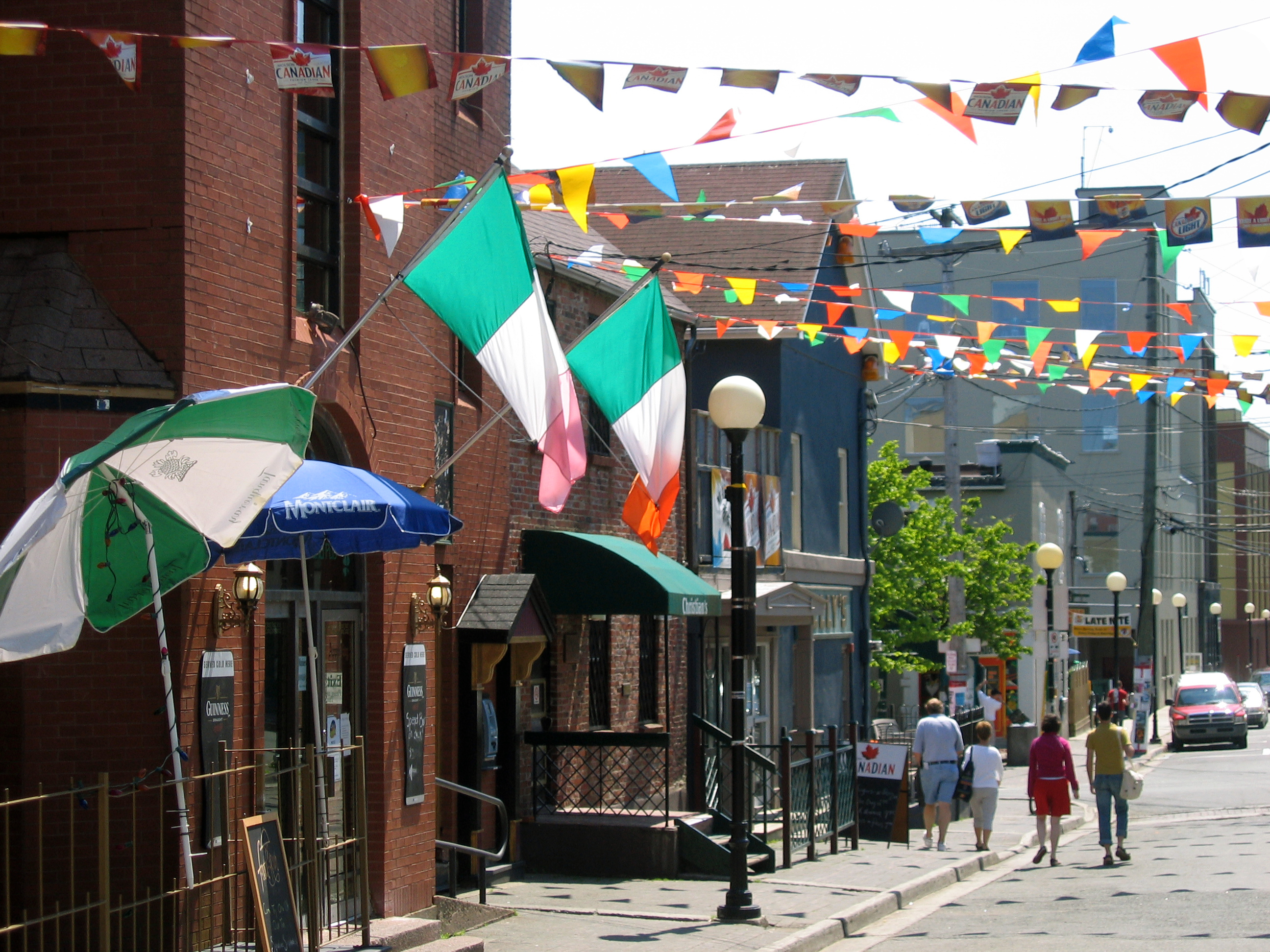
- Interactive map of George Street
- Location: St. John's
- North end: New Gower Street
- South end: Water Street

Trapper John's, George Street, St. John's

Lottie's Place, George Street, St. John's

George Street is a small street located in St. John's, Newfoundland and Labrador, that is known for its many bars and pubs. The two-block long street houses nothing but bars, pubs and restaurants.

George Street is open only to pedestrians in the evenings and during most of the business day, being open to traffic only in the mornings to allow bars to restock their goods. The street does not usually become crowded with people until later at night, around midnight, and will remain busy until early in the morning, possibly as late as 6 a.m., despite the absence of the sale of alcohol. There are however, many hot dog vendors and 24-hour restaurants nearby.

The street is the venue for an annual Mardi Gras celebration in October which can be confusing; most celebrations of this type occur in February in other parts of the world. However, the largest celebration on George Street is the six-night George Street Festival which occurs in early August and typically concludes on the Tuesday night before the Royal St. John's Regatta, which is set for the first Wednesday in August. The festival is rumoured to be the largest of its kind in North America with over 120,000 people making their way through the streets during the six-day period.

George Street was once six blocks long, but with the construction of the St. John's Convention Centre, which sits directly on top of what used to be roughly the middle of the street, the street became "George Street" and "George Street West". As such, George Street proper is now only two blocks long. George Street West is home to a number of businesses, residences and a church, while George Street itself is the predominant home of St. John's' nightlife.

== History ==
The "Great Fire" of 9 June 1846 in St. John's started at the shop of a cabinetmaker named Hamlin, located on George Street off Queen Street, when a glue pot boiled over. The fire killed one artilleryman and two civilians, and burned large portions of the town, including burning all but one mercantile warehouse in the River area.

== Cultural references ==
George Street has been mentioned in a number of songs and other pop-cultural references. These include:

- "The Night Paddy Murphy Died"
- "The Old Black Rum", Great Big Sea
- George Street TV (locally produced comedic TV series, broadcast on NTV and later The Comedy Network)
- The Newfoundland team is named the "George Streeters" in the "National Senior Hockey Championship" episode of Letterkenny.
