= Goulds, St. John's =

Coordinates: 47°28′43″N 52°46′00″W

The Goulds
- Designated place
- Interactive map of The Goulds
- Country: Canada
- Province: Newfoundland and Labrador
- City: St. John's
- Ward: 5

Government
  - Administrative body: St. John's City Council
  - Councillor: Donnie Earle
- Demonym: Gouligan
- Highways: Route 2 Route 3 Route 10; Route 11

The Goulds is a designated place in the Canadian province of Newfoundland and Labrador. It is a rural neighbourhood within the City of St. John's southeast of the city centre.

== History ==
The Goulds was an incorporated community up until 1991, at which time it was amalgamated with Wedgewood Park and Kilbride into the City of St. John's.

== Geography ==
The Goulds is in the City of St. John's on the island of Newfoundland within Division No. 1.

== Demographics ==
As a designated place in the 2016 Census of Population conducted by Statistics Canada, The Goulds recorded a population of 4418 living in 1676 of its 1724 total private dwellings, a change of −2.4% from its 2011 population of 4525. With a land area of 6.13 km^{2} (2.37 sq mi), it had a population density of 720.7/km^{2} (1,866.7/sq mi) in 2016.

== Arts and culture ==
The Goulds is known for having had two residents appear as contestants Canada's Worst Driver: Jillian Kieley (née Matthews) (in Season 11), and Ashley Dunne (in Season 13).

== Transportation ==
Some of the highways going through the Goulds include:

- Main Road (Route 10); link to Kilbride and into downtown St. John's
- Petty Harbour Road (Route 11); link to Petty Harbour-Maddox Cove, Cape Spear, and also into downtown St. John's
- Robert E. Howlett Memorial Drive (Route 3); currently links to Mount Pearl (at Route 2, Pitts Memorial Drive) and will eventually link with new route known as Bifurcation Road

In addition, the Goulds is served by the Metrobus public transportation system, with service connecting with the neighbourhood of Kilbride and The Village Shopping Centre.

== Education ==
The community has three schools: Goulds Elementary for grades K-5, St. Kevin's Junior High School for grades 6–8, and St. Kevin's High School for grades 9-12.

== Notable people ==
- Wayne Johnston, writer
- Jillian Keiley, director

== See also ==
- List of communities in Newfoundland and Labrador
- List of designated places in Newfoundland and Labrador
- Neighbourhoods in St. John's, Newfoundland and Labrador
