= Waterford Valley, St. John's =

Waterford Valley
- Neighbourhood
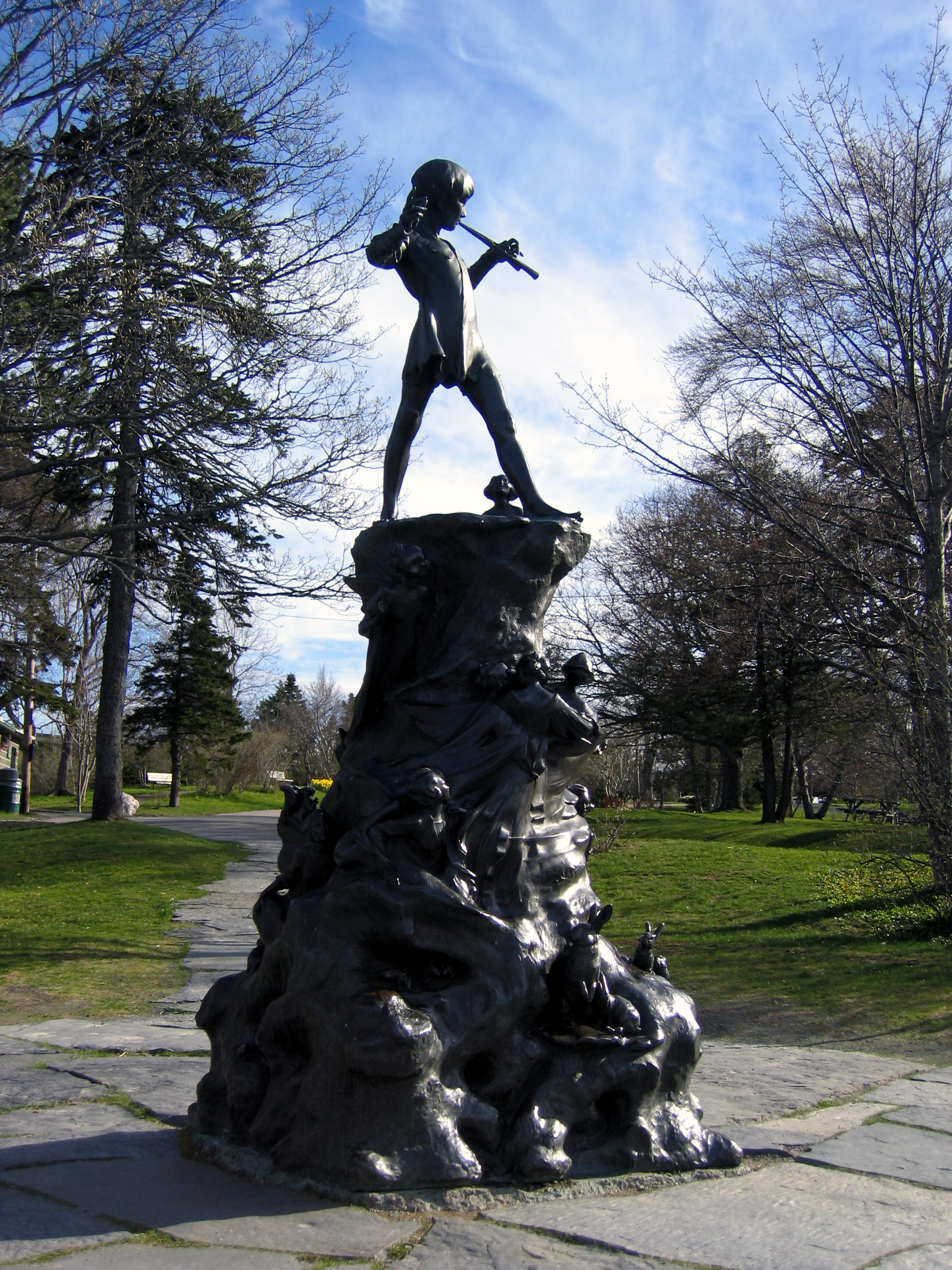
- Statue of Peter Pan in Bowring Park
- Country: Canada
- Province: Newfoundland and Labrador
- City: St. John's
- Ward: 3

Government
  - Administrative body: St. John's City Council
  - Councillor: Greg Noseworthy

Waterford Valley is a neighbourhood in the west end of St. John's, Newfoundland and Labrador.

The Waterford Valley is an affluent area which encompasses the areas from Topsail Road in the north to the Southside Hills at the south, stretching west from the end of Water Street to the city's border with Mount Pearl. This area is home to the Waterford Bridge Road area.

The Waterford psychiatric hospital is in Waterford Valley. The hospital closed in April 2025.

== Notable features of the Waterford Valley ==
- Bowring Park

== See also ==
- Neighbourhoods in St. John's, Newfoundland and Labrador
