= Pleasantville, St. John's =

Coordinates: 47°35′16″N 52°40′50″W

Pleasantville
- Neighbourhood
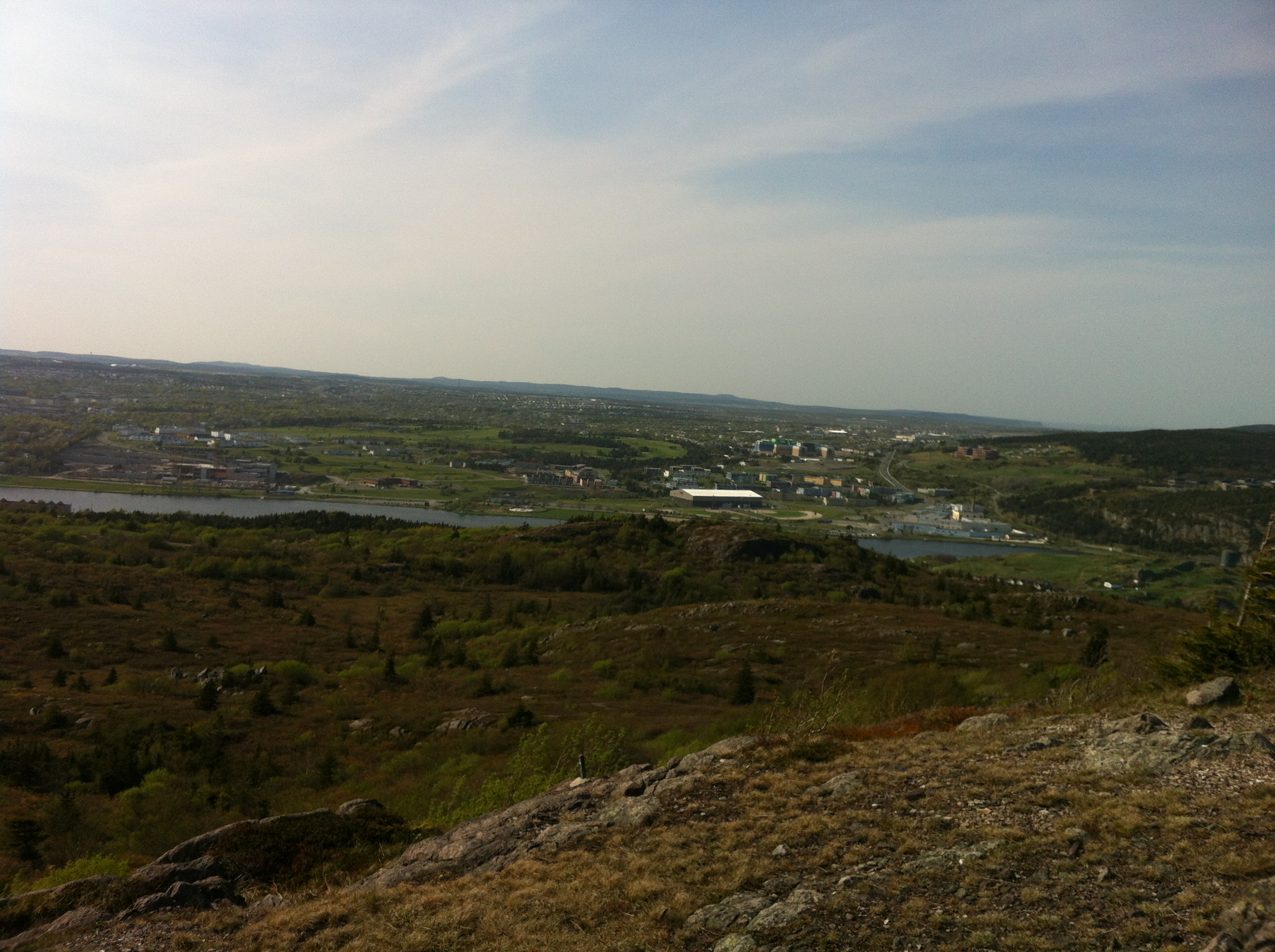
- Pleasantville from Signal Hill
- Interactive map of Pleasantville
- Country: Canada
- Province: Newfoundland and Labrador
- City: St. John's
- Ward: 1

Government
  - Administrative body: St. John's City Council
  - Councillor: Jill Bruce

The neighbourhood of Pleasantville in St. John's, Newfoundland and Labrador is located in the east end of the city, directly north of the downtown. The neighbourhood extends from the north side of Quidi Vidi Lake northward to Newfoundland Drive, and is largely made up of apartment blocks.

A cricket field near Quidi Vidi Lake in Pleasantville served as a military training camp for the Blue Puttees of the Newfoundland Regiment during the month of September 1914, before troops left St. John's on the SS Florizel. In addition, the men practiced skirmishes in an area just east of Quidi Vidi, known as White Hills.

Pleasantville is home to a reserve base of the Canadian Forces and the Country Ribbon meat processing plant, as well as the former site of the Janeway Children's Hospital, now demolished. It includes Bally Haly Country Club.

Most of the area was developed by the United States Military in 1941 and is the former site of Fort Pepperrell, later Pepperrell Air Force Base. The base closed in 1960, and in 1961 the land was transferred to the Canadian Government for use by the Department of National Defence. Many of the buildings the US Military constructed in the area have since been either demolished or turned into government offices or residential units. The former American junior and senior high school building, initially opened for the 1956-57 school year, has been converted into condominiums. Pleasantville is now being redeveloped by Canada Lands Company (CLC) into a residential neighbourhood.

== Redevelopment ==
In 2006, Canada Lands Company, a federal Crown corporation, acquired the federal government's portion of the land with the plan to redevelop the area into a residential neighbourhood. After public consultations CLC applied to the city to construct 958 residential units and 5800 sq. m of commercial space. The residential units will include single family homes, townhouses, duplexes, multi-story units and an assisted living complex. The development also included a $101 million upgrade to the Canadian Forces Station which is located onside of the residential development. The city council approved the proposal in 2009, and progress began in 2010 on the redevelopment. As of August 2012, construction includes the new Department of National Defense building, a new luxury apartment building, and a variety of condominiums.

== See also ==
- Neighbourhoods in St. John's, Newfoundland and Labrador
