= St. Bonaventure's College =

Location
- 2A Bonaventure Avenue; St. John's, Newfoundland and Labrador, A1C 6B3; Canada; 47°34′03.89″N 52°42′43.64″W

Information
- Type: Jesuit (Roman Catholic)
- Motto: "Educating in the Jesuit, Catholic Tradition"
- Established: 1856; 170 years ago
- President: Stephen Handrigan
- Head of Administration, Ignatian Identity and Student Formation: Annette Mallay
- Staff: 42
- Grades: K-12
- Enrollment: 370
- Campus: Urban
- Colors: Maroon, navy blue, gold
- Athletics: Hockey, basketball, ultimate frisbee, soccer
- Website: www.stbonaventurescollege.ca

St. Bonaventure's College (commonly called St. Bon's) is an independent kindergarten to grade 12 Catholic School in St. John's, Newfoundland and Labrador, Canada. It is located in the St. John's Ecclesiastical District, adjacent to the Roman Catholic Basilica of St. John the Baptist. The school is named in honour of one of the Doctors of the Catholic Church, St. Bonaventure.

== Early history ==
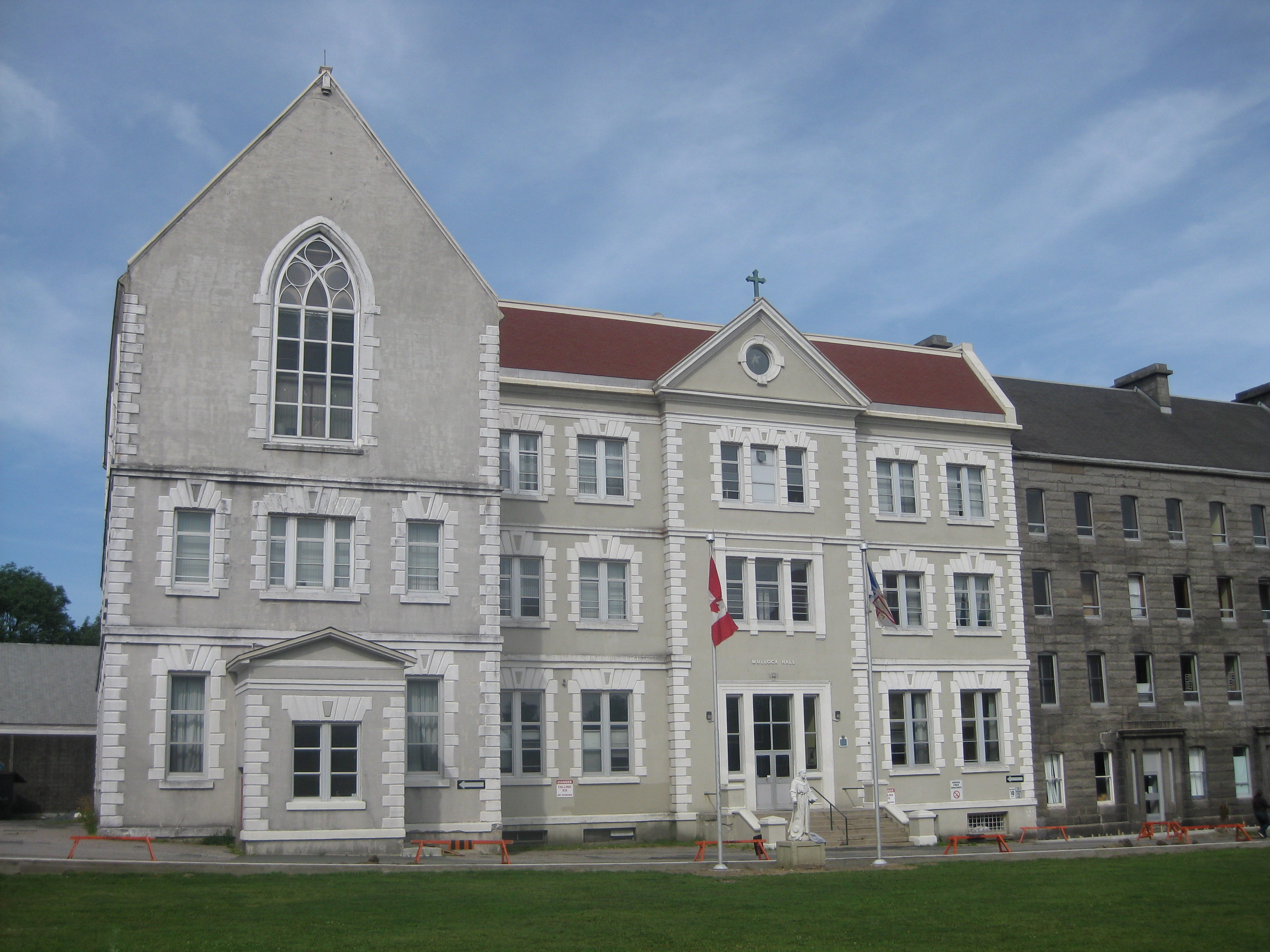
Mullock Hall

In 1855, there was a public auction to sell more than 30,000 building stones from Waterford, Ireland, which had been imported to build the local penitentiary. The Catholic Bishop of the day, Right Rev. John Thomas Mullock, took advantage of plans to build a smaller penal institution and purchased sufficient surplus stones to construct a Franciscan monastery.

In April 1857 the bishop laid the cornerstone of the college named after the Franciscan Order's most scholarly and famous theologian, St. Bonaventure. A year later, in March 1858, the new facilities opened. Dormitories were installed upstairs as the institution operated as a seminary. Seven years later in 1865 the college began to admit secular students and, in 1889, the Irish Christian Brothers assumed administrative responsibilities for the school.

The college remains significant in the history of the Irish language in Newfoundland as, during the Gaelic revival, the sixth President of St. Bonaventure's College was not only a member of the Society for the Preservation of the Irish Language, but also taught classes in the Irish-language there during the 1870s. Although the subject still remains to be explored, Kenneth E. Nilsen, an American linguist specializing in the Celtic languages, has argued in a posthumously published essay that "closer inspection would likely reveal a Canadian counterpart to the American language revival movement."

Mullock Hall was designated as a Registered Heritage Structure on May 15, 1989, by the Heritage Foundation of Newfoundland and Labrador and is listed on the Canadian Register of Historic Places.

=== Holland Hall ===
One of the more modern buildings on the campus is Holland Hall, which sits on the site of the school's former tennis courts (built 1931) which were previously Brother Strapp's "Cricket and Football Crease," affectionately known as "Bartie's Pitch." Holland Hall is a three-storey institutional building, construction on which began in 1957. The building was designed by Frank Noseworthy, while working for architect Frederick A. Colbourne, and is constructed of cast-in-place concrete with large areas of glass block The building of the school was overseen by Brother J.B. Darcy, Present of the college from 1956 to 1960. The building was completed in 1958, and named after Brother F.L. Holland, founding superior of the Christian Brothers in Newfoundland in 1875. In 2018, Holland Hall was one of series of modernist buildings listed by the City of St. John's that could be considered for heritage status.

== Modern History ==
St. Bon's school was closed in 1998 due to the end of denominational education in the province. In 1999, the school was reopened with the Society of Jesus, from their local St. Pius X Church, offering administrative help; it is now the only K-12 private school, and the only Catholic school, in the city.

The school was also a perennial leader in sports and was the first educational institution to institute an annual sports day. The prestigious Boyle Trophy has a long association with the school.

In 2003, St. Bon's became a member of the Jesuit Secondary School Association.

A Strategic Plan was approved by the Board of Governors in 2015. This plan which outlines strategic initiatives to further the school's mission has met with considerable success.

In May 2017, the school launched a news magazine, "Magis." This magazine distributed to the school community and benefactors, outlines how the school is achieving its mission. The school also presents an award to successful young alumni, called the Magis Award. Recipient history can be found on the school's website.

== Notable Graduates ==
Several of Newfoundland's political leaders were educated at St. Bonaventure's. Among its graduates are many Rhodes scholars, Jubilee scholars, two lieutenant governors, three chief justices, five archbishops and six regular Bishops. Newfoundland prime ministers Sir Edward Morris and Sir Michael Cashin were both St. Bon's alumni. Former premier of Newfoundland and Labrador, Danny Williams, also attended St. Bon's, although he graduated from nearby Gonzaga High School.

== See also ==
- List of Jesuit sites
