= Woodbridge River =

Coordinates: 40°32′23″N 74°15′17″W

Woodbridge River Woodbridge Creek
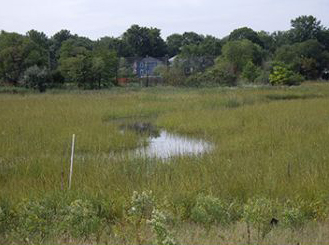
- Tidal branch of Woodbridge River in Woodbridge marsh

Location
- Country: United States
- State: New Jersey
- City: Woodbridge Township

Physical characteristics
- Source: Northeast Woodbridge Township
- Mouth: Arthur Kill
- Length: 5 mi (8.0 km)

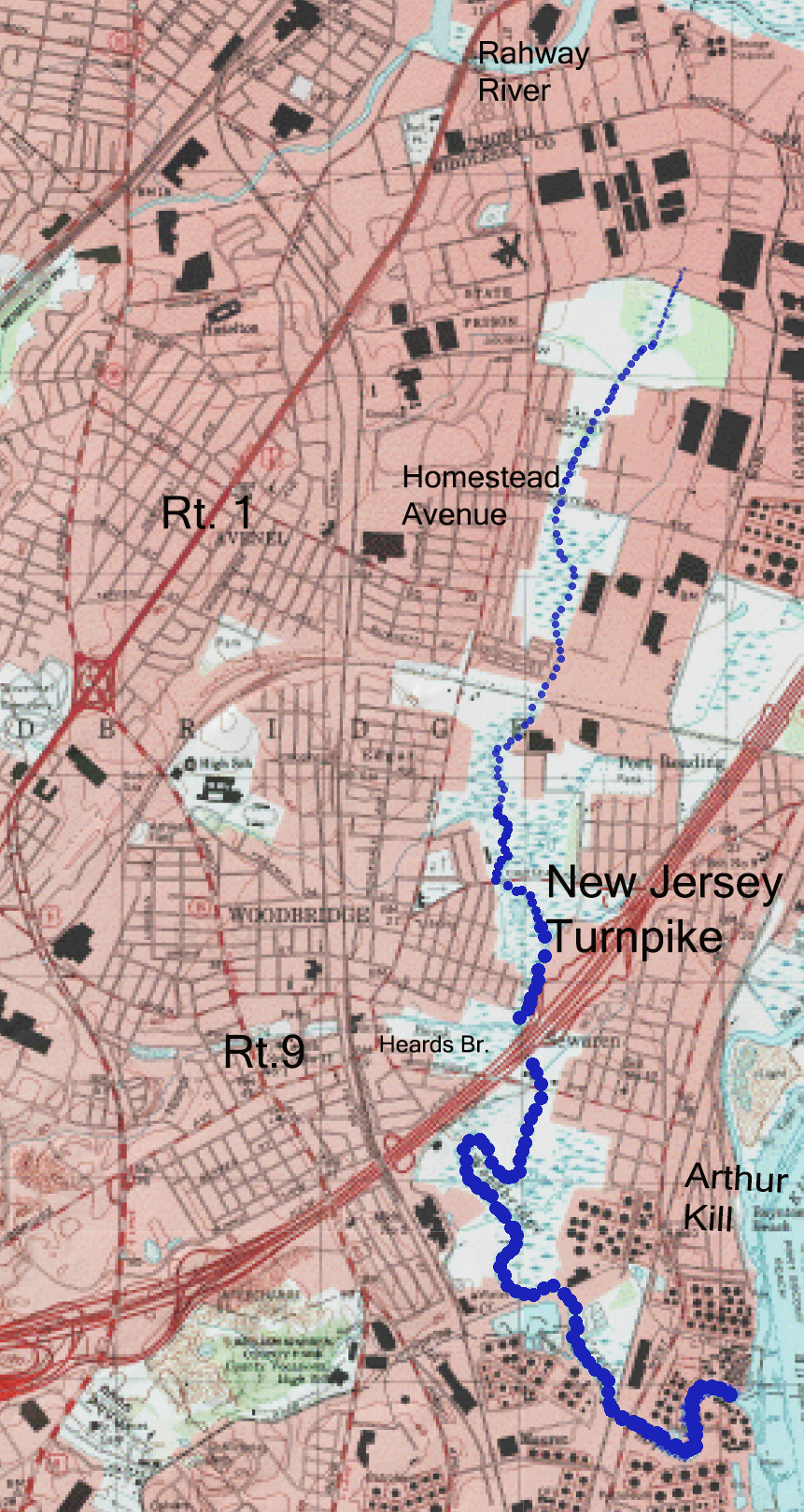
Woodbridge River course in Woodbridge, New Jersey

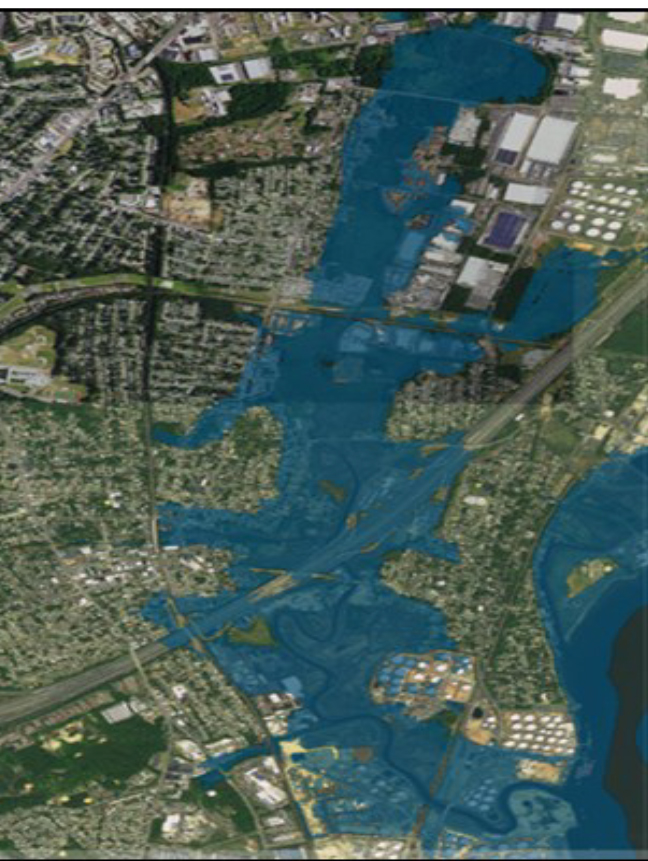
Woodbridge, New Jersey, area inundated by Woodbridge River after Hurricane Sandy (Source: USGS Sandy Storm Tide Mapper)

The Woodbrige River (also known as Woodbridge Creek) is a river in Woodbridge Township, Middlesex County, New Jersey, United States. The river is an important waterway, which frequently floods due to extreme weather caused by climate change, and is expected to increase doing so because of sea level rise. The river includes several conservation areas to protect the diversity of wildlife in the waterway, and the local government is increasingly buying out properties as part of a managed retreat to buffer other properties in the township.

== Geography ==
The Woodbridge River flows south 5 miles in Woodbridge Township emptying into the Arthur Kill. The headwaters are near Omar Avenue in the far northeast part of the township. It is a tidal river for three-fourths of its length, with brackish water below Homestead Avenue. It serves as a basin for about half of Woodbridge. Major tributaries include Heards Brook and Wedgewood Brook in Woodbrige Proper.

== Flooding ==
There is a long history of tidal flooding along this river and its major tributaries. The most extreme flooding occurred during Superstorm Sandy, with a high water mark in the Woodbridge River of 12 feet; low-lying areas along the lower river have only a six-seven foot elevation above sea level. Woodbridge streams and rivers have been described as having a "high flow, flashy nature;" in addition to tidal flooding, fluvial flooding is also common. The land is relatively impervious, and flooding is exacerbated steep slopes and urban cover. Prolonged coastal storms (nor'easters), which combine tidal and fluvial flooding, along with flow constrictions, cause an increase in the duration of flooding of the Woodbridge River and its tributaries, which may last for days before water levels subside. Decadal events have the potential for four-foot flooding in lowest developed areas. Frequency of flooding in these areas have increased over time. Residential areas moved into previous marsh land, decreasing the ability of the land to absorb excess water.

A 1770 map shows that all land surrounding the river was salt marshes. In the most affected area from Hurricane Sandy, Watson-Cramptom, prior to 2009 the area adjacent to the Woodbridge River was zoned for high density residential housing, including the area consisting of wetlands and meadows. When the Sandy came it was "characterized as a tsunami-like water wall," destroying adjoining homes. The Woodbridge River flood zone has become a part of the restoration plan for the riparian environment.

After Sandy, using money from the New Jersey Buyout Program, Woodbridge bought out and demolished many residential properties in the flood hazard areas. Woodbridge's actions and plans have been called a "slow motion evacuation from climate change." As people move out of flood hazard areas, they will be replaced by a "floodplain forest of native trees, shrubs and grass." In Woodbridge not everybody wants to sell; 2050, when the properties have a high probability of severe damage from rising sea levels, seems too far in the future for some. This interferes with the goal of land buffers, entire blocks, between rivers and homes.

== Land preservation ==
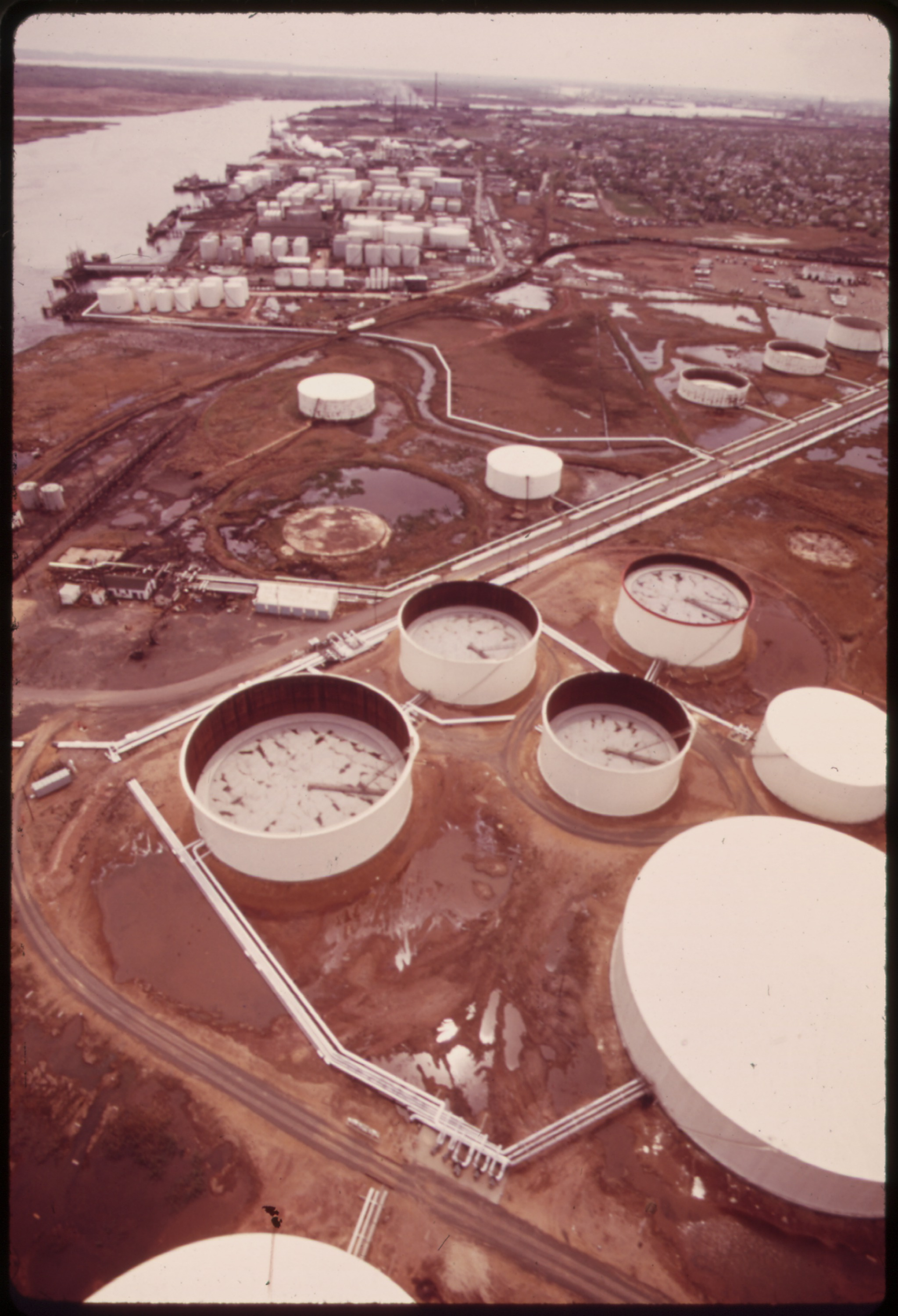
The Woodbridge River enters Arthur Kill, Shell oil plant in foreground

In 2013 the Ernest L. Oros Wildlife Preserve was dedicated; the Preserve occupies 99 acres along the Woodbridge River and has restored the river and adjacent land as a nature preserve.

Many bird species have been observed along the river, particularly at the Oros Preserve. Bird sightings include wading birds (great blue herons and great egrets), the bald eagle, belted kingfishers and Canada goose. Eight mammal species have been noted, including racoon and red fox; nine fish species have been identified, including the American eel. The Preserve has been called "an important hot spot in an otherwise highly developed area".

Downstream and north of Port Reading Avenue is Woodbridge River Park. It is 40 acres, and described as "loaded with channels, backwaters, oxbows and suitable for canoes."
