= St. John's Convention Centre =

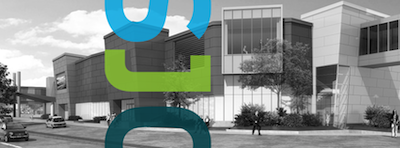
- Interactive map of St. John's Convention Centre
- Address: 101 New Gower Street
- Location: St. John's, Newfoundland and Labrador, Canada
- Coordinates: 47°33′34″N 52°42′44″W
- Owner: City of St. John's

Construction
- Opened: May 2001

Website
- www.sjcc.ca

The St. John's Convention Centre (newly branded as SJCC), located in Downtown St. John's, Newfoundland and Labrador at 101 New Gower Street is the province's largest convention centre with 47,000 square feet (4365 sq m) of divisible meeting space. The convention centre was built in May 2001 along with its sister building Mary Brown's Centre, directly across the street. Both buildings are operated by St. John's Sports & Entertainment Ltd. SJCC is linked to Mary Brown's Centre and the Delta St. John's Hotel by a pedway system.

When SJCC was constructed it was built directly on top of what was roughly the middle of George Street. This resulted in the creation of two separate streets: the popular George Street, known for its record number of bars and pubs, and George Street West, which is home to a number of businesses, residences and a church.

== Expansion ==
In April 2009, a report was completed on the expansion and redevelopment of the Convention Centre. Prior to expansion, the convention centre housed 18,200 sq ft of usable client space. The 2009 report recommended that the convention centre be expanded to 34,650 square feet (3,219 sq m) of space. In December 2009, a request for proposals was placed to find a qualified firm to develop a concept plan for the expansion and redevelopment of the centre. On 31 August 2011, the federal, provincial and municipal governments announced $45 million to expand the convention centre.

The Convention Centre keys were turned over to St. John's Sports & Entertainment on 3 March 2016. The first event of the newly expanded convention centre took place on 4 May, hosting Mari-Tech.

== Technology ==
The new SJCC has been upgraded with sophisticated technological systems including advanced WiFi and internet connectivity, digital telephone systems, remote security software, as well as exterior and interior digital signage.

== Features ==
Many interesting features can be seen throughout the building including the street-visible light-sabres, Lumenpulse lighting, faceted walls, ballroom twinkle lights, and illuminated glass light-boxes visible only from a level 3 corridor. In 2016, the SJCC art committee secured close to $300,000 in art to showcase in the building. All pieces were created by residents of Newfoundland and Labrador.

In a January 2016 press release, SJCC announced the names for its meetings rooms and ballrooms. The unifying thread for each room name is based on parks in the city of St. John's.
