= Cowan Heights, St. John's =

Cowan Heights
- Neighbourhood
- Country: Canada
- Province: Newfoundland and Labrador
- City: St. John's
- Ward: 3

Government
  - Administrative body: St. John's City Council
  - Councilor: Greg Noseworthy

Cowan Heights is a west end neighbourhood in St. John's, Newfoundland and Labrador. Canada Drive and Frecker Drive are the two main road-ways that run through most of the neighbourhood.

== Schools ==
Cowan Heights has two schools. They are St. Matthews Elementary (115 Cowan Avenue) and Cowan Heights Elementary (100 Canada Drive). Though their addresses are on different streets, the schools are directly across from each other.

== Streets ==
Some streets of Cowan Heights are:

- Bancroft Place
- Bellevue Crescent
- Birmingham Street
- Brownsdale Street
- Burin Street
- Burling Crescent
- Burton Street
- Brigus Place
- Browne Crescent
- Canada Drive
- Cape Broyle Place
- Cherrington Street
- Codroy Place
- Cowan Avenue
- Creston Place
- Duntara Crescent
- Ferryland Street (East and West)
- Frecker Drive
- Gander Crescent
- Gillingham Place
- Gladney Street
- Grant Place
- Greenspond Drive
- Harrington Drive
- Hopeall Street
- Lodge Place
- Macleod Place
- Markland Street
- Melrose Place
- Newman Street
- Organ Place
- Point Lemington Street
- Point Verde Place
- Roddickton Place
- Salter Place
- Tanner Street
- Trepassey Place
- Trinity Street
- Torngat Crescent
- Wabush Place

== See also ==
- Neighbourhoods in St. John's, Newfoundland and Labrador
