= Paul Meschino =

Canadian architect

- Education: University of Toronto
- Occupation: Architect
- Projects: Churchill Park area of St. John’s

F. Paul Meschino is a Canadian architect, who was the gold medal graduate of the School of Architecture, University of Toronto in 1939. Meschino was posted to Newfoundland during the Second World War, but "was granted an early release from the Canadian Navy to work for the St. John's Housing Corporation". Paul Meschino was the "architect and designer of the area of St. John’s known as Churchill Park".
