= Gonzaga High School =

Coordinates: 47°34′46″N 52°43′25.74″W

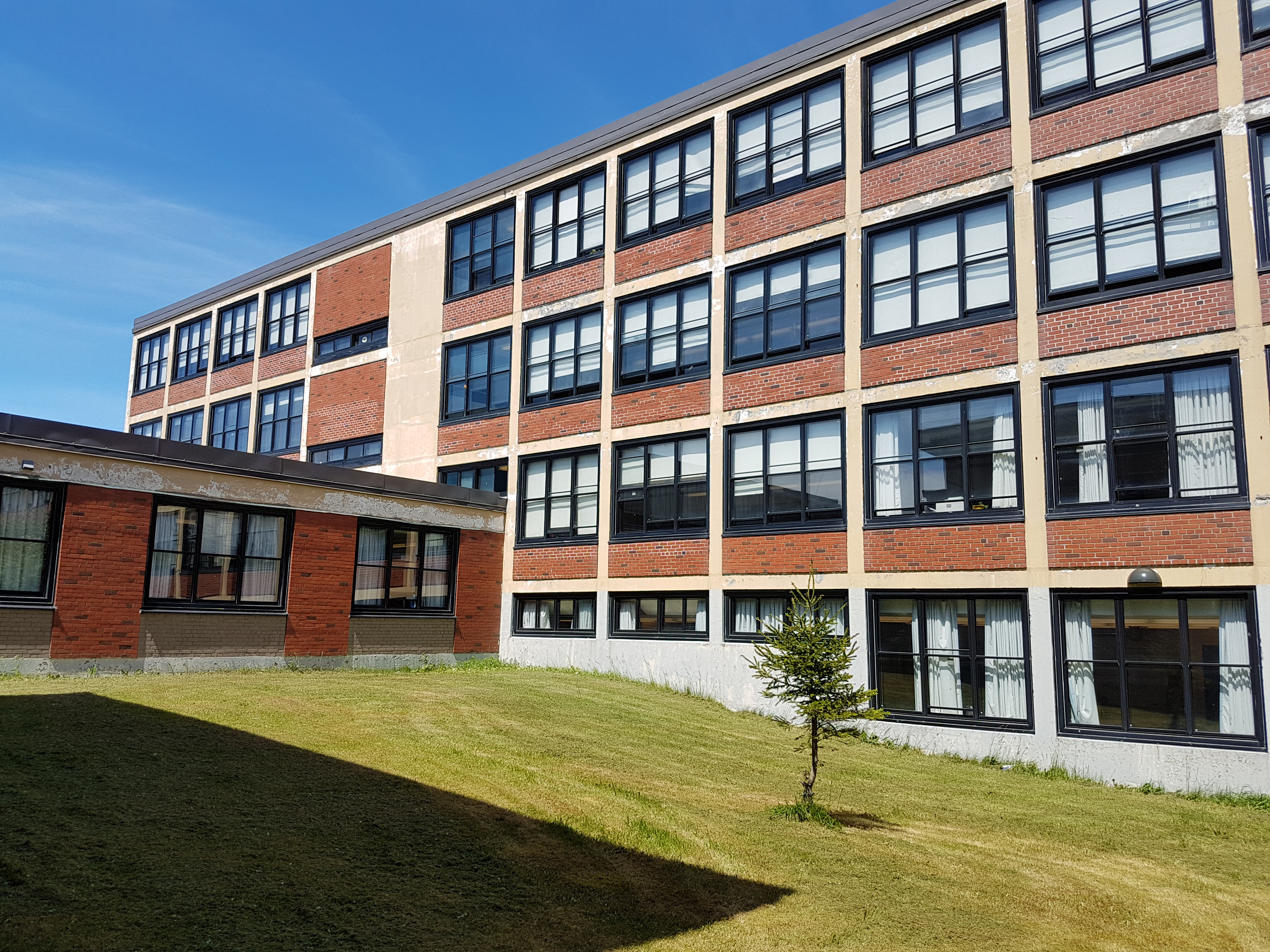

Location
- 20 Smithville Crescent; St. John's, Newfoundland and Labrador, A1B 2V2; Canada

Information
- Type: Public
- Motto: Diliges Dominum Deum Tuum (Thou shalt love the Lord thy God)
- Opened: 1962
- School district: Newfoundland and Labrador English School District
- Principal: Andrew Cluney
- Faculty: 58
- Grades: L1-L4
- Enrollment: 813 (2023–24)
- Colours: Blue and White
- Athletics: Basketball, soccer, rugby, hockey, cheerleading, rowing, golf, softball, volleyball, tennis, badminton
- Mascot: Viking
- Website: sites.google.com/nlesd.ca/gonzaga-high-school/

Gonzaga Regional High School is an educational establishment located in St. John's, Newfoundland and Labrador, Canada. The school began as a Jesuit sponsored all-boys school from grades 9 to 11. It is now a non-denominational coeducational institute for students from Grade 10 (Level 1) to Grade 12 (Level 3), with a 4th level available for those wishing to repeat courses, or those who need more credits to pass. It is adjacent to the former Jesuit St. Pius X Church. Its sports teams are known as the Vikings.

== Achievements ==
In the 1973–1974 school year, a team from Gonzaga (Players: Gerry Beresford, Peter Chafe, Tom Harrington, Seth Reddy, alternate: Michael Bautista) won the national championship of the television quiz show Reach for the Top.

In 2009, 2010, and 2012, Gonzaga's concert band, jazz band and choir competed in the Heritage Festival held in New York City. Both years they won the Festival Sweepstakes Award for the highest overall average of the Festival.

In 2010, The Telegram named Gonzaga High School the second best high school in Newfoundland and Labrador, and the best in St. John's.

== Notable alumni ==
- John Abbott, politician
- Andrew Furey, surgeon and politician, premier of Newfoundland and Labrador
- Tom Harrington, radio and television journalist
- Gemma Hickey, LGBTQ rights activist and author
- Darrell Power, musician, former member of Great Big Sea
- Teddy Purcell, professional hockey player
- Anthony Stack, Brigadier General in Canadian Forces
- Greg Thomey, actor and comedian
- Danny Williams, politician, former premier of Newfoundland and Labrador

== Building ==
The main tower of Gonzaga highschool is a 4-storey block of classrooms. Administration offices, gymnasium, skilled trade workshop and adjoining music rooms (in former chapel) are located in the street level portion of the school set outside the footprint of the tower.

In 1987–1988, Gonzaga received major renovations and had multiple extensions built on adding a skilled trades workshop, drama rooms and no less than 12 new classrooms on the 4 floors. In accommodation with accessibility standards an elevator was added. New washrooms were constructed for the transition from an only boys school.

== See also ==
- List of Jesuit sites
