= St. John's Ecclesiastical District =

Historic district in St. John's, Newfoundland and Labrador

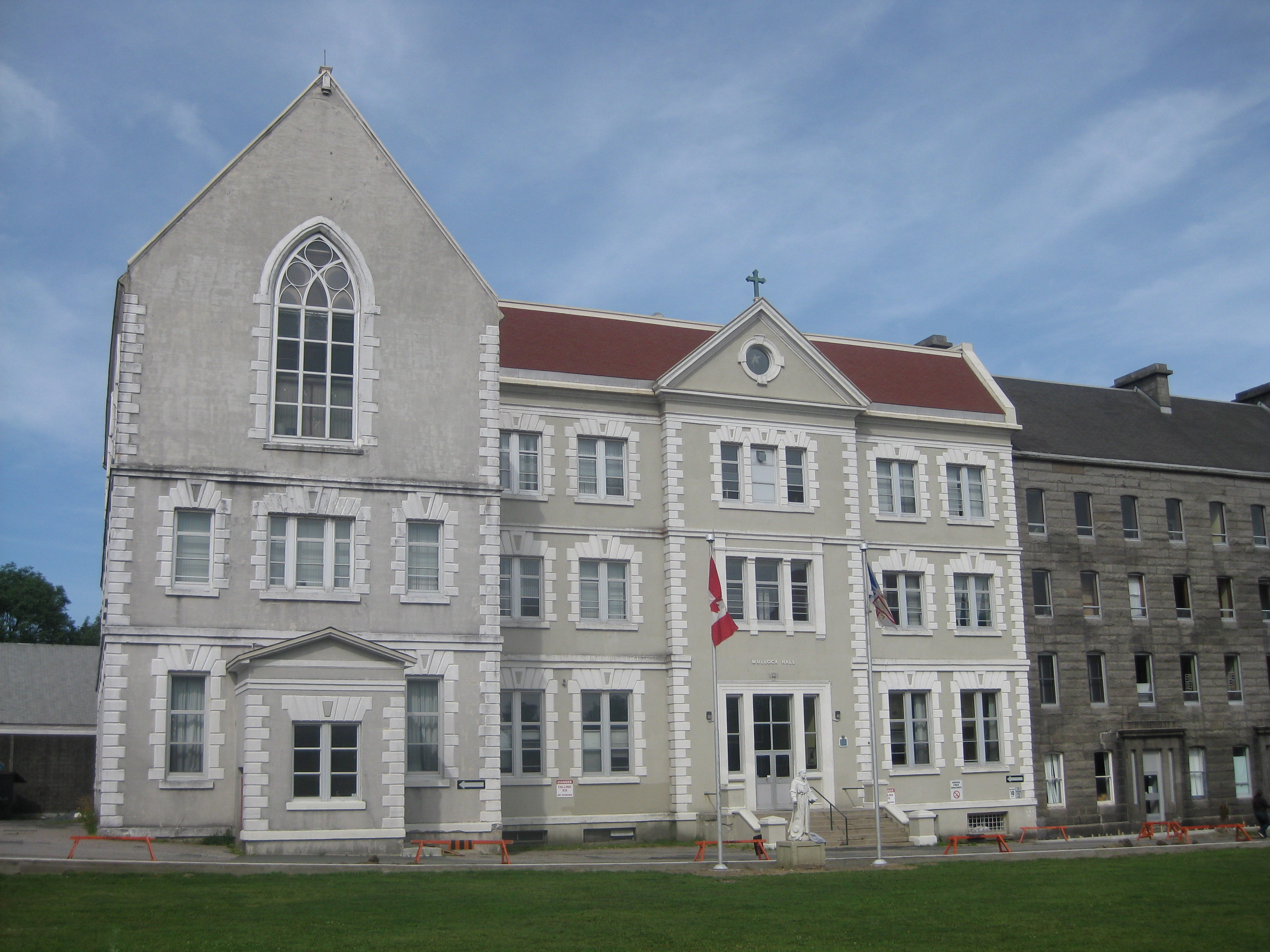

- Location within Newfoundland
- 47°34′04″N 52°42′41″W
- Location: St. John's, Newfoundland and Labrador

National Historic Site of Canada

St. John's Ecclesiastical District is a formally-recognized heritage precinct, located in the central part of St. John's, Newfoundland and Labrador. It is composed of separate nodes containing buildings and spaces associated with the Roman Catholic, Anglican, United Church of Canada, and Presbyterian denominations and is representative of the involvement of Christian institutions in the history and political life of St. John's and the province.

== District description ==
The district extends from the old burial ground at the Anglican Cathedral of St. John the Baptist adjoining Duckworth Street in the south, to Belvedere Cemetery adjacent to Empire Avenue in the north. The district consists of a wide range of buildings in a variety of styles, built in different eras.

The style, scale and placement of these buildings were purposely chosen to reflect both the affluence and influence of religion in Newfoundland and the determination of religious leaders. St. John’s, being the traditional and official centre of commerce, had religious buildings which were grand, solid and filled with symbolism. They were built from materials made to last in the often times brutal coastal climate. Walls of brick and granite rose above the harbour, marking the way for fishermen returning from the fishing grounds. In a town whose population was once divided along religious lines, individual buildings and clusters thereof are associated with personalities who sat in the seats of religious power and the people who found themselves under their guidance, be they orphans, school children, parents or politicians.

Many of these buildings are individually designated either municipally, provincially, or federally. Where possible, the highest level of recognition is included in this list of structures:

- St. Michael’s Orphanage, Belvedere (destroyed by fire in 2017)
- St. Michael's Convent Registered Heritage Structure
- Mount St. Francis Monastery Registered Heritage Structure
- St. Bonaventure’s College Registered Heritage Structure
- The Monastery Registered Heritage Structure
- Bishop’s Library Registered Heritage Structure
- Bishop’s Palace Registered Heritage Structure
- Basilica Cathedral of St. John the Baptist National Historic Site
- St. John the Baptist Entrance Archway Municipal Heritage Building
- Presentation Convent and School Registered Heritage Structure
- The Convent of Our Lady of Mercy Registered Heritage Structure
- Oratory of the Sacred Heart Registered Heritage Structure
- Benevolent Irish Society (BIS) Building Registered Heritage Structure
- O'Donel Memorial Hall Registered Heritage Structure
- St. Andrew’s Presbyterian Church (The Kirk) Registered Heritage Structure
- Gower Street United Church Registered Heritage Structure
- The Deanery (Anglican Cathedral Parish Rectory) Municipal Heritage Building
- Anglican Cathedral Parish House Municipal Heritage Building
- Cathedral of St. John the Baptist National Historic Site

The district also includes several modernist structures, including:

- Holy Heart of Mary Regional High School
- Brother Rice School
- Brother O'Hehir Arena
- Holland Hall
- St. Bon's Forum
- The Lantern (Presentation School)

The district includes a number of burial places, including:

- Anglican Cathedral Churchyard
- Belvedere Cemetery
- Presentation Sisters Cemetery
- Sisters of Mercy Cemetery
- Christian Brothers Cemetery
- sites of the former Long's Hill Roman Catholic and Methodist cemeteries (both relocated circa 1840-50s)

== Municipal designation ==
The movement to press for official recognition and protection of the district began in 2004. Then committee chair, landscape architect Fred Hann, was quoted as saying,

It's important to conserve the ecclesiastical district because it has the largest number of ecclesiastical buildings of comparable size in North America," he said. "It's an area of outstanding cultural beauty. The history of the structures and the role the churches played in the economy of the province is important. It has helped shape the city.

Preliminary meetings were organized by the Heritage Foundation of Newfoundland and Labrador and the City of St. John's, along with representatives of the buildings in the area and the Newfoundland Historic Trust. In 2005, it was announced that the City would designate the district, in order to both support a nomination for national heritage status, and to "ensure the buildings are protected in the future and help bring visitors to the city." Following the announcement, the district was designated as a municipal heritage district by the City of St. John's and was officially recognized by St. John's Municipal Plan Amendment Number 29, 2005, approved 8 August 2005. The designation included approximately 30 buildings. The municipal district was listed on the Canadian Register of Historic Places on 2 December 2005.

== National Historic Site designation ==
In 2005, a nomination was made by the Heritage Foundation of Newfoundland and Labrador and the City of St. John's to the Historic Sites and Monuments Board to have the district made a National Historic Site.

The district was designated a National Historic Site of Canada in 2008. Official recognition refers to three nodes in the downtown area of St. John’s. A plaque commemorating the designation was unveiled in 2010 by Jim Prentice, Minister of the Environment, and Senator Fabian Manning. Mayor Dennis O'Keefe stated,

This has been a long time waiting to be recognized, and the day has finally arrived. It's a celebration for the city, it's a celebration for the churches, because the churches have been so important and influential in developing the character of the city and the province and the people who live here.

The site was shortlisted as a finalist for the second annual Canadian Institute of Planners' (CIP) Great Places in Canada contest in 2012. The National Historic Site was listed on the Canadian Register of Historic Places on 2 June 2020.

== Development concerns ==
The special historic and architectural nature of the St. John's Ecclesiastical District has been invoked in several discussions and controversies around development issues within, and adjacent to, the district. In 2004, the proposed (and current) site of The Rooms Provincial Museum Archives and Art Gallery was challenged for being too near the district and that its massing was too large, with one critic writing that "buildings like the Roman Catholic Basilica of St. John the Baptist are overpowered by it."

At the time of municipal designation, most property owners were in favour, though some "expressed concerns about the possibility of added restrictions." City Councillor Shannie Duff addressed these concerns, stating that added restrictions would not happen, adding, "This doesn't make it any more restrictive than they already are in Heritage Area 1."

In April 2021, the Heritage Foundation of Newfoundland and Labrador called for the development of "a management plan for the Ecclesiastical District National Historic Site, with stakeholders, to ensure that future development is sympathetic to its heritage values."

== See also ==
- List of National Historic Sites of Canada in Newfoundland and Labrador
- List of historic places in St. John's, Newfoundland and Labrador
- Neighbourhoods in St. John's, Newfoundland and Labrador
