= Neighbourhoods in St. John's, Newfoundland and Labrador =

The city of St. John's is made up of many neighbourhoods. Neighbourhoods such as Georgestown and Rabbittown have long histories in the city and were among the first residential neighbourhoods to be built, while other neighbourhoods such as the Goulds and Kilbride are former communities that have been amalgamated with St. John's.

== City Centre ==
- The Battery
- Buckmaster's Circle
- Cookstown: Area at top of Long's Hill
- Dogstown: Off Duckworth St. E.
- Downtown
- St. John's Ecclesiastical District
- Fort Amherst
- Georgestown–includes Tubridtown and Monkstown.
- Quidi Vidi
- Rabbittown

== East End ==
- Bally Haly
- Churchill Park
- East Meadows
- Hoylestown
- Pleasantville
- Rennies Mill Road
- Quidi Vidi

== Northeast ==
- Airport Heights
- Clovelly Trails
- King William Estates
- Wedgewood Park
- Virginia Park

== West End ==
- Amherst Heights
- Brookfield Estates
- Bristolwood
- Cowan Heights
- Grovesdale Park
- Kenmount Terrace
- Mundy Pond
- Waterford Valley
- Westgate
- Wishingwell Park

== Southeast ==
- Blackhead
- Kilbride
- Shea Heights

== Southwest ==
- Brookfield Plains
- Galway
- Goulds
- Richmond Hill
- Southlands
