= Buckmaster's Circle =

Coordinates: 47°33′33″N 52°42′21″W

- Neighbourhood
- Interactive map of Buckmaster's Circle
- Country: Canada
- Province: Newfoundland and Labrador
- City: St. John's
- Ward: 2

Government
  - Administrative body: St. John's City Council
  - Councilor: Ophelia Ravencroft

Population
  - Total: 600

The neighbourhood of Buckmaster's Circle is located in central area of St. John's, Newfoundland and Labrador, Canada.

Buckmaster's Circle is one of the oldest public housing communities in the province, having been built in the mid-1960s by Canada Mortgage and Housing Corporation. The property was administered by the St. John's Authority until the early 1970s when Newfoundland and Labrador Housing Corporation assumed responsibility for the Housing Authority's portfolio. The community consists of 120 dwellings which are home to close to 600 people.

Buckmaster's Circle Community Centre opened in 1993 with a mandate to provide social, educational, recreational, health and employment programs. In addition to providing a place for the local tenant association to meet and to offer various support programs, the facility is also the home to a branch of the St. John's Boys & Girls Club.

The neighbourhood has benefited from recent investments. In 2007, partly in reaction to a graffiti problem, the Newfoundland and Labrador Housing Corporation funded the exterior painting of all homes. In 2008, construction began on Buckmaster's Rotary Park, funded by donations from the Rotary Club of St. John's Northwest and the municipal, provincial and federal governments.

== See also ==
- Neighbourhoods in St. John's, Newfoundland and Labrador
