= Jillian Keiley =

- Born: 1970 (age 55–56); Goulds, Newfoundland, Canada
- Occupation: Director

Jillian Keiley is a Canadian theatre director.

== Early life and education ==
Keiley was born in 1970 and raised in Goulds, a community just south of St. John's, in Newfoundland, Canada. She attended St. Kevin's High School and York University, completing the theatre directing program in 1994.

== Career ==
While attending York University, Keiley founded the Splash Cabaret Series in St. John's. After graduating college, she moved back to St. John's. Keiley served as the artistic director of Artistic Fraud of Newfoundland for 18 years.

For Artistic Fraud, Keiley has directed The Cheat, Jesus Christ Superstar, and Burial Practices, among others. In 2002, Keiley directed Tempting Providence, which toured from 2003 to 2014. During this period, Keiley was an annual instructor of chorus with the National Theatre School of Canada, and directed theatre and opera productions in Australia, Ireland, and Canada.

Keiley became the artistic director of the National Arts Centre English Theatre in 2012. Keiley left the National Arts Centre in 2022 after 10 seasons.

For the Stratford Festival, she directed The Diary of Anne Frank (2015), and As You Like It (2016), and The Neverending Story (2019).

== Personal life ==
Keiley is married to music producer Don Ellis, with whom she has one daughter.

== Awards ==
- Canada Council's John Hirsch Prize - 1998
- Siminovitch Prize for Directing - 2004
- Betty Mitchell Award for Outstanding Direction - 2006
- Memorial University of Newfoundland Honorary Doctorate of Letters - 2009
