= Anthony Stack =

Canadian Army general (born 1961)

Anthony Thomas Stack
- Born: 1961 (age 64–65); St. John's, Newfoundland
- Military career
- Allegiance: Canada
- Branch: Canadian Forces
- Service years: 1978 – 2016
- Rank: Brigadier General (Retired)
- Commands: 37 Canadian Brigade, Land Forces Atlantic Area
- Conflicts: Operation Enduring Freedom: Operation ATHENA

Brigadier General Anthony Thomas Stack, OMM, CD is a Brigadier General in service of the Canadian Forces. He is the Deputy Commander of the Land Force Atlantic Area.

== Early life ==
Stack, was born in St. John's, Newfoundland in 1961. He attended Gonzaga High School, and was a member of 2415 Gonzaga Royal Canadian Army Cadets Corps.

== Military career ==
Stack enlisted in the Army reserve in 1978. He served two terms as the commanding officer of the 56 Field Engineer Squadron, as well as one term as G3 Newfoundland District. He was also company commander and chief instructor at the Atlantic Area Rank and Trade School in Gagetown, New Brunswick. A graduate of the Army Command and Staff College in Kingston, Ontario, and the Joint Reserve Command and Staff Program at the Canadian Forces College in Toronto. In 2001 Brigadier-General Stack was the first commanding officer of the Land Force Atlantic Area Civil-Military Co-operation (CIMIC) unit. In January 2004, he deployed with Operation ATHENA to Afghanistan, where he served as the chief of CIMIC Operations for the NATO-led International Security Assistance Force in Kabul. After returning from Afghanistan he was promoted to lieutenant colonel and placed in deputy command of 37 Canadian Brigade group. In 2006 he was promoted to the rank of colonel and assumed command of the brigade. In December 2009 he was promoted to the rank of brigadier general and made deputy commander of the Land Force Atlantic Area.

== Civilian life ==
At the Memorial University of Newfoundland Brigadier-General Stack earned a Bachelor of Education (Secondary) and Bachelor of Science (Mathematics) degrees in 1985 and obtained a Master of Education (Leadership Studies) in 2001. Today Brigadier General Stack was also the principal of St.Peter's Junior High School in Mount Pearl, Newfoundland and Labrador before leaving in 2011. He has a wife named Wanda and one son named Shane.
