= Wedgewood Park, St. John's =

Coordinates: 47.604°N 52.710°W

Wedgewood Park
- Neighbourhood
- Interactive map of Wedgewood Park
- Country: Canada
- Province: Newfoundland and Labrador
- City: St. John's
- Ward: 1

Government
  - Administrative body: St. John's City Council
  - Councilor: Jill Bruce

Wedgewood Park is a neighbourhood in St. John's, Newfoundland and Labrador, located north of the city centre.

A former town, Wedgewood Park was amalgamated into the city along with other areas, most notably the town Goulds, in 1991.

Wedgewood Park lies in the Torbay Road, Highland Drive, Carrick Drive, and Newfoundland Drive area.

== See also ==
- Neighbourhoods in St. John's, Newfoundland and Labrador
