= Metrobus Transit =

Public bus in St. John's, Newfoundland, Canada

Metrobus
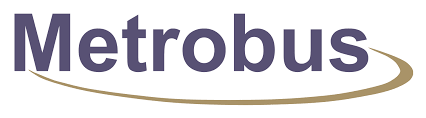

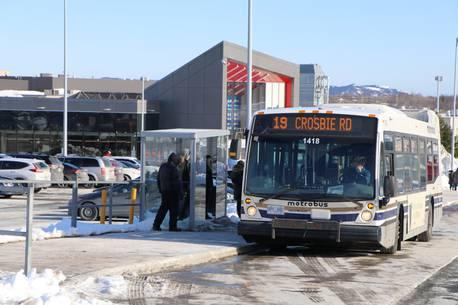
- 1418; 2014 Nova Bus LFS, Avalon Mall
- Founded: 1958
- Headquarters: 25 Messenger Drive, St. John's, Newfoundland and Labrador
- Service area: St. John's, Mount Pearl, and Paradise
- Service type: Public transit
- Routes: 22
- Stops: 833
- Hubs: 3
- Fleet: 61
- Annual ridership: 3 million (2013)
- Fuel type: Diesel & hybrid
- Operator: St. John's Transportation Commission (City of St. John's)
- Transportation Commission Chair: Paul Walsh
- Website: www.metrobus.com

Metrobus is a public transport system owned by the city of St. John's, Newfoundland and Labrador, Canada. It operates a fleet of diesel and hybrid buses. A total of 22 bus routes serve St. John's and its western suburbs of Mount Pearl and Paradise, carrying 2.9 million passengers in 2016 and 4,759,834 in 2023.

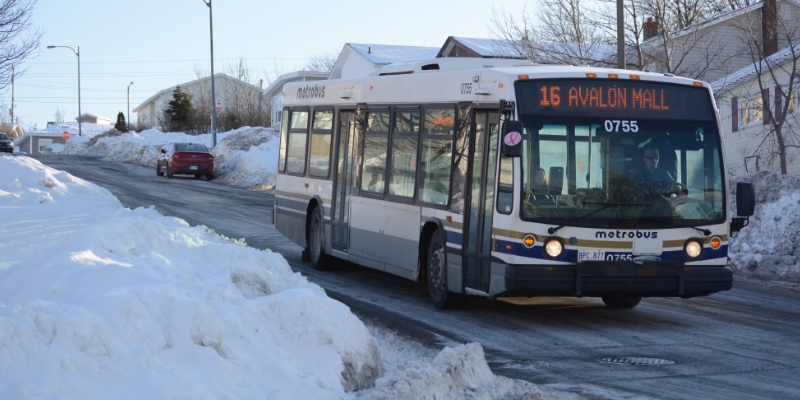
0755; 2007 Nova Bus LFS

== History ==
St. John's Transportation Commission is a board consisting of six members and a chair, appointed by St John's City Council.

Metrobus Transit currently operates 24 routes. Routes travel around the cities of St. John's, Mount Pearl, and Paradise; and service major destinations including the Avalon Mall, Village Shopping Centre, Memorial University, Confederation Building, College of the North Atlantic, Marine Institute, Paradise Double Ice Complex arena, Shoppes at Galway, Mile One Centre, and downtown St. John's.

Metrobus has had two strikes, in 2004 and 2010. The first lasted roughly two weeks, and wages were the key issue; the introduction of a 50/50 cost-sharing health benefit system was the key issue in the 2010 dispute. The latter dispute lasted about three months and was settled with a modest pay hike on January 27, 2011.

In 2006, Metrobus Transit upgraded its fare system to use a smart card system called the m-Card, which replaces tickets and monthly passes with a reloadable card and offers a points and rewards loyalty program. (Note: m-Card November 7, 2010)

In 2012, Metrobus Transit acquired nine new fully accessible Nova LFS Smart Buses and planned to purchase twenty-one additional buses by 2017. The Smart Bus technology on these buses can improve fuel economy by up to 18% and significantly reduce greenhouse gas emissions. From the outside, the new buses look very similar to the other low-floor buses already in its fleet, but they are fully accessible and include a wheelchair ramp and other related equipment. (Note: Metrobus Transit takes delivery of nine new fully accessible low-floor buses February 24, 2012.) In 2017, St. John's and the federal government jointly funded 18 accessible replacement buses and 39 additional bus shelters.

In 2018, Metrobus introduced three brand-new Grande West Vicinity 30 ft (9.1 m) buses, which are 10 ft shorter than the previous model purchased over the years to operate on smaller routes and offer a more fuel-efficient and quiet ride.

== Bus fleet ==
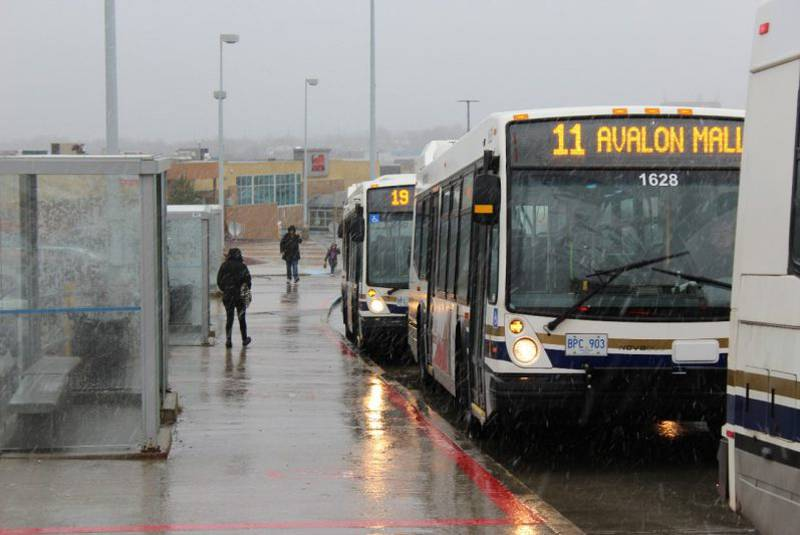
Nova Buses at the Avalon Mall.

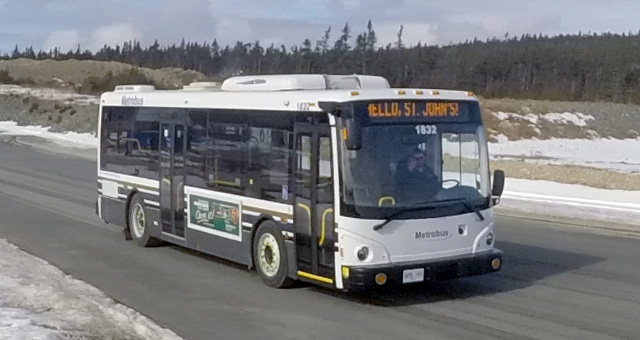
1832 2018 Grand West Vicinity Bus.

Metrobus Transit currently operates a fleet of 61 Nova LFS buses (0753-2574), 3 Grande West Vicinity buses (1831 - 1833 and 2134), and one Chevrolet 4500 Arboc Spirit of Freedom (Community Bus).

== Routes ==
Metrobus operates most routes year-round, except for Routes 24 which do not operate during the summer schedule (late June–September). Primary and base routes usually operate at a 30-minute frequency on weekdays, with 60-minute frequency during the evenings and on weekends. Routes 1, 2, 3 and 10 operate at a 15-minute frequency during peak periods between key points.

Route 28, also known as the Community Bus, is an accessible door-to-door route that connects select senior apartment complexes in the St. John's area with major shopping attractions.

Route 30 entered service on June 27, 2016, during the Metrobus summer schedule's period of operation, serving 55 new bus stops within the Town of Paradise.

In September 2025, Metrobus made Routes 22 and 30 all-day services to Mount Pearl and Paradise.

In January 2026, Metrobus changed Route 23 to all-day service and discontinued Route 3A, so Route 3B is now simply known as Route 3. they then added a second bus for Route 14 during peak hours and added a new route, Route 29, which runs from MUN's Signal Hill campus to Mount Scio Road.

Metrobus also offers an accessible door-to-door, on-demand service called GoBus, whose operation is contracted out to MV Transportation.
