= Rabbit Town, Kentucky =

Rabbit Town
- Unincorporated community
- Location within the state of Kentucky Rabbit Town (the United States)
- Coordinates: 37°54′21″N 84°00′55″W
- Country: United States
- State: Kentucky
- County: Clark
- Elevation: 807 ft (246 m)
- Time zone: UTC-6 (Central (CST))
  - Summer (DST): UTC-5 (CST)
- GNIS feature ID: 508893

Rabbit Town is an unincorporated community in Clark County, Kentucky, United States.
