= Wedgewood Brook =

Wedgewood Brook is a tributary of Woodbridge River, located within Woodbrige Proper, Middlesex County, New Jersey, U.S.

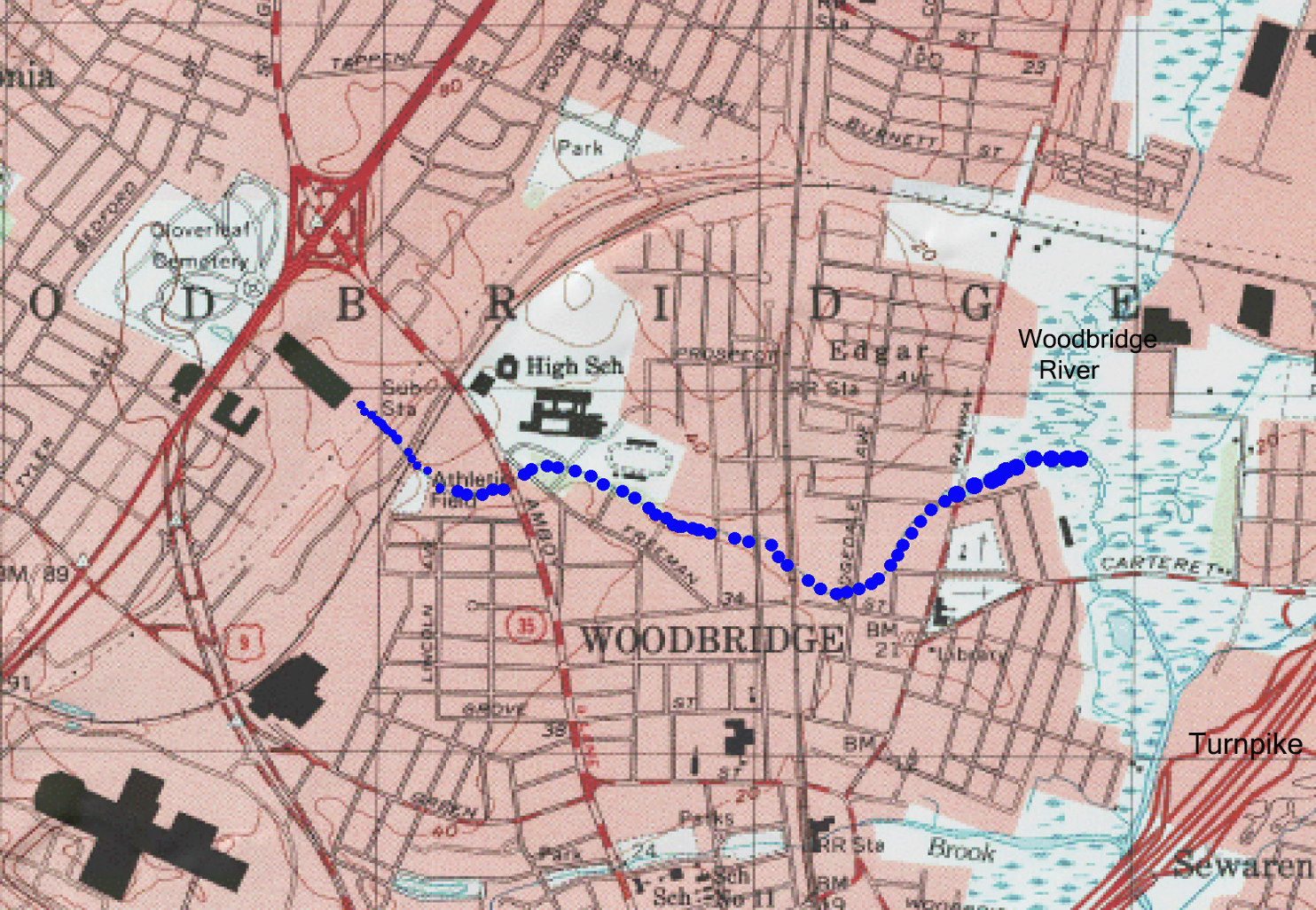
Map of Wedgewood Brook in Woodbridge, New Jersey; geographical markers added

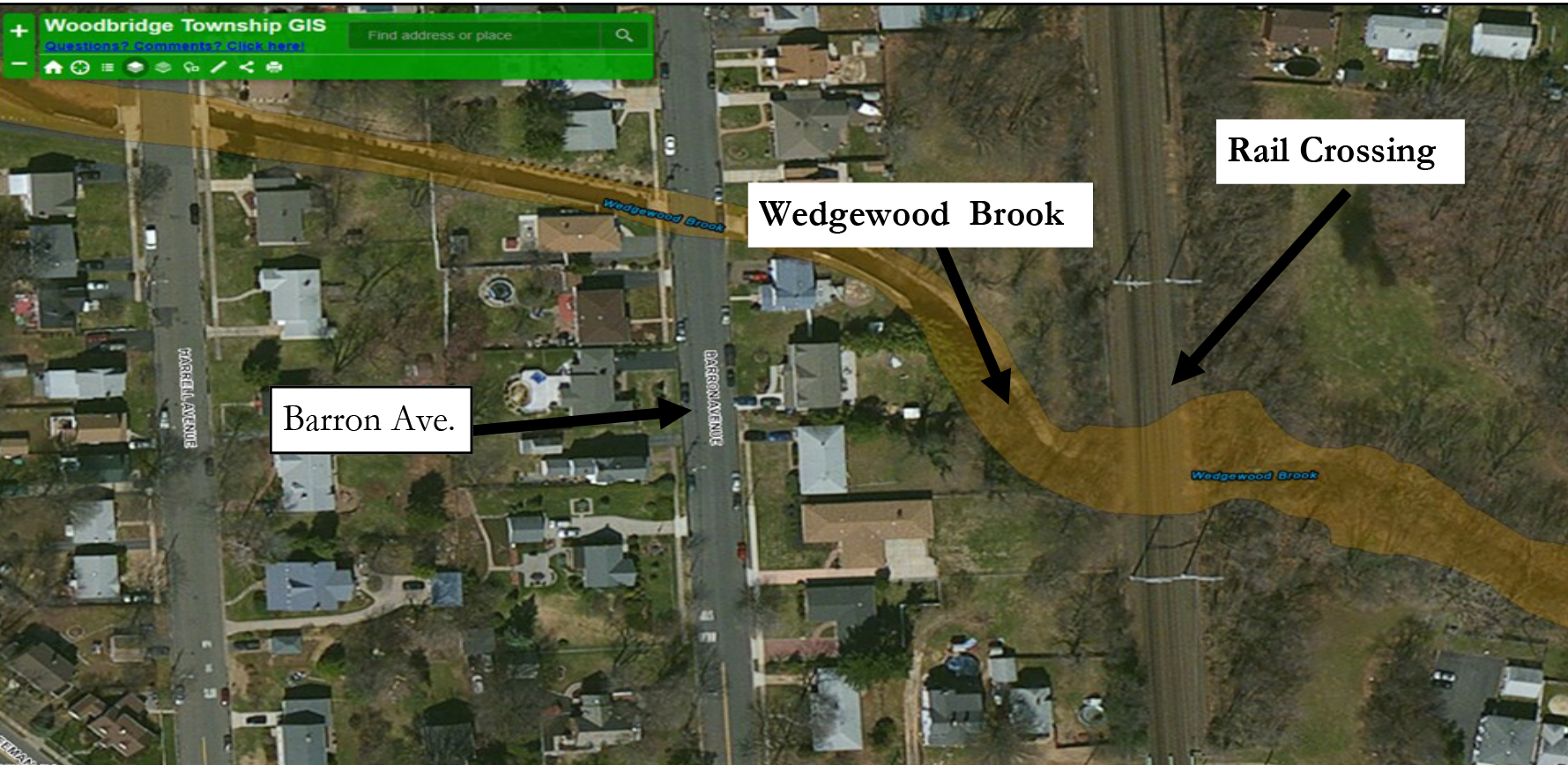
Vulnerable area to fluvial flooding along Wedgewood Brook near railway crossing

The brook arises near Woodbridge High School, flows east, and crosses Wedgewood Avenue, Amboy Avenue and Barron Avenue before entering Woodbridge River in the Woodbridge River Park. Interest in the brook has increased as it has had recurrent flooding in recent years. Woodbridge is bordered on the east by the Arthur Kill, into which the Woodbridge River flows. There is a history of tidal flooding along this river and its tributaries. Woodbridge rivers have been described as having a "high flow, flashy nature;" in addition to tidal flooding, fluvial flooding is also common. The land is relatively impervious, and flooding is exacerbated steep slopes, urban cover and outflow block. The twin culvert size at the railroad crossing just downstream from Barron Avenue is 4x4 feet; this leads to severe upstream flooding. It is estimated that a 100-year flood will put the area under nine feet of water and affect 42 homes. Frequency of flooding has increased over time. Residential areas moved into previous marsh land, decreasing the ability of the land to absorb excess water. Wedgewood Brook is the northern boundary of the area most affected from Hurricane Sandy, Watson-Cramptom. Prior to 2009 this area was zoned for high density residential housing, including the area consisting of wetlands and meadows. When the Sandy came, there was a combination of tidal and fluvial flooding; it was "characterized as a tsunami-like water wall," destroying adjoining homes. After Sandy, using money from the New Jersey Buyout Program, Woodbridge bought out and demolished many residential properties in the flood hazard areas. Woodbridge's actions and plans have been called a "slow motion evacuation from climate change." As people move out of flood hazard areas, they will replaced by a "floodplain forest of native trees, shrubs and grass." In Woodbridge not everybody wants to sell; 2050, when the properties may be under water, seems too far in the future for some. This interferes with the goal of land buffers, entire blocks, between rivers and homes.
