= Thomas Wedgwood IV =

English master potter (1716-1773)

- Born: 1716; Burslem, Staffordshire, England
- Died: 23 February 1773 (aged 56–57); Burslem, Staffordshire, England
- Spouse: Isabell Beech
- Children: 5

Thomas Wedgwood IV (1716 – 23 February 1773) was an English master potter who taught his youngest brother Josiah Wedgwood the trade. Following the death of their father, potter Thomas Wedgwood III, Josiah was apprenticed to his eldest brother Thomas for five years, starting in 1744.

He was the fourth-generation Thomas Wedgwood to live in the Churchyard House until 1756, when he took up residence at the Overhouse, which he inherited from his cousin Katherine Egerton. Prior to that, he had already been leasing the Overhouse Potworks. Although he was not as commercially successful as his brother Josiah, his pottery business achieved more material wealth than previous generations of Wedgwoods.

== Family ==
The eldest son of the potter Thomas Wedgwood III (1685–1739) and his wife Mary Stringer, Wedgwood was also the great-uncle of naturalist Charles Robert Darwin.

He married twice, first to Isabell Beech (1722–1750), who had five children, two of whom died in infancy. His surviving children with Isabell included Thomas Wedgwood V (c. 1745–1787), master potter of the Overhouse, from whom descends the famous ceramic designer Clarice Cliff. After the death of his first wife, he married Jane Richards (1715–1785), with whom he had three children.
