= Rabbittown, St. John's =

Coordinates: 47°33′59″N 52°43′19″W

Rabbittown
- Neighbourhood
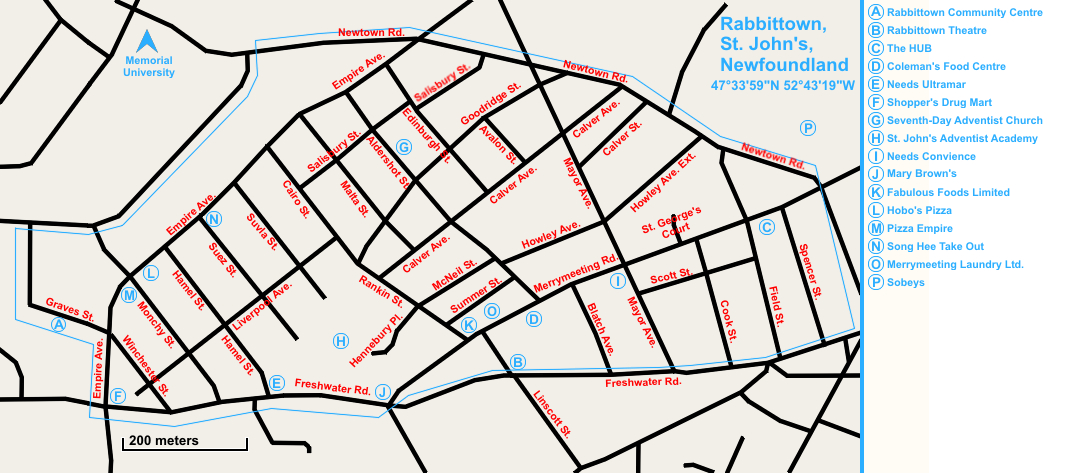
- Map of Rabbittown
- Interactive map of Rabbittown
- Country: Canada
- Province: Newfoundland and Labrador
- City: St. John's
- Ward: 2

Government
  - Administrative body: St. John's City Council
  - Councillor: Brenda Halley

Rabbittown is a neighbourhood in St. John's, Newfoundland and Labrador. It is located near downtown, and is bounded approximately by Empire Avenue, Freshwater Road and Newtown Road.

== History ==
Rabbittown was first developed in the years between World War I and World War II. Many of the street names correspond to locations where the Newfoundland Regiment fought or was stationed during World War I. Merrymeeting Road is the primary traffic and commercial street.

== Boundaries ==
Rabbittown exists primarily on the North ("outer") side of Merrymeeting Road, which was one of the early official boundaries of the City of St. John's. The neighbourhood is home to many students; the neighbourhood is within walking distance of Memorial University of Newfoundland, and contains many relatively low-rent apartments.

== Community ==
Rabbittown is generally a residential area. The area's primary commercial enterprises are two grocery stores (Coleman's and Sobey's), as well as two barber shops and several independent, short-order restaurants. The area is also served by two convenience stores, a drugstore and one gas station.

The Rabbittown Community Centre, which is located at 26 Graves Street, hosts a number of services for different age groups. There is a teen program, an afterschool program, an adults' Rabbittown Community Association neighborhood group. Also on-site are an Employment counselor, a CAP site and a nurse.

The Hub, which refers to itself as "The Physically Disabled Service Centre" is on Merrymeeting Road, in the heart of the neighbourhood.

=== Theatre ===
The Rabbittown Theatre Company was a small theatre company located in the area, at the corner of Merrymeeting Road and Linscott Street. In 2018, St. John's city council approved the conversion of the Rabbittown Theatre guilding to a two-unit residential dwelling.

== Religion ==
The Seventh-day Adventist Church has both a strong history and a current presence in the neighbourhood, with its only St. John's church located on Aldershot Street. The original Adventist manse was at 106 Freshwater Road. That building was eventually replaced with a three-story Adventist Academy (high school) and an Adventist elementary school at 154 Freshwater. When public funding for religious schools was cut in 1997, the two schools were consolidated, and the only Adventist school in the province, St. John's Adventist Academy, is now located at the site of the old elementary school. Due to lack of funding, the school has not operated since 2003, but plans are reported to be in the works to consolidate church and school buildings and reopen the school. The old high school building is now the home of the Rabbittown Theatre Company.

== In popular culture ==
- The neighbourhood was the setting of Rabbittown, a CBC Television comedy pilot which aired as a special in 2006 but was not picked up to series.
- The novel Most Anything You Please by Trudy Morgan-Cole is about three generations of women who own a corner store in Rabbittown.

== Streets in Rabbittown ==
(arranged west to east)

- Empire Avenue
- Graves Street
- Little Street
- Winchester Street
- Freshwater Road
- Liverpool Avenue
- Monchy Street
- Hamel Street
- Suez Street
- Suvla Street
- Cairo Street
- Salisbury Street
- Malta Street
- Aldershot Street
- Goodridge Street
- Rankin Street
- Hennebury Place
- Calver Avenue
- Merrymeeting Road
- Edinburgh Street
- McNeil Street
- Summer Street
- Mayor Avenue
- Newtown Road
- Linscott Street
- Blatch Avenue
- Avalon Street
- Howley Avenue Extension
- Calver Street
- Scott Street
- St. George's Court
- Cook Street
- Feild Street
- Spencer Street

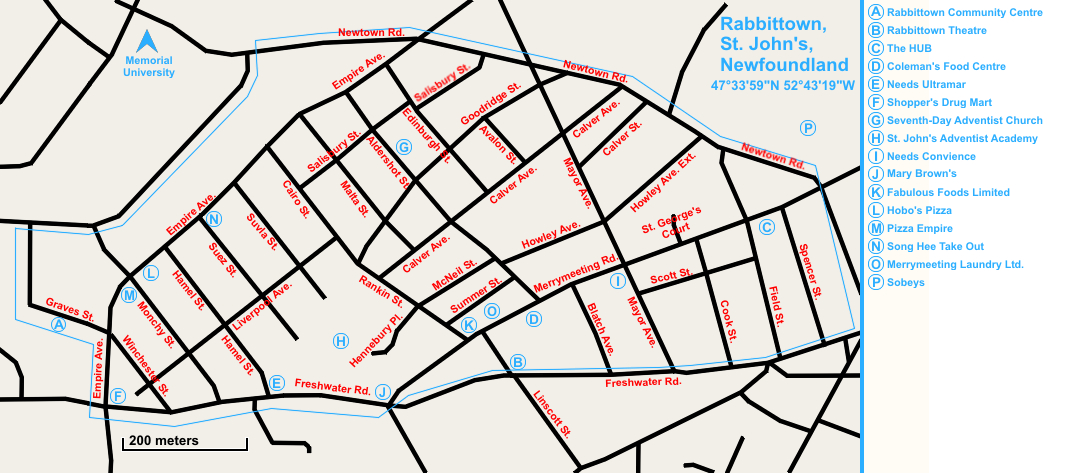
Map of Rabbittown

== See also ==
- Neighbourhoods in St. John's, Newfoundland and Labrador
