= Water Street (St. John's) =

Street in St. John's, Canada

Coordinates: 47°33′45.29″N 52°42′31.13″W

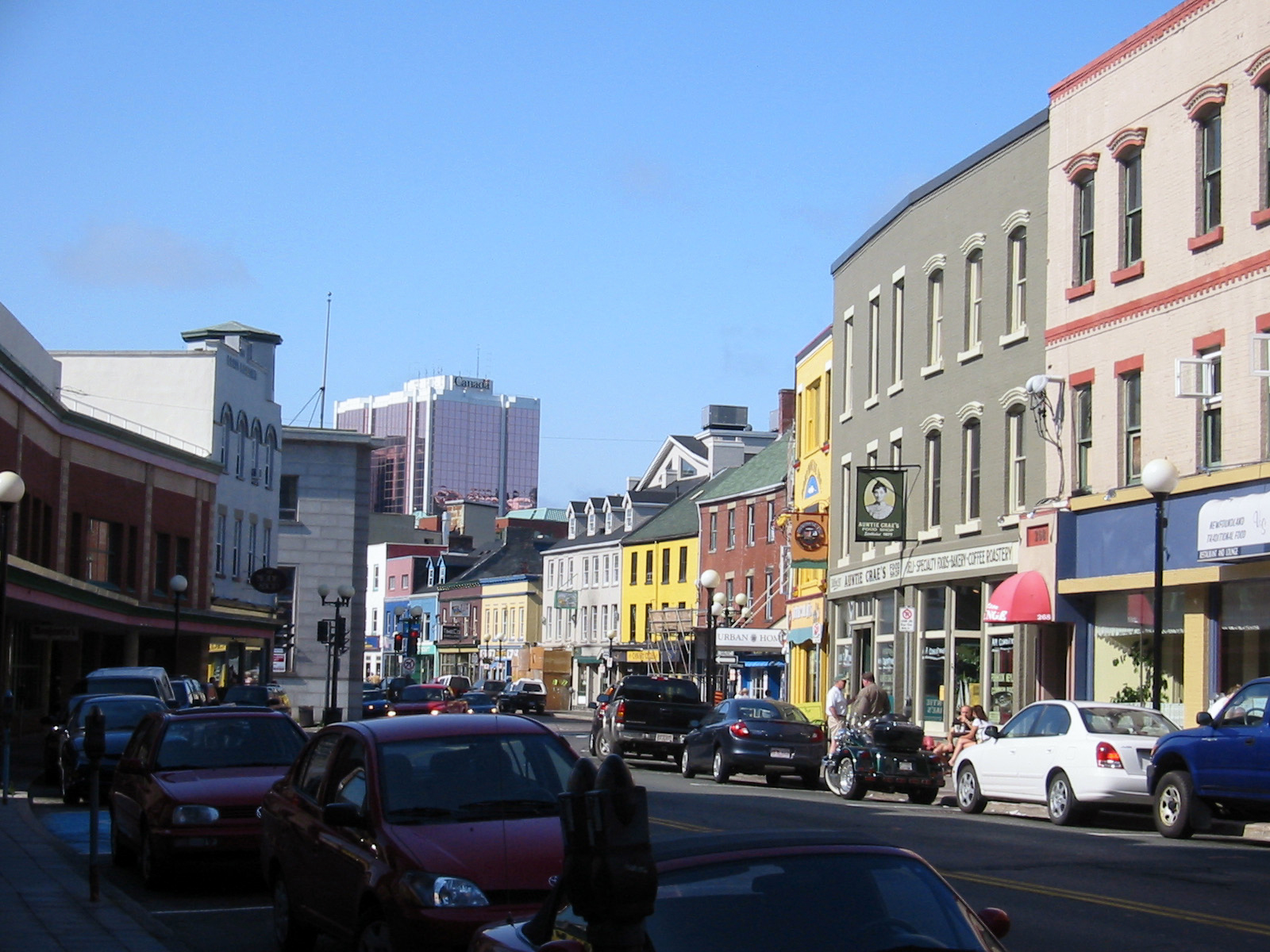
- Interactive map of Water Street
- Location: St. John's
- East end: Temperance Street
- West end: Waterford Bridge Road / Topsail Road

National Historic Site of Canada
- Official name: Water Street Historic District National Historic Site of Canada
- Designated: 1987

Water Street is located in downtown St. John's, Newfoundland and Labrador, Canada. It became a commercial trading outpost for the Basques, French, Spanish, Portuguese, and English. The street now boasts many souvenir shops, restaurants, pubs, and high-end boutiques, as well as other commercial ventures. To this day, the street remains the hub of commercial activity in the city; in 2020, the city implemented a seasonal pedestrian-only section of the road.

== National Historic Site ==
The Water Street Historic District was designated a National Historic Site of Canada in 1987 and comprises a group of commercial structures which are representative of the 19th-century mercantile businesses associated with the Newfoundland fisheries and the Atlantic trade.
