= Rennies Mill Road =

Rennies Mill
- Neighbourhood
- Country: Canada
- Province: Newfoundland and Labrador
- City: St. John's
- Ward: 2

Government
  - Administrative body: St. John's City Council
  - Councilor: Ophelia Ravencroft

Rennies Mill is an east end neighbourhood in St. John's, Newfoundland and Labrador and the "area runs along Rennie’s Mill Road from Military Road ... north one block to its termination at Circular [Road] and includes ... buildings on the west side numbers 21 to 79 and on the east side numbers 12 to 54 and the open spaces around them, extending to their rear property lines".

The road is named after "the Rennie brothers from Scotland [who] opened a flour mill [on what is now called the Rennies River] and bakery in 1835".

== History ==
In the aftermath of the city's Great Fire of 1846, Rennie's Mill Road was developed as a residential area where the prosperous residents sought tranquil and safe accommodations away from the crowded downtown core. It contains a remarkably harmonious and homogeneous grouping of large, wooden homes that are closely associated with individuals prominent in the political, financial and social life of Newfoundland. Given its proximity to government buildings, many prime ministers of the colony have resided along Rennie’s Mill Road (i.e., Alderdice, Goodridge, Lloyd, Morris, Squires, Whiteway). Because the area was developed by many of St. John’s influential and wealthy merchants to house their families, it was also home to those working as their coachmen, gardeners and 'domestics'. This district is a rare intact 19th century example of the planning phenomenon: the residential suburb.

Built in the latter part of the 19th century, a substantial number of these houses were designed in the Second Empire style, which, with its steep mansard roofs, is one of the most characteristic residential forms in St. John's. Another popular style represented is the Queen Anne Revival, which is similar in scale but more varied in form. Many of the original homes remain intact although for some, additions have been built and the property boundaries and the orientation of the house on the property have shifted. It was common at the time for owners to name their property and for the name to vary in written records and over time, e.g., Calvin House or Kelvin House (49 Rennie’s Mill Road). Property names were often used in place of the actual street address.

In 1987, the Historic Sites and Monuments Board of Canada designated the area as "Rennie's Mill Road Historic District" due to the area being a fine example of 19th-century residential streetscape.

== See also ==
- Neighbourhoods in St. John's, Newfoundland and Labrador
