= Downtown St. John's =

- Neighbourhood
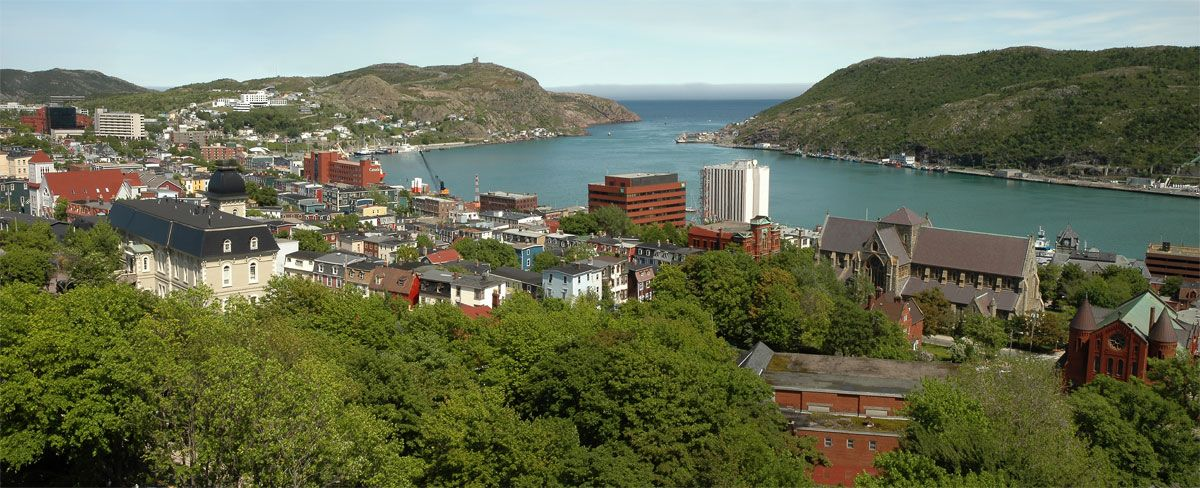
- Looking east towards Downtown St. John's
- Interactive map of Downtown St. John's
- Coordinates: 47.5645°N 52.7089°W
- Country: Canada
- Province: Newfoundland and Labrador
- City: St. John's
- Ward: 2

Government
  - Administrative body: St. John's City Council
  - Councillor: Ophelia Ravencroft

Area
  - Total: 3.0 km^{2} (1.2 sq mi)

Population (2016)
  - Total: 9,431
  - Density: 3,100/km^{2} (8,100/sq mi)
- Website: http://downtownstjohns.com/

Downtown St. John's is the historic core, and central business district of St. John's, Newfoundland and Labrador, Canada. Located north of St. John's harbour, it is the business, entertainment, and tourism centre of the city; it features office buildings, hotels, restaurants, and other services.

== Geography ==
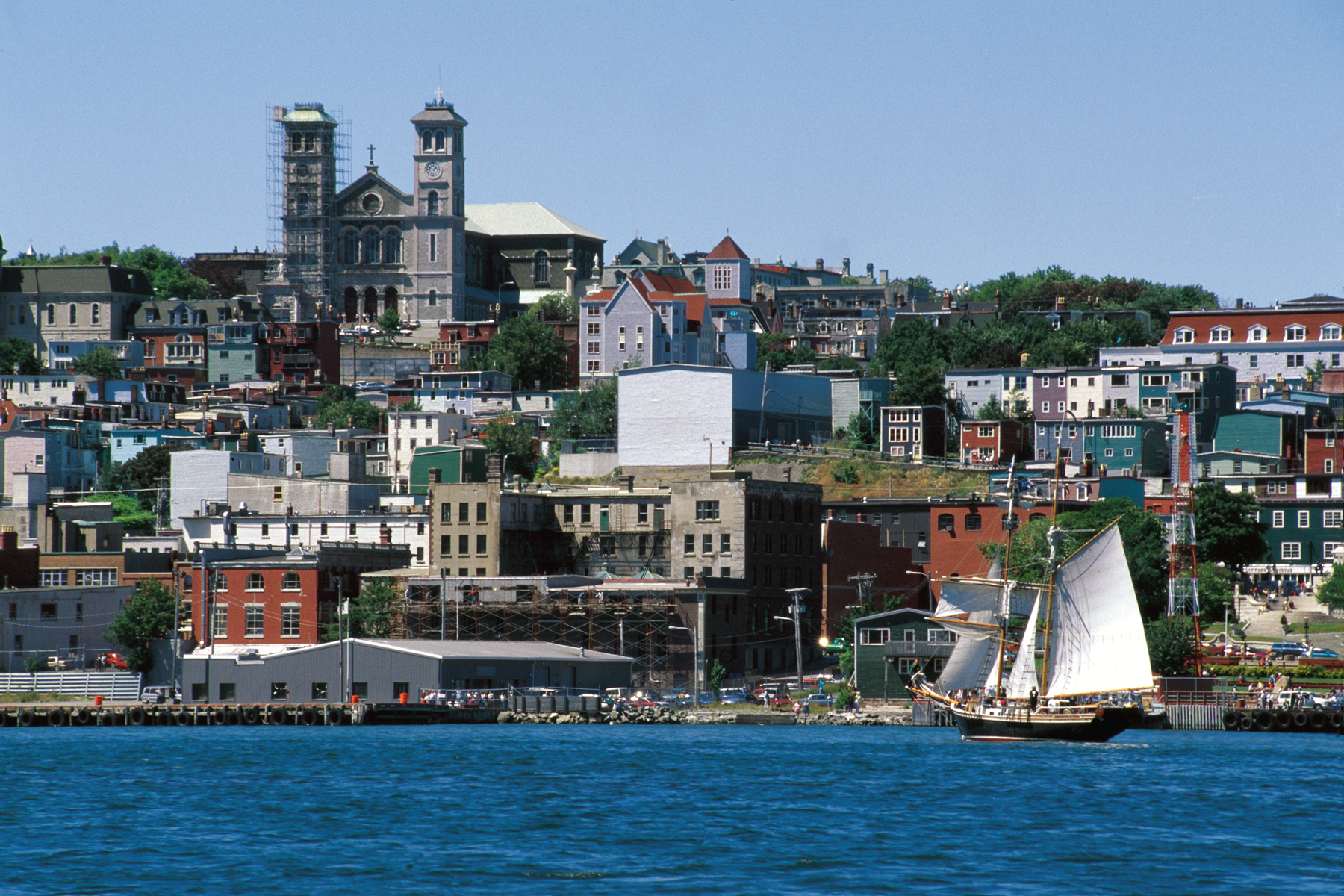
View of Downtown St. John's from the harbour. The downtown is bounded by St. John's Harbour to the east.

In the case of St John's the word "downtown" is ambiguous because it can be both taken literally, and can follow the dictionary. That is the old city is literally downtown, below the ridge along which Military Road runs. However, the word "downtown" usually means "the central business district," and its boundaries in St John's are sometimes extended further north and west.

The historic boundaries of Downtown St John's are usually thought to start at the harbour, and is bounded by Waterford Bridge Road in the west, Cavendish Square/Plymouth Road in the east, and Military Road in the north. A common misconception is also that The Battery is a part of downtown St. John’s. In recent years, the boundaries of the "downtown" (in the generic sense) have been extended further north and west. As such, it now usually takes in Military Road and Lemarchant Road (sometimes only as far as far Merrymeeting Road).

According to Defining Canada’s Downtown Neighbourhoods: 2016 Boundaries, Downtown St. John's is approximately 3 km^{2} (1.2 sq mi) in landmass.

== Culture ==
Downtown St. John's is home to The Rooms, Newfoundland and Labrador's cultural facility, which unites the Provincial Museum, the Provincial Art Gallery and the Provincial Archives all under one roof. The A1C postal code in the downtown area is known to have one of the highest concentrations of artists in Canada.

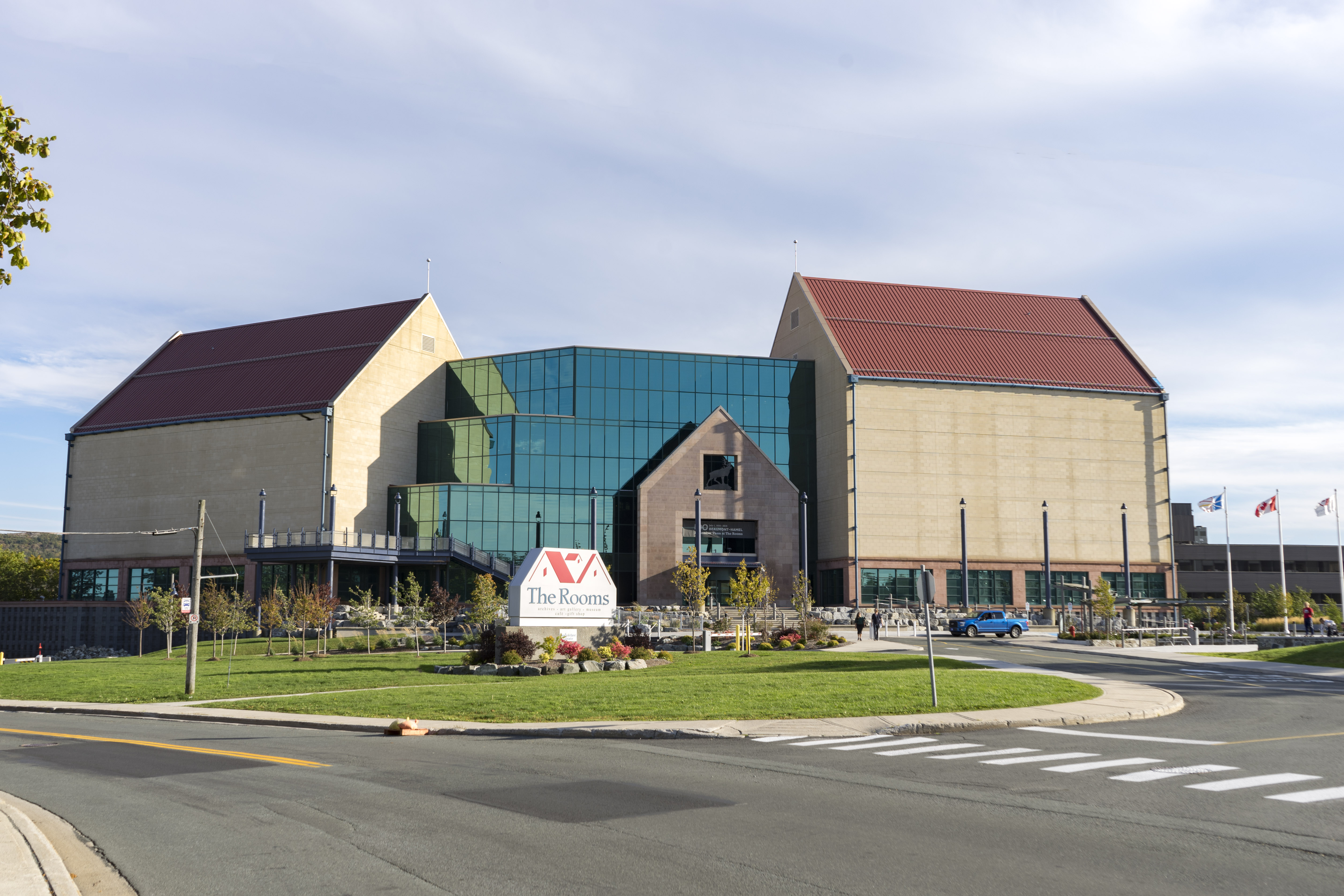
Situated in Downtown St. John's, The Rooms is home to the provincial archives, art gallery, and museum.

=== Entertainment ===
The Mary Brown's Centre is the city's main sports and entertainment centre. Built in 2001, it has been the home of the St. John's Maple Leafs, St. John's Fog Devils, St. John's IceCaps, and most recently, the Newfoundland Growlers and St. John's Edge. It is also a major concert venue. In April 2010 Mile One, as well as George Street, hosted the Juno Awards for the second time.

The Downtown Busker Festival is an annual event held in August. The festival is the only one of its kind in the province and features local talent as well as national and international performers.

==== Nightlife ====
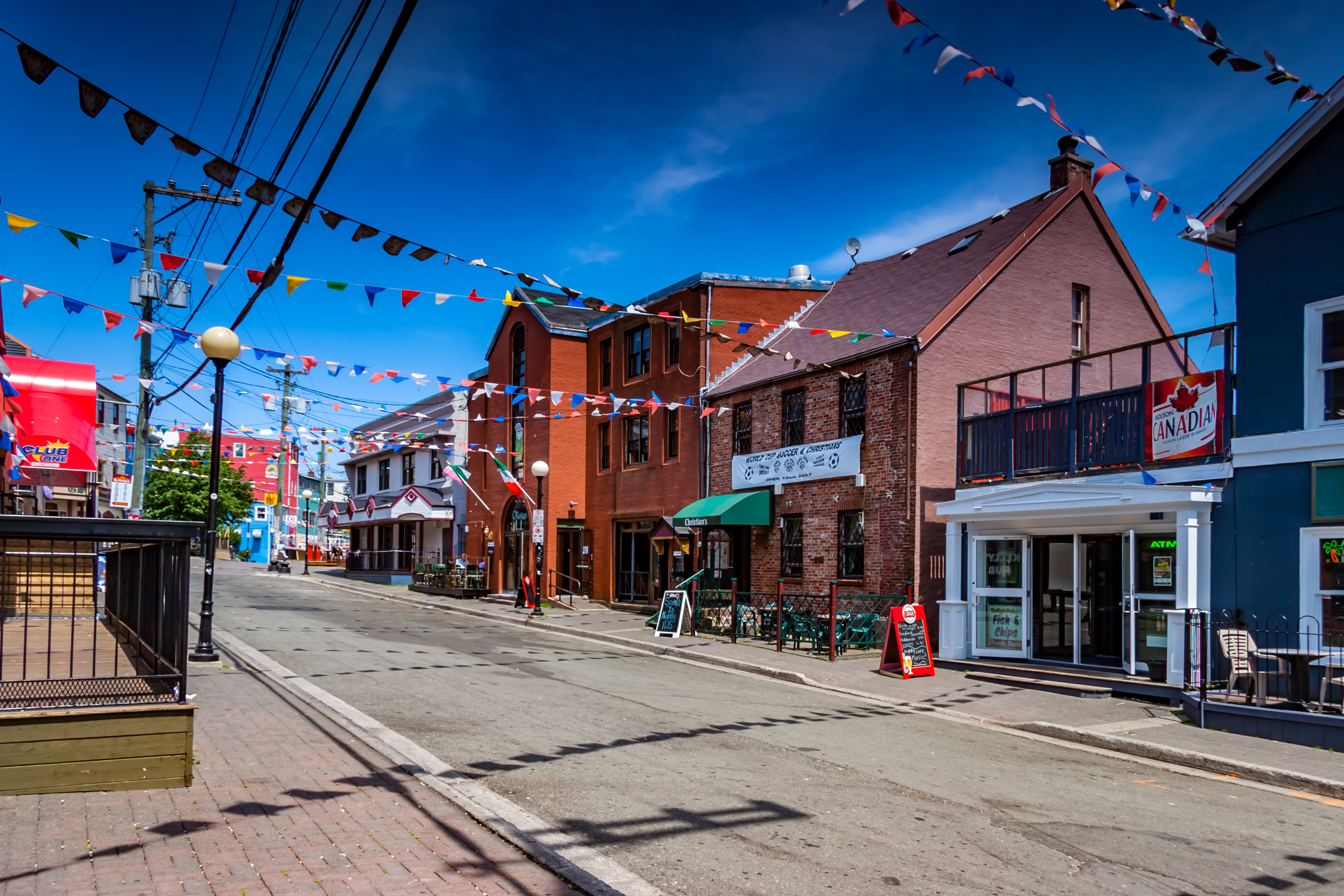
George Street is a small road located in downtown and is the focal point of the city's nightlife.

George Street is located downtown and is the focal point of the city's nightlife. The short street is populated mainly by bars and pubs, which are open later than most others in Canada.

The street is the venue for an annual Mardi Gras celebration in October. However, the largest celebration on George Street is the six-night George Street Festival. The festival occurs at the end of July or early August and typically concludes on the Tuesday night before the Royal St. John's Regatta, which is set for the first Wednesday in August. Over 120,000 people making their way through the streets during the six-day period.

=== Historic buildings ===
St. John's is one of the oldest cities in North America, with numerous historic buildings from the nineteenth century.

== Economy ==
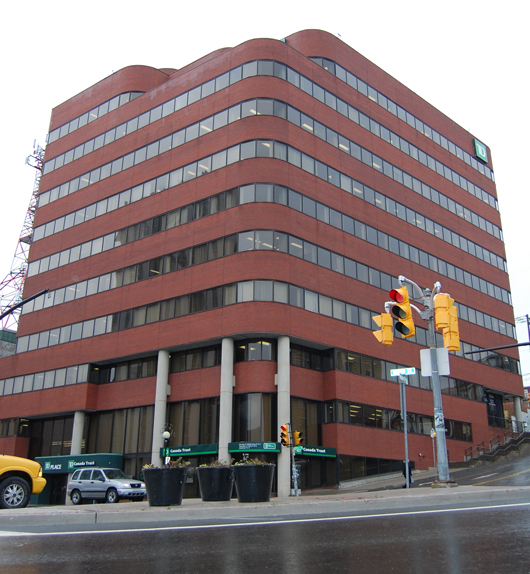
TD Place in Downtown St. John's. All Big Five Canadian banks have operations in St. John's downtown core.

Downtown St. John's is the central business district for the city and is the centre of the oil and gas industry in Eastern Canada. ExxonMobil Canada has its headquarters in the Cabot Building on New Gower Street, as well Chevron, Statoil and Suncor Energy along with other oil and gas companies have major operations downtown. Fortis Inc. have their headquarters in the Fortis Building on Water Street; they also own and operate several of the office buildings and hotels downtown. All of the Big Five Canadian banks have operations in the downtown core as well.

=== Hotels ===
- Courtyard by Marriott St. John's
- Delta St. John's Hotel
- Sheraton Hotel Newfoundland

=== Retail ===
Downtown has many small stores including unique specialty stores and fashionable clothing boutiques for men and women. There are art galleries, bookstores, and music stores featuring the work of local artists scattered throughout the downtown.

== Government ==
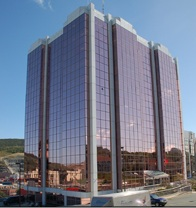
Departments and agencies of the Government of Canada maintain offices in several buildings in the downtown core, such as the John Cabot Building.

=== Municipal ===
Downtown St. John's is the home of the St. John's City Council Chamber at city hall. Offices for the mayor, city councillors, and additional staff are also located in city hall.

=== Federal ===
The Newfoundland and Labrador office for the regional federal minister is located downtown. Further, many Federal Government departments and agencies are also located downtown in different buildings. These include the Sir Humphrey Gilbert Building and the John Cabot Building.

== Demographic ==
From the report from Statistics Canada named Defining Canada’s Downtown Neighbourhoods: 2016 Boundaries, Downtown St. John's has approximately 9,431 people living within its boundaries. The population density is approximately 31 people per hectare.

== See also ==
- St. John's
- Architecture of St. John's, Newfoundland and Labrador
- Neighbourhoods in St. John's, Newfoundland and Labrador
- Newfoundland and Labrador
