= Kilautiup Songuninga =

Inuit drum dancing group

- Origin: St. John's, Newfoundland and Labrador, Canada
- Genres: Inuit throat singing
- Years active: 2006; 20 years ago
- Website: www.facebook.com/p/Kilautiup-Songuninga-61571633946423/

External videos
- Women at heart of Inuit drum dance revival, CBC Indigenous, 2025
- “Kilautiup Sonuninga – Keeping a Culture Alive.”, Research Centre for the Study of Music, Media, and Place, Memorial University, 2009.

Kilautiup Songuninga (founded 2006) is an Inuit-led drum dancing and throat singing group based in St. John's, Newfoundland and Labrador, Canada that works to recover traditional Inuit music and culture. Their name means "strength of the drum."

== History ==
Kilautiup Songuninga was founded in 2006, as part of preparations for the inauguration of Nunatsiavut as a regional ethnic government for Newfoundland and Labrador. The group's first public performance was at “Celebrating Nunatsiavut,” an event held in April 2006 at The Rooms, an art gallery and museum in St. John's. Prior to the event, Inuit artists and musician Stanley Nochasak, Sophie Angnatok, Josephine Obed, and Solomon Semigak had been working with a non-Inuk ethnomusicologist, Mary Piercey, to learn traditional Inuit songs.

Colleen Shea at The Rooms approached them about performing, and Simon Kohmeister from Labrador created the group's first qilaut (Inuit frame drum). The St. John’s Native Friendship Centre provided rehearsal space.

Kilautiup Songuninga was the first Inuit drum dancing and throat singing group to be formed in St. John's, Newfoundland and Labrador, Canada.

Since then, the group has been made up predominantly of Labrador Inuit living in St. John's. One of the founders, Sophie Agnatok, grew up in Nain, Newfoundland and Labrador. Her grandmother, who brought her up, was a throat singer but did not pass on her traditional knowledge. Another founder was Solomon Semigak, who died in 2024. His niece, Sophie Semigak, joined the group in 2025. As of 2025 members included Letia Kalluk, Makaela Blake, Ashley Dicker, Danny Pottle, Sophie Agnatok and Sophie Semigak.

The group gathers songs and stories and revives Inuit traditions of drum dancing and throat singing. These activities were banned by missionaries of the Moravian church, which entered North America from Germany and Britain in the mid-1700s. Traditional forms of music and culture were hidden or lost as a result. Some elements of tradition were later incorporated into Western music by Inuit. A movement for the active recovery of traditional musical and cultural forms began in the 1980s. Kilautiup Songuninga has performed at events such as the festivities at Government House in St. John's to commemorate the coronation of King Charles III in 2023.
