= Qilaut =

Inuit frame drum

Drum dancing, Gjoa Haven, Nunavut, Canada, 2019

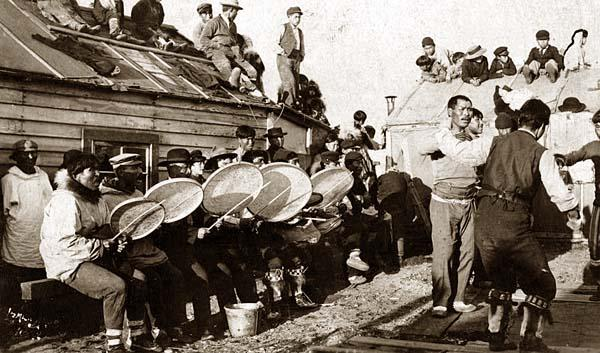
Drummers at a dance near Nome in 1900.

The qilaut (Inuit language: "that by means of which the spirits are called up", syllabic: ᕿᓚᐅᑦ), (Inuinnaqtun: qilaun or qilauti or Greenlandic: qilaat ) is a type of frame drum native to the Inuit cultures of the Arctic.

The drum, used in Inuit music, is distinctive in that it has a handle and is made of caribou skin, which is not particularly resonant, giving it a dull, rumbling sound.

The frame of the drum with a stick, the qatuk (katuun / katuut / katuuti) and the act of beating the drum is called katuktuq. Most dances, qilaujjaqtuq, also involve singing, known as ingiuqtuq or pihiq, and the dancer is called qilaujjaqtuq.

Nunavut, Canada holds a songwriting contest, known as Qilaut, every year to cherish Inuktut music.

== See also ==
- Kilautiup Songuninga
