= St. John's, Newfoundland and Labrador =

Capital and largest city of Newfoundland and Labrador, Canada

St. John's
- City and provincial capital
- City of St. John's
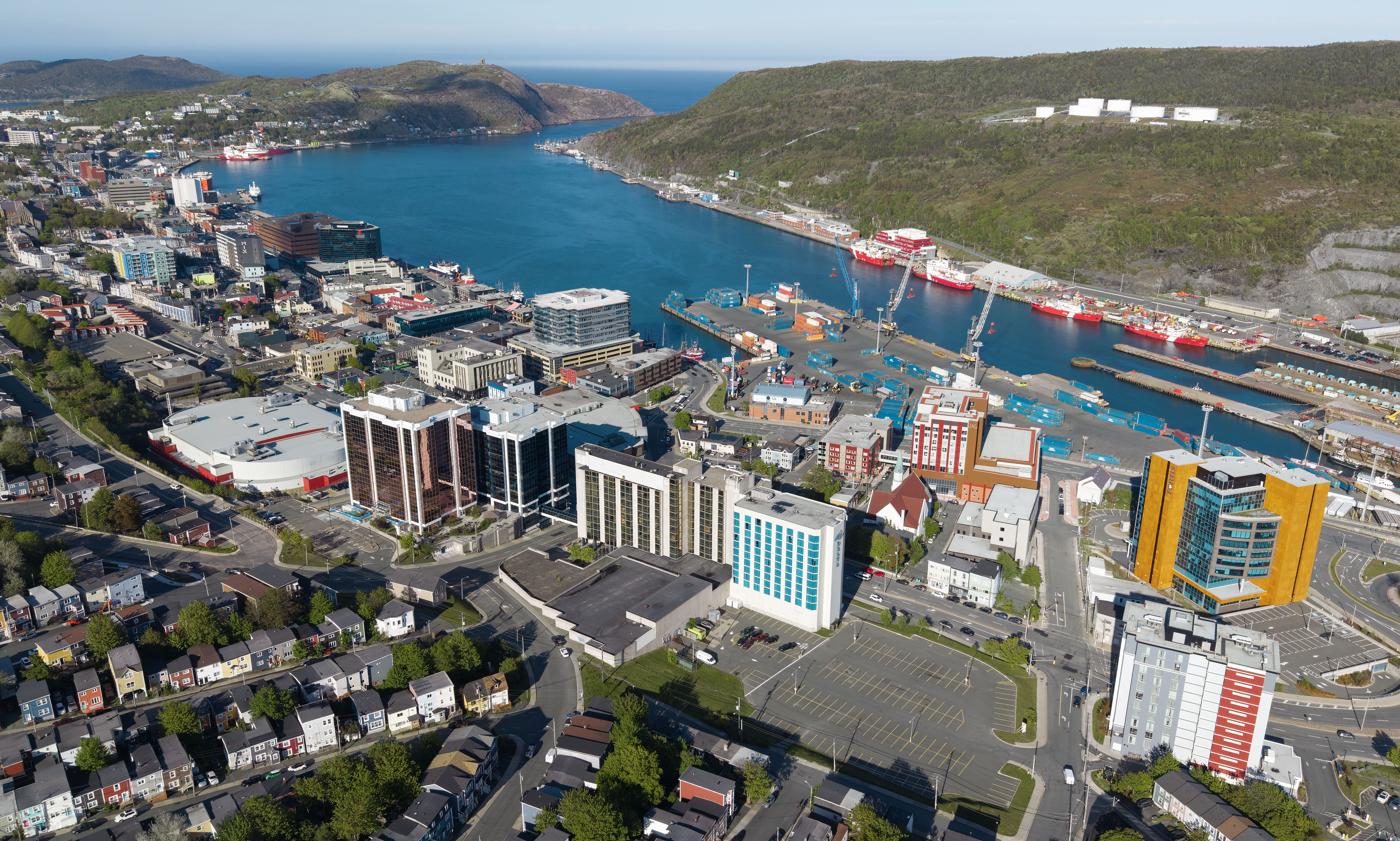
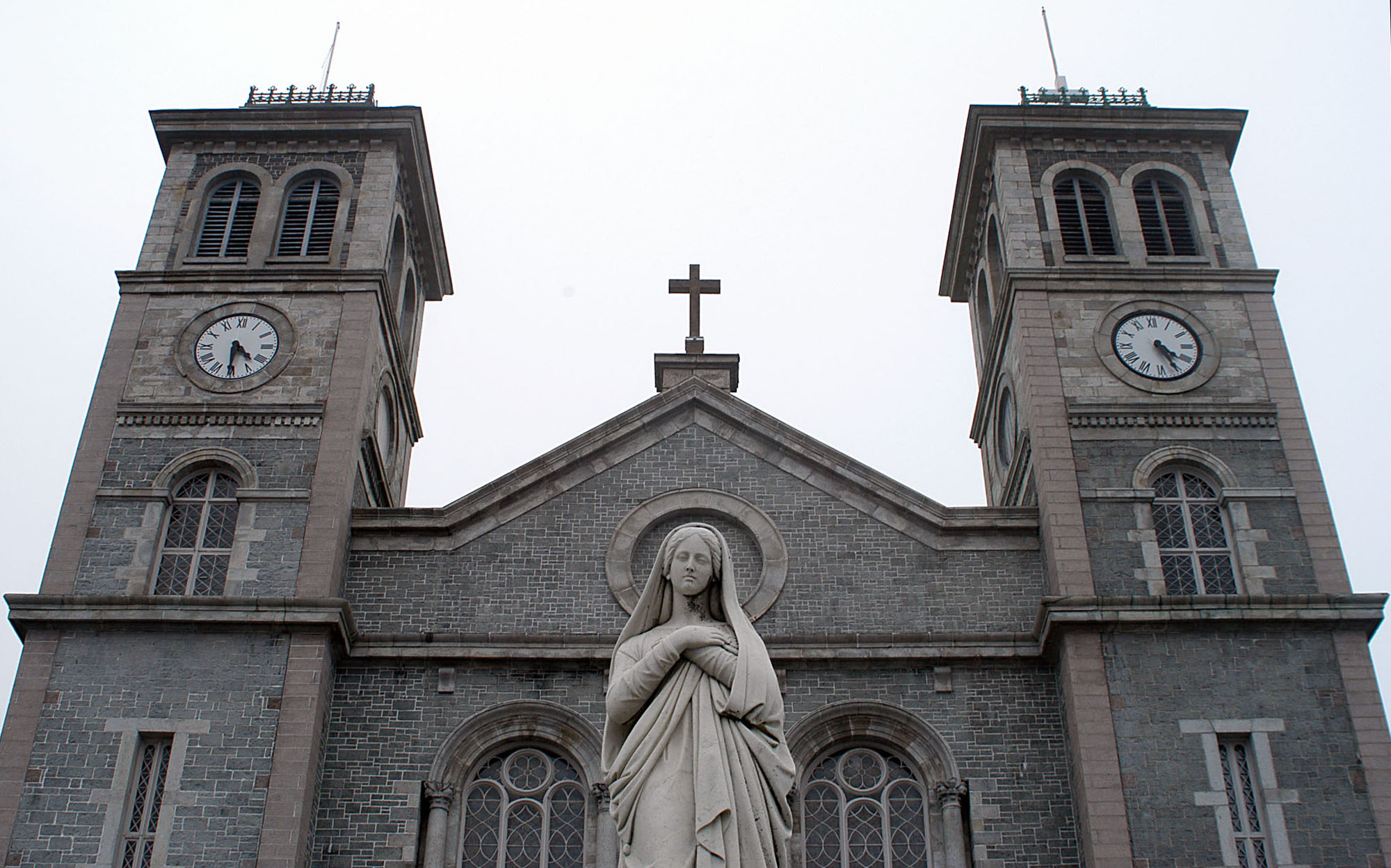
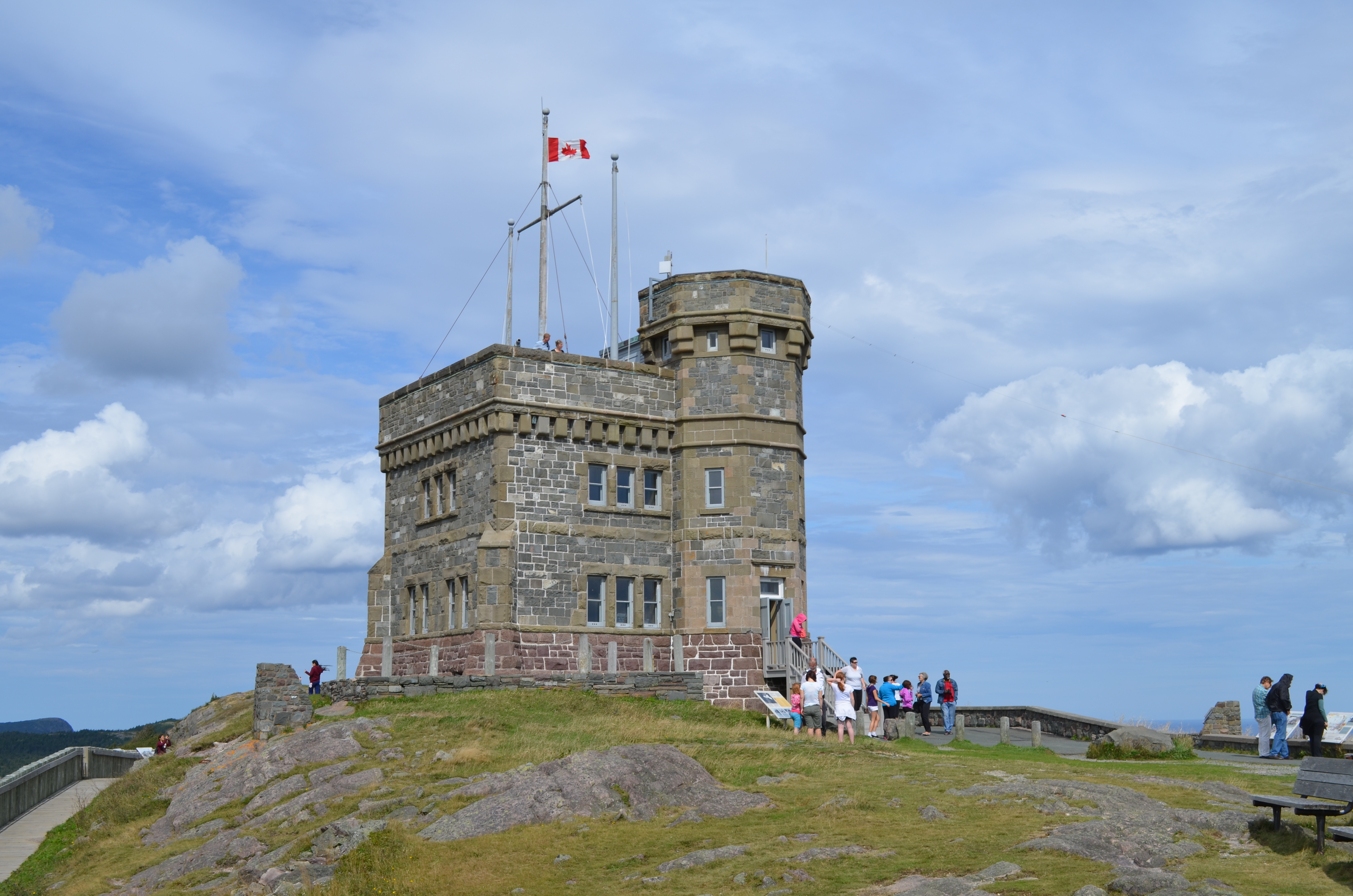
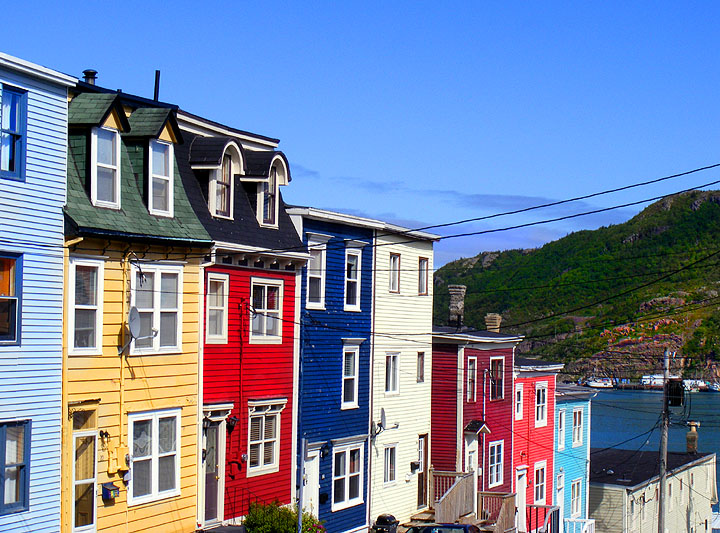
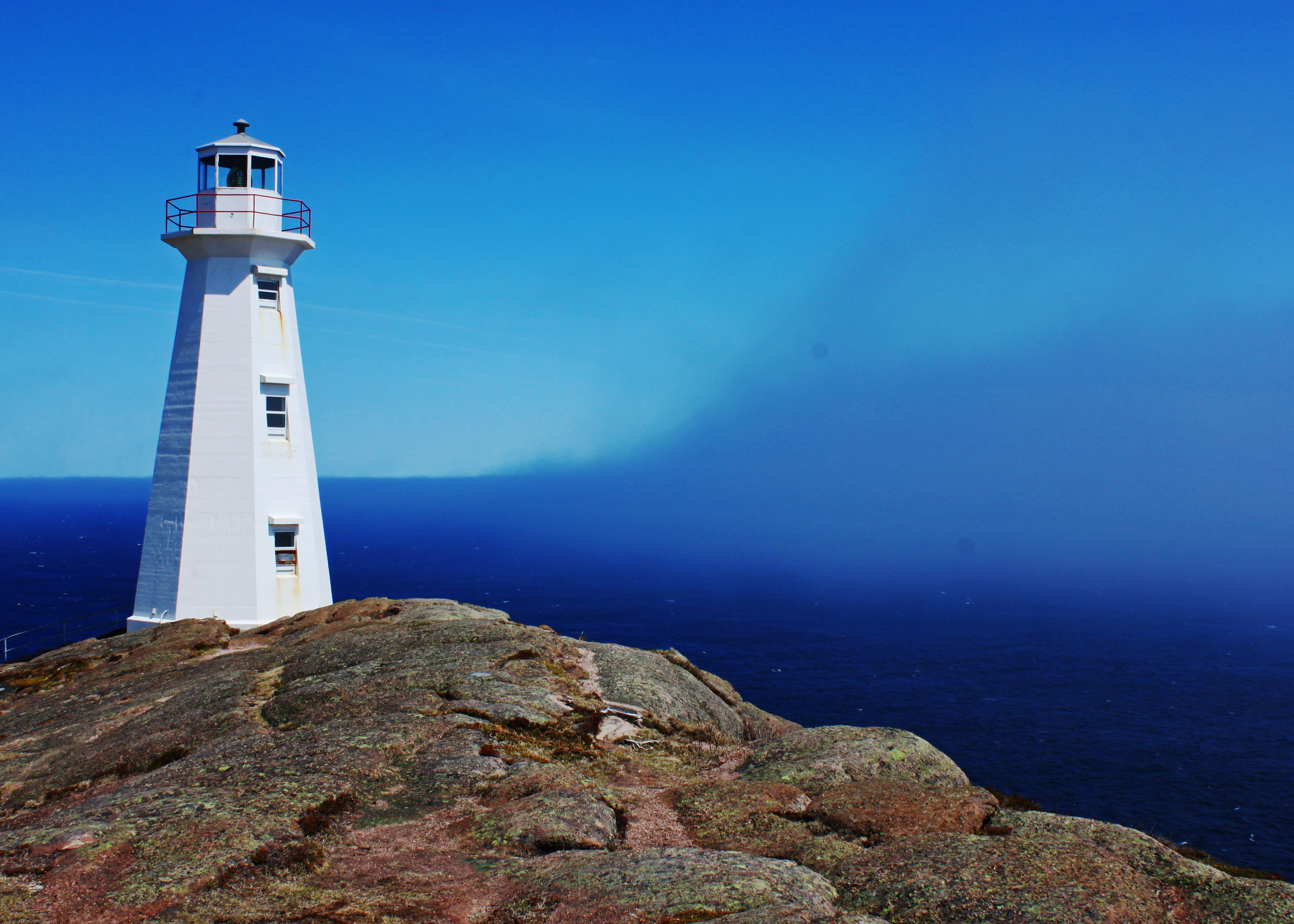
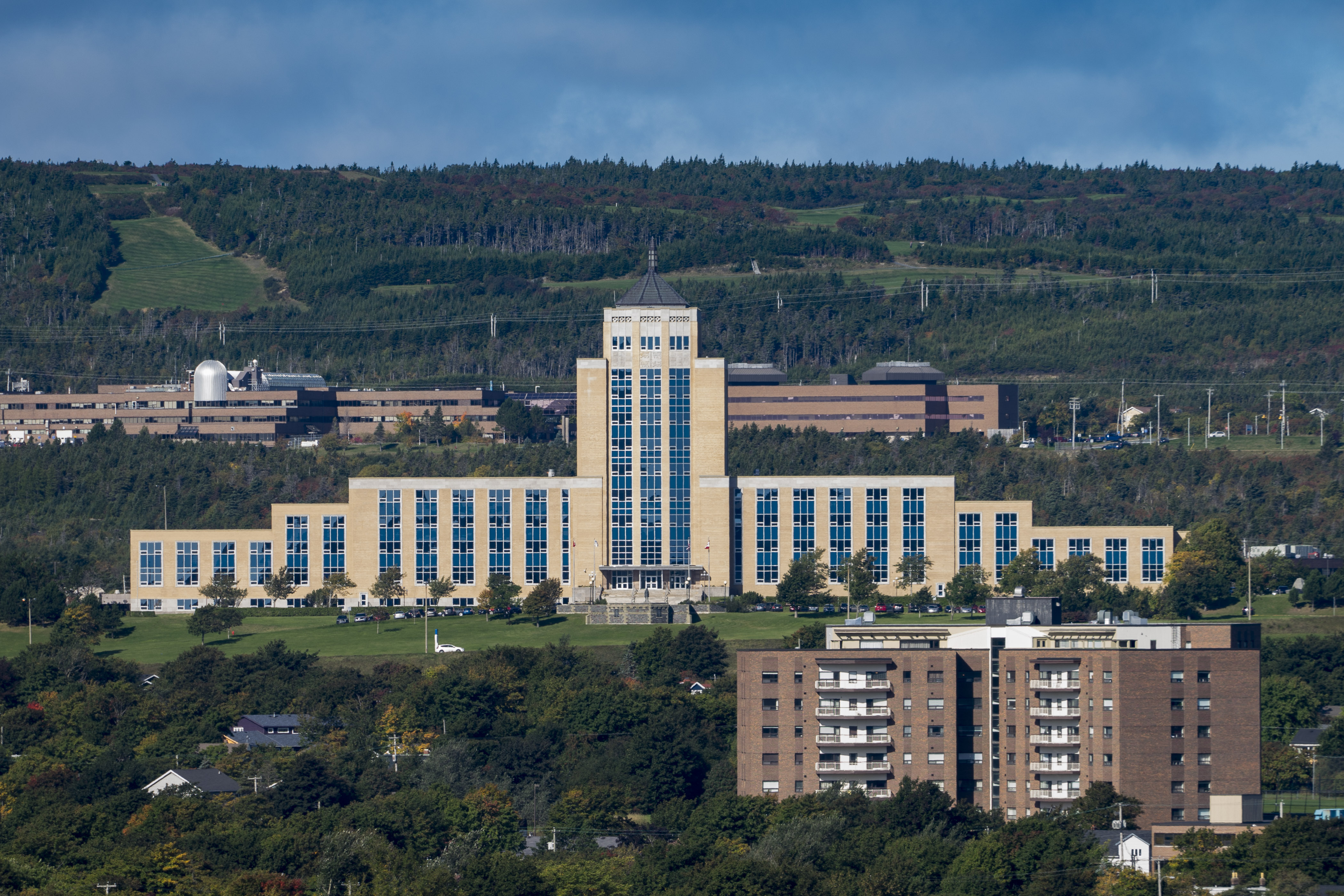
- Downtown St. John's Basilica of St. John the Baptist Cabot Tower Row Houses Cape Spear Lighthouse Newfoundland and Labrador Confederation Building

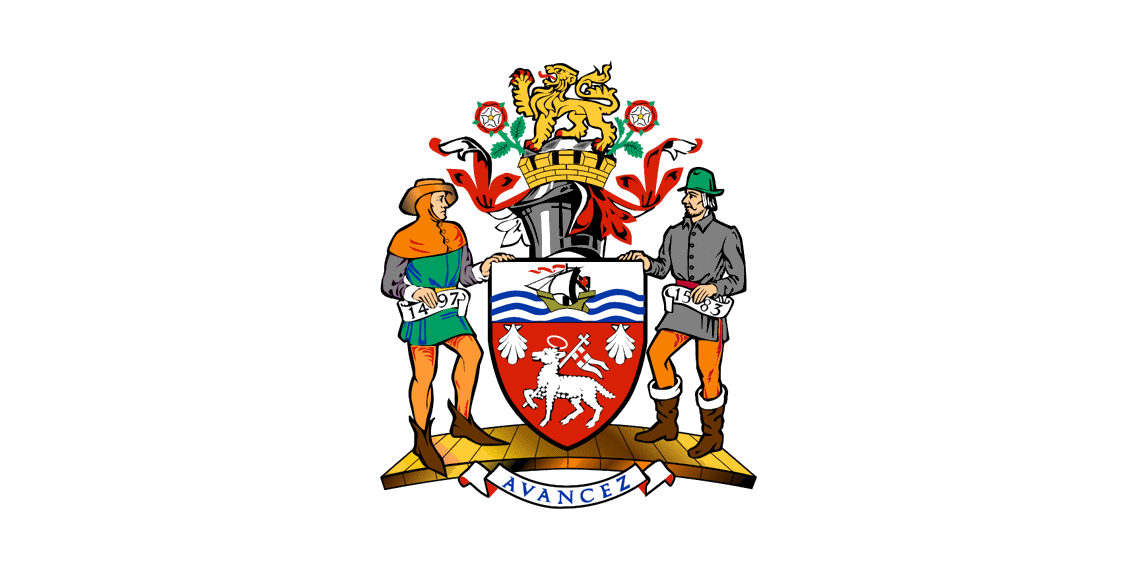
- Flag Coat of arms Logo
- Motto: Avancez (English: "Go forward")
- Location within Newfoundland and Labrador Location within Canada
- Coordinates: 47°33′41″N 52°42′43″W
- Country: Canada
- Province: Newfoundland and Labrador
- Census division: 1
- Historic countries: Kingdom of England; Kingdom of Great Britain; United Kingdom of Great Britain and Ireland; Dominion of Newfoundland
- Discovered: 24 June 1497 (Not as an established settlement, but as fishing grounds)
- Established: 5 August 1583 by Royal Charter of Queen Elizabeth I
- Incorporated: 1 May 1888
- Named for: Nativity of John the Baptist

Government
  - Type: City Council
  - Mayor: Danny Breen
  - Governing body: St. John's City Council
  - MPs: List of MPs: Paul Connors (L); Tom Osborne (L); Joanne Thompson (L)
  - MHAs: List of MHAs: Sheilagh O'Leary (NDP); Keith White (LIB); Bernard Davis (LIB); Jim Dinn (NDP); John Hogan (LIB); Paul Lane (IND); Loyola O'Driscoll (PC); Jamie Korab (LIB); Sarah Stoodley (LIB)

Area (2021)
  - City and provincial capital: 446.02 km^{2} (172.21 sq mi)
  - Urban: 178.0 km^{2} (68.7 sq mi)
  - Metro: 931.56 km^{2} (359.68 sq mi)
- Elevation: 0–192 m (0–630 ft)

Population (2021 census)
  - City and provincial capital: 110,525
  - Density: 247.8/km^{2} (642/sq mi)
  - Urban: 185,565
  - Urban density: 1,042.5/km^{2} (2,700/sq mi)
  - Metro: 212,579
  - Metro density: 228.2/km^{2} (591/sq mi)
- 20th Largest metropolitan area in Canada
- Time zone: UTC−03:30 (NST)
  - Summer (DST): UTC−02:30 (NDT)
- Postal code: A1A–A1H, A1S
- Area code: 709
- NTS Map: 1N10 St. John's
- GNBC Code: ABEFS
- Total Dwellings: 54,067 (2021)
- Median total household income: $75,000 CAD (2020)
- GDP (St. John's CMA): CA$13.2 billion (2016)
- GDP per capita (St. John's CMA): CA$63,965 (2016)
- Website: stjohns.ca

St. John's is the capital and largest city of the Canadian province of Newfoundland and Labrador. It is located on the eastern tip of the Avalon Peninsula on the island of Newfoundland. The city spans 446.04 square kilometres (172.22 sq mi) and is the easternmost city in North America (excluding Greenland).

Its name has been attributed to the belief that John Cabot sailed into the harbour on the Nativity of John the Baptist in 1497, although it is most likely a legend that came with British settlement. Following John Cabot's 1497 landfall under the English crown—widely recognized as the first documented post-Norse European landing on mainland North America—St. John's Harbour rapidly developed into a bustling transatlantic fishing village. By the mid-16th century, the harbour maintained a continuous, year-round European presence, as overwintering crews remained behind to guard and maintain fishing stages, wharves, boats, and equipment left at the end of the seasonal migratory cod fishery. Operating under the informal governance of the Fishing Admirals along what is now Water Street and the harbourfront, this continuous habitation and commercial infrastructure predated the 1607 establishment of Jamestown, Virginia, by several decades. Indicated as São João on a Portuguese map from 1519, it is one of the oldest cities in North America. It was officially incorporated as a city in 1888. With a metropolitan population of approximately 239,316 (as of 16 January 2025), the St. John's Metropolitan Area is Canada's 22nd-largest metropolitan area and the second-largest Census Metropolitan Area (CMA) in Atlantic Canada, after Halifax, Nova Scotia.

The city has a rich history, having played a role in the Seven Years' War, the American Revolutionary War, and the War of 1812. Italian inventor Guglielmo Marconi received the first transatlantic wireless signal in St. John's. Its history and culture have made it into an important tourist destination. St. John's was referred to as Baile Sheáin (Johnstown), in the poetry of Donnchadh Ruadh Mac Conmara (1715–1810), and among speakers of the Irish language in Newfoundland.

== History ==
=== Early history (1500–1799) ===
St. John's was used by fishermen setting up seasonal camps in the early 1500s. Sebastian Cabot declared in a handwritten Latin text in his original 1545 map that St. John's earned its name when he and his father, the Venetian explorer John Cabot, in the service of England, became the first Europeans to sail into the harbour, on the morning of 24 June 1494 (per British and French historians, in 1497), the feast day of Saint John the Baptist. However, the locations of Cabot's landfalls are disputed. A series of expeditions to St. John's by Portuguese from the Azores took place in the early 16th century, and by 1540, French, Spanish and Portuguese ships crossed the Atlantic annually to fish the waters off the Avalon Peninsula. In the Basque Country, it is a common belief the name of St. John's was given by Basque fishermen because the bay of St. John's is very similar to the Bay of Pasaia in the Basque Country, where one of the fishing towns is called St. John (in Spanish, San Juan, and in Basque, Donibane).

The earliest record of the location appears as São João on a Portuguese map by Pedro Reinel in 1519. When the English mariner John Rut visited St. John's in 1527, he found Norman, Breton and Portuguese ships in the harbour. On 3 August 1527, Rut wrote a letter to King Henry VIII on the findings of his voyage to North America; this was the first known letter sent from North America. St. Jehan is shown on Nicolas Desliens's world map of 1541, and San Joham is found in João Freire's Atlas of 1546.

On 5 August 1583, an English Sea Dog, Sir Humphrey Gilbert, claimed the area as England's first overseas colony under Royal Charter of Queen Elizabeth I. There was no permanent population, however, and Gilbert was lost at sea during his return voyage, thereby ending any immediate plans for settlement.

Bernard Drake's Newfoundland Expedition in 1585 landed at Saint John's, re-establishing England's claim on the area. St. John's became a base for his operations, where his ships gathered supplies and fresh water. This expedition virtually wiped out the Spanish and Portuguese fishing industries in the area, and so set the stage for subsequent English and French influence in the region.

By 1620, the fishermen of England's West Country controlled most of Newfoundland's east coast. In 1627, William Payne, called St. John's "the principal prime and chief lot in all the whole country".

Sometime after 1630, the town of St. John's was established as a permanent community. Before this, English fishermen were expressly forbidden by the English government, at the urging of the West Country fishing industry, to establish permanent settlements along the English-controlled coast.

The population grew slowly in the 17th century: St. John's was Newfoundland's largest settlement when English naval officers began to take censuses around 1675. The population grew in the summers with the arrival of migratory fishermen. In 1680, fishing ships (mostly from South Devon) set up fishing rooms at St. John's, bringing hundreds of Irish men into the port to operate inshore fishing boats.

The town's first significant defences were likely erected due to commercial interests, following the temporary seizure of St. John's by the Dutch admiral Michiel de Ruyter in June 1665.

The inhabitants fended off a second Dutch attack in 1673, when it was defended by Christopher Martin, an English merchant captain. Martin landed six cannons from his vessel, Elias Andrews, and constructed an earthen breastwork and battery near Chain Rock commanding the Narrows leading into the harbour. With 23 men, Martin beat off an attack by three Dutch warships. The English government planned to expand these fortifications (Fort William) in around 1689, but construction did not begin until after the French admiral Pierre Le Moyne d'Iberville captured and destroyed the town in the Avalon Peninsula Campaign (1696). When 1500 English reinforcements arrived in late 1697, they found rubble where the town and fortifications had stood.

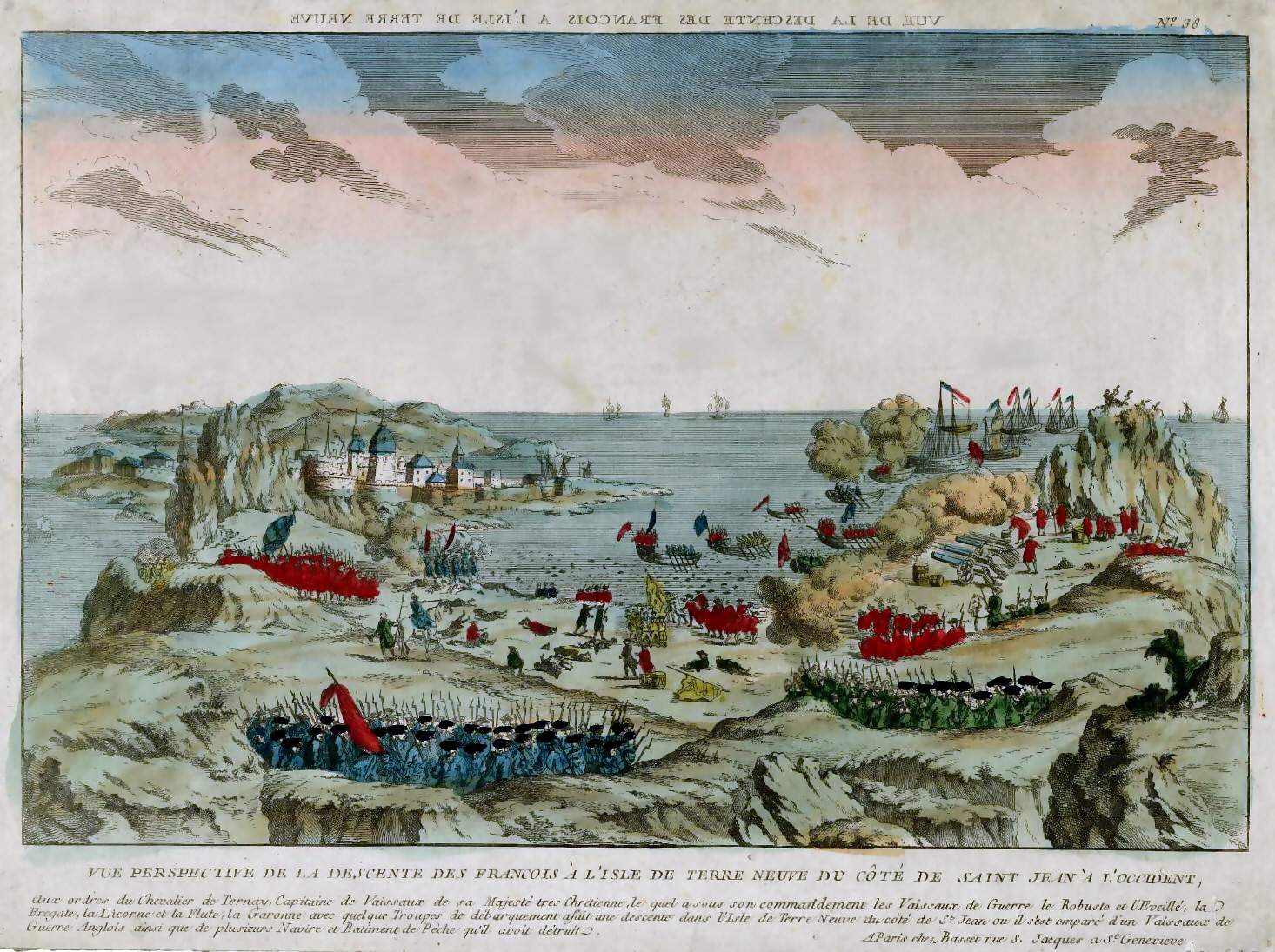
In 1762, the British and French fought in the Battle of Signal Hill. It was the last battle of the North American theatre in the Seven Years' War.

The French attacked St. John's again in 1705 (Siege of St. John's), and captured it in 1708 (Battle of St. John's), devastating civilian structures with fire on each instance. The harbour remained fortified through most of the 18th and 19th centuries. The final battle of the Seven Years' War in North America (known as the French and Indian War in the US) was fought in 1762, in St. John's. Following a surprise capture of the town by the French early in the year, the British responded and, at the Battle of Signal Hill, the French surrendered St. John's to British forces under the command of Colonel William Amherst.

In the late 1700s, Fort Amherst and Fort Waldegrave were built to defend the harbour entrance.

==== The oldest European settlement in Anglophone North America controversy ====
There has been some controversy regarding which European settlement is the oldest in Anglophone North America. As mentioned above, while English fishermen had set up seasonal camps in St. John's in the 16th century, they were expressly forbidden by the English government, at the urging of the West Country fishing industry, to establish permanent settlements along the English-controlled coast. As a result, the town of St. John's was not established as a permanent community until after the 1630s. With respect to the oldest surviving permanent English settlements in North America, it was preceded by Jamestown, Virginia (1607), the Cuper's Cove colony at Cupids in Newfoundland (1610), St. George's, Bermuda (1612), and the Bristol's Hope colony at Harbour Grace in Newfoundland (1618). Each of these English settlements were far later than other European settlements in North America, such as St. Augustine, Florida established by Spain in 1565.

=== Modern history (1800–present) ===
On 24 April 1800, the "United Irish Uprising" occurred when 19 Irish soldiers who were part of the British garrison stationed in Newfoundland mutinied. The mutineers, who were suspected to be members of the Society of United Irishmen, fled to the countryside after the mutiny failed, and were apprehended in a matter of weeks and court-martialled. Of the 17 mutineers captured, 8 were executed, 4 were let go while 5 were sentenced to penal transportation.

The 18th century saw major changes in Newfoundland: population growth, beginnings of government, establishment of churches, reinforcement of commercial ties with North America and development of the seal, salmon and Grand Banks fisheries. St. John's population grew slowly. Although it was primarily a fishing station, it was also a garrison, a centre of government and a commercial hub. St. John's served as a naval base during the American Revolutionary War and the War of 1812.

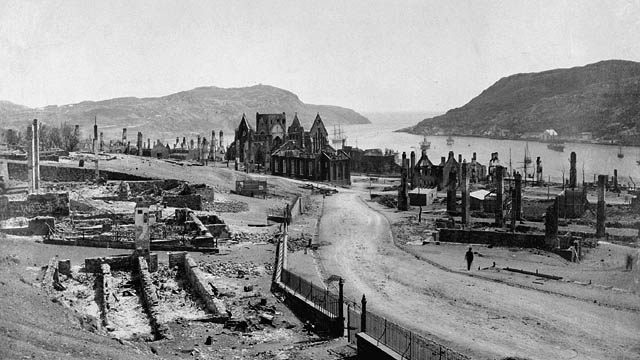
St. John's shortly after the Great Fire of 1892. The fire destroyed a significant portion of the city.

Guglielmo Marconi received the first transatlantic wireless signal in St. John's on 12 December 1901 from his wireless station in Poldhu, Cornwall. St. John's was the starting point for the first non-stop transatlantic aircraft flight, by Alcock and Brown in a modified Vickers Vimy IV bomber, in June 1919, departing from Lester's Field in St. John's and ending in a bog near Clifden, Connemara, Ireland. In July 2005, the flight was duplicated by American aviator and adventurer Steve Fossett in a replica Vickers Vimy aircraft, with St. John's International Airport substituting for Lester's Field (now an urban and residential part of the city).

During the Second World War, the harbour supported Royal Navy and Royal Canadian Navy ships that were engaged in anti-submarine warfare. It was the site of an American Army Air Force base, Fort Pepperrell, that was established as part of the "Lend-Lease" Destroyers for Bases Agreement between the United Kingdom and United States. The base included several US-manned coast defence guns, and a Canadian-manned battery of two Lend-Lease 10-inch (250 mm) M1888 guns was at Fort Cape Spear. The base was transferred to Canadian control in 1960 and is now known as CFS St. John's. The Knights of Columbus Hostel fire in December 1942 saw 99 military and civilian lives lost.

St. John's, and the province as a whole, was gravely affected in the 1990s by the collapse of the northern cod fishery, which had been the driving force of the provincial economy for hundreds of years. After a decade of high unemployment rates and depopulation, the city's proximity to the Hibernia, Terra Nova and White Rose oil fields led to an economic boom that spurred population growth and commercial development. As a result, the St. John's area now accounts for about half of the province's economic output.

As of 2012, St. John's contained 21 National Historic Sites of Canada.

==== Fires ====
St. John's was destroyed by major fires in 1816, 1817, 1819, 1846 and 1892, when each time a large part of the city was destroyed. The most famous was the Great Fire of 1892.

On 12 February 1816:

...about eight o'clock, a fire broke out in a house in a part of the town in St. John's in Newfoundland known by the name of the King's Beach, and speedily communicated to the houses adjoining, and burnt with so much fury, that one hundred and twenty houses, the homes of about a thousand men, women, and children, were consumed before the conflagration was stayed.

There were two citywide fires in 1817 "known jointly as 'The Great Fire of 1817'". Then in 1819 fire "destroyed 120 houses".

There was a further major fire in 1846, which started at the shop of a cabinetmaker named Hamlin, located on George Street off Queen Street, when a glue pot boiled over. The fire spread along Water and Duckworth Streets destroying all of the buildings in its path aided by the large quantities of seal oil that were stored in the merchants' premises. The fire was also aided by an attempt to blow up a house on Water Street which scattered burning embers across the city.

The final major conflagration of the nineteenth century began on the afternoon of 8 July 1892 atop Carter's Hill on Freshwater Road. Initially, the fire did not cause any widespread panic; however, a series of catastrophic coincidences caused the fire to spread and devour virtually all of the east end of the city, including much of its major commercial area, before being extinguished.

== Geography ==
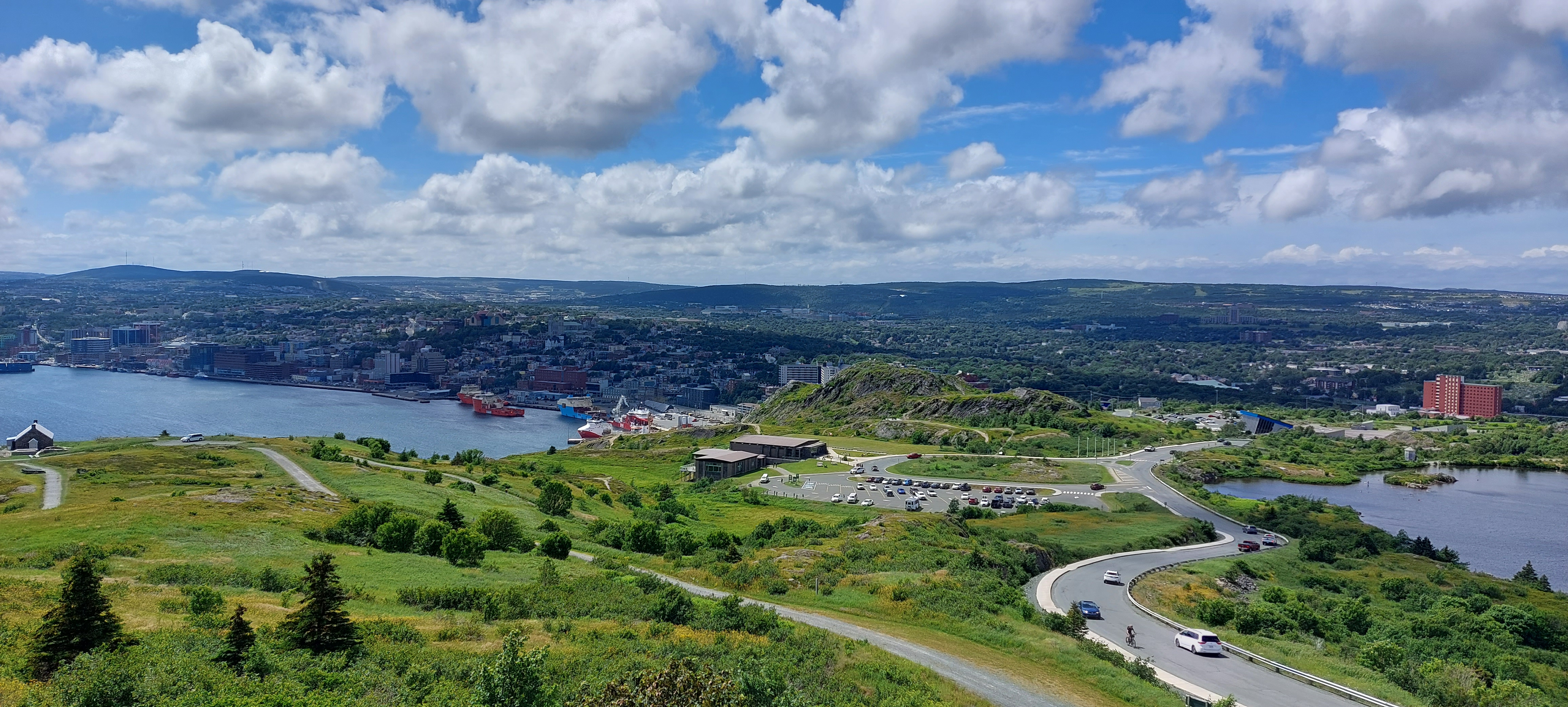
Lower slopes of Signal Hill National Historic Park, St. John's harbour and downtown

St. John's is along the coast of the Atlantic Ocean, on the northeast of the Avalon Peninsula in southeast Newfoundland. The city is North America's most easterly city, excluding Greenland. The city is the largest in the province and the second-largest in the Atlantic Provinces after Halifax, Nova Scotia. Its downtown area lies to the west and north of St. John's Harbour, and the rest of the city expands from the downtown to the north, south, east and west. The city covers a total of 446.04 square kilometres (172.22 sq mi) (larger than Montreal, Quebec), but the majority of its area remains covered by undeveloped woods.

Coniferous trees such as black spruce, white spruce, and balsam fir dominate the native vegetation. The largest deciduous tree is white birch; species of lesser stature include alder, cherry and mountain ash. Of introduced tree species, sycamore maple is most abundant and Norway maple is common. Blue spruce, common horsechestnut, European beech and littleleaf linden are among the other non-native species grown.

=== Climate ===
St. John's has a humid continental climate (Köppen Dfb) with smaller seasonal variation than normal for the latitude, which is due to Gulf Stream moderation.

Mean temperatures range from −4.7 °C (23.5 °F) in February to 16.5 °C (61.7 °F) in August, showing somewhat of a seasonal lag in the climate. The city is also one of the areas of the country most prone to tropical cyclone activity, as it is bordered by the Atlantic Ocean to the east, where tropical storms (and sometimes hurricanes) travel from the United States. With an annual average 1,538.9 millimetres (60.59 in) of precipitation, the city is one of the wettest in Canada outside of coastal British Columbia. This is partly due to its propensity for tropical storm activity as well as moist, Atlantic air frequently blowing ashore and creating precipitation.

Of major Canadian cities, St. John's is the foggiest (124 days) and windiest (24.3-kilometre-per-hour (15.1 mph) average speed). Precipitation is frequent and often heavy, falling year-round. On average, summer is the driest season, with only occasional thunderstorm activity. June is the driest month, averaging 88.2 mm (3.47 in) of precipitation. The wettest months are from October to January, with December the wettest single month, with 173.9 mm (6.85 in) of precipitation on average. This winter precipitation maximum is unusual for humid continental climates, which typically have a late spring or early summer precipitation maximum (for example, most of the Midwestern United States).

In winter, two or more types of precipitation (rain, freezing rain, sleet and snow) can fall from passage of a single storm. Snowfall is heavy, averaging approximately 242.8 centimetres (95.6 in) per winter season. However, winter storms can bring changing precipitation types. Heavy snow can turn into heavy rain, melting the snow cover, and possibly back to snow or ice (perhaps briefly) all in the same storm, resulting in little or no net snow accumulation. Snow cover in St. John's is variable, and especially early in the winter season, may be slow to develop, but can extend well into the spring months (March, April). The St. John's area is subject to freezing rain events (called "silver thaws"), the worst of which paralysed the city in April 1984 and April 2017.

On 17 January 2020, St. John's declared a state of emergency due to a snowstorm that brought an estimated 76 cm (30 in)—a one-day snowfall record for St. John's—and hurricane force winds up to 130 km/h (81 mph). The following day, the Canadian Army was called in to aid snow removal. The state of emergency ended eight days later.

The highest temperature ever recorded in St. John's was 33.9 °C (93.0 °F) on 14 August 1876. The coldest temperature ever recorded was −29.4 °C (−20.9 °F) on 16 February 1875.

Climate data for St. John's (St. John's International Airport) WMO ID: 71801; coordinates 47°37′20″N 52°44′34″W; elevation: 140.5 m (461 ft); 1991–2020 normals, extremes 1874–present (Note: Based on station coordinates provided by Environment and Climate Change Canada, climate data was collected in the area of downtown St. John's from 1874 to 1956, and at St. John's Airport from 1942 to the present day.)
Month	Jan	Feb	Mar	Apr	May	Jun	Jul	Aug	Sep	Oct	Nov	Dec	Year
Record high humidex	19.2	17.3	17.2	26.1	30.3	34.8	38.7	37.7	35.8	30.4	24.1	22.0	38.7
Record high °C (°F)	15.7 (60.3)	16.0 (60.8)	19.4 (66.9)	24.1 (75.4)	27.6 (81.7)	30.6 (87.1)	32.2 (90.0)	33.9 (93.0)	29.5 (85.1)	24.6 (76.3)	19.4 (66.9)	17.9 (64.2)	33.9 (93.0)
Mean maximum °C (°F)	9.2 (48.6)	8.1 (46.6)	10.0 (50.0)	15.1 (59.2)	21.1 (70.0)	24.7 (76.5)	27.5 (81.5)	27.3 (81.1)	24.6 (76.3)	20.1 (68.2)	16.2 (61.2)	12.2 (54.0)	28.3 (82.9)
Mean daily maximum °C (°F)	−0.7 (30.7)	−1.0 (30.2)	1.2 (34.2)	5.6 (42.1)	11.0 (51.8)	15.7 (60.3)	20.9 (69.6)	20.8 (69.4)	17.0 (62.6)	11.2 (52.2)	6.7 (44.1)	2.1 (35.8)	9.2 (48.6)
Daily mean °C (°F)	−4.2 (24.4)	−4.7 (23.5)	−2.2 (28.0)	1.8 (35.2)	6.3 (43.3)	10.8 (51.4)	16.0 (60.8)	16.5 (61.7)	12.8 (55.0)	7.8 (46.0)	3.4 (38.1)	−1.0 (30.2)	5.3 (41.5)
Mean daily minimum °C (°F)	−7.8 (18.0)	−8.4 (16.9)	−5.7 (21.7)	−1.9 (28.6)	1.6 (34.9)	5.9 (42.6)	11.2 (52.2)	12.1 (53.8)	8.5 (47.3)	4.3 (39.7)	0.0 (32.0)	−4.1 (24.6)	1.3 (34.4)
Mean minimum °C (°F)	−15.6 (3.9)	−16.0 (3.2)	−13.3 (8.1)	−7.4 (18.7)	−3.0 (26.6)	0.3 (32.5)	5.3 (41.5)	6.1 (43.0)	2.4 (36.3)	−1.4 (29.5)	−6.7 (19.9)	−11.8 (10.8)	−16.8 (1.8)
Record low °C (°F)	−28.3 (−18.9)	−29.4 (−20.9)	−25.6 (−14.1)	−18.3 (−0.9)	−6.7 (19.9)	−3.3 (26.1)	−1.1 (30.0)	0.5 (32.9)	−1.7 (28.9)	−5.6 (21.9)	−14.4 (6.1)	−20.0 (−4.0)	−29.4 (−20.9)
Record low wind chill	−35.7	−40.3	−40.3	−21.4	−14.2	−8.4	−3.4	0.0	−4.4	−11.8	−24.6	−34.3	−40.3
Average precipitation mm (inches)	153.0 (6.02)	122.8 (4.83)	140.1 (5.52)	121.6 (4.79)	98.1 (3.86)	88.2 (3.47)	100.1 (3.94)	99.8 (3.93)	125.8 (4.95)	158.1 (6.22)	157.4 (6.20)	173.9 (6.85)	1,538.9 (60.58)
Average rainfall mm (inches)	67.7 (2.67)	55.3 (2.18)	78.9 (3.11)	91.9 (3.62)	93.6 (3.69)	88.1 (3.47)	100.1 (3.94)	99.8 (3.93)	125.8 (4.95)	155.7 (6.13)	132.4 (5.21)	107.7 (4.24)	1,197 (47.13)
Average snowfall cm (inches)	95.4 (37.6)	77.1 (30.4)	62.0 (24.4)	29.5 (11.6)	4.5 (1.8)	0.0 (0.0)	0.0 (0.0)	0.0 (0.0)	0.0 (0.0)	2.3 (0.9)	22.3 (8.8)	70.3 (27.7)	363.4 (143.1)
Average precipitation days (≥ 0.2 mm)	21.7	18.8	19.0	17.2	16.9	14.6	13.5	14.1	15.3	18.1	19.0	21.5	209.6
Average rainy days (≥ 0.2 mm)	9.7	8.4	10.9	13.6	16.3	14.6	13.5	14.1	15.3	17.8	15.6	12.7	162.3
Average snowy days (≥ 0.2 cm)	18.4	15.2	13.3	7.5	2.0	0.04	0.0	0.0	0.04	0.96	6.6	14.0	78.1
Average relative humidity (%) (at 1500 LST)	80.8	77.4	76.2	74.5	71.1	71.3	70.4	71.6	73.0	77.0	79.6	82.6	75.4
Average dew point °C (°F)	−6.5 (20.3)	−7.1 (19.2)	−5.1 (22.8)	−1.5 (29.3)	2.4 (36.3)	7.1 (44.8)	12.2 (54.0)	12.9 (55.2)	9.8 (49.6)	5.1 (41.2)	0.8 (33.4)	−3.4 (25.9)	2.3 (36.1)
Mean monthly sunshine hours	65.5	90.2	107.4	140.4	176.3	198.9	216.7	206.6	170.5	122.1	76.3	62.4	1,633.2
Mean daily sunshine hours	8.7	10.2	11.2	13.6	15.0	15.5	14.9	14.2	12.9	10.3	10.1	8.5	15.5
Percentage possible sunshine	23.7	31.1	29.2	34.3	37.6	41.7	44.9	46.7	45.1	36.2	27.2	23.7	35.1
Average ultraviolet index	1	2	3	5	6	7	7	7	5	3	1	1	4
Source 1: Environment and Climate Change Canada (February minimum) (August maximum) (December maximum) (sunshine)
Source 2: Weather Atlas (dew point, mean maximum, and mean minimum)

== Downtown architecture ==
Downtown St. John's architecture has a distinct style. Starting originally as a fishing outpost for European fishermen, St. John's consisted mostly of the homes of fishermen, sheds, storage shacks, and wharves constructed out of wood. As the Industrial Revolution developed and new methods and materials for construction were introduced, and the cityscape changed as the city grew. The Great Fire of 1892 destroyed most of the downtown core, and most residential and other wood-frame buildings date from this period. The City's earliest suburbs in the area now known as Georgestown were not touched by the fire.

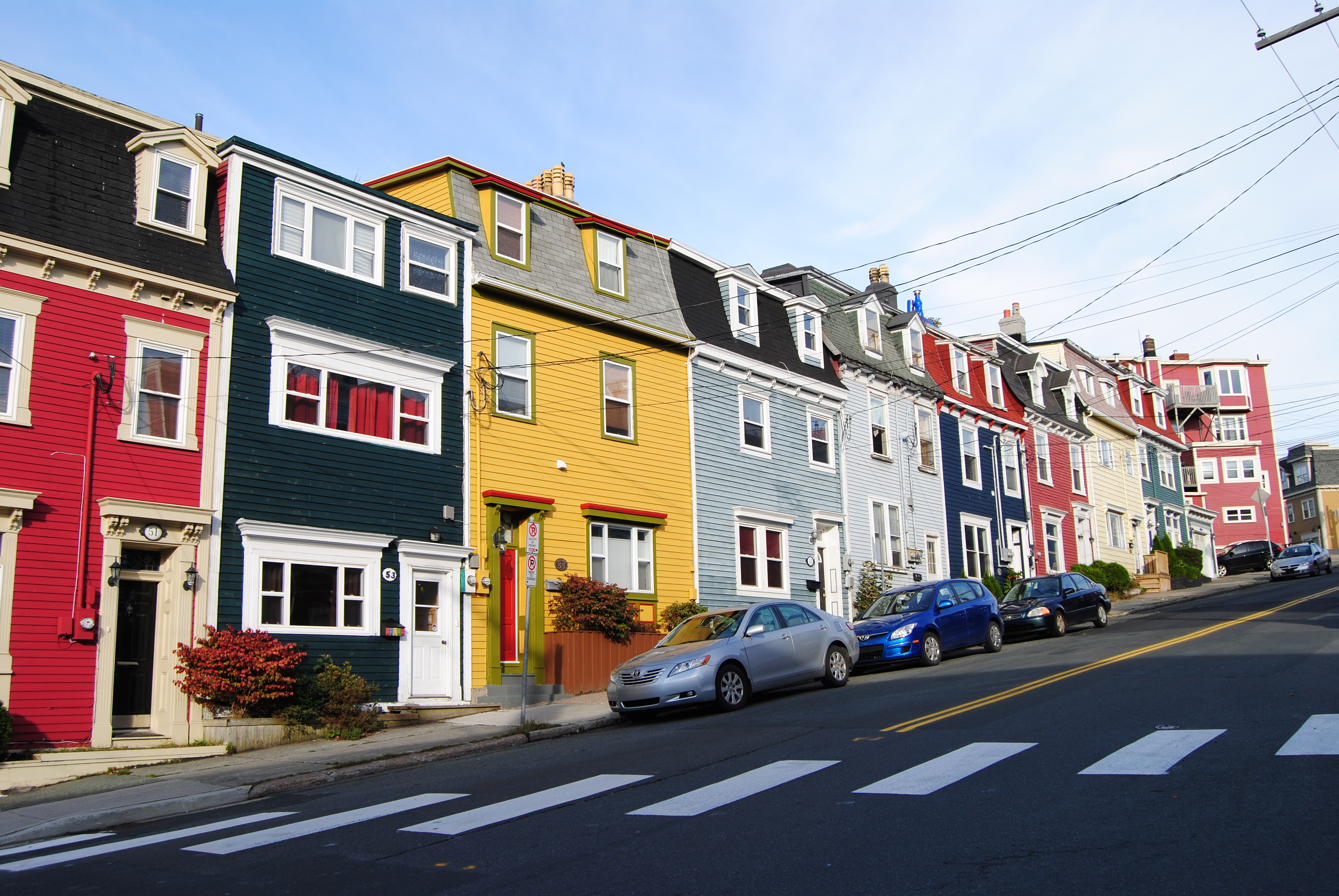
Some houses in St. John's are painted in bright colours

Built on hilly terrain and steep maze of residential streets, in St. John's is typically painted in bright colours, hence the nickname Jelly Bean Row for downtown row housing. However, downtown St. John's wasn't always as bright and colourful as it is today. The coal soot that blanketed St. John's in much of the 19th and 20th centuries made light exterior paint colours impractical. Houses along downtown streets and lanes were mostly dark shades of green, red, brown, and grey. Bright colours were introduced in the 1970s when coal was no longer used.

The city council implemented strict heritage regulations in the downtown area, including restrictions on the height of buildings. These regulations have caused much controversy over the years. With the city experiencing an economic boom a lack of hotel rooms and office space has seen proposals put forward that do not meet the current height regulations. Heritage advocates argue the current regulations should be enforced while others believe the regulations should be relaxed to encourage economic development.

To meet the need for more office space downtown, the city council amended heritage regulations, which originally restricted height to 15 metres (49 ft) in the area of land on Water Street between Bishop's Cove and Steer's Cove, to create the "Commercial Central Retail – West Zone". The new zone allows for higher buildings. A 47-metre (154-foot), 12-storey office building, which includes retail space and a parking garage, was the first building to be approved in this area.

== Neighbourhoods ==
The city of St. John's is made up of many neighbourhoods. Georgestown was the first suburb. The Goulds and Kilbride are former communities that have been amalgamated with St. John's. The Battery is an outport within the city of St. John's. Quidi Vidi is a similar, former fishing village on the outskirts of St John's.

== Demographics ==
Historical populations
Year	Pop.	±%
1951	52,873	—
1956	57,078	+8.0%
1961	63,633	+11.5%
1966	79,884	+25.5%
1971	88,102	+10.3%
1976	86,576	−1.7%
1981	83,770	−3.2%
1986	96,216	+14.9%
1991	95,770	−0.5%
1996	101,936	+6.4%
2001	99,182	−2.7%
2006	100,646	+1.5%
2011	106,172	+5.5%
2016	108,860	+2.5%
2021	110,525	+1.5%
Source: Statistics Canada

Ethnic origin, percentage
Ethnic origin	2016	2021
Canadian	42.3	18.5
English	40.4	36.6
Irish	32.7	34.0
Scottish	9.3	8.5
French	5.4	4.9
Aboriginal	4.9	1.3
German	2.9	2.0
Newfoundlander	1.3	5.7

In the 2021 Canadian census conducted by Statistics Canada, St. John's had a population of 110,525 living in 49,298 of its 54,067 total private dwellings, a change of 1.5% from its 2016 population of 108,860. With a land area of 446.02 km^{2} (172.21 sq mi), it had a population density of 247.8/km^{2} (641.8/sq mi) in 2021.

At the census metropolitan area (CMA) level in the 2021 census, the St. John's CMA had a population of 212,579 living in 89,999 of its 97,429 total private dwellings, a change of 2% from its 2016 population of 208,418. With a land area of 931.56 km^{2} (359.68 sq mi), it had a population density of 228.2/km^{2} (591.0/sq mi) in 2021.

Apart from St. John's, the CMA includes 12 other communities: the city of Mount Pearl and the towns of Conception Bay South, Paradise, Portugal Cove-St. Philip's, Torbay, Logy Bay-Middle Cove-Outer Cove, Pouch Cove, Flatrock, Bay Bulls, Witless Bay, Petty Harbour-Maddox Cove and Bauline.

Also as of the 2021 census, there are 178,427 people in the St. John's population centre. There are 52,410 total private dwellings in St. John's with an occupancy rate of 90.9%. The median value of a private dwelling in St. John's is $309,631, lower than the national median value of $341,556 but higher than the provincial median value of $219,228.

St. John's has a median age of 40.5 compared to 41.2 nationally and 46.0 in Newfoundland and Labrador. Children under 15 make up 13.9% of the population while people 65 and over make up 16.5%. 70.6% of residents aged 25 to 65 have a post secondary certificate, diploma or degree, while 20.6% have a secondary school diploma or equivalent, 7.4% have an apprenticeship or trades certificate, and 8.8% hold no certificates, diplomas or degrees. The city has an unemployment rate of 8.9%, much lower than the provincial rate of 15.6% but somewhat higher than the national rate of 7.7%.

The 2021 census reported that immigrants (individuals born outside Canada) comprise 7,515 persons or 7.0% of the total population of St. John's. Of the total immigrant population, the top countries of origin were United Kingdom (805 persons or 10.7%), Philippines (625 persons or 8.3%), United States of America (510 persons or 6.8%), India (485 persons or 6.5%), Syria (455 persons or 6.1%), China (420 persons or 5.6%), Nigeria (310 persons or 4.1%), Bangladesh (195 persons or 2.6%), Pakistan (155 persons or 2.1%), and Eritrea (150 persons or 2.0%).

=== Ethnicity ===
As of 2021, approximately 86.5% of the city was white, 10.1% were visible minorities and 3.3% were Indigenous. The largest visible minority groups were South Asian Canadian (2.8%), followed by Black Canadians (2.3%), Chinese Canadians and Arab Canadians (1.3% each).

Panethnic groups in the City of St. John's (2001−2021)
Panethnic group	2021		2016		2011		2006		2001	
Panethnic group	Pop.	%	Pop.	%	Pop.	%	Pop.	%	Pop.	%
European (Note: Statistic includes all persons that did not make up part of a visible minority or an indigenous identity.)	93,160	86.53%	96,310	89.93%	96,995	93.35%	95,365	95.92%	95,235	97.29%
Indigenous	3,585	3.33%	3,250	3.03%	2,705	2.6%	1,110	1.12%	685	0.7%
South Asian	2,985	2.77%	1,640	1.53%	1,195	1.15%	875	0.88%	700	0.72%
African	2,510	2.33%	1,495	1.4%	930	0.9%	520	0.52%	240	0.25%
Middle Eastern (Note: Statistic includes total responses of "West Asian" and "Arab" under visible minority section on census.)	1,895	1.76%	1,270	1.19%	335	0.32%	245	0.25%	230	0.23%
East Asian (Note: Statistic includes total responses of "Chinese", "Korean", and "Japanese" under visible minority section on census.)	1,550	1.44%	1,750	1.63%	1,100	1.06%	870	0.88%	535	0.55%
Southeast Asian (Note: Statistic includes total responses of "Filipino" and "Southeast Asian" under visible minority section on census.)	1,140	1.06%	710	0.66%	310	0.3%	105	0.11%	165	0.17%
Latin American	515	0.48%	485	0.45%	130	0.13%	285	0.29%	45	0.05%
Other (Note: Statistic includes total responses of "Visible minority, n.i.e." and "Multiple visible minorities" under visible minority section on census.)	325	0.3%	185	0.17%	205	0.2%	55	0.06%	40	0.04%
Total responses	107,660	97.41%	107,095	98.38%	103,905	97.86%	99,425	98.79%	97,885	98.69%
Total population	110,525	100%	108,860	100%	106,172	100%	100,646	100%	99,182	100%

- Note: Totals greater than 100% due to multiple origin responses.

=== Language ===
English is the mother tongue spoken by the majority of residents of St. John's (92.9%).

Canada Census Mother Tongue - St. John's, Newfoundland and Labrador
Census	Total	English			French			English & French			Other		
Year	Responses	Count	Trend	Pop %	Count	Trend	Pop %	Count	Trend	Pop %	Count	Trend	Pop %
2021	108,065	98,560	▼1.4%	91.2%	645	▼0.8%	0.6%	360	▲100.0%	0.3%	7,195	▲16.4%	6.7%
2016	107,645	100,010	▲0.3%	92.9%	650	▲30.0%	0.6%	180	▲16.1%	0.2%	6,180	▲56.1%	5.7%
2011	104,715	99,745	▲4.4%	95.3%	500	▲0.1%	0.5%	155	▲63.2%	0.1%	3,960	▲15.8%	3.8%
2006	99,425	95,555	▲0.1%	96.1%	355	▼2.7%	0.4%	95	▲111.1%	0.1%	3,420	▲72.7%	3.4%
2001	97,885	95,495	▼2.3%	97.6%	365	▼16.1%	0.4%	45	▼57.1%	0.0%	1,980	▼6.6%	2.0%
1996	100,525	97,735	n/a	97.2%	435	n/a	0.4%	105	n/a	0.1%	2,120	n/a	2.1%

=== Religion ===
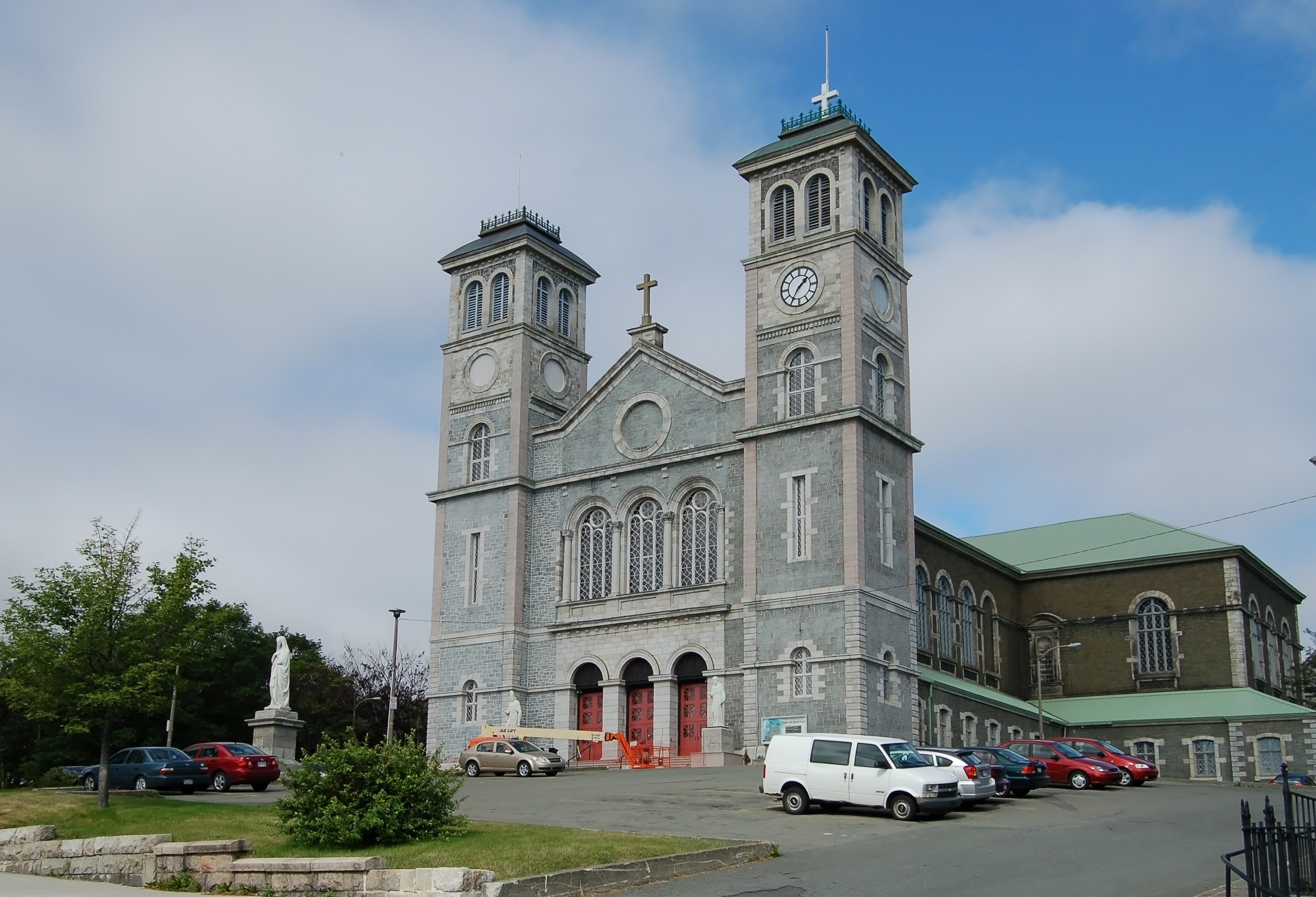
The Basilica of St. John the Baptist is the seat of the Roman Catholic Archdiocese of St. John's. The Catholic church is the largest religious institution in the city.

According to the 2021 census, religious groups in St. John's included:

- Christianity (75,965 persons or 70.6%)
- No religion (26,170 persons or 24.3%)
- Islam (3,215 persons or 3.0%)
- Hinduism (890 persons or 0.8%)
- Sikhism (475 persons or 0.4%)
- Buddhism (285 persons or 0.3%)
- Judaism (175 persons or 0.2%)
- Indigenous Spirituality (25 persons or 0.1%)
- Other (470 persons or 0.4%)

The information below is from the 2001 Canadian Census and the National Household Survey 2011.

The population of St. John's was once divided along sectarian (Catholic/Protestant) lines, but in recent years this sectarianism has declined significantly. The city is the seat of the Roman Catholic Archbishop of St. John's, and the Anglican Bishop of Eastern Newfoundland and Labrador. All major Christian sects showed a decline from 2001 to 2011 with an increase in those with no religion from 3.9% to 11.1%.

Religion	2001 %	2011 %	2011 Total	2021 %	2021 Total
Roman Catholic	48.9%	48.4%	50,370	38.5%	41,450
Anglican	22.8%	16.1%	16,745	12.6%	13,515
United Church	15.0%	12.8%	13,345	8.9%	9,635
Pentecostal	2.3%	2.3%	2,390	2.0%	2,180
No religion	3.9%	11.1%	11,505	24.3%	26,170

== Economy ==
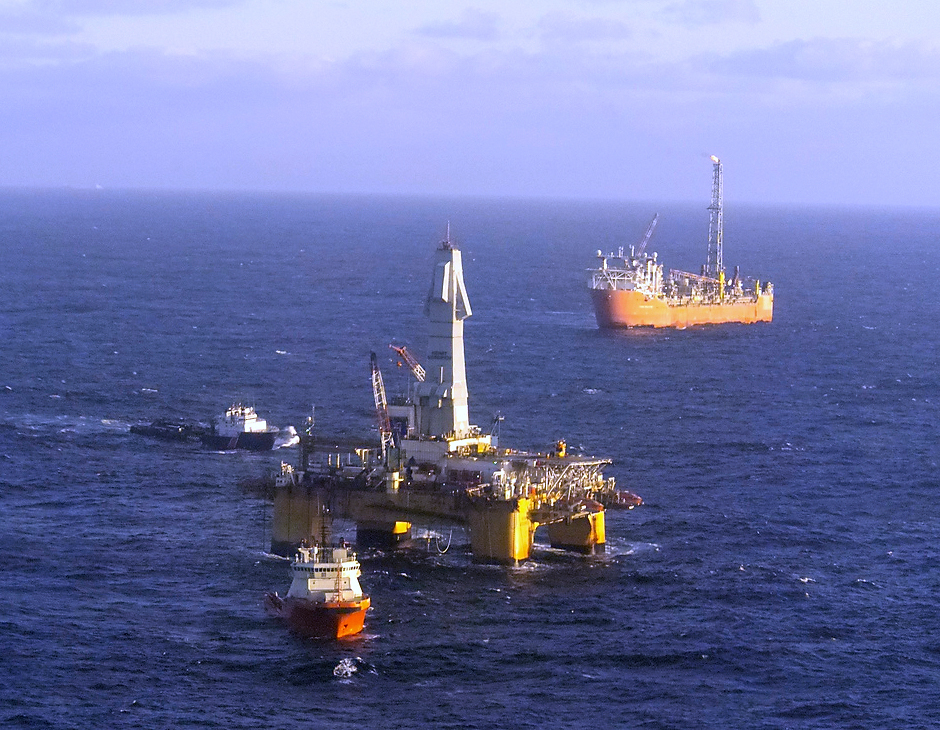
An oil platform in the Terra Nova oil field. A number of offshore oil developments lie off the coast of St. John's.

St. John's economy is connected both to its role as the provincial capital of Newfoundland and Labrador and to the ocean. The civil service which is supported by the federal, provincial and municipal governments has been the key to the expansion of the city's labour force and to the stability of its economy, which supports a sizeable retail, service and business sector. With the collapse of the cod fishing industry in Newfoundland and Labrador in the 1990s, the role of the ocean is now tied to what lies beneath it – oil and gas – as opposed to what swims in or travels across it. The city is the centre of the oil and gas industry in Eastern Canada and is one of 19 World Energy Cities. ExxonMobil Canada is headquartered in St. John's and companies such as Chevron, Husky Energy, Suncor Energy and Statoil have major regional operations in the city. Three major offshore oil developments, Hibernia, Terra Nova and White Rose, are in production off the coast of the city and a fourth development, Hebron, discovered in 1981 and put online in 2017, is estimated to contain over 700 million barrels of producible hydrocarbons.

The economy has grown quickly. In 2010 and 2011, the metro area's gross domestic product (GDP) led 27 other metropolitan areas in the country, according to the Conference Board of Canada, recording growth of 6.6% and 5.8% respectively. As of 2010 the city's per capita GDP of $52,000 was the second highest out of all major Canadian cities. Economic forecasts suggested the city would continue its strong economic growth in the near future not only in the "oceanic" industries mentioned above, but also in tourism and new home construction as the population continues to grow. In May 2011, the city's unemployment rate fell to 5.6%, the second lowest unemployment rate for a major city in Canada at the time.

St. John's is also becoming known as an entrepreneurial city. In a 2009 report by the Canadian Federation of Independent Business, Communities in Boom: Canada's Top Entrepreneurial Cities, St. John's was ranked the best major city in Atlantic Canada and 19th overall in Canada for providing a good environment for small business development.

=== Tourism ===
Tourism is also a significant contributor to the province's economy. An important aspect of this are cruise ships that "include the Port of St. John's on their … itineraries as both a home port and in-transit port of call".

== Culture ==
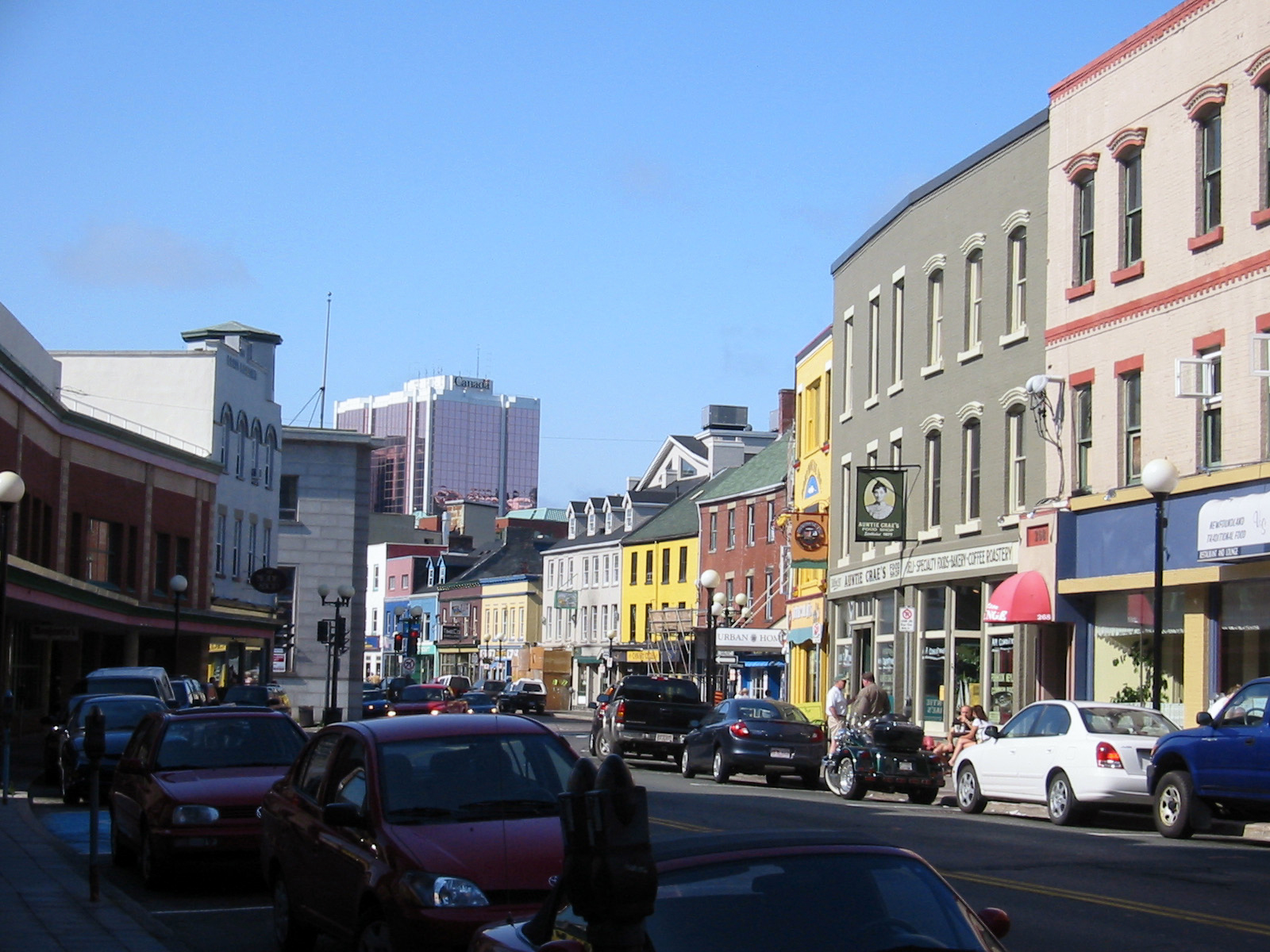
Water Street is notable for its boutiques and restaurants

The downtown area is the cultural hub of St. John's and is a major tourist destination in Newfoundland and Labrador and Atlantic Canada. Water Street and Duckworth Street are known for their brightly coloured low-rise heritage buildings, housing numerous tourist shops, clothing boutiques, and restaurants.

George Street, a downtown side street above the western end of Water Street, is the predominant home of the city's nightlife. It holds numerous annual festivals including the George Street Festival in August and the Mardi Gras Festival in October. The street can be credited with kick-starting the careers of many musical acts and is busy nearly every night of the week.

The LSPU Hall is home to the Resource Centre for the Arts. The "Hall" hosts a large arts community and is regarded as the backbone of artistic infrastructure and development in the downtown. The careers of many well-known Newfoundland artists were launched there including Rick Mercer, Mark Critch, Mary Walsh, Cathy Jones, Andy Jones and Greg Thomey. The St. John's Arts and Culture Centre houses an art gallery, libraries and a 1,000-seat theatre, which is the city's major venue for entertainment productions.

=== Theatre ===
In 1967, the St. John's Arts and Culture Centre was opened along with the first all-Canadian Dominion Drama Festival. Other theatrical venues include the LSPU Hall and the Holy Heart School's theatre.

=== Literature ===
The City has an annual poet laureate to "acknowledging and celebrating poets, literary arts, and their value and contribution to civic life".

=== Film ===
The Nickel Film Festival and the St. John's International Women's Film Festival are two independent film festivals held annually in St. John's. Republic of Doyle is a Canadian comedy-drama television series set in St. John's, which aired on CBC Television (2010–2014). Another TV crime series, Hudson & Rex was filmed in the city.

=== Music ===
The city has a symphony orchestra, a string quartet, and several choirs. In addition the School of Music of Memorial University of Newfoundland has several ensembles, including a chamber orchestra. St. Johns also plays host to the Tuckamore Festival of chamber music, which has been held every August since 2001. Opera on the Avalon puts on performances of opera, over several days, in the summer. Established in 1987, the Kittiwake Dance Theatre is one of the province's leading dance companies. Kilautiup Songuninga, formed in 2006, was the first Inuit drum dancing and throat singing group to be based in St. John's.

Lawnya Vawnya is an annual music festival.

Another festival is The Sound Symposium, which "has been running bi-annually since conception in 1983" that "brings together musicians, actors, dancers, visual and environmental artists, and creators of all stripes – both local and international, ‘new age’ and traditional, in celebration of the beauty of sound". A major aspect of The Sound Symposium is the Harbour Symphony a compositions played daily at noon by the horns of the ships in the harbour.

=== Museums ===
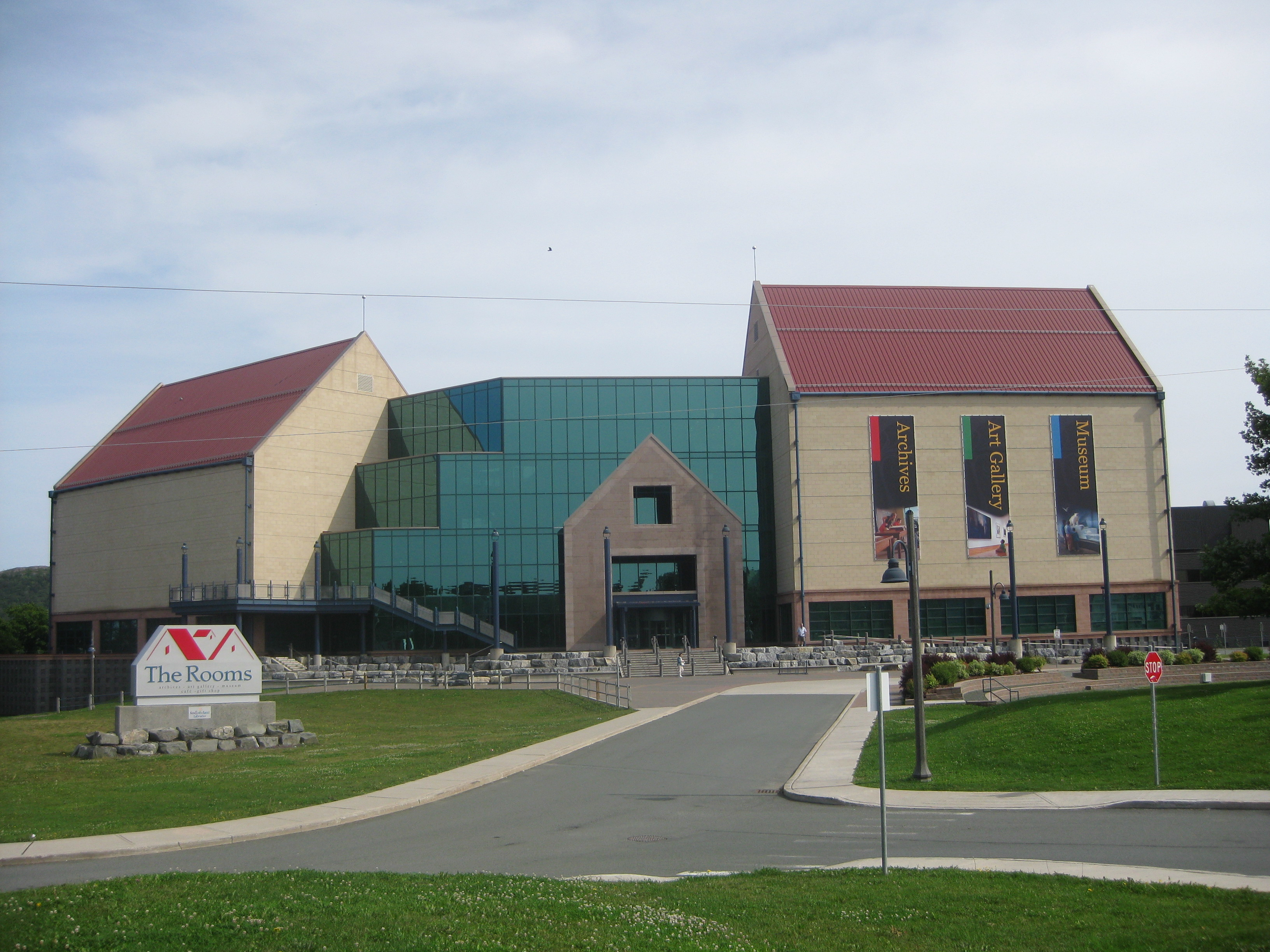
Located in downtown St. John's, The Rooms houses the provincial art gallery and museum

The Provincial Museum of Newfoundland and Labrador (c. 1892–1893) was on Duckworth Street in a building designated as a heritage site by the City of St. John's. In 2005, the museum, along with the Art Gallery of Newfoundland and Labrador and the Provincial Archives of Newfoundland and Labrador, moved into The Rooms. The Rooms is Newfoundland and Labrador's cultural facility, and is in the downtown area.

Other museums include the Railway Coastal Museum, a transportation museum in the 104-year-old Newfoundland and Labrador train station building on Water Street. The Johnson Geo Centre is a geological interpretation centre on Signal Hill.

=== National Historic Sites ===
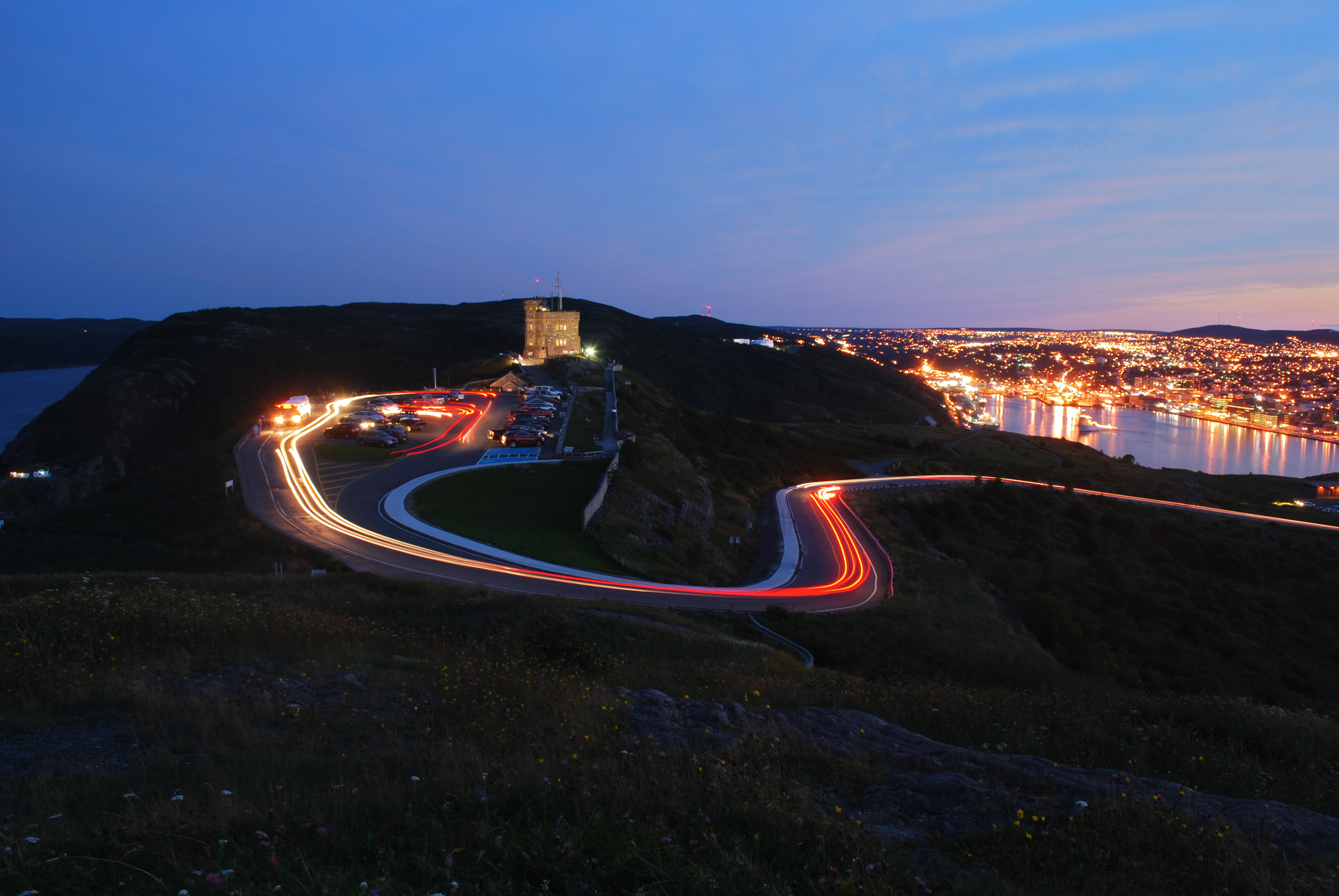
Cabot Tower overlooks the city from Signal Hill. The hill was named a National Historic Site due to its association with Canada's defence and communication history.

The Murray Premises is a National Historic Site in downtown St. John's. The buildings once served as a fishery premises, with facilities for drying and packaging fish and warehouses for fish, barrels and other items. The oldest of the buildings is the one facing on Beck's Cove. It was built after the 1846 fire and for a time served as both shop and house. The Murray Premises was renovated in 1979 and now contains office suites, restaurants, retail stores and a boutique hotel.

Another National Historic Site is Signal Hill, a hill which overlooks the city of St. John's. It is the location of Cabot Tower which was built in 1897 to commemorate the 400th anniversary of John Cabot's arrival in Newfoundland, and Queen Victoria's Diamond Jubilee. The first transatlantic Wireless transmission was received here by Guglielmo Marconi on 12 December 1901. Today, Signal Hill is a National Historic Site of Canada, popular among tourists and locals; 97% of all tourists to St. John's visit Signal Hill. Amongst its popular attractions are the Signal Hill Tattoo, showcasing the Royal Newfoundland Regiment of Foot, c. 1795, and the North Head Trail which offers an impressive view of the Atlantic Ocean and the surrounding coast.

== Parks ==
Pippy Park is an urban park in the east end of the city; with over 1,400 hectares (5.4 sq mi; 3,500 acres) of land, it is one of Canada's largest urban parks. The park contains a range of recreational facilities including two golf courses, Newfoundland and Labrador's largest serviced campground, walking and skiing trails as well as protected habitat for many plants and animals. Pippy Park is also home to the Fluvarium, an environmental education centre which offers a cross section view of Nagle's Hill Brook.

Bowring Park, in the Waterford Valley, is one of the most scenic parks in St. John's. Entrance to the park is via Waterford Bridge Road, passing a sculptured duck pond and a statue of Peter Pan. The parkland was donated to the city in 1911 by Sir Edgar Rennie Bowring on behalf of Bowring Brothers Ltd. on their 100th anniversary of commerce in Newfoundland. The park was officially opened by His Royal Highness, the Duke of Connaught on 15 July 1914.

Bannerman Park is a Victorian-style park near the downtown. The park was officially opened in 1891 by Sir Alexander Bannerman, Governor of the Colony of Newfoundland who donated the land to create the park. Today the park contains a public swimming pool, playground, a baseball diamond and many large open grassy areas. Bannerman Park hosts many festivals and sporting events, most notably the Newfoundland and Labrador Folk Festival and St. John's Peace-a-chord. The park is also the finishing location for the annual Tely 10 Mile Road Race.

Closeby, the Lieutenant-Governor's residence sits in a park-like setting which is open to the public.

=== Botanical Garden ===
Memorial University of Newfoundland operates a 45 ha (110-acre) Botanical Garden.

=== Johnson Geo-Vista Park ===
Associated with the Johnson Geo Centre there, is on the lower slopes of Signal Hill, a small park that contains a fen, the small lake, Deadman's Pond, as well as a network of walking trails.

== Sport ==
=== Hockey ===
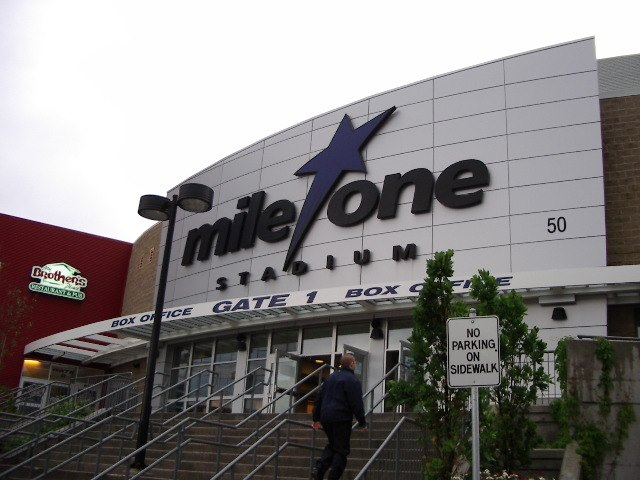
Mary Brown's Centre is a multi-purpose indoor arena. It is used as the home arena for the TBL'sNewfoundland Rogues and the QMJHL's Newfoundland Regiment.

St. John's has been home to several professional hockey franchises. The St. John's Maple Leafs were an American Hockey League (AHL) team from 1991 to 2005. The team left after the 2004–05 season to Toronto due to the desire of its parent team, the Toronto Maple Leafs, to reduce travel costs and to have a tenant for its Ricoh Coliseum.

Shortly after, the Maple Leafs were replaced by the St. John's Fog Devils of the Quebec Major Junior Hockey League (QMJHL). The team left St. John's in 2008 after just three seasons due to a poor lease arrangement with the city over the use of Mary Brown's Centre (formerly Mile One Centre) and poor attendance.

From 2011 until 2017, it was home to the St. John's IceCaps in the AHL. The IceCaps operated under two separate franchises and affiliations during its time in St. John's; the first owned by the Winnipeg Jets' True North Sports & Entertainment and the second by the Montreal Canadiens' Molson family. Both franchises were relocated to be closer to their parent team.

In 2018, the ECHL approved an expansion team for St. John's with the Newfoundland Growlers. The team became the ECHL affiliate of the Toronto Maple Leafs bringing the Leafs back to St. John's for the first time since 2005. In their first season, they won the Kelly Cup as champions of the league. In April 2024, the Growlers ceased operations before the 2023–24 ECHL season concluded.

In December 2024, the new ownership group of the Acadie-Bathurst Titan of the Quebec Maritimes Junior Hockey League (QMJHL) relocated the franchise to St. John's. The franchise was renamed the Newfoundland Regiment in January 2025 in honour to the military history of the province and began operation in the following 2025–26 QMJHL season.

=== Other sports ===
The St. John's Edge was a Canadian professional basketball team based in National Basketball League of Canada that launched as an expansion team for the 2017–18 season at the Mile One Centre. The team was owned by Atlantic Sport Enterprises Ltd. headed by John Graham with Irwin Simon and Robert Sabbagh. The team replaced the IceCaps as the primary tenant at the Mile One Centre after their departure. In 2021, the Edge did not obtain a lease extension at the Mile One Centre.

In September 2021, the City of St. John's signed a five-year lease agreement with the American Basketball Association, to bring the expansion Newfoundland Rogues to Mile One Centre. Several weeks after the announcement of a new basketball team, Mary Browns, a fast food chain that originated in Newfoundland, purchased the naming rights to Mile One Centre, renaming it Mary Brown's Centre. The Newfoundland Rogues have since changed leagues, and currently play in the Basketball Super League at Mary Brown's Centre.

The Atlantic Rock are a senior men's rugby union team who compete in the Canadian Rugby Championship. The Rock play their home games at Swilers Rugby Park, as did the Rugby Canada Super League champions for 2005 and 2006, the Newfoundland Rock. The city hosted a Rugby World Cup qualifying match between Canada and the United States on 12 August 2006, where the Canadians heavily defeated the United States 56–7 to qualify for the 2007 Rugby World Cup finals in France. The 2007 age-grade Rugby Canada National Championship Festival was held in the city.

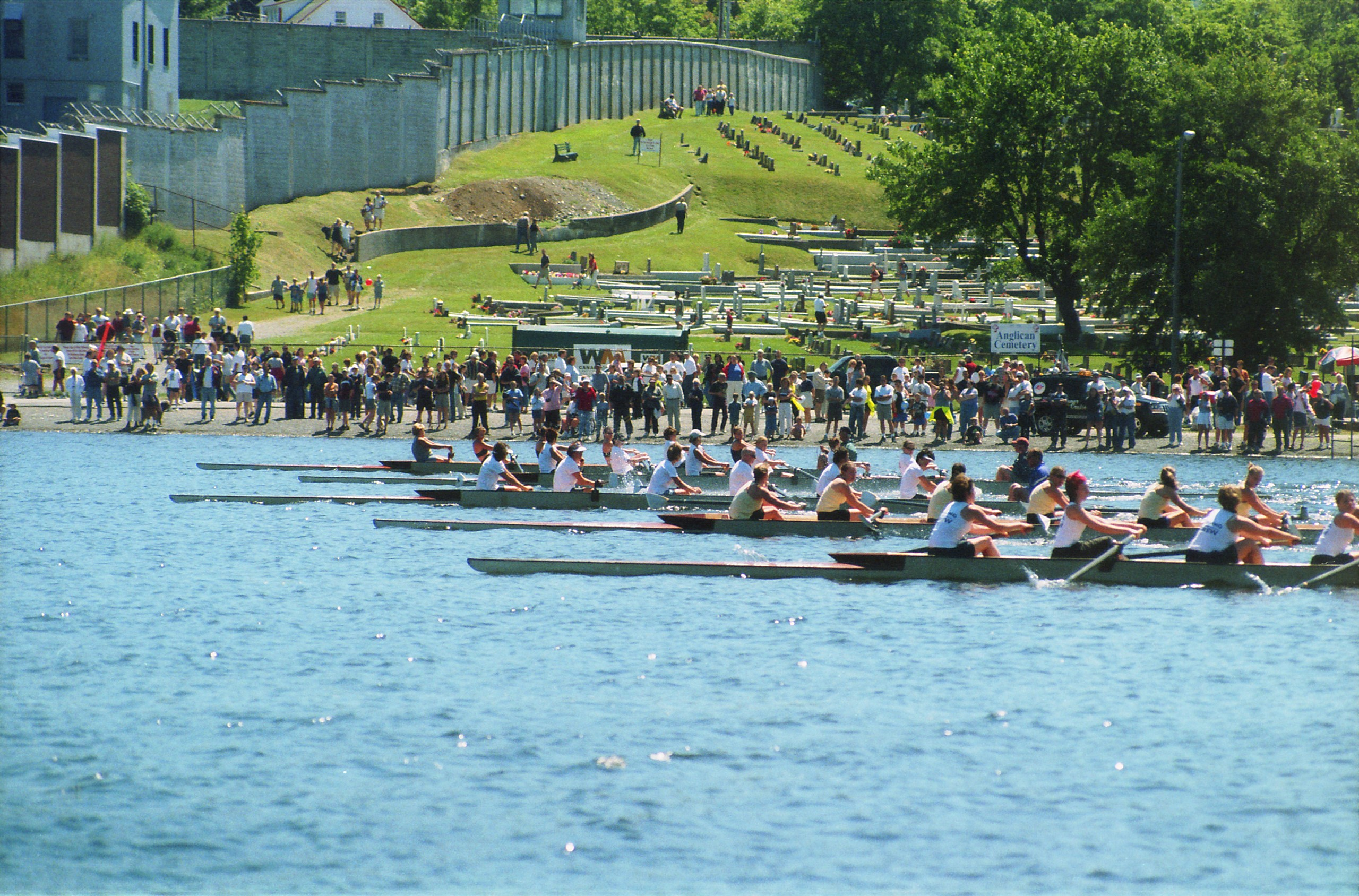
St. John's hosts North America's oldest annual sporting event, the Royal St. John's Regatta

St. John's is home to North America's oldest annual sporting event, the Royal St. John's Regatta, which dates back to at least 1816. The event is important enough in the life of the city that the day of the Regatta (the first Wednesday in August, weather permitting) is a civic holiday – one of the few weather-dependent holidays in the world.

The Tely 10 Mile Road Race is an annual 10 miles (16 km) road race that starts in Paradise and finishes at Bannerman Park. The race draws in excess of 2,500 runners. It began in 1922, which makes it one of the oldest road races in Canada.

St. John's was where the Canada men's national soccer team qualified for their first FIFA World Cup on 14 September 1985, when they defeated Honduras 2–1, at King George V Park.

Curling has gained prominence in St. John's over the years. The 2005 Scott Tournament of Hearts, the Canadian women's curling championship, was held at Mile One Centre from 19 to 27 February 2005. The 2006 Olympic gold medalist men's curling team, skipped by Brad Gushue, is based in St. John's at the Bally Haly Golf & Curling Club. Gushue and his team launched a campaign to return the Brier to the province for 2017, a successful bid. They went on to win the Brier as well as representing Canada at the World Championships three weeks later going undefeated and winning the gold medal. The Brier win was the second for the province (1976) and the second time as event host (1972). The city has two curling clubs, the St. John's Curling Club and the Bally Haly.

The St. John's Avalon Harps are the local hurling and Gaelic football team, that compete in Canadian Gaelic Athletic Association events.

Other notable sporting events held by Summerside include:

- 1977 Canada Games
- 1994 Women's Softball World Championship
- 1997 Jr. Men's Softball World Championship

== Law and government ==
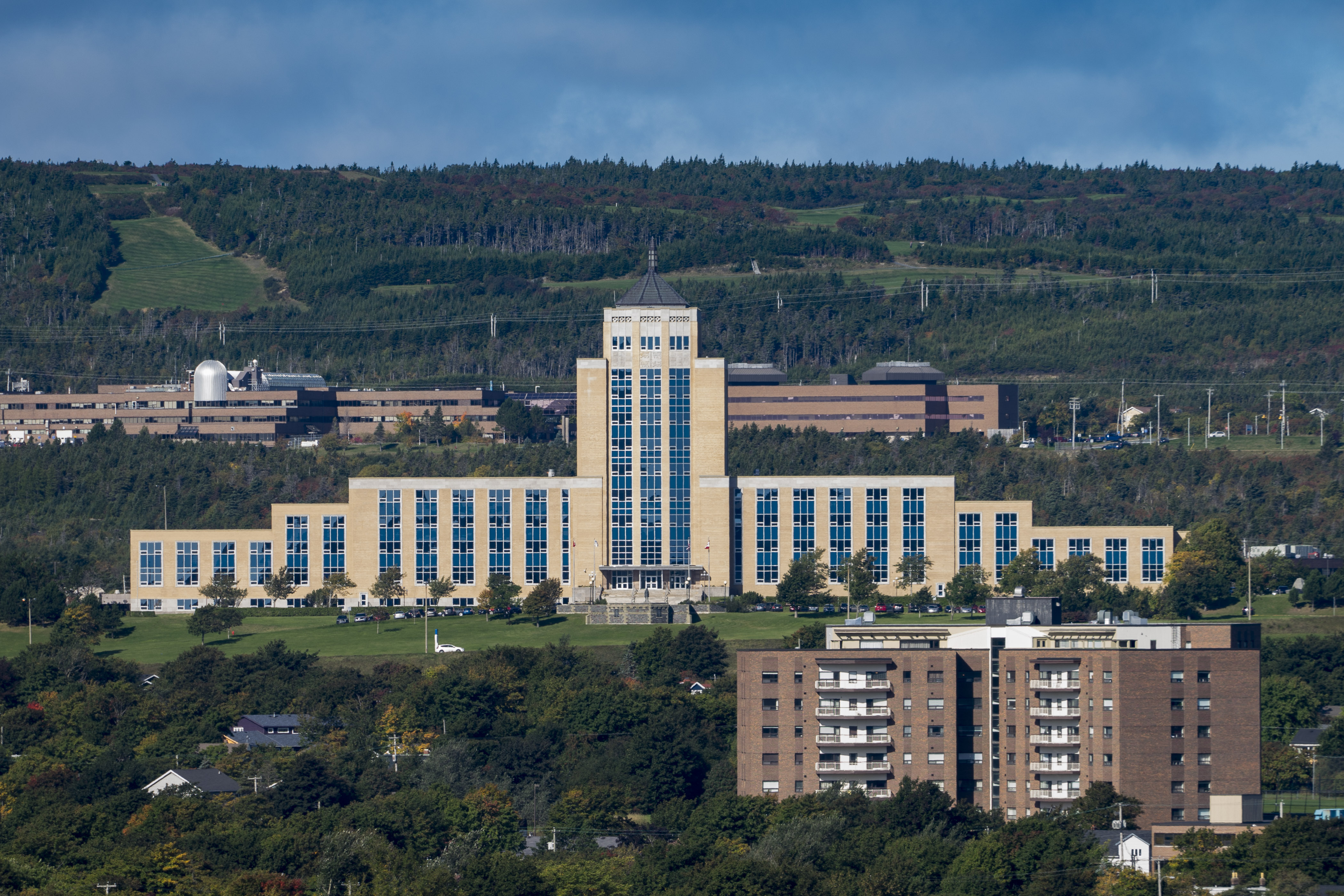
The province's House of Assembly meets in St. John's, at Confederation Building

St. John's is governed by a mayor-council system, and the structure of the municipal government is stipulated by the City of St. John's Act. St. John's City Council is a unicameral legislative body composed of a mayor, deputy mayor and nine councillors. The mayor, deputy mayor and four of the councillors are elected at large while the five other councillors represent geographical wards throughout the city. The mayor and members of the city council serve four-year terms without term limits.

Elections in St. John's are held every four years on the last Tuesday in September. The current city council was elected in the municipal election held in 2025. The Mayor of St. John's is Danny Breen. The St. John's City Hall, on New Gower Street, has housed municipal offices and Council Chambers since being officially opened in 1970.

St. John's served as the capital city of the Colony of Newfoundland and the Dominion of Newfoundland before Newfoundland became Canada's tenth province in 1949. The city now serves as the capital of Newfoundland and Labrador; therefore, the provincial legislature is in the city. The Confederation Building, on Confederation Hill, is home to the House of Assembly along with the offices for the Members of the House of Assembly (MHAs) and Ministers. The city is represented by nine MHAs, five who are members of the governing Liberal Party, two that belong to the New Democratic Party (NDP), one that belongs to the Progressive Conservative Party, and one independent.

St. John's is represented in the House of Commons by three members of Parliament. Liberal Joanne Thompson represents St. John's East, Liberal Tom Osborne represents Cape Spear—Mount Pearl—Paradise, and Liberal Paul Connors represents Avalon.

The Newfoundland and Labrador office for the regional federal minister is in downtown St. John's. Regional offices for Government of Canada departments and agencies are throughout the city.

St. John's federal election results
Year	Liberal		Conservative		New Democratic		Green	
2021	51%	23,622	16%	7,334	31%	14,475	0%	0
2019	43%	23,774	15%	8,204	39%	21,498	2%	1,070
2015	55%	19,793	5%	1,785	39%	13,795	1%	324

St. John's provincial election results
Year	Liberal		PC		New Democratic	
2019	42%	17,178	32%	13,268	23%	9,647
2015	50%	19,142	22%	8,566	28%	10,745

=== Crime ===
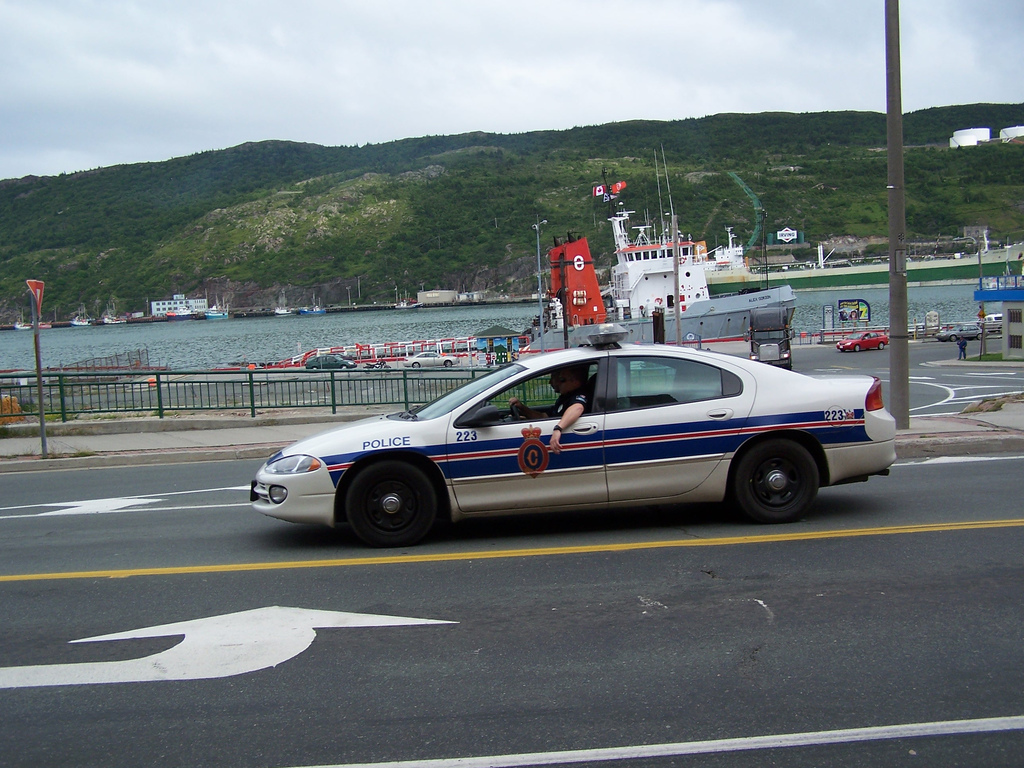
A Royal Newfoundland Constabulary (RNC) police car on patrol. The RNC serves as the primary policing body for the metropolitan area.

Police services for the city are provided by the Royal Newfoundland Constabulary, which serves as the primary policing body of the metropolitan area. The "B" Division headquarters of the Royal Canadian Mounted Police is located in the Pleasantville neighbourhood; however, the RCMP primarily operate in rural Newfoundland and Labrador and not St. John's.

St. John's has traditionally been one of the safest cities in Canada to live; however, in recent years, crime in the city has steadily increased. While national crime decreased by 4% in 2009, the total crime rate in St. John's saw an increase of 4%. During this same time, violent crime in the city decreased 6%, compared to a 1% decrease nationally. In 2010, the total crime severity index for the city was 101.9, an increase of 10% from 2009 and 19.2% above the national average. The violent crime severity index was 90.1, an increase of 29% from 2009 and 1.2% above the national average. St. John's had the seventh-highest metropolitan crime index and twelfth-highest metropolitan violent crime index in the country in 2010.

According to Statistics Canada's Juristat reports (1993–2007), the metropolitan area reports an average homicide rate of approximately 1.15 per 100,000 population; an average of two homicides per year. An all-time high rate of 2.27 was reported in 1993 (four homicides). This figure is far below the national average and ranks amongst the lowest rates for any metropolitan area in Canada.

In 2004, a Hells Angel from Montreal, Patrick "Big Pat" Champoux, arrived in St. Johns. Champoux established himself as the most important gangster in St. John's, being involved in a number of assaults and smashing up bars that refused to pay him extortion money. Champoux was sentenced to eight years in prison after his conviction in 2009. However, despite the conviction of Champoux, the Criminal Intelligence Service reported in the same year: "In Newfoundland and Labrador, despite their lack of a physical presence, the Hells Angels continue to exert their criminal influence in this region through associates and/or local criminals". In June 2013, both men wearing "Support 81" T-shirts, Allan Winfield Porter and Bradley John Summers, were arrested in connection with a number of cases of arson, shootings and assaults in St. John's.

== Transportation ==
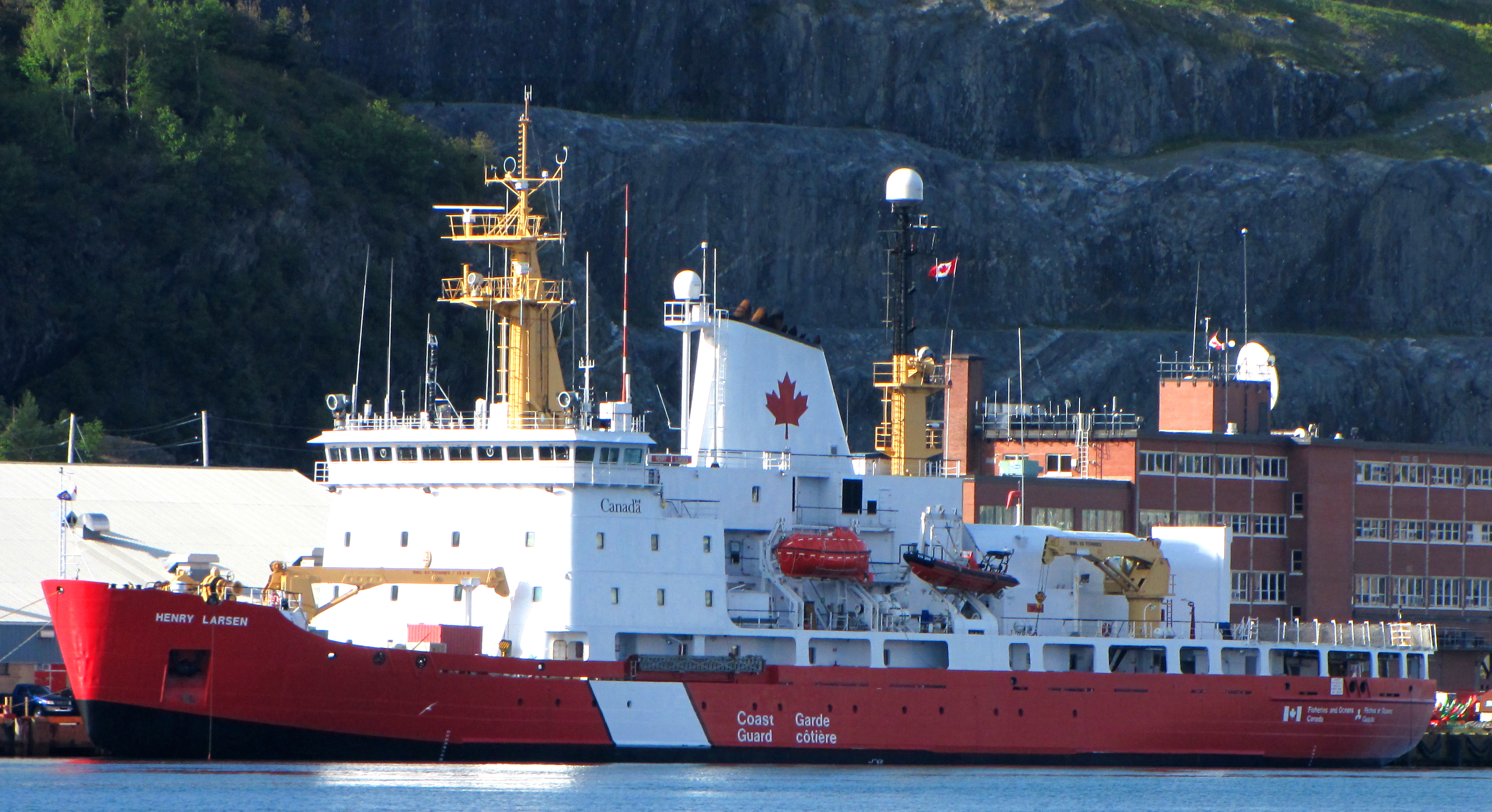
CCGS Henry Larsen in St. John's Harbour, where Canadian Coast Guard vessels use St. John's as a home port

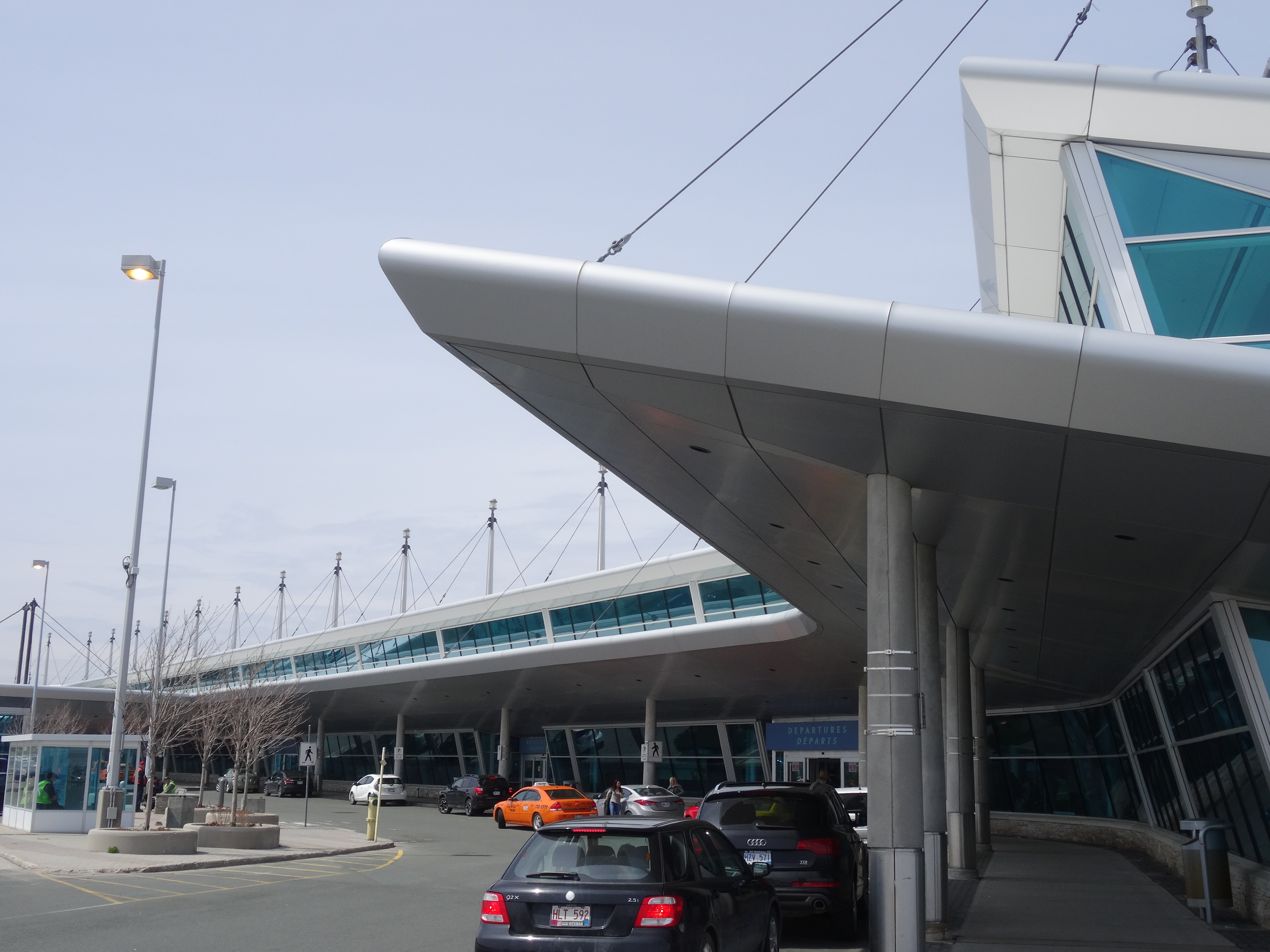
St. John's International Airport serves as the international airport for the metropolitan area. It is the second busiest airport in Atlantic Canada.

St. John's has a substantial harbour. Among other things, the harbour is the base for the following Canadian Coast Guard (CCG) ships: CCGS Ann Harvey – icebreaker, CCGS George R. Pearkes – icebreaker, CCGS Henry Larsen – icebreaker, CCGS Louis S. St-Laurent – icebreaker, CCGS Terry Fox – icebreaker, CCGS Cygnus – patrol vessel, CCGS Leonard J. Cowley – multi role, CCGS Sir Wilfred Grenfell – multi role

=== Airport ===
St. John's is served by St. John's International Airport, located 10 minutes northwest of the downtown core.

=== Highway ===
St. John's is the eastern terminus of the Trans-Canada Highway (Route 1), one of the longest national highways in the world. The divided highway, also known as "Outer Ring Road", runs just outside the main part of the city, with exits to Pitts Memorial Drive (Route 2), Topsail Road (Route 60), Team Gushue Highway (Route 3A), Thorburn Road (Route 50), Allandale Road, Portugal Cove Road (Route 40) and Torbay Road (Route 20), providing relatively easy access to neighbourhoods served by those streets. Pitts Memorial Drive (Route 2) runs from Conception Bay South, through the city of Mount Pearl and into downtown St. John's, with interchanges for Goulds (Routes 3 and 10), The Parkway (Columbus Drive), Water Street and Hamilton Avenue-New Gower Street.

=== Trails ===
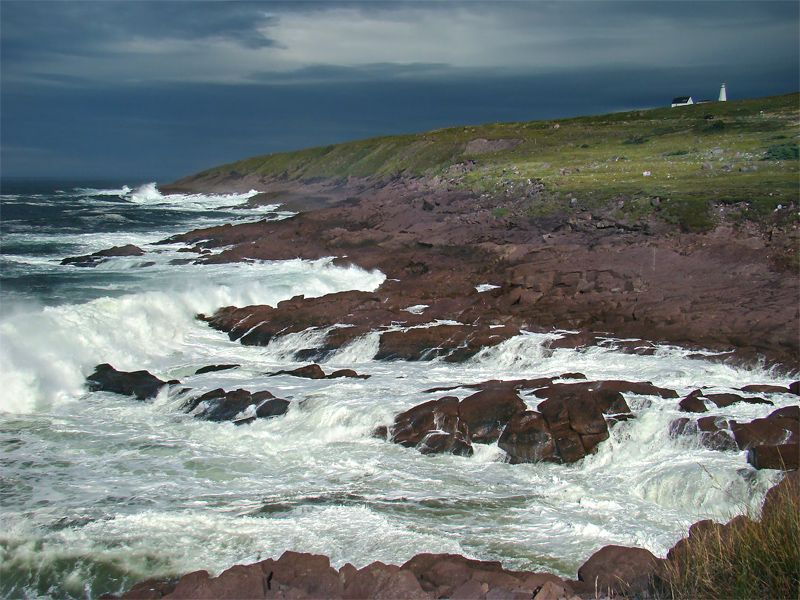
Cape Spear. Two hiking routes pass here.

There are numerous recreational paths in the city, many of which are part the Grand Concourse. The Grand Concourse includes the path around Quidi Vidi Lake, parts of Signal Hill, downtown streets, along river banks, and around other lakes. It also extends into Mount Pearl. There are also many kilometres of path within Signal Hill National Historic Park, the Geo-Vista Park on the lower sloe of Signal Hill, Memorial University of Newfoundland Botanical Garden, and within Pippy Park.

There are also trails used by mountain bikers, trail runners and walkers on the White Hills, behind the Department of Fisheries and Oceans and the RCMP headquarters.

The Trans Canada Trail passes through St. John's. Now starting at Cape Spear, it passes Fort Amherst and the Railway Coastal Museum, which was the original mile zero, before continuing across the Island. The East Coast Trail, also passes through St. John's, coming from Topsail Beach in the north to pass through St. John's via Quidi Vidi, Signal Hill and Water Street before connecting with the Trans Canada Trail at the Railway Coastal Museum, before heading east to Cape Spear, and then continuing south to Cappahayden.

Alleys and stairways provide other traffic-free routes and are part of the city's historic fabric, especially in the downtown area, including the ecclesiastical district.

=== Cycling ===
The St. John's Cycling Master Plan was officially launched in July 2009. Its first phase consists of 43 km (27 mi) of on-road painted bike lanes, signs on an additional 73 km (45 mi) of roadway, the installation of 20 bicycle parking facilities and the addition of bike racks on the fleet of 53 Metrobuses. There are also plans to create a number of shared-use paths, the first of which, the Kelly's Brook Shared-Use Path, opened in 2025.

=== Transit ===
Metrobus Transit is responsible for public transit in the region. Metrobus has a total of 19 routes, 53 buses and an annual ridership of 3,014,073. Destinations include the Avalon Mall, The Village Shopping Centre, Memorial University, Academy Canada, the College of the North Atlantic, the Marine Institute, the Confederation Building, downtown, Stavanger Drive Business Park, Kelsey Drive, Goulds, Kilbride, Shea Heights, the four hospitals in the city as well as other important areas in St. John's and Mount Pearl.

=== Railway ===
St. John's was the eastern terminus of the Newfoundland Railway from 1898 until the abandonment and closure of the railway in September 1988.

== Medical centres and hospitals ==
St. John's is served by NL Health Services, Newfoundland and Labrador's provincial health authority. The city's major hospitals include the Health Sciences Centre, St. Clare's Mercy Hospital, Waterford Hospital and the Janeway Children's Health and Rehabilitation Centre.

== Education ==
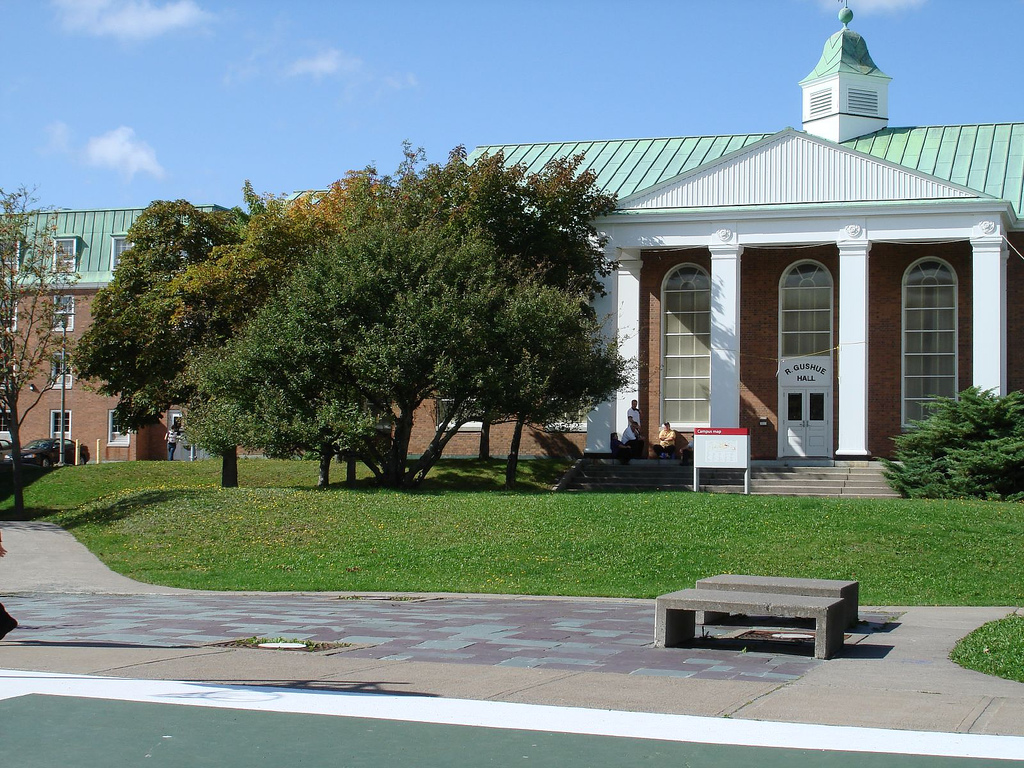
Memorial University of Newfoundland is the largest university in Atlantic Canada by enrolment

There are 32 Anglophone primary, elementary and secondary schools in the city of St. John's, including two private schools. St. John's also has two schools that are part of the province-wide Conseil Scolaire Francophone (CSF), the Francophone public school district. It has two private schools, St. Bonaventure's College and Lakecrest Independent.

The main campus of Atlantic Canada's largest university, Memorial University of Newfoundland (MUN), is in St. John's. There are satellite campuses on Signal Hill, St. John's, and the Ocean Sciences Centre in nearby Logy Bay. The Fisheries and Marine Institute of Memorial University of Newfoundland (MI or simply Marine Institute) is a post-secondary ocean and marine polytechnic in St. John's and is affiliated with Memorial University of Newfoundland. MUN provides comprehensive education and grants degrees, and was one of the top ten comprehensive universities in Canada according to Maclean's in 2021.

The College of the North Atlantic (CNA) is the public college of the province and operates two main campuses in the city. CNA provides career, trade, degree and university-transfer programs for St. John's residents.

The city hosts several private colleges and post-secondary schools; Academy Canada, Eastern College, and Keyin College are the largest of these.

== Media ==
St. John's has one daily newspaper, The Telegram. Other local papers include The Muse, The Gazette, Le Gaboteur, The Scope, The Business Post and The Current. St. John's also receives the nationally distributed newspaper The Globe and Mail.

CJON-DT, known on air as "NTV", is an independent station. The station sublicenses entertainment programming from Global and news programming from CTV and Global, rather than purchasing primary broadcast rights. Rogers Cable has its provincial headquarters in St. John's, and their community channel Rogers TV airs local shows such as Out of the Fog and One Chef One Critic. CBC Television (CBC) has its Newfoundland and Labrador headquarters in the city and their television station CBNT-DT broadcasts from University Avenue.

The city is home to 15 AM and FM radio stations, two of which are French-language stations. The ITU prefix VO was assigned to the Dominion of Newfoundland before the province joined Canadian Confederation in 1949, and three AM stations kept their existing call letters. However, other commercial radio stations in St. John's that went to air after 1949 use the same range of prefixes (CF–CK) currently in use elsewhere in Canada, with the exception of VOCM-FM, which was permitted to adopt the VOCM callsign because of its corporate association with the AM station that bore that callsign. VO remains in use in amateur radio.

== Sister cities ==
- Ílhavo, Portugal
- Waterford, Ireland

== See also ==
- List of municipalities in Newfoundland and Labrador

== Bibliography ==
- Harding, Les (1993). Historic St. John's: The City of Legends. Jesperson. ISBN 0-921692-52-8.
- Galgay, Frank (2001). Olde St. John's: Stories from a Seaport City. St. John's: Flanker.
- Langton, Jerry (2015). Cold War How Organized Crime Works in Canada and Why It's About to Get More Violent. Toronto: HarperColllins. ISBN 978-1-4434-3255-9.
