= Robert Carl Sheppard =

British World War II veteran

Robert Carl Sheppard, MBE (January 31, 1897– December 31, 1954) was a veteran of the Battle of the Somme (Beaumont-Hamel, France) in World War I who worked as a lighthouse keeper at Fort Amherst and was master mariner of two ships, the SS Eagle (1944–1945) and the SS Trepassey (1945–1946), chartered for the secret British Antarctic expedition, Operation Tabarin.

== Family ==
Sheppard was born January 31, 1897 in St. John's, NL, the oldest surviving son of Robert Austin Sheppard, I (1865–1909) and Anna Laura Davis (1871–1935). His father was an experienced master mariner of ships employed in international trade, including the Nelly, famous for setting precedent for maritime law in the sale of minority interest in a ship (The Nelly Schneider, Admiralty, April 4 and 5, 1878, Sir R. Phillimore). In 1906, his mother accompanied his father to Sydney, AU and back, likely bringing at least one of their children on the months-long voyage, infant Louis Wakeham Sheppard (b. 1905). Three years later, on the same ocean trek, somewhere between Brazil and New South Wales, his father disappeared, lost at sea with all crew aboard the Amy Louise, a 2 mast, 200 ton, wood brigantine.

By March 1, 1920, 23-year-old Sheppard was a master mariner when he married 19-year-old Sadie Addison Kean. She was well-aware of the dangers faced by a master mariner as her father (Captain Nathan Barker Kean), grandfather (Captain Abram Kean, OBE), and several of her Kean uncles were well known sealing masters, commemorated in song. Joseph W. Kean, her father's eldest brother, had captained the SS Florizel, but on February 23, 1918, he was on board as a passenger when the Florizel struck a reef in a heavy sea and split in pieces. He suffered a broken leg, was swept overboard, drowned and washed up on shore. On March 15, 1931, her uncle Abraham Baker Kean, captain of the SS Viking, survived injuries when he was catapulted off the bridge by an explosion of dynamite that blew the stern off the vessel, which then caught fire and sank, killing many on board. The film, White Thunder, for which the ship was carrying dynamite to create scenes of icebergs imploding, was edited after the disaster and released as The Viking.

Sheppard's descendants include his son, Robert Austin Sheppard, II who fought with the British 59th (Newfoundland) Heavy Artillery Regiment, his daughter, Edna Patricia Sheppard (1923–1998), born at the Fort Amherst lighthouse, who was a research chemist for the US Food and Drug Administration and taught at Memorial University of Newfoundland, and his great-grandson, Nick Whalen, a Member of Parliament for the riding of St. John's East.

By 1950 the family was living in Sylvanside, the former summer home of the Hon. John Vincent O’Dea and Sheppard's last residence, which overlooks Bowring Park (St. John's) in the historic Kilbride neighborhood.

== Military service ==
Capt. Sheppard was a veteran of the WW1 campaigns in Gallipoli and Beaumont Hamel, serving from September 8, 1914, aged 19 with The First Five Hundred, the Newfoundland Regiment in the British Mediterranean Expeditionary Force. He was evacuated from Suvla Bay for frostbite in December 1915; returned to the regiment, and again extricated for injuries, this time at the Western Front in spring of 1916 for a shrapnel wound to his face.

According to Dickinson, Sheppard served in France with a wiring party, where his nightly mission was to breach or destroy barbed wire obstacles that were created to maim and trap his fellow soldiers. On July 1, 1916, he suffered multiple machine gun shots to the neck, arm and groin in the Battle of the Somme (Beaumont-Hamel, France) and credited Michael Sears for helping save him. Too extensively wounded to return to the field, he was honorably discharged in March 1917.

== Lighthouse service ==
The Oke family oversaw the light at Fort Amherst for nearly a century, beginning circa 1848 with Robert Oke as the first Chief Inspector for the Newfoundland Lighthouse Service, whose responsibilities were to oversee the budget, staffing and repairs of lighthouses. In 1841, his daughter, Mary Ann Oke (1819–1896), married John Sheppard (1816–1890), an assistant lighthouse keeper at Harbour Grace Island since 1836, and they moved to manage the Fort Amherst lighthouse in 1852. They passed down the lighthouse trade through another 3 generations: their son, Austin Oke Sheppard (1844–1927); grandson, Robert Austin Sheppard, I (1865–1909); and, great-grandson, Sheppard, whose keeper service spanned 14 years from 1924 to 1938. However, Sheppard's young family was residing at the lighthouse earlier than the official start of his keeper's service, at least by 1923 when his daughter was born.

In September 1934, keeper Sheppard hosted Sir John Hope Simpson, KBE CIE OBJ (1868–1961) and Lady Quita Hope Simpson (1870–1939) for tea and a tour of the lighthouse. Sheppard's mother "Annie" was living with him at the Fort Amherst lighthouse at the time of her death in 1935, as was Sheppard's only sister, Edna Sheppard (1898–1988), who was a telephone operator in the Office of the Colonial Secretary, including for the Hon. Arthur Barnes.

Fort Amherst was designated one of the National Historic Sites of Canada in 1951.

== Mariner and harbor master ==
Despite losing his father at an early age to the sea, Sheppard followed in his footsteps, pursuing a career as captain of a square rig. Dickinson suggests he was mentored by his uncle, the locally renowned master mariner Captain Robert Whiting Wakeham, who was decorated numerous times for heroism at sea. According to Horwood, "... in Newfoundland, there were three classes of men that were respected above all others. The first was the man who had become the captain of a square rigger; the second a school teacher; the third a ship owner.”

Recommended by the military for navigation and seamanship studies, Sheppard sailed to the Caribbean and Mediterranean on schooners carrying salt fish in one direction and returning to Newfoundland with rum, molasses and other products. During the Second World War he served as a British merchant navy master in transatlantic convoys. After the fall of France, he brought confiscated French ships across the Atlantic and in 1940 he survived the Swansea Blitz and the bombing of a convoy by Germany.

In 1944, he accepted a position as the harbor master in St. John's, NL, but just months later Bowring Brothers, owner of a number of sealing vessels, recommended him to the Operation Tabarin committee. As the holder of master's tickets in both sail and steam, he was qualified to command such a mission.

== Operation Tabarin ==
Sheppard commanded two ships, the SS Eagle (1944–1945) and the SS Trepassey (1945–1946), both chartered by Britain for the Falkland Islands Dependencies Survey (FIDS) during exploration of the Antarctic in Operation Tabarin. Sheppard personally selected his crew of twenty-seven Newfoundlanders, most with decades-long experience working in ice.

The Eagle left St. John's on October 24, 1944, and by the end of the year had made it to the port of Rio de Janeiro, Brazil After a stop in Montevideo, Uruguay they reached Port Stanley (Falkland Islands) in January 1945. Loaded with supplies, the Eagle set off on the 600 mile crossing, but hit a blizzard and a gale approaching Deception Island (South Shetland Islands). During one particularly hard and sudden lurch of the vessel in the storm, Sheppard fell off the bridge onto the deck, breaking 3 ribs and was temporarily knocked unconscious. Despite constant pain that curtailed his movement, he managed to steer the vessel for several trips between Deception Island and Hope Bay (Antarctic Peninsula), dodging calving icebergs, and working with the crews of the William Scoresby and Fitzroy to establish Base D at Hope Bay on February 12, 1945. They delivered the shore party, huskies, construction materials and all manner of cargo needed for research and survival.

On March 17, 1945, another hurricane raged over Hope Bay, with a force that snapped the Eagle’s anchor and drove the vessel into a massive iceberg, then into a second iceberg, and came close to colliding with a third. Due to the damaged stern and bow, the blinding snow and gale-force winds, Sheppard was preparing the men to beach the ship and swim to shore. However, the clouds lifted, the wind abated, good sight lines were restored, and he steered the Eagle for Port Stanley. The ship was repaired sufficiently to reach Uruguay for a substantial overhaul. The voyage resumed to Brazil, British Guiana, and Trinidad. It was here that Sheppard turned over the ship to another captain as he had orders to fly back to St. John's to outfit a ship to replace the damaged Eagle. On Sunday, July 23, 1950, the S.S. Eagle, dressed with a string of flags, was towed through The Narrows, St. John's and scuttled (intentionally sunk) off Sugarloaf Head, NL in the vicinity of Cordelia Deeps.

The second ship charted by the British Admiralty FIDS, was the Trepassey, obtained from the Newfoundland Railway. Sheppard steered from St. John's on November 20, 1945, with his wife Sadie and son, seaman Robert Austin Sheppard, II, on board. Due to wretched conditions, including rotting whale meat, Sadie stayed in Montevideo when the crew headed south. Again working with the local Fitzroy and the William Scoresby, Sheppard relieved the men and re-equipped the bases at Hope Bay, Deception Island and Port Lockroy aided by a nautical chart drawn from a hydrographic survey. Conducted at his request, data were obtained the previous winter by taking depth soundings through holes cut in the ice. Then they established Base C at Cape Geddes on Laurie Island, South Orkneys in January 1946, restocked Base A at Port Lockroy and deposited emergency supplies at the closed Base C at Sandefjord Bay and at an abandoned hut on Winter Island, Argentine Islands. The Trepassey was the lone ship used to set up Base E, so they packed up as much supplies as the vessel could haul, 46 Labrador huskies, and the research personnel and steered further south to Marguerite Bay, Stonington Island, where offloading continued from February into March 1946. After this, the ship and crew made ten trips to jettison 1000 tons of surplus war bombs, anti-aircraft shells, depth charges and small arms ammunition into the sea. While returning to St. John's, Sheppard was informed by radio that he was a recipient of the Member of the Order of the British Empire (MBE) award. After the 9-month expedition, the Trepassey steamed into St. John's harbor in July 1946, completing its British charter.

Dickinson and Taylor, both credit Sheppard and his crew's devotion to duty in the face of personal adversity as contributing significantly to the establishment of new bases to expand scientific and surveying programs for the FIDS and Operation Tabarin.

== Legacy ==
Sheppard was a 5th generation Newfoundland lighthouse keeper and, along with his son, were the last known descendants of Robert Oke to officially practice the trade. He was commemorated in the poem, Fort Amherst - Then and Now, by Rosalind Power, who grew up at Fort Amherst, where her father was a lighthouse keeper (1949–1972).

Sheppard is listed on the nominal roll of those serving with the Royal Newfoundland Regiment who were wounded during the Battle of the Somme at Beaumont Hamel in 1916. Every July 1, people gather at the National War Memorial (Newfoundland) to remember Sheppard and others who served.

While at Hope Bay, Sheppard became the first Newfoundlander to visit the ruins of a stone shelter built by the Swedish Antarctic Expedition in 1903. Now Historic Monument 39 (HSM 39), it is maintained by Instituto Antártico Argentino.

In his book and collected documents, the expedition's lead surveyor (1943–1946) and second commander (1945–1946), Andrew Taylor, placed several landmarks and photographs at or near "Sheppard Island", next to "Marr Island" (named by the expedition after Sheppard and expedition commander (1943–1944) and zoologist, Lt. Cmdr. J.W.S. Marr, RNVR, respectively). Although these namesakes were not officially sanctioned by The UK Antarctic Place-names Committee, other locations were. Two points of land were named for Capt. Sheppard, Sheppard Nunatak and Sheppard Point, both at the north entrance of Hope Bay, Trinity Peninsula, Graham Land. Furthermore, a cove on Hope Bay and an adjacent island, were named after the Eagle. Similarly, a bay on the Tabarin Peninsula and an island near Stonington Island were named after the ship Trepassey. Five postage stamps commemorate the ships under Sheppard's command during the mission, two of the Eagle, and three of the Trepassey.

A tribute to Sheppard was published in the June 21, 1945, edition of the newspaper, Hope Bay Howler, edited by medical officer, Eric Back: "... did not Capt. Sheppard prove conclusively within the spell of four short weeks that he was well worthy to be listed among the great seamen of the Antarctic? Cook, Bransfield, James Weddell, the redoubtable James Clark Ross, Larsen the Swede, David the Australian and now Sheppard of Newfoundland".
