= The Battery, St. John's =

Coordinates: 47°34′08.01″N 52°41′25.49″W

The Battery
- Neighbourhood
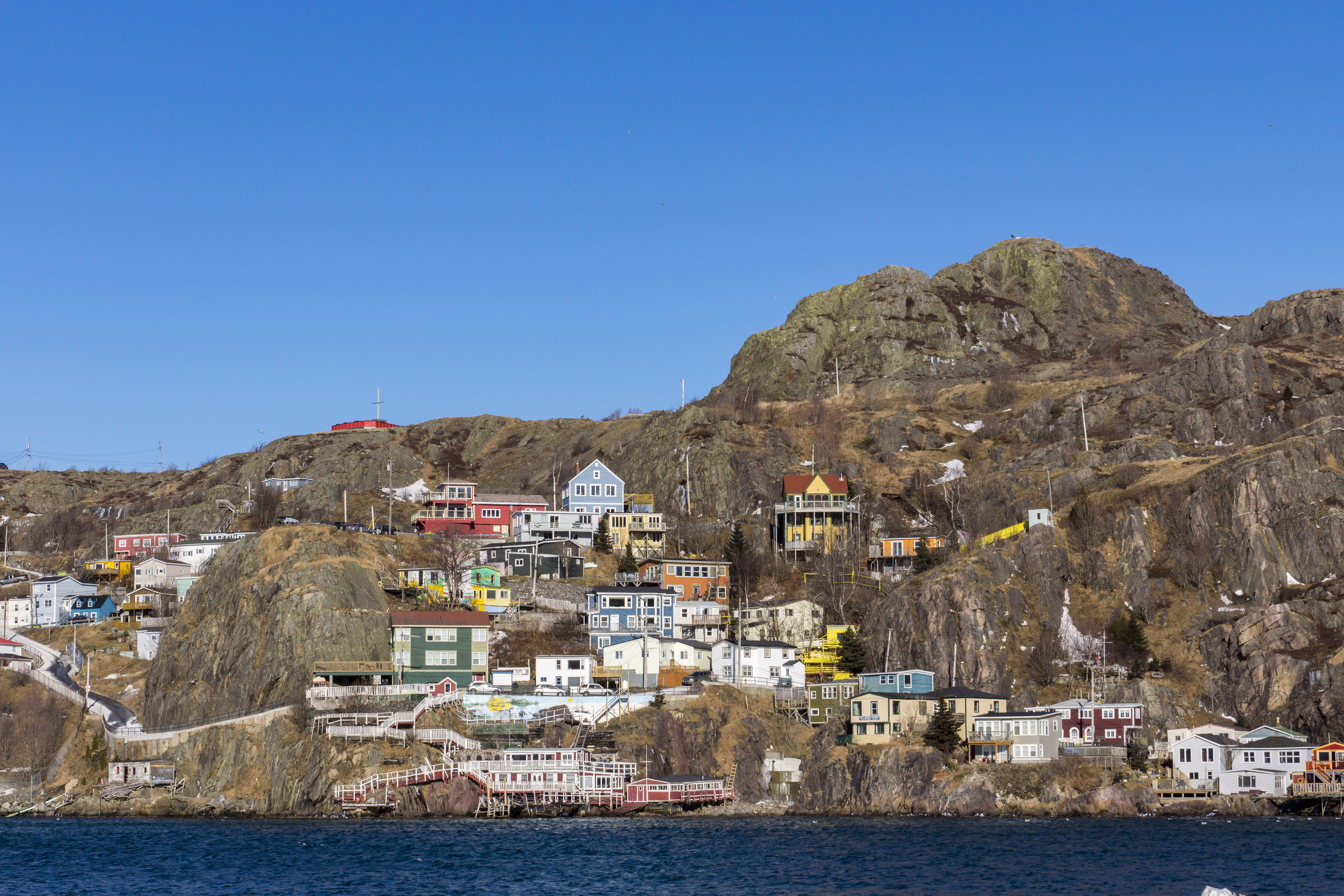

- Location within Newfoundland
- Country: Canada
- Provinces and territories of Canada: Newfoundlandand Labrador
- City: St. John's
- Ward: 2

Government
  - Administrative body: St. John's City Council
  - Councilor: Ophelia Ravencroft

The Battery is a neighbourhood within the city of St. John's, Newfoundland and Labrador that sits on the entrance to the harbour, on the slopes of Signal Hill. It is sometimes described as an outport within the city of St. John's and is noted for its steep slopes, and colourful houses. The Battery has been the site, over the centuries, for gun emplacements (batteries), such as Fort Waldegrave, for the defence of St. John's Harbour, including during both World Wars.

== Chain Rock ==
It is home to Chain Rock, a land outcropping to which a large chain was attached connecting to Fort Amherst, since as early as 1770, to prevent the entry of enemy ships into St John's harbour. Chain Rock is one of two rocks located on opposite sides of the Narrows, the aptly named entrance to the harbour; Pancake Rock is on the opposite shore. The space between the two rocks is 174 metres. A defensive chain was stretched between the rocks by means of a capstan at nightfall. During World War I and II the chain was replaced with anti-submarine nets.

== Avalanches & landslides ==
Minor landslides have been frequent in the area's past. There have also been small number of avalanches in the Battery. There were three avalanches in the 20th century involving loss of life or serious injury: two in February 1921, and one February 1959.

A list of major avalanches includes:

Date of avalanche	Homes destroyed	Human losses
February 8, 1921	One occupied; numerous unoccupied	Two severe injuries
February 18, 1921	One home destroyed	One death
February 16, 1959	Two homes destroyed	Five deaths; multiple injuries
January 17, 2020	One home damaged	None

Although no major events have occurred between 1959 and 2020, in 1995 the city of St. John's began studying the area in an attempt to minimize risk associated with rock slides and avalanches. The Canadian Avalanche Association conducted studies in the area; based on their work, the city spent an estimated $300,000 to protect the area from further instability. Despite this a house was badly damaged by an avalanche in January 2020, following a record snowfall and hurricane force winds.

The Battery, overlooking St. John's Harbour

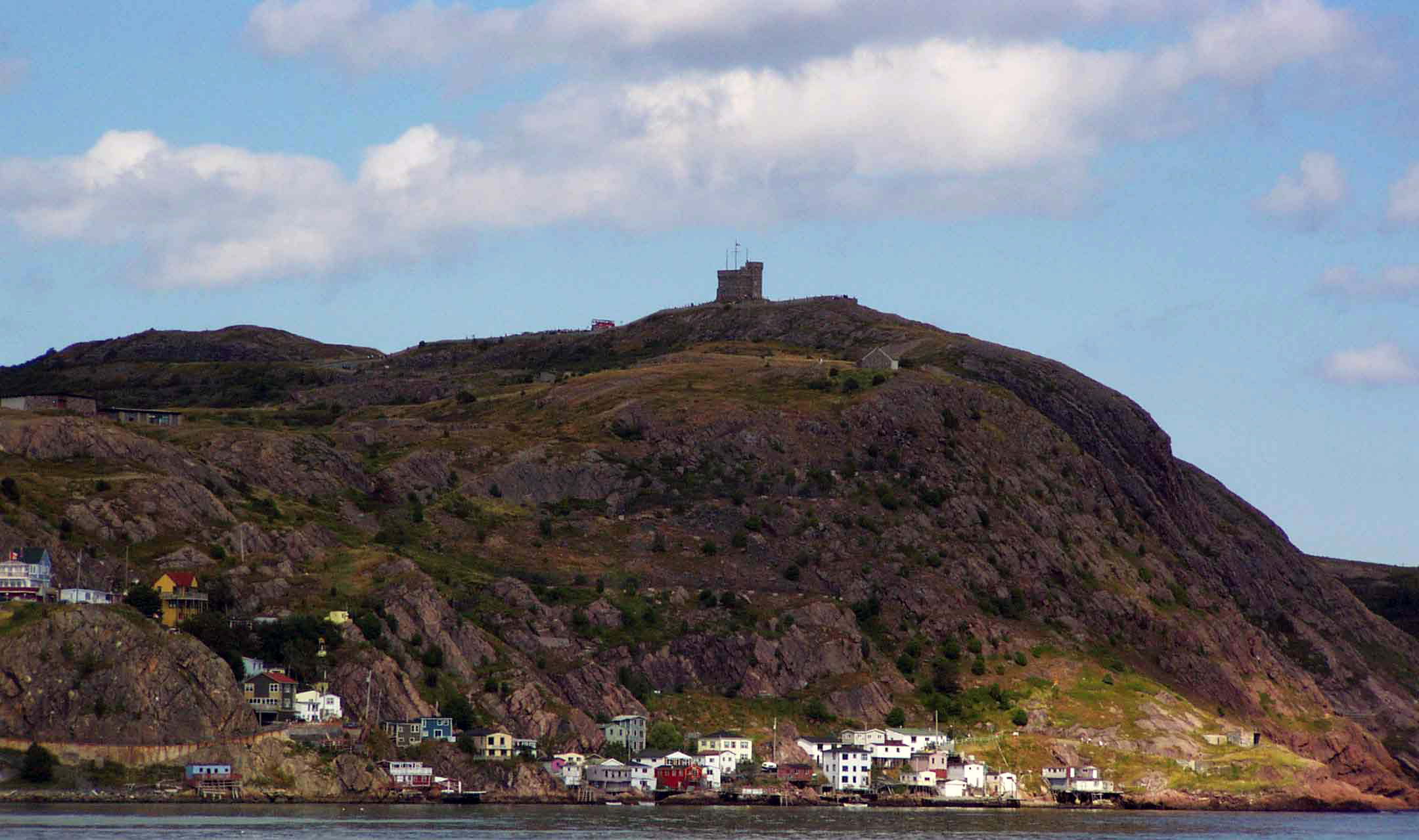
Picture of The Battery and Signal Hill, St. John's

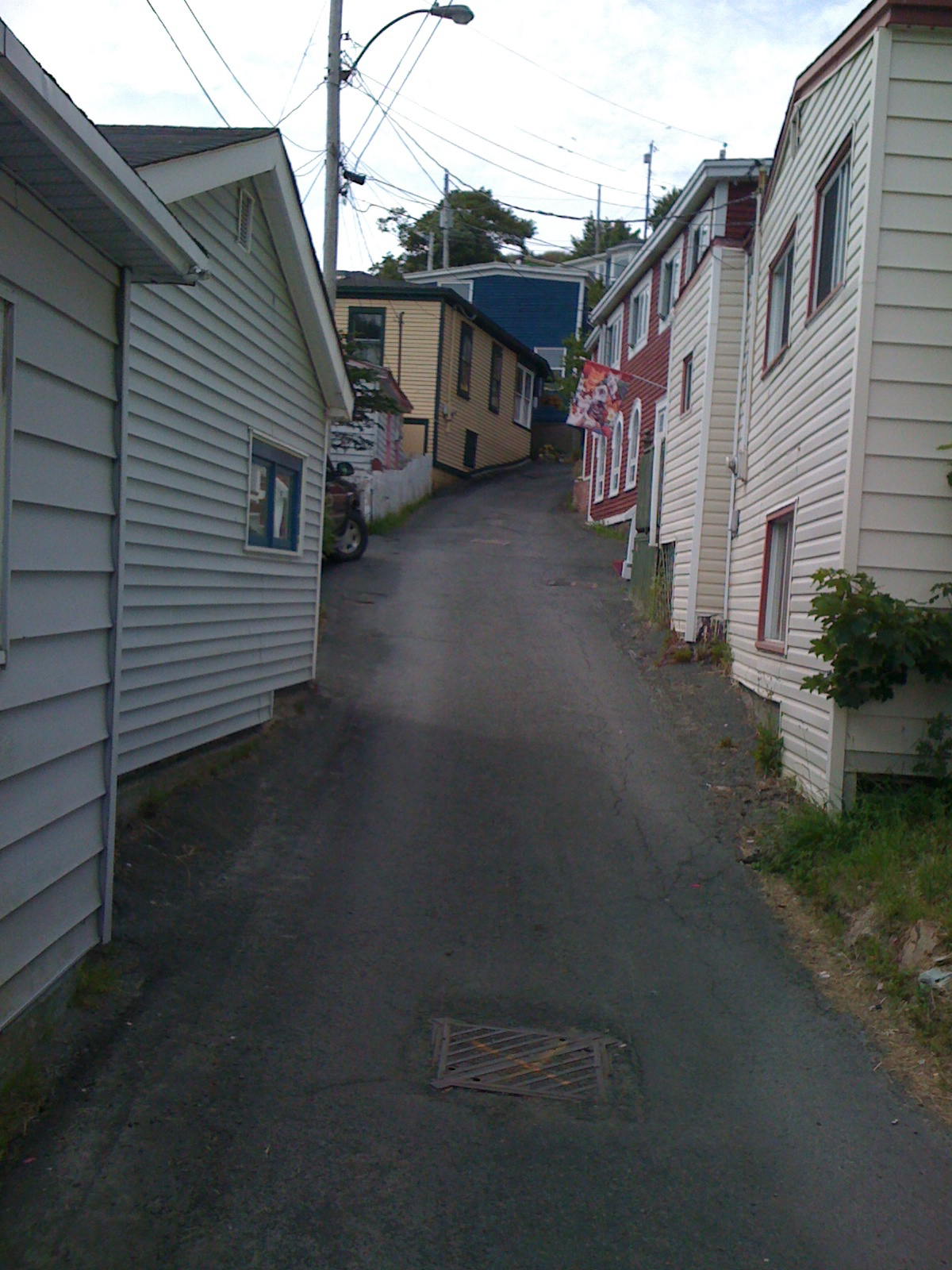
Street in The Battery

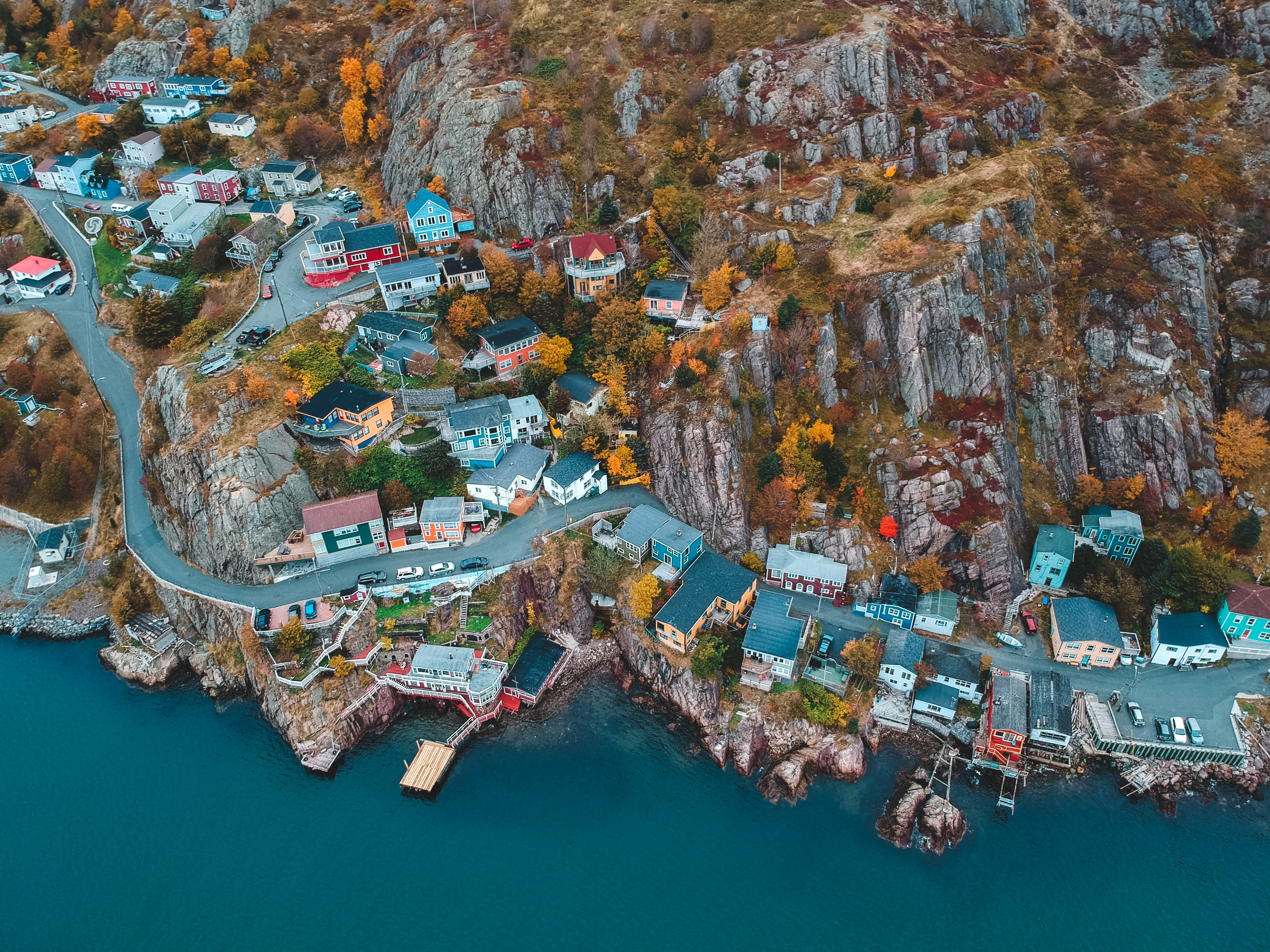
An aerial view of The Battery

== Notables ==
- Frank Maher (musician), button accordionist

== See also ==
- Neighbourhoods in St. John's, Newfoundland and Labrador
