= List of lighthouses in Newfoundland and Labrador =

This is a list of lighthouses in the province of Newfoundland and Labrador in Canada.

Name	Image	Water body	Region	Location	Built	Notes
Bacalhao Island Light						
Baccalieu Island Light						
Bay Bulls Light						
Bear Cove Point Light						
Bell Island Light						
Belle Island South End Lights						
Belle Isle Northeast Light						
Belleoram Light						No longer standing
Boar Island Light						Historic light is no longer standing. Replaced with a 1990s-style steel tower.
Brigus Light						
Broad Cove Point Range Lights						
Brunette Island Light						No longer standing
Burnt Point Light						
Cabot Islands Light						
Camp Islands Light						
Cape Anguille Light						
Cape Bauld Light						
Cape Bonavista Light						
Cape Norman Light						
Cape Pine Light						
Cape Race Light						
Cape Ray Light						
Cape Spear Light (old)						
Cape Spear Lighthouse (new)						
Cape St. Mary's Light						
Change Islands Light						No longer standing
Channel Head Light						
Colombier Islands Light						No longer standing
Conche Light						
Cow Head Light						
Dawson Point Light						
Double Island Light						
English Harbour West Light						No longer standing
Ferryland Head Light						
Flowers Island Light						
Fort Amherst Light						
Fort Point Light (Newfoundland)						
Fortune Head Light						
Fox Point Light						
François Bay Light			South Coast	Francois		Standing. Accessible by 6 km round trip hike over barrens on unmarked path.
Frenchman's Head Light						No longer standing
Garnish Light						
Grand Bank Light						
Green Island Light (Catalina)						
Green Island Light (Fortune Bay)						No longer standing
Green Point Light						
Gull Island Light						
Hants Harbour Light						
Harbour Grace Harbour Light						
Harbour Grace Islands Light						No longer standing
Harbour Point Light						
Heart's Content Light						
Ireland Island Light						No longer standing
Keppel Island Light						
Kings Cove Head Light						
La Haye Point Light						
Little Burin Island Light						Demolished in the 2010s.
Little Denier Island Light						
Lobster Cove Head Light						
Long Island East End Light						This Notre Dame Bay lighthouse was demolished ~2005.
Long Island Light (Newfoundland)						This Placentia Bay Lighhtouse was demolished ~2005. The lantern room is now in a park in Petite Forte, Newfoundland and Labrador
Long Point Lighthouse						
Manuel Island Light (Labrador)						No longer standing, replaced by a small fiberglass tower
Manuel Island Light (Newfoundland)						
Marticot Island Light						
Middle Head Light						
New Férolle Peninsula Light						
North Penguin Island Light						No longer standing
Northwest Head Light						
Offer Wadham Island Light						
Pack's Harbour Light						No longer standing, replaced by a small fiberglass tower
Peckford Island Light						
Point Amour Lighthouse						
Point Latine Light						No longer standing
Point Verde Light						
Point Riche Lighthouse						
Powles Head Light						
Puffin Island Light						
Random Head Harbour Light						
Red Island Light						No longer standing, replaced by a skeletal tower
Rocky Point Light						
Rose Blanche Light						
Saddle Island Light						No longer standing
Salmon Point Light						
Sandy Point Island Light						No longer standing, replaced by a skeletal tower
Sloop Harbour Point Light						No longer standing, replaced by a skeletal tower
South Head Light (Newfoundland and Labrador)						No longer standing
St. Jacques Island Light						
St. Lawrence Point Light						No longer standing
St. Modeste Island Light						
Surgeon Cove Point Light						
Tides Cove Point Light						
Westport Cove Light						
White Point Light						No longer standing, replaced by a skeletal tower
Winsor Harbour Island Light						No longer standing
Woody Point Light						
