= Robert Oke =

Newfoundland lighthouse inspector (1794–1870)

Robert Oke, H.M. (23 September 1794 – 18 October 1870) was the first chief inspector for the Newfoundland Lighthouse Service and served from at least 1848 to 1870. Oke installed the first light mechanism (from Bell Rock Lighthouse) at the Cape Bonavista Light in 1842, and installed the famous Isle of May light mechanism at the Cape Pine Light in 1850, which was later moved to Harbour Grace Island and finally to Cape Bonavista, where it can be viewed today.

== Early life ==
Robert Oke was born 23 September 1794 in England to John Whitehead Oke (1751–1805) and his second wife, Edith Cogan (1766–1842) of Taunton, Somerset.

The Oke family were well established in Sherborne, England, residing there for at least three centuries, primarily in The Green (upper end of Cheap Street), at Barton Farm (Kitt Hill, aka Kithill), at Newland House (now "The Manor House" and current location of the Town Council), along Westbury Street at Primsley Manor in the vicinity of Knapped Hall (Knappid Hall) and by 1630 they were also well-settled in near-by Sturminster Newton. Several Okes served as governors and wardens of the Sherborne School, masters and submasters of The Almshouse of St. John the Baptist and St. John the Evangelist (which is still in use), and subwardens of Foster's School a Bluecoat school.

Several Sherborne landmarks bore the family name: water grist mills on the River Yeo (South Somerset) in Westbury, known from the 16th century as Oke's Mills, and two others at the lower end of South Street from the 17th century (other times known as St Andrews Mills or Middle Mill); and, Oke's Mill Bridge, which prior to the turnpike trusts was the primary crossing of the River Yeo for the north–south route to Dorchester.

Oke's grandfather, also Robert Oke (1723–1788), was a Sherborne constable, maltster and innkeeper who helped organize the annual Pack Monday Fair. Also a coach-master, he drove the stagecoach, New Fly, on a section of the route between London and Exeter and became the principle carrier between Sherborne and Bristol in the mid-to-late 18th century. His primary place of business in Sherborne was the Half Moon Inn from which he operated a coach service and supplied wine to the church and distributed beer. He also leased tenements in The Church House (Half Moon Street) and, from circa 1750 until his death, leased what is now Sherborne's oldest existing pub, The George Hotel on upper Cheap Street (its courtyard stood in what is now George Street), next-door to the former Hospice of Saint Julian.

Oke's father, John, was a coach-master and a waggoner (transported goods in a horse-drawn cart). After moving to Bath, Somerset, he became a corn merchant and had difficulty paying tax on the portion of Durnford property he inherited in Sherborne while trying to support his family of 5 young children and first wife, Dinah. John resumed paying land tax in Sherborne during his second marriage, when Oke was 5 years old, the year he was baptized (7 January 1799) at Sherborne Abbey (The Abbey Church of St. Mary the Virgin). By July 1805, John was ill and died in October (after Oke's 11th birthday). He was laid to rest at Sherborne Abbey, as had preceding generations of Oke family.

Oke's half-brother, Edward Langdon Oke (1775–1840), a corn merchant, migrated to Southampton and operated a business on High Street. He was elected to the Southampton town council (common council), appointed consul at Southampton for the Kingdom of Hanover by Prince Regent George IV in 1818, and was active in establishing the Hampshire Advertiser newspaper (previously the "Herald").

Oke's half-brother John Langdon Oke (1776–1812) joined the Royal Navy in 1790. He served aboard HMS Prince during the mutiny at Spithead (16 April to 15 May 1797) and as a master's mate on HMS Dryad (1795), under the command of Captain Charles John Moore Mansfield, apprehending French privateers along the Irish coast and blockading Swedish and Portuguese merchant ships. In 1803, he was aboard HMS Ardent (1796) chasing the French corvette Bayonnaise in Finisterre Bay, Spain, and was on HMS Avon (1805) when it captured the Frisken in the Mediterranean on 7 May 1805. On 12 April 1807, heading out from Dover to return to HMS Skylark (1806), Lieutenant Oke and crew of the jolly boat went overboard, surviving 40 minutes in "a heavy sea" until rescued by a pilot boat. Lieut. Oke returned to service in 1807, briefly appointed to HMS Sultan (1807), then on HMS Loire under command of Alexander Wilmot Schomberg (24 February 1774 – 13 January 1850), when he sailed as far as 77° 30' N to protect the Greenland fishery. His first land post was with the Sea Fencibles, a naval militia (disbanded February 1810). He was appointed to command the La Moye signal station in Saint Brélade parish (Island of Jersey), where he died 1 March 1812.

== Early career ==
In 1811, Oke embarked for Burin in the British Colony of Newfoundland to work for the English company Spurrier, Jolliffe and Spurrier. The third partner in that firm, William Jubber Spurrier, Esq. was a member of one of Poole's leading Newfoundland merchant families who married Oke's cousin, Susan Oke. Her father, also named Robert Oke (1747–1810), was a freemason in the Durnovarian Lodge, Dorchester where he served as a commissioner for captured vessels. In 1789, Oke's uncle attended to the business of Samuel Spratt (a Poole merchant) in Mortier Bay on the Burin Peninsula. During Oke's youth, his uncle developed several partnerships: two firms engaged in the corn trade and in commission benefits (Graves, Oke and Co. in Southampton; Oke, Gaden, and Co. in Poole); an interest in the coal trade with Gaden, Aldridge and Adey; and was in business with John Jeffrey (c. 1751–1822) in the firm Jeffery, Oke, and Blake. Jeffrey was a Member of Parliament for Poole (1796–1808) and its mayor in 1798. After uncle Robert died, his son, William Oke (c. 1787 – 1857), became a burgess of Poole in 1818 and of Southampton in 1821. He served as a sheriff there in 1824, and was a liberal member of the Southampton town council (common council) and a magistrate for several years before becoming the 605th mayor of Southampton in 1831. An original owner of Oak Villa (c. 1835) now, 3 Grosvenor Square and one of the few villas still in use, and an owner of Grosvenor Mews, William Oke then served the rest of his career as Justice of the Peace during the reform instituted by the Municipal Corporations Act 1835.

Oke worked in Burin, NL through the War of 1812, during a time when the Spurrier business was faltering from neglect and failure to diversify. Although the Newfoundland fishery benefited from the strong price of fish during the American War, prices plummeted at war's end. However, employment opportunities rebounded with development of seal hunting and increased demand for fish to supply Europe after The Battle of Waterloo and defeat of Napoleon. Back home in England, business options were less optimistic as Robert's older brother Edward was dealing with decreasing corn prices and the new Corn Laws enacted to stabilize the market. Town's such as Poole, whose economy was largely reliant on migratory fisheries and merchant companies such as Spurrier, had to contend with competition from America, France and Spain's expanded presence across the Newfoundland fisheries. By 1816 (the Year Without a Summer) Oke was working in Little Burin as a boatkeeper (boat-keeper), a term for fishing enterprises that were independent of the large merchants. By 1819, he moved to the port of Harbour Grace in Conception Bay, which was expanding its shipbuilding, fishing and seal oil industries. Opportunities and resources for work were available but competitive and in 1822 Oke had to sue William Warford for encroachment to regain his ground.

By October 1827, Oke was performing customs duties in Harbour Grace. In the mid-19th century, packet boats transported mail, packages and passengers between Harbour Grace and Portugal Cove. One such packet boat, the Express, started service in August 1825 and by 1830 was commanded by Capt. Robert Oke. Although dangerous work, there were six packets, including Oke's, operating out of the area by 1832, the year he registered as captain of the Wave. The most notable cargo of the time was the corpse of Patrick Downing, who was publicly hanged in St. John's on January 5, 1834, for the murder of a schoolteacher, the teacher's son, and a housekeeper. The body was transported among passengers on a packet boat to Harbour Grace, where the crime occurred, then hung in chains, decomposing on a gibbet until disgusted citizens cut it down.

In his new home, Oke participated in civic duties. He served as one of two banner bearers on July 26, 1830, in the formal procession and ceremony to deposit a time capsule of coins and bottled newspapers into the cornerstone of the new courthouse building. The Harbour Grace Court House is the oldest surviving public building in Newfoundland and one of the National Historic Sites of Canada.

Oke joined the Conception Bay Free Masons Association in February 1832, continuing the family tradition of Freemasonry. At that time, Oke was also a donor to the "Harbour Grace Country Association of the Newfoundland and British North America Society for the Education of the Poor".

== Lighthouse service and the English fishery ==
Despite the major wealth from the colony being derived from cod and seal, there were no lighthouses protecting ships off the coast until the 19th century, making these industries dangerous for merchants and crew and unpredictably hazardous for everyday travelers commuting to Newfoundland outports.

As early as March 1831, there was a lighthouse structure manned by Oke on Harbour Grace Island, pre-dating the government funded structure that was erected in 1836 and that Oke manned when it was made operational on 20 November 1837. According to Molloy, "A mechanic by trade, Robert Oke was an excellent choice for the isolated lighthouse situated on the rocky island that lay just off the entrance to Harbour Grace harbor. For years, he had worked with several fish merchants in Harbour Grace and knew the coastal waters of Conception Bay very well."

In May 1842, Thomas Bennett, chairman of the Newfoundland Lighthouse Board, recruited Oke to superintend the installation of Cape Bonavista Light. The lighting apparatus was the second-ever revolving mechanism developed in Scotland, put in operation at the Bell Rock Lighthouse in 1811. It used parabolic reflectors to magnify the illumination of lamps fueled by sperm oil and alternated red and white light, a pattern designed for greatest effect by Robert Stevenson. The light sat 150 feet above the medium sea level and could be seen by ships within 18 nautical miles.

In February 1846, Governor John Harvey employed Oke, now a harbourmaster, to protect the English fishery. Oke took command of the armed schooner Caledonia, outfitted as a revenue cutter, from which he was to collect duty and supervise the trade in bait fish (prevent smuggling by the French) on the western coast under the provisions of the Pickled Fish Act. Oke's report of his experience was republished by the United States Senate in its deliberations on the rights of countries fishing along the North American coast. Oke held this position only through 1847 as the general consensus was that local communities were complicit and reliant on the sale of fish to the French, the Act having the unintended consequence of driving up the price paid.

By September 1848 Oke was serving as the first Chief Inspector for the Newfoundland Lighthouse Service. He worked from the newly built Colonial Building when he wasn't traveling for inspections or supervising installations on remote sites. According to Molloy, the board "needed someone who had a keen understanding of technology and an appreciation of the day to day operations of the lighthouses themselves."

In 1854, Oke published a book on international lighthouses of historical significance, compiled a booklet of drawings of Cape Spear Light in 1856, and published 2 books of early Newfoundland lighthouse designs in 1860 and 1861, with a revised edition of the latter in 1865.

Oke oversaw the maintenance, staffing and budget of 13 lighthouses in the colony, 9 of which (beginning with Cape Pine Light), were completed under his watch. He drafted standards of conduct for the positions of keeper and assistant keeper and periodically monitored performance in maintaining the lights to enforce these standards. He advised in the site selection for new lights. For example, in May 1863 he traveled to Brunet Island with Captain John Orlebar, R.N. (successor to Admiral Henry Wolsey Bayfield, R.N.) on the surveying steamer, Margaretta Stevenson to assess the best location. Oke also weighed in on building materials, such as firmly advising against the continued use of lower-cost iron towers as not suitable for Newfoundland, citing the example of Cape Race Lighthouse in 1856 whose living quarters he deemed uninhabitable due to condensation and hoarfrost. A Canadian engineer, G. F. Baillarge, visiting 10 y later, supported Oke's assessment. Oke routinely assessed the mariner's need for alterations in lighting patterns, making adjustments in the number of reflectors and lamps or the sequencing of the light apparatus.

Oke was involved with site selection and plans for two other lighthouses, Ferryland Head Light and Powles Head Lighthouse, but did not live to see them lit.

== Family in the lighthouse service ==
Within several years of working in Burin, Oke married Ann Wagg (c. 1796–1853). On 18 August 1832, a fire burned through a large portion of Harbour Grace where Oke had relocated, leaving the family, now with 8 children (8 mo to 16 y of age), homeless. The Oke's raised 9 children to adulthood.

Mary Ann Oke (1819–1886) married John Sheppard (1816–1890), an assistant lighthouse keeper with Oke at Harbour Grace Island since 1836. In 1852, Sheppard was assigned as keeper at Fort Amherst, and held this post at The Narrows, St. John's for the rest of his career (through 1887). Oke's grandchildren and great-great-grandchildren maintained the light at Fort Amherst for nearly a century. Although the intent of the fort was military defense of the harbor, maintaining the light was critical for safe navigation along the coast and into the major international port at St. John's. In one year alone, the port harbored 89 ships from Spain, Holland, Germany, Portugal and the United States and was the home port for 600 Newfoundland vessels employed in foreign trade. During 1863, Oke reported several concerns regarding gunners of the Royal Artillery stationed at the fort who were responsible for discharging the foghorn when Cape Spear was shrouded, including positioning the gun, whose forceful blasts were damaging the lighthouse windows and were likely to harm the lighting apparatus. One documented example of the military's lax handling of explosives described a detonation so powerful that the blast wave propelled keeper Sheppard from a chair to the other end of the room. Austin Oke Sheppard (1844–1927) assisted his father in maintaining the light from age 16 y, and after a post as head keeper at Green Island Light, Catalina Harbor, Trinity Bay, he returned to Fort Amherst in 1868 to assist his ailing father, whose health was impaired by round-the-clock maintenance of the Argand burner. He was then assigned as acting head keeper at Dodding Head, Great Burin Island Light (from 1870), promoted to head keeper at Cape Spear (1881–1887), and assigned again to Fort Amherst, this time as head keeper (1887–1924). In 1891, Austin Oke Sheppard's daughter, Mary Ann Harriet Oke Sheppard, married Captain Robert Whiting Wakeham, a well-known master mariner, decorated numerous times for heroism at sea. On 8 July 1892, Sheppard docked the station's boat at Queen's Wharf (St. John's, NL), where it burned to its waterline as the Great Fire of 1892 swept through the city and he found another means of escape. Upon Sheppard's retirement, Oke's great-great-grandson, Captain Robert Carl Sheppard (1897–1954), filled the keeper position (1924–1939). Capt. Sheppard was a veteran of the WW1 campaign in Turkey, serving from 19 y of age with The First Five Hundred of the Newfoundland Regiment in the British Mediterranean Expeditionary Force at Gallipoli and was later wounded in the Battle of the Somme (Beaumont-Hamel, France). He commanded two ships for Britain, the S.S. Eagle and S.S. Trepassey, during exploration of the Antarctic in Operation Tabarin II. There are two points of land named for Capt. Sheppard as well as a cove and island on the Antarctic Peninsula named after Eagle. Fort Amherst was designated one of the National Historic Sites of Canada in 1951.

In May 1848, son Edward Langdon Oke (1825–1862), replaced Oke as head keeper at Harbour Grace Island due to Oke's ill health at that time. Edward, was also a harbor pilot, and became a local legend in 1859 as the winning coxwain in the whaleboat race that inspired the annual regatta in Harbour Grace. For this honor, he was inducted into the Harbour Grace Sports Hall of Fame in 1989. Edward drowned with Nathaniel Snow (assistant lighthouse keeper) after they fell through ice near Salvage Rock on their way to the lighthouse in February 1862. Because Oke and son Edward were freemasons, Oke was able to apply to the newly established Patrick Tasker Masonic Educational Fund to cover educational expenses for Edward's two school-aged children, Edith and John. Oke's grandson, John Langdon Oke (1854–1928), wed Mary Winifred Sheppard, whose father, Nathaniel Sheppard, was a lighthouse keeper on Harbour Grace Island. John suggested the site for the first civil airport in North America (now the oldest surviving operational airstrip in Canada), from which aviators such as Amelia Earhart embarked across the Atlantic Ocean. In 1951, the early transatlantic flights departing from the Harbour Grace airfield were designated Events of National Historic Significance (Canada). Edward's youngest child, William Austin Oke (1857–1923) was thrice-elected to the Newfoundland House of Assembly and served as a judge of the District Court in the courthouse where Oke had participated in the 1830 parade and ceremony to lay its cornerstone. As part owner of Munn & Oke, Ltd., William published the Harbor Grace Standard newspaper. Three generations of Oke family shepherded the Munn & Oke, Ltd. printing company, hand-operating the historic iron "Washington" printing press, now named "Pitcher Plant Press" and on display in the Queen Elizabeth II Library of the Memorial University of Newfoundland (St. John's, NL).

Amelia Oke (1820–1857) died after a short illness during her first year of marriage. Oke appointed her widowed husband, Peter Woods, to assist the lighthouse keeper at Offer Wadham Lighthouse. Oke promoted Woods to head keeper at Green Island Light, Catalina Harbor, Trinity Bay (the position formerly held by Austin Oke Sheppard), where he remained in charge for 25 y.

Austin Innot Oke (1827–1887) was an agent for the S.S. Lady Le Marchant, the first steam-packet to operate on Conception Bay, which established communication between Harbour Grace, Carbonear, Brigus and Portugal Cove on 11 October 1852. The 115-foot schooner-rigged steamer was named for Margaret Ann, wife of the former governor of Newfoundland, Sir John Le Marchant (British Army officer, born 1803). Later, the vessel joined the United States Revenue Cutter Service as Miami and after a short stint touring federal officials along Mid-Atlantic waterways via its two-cylinder oscillating steam engine, President Abraham Lincoln employed it to conduct a reconnaissance that led to the surrender of Norfolk and destruction of the Confederate battleship, USS Merrimack. By 1860, Austin was an assistant keeper at the Harbour Grace Island lighthouse and promoted to head keeper upon the death of his brother Edward in 1862, although Oke preferred to have his son relocated to a less dangerous post. Austin was initiated as a Freemason the next year and continued to follow in Oke's footsteps, installing the new light at Ferryland Head Lighthouse and repairing lights at other lighthouses. After Oke's death, Austin was promoted as "Mechanician of Lighthouses" for all of Newfoundland, worked as an inspector on behalf of the superintendent, oversaw new construction on site, and trained keepers. The family moved to what is now a historic home at 47 Quidi Vidi Road in St. John's. Austin drowned in 1887 while rowing along the coast to La Poile Bay to reach the newly erected light tower on Ireland Island. One of his 5 children, Robert J. Oke (b. 1863), was an engineer on board the S.S. Erik, a wood steam whaler that was torpedoed on 25 August 1918 by the German submarine SM U-156, and sunk 70 miles off Gallantry Head, St. Pierre (NL); all crew survived.

By 1850 the Oke family was operating a tavern in the Portugal Cove section of the St. John's election district, which was used as a voting booth location for residents. After a long illness, Oke's wife, Ann (57 y), died in Portugal Cove in 1853. On 23 July 1855, Oke married Harriet Grace Furneaux (1805–1899) and by 1864 they were living on Rennies Mill Road in St. John's, now a historic district. Oke is buried beside Ann in the Anglican cemetery on Forest Road, St. John's, as are several of their descendants.

== Other children ==
Oke's eldest child, Edith Oke (1816–1872), born in Little Burin, moved to England to marry Joseph Sandiford, a gunner in the Royal Artillery (Woolwich, England).

John Oke (1821–1844) was a mariner who died after stepping forward to stop a fight among crew on the brig Gulnare when he was hit in the head with a crowbar. He was buried in Leghorn (now Livorno), Italy. At the time of John's death, Oke was still the lighthouse keeper and harbourmaster in Harbour Grace harbor.

Elizabeth Danson Oke (1829–1896) married William Seaward Crossman, who by 1872 was the chief engineer of the steam packet S.S. Ariel. Later he worked for Job Brothers & Co., Limited as chief engineer on the sealing ship, S.S. Neptune, commemorated on a postage stamp, issued September 24, 1975. Their grandson, Major Raymond Danson Fraser (1898–1961) was a chief ranger with the Newfoundland Ranger Force.

Matilda Langdon Julia Oke (1831-1909) married James Halliday, a storekeeper for the merchant P. Rogerson & Son, and moved to Woodside, Queens, Long island.

Oke's youngest child, William Robert Oke (1833–1894), founded a carriage factory in 1856 that was operated by the Oke family for more than a century. First opened in Harbour Grace, it moved to Halifax, NS and by 1879 had relocated in St. John's, NL. Eventually, four sons were employed at W.R. Oke & Sons. The carriage factory was destroyed in the Great Fire of 1892 but was rebuilt and expanded to produce boxcars for R. J. Reid (Hall's Bay line). By 1894, as the J. C. Oke Carriage Factory, the Okes' provided undertaking and funeral services similar to other carriage companies at that time. The business was known for its artistic carriage painting and for constructing the dog-cart presented by the children of Newfoundland, accompanied by the dog Bouncer, to the Duke & Duchess of Cornwall and York (George V) during their royal visit to the colony in 1901. An example of an Oke 19th-century dog-cart (two-wheeled child's carriage) is in the collection of The National Trust Carriage Museum (Devon). A Newfoundland dog, Sable Chief, bred from Bouncer, was presented as mascot to the WW1 Newfoundland Regiment before leaving on the S.S. Florizel. Also on board were several of Oke's great-grandsons, including William Robert's grandsons, Charles Cunningham Oke (1894–1967) and Harris R. Oke (1891–1940). Charles C. Oke was a Second Lieutenant in the Newfoundland Infantry, nicknamed "Safety Catch" for his expertise in musketry, and was credited, despite his weakened state during recuperation after Gallipoli, with rapid response in attempted rescue in London of two drowning nurses, whose canoe had overturned. Charles became the Assistant District Administrator, Federal Veteran's Administration. Harris R. Oke had a meritorious military career in France and Russia, including being awarded a Bar to a Military Cross. Harris was appointed acting governor and Commander-in-Chief of The Gambia, British West Africa and then to the position of colonial secretary, The Gambia (1934–1940). His service was honored by The Court and the Law Society of Newfoundland and Labrador and the House of Assembly of Newfoundland and Labrador. The Oke family gifted a stained glass window from the Robert McCausland Studio in Toronto to Oke's church, St. Thomas', the oldest church in St. John's (NL), in memory of Harris and his parents.

== Legacy ==
The waters surrounding Newfoundland in the early 19th century were frequented by large merchant ships employed in the seal and codfish trade in Brazil, Italy, Cuba, Mexico, the United States, and those transporting coal, lumber and vegetables from the Maritimes islands, molasses from Barbados, salt from Spain, and transporting passengers and manufactured goods from England to North America. The lives of those aboard and the livelihood of the merchant class depended on safe navigation afforded by lighthouses to avert reefs and rocky capes along the often foggy coastline. According to Molloy, Oke stands out as having the greatest impact on the development of lighthouses in Newfoundland. In addition to maintaining existing structures and upgrading lighting apparatus, he selected the site, drew up plans and supervised construction of at least 8 lighthouses, 6 of which were completed in his lifetime. His finding of a message in a bottle and publication of the note with the location of its retrieval provided information to those studying the pattern of ocean currents in the Atlantic.

Two of the sixteen lighthouses awarded designation under the Heritage Lighthouse Protection Act as historically significant in Newfoundland, Green Island and Cape St. Mary's, were built under the supervision of Oke. The Green Island lighthouse at the entrance to Catalina harbor was the first lighthouse designed and commissioned by Robert Oke in 1855, after he accepted the appointment as Chief Inspector Newfoundland Lighthouse Service. Oke's designs, with integrated keeper's dwellings, are notable for being well-proportioned and for classic detailing, including strong cornices, pilasters and wide mouldings. The Cape St. Mary's Light Tower was originally built by Oke as a brick shaft between 1859 and 1860 and today the tower is a Recognized Federal Heritage Building. Establishment of this light tower is credited with opening the southern coast of the Avalon Peninsula to residential development and trade.

The Ferryland Head Lighthouse Keeper's Dwelling, whose site selection, building design and construction were planned by Oke in 1869, was designated a municipal heritage site by the Town of Ferryland in 2006.

In 1895, the famous Isle of May light mechanism, first installed in Newfoundland in 1850 by Oke at the Cape Pine lighthouse, was moved to Harbour Grace Island, and finally to Cape Bonavista Lighthouse, where it can be viewed today, a Provincial Historic Site. Thus, both of the historic light mechanisms that ended up at Cape Bonavista, the one from Bell Rock and the one from the Isle of May passed through the hands of Oke.

The year after his death, Oke's "meritorious" service to Britain was recognized by the House Assembly of Newfoundland.
