= Fort Waldegrave, Newfoundland and Labrador =

Artillery battery in St. John's, Newfoundland

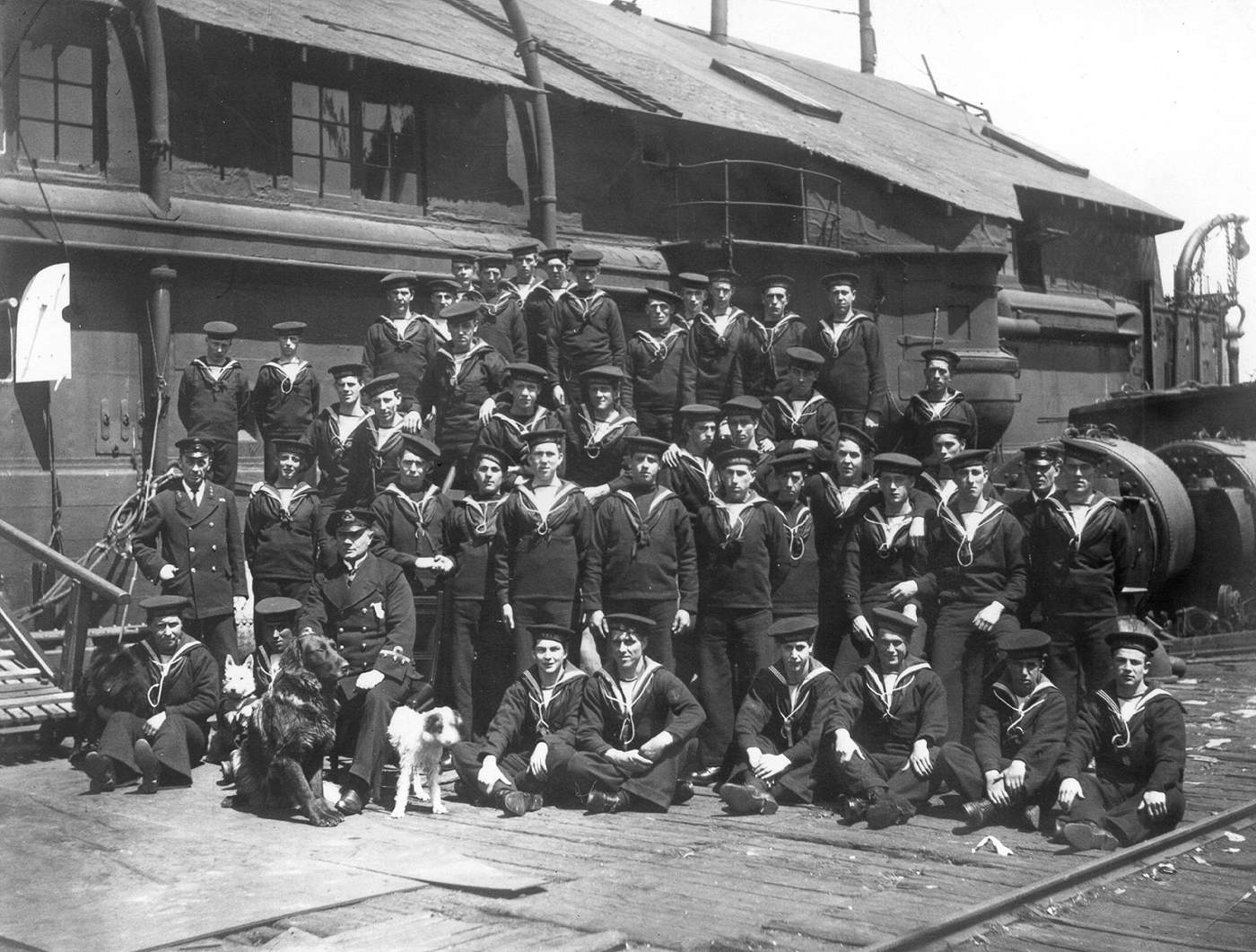
Wharfside at St. Johns. The shedlike structure behind the reservists is a drill hall erected atop Calypso's gunwale. Boat davits are shown on port side of vessel (upper left) and at stern (far right); the aft port 6" gun is sponsoned out from the hull (right of top rows of sailors). Image from Provincial Archives of Newfoundland and Labrador

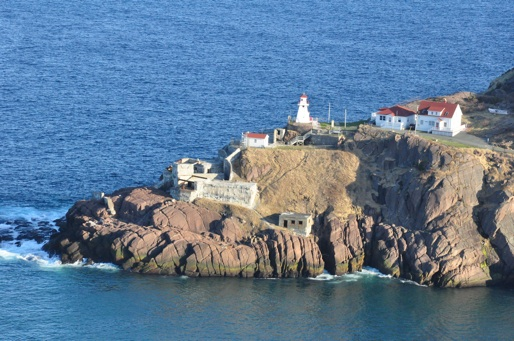
Pancake Rock at Fort Amherst, visible to left from Signal Hill.

Fort Waldegrave was a battery or an emplacement for heavy guns in St. John’s Newfoundland, strategically overlooking the Narrows and St John’s Harbour.

== Original purpose ==
It was originally constructed in 1798 where Old North Castle had first been located and was used as a support battery for Chain Rock. It was named after Governor Waldegrave. The fort is located on the slopes of Signal Hill. It is located at 47°34′07.8″N 52°41′27.3″W, on the northern side of The Narrows, the entrance to St. John's harbour.

It was also used to back up another battery, Fort Amherst, on the opposite shore from Chain Rock, an outcrop of land, which is one of two rocks located on opposite sides of the Narrows: Chain Rock is on the battery side and Pancake Rock on the opposite. They are 174 meters apart. At nightfall, a large defensive chain was stretched between the rocks by means of a capstan to prevent enemy ships from entering the harbor. Chain Rock and Pancake Rock were used for this purpose as early as 1770.

Apart from a guardhouse at Fort Waldegrave, there were two cannon, and a magazine capable of travelling.

The fortifications on the opposite side of the Narrows were named for Lieutenant Colonel William Amherst who successfully recaptured St. John's from French forces in 1762. The Seven Years' War was fought from 1756–1763 where France and Britain fought for superiority in French North America. In 1762, toward the end of the war, French forces attacked St. John's, Newfoundland. If successful, the expedition would have strengthened France's hand at the negotiating table. Though they took St. John's and raided nearby settlements, the French forces were eventually defeated by British troops at the Battle of Signal Hill. This was the final battle of the war in North America, and it forced the French to surrender to the British under Amherst. The British government now controlled all of eastern North America.

The battery was rebuilt in 1810 and was maintained until the end of 1860s.

== Use of Fort in World War I ==
During World War I, on July 8, 1916, Fort Waldegrave became important as the sole active defense site for St. John’s. A BL 6 inch gun Mk II was mounted atop a gun carriage within a protective circular stone wall. The gun was from HMS Calypso, a British Royal Navy training ship which during World War I was stationed in St John’s. In February 1916, the ship was renamed HMS Briton. Royal Navy Reservists from the ship who were each equipped with a .303 rifle, assisted the Legion of Frontiersmen who were commanded by Lieutenant Edward W. Vere Holloway and Sergeant Joseph Russell.

A small barracks and mess hall with office facilities were also located nearby along with two powder magazines. They were surrounded by a stone wall with gates. However, during World War I the Fort saw no action.

In 1920 the barrack building was sold and became a dance hall. The wall and other buildings were dismantled and used to repair the Anglican Cathedral of St. John the Baptist as well as home foundations, during the 1940s. The circular stone wall around the gun remains in place from World War I.

During World War I the chain was replaced with anti-submarine nets

== Use of Fort in World War II ==
During World War II The Chain Rock was once again used to attach a large chain and anti-submarine boom connecting to Fort Amherst above Pancake Rock, so as to prevent the entry of German U-boats into the harbour.

== Local Neighbourhood ==
The Battery is also the name that describes a small neighbourhood within the city of St. John's, Newfoundland and Labrador where Fort Waldegrave was located. In the 1920s a large stone building was built near the foot of the headland and was initially used as a hotel, the Hotel Newfoundland. In the Lower Battery area where US Army Dock Road is now located, there were at one time, railway tracks.

== Grand Concourse Authority ==
The Grand Concourse, is a network of walkways that covers the metropolitan area of the Newfoundland and Labrador Provincial Capital, St. John's, as well as its neighbouring communities of Mount Pearl and Paradise. It is 125 km long and links rivers, lakes and ponds, parks and green spaces, and historical sites such as Fort Waldegrave. This fort can be found by following the walkway indicated on the website named "Concourse Harbourside Walk East". The Authority also sets up informational boards at various points of interest on the walkways.
