= Cape Pine =

Southern most point of Newfoundland Island

Coordinates: 46°36′51″N 53°32′00″W

Location of Cape Pine in Newfoundland

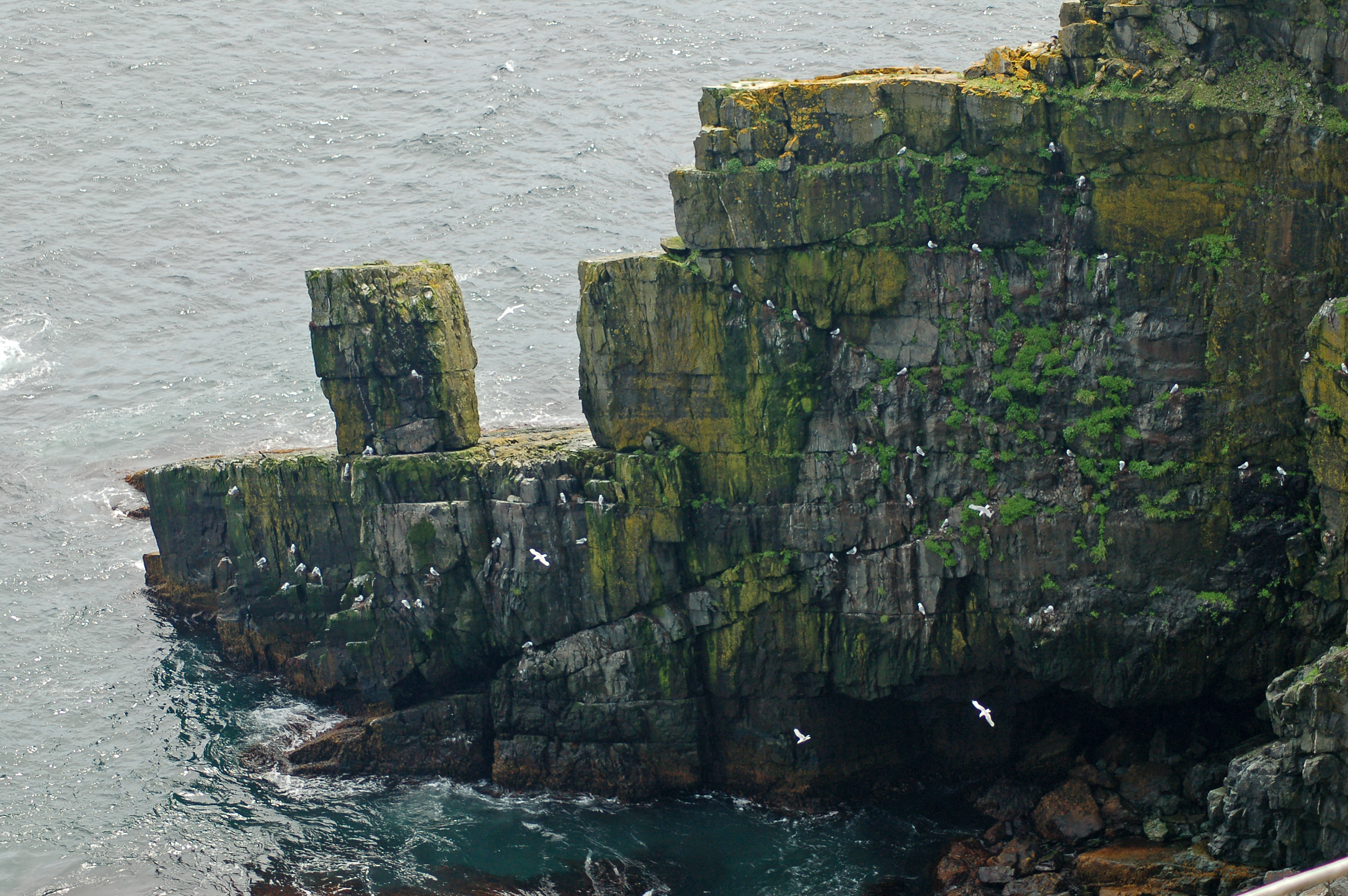
Cliffs at Cape Pine

The Headland of Cape Pine is the point of land marking the boundary of Trepassey Bay on the Avalon Peninsula of the island of Newfoundland in the Canadian province of Newfoundland and Labrador.

It is the most southerly point in Newfoundland; at 46 36' 55" N, it is roughly the same latitude as the northern border of Italy.

Cape Pine is also prone to tropical cyclones, with Tropical Storm Ophelia making landfall there in 2011.

Cape Pine is the location of the Cape Pine Light.
