= Point Riche Lighthouse =

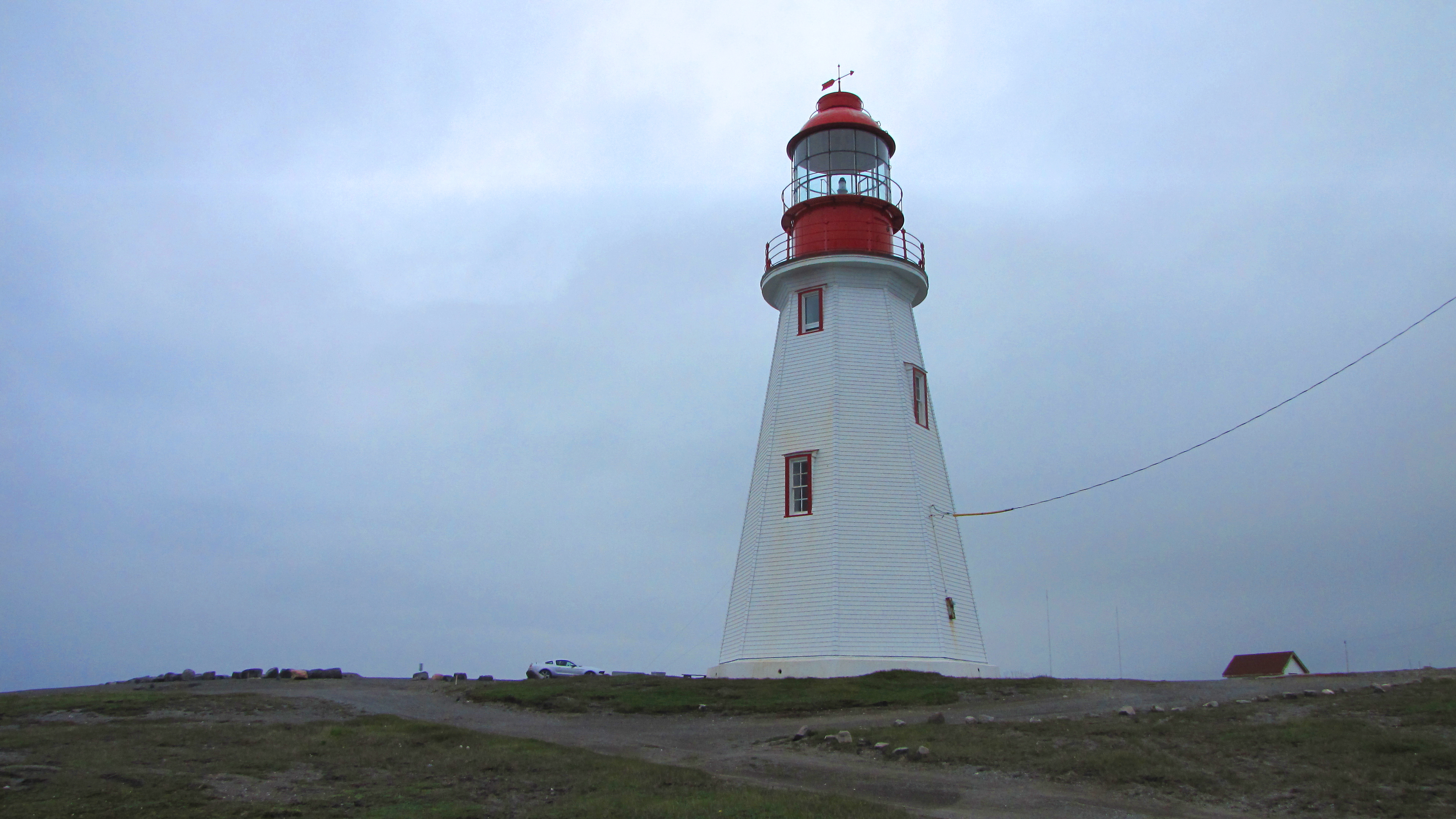
- Point Riche Lighthouse
- Location: Port au Choix; Newfoundland and Labrador; Canada
- Coordinates: 50°41′54″N 57°24′38″W

Tower
- Constructed: 1871 (first)
- Construction: wooden tower
- Height: 5 metres (16 ft)
- Shape: octagonal tower with balcony and lantern
- Markings: white tower, red balcony and lantern
- Operator: Port au Choix National Historic Site of Canada
- Heritage: recognized federal heritage building of Canada

Light
- First lit: 1892 (current)
- Focal height: 29 metres (95 ft)
- Range: 15 nautical miles (28 km; 17 mi)
- Characteristic: Fl W 5s.

Point Riche Lighthouse, located in Port au Choix, Newfoundland in Canada's Newfoundland and Labrador province, is a "pepperpot" lighthouse that was built in 1892 and is still active. The current lighthouse was built on the grounds of a previous lighthouse that was constructed in 1870 and destroyed by a fire in 1890. The current lighthouse has a white wooden tower with an octagonal pyramid shape and a red lantern room. Diesel generators were installed in 1968 followed by electricity and automation two years later. The structure is 19 metres (62 ft) tall. Its light characteristic is a flash every 5 seconds, emitted at a focal plane height of 29 metres (95 ft). It is maintained by the Port au Choix National Historic Site.

The keeper's dwelling was rebuilt in 1908 and burned down in a fire in 1998. The foundation still stands where the dwelling used to be.

The lighthouse was designated as a Federal Heritage Building in 1991.

== Keepers ==
- Eugene Roy 1871–1881
- Ferdinand Lemieux 1881–1896
- Narcisse Breton 1896–1926
- Joseph N. Romeo Breton 1926–1927
- Joseph Narcisse Gaudias Breton 1927–1959
- John Lawrence Rumbolt 1959–at least 1962

== See also ==
- List of lighthouses in Newfoundland and Labrador
- List of lighthouses in Canada
