= Harris R. Oke =

WW1 veteran and British Colonial governor

Harris Rendell Oke, CMG, MC and Bar (1 September 1891 – 18 December 1940) was a wounded veteran of World War I who became Colonial Secretary, The Gambia, British West Africa (1934–1940) and served as its Acting Governor and Commander-in-Chief for six extended periods between 1934 and 1940.

== Youth and Family ==
Harris R. Oke was the great-grandson of Robert Oke (1794–1870), the first lighthouse inspector in Newfoundland, and the grandson of William Robert Oke (1833–1894), whose business was in operation for more than a century. W. R. Oke established a carriage factory on Victoria Street in Harbour Grace in 1856 and moved to Halifax, NS. He relocated to the corner of Cochrane and Duckworth Streets in St. John's by 1879, eventually employing four of his sons as W. R. Oke & Sons. Oke's grandfather moved the carriage factory to the corner of Prescott and Duckworth Streets in 1890. Oke was born the following year (1 September 1891), and then the premises and its contents were destroyed in the Great Fire of 1892. Although uninsured, the family managed to rebuild the business at the same location and rented a portion of the property on Prescott Street to other businesses in what became known as the "Oke Building". The company expanded to produce boxcars for Robert Gillespie Reid (Halls Bay Line, Newfoundland Railroad). By 1894, they provided undertaking and funeral services, similar to other carriage builders of the day, which continued until the business was dissolved in 1968.

During Oke's life, the Oke's Carriage Factory was shepherded by his father, John Carnell Oke (1857–1931), and from 1926 by Oke's brother, Gordon Jeans Oke (1889–1977), when their father became incapacitated by chronic illness. The Okes were known for artistic carriage painting and for constructing the dog-cart presented by the children of Newfoundland, accompanied by the Newfoundland dog Bouncer, to the Duke & Duchess of Cornwall and York (later George V and Queen Mary), during their visit to the colony in 1901. An example of an Oke 19th century dog-cart (two-wheeled child’s carriage) is in the collection of The National Trust Carriage Museum (Devon). A Newfoundland dog, Sable Chief, in the same bloodline as Bouncer, was presented as mascot to the WW1 Newfoundland Regiment before leaving St. John's on the SS Florizel.

Multi-generations of Oke families resided in St. John's connected to land on the south side of Quidi Vidi Lake where Oke grew up, at the juncture of Forest Road and Quidi Vidi Road, in the vicinity known as "Oke's Corner". Oke was named for his paternal grandmother, Mary Jane Harris Carnell (1832–1926), who was heir to a portion of the 20 acre New Forest estate owned by the Gill family from the 1700s. Oke is a descendant of Nicholas Gill, Sr. (d. 1787), a naval officer and judge of the vice admiralty court who became Chief Magistrate of St. John's, and who first occupied this land. His older brother, Michael Gill, Jr. (1699–1772), raised a militia to reinforce the British garrison and was the militia's first Lieutenant-Colonel, a Justice of the Peace from 1733, and held several other prominent positions in St. John's. Their father, Captain Michael Gill, Sr. (1673–1720), was an international trader in Massachusetts who is famous for defending Bonavista, NL from a brutal French and Indian attack in 1704 during Queen Anne's War. A plaque commemorating Captain Gill is mounted on the grounds of the Bonavista Court House. In 1960, a portion of the Oke family residence was converted to house the Oke funeral business. This and other homes once owned by the Oke family straddling both sides of the north end of Quidi Vidi Road are still standing in the historic "Oke's Corner" neighborhood.

Oke was educated at Bishop Feild College and enjoyed fishing, shooting, motoring (driving an automobile), golf and tennis. He was the 4th generation of Oke family in Newfoundland to participate in Freemasonry, a tradition passed down from family in England. His maternal grandfather, John Jeans, was secretary of St. John's Lodge for 40 y. Oke's brother Gordon, was Master of Lodge Tasker No. 454 (St. John's, NL), Senior Grand Warden of the District Grand Lodge of Newfoundland (both Lodges of the Grand Lodge of Scotland), and was Director of the Masonic Mutual Life Insurance Association (St. John's, NL) for ten years.

Oke's sister Lillabelle Victoria Oke (1897–1993) worked as secretary to Walter Stanley Monroe (1871–1952) and Richard Squires (1880–1940), Prime Ministers of Newfoundland. She pursued a nursing career, following in the footsteps of Oke's sister Maude Florence Oke (1902–1988), a nurse who married and migrated to Brooklyn, NY. Lillabelle attended the St. Johns Episcopal Hospital School of Nursing (Brooklyn, NY) from 1929 to 1932, then worked at the Child's Hospital (Albany, NY), where she was Head Nurse during World War II, and the research nurse at the hospital cross-matching blood in drug experiments on adults conducted by the Bayer Aspirin Factory (Rensselaer, NY). During the summer months, she cared for children immobilised on a Bradford frame as treatment for polio or tuberculosis of the spine at Child's Hospital (Saratoga, NY). Later she worked as the school nurse for St. Agnes School (now Doane Stuart School), also in Albany. After the death of Oke's mother, Florence Jane Oke [nee Jeans] (1862–1948), Lillabelle returned to the family home to live with their sister Mary Dorothy Oke (1899–1961) and operate a small neighborhood soda fountain out of a former residence on Quidi Vidi Road (St. John's, NL).

== Military career ==
Oke was a student-at-law and articled clerk with solicitor John Fenelon (1880-1934) in St. John's, NL from October 1909 until his final year in 1914 when he put his legal career on hold to respond to Governor Walter Edward Davidson's call to join the fight for Britain's war against Germany and Austria-Hungary.

Oke, Regimental No. 565, enlisted 16 September 1914 with B Company of the 1st Battalion, Newfoundland Regiment and departed St. John's with several of his cousins aboard the SS Florizel on 4 October 1914. After training in the Salisbury Plain Training Area, he served with the Quartermaster's personal staff for Captain Michael Francis Summers when the Newfoundland Regiment was at Fort George, Scotland. After the battalion provided guard duties at Edinburgh Castle and had arrived for further training at Stobs Camp near Hawick, Oke was promoted to Acting Corp. on 22 June 1915. On 11 November 1915, while in Ayr, Scotland, Oke transferred from the Newfoundland Regiment to a Commissioned Rank (2nd Lieutenant) in the 14th Battalion of the 1st Regiment of Foot Royal Scots (Lothian Regiment) of The New Army.

Oke embarked for France on 12 June 1916 as part of the 11th Service Battalion, 27th Brigade, 9th (Scottish) Division under the command of Major-General William Furse, who geared up for a major offensive in the Battle of the Somme that July. The infantry participated in the Capture of Montauban and the liberation of Longueval. In March 1917, the 11th Battalion conducted a daylight reconnaissance along the Arras Cambrai Road followed in April by the Battle of Arras, during which Oke served as a Lieutenant (Temp.). Oke also served as Acting Captain (20 Jul 1917–10 Sep 1917). During the Third Battle of Ypres he was wounded, having been gassed on 17 August 1917 during the Battle of Langemarck and hit by shell fragments on 10 September 1917, which pierced his left shoulder and buttock. Oke was evacuated to the UK for surgery and recuperated at the W. London hospital for officers run by Lady Evelyn Mason, OBE LGStJ (1870–1944).

According to his medical report, Oke was anxious to return to the fight in France and proceeded to the 3rd (Reserve) Battalion in Edinburgh. He embarked for France on 15 December 1917, rejoining the 11th (Service) Battalion. Oke was wounded on 26 March 1918 by a gunshot to the right shoulder. He was awarded a Military Cross on 26 July 1918 for leading a successful counter-attack in France, despite being wounded, that resulted in re-occupying a lost position and inflicting heavy casualties on the enemy. He was treated at the Leith War Hospital and recuperated at the Officers Command Depot, Ripon South. On 31 October 1918, he reported to the 3rd Reserve Battalion in Mullingar, Ireland.

Oke was then ordered to serve in the North Russia Relief Force during the Archangel Campaign. He embarked on 28 April 1918, joining the 45th (Service) Battalion with the Royal Fusiliers, where he led a platoon in a counter-attack on river-craft that resulted in the surrender of two steamers and a gunboat, and saved the column a large number of casualties. For this service, he was awarded a Bar to the Military Cross. Oke relinquished his commission on completion of service with the Royal Scots Infantry on 11 December 1919, retaining the rank of lieutenant.

Altogether, Oke was injured three times in combat (Aug 1917, Sep 1917, and Mar 1918). He was mentioned by Field Marshal Douglas Haig in his 9 April 1917 dispatch, one of only 25 Newfoundland soldiers in WW1 to be mentioned in despatches by official report from a Commander-in-Chief, for which he received a certificate and an emblem of a bronze oak leaf for his Victory Medal. He also received a British War Medal for his service in WW1.

== Colonial Service ==
While recuperating in Harrogate, Yorkshire at the Furness Auxiliary Hospital (also known as Furness Officers Hospital), Oke met Lady Furness, Ada "Daisy" Hogg, the first wife of Marmaduke Furness. The Furness' had converted the former Grand Hotel into a hospital to support the Red Cross. Lady Furness recommended Oke for Colonial Service and after a furlough in St. John's, Oke reported in London on 8 March 1920 for the British Foreign Office (Diplomatic Service). On 19 May 1920, he was appointed Administrative Officer of the Northern Province of the Colony and Protectorate of Nigeria. Due to ill health, he took an extended leave in England from September 1921 to February 1922. After returning to West Africa, he was based in Ilorin, Northern Nigeria, for at least two years, working as District Commissioner. Oke served in Nigeria for 12 y (1920–1932).

Oke married Melinda Alice Duchaine (also referred to as DuChesne) on 27 February 1924, at Our Lady of Mercy Convent and Chapel (St. John's, NL). Melinda had worked in St. John's as a stenographer for John Fenelon, with whom Oke studied law before WW1. Their only child was stillborn.

In the early 1930s, the Colonial government in The Gambia was engaged with Deutsche Luft Hansa (DLH), which sought to establish an airbase in Bathurst (now Banjul) to speed mail transit between Europe and South America. DLH undertook experimental air-sea routes using the catapult ship SS Westfalen (1905) and were quick to establish routine scheduled flights. In 1932 Oke was seconded to the Administrative Service of The Gambia and began serving as the Travelling Commissioner of the South Bank of the Gambia River. An epidemic of yellow fever broke out in Bathurst in the late fall of 1934, leading to numerous casualties including the death of the Colonial Secretary, Godfrey C. B. Parish, F.R.G.S. (1897–1934). On 20 December 1934, Oke advanced to the position of Acting Colonial Secretary, The Gambia. Oke held the British line in communication with DLH to protect military security as well as to protect opportunities for future commercial growth by Imperial Airways and other British business interests, which had not yet developed air routes in West Africa. The British enacted tight control by overseeing the landing authorities granted to DLH and insisting that each flight be scheduled and any change in equipment be approved in advance.

Oke held the office of Acting Governor and Commander-in-Chief of The Gambia, British West Africa, six times, three times to fill-in for Governor Arthur Richards (Jan–Apr 1934, May–Oct 1935, Jun–Oct 1936) and three times to fill-in for Governor Thomas Southorn (Feb–Mar 1937, Apr–May 1939, and from Jun 1940).

In May 1935, Oke attended the Silver Jubilee Service (London, England) by command of His Majesty to represent The Gambia on the 25th anniversary of King George V's Accession and received a King George V Silver Jubilee Medal. He also attended the King's funeral in 1936, and with his wife, Melinda, attended the Coronation of King George VI and Queen Elizabeth in 1937, and received a King George VI Coronation Medal. Oke was appointed a Companion to the Most Distinguished Order of St Michael and St George (CMG) by King George VI during the 1939 New Year Honours held in Dec 1938.

From 1938 to 1940, as Germany advanced its agenda with little rein from international forces, West African nationals expressed mounting concern in the press over the possibility of annexation by Nazi Germany if the two major colonial powers, France and Britain, could not or would not help defend them. Germany suspended all civil flights to West Africa in August 1939 and initiated World War II, on 1 September 1939, at which time the DLH fleet came under command of the Luftwaffe. In West Africa, the reaction to war was immediate, particularly in the streets of Lagos, Nigeria where 10,000 people rallied for Britain and against Germany. Within two days, Britain and France declared war on Germany and on 6 September 1939, the Governor of The Gambia, Thomas Southorn, K.C.M.G., K.B.E.(1879–1957), instructed authorities to seize and dispose of DLH's local facilities to cut-off German access to Bathurst.

As the war escalated, geopolitical boundaries and relationships in West Africa were shifting and uncertain. France surrendered to Germany, signing the Armistice of 22 June 1940, whereas Winston Churchill and Jean Monnet had contemplated the creation of a single Franco-British citizenship, uniting the two nations. Combat missions in Africa fired up, with Britain and its African colonies providing support to Charles de Gaulle's Free France movement in the form of finances, communications, supplies, aircraft, and other resources, with the immediate goal of protecting Nigerian borders. Although the pro-Nazi, Vichy-controlled territory of French West Africa was threatening Nigeria's northern border, de Gaulle gained control of Chad and the port of Libreville, Gabon by August and Cameroon by September. Oke underscored Britain's support for de Gaulle and the value of Bathurst (The Gambia) to Free France when he hosted a delegation of Free French Officers who were waylaid there in early August. Clyde, a Short Empire S.30 series flying boat on which the officers were travelling, had been damaged on take-off from Lisbon, Portugal and was undergoing repairs in Bathurst. The delegation went on to Leopoldville, Congo and negotiated with French officers from Brazzaville in an effort to convince them to join Free France. Regional morale was further stressed in September 1940 by de Gaulle's failure to secure a French West African strategic port during the Battle of Dakar, but rallied by October when he declared Brazzaville, Congo, as the capital of Free France. Allied aircraft could then use an east-west flight corridor across Chad, connecting Nigeria to Egypt. The British colonies, and Nigeria in particular, were well-positioned to gain economically from new trade with French Equatorial Africa, which had cut off commerce with the Vichy-controlled West African territories.

Despite feeling unwell, Oke participated in a strategic war conference at the Government House in Lagos, Nigeria on 19 November 1940. However, he failed to recover and died 18 December 1940. Oke was given a military funeral with full honors in Lagos, and is buried there.

== Legacy ==
In 2016, The Law Society of Newfoundland and Labrador acknowledged Oke's service during World War I and ceremonially called him to the Bar, conferring on him the Honorary Degree of Barrister of Law. This honor was recognised by the Newfoundland and Labrador House of Assembly.

The Oke family gifted a stained glass window, "Baptism of Our Lord by John", from the studio of Robert McCausland Limited (Toronto, ON) to Oke's church, St. Thomas' (the oldest church in St. John’s, NL), in memory of Oke and his parents.
