= Frank Maher (musician) =

Canadian musician (1934–2025)

- Born: Cornelius Francis Maher; 7 March 1934; St. John's, Dominion of Newfoundland
- Died: 2 March 2025 (aged 90)
- Genres: Folk
- Occupation: Musician
- Instrument(s): Accordion, Harmonica

Cornelius Francis Maher (7 March 1934 – 2 March 2025) was a Canadian musician from Newfoundland known for his work on the buttonbox (diatonic accordion). Maher had performed solo, as well as with "almost every traditional band on the island at some point in his career", and as the leader of the band Maher's Bahers.

== Life and career ==
Maher was born on 7 March 1934, and raised in The Battery, St. John's. He began his musical career playing harmonica for US Navy ships in the harbor, and later was taught by his mother to play the single-row diatonic accordion. When the bar he was employed at burned down, he began playing music professional full-time, playing in the influential band Figgy Duff.

In 2003, Maher appeared naked in the charity calendar Pulling Out All the Stops. In 2003 Maher was awarded the 2003 St. John's Folk Arts Council Lifetime Achievement Award; in 2007 he received the Stompin' Tom Award, an award for East Coast musicians established in 1993. Maher died on 2 March 2025, aged 90.

== Solo works ==
- Mahervelous (2005)
