= Cape Pine Light =

Lighthouse on Newfoundland, Canada

Cape Pine Lighthouse
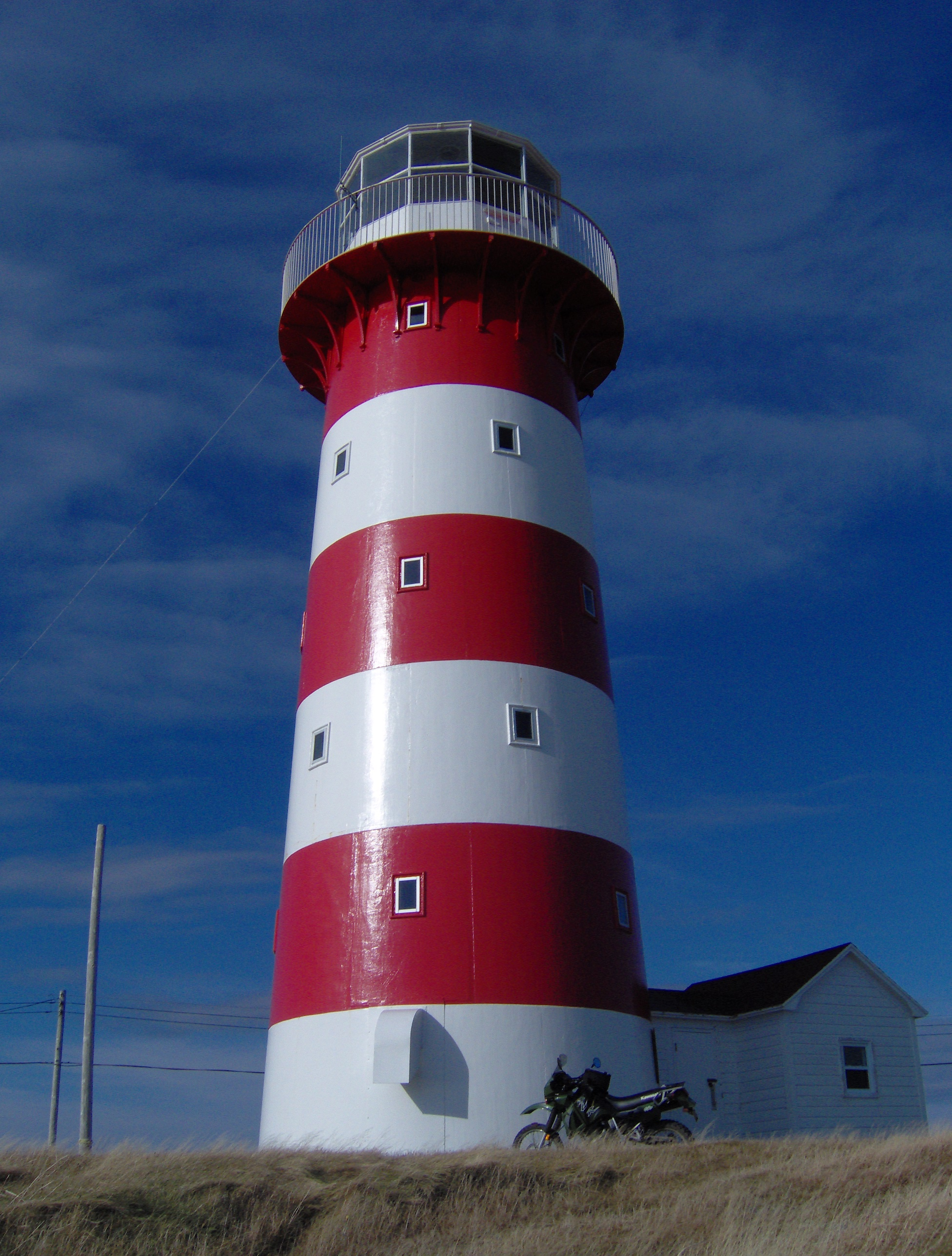
- Cape Pine Lighthouse
- Location: Cape Pine; Avalon Peninsula; Newfoundland and Labrador; Canada
- Coordinates: 46°37′01.7″N 53°31′55.6″W

Tower
- Constructed: 1851
- Construction: cast iron tower
- Height: 15 metres (49 ft)
- Shape: cylindrical tower with balcony and lantern
- Markings: tower with white and red horizontal bands, white lantern
- Operator: Canadian Coast Guard
- Heritage: recognized federal heritage building of Canada, national Historic Sites of Canada
- Fog signal: blast every 60s.

Light
- Focal height: 96 metres (315 ft)
- Range: 16 nautical miles (30 km; 18 mi)
- Characteristic: Fl W 5s.

Cape Pine Light was built on Cape Pine, Newfoundland by the British architect and engineer Alexander Gordon in 1851.

== Characteristics ==
This lighthouse is a prefabricated, cylindrical cast iron tower, painted white with red horizontal bands. The last complete painting was undertaken in 2007.

The light characteristic is a white flash every 5 seconds, additionally a fog horn may be sounded every 60 seconds. The Canadian Coast Guard maintains the site, employing a keeper.

The lighthouse was designated a National Historic Site in 1974. The keeper originally lived in the lighthouse but found it difficult to heat, and so separate housing was built in 1851. The keeper's house was razed in the 1950s and replaced by modern housing.

The lighthouse is located about 25 km (15 mi) southwest of Trepassey, and can be accessed by an 8 km (5 mi) gravel road. It is positioned at the edge of a 315-foot black slate cliff.

== Motivation for building ==
In the decades before 1850, the Admiralty in the UK had become increasingly concerned about loss of shipping and loss of life near Cape Pine, which is located at the southern tip of Avalon Peninsula, at the eastern point of St. Mary's Bay. Fishermen as well as ships bound for Europe had to cope with dense fog and strong currents. At the end of the War of 1812, the British troop ship HMS Harpooner was on its way to England and ran aground in a dense fog near Cape Pine, with over 350 fatalities. More ships bound for Europe were lost in that area during the 1820s and 1830s.

In the 1840s, the House of Assembly in Newfoundland repeatedly requested assistance from the House of Commons of the United Kingdom to build a lighthouse at Cape Pine, and in 1847 the assistance was granted. This was the first prefabricated cast iron lighthouse in Newfoundland, with many more to follow later in the nineteenth century, and in the twentieth century the preferred construction material switched to reinforced concrete.

== Keepers ==
- Henry Hearder 1851–1866
- George Hewitt 1866-1898
- George J. Hewitt 1898–1935
- George T. Hewitt 1935-1959
- Valentine Hewitt 1959–1973
- Michael Myrick 1973-1996
- Tom Finlay, Peter Myrick 1996-2011
- Rick Myrick 2011–Present

== See also ==
- List of lighthouses in Newfoundland and Labrador
- List of lighthouses in Canada
