= Ferryland Head Light =

Ferryland Head Lighthouse
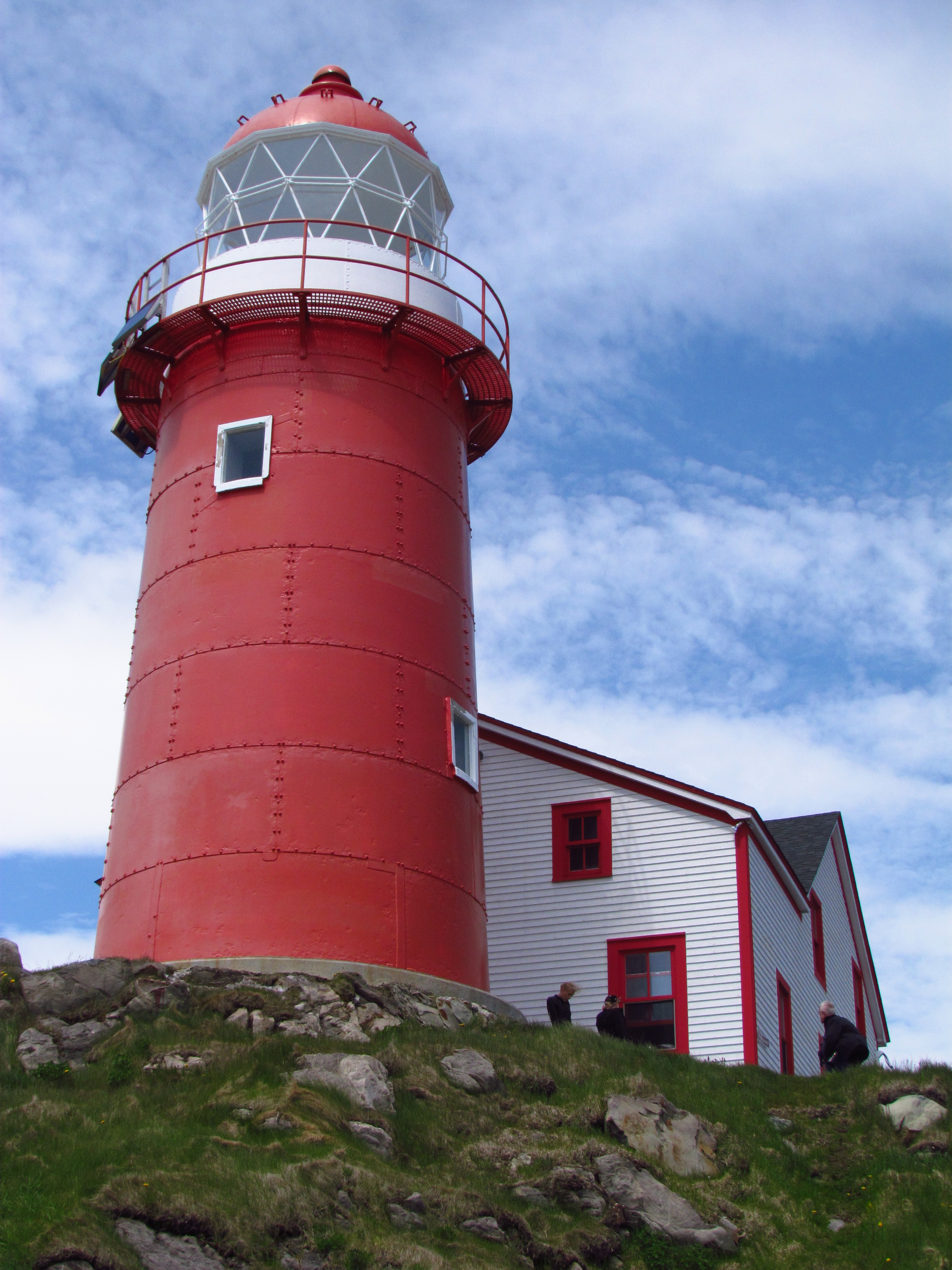
- Ferryland Head Lighthouse
- Location: Avalon Peninsula, Ferryland, Newfoundland and Labrador; Canada
- Coordinates: 47°01′00.5″N 52°51′27.4″W

Tower
- Constructed: 1871
- Construction: brick encased in iron tower
- Height: 14 metres (46 ft)
- Shape: cylindrical tower with balcony and lantern
- Markings: red tower and dome, white lantern
- Operator: Irish Loop Development Board
- Heritage: recognized federal heritage building of Canada

Light
- Focal height: 58 metres (190 ft)
- Range: 15 nmi (28 km; 17 mi)
- Characteristic: Fl W 6s.

Ferryland Head Light is an active lighthouse on Avalon Peninsula, southeast of the village of Ferryland, Newfoundland and Labrador. It is situated at the end of a long peninsula that juts into the sea.

== History ==
This lighthouse was built in 1871. It is a 14-metre tall cylindrical tower, painted red. Atop is a white lantern, a gallery, and a red roof. It was originally made of brick, but, since 1892, has been encased with iron. The lantern flashes white every six seconds. The original light has been replaced, and is now part of a display at the Ferryland Museum.

In August 2012, the Town of Ferryland became the new owners of this lighthouse. It is managed by the Irish Loop Development Board.

== Keepers ==
- Michael Kearney 1871–1882
- William Costello 1882–1905
- John William Costello 1905–1927
- Augustan Costello 1927–1939
- William "Billy" Costello 1939-1970

== See also ==
- List of lighthouses in Newfoundland and Labrador
- List of lighthouses in Canada
