= Woody Point Light =

Lighthouse in Newfoundland and Labrador

Woody Point lighthouse
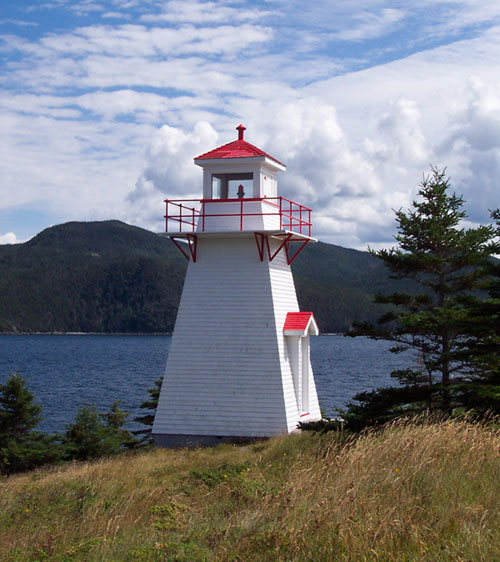
- Woody Point Lighthouse in 2006
- Location: Woody Point, Canada
- Coordinates: 49°30′17″N 57°54′45″W

Tower
- Constructed: 1919 (first); 1952 (second)
- Construction: lumber (tower)
- Height: 6 m (20 ft)
- Shape: square frustum tower with balcony and lantern
- Markings: White (tower), red (roof)
- Power source: solar power
- Operator: Canadian Coast Guard
- Heritage: heritage lighthouse, municipal heritage site

Light
- First lit: 1959 (current)
- Focal height: 14 m (46 ft)
- Range: 4 nmi (7.4 km; 4.6 mi)
- Characteristic: Fl R 4s

Woody Point Light is a light house located at Curzon Head in Woody Point, Newfoundland and Labrador.

Built in 1919, the tower was damaged in 1923 when a fire swept through the community. Originally, acetylene gas was used for the light, but after the fire, kerosene was used. In 1959, a new tower was built and it was switched to battery power.

== Keepers ==
The exact years each keeper served is unknown. It is known that three served between the period of 1949-1959.

- Richard Sheppard
- Rob Noel
- Fred Parsons
- William M. Parsons (1959-1966) As caretaker
