= Fort Amherst Lighthouse =

Lighthouse in St. John's, Canada

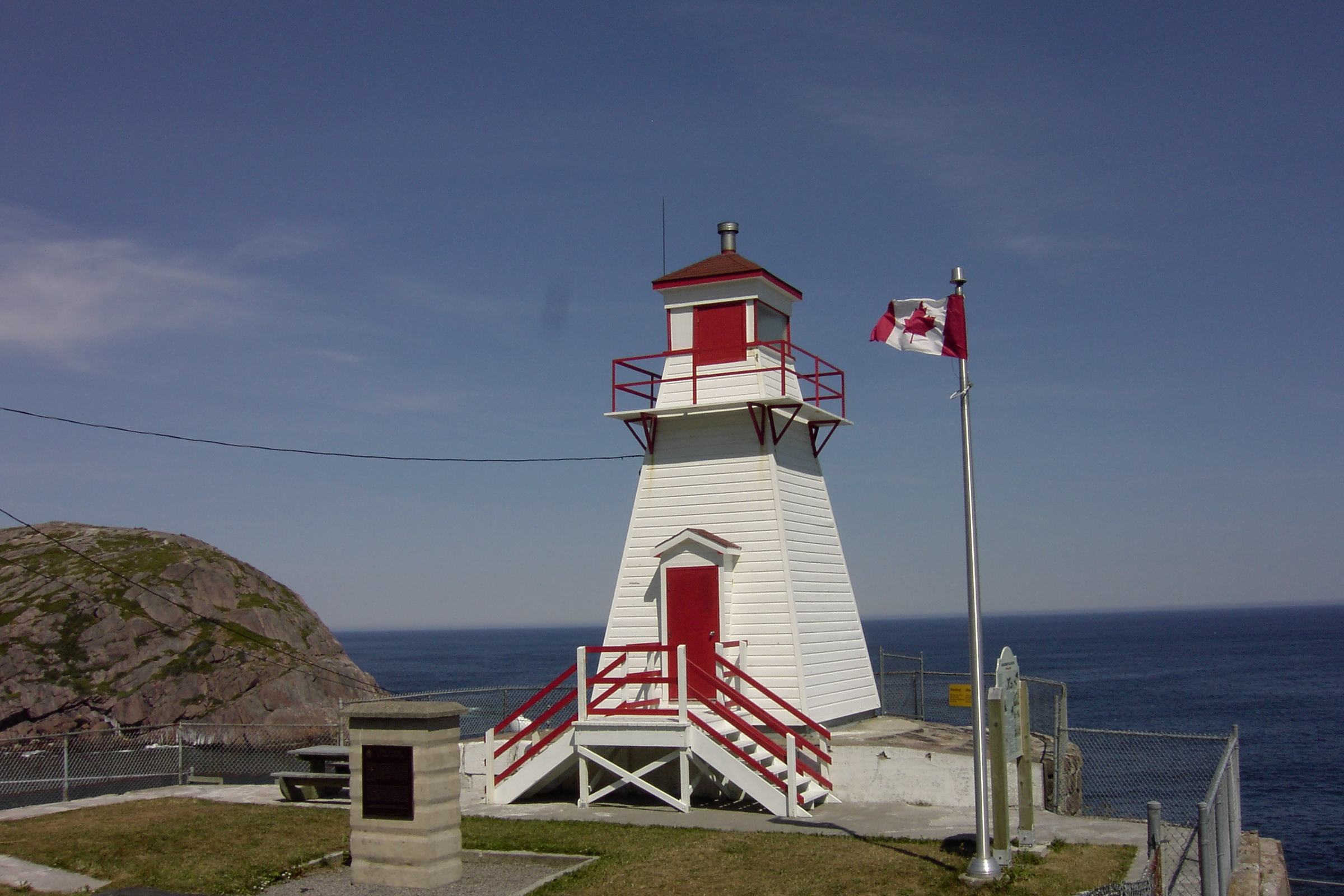
- Fort Amherst Lighthouse
- Location: Fort Amherst, St. John's, Newfoundland and Labrador
- Coordinates: 47°33′48.68″N 52°40′49.52″W

Tower
- Constructed: 1951
- Foundation: Concrete emplacement
- Construction: Wood
- Heritage: heritage lighthouse

Light
- Characteristic: Fl W 15s

Fort Amherst Lighthouse, also known as the Fort Amherst Light, is a lighthouse in Fort Amherst, St. John's, Newfoundland and Labrador. The first lighthouse at Fort Amherst was established in 1813, with the current lighthouse (built in 1951) being the third to stand at the site. The lighthouse was decommissioned in 1982 and declared a heritage site in 2014. It is currently protected and the buildings around the lighthouse are owned by the family of a former keeper.
