= The Narrows, St. John's =

Enterance to St. John's Harbour, Newfoundland and Labrador

Coordinates: 47°33′57″N 52°41′03″W

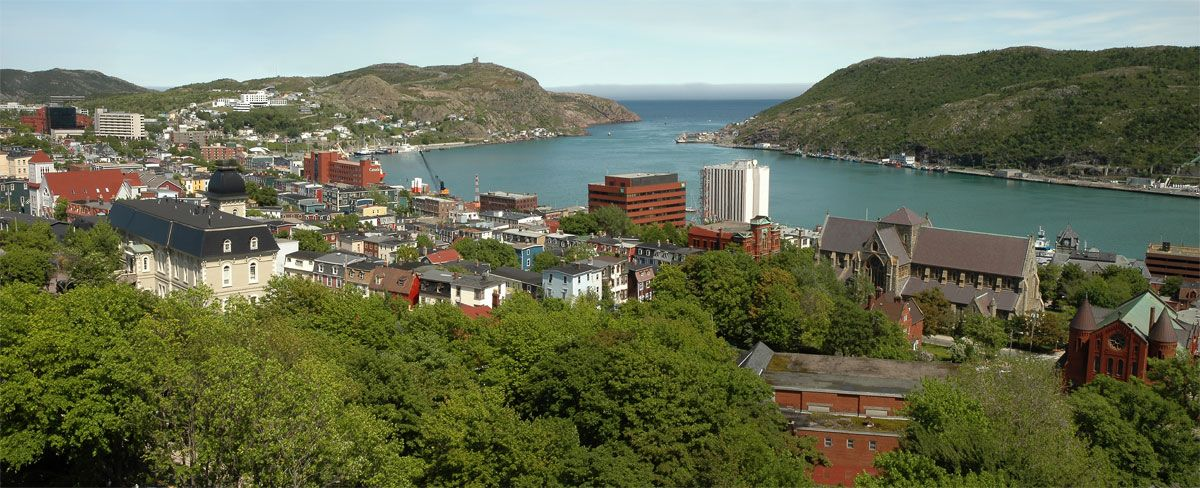
View of St. John's Narrows from The Rooms

The Narrows, is the only passage from the Atlantic Ocean to St. John's Harbour, Newfoundland, bordered north and south by steep rock walls. A skilled captain is required to navigate large ships through the Narrows, known as “threading the eye of the needle”. The channel has a least depth of 11 metres and at its narrowest point near Chain Rock is 61 metres wide. From at least circa 1830, metal rings were set into the rock on either side of the Narrows so that boats could "warp in" and be hauled along to clear the cliffs and dangerous rocks in the water. In 1855, work began to blast away the submerged top of the Merlin Rock to make a safer passage for steam ships.

The Narrows has served an important defense of the city of St. John’s from early pirates and settlers in 1655 to World War II. In 1655 vice admiral Christopher Martin erected a fort on the south side to prevent privateers and enemy vessels from entering the port. In the mid 17th century, fortifications, known as Signal Hill, were built on a north-side hill, affording a view of the Narrows and the harbor. In 1763 Fort Amherst was built in the same area. In the late 18th century a defensive chain was erected across the narrows from Chain Rock to Pancake Rock which could be raised in the event of enemy ships advancing into the harbour. During World War II a steel mesh was installed to prevent enemy submarines from entering the harbor.

The Fort Amherst Lighthouse, now a heritage site, was erected at South Head, at the entrance to the Narrows to guide approaching vessels.

The south side of the Narrows was referred to as South Battery before 1800, then the residential fishing community was known as Southside East, and finally Fort Amherst, St. John's, which includes the historic lighthouse.
