= Fort Amherst, St. John's =

Fort Amherst
- Neighbourhood
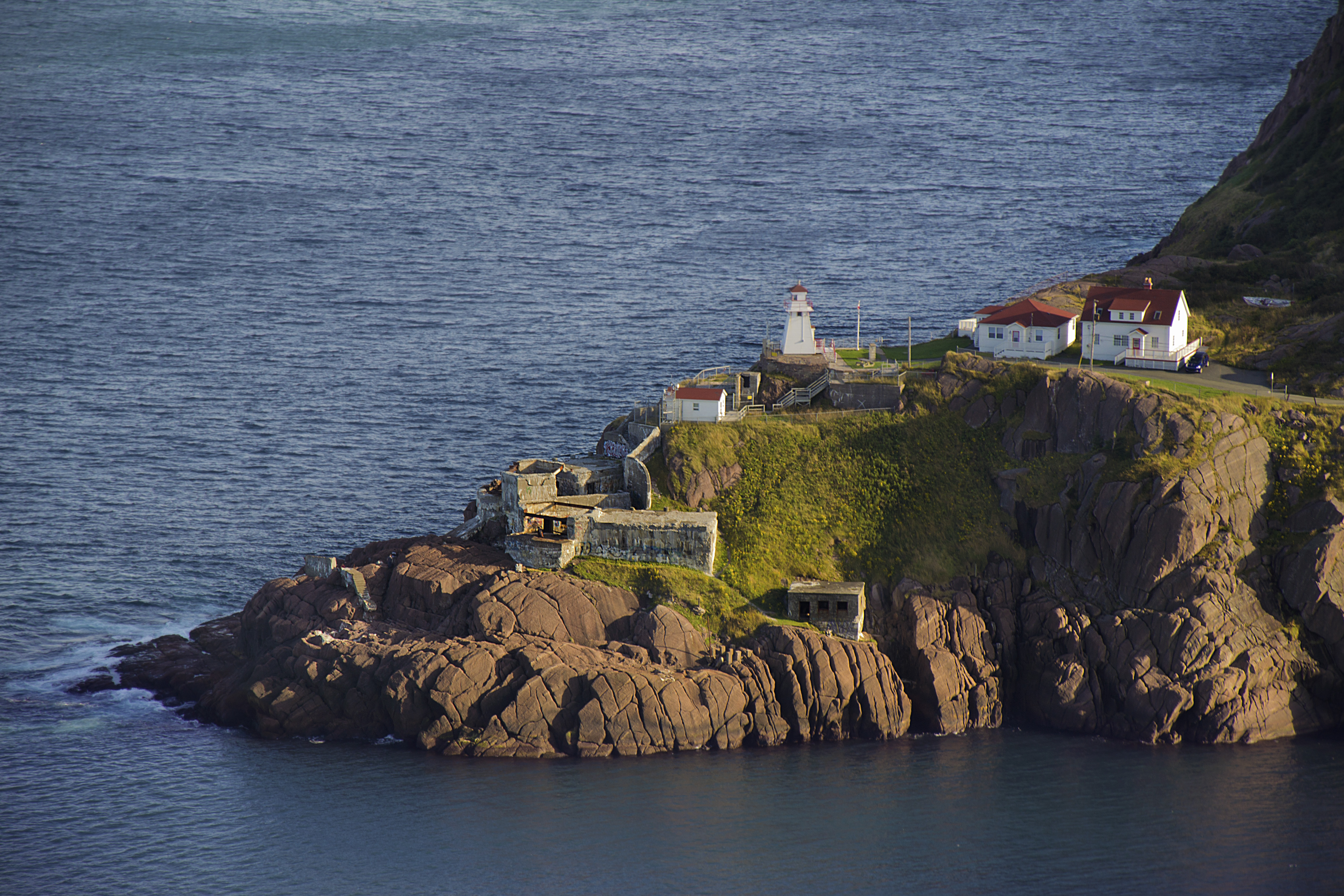
- Fort Amherst from Signal Hill
- Interactive map of Fort Amherst
- Country: Canada
- Province: Newfoundland and Labrador
- City: St. John's
- Ward: 2

Government
  - Administrative body: St. John's City Council
  - Councilor: Ophelia Ravencroft

National Historic Site of Canada
- Official name: Fort Amherst National Historic Site of Canada
- Designated: 1951
- Fort Amherst Lighthouse
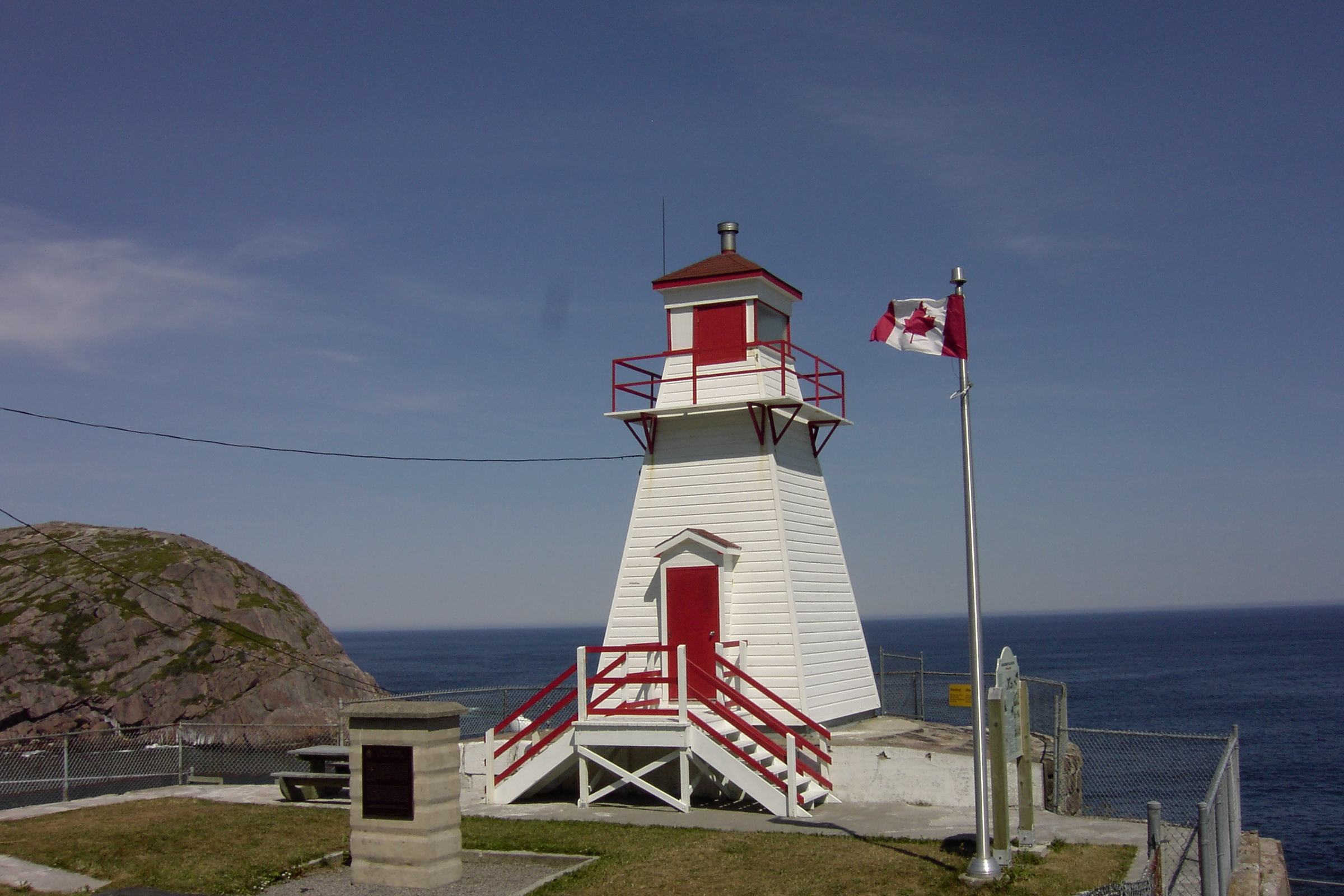
- Fort Amherst Lighthouse
- Coordinates: 47°33′48.68″N 52°40′49.52″W
- Constructed: 1813 (first); 1852 (second)
- Construction: stone tower (first) wooden tower (current)
- Height: 8 metres (26 ft)
- Shape: square frustun tower with balcony and lantern
- Markings: white tower, red lantern roof
- Operator: Fort Amherst Museum and Tea Room
- Heritage: heritage lighthouse
- First lit: 1951 (current)
- Focal height: 40 metres (130 ft)
- Range: 17 nautical miles (31 km; 20 mi)
- Characteristic: Fl W 15s.

Fort Amherst is a neighbourhood in St. John's, Newfoundland and Labrador, Canada. It is located on the southern side of the Narrows, the entrance to St. John's harbour. Apart from some family dwellings, Fort Amherst consists of a man-made harbour, a lighthouse and the remains of gun emplacements built during World War II to defend against German U-boats. Two QF 4.7-inch B Mark IV* guns remain in place on their mountings.

The original fortifications at Fort Amherst, built in the 1770s, are no longer visible. The fortifications were named for William Amherst, who successfully recaptured St. John's from French forces in 1762. The fort operated in conjunction with Fort Waldegrave for much of its history. The site was designated a National Historic Site of Canada in 1951.

The name is shared with Port La-Joye / Fort Amherst in Prince Edward Island and Fort Amherst in England.

The first lighthouse in Newfoundland was built at Fort Amherst in 1810. The current lighthouse was built in 1951.

== See also ==
- List of lighthouses in Canada
- Neighbourhoods in St. John's, Newfoundland and Labrador

== Gallery ==
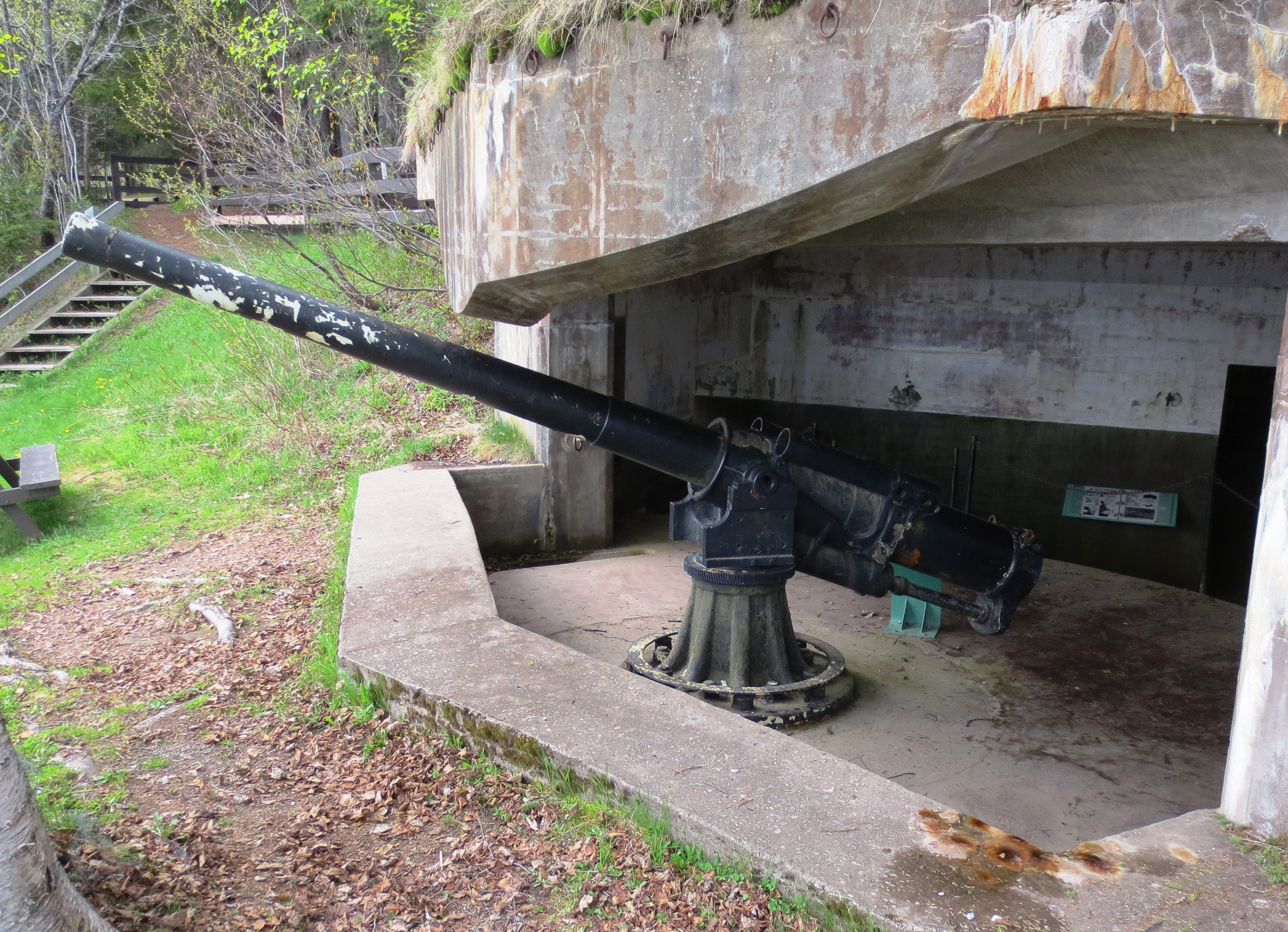
One of two surviving QF 4.7-inch B Mark IV* guns at Fort Péninsule, Forillon National Park, Quebec. It is similar to the guns at Fort Amherst.

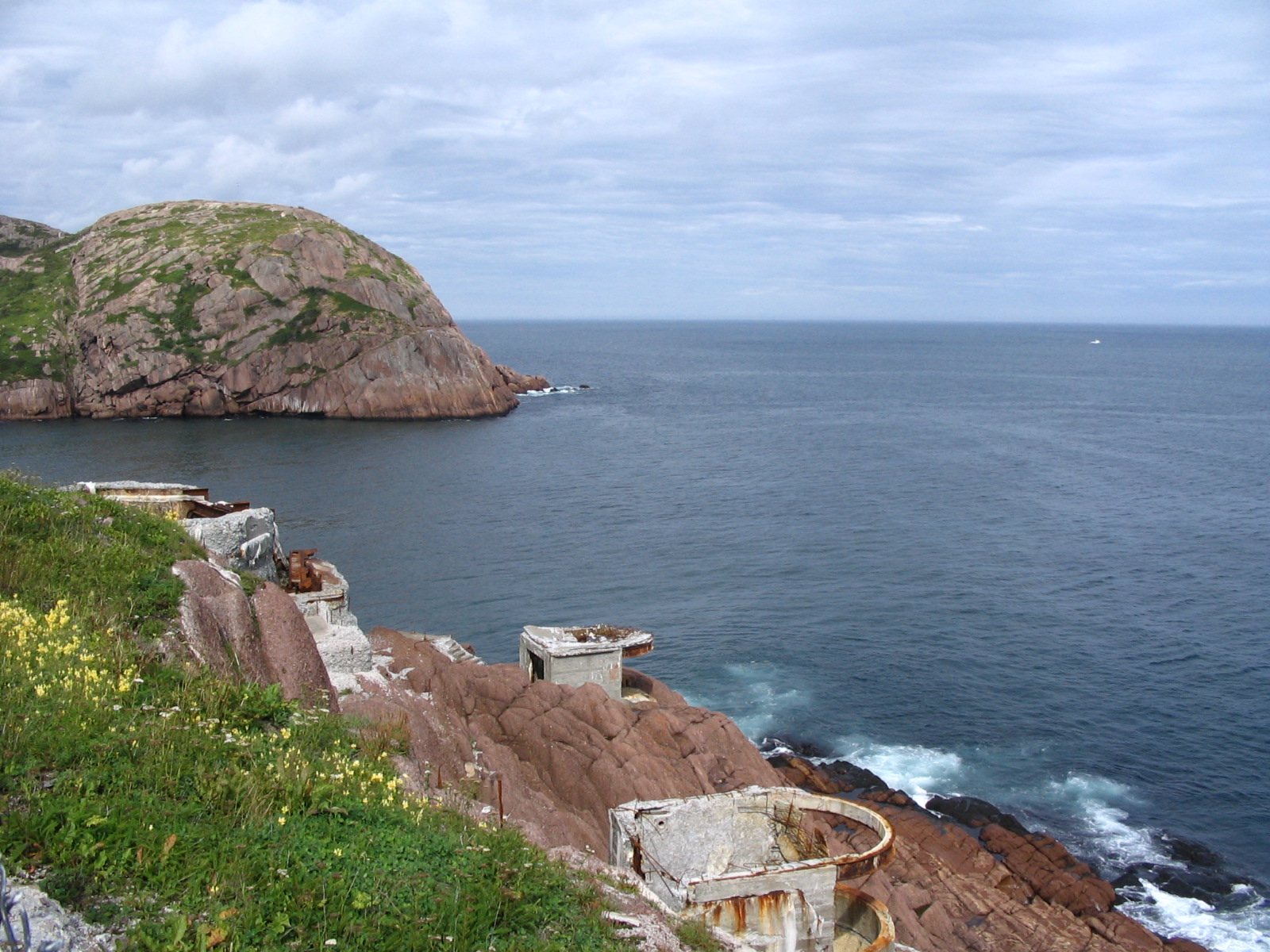
