= Dance in Newfoundland and Labrador =

Dance in Newfoundland and Labrador includes a broad tradition of Indigenous, traditional, and performance dances specific to the province of Newfoundland and Labrador, Canada. There are a number of dance artists active in the province and across Canada as well as numerous programs, organizations, and festivals.

== Notable individuals ==
- Charles Henry Danielle (1830–1902), American-born dance instructor in St. John's and Conception Bay
- Judy Knee (born 1953), Canadian dance teacher based in St. John's
- Louise Moyes (born 1965), Canadian dance choreographer based in St. John's

== Notable organizations ==
- Dance NL
- Kittiwake Dance Theatre
- Neighbourhood Dance Works

== See also ==
- Culture of Newfoundland and Labrador
- Culture of Canada
