= Kittiwake Dance Theatre =

Kittiwake Dance Theatre is the oldest non-profit dance company in the Canadian province of Newfoundland and Labrador. It was founded in March 1987 by Linda Rimsay, an American dancer who moved to St. John's, Newfoundland and Labrador in 1978. Rimsay served as Kittiwake's artistic director from 1987–2007; she was succeeded by Martin Vallée. Based in St. John's, Kittiwake boasts a repertoire of more than fifty works, and is well-known for its annual performance of The Nutcracker; it also offers workshops and residency projects. Kittiwake Dance Theatre is a not-for-profit organization, overseen by Board of Directors, elected annually.

== History ==
Kittiwake Dance Theatre evolved from Linda Rimsay's involvement with the Newfoundland Dance Theatre (NDT), a semi-professional company which Rimsay co-founded with Gail Innes in 1979. In 1981, NDT launched the "Young Dancers" program to train new dancers and help them audition for the Royal Winnipeg Ballet's professional training program and the National Ballet School. Rimsay built upon her involvement with Young Dancers to found Kittiwake in March 1987. Within two years, Kittiwake had grown into one of the province's leading dance companies and was employing an artistic director, general manager, secretary, and seamstress.

Kittiwake remained a pillar of the Newfoundland and Labrador dance community in the coming decades. In 2003, Rimsay received a YWCA Woman of Distinction Award in recognition of her contributions to Kittiwake and to the local arts community in general. In January 2007, Rimsay stepped down as Kittiwake's artistic director and moved to Toronto, where she became outreach administrator with the National Ballet School. Martin Vallée succeeded Rimsay in 2007 and remains Kittiwake's artistic director.

== Performances and collaborations ==
Kittiwake has built a company repertoire of more than fifty works and generally stages three major performances each year, as well as several smaller ones. It is perhaps best-known for its annual production of The Nutcracker, which it has performed every December of its existence.

Kittiwake also offers workshops and residency projects for local dancers, all of which are delivered by Kittiwake’s artistic staff or by visiting companies, dancers, and choreographers. Some of the organizations Kittiwake has collaborated with over the years include: Ballet Jörgen Canada, the National Ballet School, the Newfoundland Symphony Orchestra, the Atlantic Ballet Theatre of Canada, and the Shallaway Youth Choir.

== See also ==
Dance in Newfoundland and Labrador
