= Newfoundland and Labrador =

Province of Canada

Newfoundland and Labrador Terre-Neuve-et-Labrador (French)
- Province
- Flag Coat of arms
- Motto(s): Quaerite prime regnum Dei (Latin) "Seek ye first the kingdom of God" (Matthew 6:33)
- Coordinates: 53°13′48″N 59°59′57″W
- Country: Canada
- Before confederation: Dominion of Newfoundland
- Confederation: March 31, 1949 (12th)
- Capital (and largest city): St. John's
- Largest metro: Greater St. John's

Government
  - Type: Parliamentary constitutional monarchy
  - Lieutenant Governor: Joan Marie Aylward
  - Premier: Tony Wakeham
- Legislature: Newfoundland and Labrador House of Assembly
- Federal representation: Parliament of Canada
- House seats: 7 of 343 (2%)
- Senate seats: 6 of 105 (5.7%)

Area
  - Total: 405,212 km^{2} (156,453 sq mi)
  - Land: 373,872 km^{2} (144,353 sq mi)
  - Water: 31,340 km^{2} (12,100 sq mi) 7.7%
  - Rank: 10th
- 4.1% of Canada

Population (2021)
  - Total: 510,550
  - Estimate (Q3 2026): 552,462
  - Rank: 9th
  - Density: 1.37/km^{2} (3.5/sq mi)
- Demonym(s): Newfoundlander; Labradorian (see notes) (Note: Although the term Newfie is sometimes used in casual speech, some Newfoundlanders consider it a pejorative.)
- Official languages: English (de facto)

GDP
  - Rank: 8th
  - Total (2011): CA$33.624 billion
  - Per capita: CA$65,556 (5th)

HDI
  - HDI (2023): 0.929—Very high (7th)

Time zones
- Newfoundland: UTC-03:30 (NST)
  - Summer (DST): UTC-02:30 (NDT)
- Labrador (Black Tickle and North): UTC-04:00 (AST)
  - Summer (DST): UTC-03:00 (ADT)
- Canadian postal abbr.: NL (formerly NF)
- Postal code prefix: A
- ISO 3166 code: CA-NL
- Flower: Pitcher plant
- Tree: Black spruce
- Bird: Atlantic puffin
- Website: gov.nl.ca
- Rankings include all provinces and territories

Newfoundland and Labrador (Note: /ˈnjuːfən(d)lænd ... ˈlæbrədɔːr/ NEW-fən(d)-land, ... LAB-rə-dor, locally /ˌnuːfənˈlænd ... / NEW-fən-LAND ...; French: Terre-Neuve-et-Labrador [tɛʁ nœv e labʁadɔʁ], lit. 'New Land and Labrador'; frequently abbreviated as NL) is the easternmost province of Canada, in the country's Atlantic region. It comprises the island of Newfoundland and the continental region of Labrador, with an area of 405,212 km^{2} (156,453 sq mi) and a population of 552,462 in 2026. Newfoundland with its neighbouring islands has 94% of the province's population, with more than half in the Avalon Peninsula. Labrador has a land border with the province of Quebec and a short border with Nunavut on Killiniq Island. The French overseas collectivity of Saint Pierre and Miquelon lies about 20 km (12 mi) west of the Burin Peninsula.

In 2021, 99.4% of residents reported English as their native language, making Newfoundland and Labrador Canada's most linguistically homogeneous province. Much of the population is descended from English and Irish settlers, with the majority immigrating from the early 17th century to the late 19th century. St. John's, the capital and largest city, is Canada's 22nd-largest census metropolitan area and home to about 40% of the province's population. St. John's is the seat of the provincial House of Assembly and its highest court, the Court of Appeal.

Until 1949, the Dominion of Newfoundland was a separate dominion in the British Empire. In 1933, the House of Assembly of the self-governing dominion voted to dissolve itself and to hand over administration of Newfoundland and Labrador to the British-appointed Commission of Government. This followed the suffering caused by the Great Depression and Newfoundland's participation in the First World War. On March 31, 1949, it became the tenth and most recent province to join the Canadian Confederation as "Newfoundland". On December 6, 2001, the Constitution of Canada was amended to change the province's name from "Newfoundland" to "Newfoundland and Labrador".

== Names ==
In 1499 King Henry VII in a letter referred to the newly encountered landmass explored in 1497 by Sebastian and John Cabot as "new founde land." In Portuguese, it is Terra Nova (while the province's full name in that language is Terra Nova e Labrador), which literally means "new land" and is also the French name for the province's island region (Terre-Neuve). The name "Terra Nova" is in wide use on the island (e.g. Terra Nova National Park). The influence of early Portuguese exploration is also reflected in the name of Labrador, which derives from the surname of the Portuguese navigator João Fernandes Lavrador.

Labrador's name in the Inuttitut/Inuktitut language (spoken in Nunatsiavut) is Nunatsuak (ᓄᓇᑦᓱᐊᒃ), meaning "the big land" (a common English nickname for Labrador). Newfoundland's Inuttitut/Inuktitut name is Ikkarumikluak (ᐃᒃᑲᕈᒥᒃᓗᐊᒃ), meaning "place of many shoals". Newfoundland and Labrador's Inuttitut / Inuktitut name is Ikkarumikluak aamma Nunatsuak.

Terre-Neuve-et-Labrador is the French name used in the Constitution of Canada. However, French is not widely spoken in Newfoundland and Labrador and is not an official language at the provincial level.

On April 29, 1999, the government of Brian Tobin introduced a constitutional amendment in the Newfoundland House of Assembly, to amend the Newfoundland Act and change the province's name to "Newfoundland and Labrador". In October 2001, Tobin, now back in federal politics, introduced a corresponding resolution in the House of Commons, to implement the name change. Premier Roger Grimes stated: "The Government of Newfoundland and Labrador is firmly committed to ensuring official recognition of Labrador as an equal partner in this province, and a constitutional name change of our province will reiterate that commitment." Following approval by the House of Commons and the Senate, Governor-General Adrienne Clarkson proclaimed the constitutional amendment, making the name change official on December 6, 2001.

== Geology ==
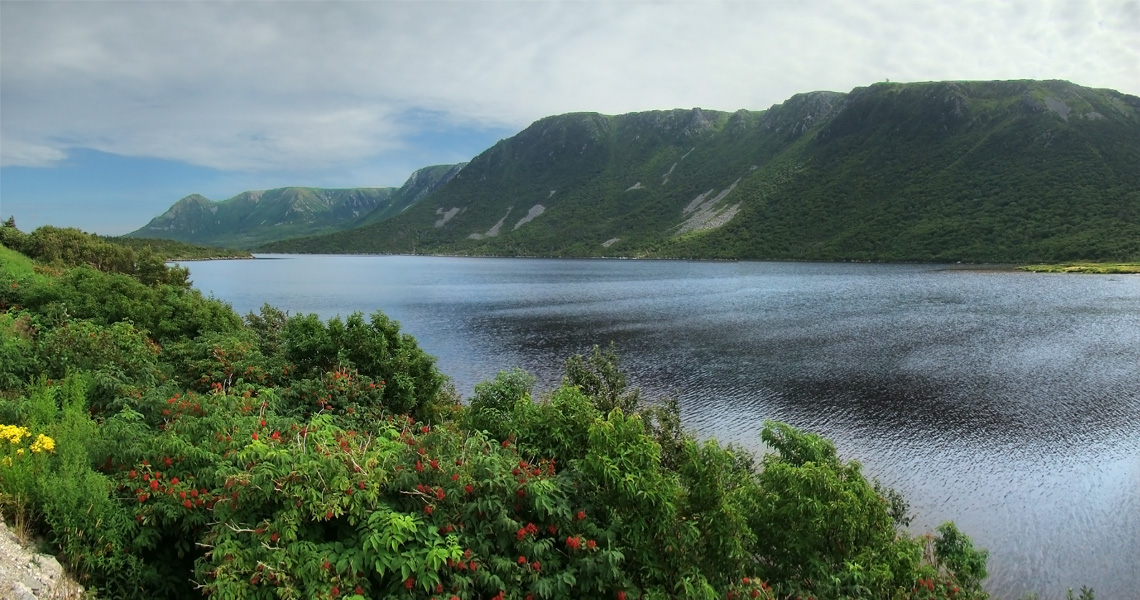
The Long Range Mountains on Newfoundland's west coast are the northernmost extension of the Appalachian Mountains.

Labrador is the easternmost part of the Canadian Shield, a vast area of ancient metamorphic rock making up much of northeastern North America. Colliding tectonic plates have shaped much of the geology of Newfoundland. Gros Morne National Park has a reputation as an outstanding example of tectonics at work, and as such has been designated a World Heritage Site. The Long Range Mountains on Newfoundland's west coast are the northeasternmost extension of the Appalachian Mountains.

The north-south extent of the province (46°36′N to 60°22′N), prevalent westerly winds, cold ocean currents and local factors such as mountains and coastline combine to create the various climates of the province.

== Geography ==
Newfoundland and Labrador is the most easterly province in Canada, situated in the northeastern region of North America. The Strait of Belle Isle separates the province into two geographical parts: Labrador, connected to mainland Canada, and Newfoundland, an island in the Atlantic Ocean. The province also includes over 7,000 tiny islands. The highest point of the province is Mount Caubvick with the highest point on Newfoundland being Cabox.

Newfoundland has a roughly triangular shape. Each side is about 400 km (250 mi) long, and its area is 108,860 km^{2} (42,030 sq mi). Newfoundland and its neighbouring small islands (excluding French possessions) have an area of 111,390 km^{2} (43,010 sq mi). Newfoundland extends between latitudes 46°36′N and 51°38′N.

Labrador is also roughly triangular in shape: the western part of its border with Quebec is the drainage divide of the Labrador Peninsula. Lands drained by rivers that flow into the Atlantic Ocean are part of Labrador, and the rest belongs to Quebec. Most of Labrador's southern boundary with Quebec follows the 52nd parallel of latitude. Labrador's extreme northern tip, at 60°22′N, shares a short border with Nunavut on Killiniq Island. Labrador also has a maritime border with Greenland. Labrador's land area (including associated small islands) is 294,330 km^{2} (113,640 sq mi). Together, Newfoundland and Labrador make up 4.06% of Canada's area, with a total area of 405,720 km^{2} (156,650 sq mi).

=== Climate ===
Newfoundland, in broad terms, has a cool summer subtype, with a humid continental climate attributable to its proximity to water — no part of the island is more than 100 km (62 mi) from the Atlantic Ocean. However, Northern Labrador is classified as a polar tundra climate, and southern Labrador has a subarctic climate. Newfoundland and Labrador contain a range of climates and weather patterns, including frequent combinations of high winds, snow, rain, and fog, conditions that regularly made travel by road, air, or ferry challenging or impossible.

Köppen climate types of Newfoundland and Labrador

Monthly average temperatures, rainfall levels, and snowfall levels for four locations are shown in the attached graphs. St. John's represents the east coast, Gander the interior of the island, Corner Brook the west coast of the island and Wabush the interior of Labrador. Climate data for 56 places in the province is available from Environment Canada.

The data for the graphs is the average over 30 years. Error bars on the temperature graph indicate the range of daytime highs and night time lows. Snowfall is the total amount that fell during the month, not the amount accumulated on the ground. This distinction is particularly important for St. John's, where a heavy snowfall can be followed by rain, so no snow remains on the ground.

Surface water temperatures on the Atlantic side reach a summer average of 12 °C (54 °F) inshore and 9 °C (48 °F) offshore to winter lows of −1 °C (30 °F) inshore and 2 °C (36 °F) offshore. Sea temperatures on the west coast are warmer than Atlantic side by 1–3 °C (approximately 2–5 °F). The sea keeps winter temperatures slightly higher and summer temperatures a little lower on the coast than inland. The maritime climate produces more variable weather, ample precipitation in a variety of forms, greater humidity, lower visibility, more clouds, less sunshine, and higher winds than a continental climate.

Average daily maximum and minimum temperatures for selected locations in Newfoundland and Labrador
| Location | July (°C) | July (°F) | January (°C) | January (°F) |
|---|---|---|---|---|
| St. John's | 20/11 | 68/52 | −1/−9 | 30/16 |
| Grand Falls-Windsor | 23/11 | 73/52 | −2/–12 | 27/9 |
| Gander | 21/11 | 71/51 | −3/−12 | 26/11 |
| Corner Brook | 22/13 | 71/55 | −3/−10 | 28/15 |
| Stephenville | 20/12 | 68/54 | −2/−9 | 27/15 |
| Fogo Island | 19/10 | 66/50 | −3/–9 | 26/16 |
| Labrador City | 19/8 | 66/47 | −16/–27 | 2/–18 |
| Happy Valley-Goose Bay | 21/10 | 69/50 | −12/−22 | 9/−8 |
| Nain | 15/5 | 59/41 | −14/−23 | 7/−10 |

== History ==
=== Early history and the Beothuks ===
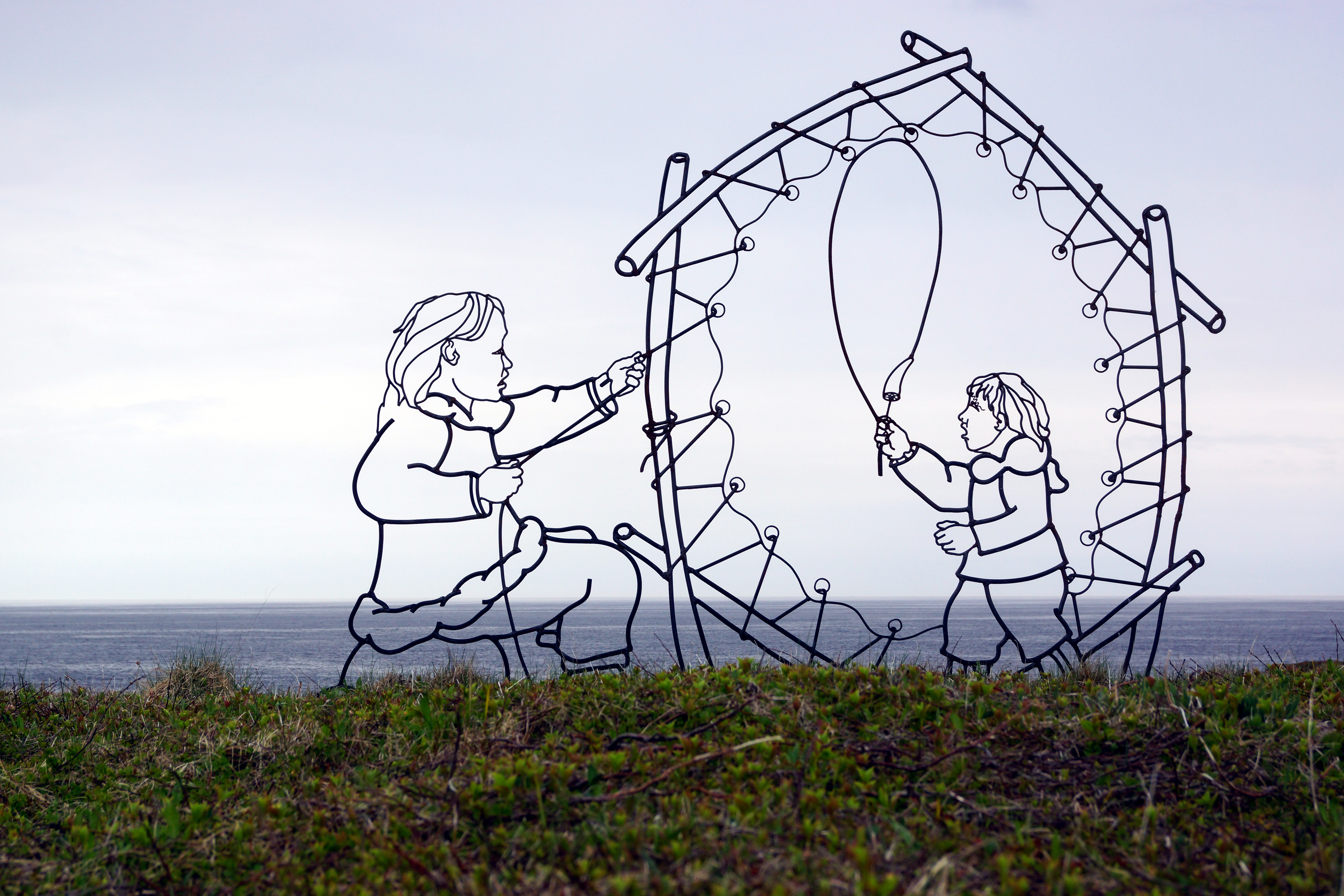
An artistic depiction of the Maritime Archaic culture, at the Port au Choix Archaeological Site. The Maritime Archaic peoples were the first to settle Newfoundland.

==== Dorset culture ====
Human habitation in Newfoundland and Labrador can be traced back about 9,000 years. The Maritime Archaic peoples were sea-mammal hunters in the subarctic. They prospered along the Atlantic Coast of North America from about 7000 BC to 1500 BC. Their settlements included longhouses and boat-topped temporary or seasonal houses. They engaged in long-distance trade, using as currency white chert, a rock quarried from northern Labrador to Maine. The southern branch of these people was established on the north peninsula of Newfoundland by 5,000 years ago. The Maritime Archaic period is best known from a mortuary site in Newfoundland at Port au Choix.

The Maritime Archaic peoples were gradually displaced by people of the Dorset culture (Late Paleo-Eskimo) who also occupied Port au Choix. The number of their sites discovered on Newfoundland indicates they may have been the most numerous Aboriginal people to live there. They thrived from about 2000 BC to 800 AD. Many of their sites were on exposed headlands and outer islands. They were more oriented to the sea than earlier peoples, and had developed sleds and boats similar to kayaks. They burned seal blubber in soapstone lamps.

Many of these sites, such as Port au Choix, recently excavated by Memorial archaeologist, Priscilla Renouf, are quite large and show evidence of a long-term commitment to place. Renouf has excavated huge amounts of harp seal bones at Port au Choix, indicating that this place was a prime location for the hunting of these animals.

The people of the Dorset culture (800 BC – 1500 AD) were highly adapted to a cold climate, and much of their food came from hunting sea mammals through holes in the ice. The massive decline in sea ice during the Medieval Warm Period would have had a devastating effect upon their way of life.

==== Beothuk settlement ====
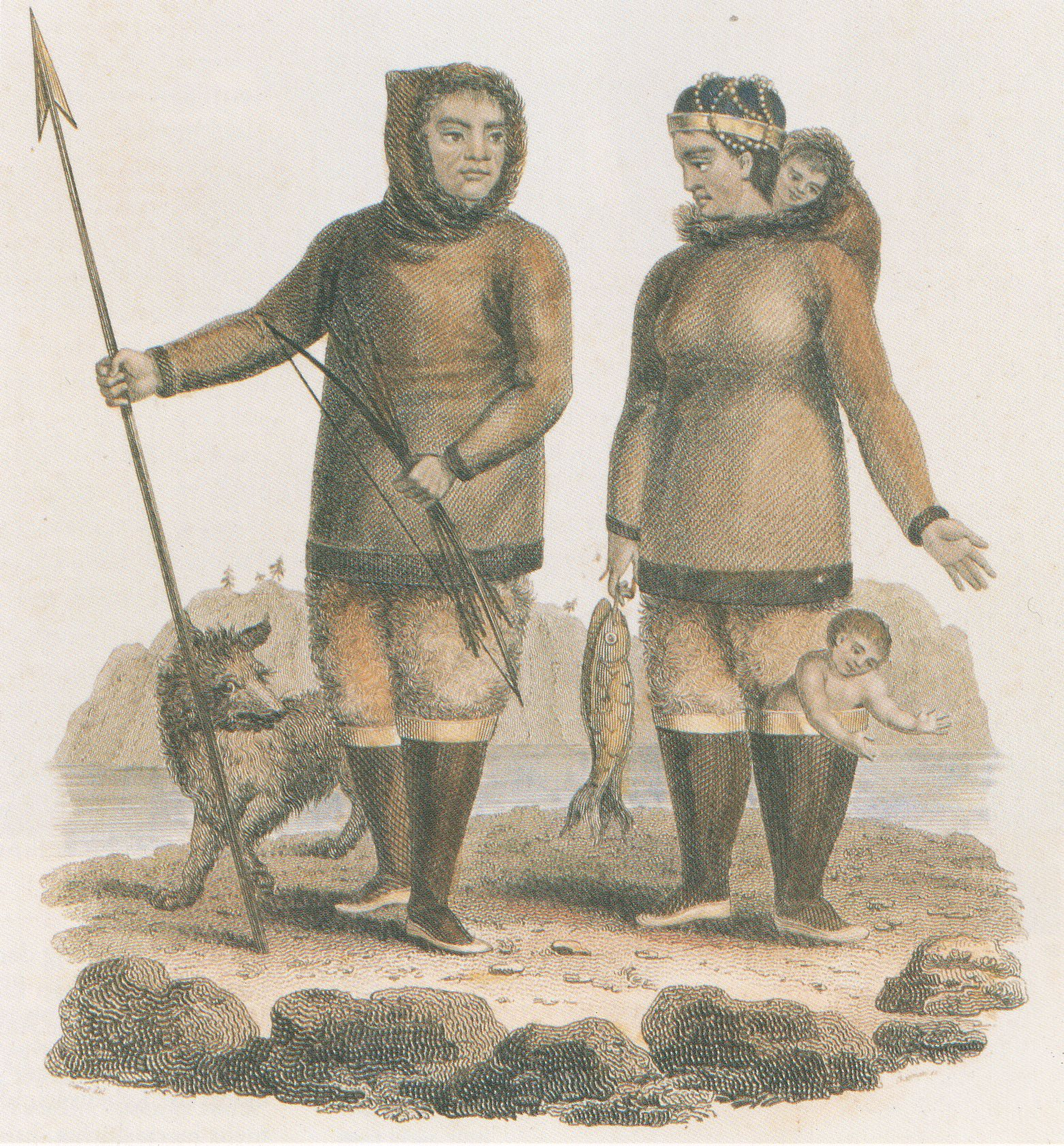
Depiction of the Inuit of Labrador, c. 1812

The appearance of the Beothuk culture is believed to be the most recent cultural manifestation of peoples who first migrated from Labrador to Newfoundland around 1 AD. The Inuit, found mostly in Labrador, are the descendants of what anthropologists call the Thule people, who emerged from western Alaska around 1000 AD and spread eastwards across the High Arctic tundra reaching Labrador around 1300–1500. Researchers believe the Dorset culture lacked the dogs, larger weapons and other technologies that gave the expanding Inuit an advantage.

The inhabitants eventually organized themselves into small bands of a few families, grouped into larger tribes and chieftainships. The Innu are the inhabitants of an area they refer to as Nitassinan, i.e. most of what is now referred to as northeastern Quebec and Labrador. Their subsistence activities were historically centered on hunting and trapping caribou, deer and small game. Coastal clans also practiced agriculture, fished and managed maple sugar bush. The Innu engaged in tribal warfare along the coast of Labrador with Inuit groups that had large populations.

The Miꞌkmaq of southern Newfoundland spent most of their time on the shores harvesting seafood; during the winter they would move inland to the woods to hunt. Over time, the Miꞌkmaq and Innu divided their lands into traditional "districts". Each district was independently governed and had a district chief and a council. The council members were band chiefs, elders and other worthy community leaders. In addition to the district councils, the Miꞌkmaq tribes also developed a Grand Council or Santé Mawiómi, which according to oral tradition was formed before 1600.

==== European contact ====
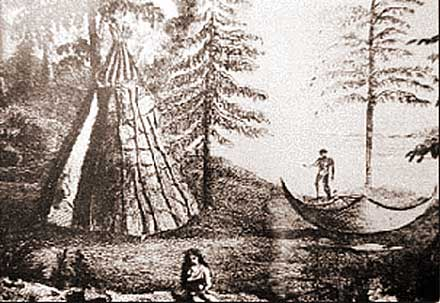
A Beothuk encampment in Newfoundland, c. 18th century

The oldest confirmed accounts of European contact date from a thousand years ago as described in the Viking (Norse) Icelandic Sagas. Around the year 1001, the sagas refer to Leif Erikson landing in three places to the west, the first two being Helluland (possibly Baffin Island) and Markland (possibly Labrador). Leif's third landing was at a place he called Vinland (possibly Newfoundland). Archaeological evidence of a Norse settlement was found in L'Anse aux Meadows, Newfoundland, in the 1960s. It was declared a World Heritage Site by UNESCO in 1978.

There are several other unconfirmed accounts of European discovery and exploration, one tale of men from the Channel Islands being blown off course in the late 15th century into a strange land full of fish, and another from Portuguese maps that depict the Terra do Bacalhau, or land of codfish, west of the Azores. It has also been claimed that Saint Brendan visited the Island in the early 6th century.

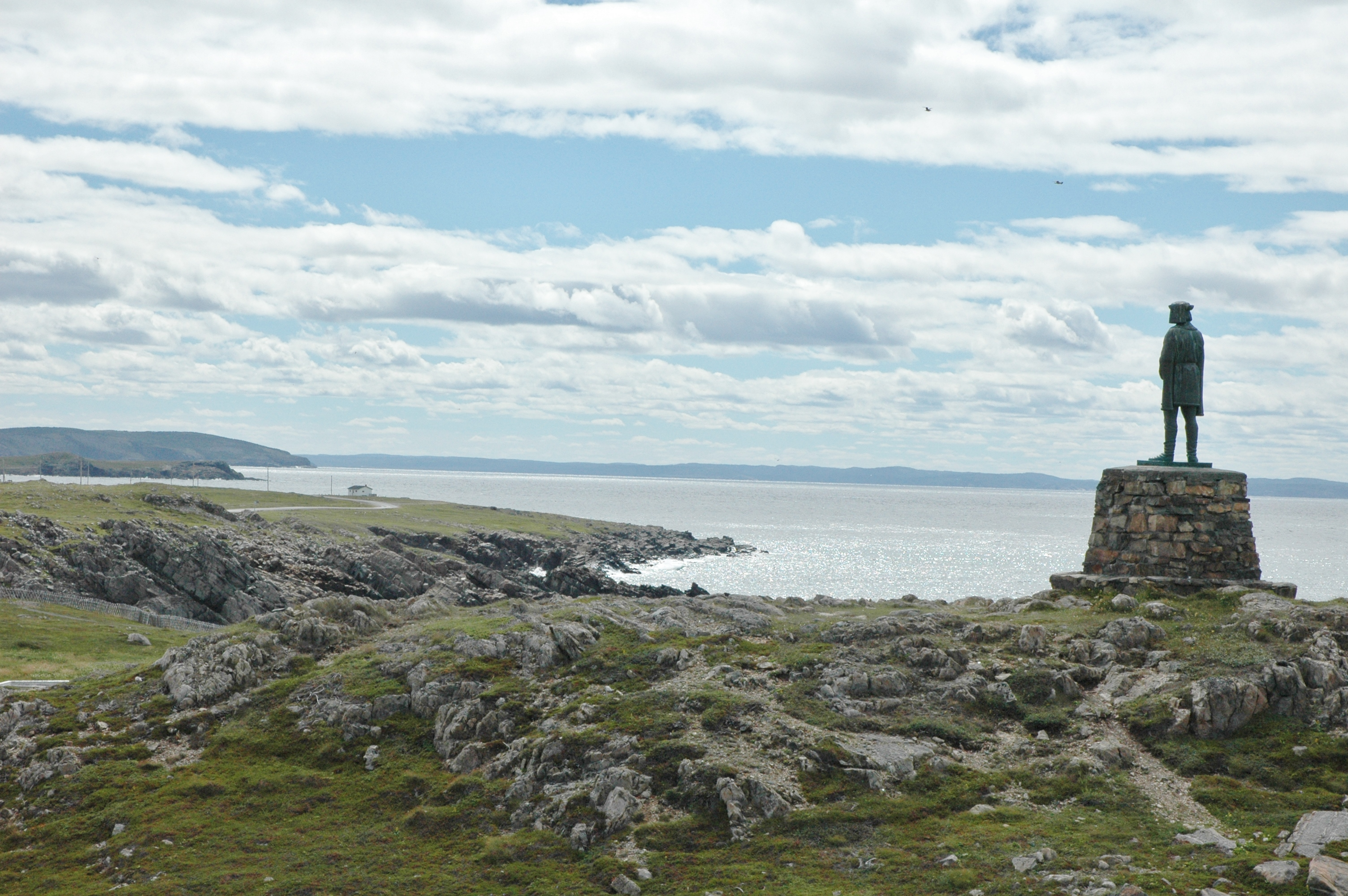
A statue of John Cabot at Cape Bonavista. The cape is officially cited as the area where Cabot landed in 1497 by the governments of Canada and the United Kingdom.

In 1496, John Cabot obtained a charter from English King Henry VII to "sail to all parts, countries and seas of the East, the West and of the North, under our banner and ensign and to set up our banner on any new-found-land" and on June 24, 1497, landed in Cape Bonavista. Historians disagree on whether Cabot landed in Nova Scotia in 1497 or in Newfoundland, or possibly Maine, if he landed at all, but the governments of Canada and the United Kingdom recognise Bonavista as being Cabot's "official" landing place. In 1499 and 1500, Portuguese mariners João Fernandes Lavrador and Pero de Barcelos explored and mapped the coast, the former's name appearing as "Labrador" on topographical maps of the period.

Based on the Treaty of Tordesillas, the Portuguese Crown claimed it had territorial rights in the area John Cabot visited in 1497 and 1498. Subsequently, in 1501 and 1502, the Corte-Real brothers, Miguel and Gaspar, explored Newfoundland and Labrador, claiming them as part of the Portuguese Empire. In 1506, king Manuel I of Portugal created taxes for the cod fisheries in Newfoundland waters. João Álvares Fagundes and Pero de Barcelos established seasonal fishing outposts in Newfoundland and Nova Scotia around 1521, and older Portuguese settlements may have existed.

By the time regular European contact with Newfoundland began in the early 16th century, the Beothuk were the only Indigenous group living permanently on the island. Unlike other groups in the Northeastern area of the Americas, the Beothuk never established sustained trading relations with European settlers. Their interactions were sporadic, and they largely attempted to avoid contact. The establishment of English fishing operations on the outer coastline of the island, and their later expansion into bays and inlets, cut off access for the Beothuk to their traditional sources of food.

In the 18th century, as the Beothuk were driven further inland by these encroachments, violence between Beothuk and settlers escalated, with each retaliating against the other in their competition for resources. By the early 19th century, violence, starvation, and exposure to tuberculosis had decimated the Beothuk population, and they were extinct by 1829.

=== European settlement and conflict ===
Sometime before 1563, Basque fishermen, who had been fishing cod shoals off Newfoundland's coasts since the beginning of the sixteenth century, founded Plaisance (today Placentia), a seasonal haven which French fishermen later used. In the Newfoundland will of the Basque seaman Domingo de Luca, dated 1563 and now in an archive in Spain, he asks "that my body be buried in this port of Plazençia in the place where those who die here are usually buried". This will is the oldest-known civil document written in Canada.

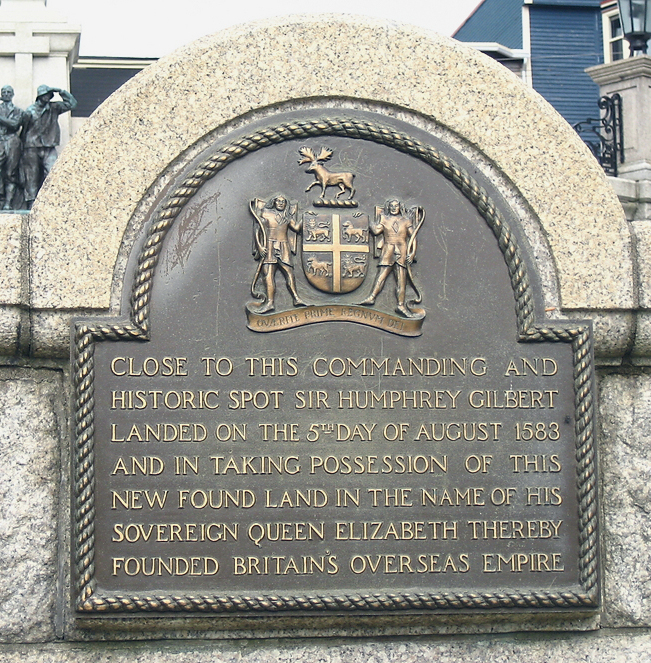
Plaque in St. John's commemorating the English claim over Newfoundland, and the beginning of the British overseas empire

Twenty years later, in 1583, Newfoundland became England's first possession in North America and one of the earliest permanent English colonies in the New World when Sir Humphrey Gilbert, provided with letters patent from Queen Elizabeth I, landed in St. John's. European fishing boats had visited Newfoundland continuously since Cabot's second voyage in 1498 and seasonal fishing camps had existed for a century prior. Fishing boats originated from Basque country, England, France, and Portugal.

In 1585, during the initial stages of Anglo-Spanish War, Bernard Drake led a devastating raid on the Spanish and Portuguese fisheries. This provided an opportunity to secure the island and led to the appointment of Proprietary Governors to establish colonial settlements on the island from 1610 to 1728. John Guy became governor of the first settlement at Cuper's Cove. Other settlements included Bristol's Hope, Renews, New Cambriol, South Falkland and Avalon (which became a province in 1623). The first governor given jurisdiction over all of Newfoundland was Sir David Kirke in 1638.

Explorers quickly realized the waters around Newfoundland had the best fishing in the North Atlantic. By 1620, 300 fishing boats worked the Grand Banks, employing some 10,000 sailors; many continuing to come from the Basque Country, Normandy, or Brittany. They dried and salted cod on the coast and sold it to Spain and Portugal. Heavy investment by Sir George Calvert, 1st Baron Baltimore, in the 1620s in wharves, warehouses, and fishing stations failed to pay off. French raids hurt the business, and the weather was terrible, so he redirected his attention to his other colony in Maryland. After Calvert left, small-scale entrepreneurs such as Sir David Kirke made good use of the facilities. Kirke became the first governor of Newfoundland in 1638.

==== Triangular Trade ====
A triangular trade with New England, the West Indies, and Europe gave Newfoundland an important economic role. By the 1670s, there were 1,700 permanent residents and another 4,500 in the summer months.

This trade relied upon the labour of enslaved people of African descent. Salted cod from Newfoundland was used to feed the slaves on plantations in the West Indies. Products typically associated with Newfoundland such as molasses and rum (Screech), were produced on these plantations, and shipped to Newfoundland and England on merchant ships. Some merchants in Newfoundland enslaved persons of African descent such as St. John's merchant, Thomas Oxford. John Ryan, merchant and publisher of the Royal Gazette and Newfoundland Advertiser, who resided in New Brunswick and Newfoundland, freed his enslaved servant Dinah, upon his death in Newfoundland in 1847, notably after the Slavery Abolition Act in 1833.

Notably, the Kirke brothers who were merchants in the triangular trade, brought Olivier Le Jeune to New France, where he was sold in 1629.

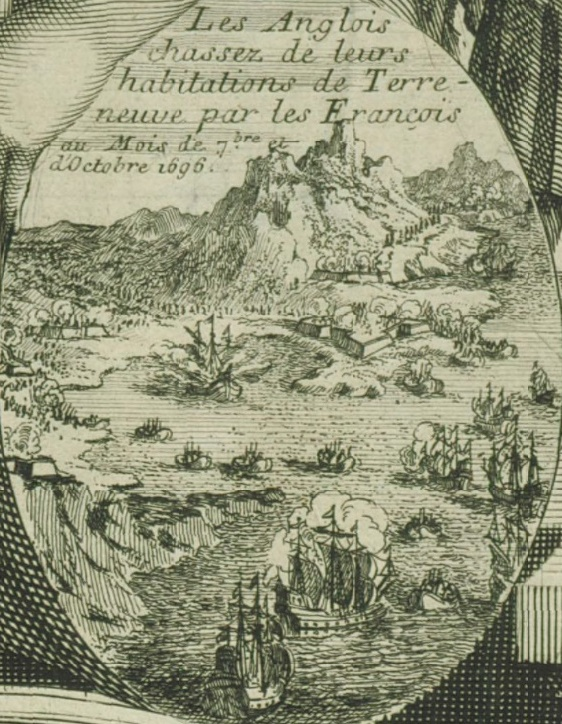
French forces sacking English settlements in Newfoundland in 1696

In 1655, France appointed a governor in Plaisance (Placentia), the former Basque fishing settlement, thus starting a formal French colonization period in Newfoundland as well as a period of periodic war and unrest between England and France in the region. The Miꞌkmaq, as allies of the French, were amenable to limited French settlement in their midst and fought alongside them against the English. English attacks on Placentia provoked retaliation by New France explorer Pierre Le Moyne d'Iberville who during King William's War in the 1690s, destroyed nearly every English settlement on the island. The entire population of the English colony was either killed, captured for ransom, or sentenced to expulsion to England, with the exception of those who withstood the attack at Carbonear Island and those in the then remote Bonavista.

After France lost political control of the area after the Siege of Port Royal in 1710, the Miꞌkmaq engaged in warfare with the British throughout Dummer's War (1722–1725), King George's War (1744–1748), Father Le Loutre's War (1749–1755) and the French and Indian War (1754–1763). The French colonization period lasted until the Treaty of Utrecht of 1713, which ended the War of the Spanish Succession: France ceded to the British its claims to Newfoundland (including its claims to the shores of Hudson Bay) and to the French possessions in Acadia. Afterward, under the supervision of the last French governor, the French population of Plaisance moved to Île Royale (now Cape Breton Island), part of Acadia which remained then under French control.

In the Treaty of Utrecht (1713), France had acknowledged British ownership of the island. However, in the Seven Years' War (1756–1763), control of Newfoundland once again became a major source of conflict between Britain, France and Spain, who all pressed for a share in the valuable fishery there. Britain's victories around the globe led William Pitt to insist nobody other than Britain should have access to Newfoundland. The Battle of Signal Hill was fought on September 15, 1762, and was the last battle of the North American theatre of the Seven Years' War. A British force under Lieutenant Colonel William Amherst recaptured St. John's, which the French had seized three months earlier in a surprise attack.

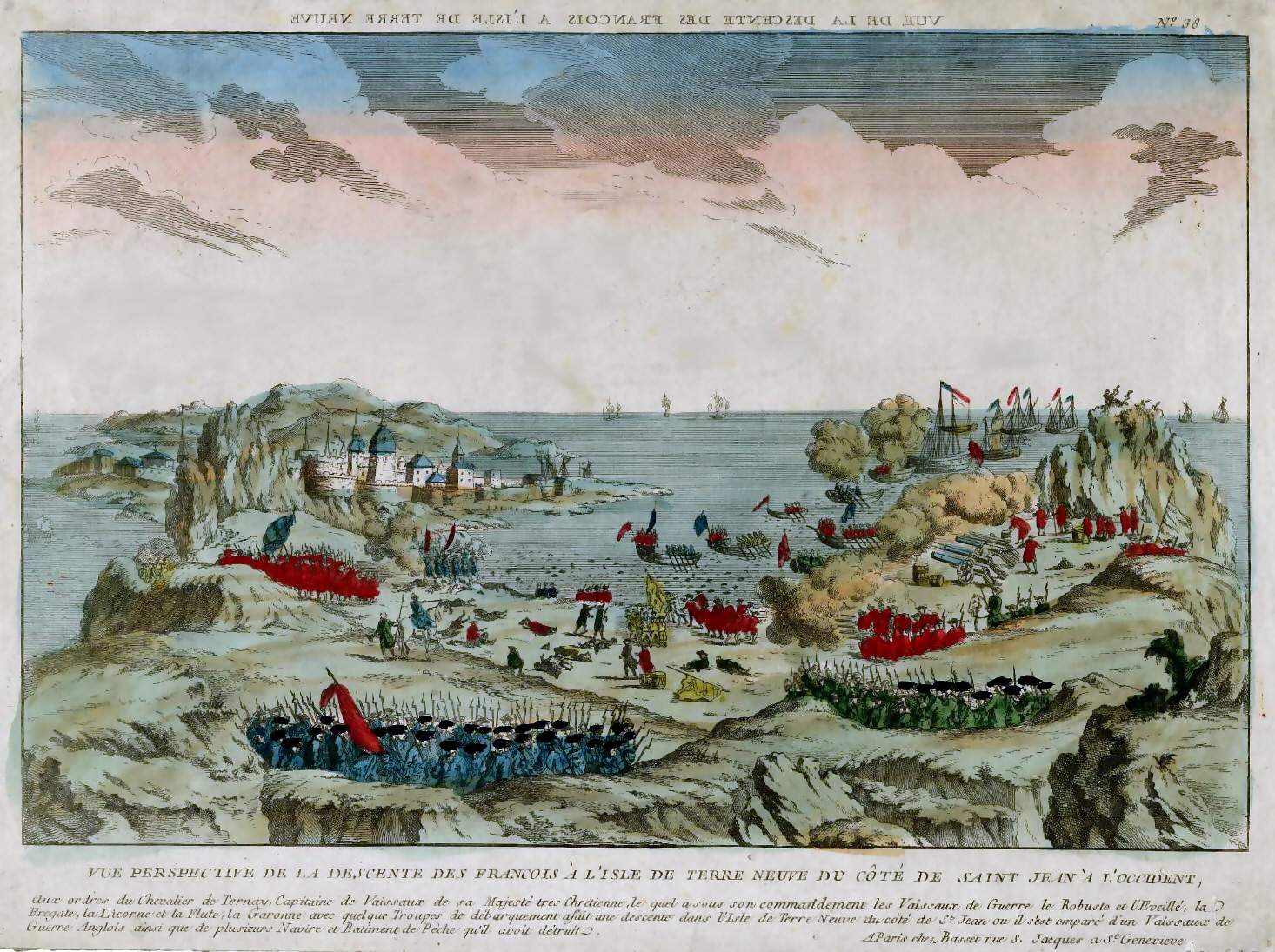
A French invasion of the Newfoundland was repulsed during the Battle of Signal Hill in 1762.

From 1763 to 1767, James Cook made a detailed survey of the coasts of Newfoundland and southern Labrador while commander of HMS Grenville. (The following year, 1768, Cook began his first circumnavigation of the world.) In 1796, a Franco-Spanish expedition again succeeded in raiding the coasts of Newfoundland and Labrador, destroying many of the settlements.

By the Treaty of Utrecht (1713), French fishermen gained the right to land and cure fish on the "French Shore" on the western coast. (They had a permanent base on the nearby St. Pierre and Miquelon islands; the French gave up their French Shore rights in 1904.) In 1783, the British signed the Treaty of Paris with the United States that gave American fishermen similar rights along the coast. These rights were reaffirmed by treaties in 1818, 1854 and 1871, and confirmed by arbitration in 1910.

=== British colony ===
==== Fishing Admirals and Naval Governors ====
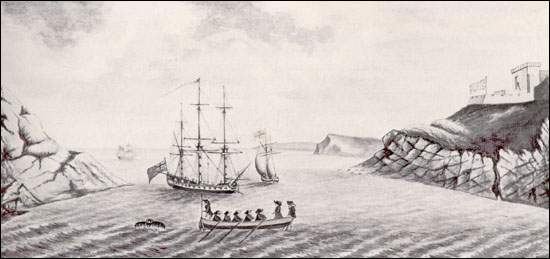
Drawing of the St. John's port, next to Fort William on 1786

The British merchant adventurers who gained control of Newfoundland aimed to keep it as fishing station and nothing more. Women were barred from the island, and no man could remain there over winter or build a permanent house. The masters of the first three vessels entering St. Johns were recognised as the "Fishing Admirals" for the season, and they administered justice and settled disputes as they saw fit. Despite repressive measures, settlers grew in number, and in 1729 London was induced to appoint as Commodore-Governor the Royal Navy officer who commanded the annual fishing convoy which left England each spring. The naval governors brought no immediate change in policy. As late as 1789, Governor Milbanke wrote that "it is not in the interest of Great Britain to encourage people to winter in Newfoundland". The Avalon Peninsula nonetheless had a sufficient permanent population by 1818 to for a naval governor to assume year-round residence.

==== The United Irish Conspiracy and Catholic Emancipation ====
George Calvert, 1st Baron Baltimore, who between 1629 and 1632 sought to establish himself on the peninsula as the founding proprietor of the Province of Avalon, had intended that it should serve as a refuge for his persecuted Roman Catholic co-religionists. But like his other colony in the Province of Maryland on the American mainland, it soon passed out of the Calvert family's control. The majority Catholic population that later developed, thanks to Irish immigration, in St. John's and the Avalon Peninsula, was subjected to the same disabilities that applied elsewhere under the British Crown. Governor John Campbell did issue an edict of toleration in 1784, permitting Roman Catholics to worship publicly. But on visiting St. John's in 1786, Prince William Henry (the future King William IV) noted that "there are ten Roman Catholics to one Protestant", and counselled against any further measure of Catholic relief.

Following news of rebellion in Ireland, in June 1798, Governor Vice-Admiral Waldegrave cautioned London that the English constituted but a "small proportion" of the locally raised Regiment of Foot. In an echo of an earlier Irish conspiracy during the French occupation of St. John's in 1762, in April 1800, the authorities had reports that upwards of 400 men had taken an oath as United Irishmen, and that eighty soldiers were committed to killing their officers and seizing their Anglican governors at Sunday service.

The abortive mutiny, for which eight men (denounced by Catholic Bishop James Louis O'Donel as "favourers of the infidel French") were hanged, may have been less a United Irish plot, than an act of desperation in the face of brutal living conditions and officer tyranny. Many of the Irish reserve soldiers were forced to remain on duty, unable to return to the fisheries that supported their families. Yet the Newfoundland Irish would have been aware of the agitation in the homeland for civil equality and political rights. There were reports of communication with United men in Ireland from before '98 rebellion; of Thomas Paine's pamphlets circulating in St. John's; and, despite the war with France, of hundreds of young County Waterford men still making a seasonal migration to the island for the fisheries, among them defeated rebels, said to have "added fuel to the fire" of local grievance.

When news reached Newfoundland in May 1829 that the UK Parliament had finally conceded Catholic emancipation, the locals assumed that Catholics would now pass unhindered into the ranks of public office and enjoy equality with Protestants. There was a celebratory parade and mass in St. John's, and a gun salute from vessels in the harbour. But the attorney general and supreme court justices determined that as Newfoundland was a colony, and not a province of the United Kingdom, the Roman Catholic Relief Act did not apply. The discrimination was a matter of local ordinance.

It was not until May 1832 that the British Secretary of State for the Colonies formally stated that a new commission would be issued to Governor Cochrane to remove any and all Roman Catholic disabilities in Newfoundland. By then Catholic emancipation was bound up (as in Ireland) with the call for home rule.

==== Achievement of home rule ====
After the end of the Napoleonic Wars in 1815, France and other nations re-entered the fish trade and an abundance of cod glutted international markets. Prices dropped, competition increased, and the colony's profits evaporated. A string of harsh winters between 1815 and 1817 made living conditions even more difficult, while fires at St. John's in 1817 left thousands homeless. At the same time a new wave of immigration from Ireland increased the Catholic population. In these circumstances much of the English and Protestant proprietor class tended to shelter behind the appointed, and Anglican, "naval government".

A broad home-rule coalition of Irish community leaders and (Scottish and Welsh) Methodists formed in 1828. Expressing, initially, the concerns of a new middle class over taxation, it was led by William Carson, a Scottish physician, and Patrick Morris, an Irish merchant. In 1825, the British government granted Newfoundland and Labrador official colonial status and appointed Sir Thomas Cochrane as its first civil governor. Partly carried by the wave of reform in Britain, a colonial legislature in St. John's, together with the promise of Catholic emancipation, followed in 1832. Carson made his goal for Newfoundland clear: "We shall rise into a national existence, having a national character, a nation's feelings, assuming that rank among our neighbours which the political situation and the extent of our island demand".

Standing as Liberals, the reformers sought to break the Anglican monopoly on government patronage and to tax the fisheries to fund the judiciary, road-building projects, and other expenses. They were opposed by the Conservatives (the "Tories"), who largely represented the Anglican establishment and mercantile interests. While Tories dominated the governor's appointed Executive Council, Liberals generally held the majority of seats in the elected House of Assembly.

Economic conditions remained harsh. As in Ireland, the potato which made possible a steady growth in population failed as a result of the Phytophthora infestans blight. The number of deaths from the 1846–1848 Newfoundland potato famine remains unknown, but there was pervasive hunger. Along with other half-hearted measures to relieve the distress, Governor John Gaspard Le Marchant declared a "Day of Public Fasting and Humiliation" in hopes the Almighty might pardon their sins and "withdraw his afflicting hand." The wave of post-famine emigration from Ireland notably passed over Newfoundland.

==== Era of responsible government ====
Fisheries revived, and the devolution of responsibilities from London continued. In 1854, the British government established Newfoundland's first responsible government, an executive accountable to the colonial legislature. In 1855, with an Assembly majority, the Liberals under Philip Francis Little (the first Roman Catholic to practise law in St. John's) formed Newfoundland's first parliamentary government (1855–1858). Newfoundland rejected confederation with Canada in the 1869 general election. The Islanders were preoccupied with land issues—the Escheat movement with its call to suppress absentee landlordism in favour of the tenant farmer. Canada offered little in the way of solutions.

From the 1880s, as cod fishery fell into severe decline, there was large-scale emigration. While some people, working abroad, left their homes on a seasonal or temporary basis more began to leave permanently. Most emigrants (largely Catholic and of Irish descent) moved to Canada, many to find work in the steel plants and coal mines of Nova Scotia. There was also a considerable outflow to the United States and, in particular, to New England.

In 1892, St. John's burned. The Great Fire left 12,000 homeless. In 1894, the two commercial banks in Newfoundland collapsed. These bankruptcies left a vacuum that was subsequently filled by Canadian chartered banks, a change that subordinated Newfoundland to Canadian monetary policies.

Newfoundland lay outside the direct route of world traffic. St. John's, 3,200 km (2,000 mi) from Liverpool and about 1,000 miles from the east-coast American cities, was not a port of call for Atlantic liners. But with the co-ordination and extension of the railway system, new prospects for development opened in the interior. Paper and pulp mills were established by the Anglo-Newfoundland Development Co. at Grand Falls for the supply of the publishing empires in the UK of Lord Northcliffe and Lord Rothermere. Iron ore mines were established at Bell Island.

=== British Dominion ===
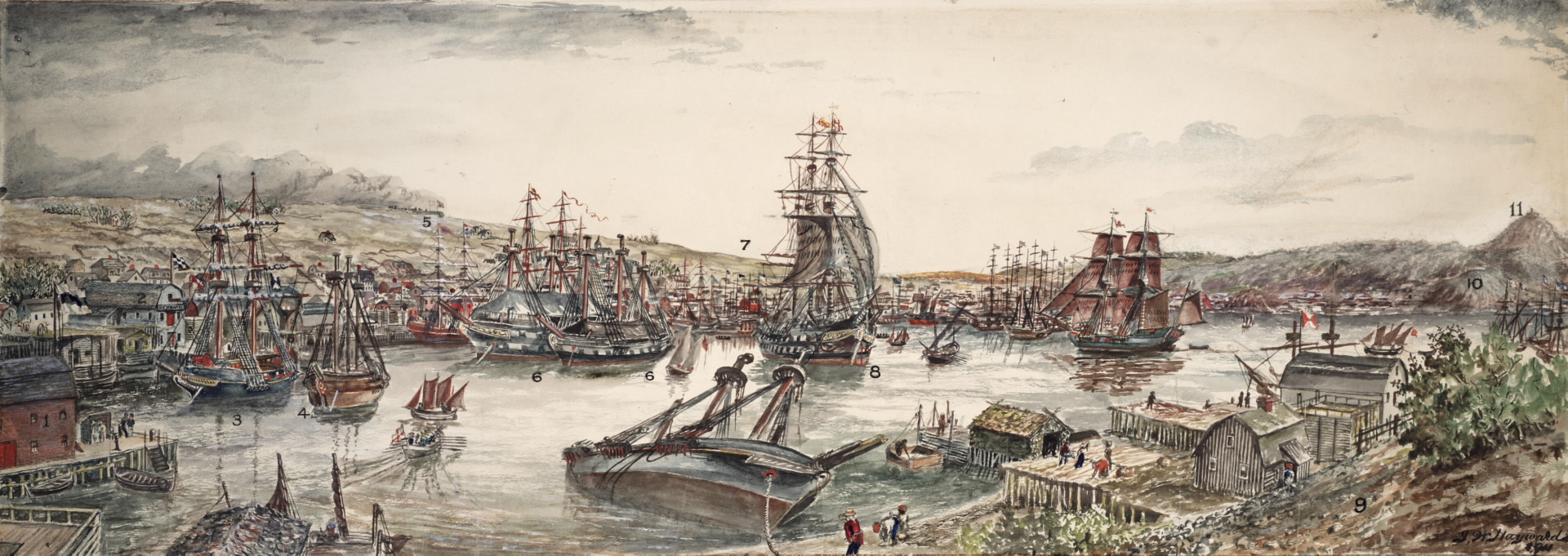
Town and Harbour of St. John's, 1911 by John William Hayward

==== Reform and the Fisherman's Union ====
In 1907, Newfoundland acquired dominion status, or self-government, within the British Empire or British Commonwealth. Government of Newfoundland was conducted mostly by a cabinet accountable solely to the legislature in St. John's, subject only to occasional policy changes from the British government, for example vetoing a trade agreement Newfoundland had negotiated with the United States. A new reform-minded government was formed under Edward Morris, a senior Catholic politician who had split from the Liberals to form the People's Party. It extended education provision, introduced old-age pensions, initiated agriculture and trade schemes and, with a trade union act, provided a legal framework for collective bargaining.

There had been unions seeking to negotiate wage rates in the shipbuilding trades since the 1850s. Those working the fishing boats were not wage earners but commodity producers, like farmers, reliant on merchant credit. Working in small, competitive, often family, units, scattered in isolated communities, they also had little occasion to gather in large numbers to discuss common concerns. These obstacles to organization were overcome from 1908 by a new co-operative movement, the Fishermen's Protective Union (FPU). Mobilizing more than 21,000 members in 206 councils across the island; more than half of Newfoundland's fishermen, the FPU challenged the economic control of the island's merchantocracy. Despite opposition from the Catholic Church which objected to the FPU's oath taking and alleged socialism, led by William Coaker the candidates for the FPU won 8 of 36 seats in the House of Assembly in the 1913 general election.

At the beginning of 1914, economic conditions seemed favourable to reform. In a little over a decade, exports, imports and state revenue had more than doubled. Schemes were afoot for the exploitation of coal and mineral resources, and for the utilisation of peat beds for fuel. Benefiting from the settlement of disputes over fishing rights with France in 1904, and with the New England states in 1910, the fishing industry was looking to develop new markets.

==== First World War and its aftermath ====
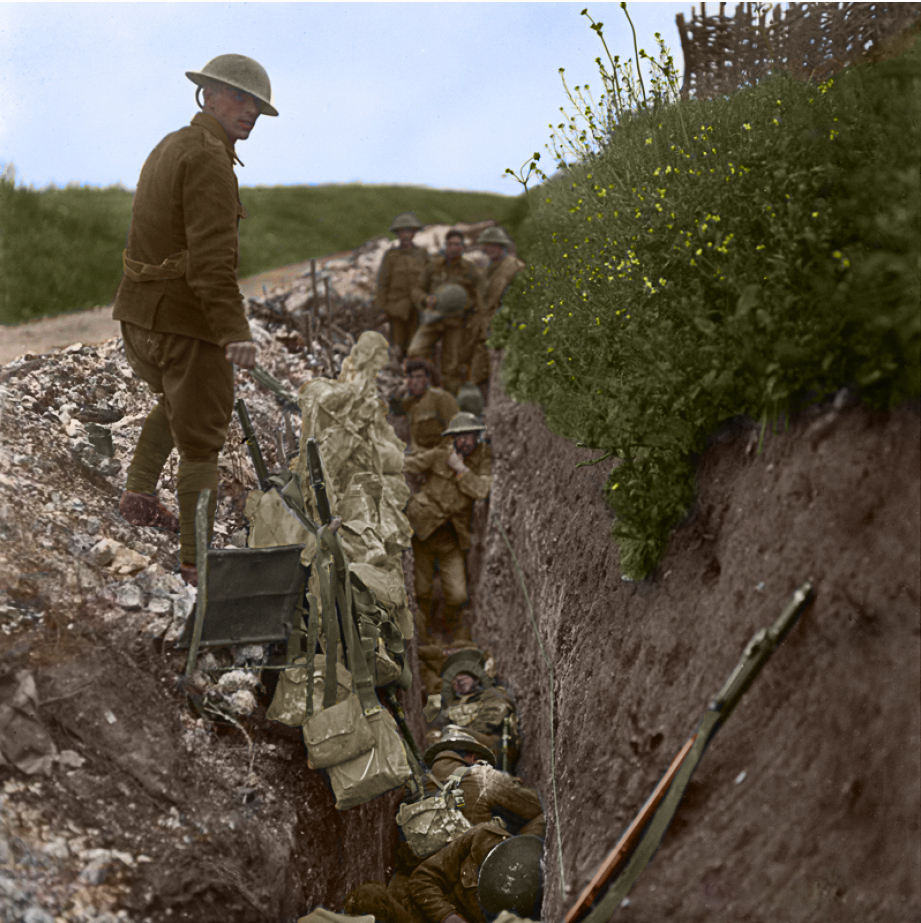
Colourized photo of soldiers in St. John's Road, a support trench, 200 metres behind the British forward line at Beaumont Hamel, 1916

In August 1914, Britain declared war on Germany. Out of a total population of about 250,000, Newfoundland offered up some 12,000 men for Imperial service (including 3,000 who joined the Canadian Expeditionary Force). About a third of these were to serve in 1st Newfoundland Regiment, which after service in the Gallipoli Campaign, was nearly wiped out at Beaumont-Hamel on the first day on the Somme, July 1, 1916. The regiment, which the Dominion government had chosen to raise, equip, and train at its own expense, was resupplied and went on to serve with distinction in several subsequent battles, earning the prefix "Royal". The overall fatality and casualty rate for the regiment was high: 1,281 dead, 2,284 wounded.

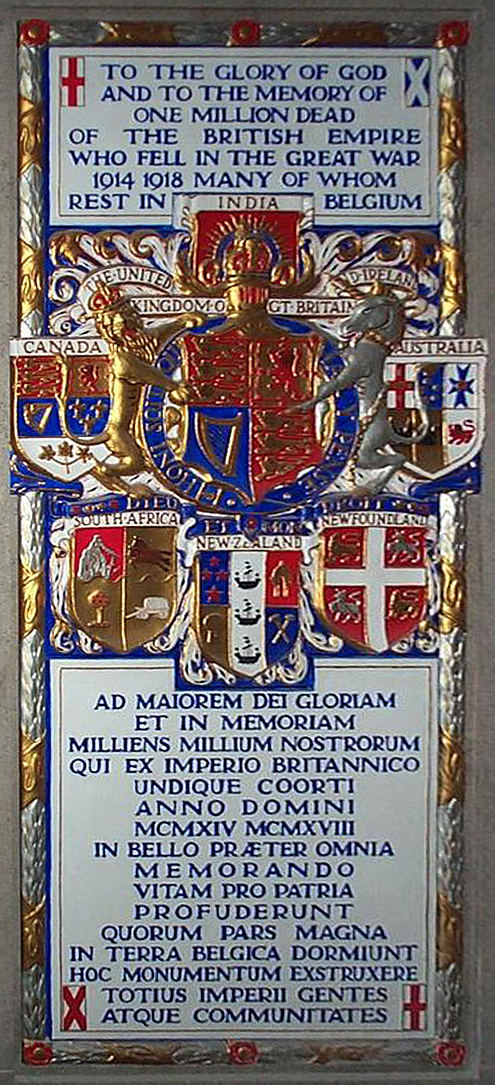
First World War memorial in Brussels depicting the arms of Newfoundland alongside other parts of the British Empire.

The FPU members joined Edward Patrick Morris' wartime National Government of 1917, but their reputation suffered when they failed to abide by their promise not to support military conscription without a referendum. In 1919, the FPU joined with the Liberals to form the Liberal Reform Party whose success in the 1919 general election allowed Coaker to continue as Fisheries Minister. But there was little he could do to sustain the credibility of the FPU in the face of the post-war slump in fish prices, and the subsequent high unemployment and emigration. At the same time the Dominion's war debt due to the regiment and the cost of the trans-island railway, limited the government's ability to provide relief.

In the spring of 1918, in midst of disquiet over wartime inflation and profiteering, there had been protest. The Newfoundland Industrial Workers' Association (NIWA) struck both the rail and steamship operations of the Reid Newfoundland Company, effectively isolating the capital and threatening the annual seal hunt. Central to the eventual settlement were not only wage increases, but "the great principle that employees are entitled to be heard in all matters connected with their welfare".

When in January 1919, Sinn Féin formed the Dáil Éireann in Dublin, the Irish question and local sectarian tensions resurfaced in Newfoundland. In the course of 1920 many Catholics of Irish descent in St. John's joined the local branch of the Self-Determination for Ireland League (SDIL). Although tempered by expressions of loyalty to the Empire, the League's vocal support for Irish self-government was opposed by the local Orange Order. Claiming to represent 20,000 "loyal citizens", the Order was composed almost exclusively of Anglicans or Methodists of English descent. Tensions ran sufficiently high that Catholic Archbishop Edward Roche felt constrained to caution League organisers against the hazards of "a sectarian war."

Since the early 1800s, Newfoundland and Quebec (or Lower Canada) had been in a border dispute over the Labrador region. In 1927, the British Judicial Committee of the Privy Council ruled that the area known as modern-day Labrador was to be considered part of the Dominion of Newfoundland.

=== Commission government ===
==== The Great Depression and the return of colonial rule ====
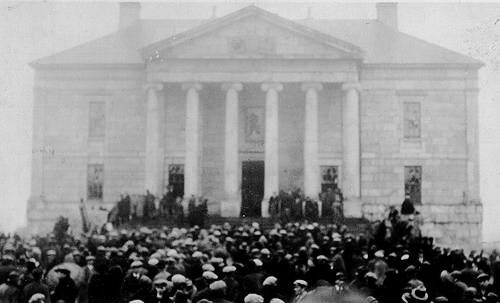
People in front of the Colonial Building protesting against economic conditions, 1932. In the next year, the government of Newfoundland collapsed, and the British government resumed direct control over Newfoundland.

Following the stock market crash in 1929, the international market for much of Newfoundland and Labrador's goods—saltfish, pulp paper and minerals—decreased dramatically. In 1930, the country earned $40 million from its exports; that number dropped to $23.3 million in 1933. The fishery suffered particularly heavy losses as salted cod that sold for $8.90 a quintal in 1929 fetched only half that amount by 1932. With this precipitous loss of export income, the level of debt Newfoundland carried from the Great War and from construction of the Newfoundland Railway proved unsustainable. In 1931, the Dominion defaulted. Newfoundland survived with assistance from the United Kingdom and Canada but, in the summer of 1933, faced with unprecedented economic problems at home, Canada decided against any further support.

Following retrenchment in all the Dominion's major industries, the government laid off close to one third of its civil servants and cut the wages of those it retained. For the first time since the 1880s, malnutrition was facilitating the spread of beriberi, tuberculosis and other diseases.

The British had a stark choice: accept financial collapse in Newfoundland or pay the full cost of keeping the country solvent. The solution, accepted by the legislature in 1933, was to accept a de facto return to direct colonial rule. In exchange for loan guarantees by the Crown and a promise that self-government would in time be re-established, the legislature in St. John's voted itself out of existence. On February 16, 1934, the Commission of Government was sworn in, ending 79 years of responsible government. The Commission consisted of seven persons appointed by the British government. For 15 years, no elections took place, and no legislature was convened.

Between 1934 and 1939, the Commission of Government managed the situation but the underlying problem, world-wide depression, resisted solution. The dispirited state of the country is said to have been evident in "'the lack of cheering and of visible enthusiasm' in the crowds that came out to see King George VI and Queen Elizabeth during their brief visit in June 1939."

==== Second World War ====
The situation changed dramatically, after Newfoundland and Labrador, with no responsible government of its own, was automatically committed to war as a result of Britain's ultimatum to Germany in September 1939. Unlike in 1914–1918, when the Dominion government volunteered and financed a full expeditionary regiment, there would be no separate presence overseas and, by implication, no compulsory enlistment. Volunteers filled the ranks of Newfoundland units in both the Royal Artillery and the Royal Air Force, and of the largest single contingent of Newfoundlanders to go overseas, the Newfoundland Overseas Forestry Unit. As a result, and taking into account service in the Newfoundland Militia, and in the merchant marine, as in the First World War about 12,000 Newfoundlanders were at one time or another directly or indirectly involved in the war effort.

In June 1940, following the defeat of France and the German occupation of most of Western Europe, the Commission of Government, with British approval, authorized Canadian forces to help defend Newfoundland's air bases for the duration of the war. Canada's military commitment greatly increased in 1941 when German submarines began to attack the large numbers of merchant ships in the north-west Atlantic. In addition to reinforcing the bomber squadron at Gander, the Royal Canadian Air Force provided a further squadron of bombers that flew from a new airport Canada built at Torbay (the present St. John's airport). From November 1940, a new airbase at Gander became one of the so called "sally-ports of freedom" with U.S. manufactured aircraft flying in swarms to Britain.

In March 1941, the United Kingdom conceded to the United States (then still officially neutral) what were effectively U.S. sovereign base rights. The Americans chose properties at St. John's, where they established an army base (Fort Pepperrell) and a dock facility; at Argentia/Marquise, where they built a naval air base and an army base (Fort McAndrew); and at Stephenville, where they built a large airfield (Ernest Harmon Airbase). As allies after December 1941, the Americans were also accommodated at Torbay, Goose Bay and Gander.

This garrisoning of Newfoundland had profound economic, political and social consequences. Enlistment for service abroad and the base building boom at home eliminated the chronic unemployment of the previous decades. By 1942, the country enjoyed full employment and could spend more on health, education and housing but was also making interest-free loans of Canadian dollars to the hard-pressed British. At the same time, the presence of so many Canadians and Americans, complete with entertainment and consumer goods, promoted a taste for the more affluent consumerism that had been developing throughout North America.

==== The National Convention ====
When prosperity returned with the Second World War, agitation began to end the Commission and reinstate responsible government. Instead, the British government created the National Convention in 1946. Chaired by Judge Cyril J. Fox, the Convention consisted of 45 elected members from across the dominion and was formally tasked with advising on the future of Newfoundland.

Several motions were made by Joey Smallwood, a convention member who later served as the first provincial premier of Newfoundland, to examine joining Canada by sending a delegation to Ottawa. The first motion was defeated although the Convention later decided to send delegations to both London and Ottawa to explore alternatives. In January 1948, the National Convention voted against adding the issue of Confederation to the referendum 29 to 16, but the British, who controlled the National Convention and the subsequent referendum, overruled that move. Those who supported Confederation were extremely disappointed with the recommendations of the National Convention and organized a petition, signed by more than 50,000 Newfoundlanders, demanding that Confederation with Canada be placed before the people in the upcoming referendum. As most historians agree, the British government keenly wanted Confederation on the ballot and ensured its inclusion.

=== Canadian province ===
==== Referendums on confederation ====
Three main factions actively campaigned during the lead-up to the referendums on confederation with Canada:

- The Confederate Association (CA), led by Smallwood, advocated entry into the Canadian Confederation. They campaigned through a newspaper known as The Confederate.
- The Responsible Government League (RGL), led by Peter Cashin, advocated an independent Newfoundland with a return to responsible government. Their newspaper was The Independent.
- The smaller Economic Union Party (EUP), led by Chesley Crosbie, advocated closer economic ties with the United States. A 1947 Gallup poll found 80% of Newfoundland residents wanting to become Americans, but the United States had no interest in the proposal and preferred for Newfoundland to join Canada. The EUP failed to gain much support and after the first referendum merged with the RGL.

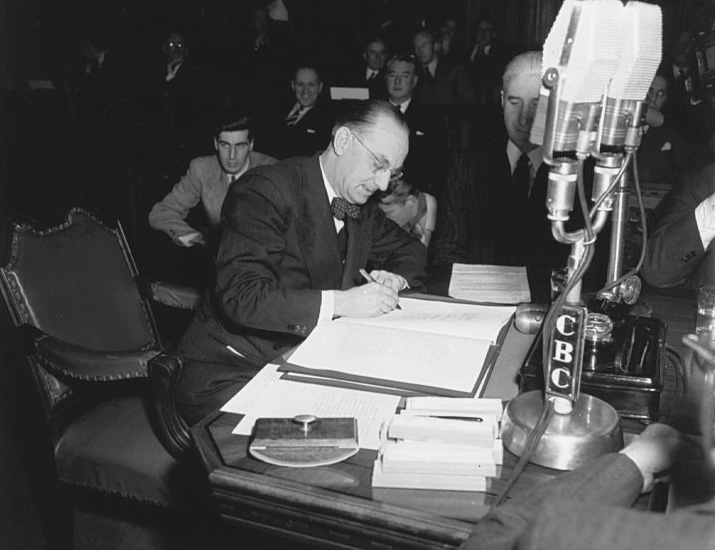
Joey Smallwood signing a document bringing Newfoundland into the Canadian Confederation, 1948

The first referendum took place on June 3, 1948; 44.6% of people voted for responsible government, 41.1% voted for confederation with Canada, while 14.3% voted for the Commission of Government. Since none of the choices had gained more than 50%, a second referendum with only the two more popular choices was held on July 22, 1948. The official outcome of that referendum was 52.3% for confederation with Canada and 47.7% for responsible (independent) government. After the referendum, the British governor named a seven-man delegation to negotiate Canada's offer on behalf of Newfoundland. After six of the delegation signed, the British government passed the British North America Act, 1949 through the Parliament of the United Kingdom. Newfoundland officially joined Canada at midnight on March 31, 1949.

As documents in British and Canadian archives became available in the 1980s, it became evident that both Canada and the United Kingdom had wanted Newfoundland to join Canada. Some have charged a conspiracy to manoeuvre Newfoundland into Confederation in exchange for forgiveness of Britain's war debt and for other considerations. Yet, most historians who have examined the relevant documents have concluded that while Britain engineered the inclusion of a Confederation option in the referendum, Newfoundlanders made the final decision themselves, if by a narrow margin.

Following the referendum, there was a rumour that the referendum had been narrowly won by the "responsible government" side but that the result had been fixed by the British governor. Shortly after the referendum, several boxes of ballots from St. John's were burned by order of Herman William Quinton, one of only two commissioners who supported confederation. Some have argued that independent oversight of the vote tallying was lacking though the process was supervised by respected Corner Brook Magistrate Nehemiah Short, who had also overseen elections to the National Convention.

==== 1959 Woodworkers' strike ====
In 1959, a strike led by the International Woodworkers of America (IWA) that resulted the "most bitter labour dispute in Newfoundland's history." Smallwood, although he had himself been an organizer in the lumber industry, feared that the strike would shut down what had become the province's largest employer. His government introduced emergency legislation that immediately decertified the IWA, prohibited secondary picketing and made unions liable for illegal acts committed on their behalf.

The International Labour Organization, Canadian Labour Congress, and the Newfoundland Federation of Labour condemned the legislation, and Canadian Prime Minister John Diefenbaker refused to provide the province with additional police to enforce the legislation. However, running out of food and money, the loggers eventually abandoned the strike, joined Smallwood's newly created Newfoundland Brotherhood of Wood Workers, and negotiated a settlement with the logging companies that ended the strike and effectively undermined the IWA.

==== Resettlement programs ====
From the early 1950s, the provincial government pursued a policy of population transfer by centralizing the rural population. A resettlement of the many isolated communities scattered along Newfoundland's coasts was seen as a way to save rural Newfoundland by moving people to what were referred to as "growth centres." That was believed to allow the government to provide more and better public services such as education, health care, roads and electricity. It was also expected to create more employment opportunities outside of the fishery or in spinoff industries, which meant a stronger and more modern fishing industry for those remaining in it.

Three attempts of resettlement were initiated by the Government between 1954 and 1975, which resulted in the abandonment of 300 communities and nearly 30,000 people moved. Denounced as poorly resourced and as a historic injustice, resettlement has been viewed as possibly the most controversial government policy of the post-Confederation Newfoundland and Labrador.

Many of the remaining small rural outports were hit by the 1992 cod moratorium. The loss of an important source of income caused widespread out-migration. In the 21st century, the Community Relocation Policy allows for voluntary relocation of isolated settlements. Eight communities have moved between 2002 and 2018. At the end of 2019, the decommissioning of ferry and hydroelectricity services ended settlement on the Little Bay Islands.

=== 21st century ===
==== Climate change ====
In the new century, the provincial government is anticipating the challenges of global warming. Locally average annual temperatures are variously estimated to be already between 0.8 °C and 1.5 °C above historical norms and the frequency of hurricanes and tropical storms have doubled in comparison to the last century. As a result, the province is experiencing increased permafrost melt, flooding, and infrastructure damage, reduced sea ice, and greater risk from new invasive species and infectious diseases.

The government believes that in just fifty years (2000–2050), temperatures in Newfoundland will have risen by two and a half to three degrees in summer and three and a half to five degrees in winter, and that in Labrador warming will be even more severe. Under those conditions the winter season could shorten by as much as four to five weeks in some locations and that extreme storm events could result in an increase of precipitation by over 20% or more, enhancing the likelihood and magnitude of flooding. Meanwhile, sea levels are anticipated to rise by a half meter, putting coastal infrastructure at risk. Against these hazards, the government sets the province's "vast renewable [wind, sea and hydro] energy resources" with their potential to reduce carbon emissions in the province and elsewhere.

In April 2023, following years of delays and billions of dollars in cost overruns, a major hydro-generation project at Muskrat Falls, was declared complete with the final testing of the 1,100 km transmission link from the site in Labrador to a converter station outside St John's. Theoretically it could replace all the province's existing hydro-carbon sources of electricity. On the other hand, critics note that, in the decade to 2030, the government plans to double offshore oil production, significantly adding to emissions.

On January 17, 2020, the province experienced a large blizzard, nicknamed 'Snowmageddon', with winds up to 134 km/h (83 mph). The communities of St. John's, Mount Pearl, Paradise, and Torbay declared a state of emergency. On January 18, 2020, Premier Dwight Ball said his request for aid from the Canadian Armed Forces was approved, and troops from the 2nd Battalion of the Royal Newfoundland Regiment, CFB Halifax, and CFB Gagetown would arrive in the province to assist with snow-clearing and emergency services. An avalanche hit a house in The Battery section of St. John's. St. John's mayor Danny Breen said the storm cost the city $7 million.

==== The COVID-19 pandemic ====
The province announced its first presumptive case of COVID-19 on March 14, 2020, and declared a public health emergency on March 18. Health orders, including the closure of non-essential businesses and mandatory self-isolation for all travellers entering the province (including from within Canada), were enacted over the days that followed.

The emergency and all COVID-related restrictions ended in February 2022. There had been 18,464 recorded cases of persons testing positive for the virus, including 46 deaths.

== Demographics ==
Population density of Newfoundland and Labrador

=== Population ===
Historical populations
| Year | Pop. | ±% |
|---|---|---|
| 1825 | 55,719 | — |
| 1836 | 75,094 | +34.8% |
| 1845 | 96,295 | +28.2% |
| 1851 | 101,600 | +5.5% |
| 1857 | 124,288 | +22.3% |
| 1869 | 146,536 | +17.9% |
| 1874 | 161,374 | +10.1% |
| 1884 | 197,335 | +22.3% |
| 1891 | 202,040 | +2.4% |
| 1901 | 220,984 | +9.4% |
| 1911 | 242,619 | +9.8% |
| 1921 | 263,033 | +8.4% |
| 1935 | 289,588 | +10.1% |
| 1945 | 321,819 | +11.1% |
| 1951 | 361,416 | +12.3% |
| 1956 | 415,074 | +14.8% |
| 1961 | 457,853 | +10.3% |
| 1966 | 493,396 | +7.8% |
| 1971 | 522,100 | +5.8% |
| 1976 | 557,720 | +6.8% |
| 1981 | 567,681 | +1.8% |
| 1986 | 568,350 | +0.1% |
| 1991 | 568,475 | +0.0% |
| 1996 | 551,790 | −2.9% |
| 2001 | 512,930 | −7.0% |
| 2006 | 505,469 | −1.5% |
| 2011 | 514,536 | +1.8% |
| 2016 | 519,716 | +1.0% |
| 2021 | 510,550 | −1.8% |
| 2023 (Est.) | 540,418 | +5.9% |
Source: and Statistics Canada "Historical Statistics of Newfoundland and Labrador" (PDF). Government of Newfoundland and Labrador. November 1994. Archived (PDF) from the original on February 23, 2022.

As of October 1, 2021, Newfoundland and Labrador had a population of 521,758. More than half the population lives on the Avalon Peninsula of Newfoundland, site of the capital and historical early settlement. Since 2006, the population of the province has started to increase for the first time since the early 1990s. In the 2006 census, the population of the province decreased by 1.5% compared to 2001 and stood at 505,469. But, by the 2011 census, the population had risen by 1.8%.

At the beginning of 2021, Newfoundland and Labrador started accepting applications for a Priority Skills immigration program. Focusing on highly educated, highly skilled newcomers with specialized experience in areas where demand has outpaced local training and recruitment, such as technology and ocean sciences occupations, the government hopes the program will attract 2,500 new permanent residents annually.

| Municipality | 2006 | 2011 | 2016 | 2021 |
|---|---|---|---|---|
| St. John's | 100,646 | 106,172 | 108,860 | 110,525 |
| Conception Bay South | 21,966 | 24,848 | 26,199 | 27,168 |
| Paradise | 12,584 | 17,695 | 21,389 | 22,957 |
| Mount Pearl | 24,671 | 24,284 | 22,957 | 22,477 |
| Corner Brook | 20,083 | 19,886 | 19,806 | 19,333 |
| Grand Falls-Windsor | 13,558 | 13,725 | 14,171 | 13,853 |
| Gander | 9,951 | 11,054 | 11,688 | 11,880 |
| Portugal Cove-St. Philip's | 6,575 | 7,366 | 8,147 | 8,415 |
| Happy Valley-Goose Bay | 7,519 | 7,572 | 8,109 | 8,040 |
| Torbay | 6,281 | 7,397 | 7,899 | 7,852 |
Table source: Statistics Canada

=== Ethnicity ===
According to the 2021 Canadian census, the largest ethnic group in Newfoundland and Labrador is English (175,045; 34.9%), followed by Irish (122,115; 24.3%), Scottish (33,270; 6.6%), French (22,925; 4.6%), and Mi'kmaq (18,870; 3.8%). In addition 24.9% (125,120) of the population identified as Canadian ethnic origin and 6.9% (34,640) as Newfoundlander. According to the 2001 Canadian census, the largest ethnic group in Newfoundland and Labrador was English (39.4%), followed by Irish (19.7%), Scots (6.0%), French (5.5%) and First Nations (3.2%). While half of all respondents also identified their ethnicity as "Canadian", 38% report their ethnicity as "Newfoundlander" in a 2003 Statistics Canada Ethnic Diversity Survey.

During the initial registration phase for the Qalipu Miꞌkmaq First Nation Band in 2013, more than 100,000 Newfoundlanders applied for membership (equivalent to one-fifth of the total population). The subsequent process led to around 24,000 people being recognized as members of the Qalipu First Nation.

=== Language ===
French language ability in Newfoundland and Labrador

As of the 2021 Canadian Census, the ten most spoken languages in the province included English (501,135 or 99.81%), French (26,130 or 5.2%), Arabic (2,195 or 0.44%), Spanish (2,085 or 0.42%), Innu (Montagnais) (1,925 or 0.38%), Tagalog (1,810 or 0.36%), Hindi (1,565 or 0.31%), Mandarin (1,170 or 0.23%), German (1,075 or 0.21%), and Punjabi (1,040 or 0.21%). The question on knowledge of languages allows for multiple responses.

Newfoundland English is a term referring to any of several accents and dialects of the English language found in the province of Newfoundland and Labrador. Most of these differ substantially from the English commonly spoken elsewhere in neighbouring Canada and the North Atlantic. Many Newfoundland dialects are similar to the dialects of the West Country in England, particularly the city of Bristol and counties of Cornwall, Devon, Dorset, Hampshire and Somerset, while other Newfoundland dialects resemble those of Ireland's southeastern counties, particularly Waterford, Wexford, Kilkenny and Cork. Still others blend elements of both, and there is also a discernible influence of Scottish English. While the Scots came in smaller numbers than the English and Irish, they had a large influence on Newfoundland society.

Local place names in the Irish language include Newfoundland (Talamh an Éisc, Land of the Fish) and St. John's (Baile Sheáin) Ballyhack (Baile Hac), Cappahayden (Ceapach Éidín), Kilbride and St. Bride's (Cill Bhríde), Duntara, Port Kirwan and Skibbereen (Scibirín). While the distinct local dialect of the Irish language in Newfoundland is now extinct, the language is still taught locally and the Gaelic revival organization Conradh na Gaeilge remains active in the province. A distinct local dialect of Scots Gaelic was also once spoken in the Codroy Valley of Newfoundland, following the settlement there, from the middle of the 19th century, of Canadian Gaelic-speakers from Cape Breton, Nova Scotia. Some 150 years later, the language has not entirely disappeared, although it no longer has any fluent speakers. In Canadian Gaelic, the two main names for Newfoundland are Talamh an Èisg and Eilein a' Trosg.

A community of Newfoundland French speakers still exists on the Port au Port Peninsula—a remnant of the "French Shore" along the island's west coast.

Several indigenous languages are spoken in the Province, representing the Algonquian (Miꞌkmaq and Innu) and Eskimo-Aleut (Inuktitut) linguistic families.

Languages of the population – mother tongue (2011)

| Rank | Language | Respondents | Percentage |
|---|---|---|---|
| 1. | English | 498,095 | 97.7 |
| 2. | French | 2,745 | 0.5 |
| 3. | Innu-aimun | 1,585 | 0.3 |
| 4. | Chinese | 1,080 | 0.2 |
| 5. | Spanish | 670 | 0.16 |
| 6. | German | 655 | 0.15 |
| 7. | Inuktitut | 595 | 0.1 |
| 8. | Urdu | 550 | 0.1 |
| 9. | Arabic | 540 | 0.1 |
| 10. | Dutch | 300 | < 0.1 |
| 11. | Russian | 225 | < 0.1 |
| 12. | Italian | 195 | < 0.1 |

=== Religion ===
According to the 2021 census, religious groups in Newfoundland and Labrador included:

- Christianity (413,915 persons or 82.4%)
- Irreligion (80,330 persons or 16.0%)
- Islam (3,995 persons or 0.8%)
- Hinduism (1,200 persons or 0.2%)
- Sikhism (855 persons or 0.2%)
- Buddhism (490 persons or 0.1%)
- Judaism (240 persons or <0.1%)
- Indigenous Spirituality (105 persons or <0.1%)
- Other (965 persons or 0.2%)

The largest single religious denomination by number of adherents according to the 2011 National Household Survey was the Roman Catholic Church, at 35.8% of the province's population (181,590 members). The major Protestant denominations made up 57.3% of the population, with the largest groups being the Anglican Church of Canada at 25.1% of the total population (127,255 members), the United Church of Canada at 15.5% (78,380 members), and the Pentecostal churches at 6.5% (33,195 members), with other Protestant denominations in much smaller numbers. Non-Christians constituted only 6.8% of the population, with the majority of those respondents indicating "no religious affiliation" (6.2% of the population).

The Orange Order is a Protestant fraternity, the lodges in Newfoundland are governed by the Provincial Grand Orange Lodge of Newfoundland & Labrador. The Heritage Foundation of Newfoundland and Labrador designated the Loyal Orange Association's Hall in Bonavista, built in 1907, a Heritage Structure in May 1997. The lodge serves as a central hub for social life, particularly in rural outport communities. Members gather for meetings, dances, and social events. The Twelfth of July, also known as Orangemen's Day, is a provincial public holiday in Newfoundland and Labrador, and schools and most businesses are closed.

The Royal Black Institution, closely linked with the Orange Order, has particularly strong preceptories in Newfoundland, with 73 preceptories. They base their scripture and values on the Protestant Reformation. The governing body for the province is the Grand Black Chapter of Newfoundland, overseeing the local Preceptories. The Institution was introduced to Newfoundland in the mid-19th century, following the rapid expansion of the Orange Order across the colony. Unlike the Orange Order, which often took a prominent role in the political and sectarian debates of 19th-century Newfoundland, the Royal Black Institution historically positioned itself as a more contemplative and religious body.

== Economy ==
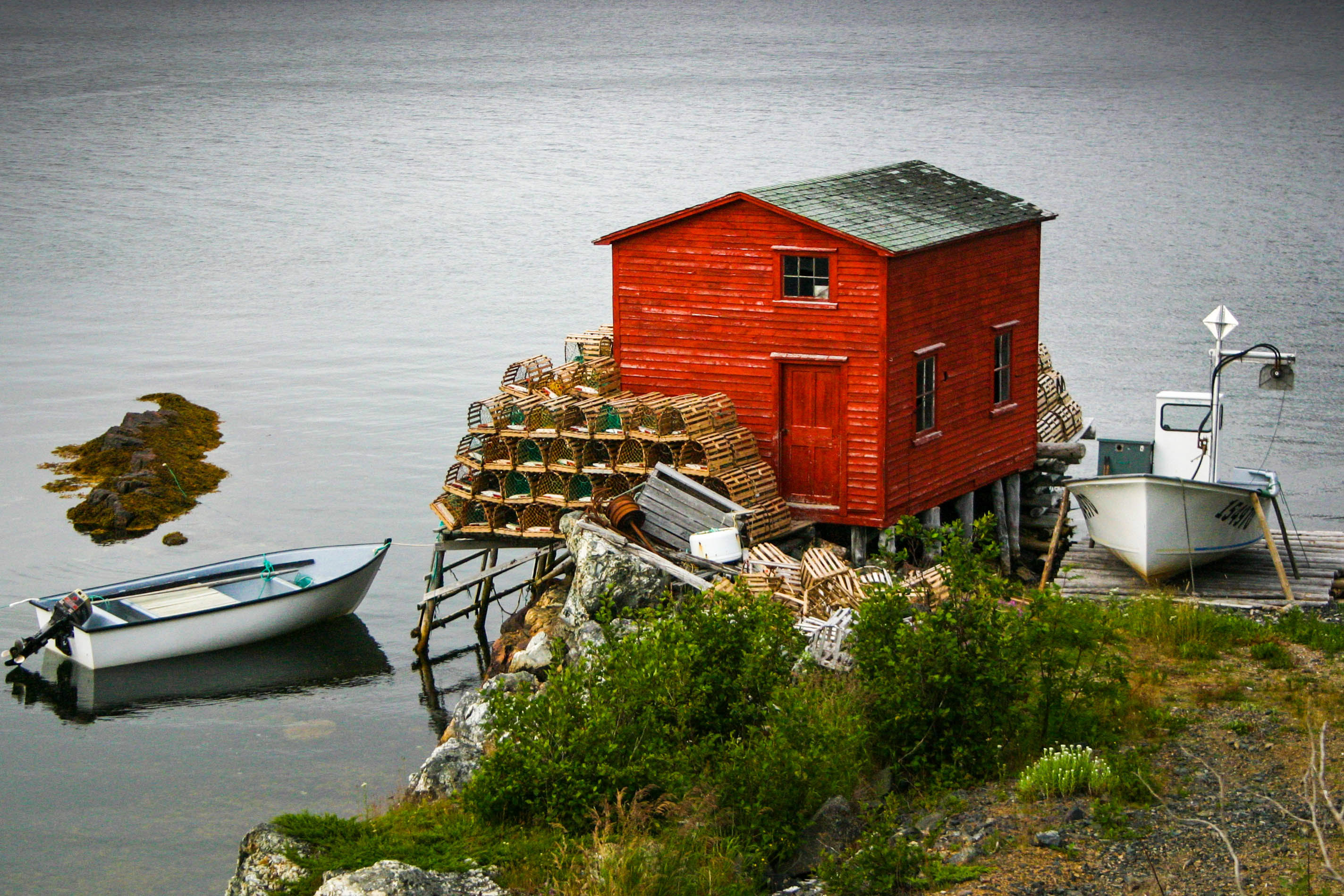
Fishing boats and lobster traps in Salvage, Newfoundland

For many years, Newfoundland and Labrador experienced a depressed economy. Following the collapse of the cod fishery during the early 1990s, the province suffered record unemployment rates and the population decreased by roughly 60,000. Due to a major energy and resources boom, the provincial economy has had a major turnaround since the turn of the 21st century. Unemployment rates decreased, the population stabilized and had moderate growth. The province has gained record surpluses, which has rid it of its status as a "have not" province.

Economic growth, gross domestic product (GDP), exports, and employment resumed in 2010, after suffering the effects of the late-2000s recession. In 2010, total capital investment in the province grew to C$6.2 billion, an increase of 23.0% compared to 2009. 2010 GDP reached $28.1 billion, compared to $25.0 billion in 2009.

=== Primary sector ===
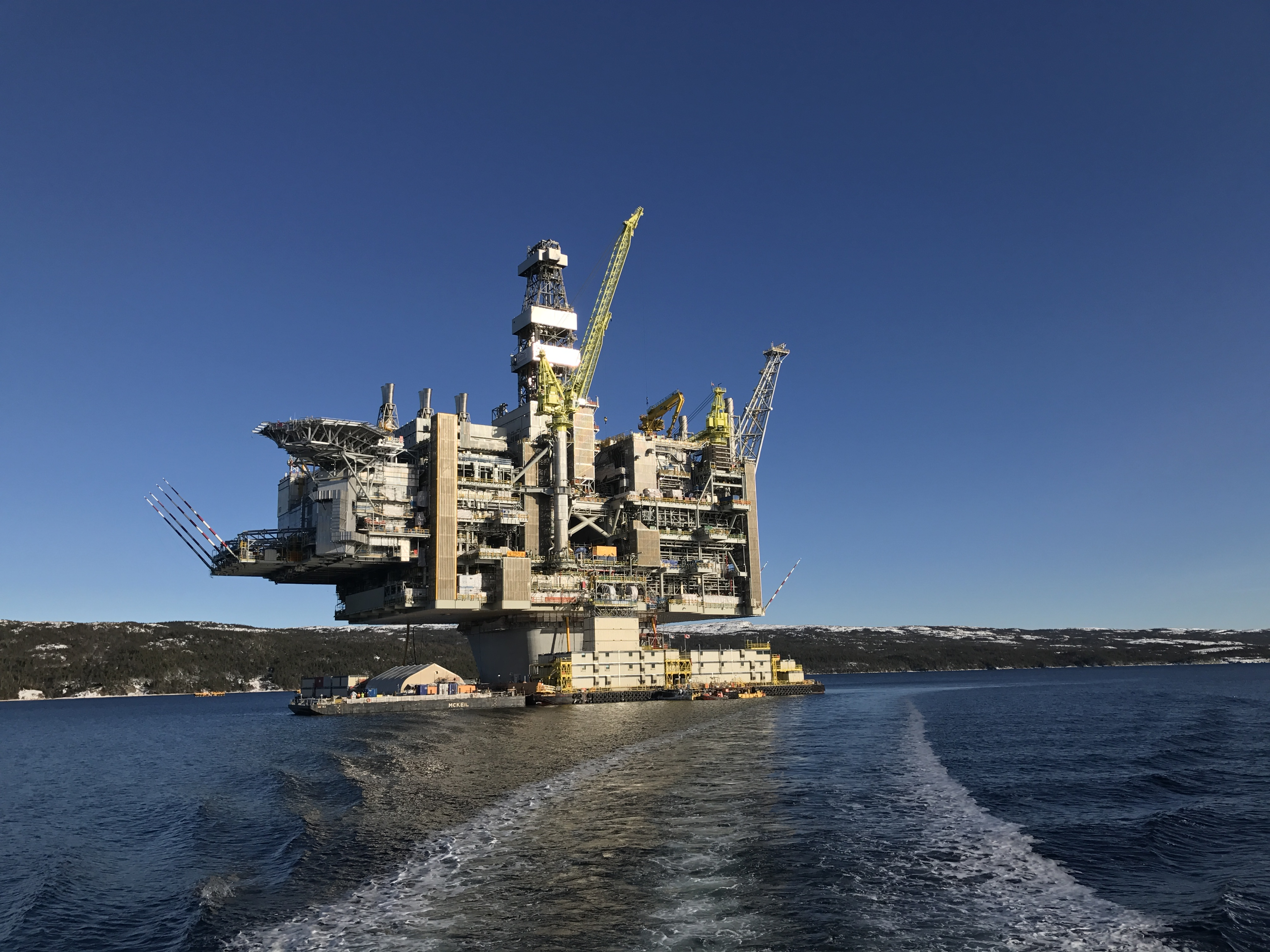
The Hebron oil platform, before being towed out to the Grand Banks

Oil production from offshore oil platforms on the Hibernia, White Rose and Terra Nova oil fields on the Grand Banks was of 110 million bbl (17 million m^{3}), which contributed to more than 15% of the province's GDP in 2006. Total production from the Hibernia field from 1997 to 2006 was 733 million bbl (116.5 million m^{3}) with an estimated value of $36 billion. This will increase with the inclusion of the latest project, Hebron. Remaining reserves are estimated at almost 2 Gbbl (320 million m^{3}) as of December 31, 2006. Exploration for new reserves is ongoing. On June 16, 2009, provincial premier Danny Williams announced a tentative agreement to expand the Hibernia oil field. The government negotiated a 10% equity stake in the Hibernia South expansion, which will add an estimated $10 billion to Newfoundland and Labrador's treasury.

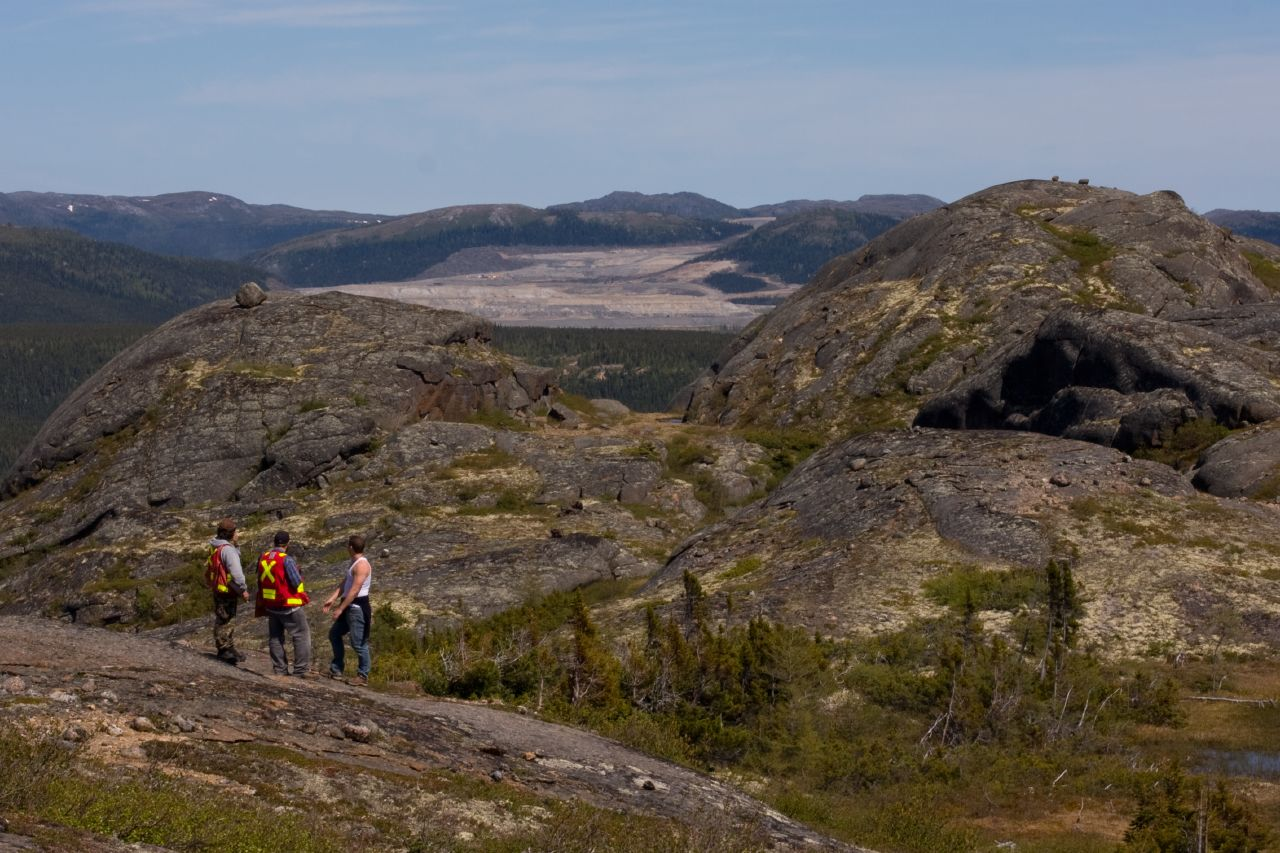
The Voisey's Bay Mine is one of several mines located in the province.

The mining sector in Labrador is still growing. The iron ore mine at Wabush/Labrador City, and the nickel mine in Voisey's Bay produced a total of $3.3 billion worth of ore in 2010. A mine at Duck Pond (30 km (19 mi) south of the now-closed mine at Buchans), started producing copper, zinc, silver and gold in 2007, and prospecting for new ore bodies continues. Mining accounted for 3.5% of the provincial GDP in 2006. The province produces 55% of Canada's total iron ore. Quarries producing dimension stone such as slate and granite, account for less than $10 million worth of material per year.

The fishing industry remains an important part of the provincial economy, employing roughly 20,000 and contributing over $440 million to the GDP. The combined harvest of fish such as cod, haddock, halibut, herring and mackerel was 92,961 tonnes in 2017, with a combined value of $141 million. Shellfish, such as crab, shrimp and clams, accounted for 101,922 tonnes in the same year, yielding $634 million. The value of products from the seal hunt was $1.9 million. In 2015, aquaculture produced over 22,000 tonnes of Atlantic salmon, mussels and steelhead trout worth over $161 million. Oyster production is also forthcoming.

Agriculture in Newfoundland is limited to areas south of St. John's, Cormack, Wooddale, areas near Musgravetown and in the Codroy Valley. Potatoes, rutabagas, turnips, carrots and cabbage are grown for local consumption. Poultry, eggs, and dairy are also produced. Wild blueberries, partridgeberries (lingonberries) and bakeapples (cloudberries) are harvested commercially and used in jams and wine making.

=== Secondary sector ===
Newsprint is produced by one paper mill in Corner Brook with a capacity of 420,000 t (460,000 tons) per year. The value of newsprint exports varies greatly from year to year, depending on the global market price. Lumber is produced by numerous mills in Newfoundland. Apart from seafood processing, paper manufacture and oil refining, manufacturing in the province consists of smaller industries producing food, brewing and other beverage production.

=== Tertiary sector ===
Service industries accounted for the largest share of GDP, especially financial services, health care and public administration. Other significant industries are mining, oil production and manufacturing. The total labour force in 2018 was 261,400 people. Per capita GDP in 2017 was $62,573, higher than the national average and third only to Alberta and Saskatchewan out of Canadian provinces.

Tourism is also a significant contributor to the province's economy. In 2006, nearly 500,000 non-resident tourists visited Newfoundland and Labrador, spending an estimated $366 million. In 2017, non-resident tourists spent an estimated $575 million. Tourism is most popular throughout the months of June–September, the warmest months of the year with the longest hours of daylight.

== Government and politics ==
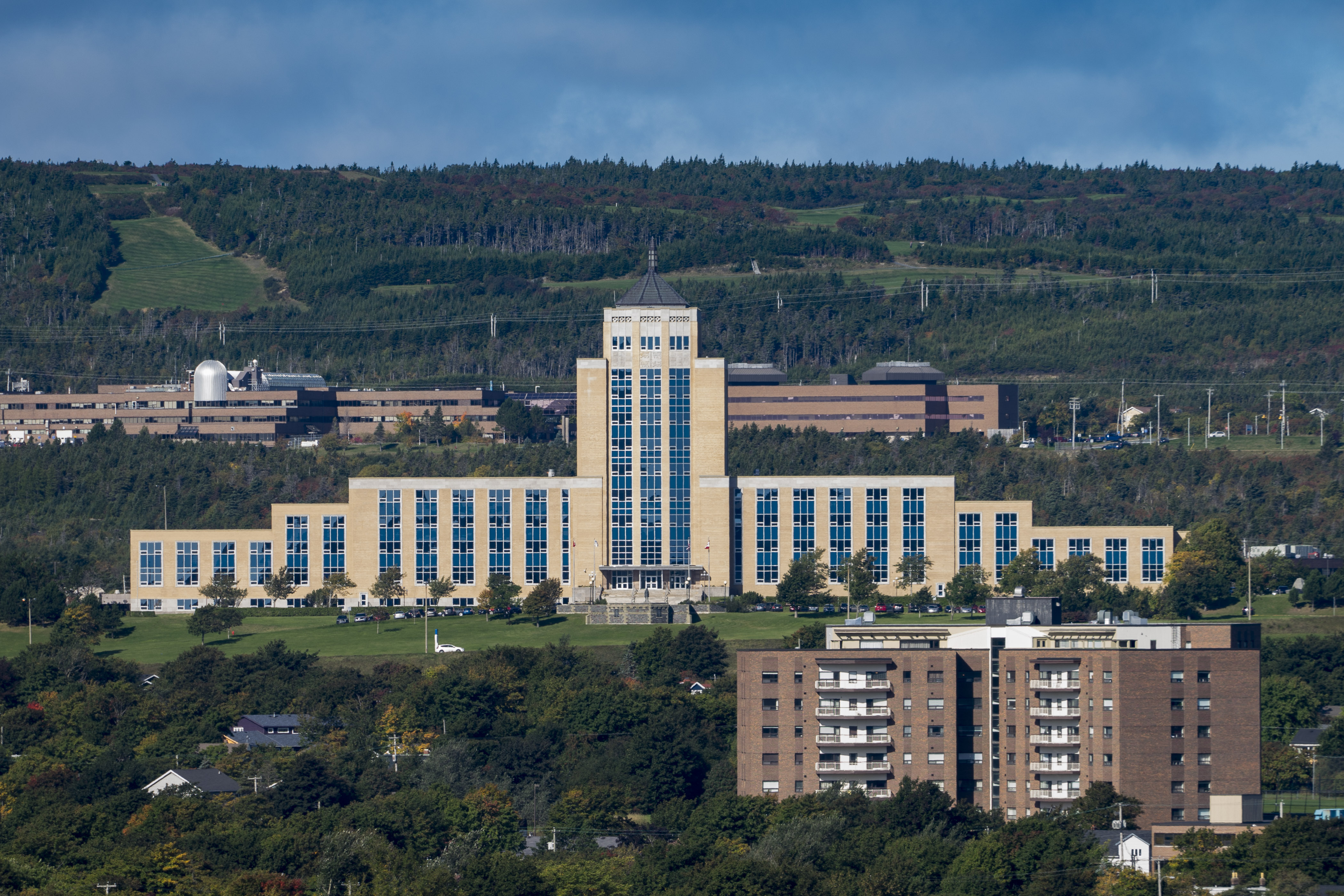
The Confederation Building serves as the meeting place for the Newfoundland and Labrador House of Assembly.

Newfoundland and Labrador is governed by a parliamentary government within the construct of constitutional monarchy; the monarchy in Newfoundland and Labrador is the foundation of the executive, legislative, and judicial branches. The sovereign is King Charles III, who also serves as head of state of 14 other Commonwealth countries, each of Canada's nine other provinces and the Canadian federal realm; he resides in the United Kingdom. The King's representative in Newfoundland and Labrador is the Lieutenant Governor of Newfoundland and Labrador, presently Joan Marie Aylward.

The direct participation of the royal and viceroyal figures in governance is limited; in practice, their use of the executive powers is directed by the Executive Council, a committee of ministers of the Crown responsible to the unicameral, elected House of Assembly. The Council is chosen and headed by the Premier of Newfoundland and Labrador, the head of government. After each general election, the lieutenant governor will usually appoint as premier the leader of the political party that has a majority or plurality in the House of Assembly. The leader of the party with the second-most seats usually becomes the Leader of His Majesty's Loyal Opposition and is part of an adversarial parliamentary system intended to keep the government in check.

Each of the 40 Members of the House of Assembly (MHA) is elected by simple plurality in an electoral district. General elections must be called by the lieutenant governor on the second Tuesday in October four years after the previous election, or may be called earlier, on the advice of the premier, should the government lose a confidence vote in the legislature. Traditionally, politics in the province have been dominated by both the Liberal Party and the Progressive Conservative Party. However, in the 2011 provincial election the New Democratic Party, which had only ever attained minor success, had a major breakthrough and placed second in the popular vote behind the Progressive Conservatives.

== Culture ==
=== Art ===
Before 1950, the visual arts were a minor aspect of Newfoundland cultural life, compared with the performing arts such as music or theatre. Until about 1900, most art was the work of visiting artists, who included members of the Group of Seven, Rockwell Kent and Eliot O'Hara. Artists such as Newfoundland-born Maurice Cullen and Robert Pilot travelled to Europe to study art in prominent ateliers.

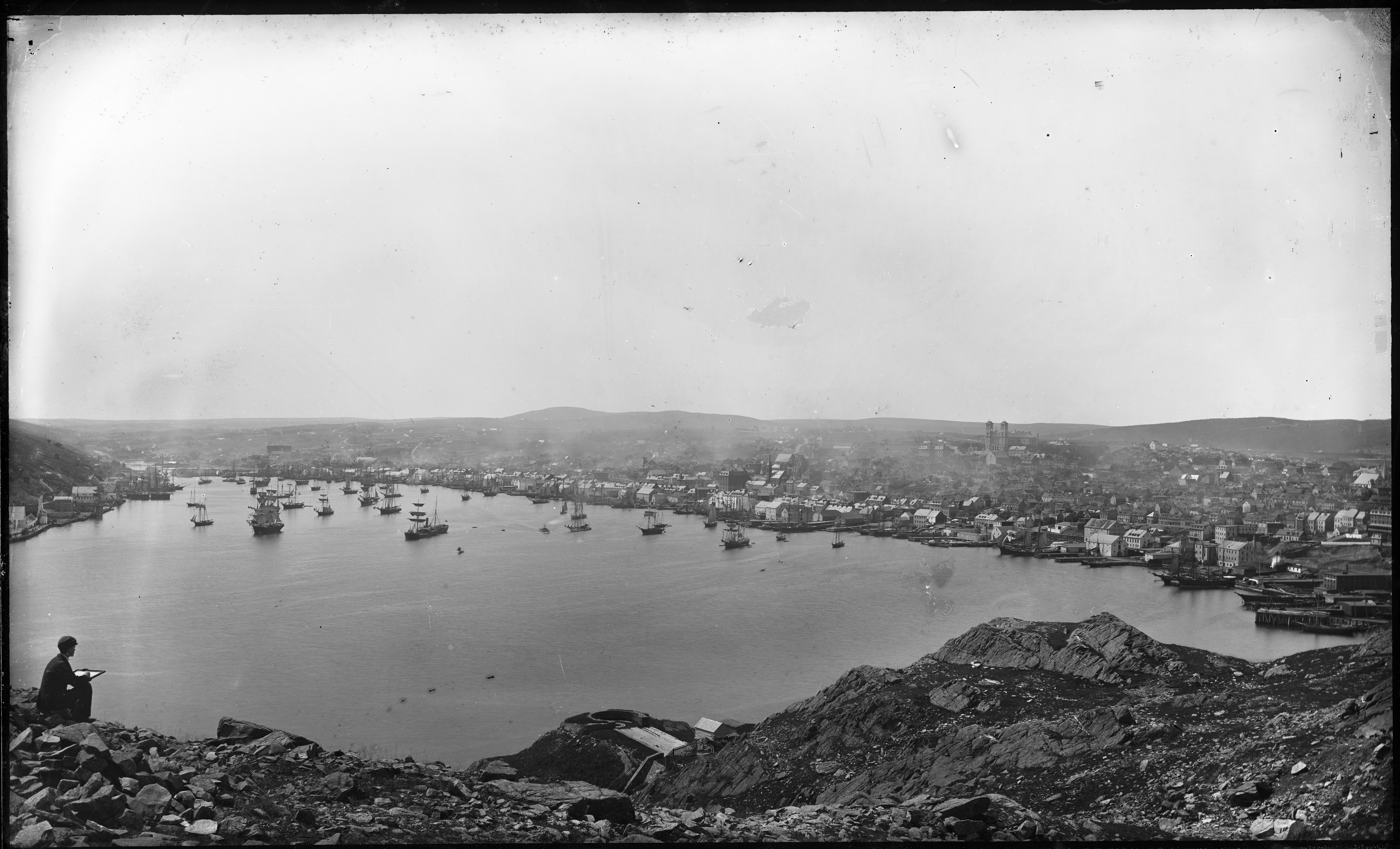
Photograph of an artist sketching St. John's harbour and skyline, c. 1890

By the turn of the 20th century, amateur art was made by people living and working in the province. These artists included J.W. Hayward and his son Thomas B. Hayward, Agnes Marian Ayre, and Harold B. Goodridge, the last of whom worked on a number of mural commissions, notably one for the lobby of the Confederation Building in St. John's. Local art societies became prominent in the 1940s, particularly The Art Students Club, which opened in 1940.

After Newfoundland and Labrador joined Canada in 1949, government grants fostered a supportive environment for visual artists, primarily painters. The visual arts of the province developed significantly in the second half of the century, with the return of young Newfoundland artists whom had studied abroad. Amongst the first were Rae Perlin, who studied at the Art Students League in New York, and Helen Parsons Shepherd and her husband Reginald Shepherd, who both graduated from the Ontario College of Art. The Shepherds established the province's first art school, the Newfoundland Academy of Art.

Newfoundland-born painters Christopher Pratt and Mary Pratt returned to the province in 1961 to work at the newly established Memorial University Art Gallery as its first curator, later transitioning to painting full-time in Salmonier. David Blackwood graduated from the Ontario College of Art in the early 1960s and achieved acclaim with his images of Newfoundland culture and history. Newfoundland-born artist Gerald Squires returned in 1969.

The creation of The Memorial University Extension Services and St. Michael's Printshop in the 1960s and 1970s attracted a number of visual artists to the province to teach and create art. Similarly, the school in Hibb's Hole (now Hibb's Cove), established by painter George Noseworthy, brought professional artists such as Anne Meredith Barry to the province. A notable artist during this period is Marlene Creates.

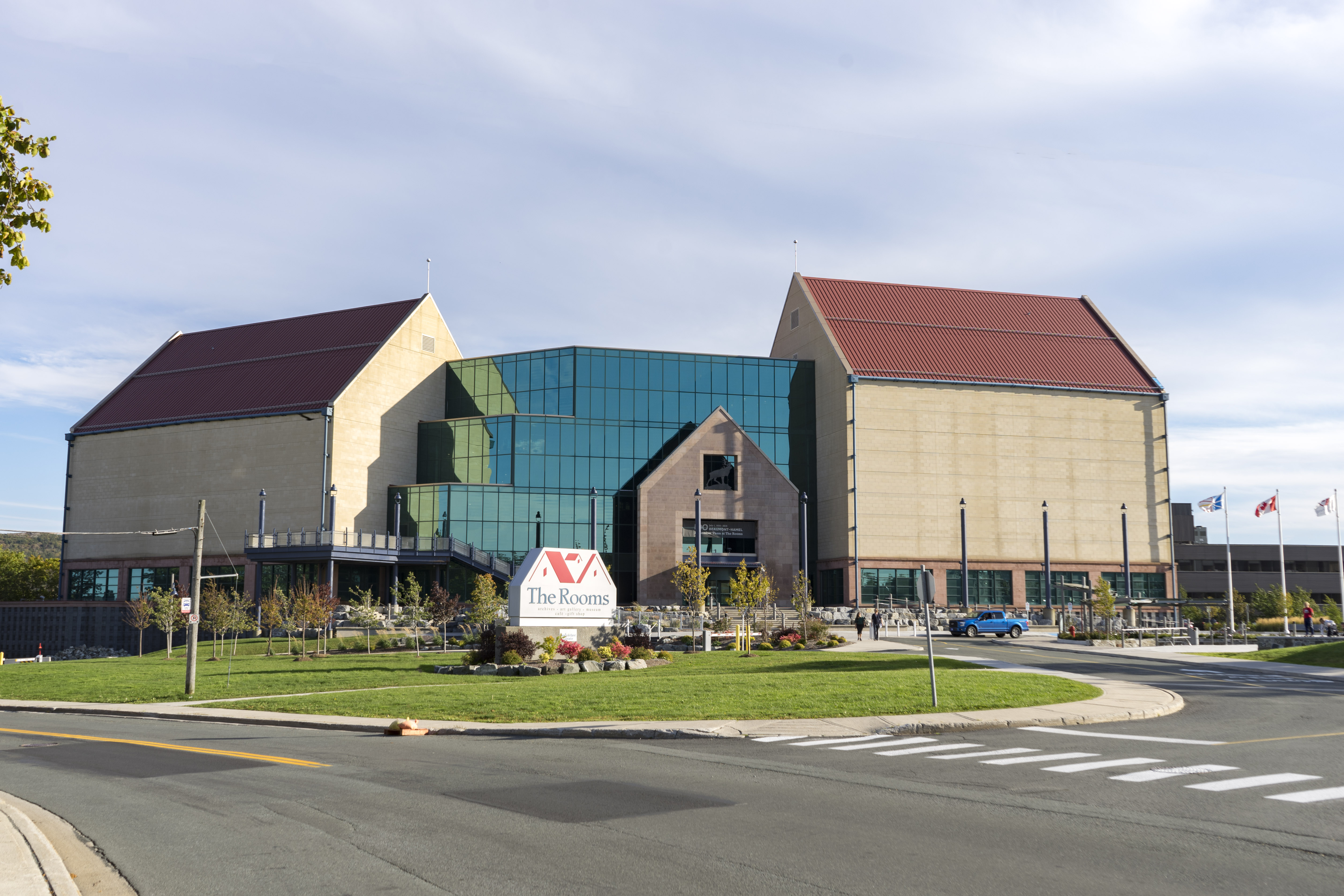
The Rooms is a provincial cultural facility that houses the provincial art gallery.

From 1980 to present, opportunities for artists continued to develop, as galleries such as the Art Gallery of Newfoundland and Labrador (which later became The Rooms Provincial Art Gallery), the Resource Centre for the Arts, and Eastern Edge were established. Fine arts education programs were established at post-secondary institutions such as Sir Wilfred Grenfell College in Corner Brook, the Western Community College (now College of the North Atlantic) in Stephenville, and the Anna Templeton Centre in St. John's.

Newfoundland and Labrador's arts community is recognized nationally and internationally. The creation of Fogo Island Arts in 2008 on Fogo Island created a residency-based contemporary art program for artists, filmmakers, writers, musicians, curators, designers, and thinkers. In 2013 and 2015, the province was represented at the Venice Biennale as Official Collateral Projects. In 2015, Philippa Jones became the first Newfoundland and Labrador artist to be included in the National Gallery of Canada contemporary art biennial. Other notable contemporary artists who have received national and international attention include Will Gill, Kym Greeley, Ned Pratt and Peter Wilkins.

As of 2011, a study documented approximately 1,200 artists, representing 0.47% of the province's labour force.

=== Music ===
Newfoundland and Labrador has a folk musical heritage based on the Irish, English and Scottish traditions that were brought to its shores centuries ago. Though similar in its Celtic influence to neighbouring Nova Scotia and Prince Edward Island, Newfoundland and Labrador are more Irish than Scottish, and have more elements imported from English and French music than those provinces. Newfoundland, in its relatively isolated fishing outposts, has been as a storehouse of pre-famine Irish music, and of the house-session tradition (suppressed in the home country by the 1935 Public Dance Hall Act). Much of the region's music focuses on the strong seafaring tradition in the area, and includes sea shanties and other sailing songs. Some modern traditional musicians include Great Big Sea, The Ennis Sisters, The Dardanelles, Ron Hynes and Jim Payne.

The Newfoundland Symphony Orchestra began in St. John's in 1962 as a 20-piece string orchestra known as the St. John's Orchestra. A school of music at Memorial University schedules a variety of concerts and has a chamber orchestra and jazz band. Two members of its faculty, Nancy Dahn on violin and Timothy Steeves on piano, perform as Duo Concertante and are responsible for establishing an annual music festival in August, the Tuckamore Festival. Both the school of music and Opera on the Avalon produce operatic works. A leading institution for research in ethnomusicology, Memorial's Research Centre for the Study of Music, Media, and Place, offers academic lectures, scholarly residencies, conferences, symposia, and outreach activities to the province on music and culture.

The pre-confederation and current provincial anthem is the "Ode to Newfoundland", written by British colonial governor Sir Charles Cavendish Boyle in 1902. It was adopted as the official Newfoundland anthem on May 20, 1904. In 1980, the province re-adopted the song as an official provincial anthem. "The Ode to Newfoundland" is still sung at public events in Newfoundland and Labrador.

=== Literature ===
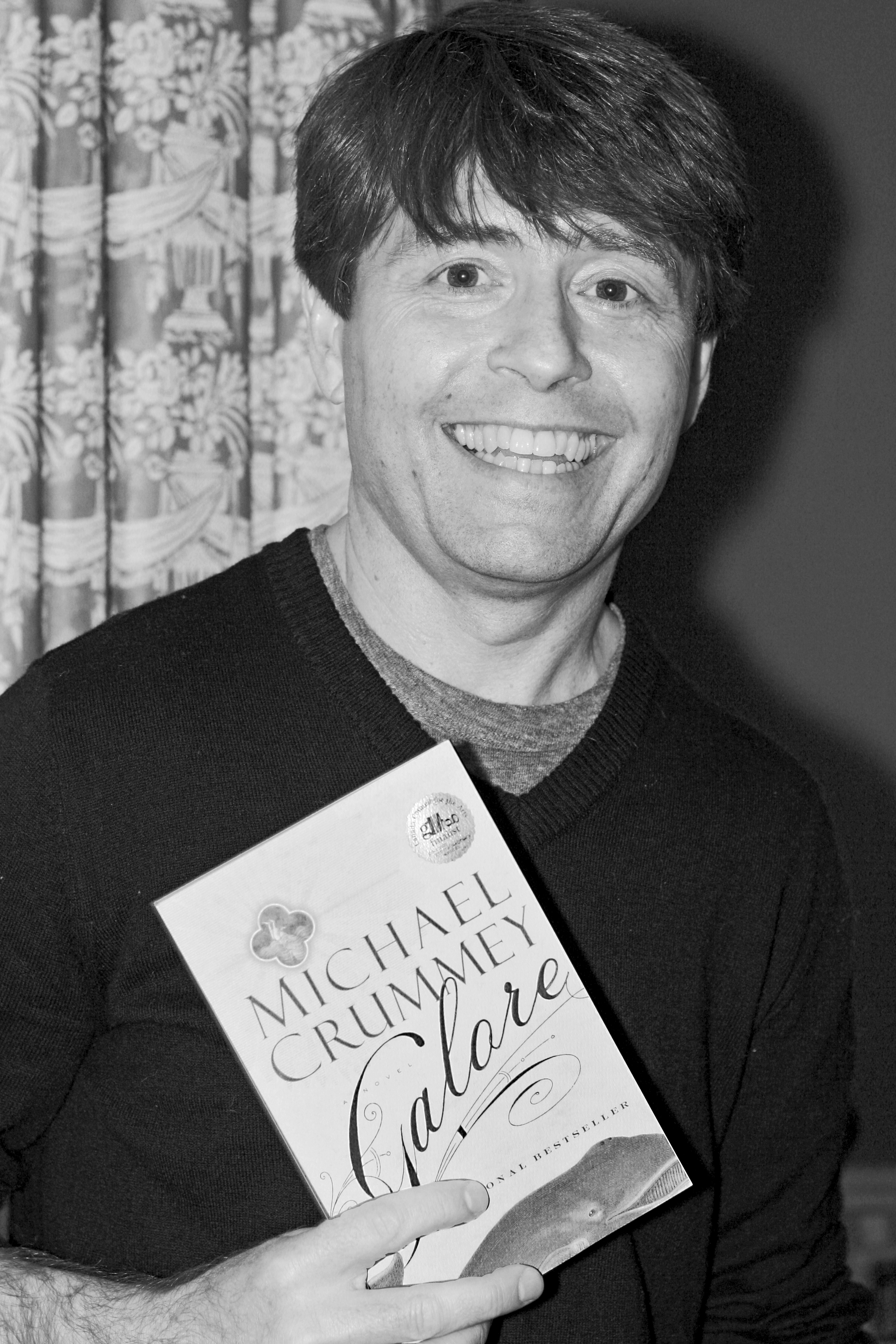
Michael Crummey is a contemporary novelist from Newfoundland and Labrador.

Margaret Duley (1894–1968) was Newfoundland's first novelist to gain an international audience. Her works include The Eyes of the Gull (1936), Cold Pastoral (1939) and Highway to Valour (1941). Other writers who wrote major works in the 20th century include Harold Horwood, author of Tomorrow Will Be Sunday (1966) and White Eskimo (1972); Percy Janes, author of House of Hate (1970); M. T. Dohaney, author of The Corrigan Women (1988); and Bernice Morgan, author of Random Passage (1992).

In the late 20th and early 21st century, a new generation of writers came to prominence. Michael Crummey's novel, River Thieves (2001), was a Canadian bestseller and his 2023 novel The Adversary won the International Dublin Literary Award. Wayne Johnston's fiction deals primarily with the province of Newfoundland and Labrador, often in a historical setting. Lisa Moore's first novel, Alligator (2005), is set in St. John's and incorporates her Newfoundland heritage. Others include Joel Thomas Hynes, author of We'll All Be Burnt in Our Beds Some Night (2017); Jessica Grant, author of Come Thou Tortoise (2009); Kenneth J. Harvey, author of The Town That Forgot How to Breathe (2003) and Blackstrap Hawco (2008); and Megan Gail Coles, author of Small Game Hunting at the Local Coward Gun Club (2019).

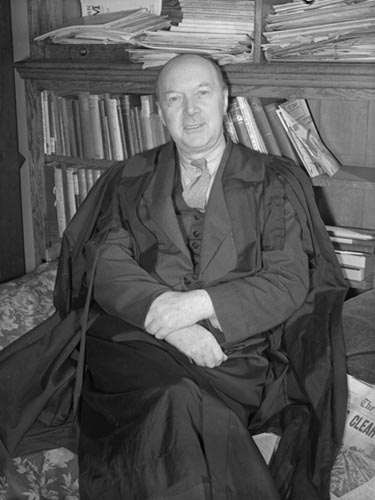
E. J. Pratt wrote a number of poems describing maritime life and the history of Canada.

The earliest works of poetry in British North America, mainly written by visitors and targeted at a European audience, described the new territories in optimistic terms. One of the first works was Robert Hayman's Quodlibets, a collection of verses composed in Newfoundland and published in 1628.

In the oral tradition of County Waterford, the Munster Irish poet Donnchadh Ruadh Mac Conmara, a former hedge school teacher, is said to have sailed for Newfoundland around 1743, allegedly to escape the wrath of a man whose daughter the poet had impregnated. During the 21st century, however, linguists discovered that several of Donnchadh Ruadh's poems in the Irish language contain multiple Gaelicized words and terms known to be unique to Newfoundland English. For this reason, Donnchadh Ruadh's poems are considered the earliest literature in the Irish language in Newfoundland.

After the Second World War, Newfoundland poet E. J. Pratt described the struggle to make a living from the sea in poems about maritime life and the history of Canada, including in his 1923 "breakthrough collection" Newfoundland Verse. Amongst more recent poets are Tom Dawe, Al Pittman, Mary Dalton, Agnes Walsh, Patrick Warner and John Steffler. Canadian poet Don McKay has resided in St. John's in recent years.

In 1967 the St. John's Arts and Culture Centre was opened along with the first all-Canadian Dominion Drama Festival:

Playwrights across Canada began writing, and this explosion was also felt in Newfoundland and Labrador. Subregional festivals saw Newfoundland plays compete—Wreakers by Cassie Brown, Tomorrow Will Be Sunday by Tom Cahill, and Holdin' Ground by Ted Russell. Cahill's play went on to receive top honours and a performance at Expo 67 in Montreal. Joining Brown and Cahill in the seventies were Michael Cook and Al Pittman, both prolific writers.

=== Performing arts ===
Modern theatre companies include the New Curtain Theatre Company in Clarenville and the New World Theatre Project in Cupids. Shakespeare by the Sea presents outdoor productions of the plays of William Shakespeare, as well as pieces related to the province and culture.

Dance in Newfoundland and Labrador comprises dances that are specific to the province, including performance and traditional, and Indigenous dance. The Kittiwake Dance Theatre, founded in 1987, is the oldest non-profit dance company in Newfoundland.

=== Other ===
George Street in St. John's is the location of an annual Mardi Gras celebration in October, but the largest celebration held there is the six-night George Street Festival in early August. The festival is rumoured to be the largest of its kind in North America with over 120,000 people making their way through the two block street during the six-day period.

=== Symbols ===
Provincial symbols
| Official flower | Pitcher plant |
| Official tree | Black spruce |
| Official bird | Atlantic puffin |
| Official horse | Newfoundland pony |
| Official animal | Caribou |
| Official game bird | Ptarmigan |
| Official mineral | Labradorite |
| Official dogs | Newfoundland Dog and Labrador Retriever |
| Provincial anthem | "Ode to Newfoundland" |
| Provincial holiday | June 24 Discovery Day |
| Patron saint | John the Baptist |
| Official tartan | |
| Great seal | |
| Coat of arms | |
| Escutcheon | |

The Newfoundland Tricolour is an unofficial flag used by a number of Newfoundlanders.

The unofficial Flag of Labrador, used by a number of Labradorians

Newfoundland and Labrador's present provincial flag, designed by Newfoundland artist Christopher Pratt, was officially adopted by the legislature on May 28, 1980, and first flown on "Discovery Day" that year. The blue is meant to represent the sea, the white represents snow and ice, the red represents the efforts and struggles of the people, and the gold represents the confidence of Newfoundlanders and Labradorians. The blue triangles are a tribute to the Union Flag, and represent the British heritage of the province. The two red triangles represent Labrador (the mainland portion of the province) and the island. In Pratt's words, the golden arrow points towards a "brighter future".

What has commonly but mistakenly been called the Newfoundland tricolour "Pink, White and Green"(sic) is the flag of the Catholic Church affiliated Star of the Sea Association (SOSA). It originated in the late nineteenth century and enjoyed popularity among people who were under the impression that it was the Native Flag of Newfoundland which was created before 1852 by the Newfoundland Natives' Society. The true Native Flag (red-white-green tricolour) was widely flown into the late nineteenth century. Neither tricolour was ever adopted by the Newfoundland government. The "Pink, White and Green"(sic) has been adopted by some residents as a symbol of ties with Irish heritage and as a political statement. Many of the province's Protestants, who make up nearly 60% of the province's total population, may not identify with this heritage. At the same time, many of the province's Catholics, approximately 37% of the total population (with at least 22% of the population claiming Irish ancestry), think the current provincial flag does not satisfactorily represent them. But, a government-sponsored poll in 2005 revealed that 75% of Newfoundlanders rejected adoption of the Tricolour flag as the province's official flag.

Labrador has its own unofficial flag, created in 1973 by Mike Martin, former Member of the Legislative Assembly for Labrador South.

On Newfoundland, as of 2024 moose have become an increasingly adopted symbol of the island.

== Sports ==
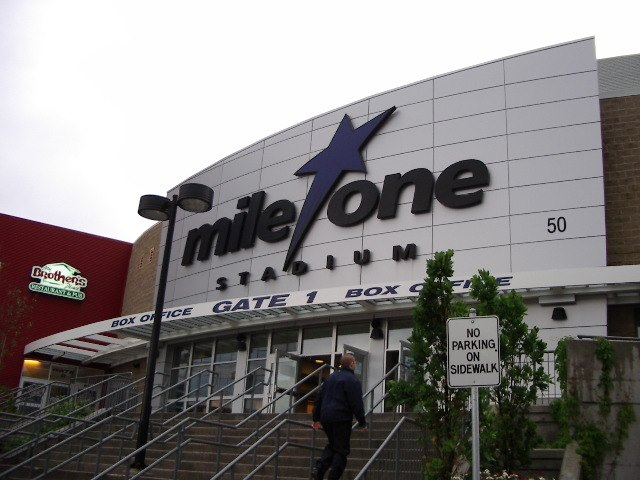
Mary Brown's Centre (formerly Mile One Centre) is an indoor arena in St. John's.

Newfoundland and Labrador has a somewhat different sports culture from the rest of Canada, owing in part to its long history separate from the rest of Canada and under British rule. Ice hockey, however, remains popular. St. John's is home to the Newfoundland Regiment of the QMJHL, who launched in 2025 and play their home games at Mary Brown's Centre.

St. John's had previously been home to multiple now-defunct minor league hockey teams, including the St. John's Maple Leafs, St. John's IceCaps, St. John's Fog Devils, and Newfoundland Growlers.

The Newfoundland Senior Hockey League organized teams around the island during its existence.

Hurling and other Gaelic games have a very long history in the Province and continue to be played.

Association football (soccer) and rugby union are both more popular in Newfoundland and Labrador than the rest of Canada in general. Soccer is hosted at King George V Park, a 6,000-seat stadium built as Newfoundland's national stadium during the time as an independent dominion. Swilers Rugby Park is home of the Swilers RFC rugby union club, as well as the Atlantic Rock, one of the four regional teams in the Canadian Rugby Championship. Other sports facilities in Newfoundland and Labrador include Pepsi Centre, an indoor arena in Corner Brook; and St. Patrick's Park, a baseball park in St. John's.

Gridiron football, be it either American or Canadian, is almost non-existent; it is the only Canadian province other than Prince Edward Island to have never hosted a Canadian Football League or Canadian Interuniversity Sport game, and it was not until 2013 the province saw its first amateur teams form.

Cricket was once a popular sport. The earliest mention is in the Newfoundland Mercantile Journal, Thursday September 16, 1824, indicating the St. John's Cricket Club was an established club at this time. The St. John's Cricket club was one of the first cricket clubs in North America. Other centres were at Harbour Grace, Twillingate and Trinity. The heyday of the game was the late nineteenth and early twentieth century, at which time there was league in St. John's, as well as an interschool tournament. John Shannon Munn is Newfoundland's most famous cricketer, having represented Oxford University. After the first World War, cricket declined in popularity and was replaced by soccer and baseball. However, with the arrival of immigrants from the Indian subcontinent, cricket is once again gaining interest in the province.

In 2024, Newfoundland and Labrador became the shirt sponsors of Barrow A.F.C., an association football (soccer) team located in North West England.

== Transportation ==
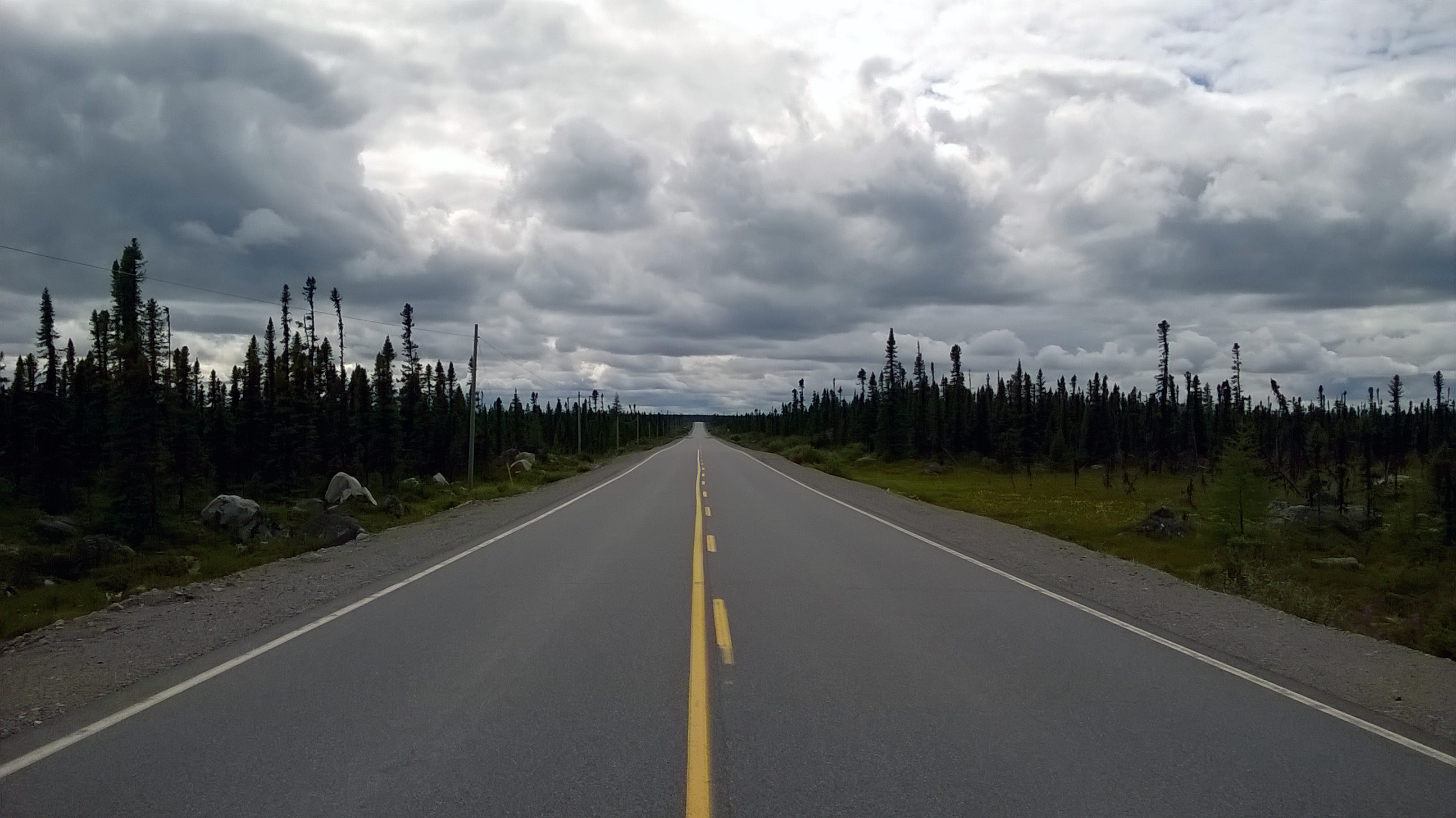
The Trans-Labrador Highway is the primary highway for Labrador.

=== Ferries ===
Within the province, the Newfoundland and Labrador Department of Transportation and Works operates or sponsors 15 automobile, passenger and freight ferry routes which connect various communities along the province's significant coastline.

A regular passenger and car ferry service, lasting about 90 minutes, crosses the Strait of Belle Isle, connecting the province's island of Newfoundland with the region of Labrador on the mainland. The ferry Qajaq W travels from St. Barbe, Newfoundland, on the Great Northern Peninsula, to the port town of Blanc-Sablon, Quebec, located on the provincial border and beside the town of L'Anse-au-Clair, Labrador. The MV Sir Robert Bond once provided seasonal ferry service between Lewisporte on the island and the towns of Cartwright and Happy Valley-Goose Bay in Labrador, but has not run since the completion of the Trans-Labrador Highway in 2010, allowing access from Blanc-Sablon, Quebec, to major parts of Labrador. Several smaller ferries connect numerous other coastal towns and offshore island communities around the island of Newfoundland and up the Labrador coast as far north as Nain. There are also two ferries, MV Legionnaire and MV Flanders, that operate between Bell Island and Portugal Cove–St. Philips yearly, mainly used by those commuting to St. John's for work. The MV Veteran, a sister ship of MV Legionnaire, operates between Fogo Island, Change Islands, and Farewell.

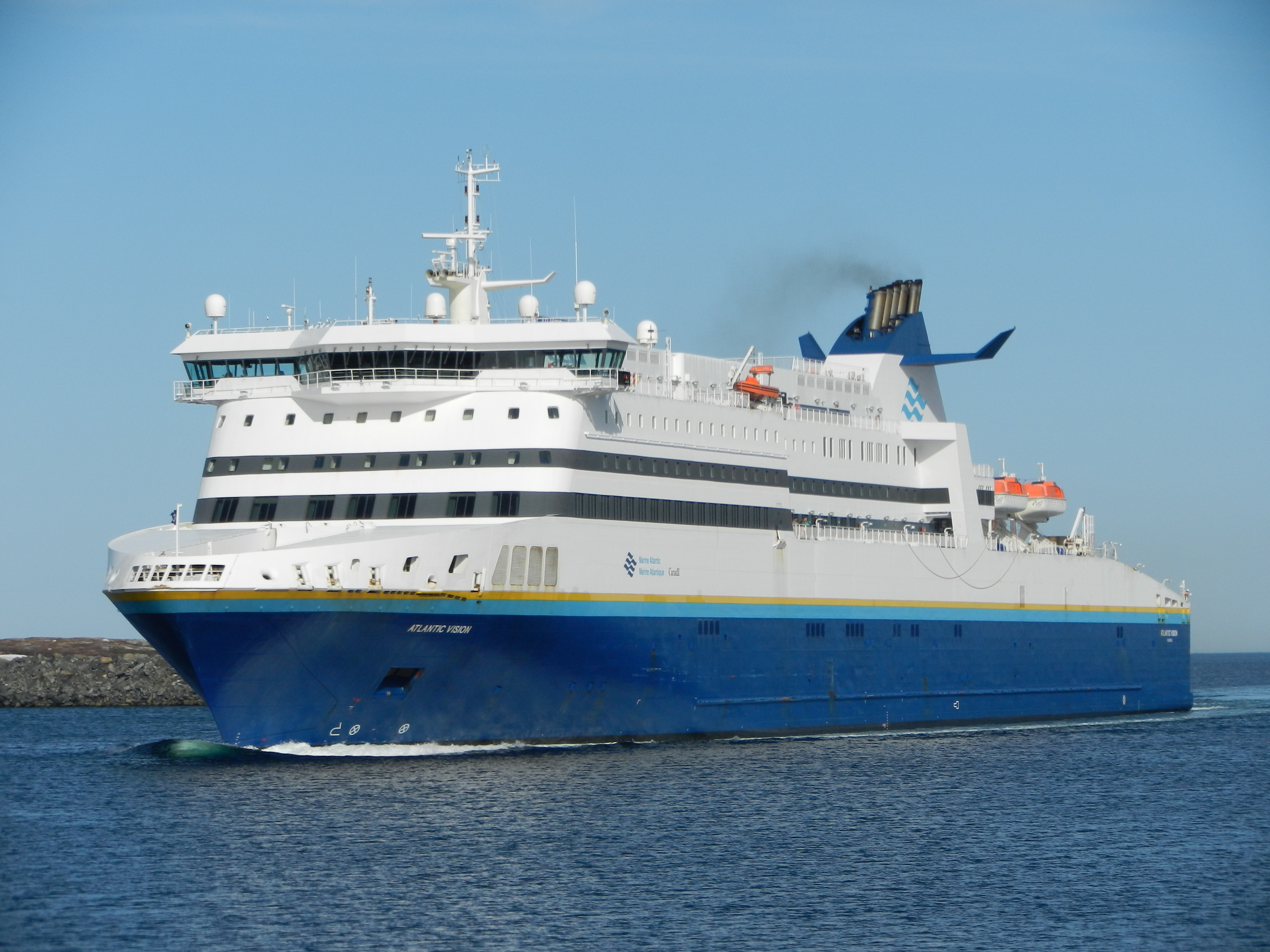
MV Atlantic Vision is one of several ships that provides inter-provincial ferry service to Newfoundland.

Inter-provincial ferry services are provided by Marine Atlantic, a federal Crown corporation which operates auto-passenger ferries from North Sydney, Nova Scotia, to the towns of Port aux Basques and Argentia on the southern coast of Newfoundland island.

=== Aviation ===
The St. John's International Airport (YYT) and the Gander International Airport (YQX) are the only airports in the province that are part of the National Airports System. The St. John's International Airport handles nearly 1.2 million passengers a year making it the busiest airport in the province and the fourteenth busiest airport in Canada. YYT airport underwent a major expansion of the terminal building which was completed in 2021. The Deer Lake Airport (YDF) handles over 300,000 passengers a year.

=== Railway ===
The Newfoundland Railway operated on the island of Newfoundland from 1898 to 1988. With a total track length of 1,458 km (906 mi), it was the longest 3 ft 6 in (1,067 mm) narrow-gauge railway system in North America. The railway ended on June 20, 1988, in the rails for roads deal.

Tshiuetin Rail Transportation operates passenger rail service on its Sept-Îles, Quebec, to Schefferville, Quebec route, passing through Labrador and stopping in several towns.

== See also ==
- Index of Newfoundland and Labrador–related articles
