= Louise Moyes =

Canadian dancer and choreographer

- Born: April 3, 1965 (age 60); St. John's, Newfoundland and Labrador
- Education: Memorial University (French Literature and Medicine), Studio 303, Montreal (Dance)
- Occupations: Dance artist, choreographer
- Website: docudance.com

Louise Moyes is a Canadian dancer and choreographer based in St. John's, Newfoundland and Labrador. Moyes is known for what she calls docu-dances, multi-disciplinary theatrical shows she creates by working with the rhythms of voices and accents as if they were a musical score. Moyes has performed across Canada and in Germany, Italy, Iceland, New York, Australia and Brazil.

== Performance work ==
Docu-dance works include ‘Moore-Gallant: a docudance’, staged short stories by Lisa Moore and Mavis Gallant; ‘St. John’s Women’; ‘Florence’; ‘Taking in Strangers’; and ‘unravelling the borders.’

== Film work ==
Moyes often directs film footage to use in her live performances. In 2019, she produced and appeared in the short film, On Hold. The film was shown at the Dance: Made in Canada Festival in Toronto and at the St. John's International Women's Film Festival.

== Awards ==
In 2014, Moyes received a Manning Heritage Award for her dramatic presentation of francophone history in Newfoundland.

In 2016, Moyes received the Canada Council for the Arts' Victor Martyn Lynch-Staunton Award (for Innovation in Dance by a mid-career artist).
