= João Fernandes Lavrador =

Portuguese explorer

- Pronunciation: ʒuˈɐ̃w fɨɾˈnɐ̃dɨʒ lɐvɾɐˈðoɾ
- Born: Kingdom of Portugal
- Occupations: Explorer, navigator
- Years active: 1486–1501
- Known for: Explorer of the coasts of northeast North America.

João Fernandes "Lavrador" (fl. 1486–1501) was a Portuguese explorer of the late 15th century. He was one of the first modern explorers of the northeast coasts of North America. The name Labrador was first applied to Greenland based on his early sighting of the island. The name was later moved to the Labrador peninsula in present-day Canada.

== Name ==
João Fernandes has been referred to as João Fernandes Lavrador or simply "the Lavrador", where Lavrador is a nickname, a title, or a reference to his profession. Writers have translated the Portuguese word as landowner, or farmer.

== Expeditions ==
Fernandes was from Terceira in the Azores archipelago. Almost nothing is known about his earlier life. Customs records suggest that he was a merchant trading in sugar and cloth between Bristol and Lisbon as early as 1486. His voyages to the North Atlantic in the 1490s are poorly documented and somewhat confusing. Much of the record of his travels comes from the interpretation of old maps which can be unreliable or inconsistent.

In the mid-1490s Fernandes may have undertaken a voyage with fellow Azorean, Pero de Barcelos, into the northwest Atlantic. They traveled as far as Greenland and perhaps sailed across the Labrador Sea and coasted south along the shore of North America. The timing of this voyage in unclear but in 1506 Barcelos testified in an unrelated lawsuit that he and João Fernandes spent three years to "go discovering" as authorized by the king.

Fernandes was granted a license by King Manuel I on October 28, 1499 to "seek out and discover at his own expense some islands in our [Portugal's] sphere of influence [as set out in the Treaty of Tordesillas]." Authorities have debated whether Fernandes had already made discoveries and was just seeking assurance that his claims would be upheld. His next steps are unclear; he may have made another voyage to North America in 1500 but there are no records of it.

However, by the end of 1500, the lavrador was in Bristol along with two other Azorean colleagues. Together with three men from Bristol, they formed an association that successfully petitioned King Henry VII for permission to discover, occupy and exploit "any town, city, castle, island or mainland... newly found [by them]." It has been assumed that at least some members of the Anglo-Azorean group made a voyage in 1501 but, again, there is no proof. Something happened however, because in 1502, Henry VII updated the syndicate's charter and specifically excluded Fernandes from participating in the Anglo-Azorean association. He may have died on their latest expedition or there may have been some sort of rift within the syndicate. In any case, what happened to Fernandes after 1501 is unknown.

== Naming Labrador ==
João Fernandes "Lavrador" is thought to be the source of the geographic name Labrador. Various early sixteenth century maps showed the name applied to Greenland and not the North American mainland. The Hamy-King map shows Greenland as "Terra de Labrador" implying that Greenland had been discovered by the labrador, João Fernandes. The Weimar map of 1530 shows a legend near Greenland: "This land was discovered by the English of the town of Bristol... And as the one who first gave notice of it was a Labrador of the Azores, they gave it the name." Other maps of the era also noted that the island was named after a Labrador from the Azores who either discovered it or gave notice of it. It was not until the 1570s that cartographers restored the original Norse name to Greenland and moved the name Labrador to the North American mainland.

== Sources ==
- Biggar, Henry Percival (1911). The precursors of Jacques Cartier, 1497-1534. Ottowa: Government Printing Office.
- Davies, A. (1979) [1966]. "Fernandes, João". In Brown, George Williams (ed.). Dictionary of Canadian Biography. Vol. I (1000–1700) (online ed.). University of Toronto Press.
- Diffie, Bailey W.; Winius, George D. (1977). Foundations of the Portuguese empire, 1415-1580. Europe and the world in the Age of Expansion. Minneapolis: University of Minnesota Press. ISBN 978-0-8166-0782-2.
- Howgego, Raymond John, ed. (2003). "Fernandes, João". Encyclopedia of Exploration to 1800. Hordern House. ISBN 1875567364.
- Jost, T. (1967). Voyages of Discovery: Hugh Say Alias John Day The Men of Bristol and Joao Fernandes. Cartographica: The International Journal for Geographic Information and Geovisualization, 4(1), 01-12.
- Major, Kevin (2002). As near to heaven by sea : a history of Newfoundland and Labrador. Penguin Canada. ISBN 0140278648.
- Morison, Samuel Eliot (1971). The European Discovery of America, the Northern Voyages. Oxford University Press. ISBN 0-19-501377-8.
- Seaver, Kirsten A. (2000). The frozen echo: Greenland and the exploration of North America, c. A.D. 1000–1500. Stanford, Calif.: Stanford Univ. Press. ISBN 978-0-8047-3161-4.
