= Judy Knee =

Canadian dancer (born 1953)

- Born: 1953 (age 71–72); St. John's, Newfoundland and Labrador, Canada
- Occupation(s): Dancer, educator
- Career
- Current group: Judy Knee Dance Studio

Judy Knee (born 1953) is a Canadian dancer and educator known for her work as a dance teacher and founder of the Judy Knee Dance studio. She has been based for most of her career in St. John's, Newfoundland and Labrador.

== Early life and education ==
Born in St. John's, Newfoundland and Labrador in 1953, Knee was schooled at St. Michael's., Samson, and Bishops College. She started dancing at five. Her first lessons were in tap at the Judy Fagan school. She then continued to study locally with Phyllis Angel, learning jazz dance, in addition to ballet and tap. At fifteen, she started folkloric dance instruction. She and fellow students from Angel's school danced for the CBC show “All Around the Circle”. They were called the Angel Dancers. Then she became involved with a group of dancers, called the Steppin Time Dancers, doing Newfoundland jigs and reels.

== Career ==
She started training dancers at the Judy Knee School of Dance in 1993. The School became known as the Judy Knee Dance College in September 1997. Knee taught at the Phyllis Angel School for three years, then at eighteen went to England and spent three years there, studying dance. She then returned home and after a year opened her own school in 1976, located at 77 Bond Street, teaching ballet, ballroom, jazz, tap, and disco, among other forms. In 1981, she moved to a different location at 27 Mayor Ave. At first, about 50-80 students were enrolled, and she taught all the classes herself. She introduced a teacher-training program in 1993.

She opened the Judy Knee Dance Studio in St. John's in 1975, and in 2018 put the studio up for sale.

== Awards ==
Knee received the Ballroom Faculty Scholarship awarded by the Imperial Society of Teachers of Dancing, England.
