= Art of Newfoundland and Labrador =

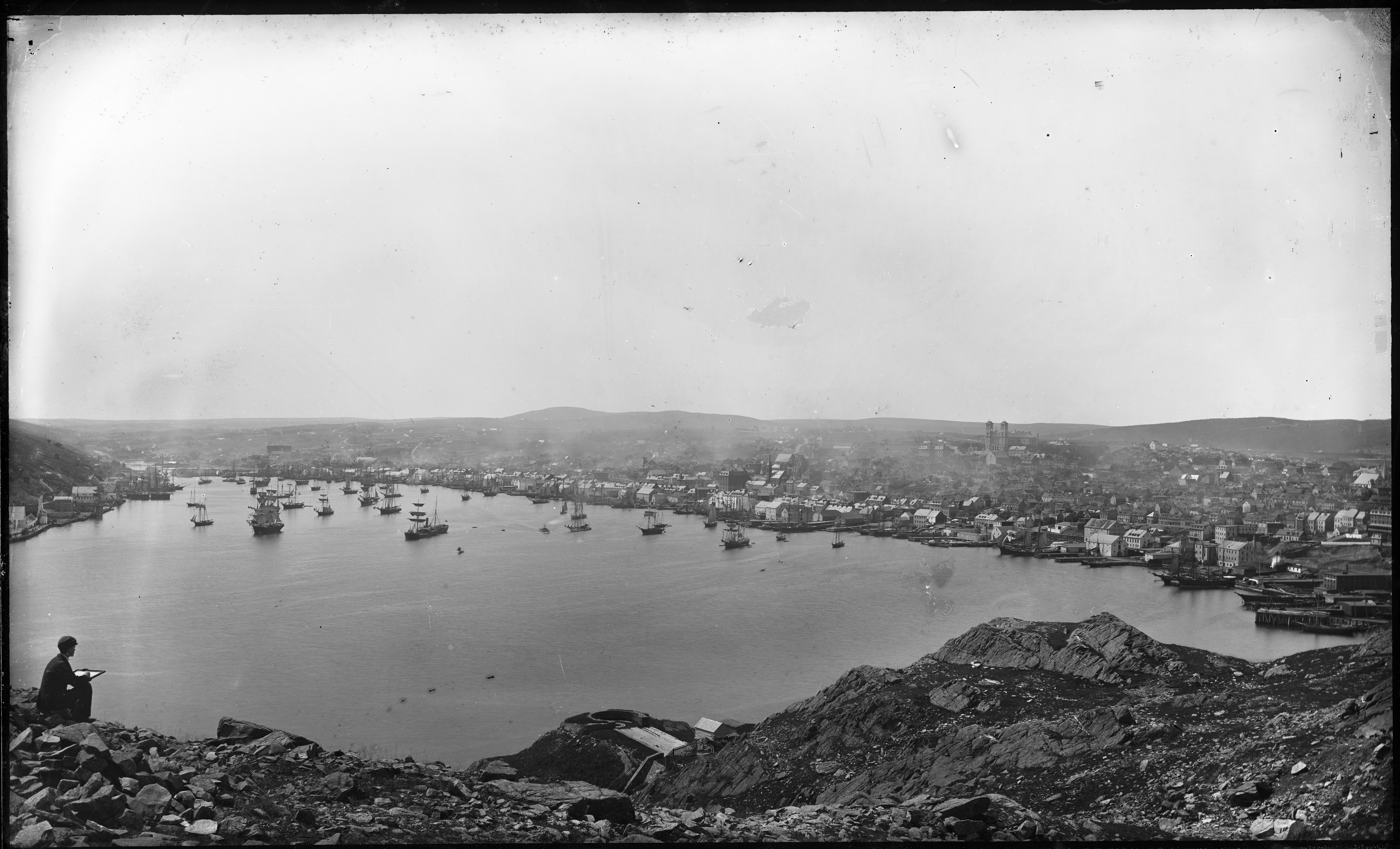
Artist sketching the St. John's Harbour and skyline (c. 1890), photograph by S.H. Parsons & Sons (St. John's, N.L.)

The art of Newfoundland and Labrador has followed a unique artistic trajectory when compared to mainland Canada, due to the geographic seclusion and socio-economic history of the province. Labradorian art possesses its own historical lineage.

While the history of craft and folk art in Newfoundland and Labrador is extensive, fine arts practices have developed primarily since 1949, when the province joined Canada. Prior to Confederation, the majority of fine art was created by visiting and itinerant artists. Newfoundland and Labradorian art developed significantly after joining Canada, with the introduction of government initiatives. Since the 1960s in particular, waves of artists have established practices on the island, many with strong roots in the province. Others have been introduced by professional opportunities, residency programs, art education programs, and galleries. An established community of artists is now widely recognized, and creates work in a variety of media.

== Art in Labrador ==
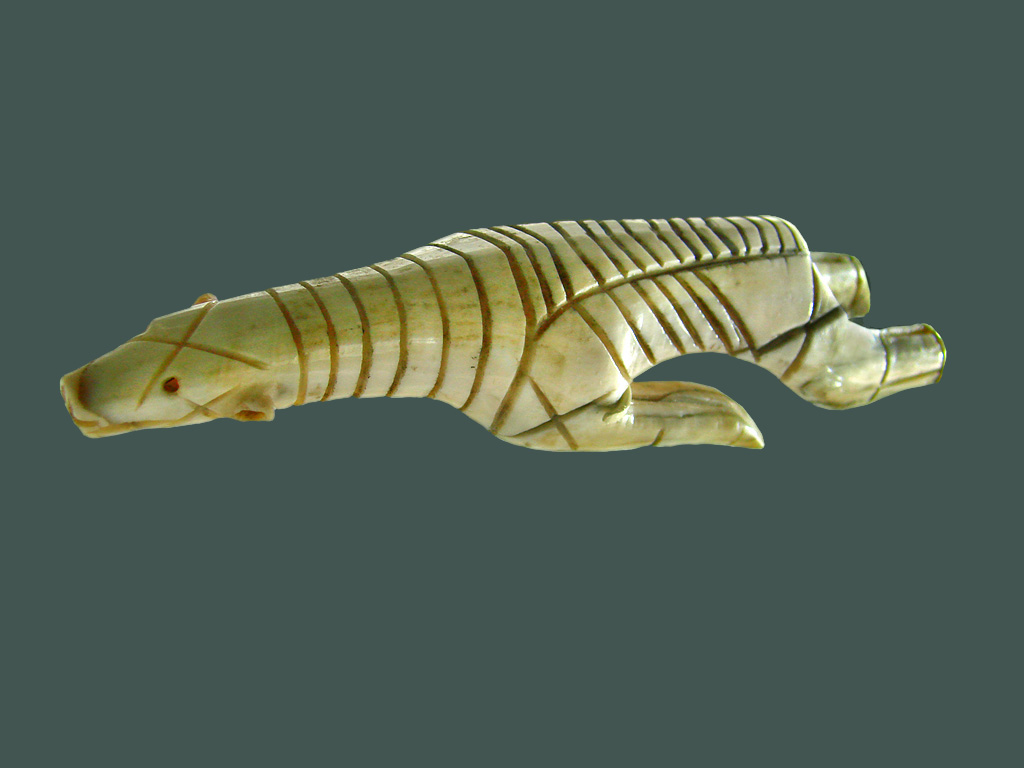
Artifact from Dorset Culture (Collection: Musée du quai Branly)

Labradorian art has its roots in both the aboriginal cultures and the European contact period of the eighteenth and nineteenth centuries. The earliest examples of art in the province were produced by aboriginal peoples, with the oldest known object identified with the Dorset Culture, created around 800 A.D.

During two centuries of European trader and missionary contact with the Inuit, Innu and Settlers of Labrador, there was minor trade in available carvings and crafts. Moravian missionaries arrived in northern Labrador in the 1700s, and Grenfell's medical mission traveled in the 1800s to southern Labrador and northern Newfoundland. Mission workers helped create a local handicraft industry that allowed residents to sell hooked mats, knitted goods and other items at North American retail shops. Today, early Grenfell rugs are considered works of art, and many dating from the late 1800s and early 1900s are held in museum collections throughout North America.

During the 1970s, contemporary visual arts began to flourish. This trend was bolstered by government initiatives, the introduction of technologies and transportation, and a shift in attitude toward northern and aboriginal art as cultural and artistic collector items. In Labrador, this began with a Provincial Government rural development initiative called Labrador Craft Producers Association (LCPA), which was headed by Garfield Warren. Nain was also visited around this time by visual artist Bill Ritchie, who encouraged sculpture and printmaking among Labrador's Inuit artists and initiated a collective for the development and sale of visual arts by artists like Gilbert Hay and John Terriak. The Labrador Inuit Association continued Ritchie's work for approximately a decade, with marketing and promotion of north coast Inuit art. Arts and crafts as an industry were developed by the LCPA throughout the rest of Labrador until the initiative dismantled in 1993. Prior to its demise, the LCPA mounted a major exhibition and video project entitled "Visions of Labrador," which took place in 1991.

The Labrador Arts and Culture Centre opened in 1986, and aided the growth of visual arts in western Labrador. Individual artists and artists' collectives in the Straits, Lake Melville and Labrador West began to develop, market and promote themselves in the visual arts. Labrador Handicrafts Inc. and The Birches Gallery stepped in to fill the void left by government and aboriginal associations. In Goose Bay, The Birches Gallery mounted a series of exhibitions and promotional events, in Labrador and several sites throughout North America, from 1994 to 2004. This, combined with a new initiative in Labrador of the St. John's-based Newfoundland and Labrador Craft Council's Labrador Craft Marketing Agency in 1996, provided new impetus for a strong arts and crafts industry. A Visual Arts Association has continued in Western Labrador for more than 20 years, headed by artists such as Joyce Channing, Sheilagh Harvey, Margorie O'Brien, and Ed Owen.

Today, a strong community of visual arts and artists work in Labrador, basing their work in a variety of media. Notable Labradorian artists include Boyd Chubbs, Robin Smith Peck, Michael Massie, Billy Gauthier, Gilbert Hay, John Terriak, William Lucy, George Flowers, Derrick Pottle, George Collins, David Terriak, Georgina Broomfield, Emily Flowers, John Neville, Madeline Michelin, Barry Pardy, Garmel Rich, and Shannon Simms.

In 2016, the first exhibition of art by Labrador Inuit was held at The Rooms Provincial Art Gallery. Titled "SakKijâjuk: Inuit Fine Art and Craft from Nunatsiavut," the exhibition described the history of post-Confederation artistic production in Nunatsiavut, including artists such as Josephina Kalleo.

== Art in Newfoundland ==
=== Beothuk art ===
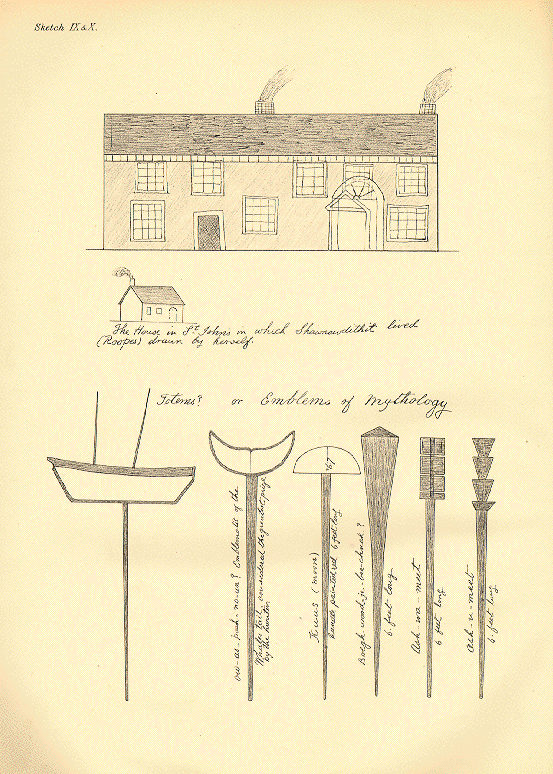
"Emblems of Red Indian Mythology" (sketch IX) by Shanawdithit

Beothuk were the indigenous inhabitants of Newfoundland from AD 1500 onward, now believed to be largely extinct due to a contraction in their territories following contact with Europeans. Little documentation exists about their cultural practices. Many Beothuk artifacts were discovered in grave sites during the late 19th and early 20th centuries, and include carved bone, antler and ivory pendants intricately decorated with incised patterns. Another notable feature of Beothuk culture was the use of powdered hematite, or red ochre, which they used to paint their canoes and other artifacts, and their bodies.

In 1829, ten drawings were obtained by Mr W. E. Cormack during the winter of 1829 from the last known full-blooded Beothuk, Shanawdithit, while she resided in his St. John's house. They present articles of food, utensils, implements and emblems used by the Beothuk, as well as scenes enacted on or near the Exploits River and Beothuk Lake between the years 1810 and 1823. "Although rude and truly Indian in character," James P. Howley wrote in 1915 (judging them by European aesthetic standards), "they nevertheless display no small amount of artistic skill, and there is an extraordinary minuteness of topographical detail in those having reference to the Exploits River and adjacent country. These latter bear a striking resemblance to Micmac sketches of a similar character, such as I have frequently seen and made use of, when accompanied by Micmac canoemen on the Geological Survey of the Island. There is one notable omission in either, i.e., the entire absence of anything like a regular scale. As a rule, rivers and lakes are greatly exaggerated, and particular features, which may in nature be situated widely apart, are frequently crowded into a very small space; the reverse being just as frequently the case."

=== Pre-Confederation: "Outsiders and Amateurs" ===
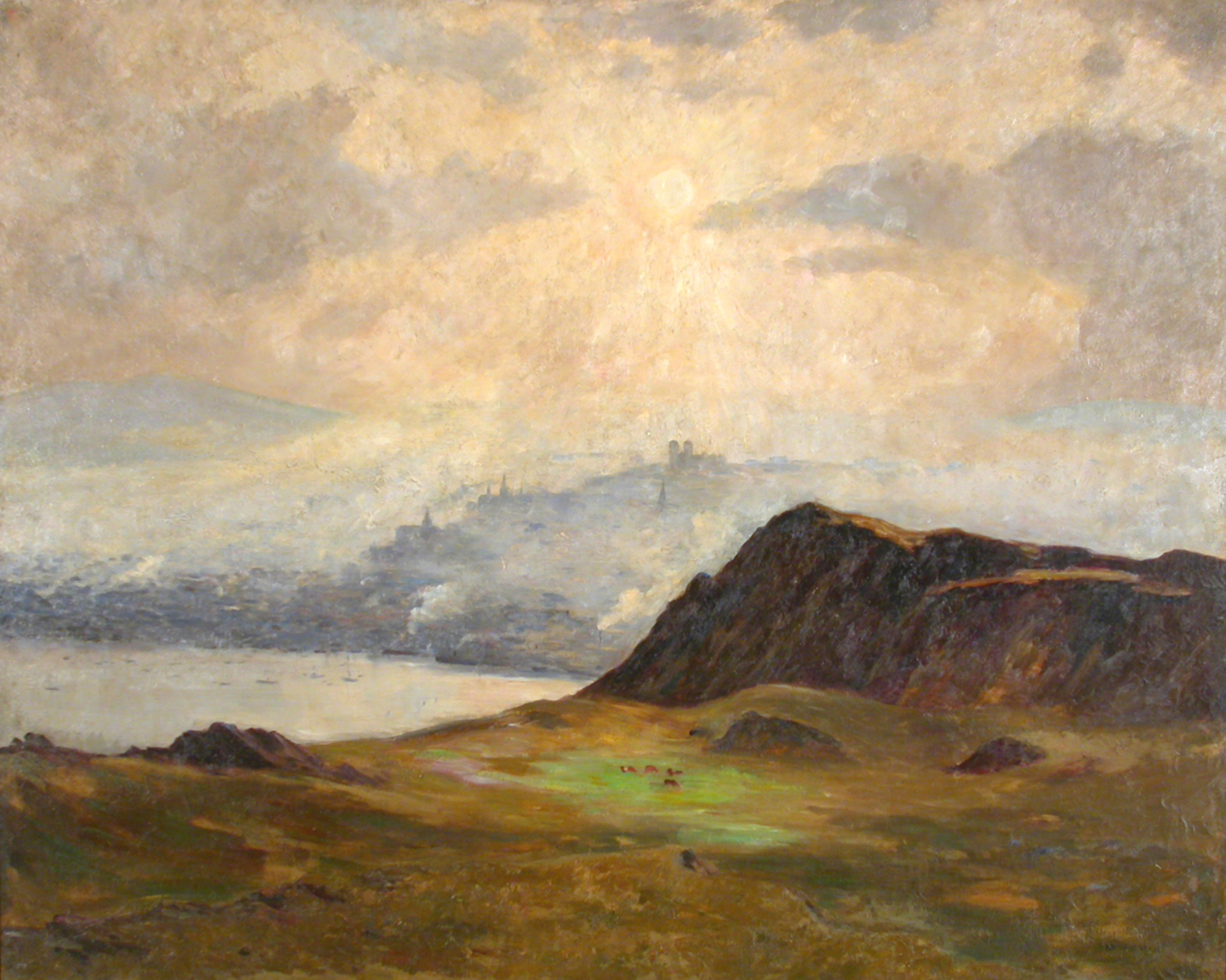
Maurice Cullen. "A Misty Afternoon, St. John's, Newfoundland." (1910), oil on canvas. 122.5 cm x 153.25. The Rooms Provincial Art Gallery Collection, Gift of the National Art Gallery of Canada

Until about 1900, most art was the work of visiting and itinerant artists. The first known image of the Newfoundland landscape is alleged to have been produced by the itinerant artist Gerard Edema in the 17th century, known for "painting landscapes, in which he exhibited a variety of scenes of horror, such as rocks, mountains, precipices, cataracts, and other marks of savage nature." Topographic drawings and watercolours by naval and military officers were the prevalent art form until the late 18th century. Artists such as William Eagar attempted to teach picturesque painting while in Newfoundland, but his efforts to promote the "new" branch of art were met with very little interest. In 1902, the artist J.W. Nichols composed an instructional article for the public in the Newfoundland Quarterly on "Recreative Art," which provided guidelines for amateurs wishing to explore Nature by painting its beauty. Newfoundland-born artists such as Maurice Cullen and Robert Pilot traveled to Europe to study art with prominent ateliers.

The early 20th century brought visiting artists such as Rockwell Kent, and Eliot O'Hara to Newfoundland. Members of the Group of Seven came to the island on numerous occasions, drawn to its rocky landscape and northern topography. A.Y. Jackson, Arthur Lismer, and Lawren Harris created a number of works during their visits, primarily landscape and rural scenes. F.H. Varley would provide woodcut landscape illustrations for the first commercial release of Newfoundland poet E. J. Pratt, titled "Newfoundland Verse" (1923). Other notable artists in the 1930s include Rhoda Dawson, who arrived in 1930 to be a design instructor with the Grenfell Mission until 1933, returning in 1934 from England to teach at Payne's Cove. Additionally, George Campbell Tinning visited Newfoundland as a war artist during the Second World War, returning to paint in 1949.

Local amateur art societies became prominent in the 1940s, particularly The Art Students Club, which opened in 1940. Organized by Muriel (Mrs. A.C.) Hunter, with Harold Goodridge as president, the club grew to 40 active members and 100 associates over 10 years, and featured work of artists from overseas and from Newfoundland. With no official gallery space, exhibitions were held in various locations. Although none were formally trained, notable artists included J.W. Hayward and his son Thomas B. Hayward; Agnes Marian Ayre; and Harold B. Goodridge (who worked on a number of mural commissions, including one for the lobby of the Confederation Building in St. John's).

In 1949, Robert Ayre, then editor of Canadian Art, described Newfoundland's artistic environment as one left largely to "outsiders and amateurs" due to its geographic isolation and small population.

=== After Confederation: A Cultural Renaissance ===
After Newfoundland and Labrador joined Canada in 1949, government grants fostered a supportive environment for visual artists. The visual arts of the province developed significantly in the second half of the century, with the return of young Newfoundland artists who had studied abroad. Among the first were Rae Perlin, who studied at the Art Students League in New York, and Reginald Shepherd and Helen Parsons Shepherd, who both graduated from the Ontario College of Art. The Shepherds would establish the province's first art school, the Newfoundland Academy of Art, in a house in downtown St. John's.

The creation of the Memorial University Extension Services and St. Michael's Printshop in the 1960s and 1970s attracted a number of visual artists to the province to teach and create art. Similarly, the school in Hibbs Hole (now Hibb's Cove), established by painter George Noseworthy, brought professional artists such as Anne Meredith Barry to the province.

The 1960s saw a significant increase in artists based on the island of Newfoundland. Painter Christopher Pratt returned to the province in 1961 with his wife Mary Pratt to work at the newly established Memorial University Art Gallery as its first curator, later transitioning to painting full-time in Salmonier. Wesleyville's David Blackwood graduated from the Ontario College of Art in the early 1960s and has achieved acclaim with his images of Newfoundland culture and history, though he no longer resides in the province. Newfoundland-born artist Gerald Squires returned in 1969. Other notable artists who developed their practices during this period include Marlene Creates, Diana Dabinett, Kathleen Knowling, Peter Bell, Frank Lapointe, Don Wright, Heidi Oberheide, Manfred Buchheit, Stewart Montgomerie, Jean Claude Roy and Pam Hall.

In 1975, Peter Bell, who was an art critic in addition to being an artist and gallery administrator, wrote: "There has never been anything remotely resembling an art movement in Newfoundland. There have been successive societies and associations of persons interested in painting, but there has been no group with a coherent style or philosophy, nor has there been any developmental succession from one artist to another. Artists in Newfoundland have been, and still are, isolated phenomena. Distinguished, certainly, but independent and unique."

=== Contemporary Art in Newfoundland ===
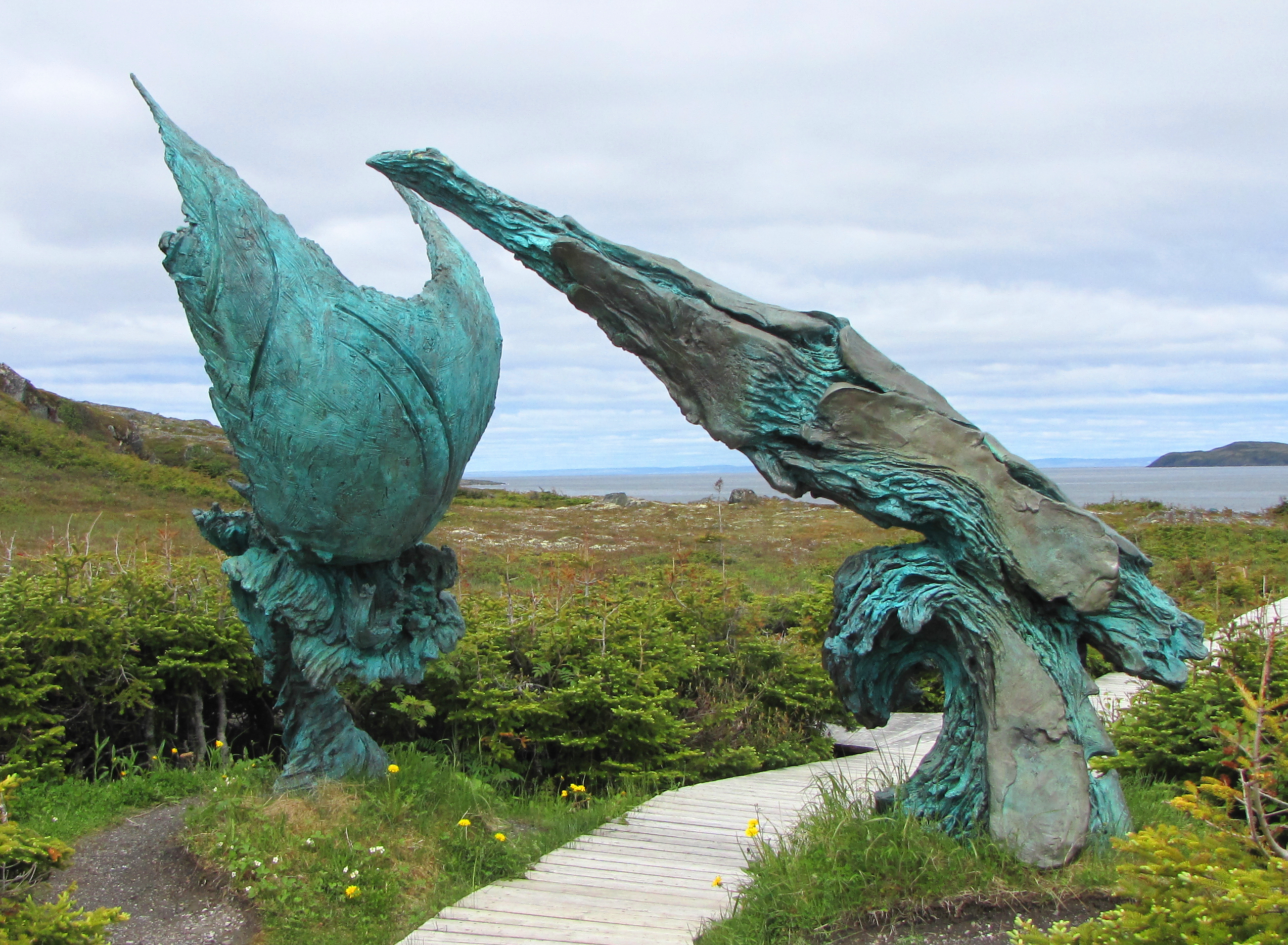
Luben Boykov. "The Meeting of Two Worlds" at L'Anse aux Meadows

From 1980 to present, opportunities for artists continued to develop, as art galleries such as the Art Gallery of Newfoundland and Labrador (which later became The Rooms Provincial Art Gallery), the Grenfell Art Gallery, the Resource Centre for the Arts, and Eastern Edge were established. Fine arts education programs were established at post-secondary institutions such as Sir Wilfred Grenfell College in Corner Brook, the Western Community College (now College of the North Atlantic) in Stephenville, the Prince Philip Drive College of the North Atlantic campus, and the Anna Templeton Centre in St. John's. Commercial art galleries such as Bonnie Leyton Gallery of Fine Art, Christina Parker Gallery, Emma Butler Gallery and Red Ochre Gallery, support the work of Newfoundland and Labradorian artists.

In the 1990s, Bulgarian artists came to this province through Gander Airport as part of a decade-long influx of refugees from the Soviet Bloc. Notably, Luben Boykov, Elena Popova, Vessela Brakalova and Veselina Tomova arrived in 1990. Ellie Yonova would arrive in 1999. Since then, each artist has contributed to the local creative landscape through their personal practices, exhibit design, publications, and public sculpture.

In April 2010, the Federal Government announced an investment of more than $1.5 million to assist the City of St. John's to redevelop the Tucker Premises in historic Quidi Vidi village. The Quidi Vidi Plantation was opened in 2012 as a "Craft Incubator," with 10 purpose-built studio spaces for local, emerging artisans.

The Sound Symposium was started in St John's, Nfld, in 1983. Symposia followed in 1984 and now take place every two years. The event brings together a range of local, national, and international artists working in sound, film, theatre, and dance.

Newfoundland and Labrador's arts community is now recognized nationally and internationally. Fogo Island Arts, launched in 2008 on Fogo Island, supports a residency-based contemporary art program. In 2013 and 2015, the province was represented at the Venice Biennale as Official Collateral Projects. In 2015, Philippa Jones became the first Newfoundland and Labrador artist to be included in the National Gallery of Canada contemporary art biennial after it was reinstated.

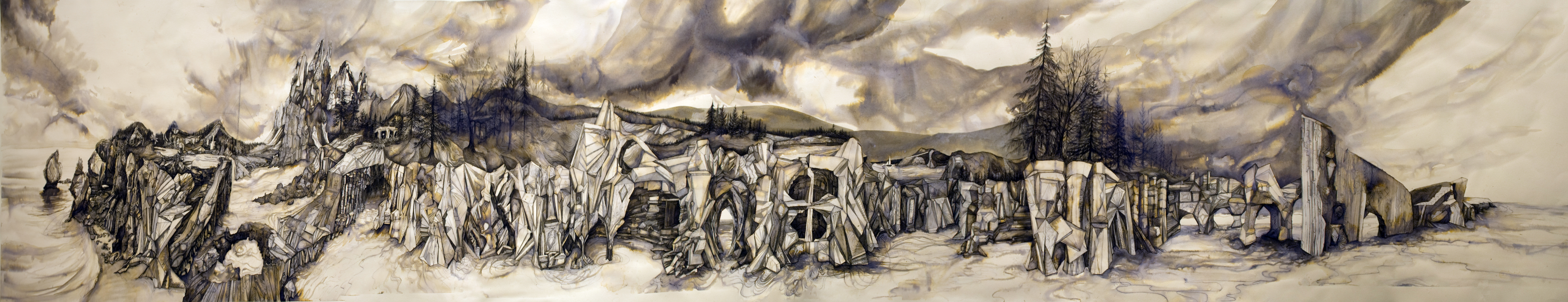
Philippa Jones. "MIRIAD Island" (2012), pen and ink on wove paper, 71.5 x 456.5 cm. Collection of National Gallery of Canada, Ottawa.

In 2016, in response to an exhibition featuring work by Will Gill, Philippa Jones, Jerry Ropson and others, author Lisa Moore wrote, "Newfoundland is a malleable idea, constantly being dreamt and reconfigured." "All cultures are in constant flux, of course. But Newfoundland, hyper-aware of being a distinct society, is at the same time riven with a kind of archival anxiety to hold fast to defining myths; the stories we tell to bring ourselves into existence. This anxiety might be a symptom caused by existing on the periphery, subject to constant swings in economic instability and geographical isolation in a sublime but rugged beauty."

In 2017 and 2019, Newfoundland hosted the Bonavista Biennale, a bi-annual exhibition of contemporary visual art by Indigenous, Canadian and international artists on the Bonavista Peninsula. 2019 Artists include: Jordan Bennett, Bob Blumer, Maria Magdalena Campos-Pons, Ian Carr-Harris + Yvonne Lammerich, Kym Greeley, Robert Hengeveld, Anna Helper, Jason Holley, Thaddeus Holownia, Barb Hunt +Jane Walker, Mark Igloliorte, Wanda Koop, Meagan Musseau, Sean Patrick O'Brien, Paulette Phillips, Meghan Price, Jerry Ropson, Camille Turner, and D'Arcy Wilson.

As of 2011, a study recorded approximately 1,200 artists in Newfoundland and Labrador, representing 0.47% of the province's labour force.

== Art Galleries ==
=== Commercial Art Galleries ===
Commercial fine art galleries in the province include: Bonnie Leyton Gallery of Fine Art; Emma Butler Gallery; Ewing Gallery; Christina Parker Gallery; Peter Lewis Gallery; and Red Ochre Gallery.

=== Christopher Pratt Gallery ===
Located in Bay Roberts, NL, the art gallery was named in honour of painter Christopher Pratt, who donated a permanent collection of his work.

=== Eastern Edge ===
Eastern Edge is an artist-run centre based in St. John's, Newfoundland and Labrador. Eastern Edge Gallery was established in 1984 as the first artist-run centre in the province. It remains the only artist-run gallery in the province that is dedicated to the presentation of contemporary art in all media. In 1987, it moved out of the LSPU Hall in to Flavin St, where City Building inspectors posted "stop-occupancy orders." Eastern Edge Gallery moved to its current Harbour Drive location on November 5, 1988

=== Fogo Island Gallery ===
Located in the Fogo Island Inn, the gallery is a 1200 square foot purpose-built space. Artists are selected from participants in the Fogo Island Arts' residency program.

=== Grenfell Campus Art Gallery ===
Grenfell Art Gallery was established in 1988, and is located on the second floor of the Fine Arts Building in Corner Brook.

=== Craft Council Gallery ===
The Craft Council Gallery is part of the Craft Council of Newfoundland and Labrador. The gallery features exhibitions of contemporary artists working in craft practices such as Susan Furneaux, Katie Pharnam, Teresa Kachanoski.

=== The Rooms Provincial Art Gallery ===
The Rooms Provincial Art Gallery of Newfoundland and Labrador is the major public gallery in the province. The gallery exhibits original visual art, conducts research, educates about art, and is responsible for permanent art collections held in trust for the public. The Rooms provides 10,000 square feet of gallery space for temporary exhibits, normally balanced between exhibitions produced by the gallery and those borrowed from elsewhere. Exhibitions are toured to satellite galleries throughout the province: Mary March Provincial Museum in Grand Falls-Windsor, the Provincial Seamen's Museum in Grand Bank; and the Labrador Interpretation Centre in North West River.

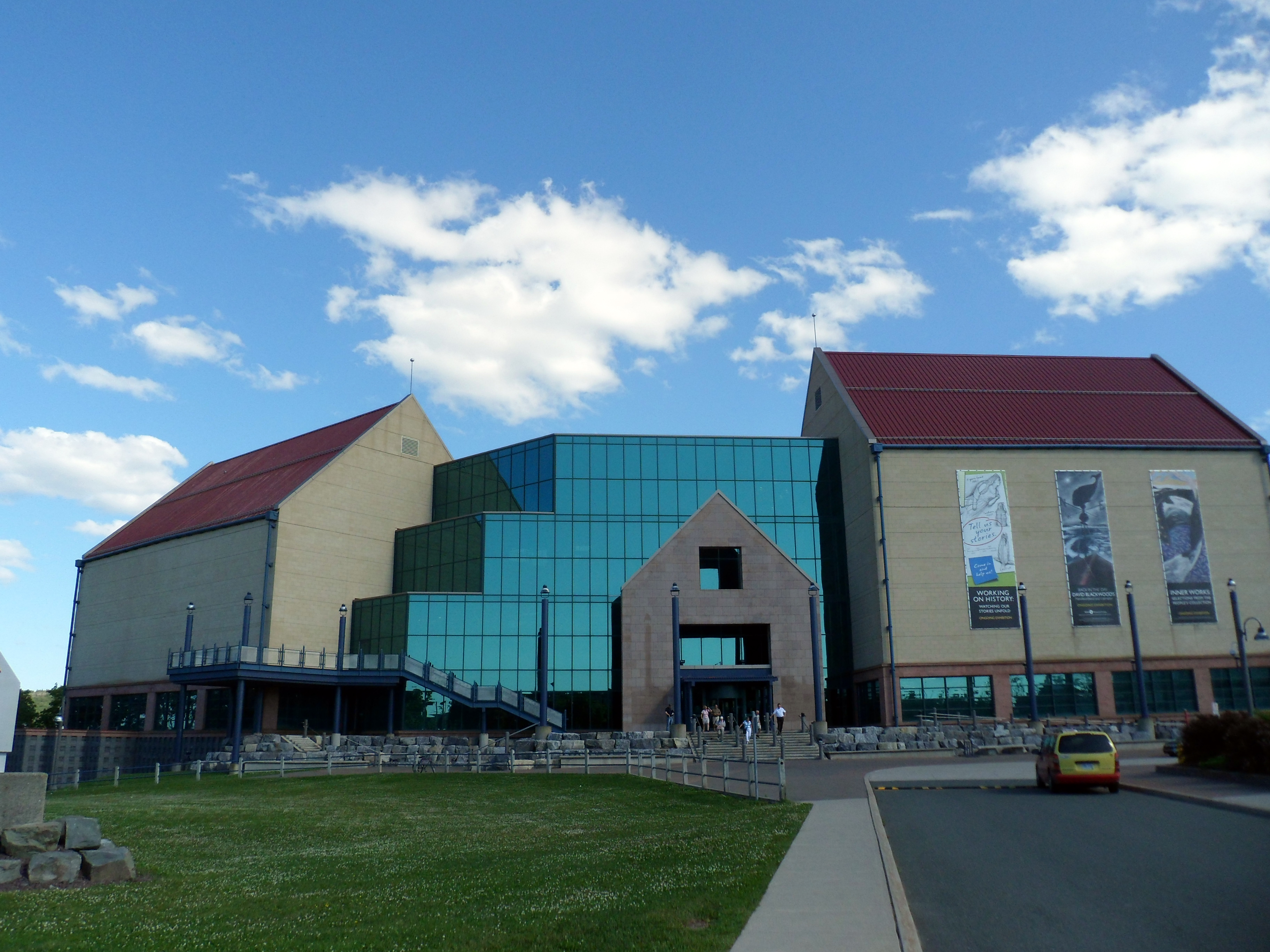
The Rooms, St John's NL

The gallery manages several collections, known together as the "Permanent Collections": Memorial University of Newfoundland; the J. K. Pratt Memorial Collection; The Rooms Collection; and the Art Procurement Collection of the Government of Newfoundland and Labrador (Provincial Art Bank). Altogether, they comprise over 7,000 works of art, primarily post-1960 Canadian art. Emphasis is placed on art from Newfoundland and Labrador, with major holdings of such artists as Christopher Pratt, Mary Pratt, Gerald Squires, David Blackwood, Reginald Shepherd, Helen Parsons Shepherd, Don Wright, Anne Meredith Barry, Marlene Creates, Helen Gregory, Pam Hall, Ned Pratt, and many others.

The gallery began in the university library in 1961. Moving to the St. John's Arts and Culture Centre in 1968, the gallery took on a more active provincial role by organizing regular touring exhibitions to other arts and culture centres. Memorial's Art Gallery became the Art Gallery of Newfoundland and Labrador in 1994, and then The Rooms Provincial Art Gallery in 2004. Over the years, its administrators have included Peter Bell, Frank Lapointe, Edythe Goodridge, Patricia Grattan, Gordon Laurin, Shauna McCabe, Megan Williams, Sheila Perry, and Vicky Chainey Gagnon. Kate Wolforth is the current Director. Bruce Johnson was Curator of Contemporary Art until 2013, and Caroline Stone the Curator of Historical Art and Collections until 2014. Mireille Eagan is the current Curator of Contemporary Art.

=== Tina Dolter Gallery ===
The Tina Dolter Gallery, as well as its partner gallery, The Open Gallery, is a public gallery located in the Rotary Arts Centre in downtown Corner Brook, NL. It is a juried exhibition space intended for emerging and mid-career artists.

== See also ==
- Statue of John Cabot (St. John's, Newfoundland and Labrador)
- The Fighting Newfoundlander
