= St. Michael's Printshop =

Coordinates: 47.564496°N 52.705652°W

St. Michael's Printshop is an artist-run print studio in St. John's, Newfoundland and Labrador. Founded in 1974, it provides fine art printmaking facilities for established and emerging artists, including intaglio, lithography, and relief printing. It also offers studio rentals, workshops and exhibition space, and maintains an artist-in-residence program.

== History ==
The printshop was founded in 1974 by artists Don Wright and Heidi Oberheide. Briefly housed in an old airport hangar in St. John's, its first permanent home was a former schoolhouse in the small outport community of St. Michael's, on the southern shore of the Avalon Peninsula. Funding for the venture came from Canada Council for the Arts and Memorial University of Newfoundland. Wright and Oberheide had both recently arrived in Newfoundland, having trained as printmakers elsewhere. The printshop initially had two etching presses and a lithography press. It offered workshops and space for visiting artists, and early visitors included Joyce Wieland and Landon Mackenzie.

In 1985, the printshop relocated from St. Michael's to the city of St. John's, where it took over an abandoned sail loft. It has been an important part of the art community in Newfoundland, providing a space for teaching and training, exhibitions, professional development, and artistic collaboration.

In 1991 St. Michael's initiated the Don Wright Scholarship, which provides a recent visual arts graduate with a year's access to the studio. In 2014, the printshop's history was documented by Kevin Major in Printmaking on the Edge: 40 Years at St. Michael's.

2024 was the 50th anniversary of the Printshop, celebrated through a series of workshops and exhibitions highlighting the history and current works of St. Michael's.

== Artists ==
Below is a partial list of some of the many artists associated with the printshop:

- Anne Meredith Barry
- Nancy Edell
- Angelo Evelyn
- Kym Greeley
- Libby Hague
- Pam Hall
- Philippa Jones
- Harold Klunder
- Peter Lazarov
- Landon Mackenzie
- Doris McCarthy
- Christopher Pratt
- Mary Pratt
- Gerald Squires
- Ericka Walker

== Sources ==
- Major, Kevin (2014). Printmaking on the Edge: 40 Years at St. Michael's. St. John's, Newfoundland and Labrador: St. Michael's Printshop. ISBN 978-0-9939030-0-7.
