= Grenfell Art Gallery =

Art museum at Memorial University of Newfoundland

The Grenfell Art Gallery is a contemporary art museum on Grenfell Campus, Memorial University in Corner Brook, Newfoundland. Established in 1988, the gallery is closely associated with the university's visual arts program, and is situated on the second floor of the Fine Arts Building on campus. Its collection includes more than 5,000 works spanning Canadian historical and contemporary art.

As of 2024, its director is Jane Walker. Previous directors include Colleen O'Neill (1988–1998), Gail Tuttle (1998–2008), Charlotte Jones (2009–2017), and Matthew Hills (2017–2023).

The Grenfell Gallery facilitates the North-West-River-Artist-In-Residence. It has also hosted artists in residence at Grenfell Campus.

== Exhibitions and events ==
The gallery exhibits Canadian and international artists year round. Recent shows have included such prominent artists as Sobey Art Award winner Ursula Johnson, as well as Anne Troake, who both exhibited in 2015. Other noted exhibitions include:

- Adrian Stimson: Blood From A Stone (2018)
- Jordan Bennett: wije'mi (Come With Me) (2017)
- Jennifer Barrett, Narrative NL (2015)
- Barb Hunt: Pink (2002)
- John Greer: Manifest (1998)

The gallery is also the host site for the Saltbox Contemporary Arts Festival, a biennial performance art festival founded in 2016.

== See also ==
- Art of Newfoundland and Labrador
