= Ann Barry =

Ann or Anne Barry may refer to:

- Ann Street Barry (1733–1801), English stage actress
- Anne Meredith Barry (1932–2003), Canadian visual artist
- Anne Barry, character in 6,000 Enemies
