= Lazarov =

Lazarov, Lazaroff, Lazarof (Cyrillic: Лазаров), female Lazarova is a common Bulgarian family name. The family name is derived from the personal name Лазар Lazar, "Lazarus". Slovak Lazarová is a female form of surname Lazar.

The following people share this surname:

- Alexandar Lazarov (born 1997), Bulgarian tennis player
- Andrej Lazarov (1999–2025), Macedonian footballer
- Barbara Lazaroff, American interior designer and restaurateur
- Jorge Lazaroff (1950–1989), Uruguayan composer of paternal Bulgarian origin
- Henri Lazarof (1932–2013), Bulgarian composer
- Kiril Lazarov (born 1980), Macedonian handball player
- Iliya Lazarov (born 1965), Bulgarian politician
- Lydia Lazarov (born 1946), Israeli yachting world champion
- Mihail Lazarov (born 1980), Bulgarian footballer
- Nikola Lazarov (1870–1942), Bulgarian architect
- Petar Lazarov (born 1985), Bulgarian footballer
- Peter Lazarov (born 1958), Bulgarian-Dutch artist printmaker
- Ruzha Lazarova (born 1968), Bulgarian French language writer
- Shimon Lazaroff (born 1942), Chassidic Rabbi in Texas
- Vanja Lazarova (1930–2017), Macedonian folk singer
- Yehezkel Lazarov (born 1974), Israeli actor of paternal Bulgarian origin
- Zdravko Lazarov (born 1976), Bulgarian footballer
