= Ursula Johnson =

Canadian Mi'kmaq artist

- Born: 1980 (age 45–46); Sydney, Nova Scotia, Canada
- Education: NSCAD University, BFA
- Website: ursulajohnson.ca

Ursula Johnson (born 1980) is a multidisciplinary Mi’kmaq artist based in Halifax, Nova Scotia, Canada. Her work combines the Mi’kmaq tradition of basket weaving with sculpture, installation, and performance art. In all its manifestations her work operates as didactic intervention, seeking to both confront and educate her viewers about issues of identity, colonial history, tradition, and cultural practice. In 2017, she won the Sobey Art Award.

== Early life and education ==
Ursula A. Johnson was born in Sydney, Nova Scotia, in 1980. She was raised in Eskasoni First Nation, Cape Breton, which lays claim to be the largest Mi’kmaq community in the world. She was taught basket weaving by her great-grandmother, renowned artist Caroline Gould. Johnson participated in the Permanent Forum on Indigenous Issues at the United Nations, focusing on creating the first Indigenous Youth Caucus within the institution.

Johnson pursued a post-secondary education, first enrolling in the Theatre Arts Program at the University of Cape Breton (1998-2000) in nearby Sydney, NS. She then moved to Halifax in 2002 to attend NSCAD University, earning an interdisciplinary BFA degree in 2006. Johnson then became the first Artist-in-residence at Cape Breton University.

== Basket weaving ==
Many of Johnson's exhibitions and performances include basket weaving, emphasizing traditional Mi’kmaq techniques and forms. Johnson's work in basket weaving draws attention to the way in which baskets have traditionally been placed in anthropological and historical exhibits instead of being celebrated as a continuing indigenous cultural practice. Her work blurs the line between baskets as artifacts, commodities, and art objects. Several of her experimental basket works were shown in O’pltek (It's Not Right), a solo show at the Thunder Bay Art Gallery in 2011. In her 2006 piece for Nations in a Circle in Halifax Johnson wove a basket around herself, employing the traditional methods for the first time since her move off the reserve in an exploration of her self-defined identity as an Urban Aboriginal artist engaged with traditional Mi’kmaq cultural production and traditions. As part of her residency at Cape Breton University, Johnson developed and taught a course called “The Role of the Mi’kmaw Basket in Contemporary Fine Craft”. Johnson has also taught basket weaving through NSCAD's extended studies department. Johnson organized a 30-year retrospective of Caroline Gould's work Kloqowej (Star) at the Mary E. Black gallery before Gould's death in 2011.

== Nocturne projects ==
Johnson has produced multiple projects for multiple iterations of Nocturne: Art at Night, an annual free art festival in Halifax, Nova Scotia that takes place between 6pm and midnight:

=== Elmiet - 2010 ===
For the 2010, Nocturne Festival and the Prismatic Festival Johnson created a performance piece called Elmiet, a Mi’kmaq verb meaning “to go home”, drawing attention to the history of scalping in Nova Scotia. Johnson declared the performance the last scalping in Nova Scotia. Scalping is a practice that dates back to the founding of Halifax and the 1756 Scalping Proclamation has remained in legislation despite a public apology by the Nova Scotia Government in 2000. For the performance Johnson wore a headpiece made from traditional Mi’kmaq basket weaving techniques, covering her eyes and trailing down her back like hair. She began the performance by being led through downtown Halifax by a guide and a group doing parkour who embodied the idea of energy flowing through the surroundings. At 9 pm the performance culminated on the steps of the Grand Parade (Halifax). Johnson then invited a member of the audience to remove her headpiece and symbolically scalp her.

=== Hot Looking - 2013 ===
For Nocturne 2013, Johnson collaborated with Soto Pow Wow dancer, Bert Milberg, to create a response to the 2012 No Doubt music video for Looking Hot. For the performance Milberg danced from 6pm to midnight in the storefront window of a luxury shop on Spring Garden road. He danced in full regalia to Looking Hot on a loop, intermittently stopping to sit and pose as viewers took pictures and video. The piece was a response to the appropriation and commodification of indigenous cultures and identity.

=== L'nuisimk: El-noo-wee-simk: Speaking Indian - 2018 ===
For Nocturne 2018 (curated by Raven Davis), Johnson and partner, Angella Parsons, performed as Kinuk (their performance duo). Throughout the event, they performed three durational and mobile performances across Halifax and Dartmouth. Speaking to each other in their first languages, Johnson in Mi'kmaw and Parsons in English, the conversations engaged with themes of vulnerability, intimacy, and more immediately, their surroundings.

== Solo exhibitions ==
- 2023: "Emmitukwemk: The Visit." The Blue Building, Halifax, Nova Scotia
- 2021: "ITHA: The Livingroom." The Blue Building, Halifax, Nova Scotia
- 2018: "Ke'tapekiaq Ma'qimikew: The Land Sings / La terre chante." SBC Gallery, Montreal, Quebec
- 2018: "The Indian Truckhouse of High Art." Central Art Garage, Ottawa, Ontario
- 2017: "Mi'kwite'tmn (Do You Remember)." The Reach Gallery Museum, Abbotsford, British Columbia, Canada
- 2015: "Mi'kwite'tmn (Do You Remember)." Confederation Centre Art Gallery, Charlottetown, PEI
- 2014: "Mi'kwite'tmn (Do You Remember)." College Art Gallery 1, University of Saskatchewan, Saskatoon, Saskatchewan
- 2014: "Mi'kwite'tmn (Do You Remember)." Saint Mary's University Art Gallery, Halifax, Nova Scotia
- 2012: "L’nuk" (in collaboration with Jordan A. Bennett). Anna Leonowens Art Gallery, Halifax, Nova Scotia
- 2011: "The Indian Truckhouse of High Art." Site specific performance/installation in downtown Halifax, Nova Scotia
- 2010: "O’pltek." Thunder Bay Art Gallery, Thunder Bay, Ontario
- 2004: "Kepmidedamnej." NSCAD University, Halifax, Nova Scotia
- 2003: "Ente’k." Nova Scotia College of Art & Design, Halifax Nova Scotia
- 2002: "Klo’ke’wej." Micmac Native Friendship Centre, Halifax, Nova Scotia

== Group shows ==
- 2023: "Landscape and Stories." The Blue Building, Halifax, Nova Scotia
- 2021: "Soft Launch." The Blue Building, Halifax, Nova Scotia
- 2019: Àbadakone | Continuous Fire | Feu continuel. National Gallery of Canada Ottawa, Ontario
- 2018: "#callresponse." St. Mary's University Art Gallery, Halifax, Nova Scotia
- 2018: "Nanabozho's Sisters." Dalhousie Art Gallery, Halifax, Nova Scotia
- 2017: "INSURGENCE/RESURGENCE." Winnipeg Art Gallery, Winnipeg, Manitoba
- 2017: UnSettled. Queer Arts Festival, Vancouver, BC
- 2017: "Landmarks2017."
- 2014: "Memory Keepers." Urban Shaman Gallery, Winnipeg, Manitoba
- 2014: "Making Otherwise: Craft and Material Fluency in Contemporary Art." Carleton University Art Gallery, Ottawa, Ontario
- 2013: "L'nuwelti'k." Festival jè-st, Moncton, New Brunswick
- 2013: "Aboriginal Voice: Four Artists from Atlantic Canada." Galerie d'art Louise et Reuben Cohen, Moncton, New Brunswick
- 2013: "Maqimikew Ketapiaq (The Land Sings)." AntigoNIGHT Festival, Antigonish, Nova Scotia
- 2013: "L'unwesimk:El-noo-wee-simk" (in collaboration with Angella Parsons). Art in the Open Festival, Charlottetown, PEI
- 2013: "Ke Pite'm." Cape Breton University Art Gallery, Sydney, Nova Scotia
- 2012: The Indian Truckhouse of High Art. Awards. Celebration., Creative Nova Scotia Awards Celebration, Halifax, Nova Scotia
- 2012: L’nuwelti’k. Prismatic Festival, Halifax, Nova Scotia
- 2012: Basket Weaving. Planet IndigenUS Festival Harbourfront Centre, Toronto Ontario
- 2012: Snapshot. Khyber Centre for the Arts, Halifax, Nova Scotia
- 2012: Material Wealth: Revealing Landscape. Harbourfront Centre, Toronto, Ontario
- 2011: Ancestral Teachings: Contemporary Perspectives. Thunderbird Centre, Toronto, Ontario
- 2011: Basket Weaving. Debajehmujig 6 Foot Festival, Manitowaning, Ontario
- 2010: Elmiet. Nocturne and Prismatic Arts Festival, Halifax, Nova Scotia
- 2010: L’nuk. (In Collaboration with Jordan A. Bennett), The Other Gallery, Banff, Alberta
- 2010: Ka’kawej. Art in Public Spaces, Banff Centre for the Arts, Banff, Alberta
- 2009: Ke Pite’m. Time Will Tell Public Performance Series, Eye Level Gallery, Halifax, Nova Scotia
- 2009: Traditional Mi’kmaq Basketry. Tent Dwellers Canoe Festival, Kejimkujik National Park, Nova Scotia
- 2009: Traditional Mi’kmaq Basketry. Treaty Day Aboriginal Arts Showcase, Halifax, Nova Scotia
- 2008: The Urban Aboriginal Guide to Halifax NS. Dalhousie University Art Gallery, Halifax, Nova Scotia
- 2006: Untitled. Anna Leonowens Gallery, Halifax, Nova Scotia
- 2005: Traditional Storytelling Nations In A Circle. Pier 21, Halifax, Nova Scotia
- 2003: Basket Weaving Nations In A Circle. Dalhousie Sculpture Court, Halifax, Nova Scotia

== Curatorial projects ==
- 2011: Kloqowej: A 30 Year Retrospective of Caroline Gould. Mary E. Black Gallery, Halifax, Nova Scotia
- 2004: Showcase of Aboriginal Arts and Crafts. King's College, Halifax, Nova Scotia
- 2001: Aboriginal Youth Art Exhibit. Micmac Friendship Center, Halifax, Nova Scotia

== Residencies ==
- 2022: Ocean Fellowship, TBA21 Academy, Venice, Italy
- 2014: Artist-in-residence, The Pictou Island Portages (part of The Great Canadian Pilgrimages Project, curated by Eryn Foster), Pictou Island, Nova Scotia
- 2013: Artist-in-residence, University of Edinburgh, Edinburgh College of Art & Design with Scottish Sculpture Workshops and The Naked Craft Network, Scotland, UK
- 2013 – 2014: As the first Artist-in-residence, Johnson has been teaching a class entitled “The Role of the Mi’kmaw Basket in Contemporary Fine Craft”. Cape Breton University Art Gallery and Unama’ki College, Glace Bay, NS
- 2012: Artist-in-residence, Mount Saint Vincent University Art Gallery, Halifax, Nova Scotia
- 2011: Artist-in-residence, Klondike Institute for Arts and Culture, Dawson City, Yukon
- 2011: Visiting Artist, Debajehmujig Creation Centre, Manitowaning, Ontario
- 2010: Flying Eagle Internship. Onelight Theatre Co. and Canada Council for the Arts, Halifax, Nova Scotia
- 2010: Thematic Residency on Indigenous Languages. Banff Centre for the Arts, Banff, Alberta

== Awards ==
- 2019: Nova Scotia Masterworks Arts Award (for Moose Fence, 2017), Nova Scotia Masterworks
- 2017: Sobey Art Award
- 2017: REVEAL Indigenous Art Award, Hnatyshyn Foundation
- 2014: Aboriginal Traditional Art Forms Creation Grant, Canada Council for the Arts
- 2013: Grants to Individuals Presentation Grant, Arts Nova Scotia
- 2010: Grants to Individuals Presentation Grant, Nova Scotia Tourism, Culture & Heritage
- 2010: Flying Eagle Program, Canada Council for the Arts
- 2010: Grants to Individuals Creation Grant, Nova Scotia Tourism, Culture & Heritage
- 2009: Aboriginal Peoples Collaborative Exchange Travel Grant, Canada Council for the Arts
- 2008: Aboriginal Traditional Visual Art Forms Research Grant, Canada Council for the Arts

== Teaching ==
- 2013: "The Role of the Mi’kmaw Basket in Contemporary Fine Art". University College of Cape Breton, Glace Bay, NS
- 2012: "Intro to Mi’kmaw Language". Micmac Child Development Centre, Halifax, NS
- 2011–2012: "Intro to Mi’kmaw Basketry". NSCADU School of Extended Studies, Halifax NS
- 2010: "Mi’kmaw Basketry".Thunder Bay Art Gallery, Thunder Bay ON
- 2004–2008: Facilitator/Instructor Various Workshops for At-Risk Youth

== Community involvement ==
At the 2015 Storytelling Festival at Kejimkujik National Park, Johnson led a craft workshop and a campfire storytelling session, called the Legend of Jipijka’m – The Green-Horned Serpent. She worked with children to create a puppet of Jipijka’m, which is a legendary creature from Mi'kmaq mythology, it was later used while she shared the legend. In an interview with Ku'ku'kwes News, she explained “It’s a rather large serpent-like creature that’s based upon one of the folklore characters that we see in the petroglyphs at Kejimkujik which is often referred to as jipijka’m or the great-horned serpent”. Johnson had been involved with the storytelling festival since its beginning in 2011 and worked as an Interpreter at the park, utilizing her theatre and fine arts training to share the oral traditions passed on to her by her family.

On January 25, 2014, as part of the Ideal Law Conference hosted by the Social Activist Law Student Association of Dalhousie University, Ursula Johnson performed a durational song as a form of social resistance, joined by a Mi’kmaq elder. For the performance Johnson called “IKATK” (“She Protects”) the two women extended invitations for audience members to join in their performance or to stand in solidarity with them. The protest lasted four hours, from 9 am to 1 pm, and was held at the Schulich School of Law in Halifax, Nova Scotia.

On May 22, 2009, Johnson participated in the UNICEF sponsored panel “Taking Advocacy Digital: Emerging Online Indigenous Networks”, in New York, USA. The panel, a “side event of the Eighth Session of the United Nations Permanent Forum on Indigenous Issues.” featured representatives of various Indigenous Youth Organizations brought together to discuss the engagement of indigenous youth with “the global community in a digital age.” Johnson took part as the Director of Kitpu Youth Centre, located at the Mi’kmaw Native Friendship Centre, Halifax, NS, from April 2006 to May 2009.
