= Marlene Creates =

Canadian artist (born 1952)

- Born: Marlene Creates; 1952 (age 73–74); Montreal, Quebec, Canada
- Known for: visual artist, poet
- Movement: Environmentalism
- Awards: Governor General’s Award in Visual and Media Arts (2019), Order of Newfoundland and Labrador (2021), Doctor of Letters (2024)
- Elected: Royal Canadian Academy of Arts (2001)
- Website: www.marlenecreates.ca

Marlene Creates ONL RCA (born 1952) is a Canadian artist lives and works in Portugal Cove, Newfoundland and Labrador. Born in Montreal, Quebec, Creates studied visual arts at Queen's University, then lived in Ottawa for twelve years, moving to Newfoundland and Labrador in 1985.

A major theme of her work is the relationship between human beings and the land; she often photographs subtle traces and marks of human presence in natural environments. Her work has been shown in over 300 exhibitions across the world.

In 2001, Creates was elected to the Royal Canadian Academy of Arts, and in 2013 she won CONTACT Photography Festival's BMW Prize for her exhibition Marlene Creates: selected works from 30 years, 1982-2012. The exhibition "gently invites us to think about how we belong to the land, and how we leave our touch upon it." Creates was a 2019 recipient of the Canadian Governor General's Award in Visual and Media Arts. In 2021, she was invested into the Order of Newfoundland and Labrador, "the highest honour that the Province can bestow" and recognizes "individuals who have demonstrated excellence and achievement in any field of endeavour benefiting, in an outstanding manner, Newfoundland and Labrador and its residents." In 2024, she received an honorary Doctor of Letters (D. Litt.) from Memorial University.

== Education ==
Creates attained her bachelor's in art education at Queens University in Kingston, Ontario, attending from 1970 – 1974. She traveled to Venice, Italy in 1973 as part of the university's Art and Architecture Study. In 1975, she was selected as a Canadian delegate to France for an Architecture Study Program.

== Artistic career ==
As part of the Art Gallery of Ontario Extension Services "Artist with their Work" Program, Creates exhibited a collection of thirteen cibachrome photographs of landscapes on the east and west coasts of Canada, England, Wales, and Ireland. In describing the exhibit she says:

"The actions of nature may seem random or unpredictable; the way smooth stones sit naturally at the shore appears to have no organization. I have found though, that if I manipulate any of them, the interference is obvious. The kind of order I impose is unlikely to occur naturally. But the imposition is slight. The next high tide will disturb my arrangement and re-organize the elements again. Nature is never finished."

As a part of the exhibit, Creates also hosted an illustrated lecture and landscape art workshop with local participants in the Thunder Bay region. Creates also toured with the exhibit to Windsor.

Creates has centered her recent work around six acres of woods (owned by the artist) in Portugal Cove, Newfoundland and Labrador. There she has established the Boreal Forest Poetry Garden, which sees annual thematic programming of live art, poetry readings and collaborations between artists, while making thematic links between art and science.

A major retrospective of Marlene Creates' work called Marlene Creates: Places Paths and Pauses toured across Canada from 2017 to 2019. Curated by Susan Gibson Garvey (independent curator; former Director/Curator, Dalhousie Art Gallery) and Andrea Kunard (Associate Curator of Photography, National Gallery of Canada), and organized by The Beaverbrook Art Gallery and the Dalhousie University Art Gallery, the exhibition was hosted by The Dalhousie Art Gallery (Halifax, Nova Scotia), the Beaverbrook Art Gallery^{[3]} (Fredericton, New Brunswick), The Rooms Art Gallery (St. John's, Newfoundland and Labrador), Confederation Centre Art Gallery (Charlottetown, Prince Edward Island), and Carleton University Art Gallery (Ottawa, Ontario). An accompanying catalogue presents the work from the exhibition, with text by the curators (published by Goose Lane Editions, Fredericton, 2017).

=== Awards ===
- Queen's University Bursary for study in Venice, Italy 1973−
- Ontario Arts Council Grants
- Canada Council Grants
- Governor General's Award in Visual and Media Arts 2019
- Order of Newfoundland and Labrador (2021)
- Honorary Doctor of Letters (D. Litt.), Memorial University (2024).

=== Bibliography ===
- Jenkner, Ingrid; Kathleen Ritter (1998). Marlene Creates: Language and Land Use, Newfoundland 1994. Halifax: MSVU Art Gallery. ISBN 1895215811.
