= Pam Hall (artist) =

Canadian artist, filmmaker and writer

Pam Hall (born 1951) is a Canadian artist, filmmaker and writer living in Newfoundland.

== Life and career ==
She was born in Kingston, Ontario and received a BFA from Concordia University and a MEd (Art Education) from the University of Alberta. In 1973, Hall moved to St. John's. She taught art and worked for the provincial Department of Education.

Hall provided the illustrations for the 1977 children's book Down By Jim Long's Stage written by Al Pittman; she received the Amelia Frances Howard-Gibbon Illustrator's Award from the Canadian Library Association for her work. In 1982, she wrote and illustrated On the Edge of the Eastern Ocean.

She held solo exhibitions at the Grenfell Art Gallery (later The Rooms) in 1982 and 1984. Her installation The Coil: A History in Four Parts was presented in Canada and Japan and later purchased by the National Gallery of Canada. In 2001, she presented the installation New Readings in Female Anatomy at the Art Gallery of Newfoundland (later The Rooms); the following year, it was presented at the Carleton University Art Gallery in Ottawa. Parts of this work have been presented in Vancouver, Montreal and Providence, Rhode Island. She was a founding member of the Eastern Edge Gallery in St. John's which is artist-run.

Her film Under the Knife: Personal Hystories was named Best Atlantic Canadian documentary at the Atlantic Film Festival in 1995. In 1998, she received the Best Art Direction Award at the festival for her work on the film Extraordinary Visitor.

Hall was a member of the Canadian Advisory Committee on the Status of the Artist in 1988. She has also served as president of the Cultural Industries Association for Newfoundland.

Her art is included in the collections of The Rooms Provincial Art Gallery, the National Gallery of Canada, the Canada Council Art Bank, Global Affairs Canada, Maruha Nichiro Corporation in Tokyo and the government of Newfoundland and Labrador.

In 2013, Hall received a PhD (Interdisciplinary: Sociology, Folklore, Humanities) from Memorial University of Newfoundland and in 2015 was appointed Memorial's Inaugural Public Engagement Postdoctoral Fellow. The art-and-knowledge project Towards an Encyclopedia of Local Knowledge was produced from this research in rural Newfoundland.

Hall's book Towards an Encyclopedia of Local Knowledge: Excerpts from Chapters I and II was published by St. John's-based Breakwater Books in 2017. The 160-page full-colour, hardcover book is visually presented as collage, using photographs, illustrations, handwritten text. The collection of images and text documents the customs, foodways, and material culture of rural Newfoundland.

The book has been described as "gorgeous" and "handsome." and explores the cultural knowledge of two rural areas in Newfoundland: Bonne Bay and the Great Northern Peninsula, and Fogo Island and Change Islands. More than a picture book, Hall's writing has been called "eloquent and compelling" and her respect for her research participants is evident in that all 142 of the project participants are listed as collaborators. Chapter III: The Middle River, created in partnership with Mi’kmaw artist Jerry Evans and supported by the Band Council in Miawpukek/Conne River, was exhibited at Grenfell Art Gallery in 2019. It is based on over three months of research in Conne River, NL and reveals some of the place-based knowledge shared by more than 70 collaborators there.

== Selected works ==
=== Filmography ===
- Finding Mary March (1988), as art director and set designer
- Secret Nation (1992), as art director
- Anchor Zone (1994), as production designer
- The Divine Ryans (1999), as art director
- Random Passage (2002), as art director consultant
- Heyday! (2006), as art director
- Above and Beyond (2006), as production designer
