= Josephina Kalleo =

Canadian visual artist

- Born: 1920; Nain, Newfoundland and Labrador
- Died: 1993 (aged 72–73)
- Known for: graphic artist, mixed media artist

Josephina Kalleo (1920 – 1993) was an Inuk visual artist from Nain, Newfoundland and Labrador, known for her colorful drawings of traditional Inuit life and for her book Taipsumane: A Collection of Labrador Stories (1984).

== Biography ==
Kalleo was born in Nain in 1920, and educated at the Moravian Mission there. She began drawing in her sixties, after raising five children. She became interested in recording her experiences while working at the Torng'sok Cultural Centre in Nain, where her job involved transcribing tapes of spoken Inuktitut. Using felt-tip markers, she drew vibrant, detailed scenes of Labrador Inuit life, documenting activities such as hunting and fishing, berry picking, marriage, and Christmas preparations. She drew on paper, and attached her drawings to standard-issue office file folders.

Kalleo's drawings have been included in exhibitions including North and South: Tradition, Invention and Intervention in Labrador (2002, The Rooms), and SakKijâjuk: Art and Craft from Nunatsiavut (2017, curated by Heather Igloliorte).

== Taipsumane: A Collection of Labrador Stories ==
In 1984, 45 of Kalleo's drawings were published in the book Taipsumane: A Collection of Labrador Stories. Taipsumane is an Inuktitut word meaning "Them Days," and the book includes Kalleo's descriptions of her childhood life in the 1920s and 30s. With titles such as Festive Dress, Traditional Foods, The Spring Camp, Unequal Trading, and Women as Trappers, the carefully labelled drawings illustrate traditional ways of gathering food and seasonal activities. Reviewer Roberta Buchanan noted that "Kalleo's vision is essentially elegiac, mourning for a past way of life and past values." The text appears in Inuktitut syllabics, Moravian Inuktitut (using the English alphabet), and English.

Taipsumane has been integrated into the Newfoundland and Labrador school curriculum, and has been described as "a vital document for the transmission of Inuit cultural knowledge among youth who grew up in a post-contact era." A 2018 Globe and Mail article notes that "These drawings, along with the oral history she recorded for each image, are considered one of the best descriptions of transitional Labrador Inuit life during the mid-20th century."

== Bibliography ==
- Taipsumane: A Collection of Labrador Stories (Nain, Newfoundland: TorngaÌ‚sok IlusituKanginni, 1984)
