= Fort Townshend (St John's) =

Coordinates: 47.566°N 52.711°W

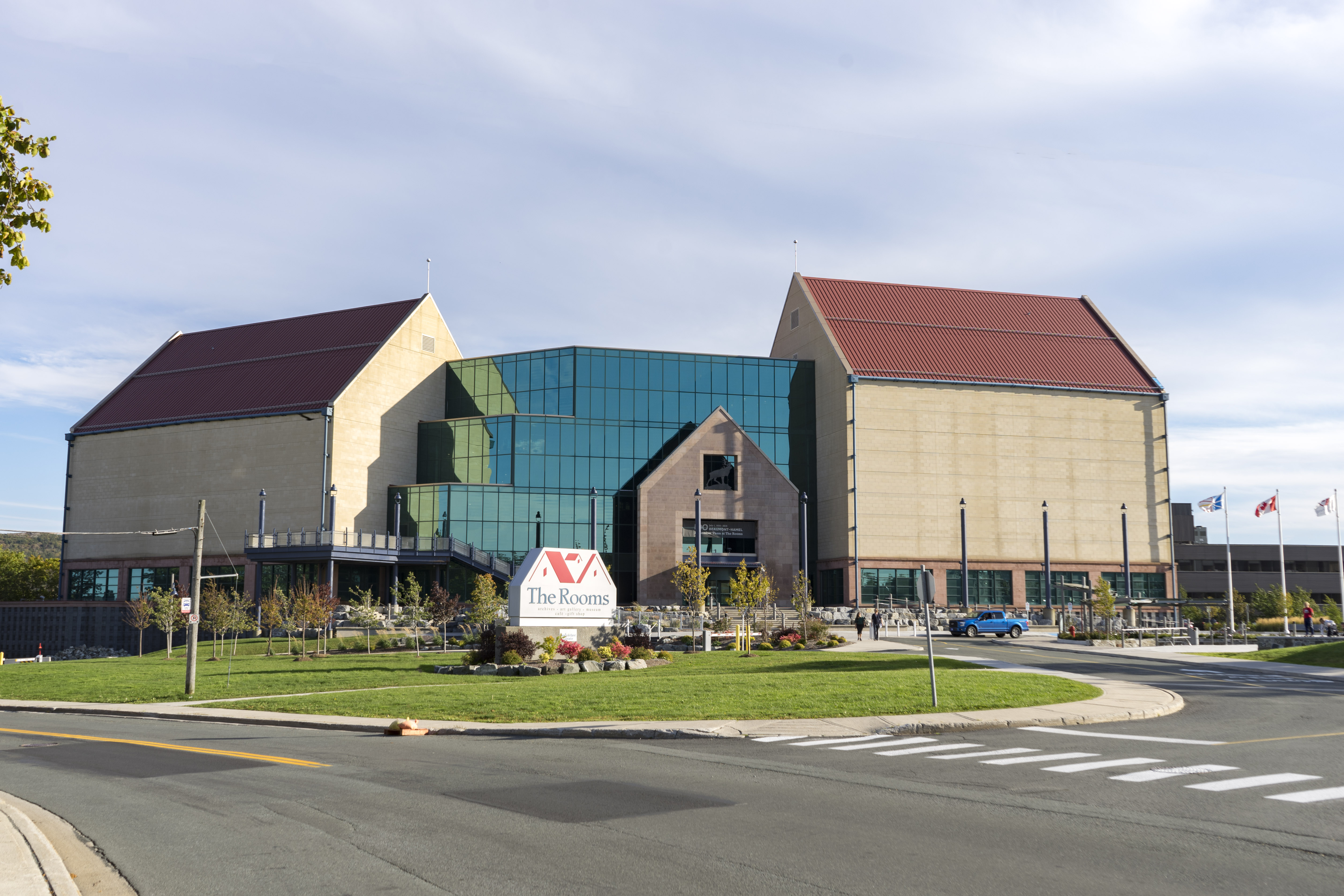
The Rooms (North face), where Fort Townshend stood

Fort Townshend is an archaeological site in St. John's, Newfoundland and Labrador that was designated a National Historic Site of Canada in 1951. The original military fort was built, as the headquarters of the British garrison, between 1775 and 1779, to secure St John's from attacks, from the French, as well as from American privateers, and it was abandoned in 1871. The great star-shaped citadel was one of the largest British fortifications in North America at the time. The Rooms which houses the Art Gallery, the Provincial Archives and the Provincial Museum, of Newfoundland and Labrador now stands on this site. During the planning and construction of the building much opposition was raised by archaeologists and historians.

== History ==
Because of the vulnerability of Fort William to artillery fire from Signal Hill, Fort Townshend was built between 1775 and 1779 to secure St John's from attacks, from the French, as well as from American privateers. The vulnerability of Fort William had been revealed when the French captured it in 1762, The American Revolution had increased the need to improve St. John's defences. By 1779 Colonel Robert Pringle of the Royal Engineers, and Commandant of the garrison, had completed the construction of Fort Townshend, which Governor Lord Shuldham had begun in 1773. A road (Military Road) had also been built, linking it with Fort William. Fort Townshend then became the headquarters of the Newfoundland garrison. Fort Townshend was enlarged and strengthened in 1796, because of a war with France, "as part of changes made to the entire defense system". "In the same year, a French fleet under the command of Admiral Richery appeared off the Narrows, but was deterred by the formidable appearance of the defences, and the fleet withdrew. With the impending threat from America as a result of the War of 1812, the Fort was again refortified although no conflicts took place there".

After garrison was withdrawn 1871 the fort had been allowed to decay, and the site became the home of the Royal Newfoundland Constabulary and, later, the St. John's Fire Department. However, though there are "few accessible remains of the fort, some may still be found in situ in the basement of The Rooms, which was built upon the original site" of the fort.

The Fort Townshend archaeological site was designated a National Historic Site of Canada in 1951.
