= Kym Greeley =

Canadian painter

Kym Greeley (born 1973) is a Canadian painter based in St. John's, Newfoundland and Labrador, known primarily for her screen-printed paintings of the province's landscape and roads. In 2011, she was longlisted for the Sobey Art Award, one of Canada's most prestigious contemporary art awards.

== Career ==
Greeley studied at the Cooper Union School for the Advancement of Art and Science in New York as part of an exchange program, graduating in 1996. She then graduated from the Nova Scotia College of Art and Design in 1997, where she majored in Painting and Drawing.

Greeley pursued a career as a contemporary artist in New York for five years, but found that her interests leaned towards the landscape. She returned to Newfoundland in 2003.

Her Newfoundland paintings evolved from her studies in abstraction while in New York, and portray contemporary Newfoundland subjects as unromantic, largely monochromatic representations that are abstracted from their original surroundings, textures and colors. She has described her paintings as "taken from a 'place' and made into a 'non-place'. ... This 'non-place' than becomes a representation of my feelings or experiences."

Greeley's paintings have since been exhibited in Germany, Canada and the United States. In 2009, Greeley participated in a four month residency at The Rooms in St. John's, Newfoundland and Labrador, which led to a solo exhibition entitled "Time Trial." In 2013, her work was included in a major survey of painting in Canada titled "The Painting Project," organized by Galerie UQAM.

After the birth of twins in 2014, Greeley's subject matter shifted to interiors. This body of work was shown at The Rooms as part of the exhibition "All Day Within the Dreamy House" in 2016.

Greeley has also worked with Fogo Island Arts as a consultant, and has collaborated with fellow artist Erika Jane Stephens Moore on caribou-themed wallpaper for the Fogo Island Inn. The wallpaper was included in the exhibition "Folklore and Other Panics" at The Rooms in 2015.

Her work is included in the Canada Council Art Bank, The Rooms Provincial Art Gallery, the Art Gallery of Nova Scotia and the Newfoundland Provincial Art Bank Collection. She is currently represented by Christina Parker Gallery.

== Exhibition history ==
=== Solo exhibitions ===
2017 Erasure, Maison Des Arts, Laval, Quebec

2015 Chasing The Light, Christina Parker Gallery, St. John's, NL

2011 I Love You, A1C Gallery, St. John's, NL

2009 Time Trial, The Rooms Provincial Art Gallery, St. John's, NL

2009 Wish You Were Here, Christina Parker Gallery, St. John's, NL

2008 TCH, Eastern Edge Gallery, St. John's, NL

2008 Phendrana Drift, Resource Center for the Arts Gallery, St. John's, NL

2006 100 Paper Moths, Site specific installation, Anglican Cathedral Park, St. John's, NL

2006 Landing, 312 Online Videos, www.312.ca

2004 New Paintings, The Rogue Gallery, Eastern Edge Gallery, St. John's, NL

2003 Phendrana, elefan+shipfischerinsel, Berlin, Germany

1998 Paintings, Anna Leonowens Gallery, Halifax, NS

1998 Portraits, Eye Level Gallery. Halifax, NS

1997 Solo, Anna Leonowens Gallery, Halifax, NS

=== Group exhibitions ===
2017 Time & Place, Christina Parker Gallery, St. John's, NL

2017 Geopoetics: Ranges of Motion, Curated by Kasia Basta. Stewart Hall Art Gallery, Pointe Claire, Quebec

2017 Imago Mundi, Curated by Francesca Valente. Italy

2016 All Day Within the Dreamy House, Curated by Vicky Chainey Gagnon, The Rooms Provincial Art Gallery, St. John's, NL

2016 After Fields, Southern Graphics Council International: Flux Location, Portland, OR, USA

2015 Folklore And Other Panics, The Rooms Provincial Art Gallery, St. John's, NL

2014 Changing Tides: Contemporary Art in Newfoundland and Labrador, McMichael Gallery, Kleinburg, ON

2013 Into The Night, Art Gallery of Nova Scotia, NS

2013 The Painting Project, Galerie de l'UQAM, Montreal, Quebec

2012 25 for 25, The Rooms Provincial Art Gallery, St. John's, NL

2012 25 for 25, Mary March Museum, Grand Falls, NL

2011 Limited Time Offer, The Rooms Provincial Art Gallery, St. John's, NL

2011 Atlanticus, Christina Parker Gallery, St. John's, NL

Art and Letters, The Rooms Provincial Art Gallery, St. John's, NL

Fogo Island Series, Christina Parker Gallery, St. John's, NL

2008 Forecast, Sir Wilfred Grenfell College Art Gallery, Corner Brook, NL

2008 Rock and Roll: Selected Contemporary Art in Newfoundland, A1C Gallery, St. John's, NL

2008 Eastern Edge Video Series 2008, The Rooms Provincial Art Gallery, St. John's, NL
