= Helen Parsons Shepherd =

Canadian artist

- Born: Helen Parsons; 16 January 1923; St. John's, Newfoundland
- Died: 9 May 2008 (aged 85); St. John's, Newfoundland and Labrador, Canada
- Education: Ontario College of Art, Toronto
- Known for: Painter: Portraits & Still-life in Oil

Helen Parsons Shepherd RCA LL. D. (16 January 1923 – 9 May 2008) was a Newfoundland and Labrador artist, known for her portraits and still-life paintings. Her father was the poet R.A. Parsons, and her brother was the painter Paul Parsons.

== Career ==
As an adult, Parsons studied at the Memorial University of Newfoundland. In 1944, she was accepted into the Ontario College of Art, where she was influenced by the Canadian portrait painter John Martin Alfsen. Parsons studied with Franklin Carmichael of Canada's Group of Seven in her first year at OCA. She graduated with a Bachelor of Fine Arts with Honours in 1948. That same year, she married Reginald Shepherd, a fellow student and artist. She moved to St. John's with Shepherd and co-founded the Newfoundland Academy of Art (NAA), the first art school in the province, where she taught from 1949–1961.

After the Shepherds closed the NAA in 1961, Parsons Shepherd devoted her time to commissioned portraits. These included numerous portraits of public officials and prominent members of the community, including the speakers of the House of Assembly, mayors of St. John's, and presidents of the Memorial University of Newfoundland. In 1976, she was commissioned to paint Prince Philip, and in 1984 painted the official portrait of then Governor General Edward Schreyer.

In 1978, Parsons Shepherd was elected to the Royal Canadian Academy of Art. She received an honorary doctorate from Memorial University of Newfoundland in 1988.

The Memorial University Art Gallery (now The Rooms Provincial Art Gallery) organized a solo exhibition of her work in 1975, which later toured Canada. The provincial gallery also held two major retrospectives of Parsons Shepherd and her husband, the first in 1989, called Four Decades, and the second in 2005–06, called Reginald and Helen Shepherd: A Retrospective. Their work was also the subject of the 2005 book, Reginald Shepherd, Helen Parsons Shepherd: A Life Composed, edited by Ronald Rompkey.

Parsons Shepherd's artwork is part of private and public collections including that of The Rooms, the Beaverbrook Art Gallery in Fredericton, New Brunswick, and the Power Corporation in Montreal, Quebec.

Parsons Shepherd worked on her art in St. John's during the winter and at Clarke's Beach, Newfoundland and Labrador, during the summer. She died in 2008 at the age of 85.
