= Sean Patrick O'Brien =

American professional wrestling referee (1988–2023)

Personal information
- Born: Sean Patrick O'Brien; 1988 Louisville, Kentucky
- Died: March 17, 2023 (aged 34–35)

Professional wrestling career
- Ring name(s): Sean Patrick O'Brien; SPO

Sean Patrick O'Brien (1988 – March 17, 2023) was an American professional wrestling referee.

== Life and career ==
O'Brien was born in 1988, in Louisville, Kentucky. He primarily worked on the independent circuit, notably Ohio Valley Wrestling.

O'Brien died on March 17, 2023.
