= Meghan Price =

Canadian artist

- Born: 1972 (age 53–54)
- Education: Concordia University, Montreal Centre for Contemporary Textiles
- Known for: Visual Art / Textiles
- Website: https://www.meghanprice.com

Meghan Price is a Canadian visual artist living in Montreal. She is known for her digital jacquard weaving, sculpture and textiles using plastics and other post-consumer waste.

== Biography ==
Meghan Price was born in 1972 in Montreal. Price holds an MFA from Concordia University and a DEC from the Montreal Centre For Contemporary Textiles. She has taught at OCAD University, Concordia University, Sheridan College and John Abbott College.

Geologic time, processes and formations, human-earth interactions and ideas related to the Anthropocene inform Price's work.

=== Selected Solo Exhibitions ===
- 2022, Best Estimate, United Contemporary, Toronto
- 2022, Grid, Harbourfront Centre, Toronto, Canada
- 2020, Land Line, YYZ Artist Outlet, Toronto, Canada with Suzanne Nacha
- 2019 The Bonavista Biennale, Bonavista Peninsula, Canada
- 2018, New Balance, Fiberspace, Stockholm, Sweden
- 2017, Watching Rocks, AKA artist-run, Saskatoon
- 2016, "Part Time Deep Time", Art Gallery of Southwestern Manitoba, Brandon, Canada

=== Selected Group Exhibitions ===
- 2024, "Erratic Behaviour", Kitchener-Waterloo Art Gallery, Kitchener, Canada
- 2023, "Climate Awakening: Crafting A Sustainable Future", Contemporary Craft, Pittsburgh, USA
- 2021, "Plastic Heart: Surface All the Way Through", Art Museum at the University of Toronto
- 2019, "L’abstraction dans le Jacquard", Centre Matéria, Quebec City, Canada
- 2019, "Becoming Lithocene", Walter Phillips Gallery, The Banff Centre, Banff, Canada
- 2018, "Longevity or a Lack Thereof", McClaren Art Centre, Barrie, Canada
- 2017, Tie Up, Draw Down, The Centre for Craft Creativity and Design, Asheville, NC
- 2015, Biennale du lin, Portneuf, Canada

=== Collections ===
- Idea Exchange contemporary textile collection
- Aimia
- Canada Goose
- RBC Bank
- TD Bank
