= Landon Mackenzie =

Canadian artist (born 1954)

- Born: 1954 (age 71–72)
- Education: Concordia University, NSCAD
- Known for: Painter, Educator
- Awards: Queen Elizabeth II Golden Jubilee Medal, Ian Wallace Excellence in Teaching Award, Queen Elizabeth II Diamond Jubilee Medal, Governor General's Award in Visual and Media Arts
- Website: landonmackenzie.com

Landon Mackenzie RCA (born 1954) is a Canadian artist based in Vancouver, Canada. She is known for her large-format paintings and works on paper and her contribution as a professor of painting at Emily Carr University of Art and Design where she continues as Professor Emerita).

== Early life and education ==
Landon Mackenzie grew up in Toronto, Canada and left at 17 to study at NSCAD in Halifax, leading to a Bachelor's of Fine Arts degree from the school (Nova Scotia School of Art and Design) (1972–1976). She later earned a Master's of Fine Arts from Concordia University in Montreal (1976–1979) where she studied with Guido Molinari and Irene F. Whittome. It was not until after completing art school that she began to fully pursue the discipline of painting. She received first prize at the Quebec Biennale of Painting in 1981 and began showing the Lost River Series with Galerie France Morin in Montreal.

== Career ==
Aware of the limits placed on many female artists, Mackenzie used her androgynous name "Landon" to her advantage in the early years of her practice. Mackenzie began her influential teaching career starting in Studio Art at Concordia University from 1978–1985, before relocating to Vancouver to join the faculty of the Emily Carr University of Art and Design in 1986. In the same year, she cofounded the 188 West 3rd studio building with other Vancouver artists.

Her paintings are characteristically large and intensely involved in the continuation of the history of painting. Her works have been featured in several installations from the collections of National Gallery of Canada, Vancouver Art Gallery, The Art Gallery of Ontario, and the Musée d'art contemporain de Montréal to name a few. Her paintings have also been exhibited at the Museum of Contemporary Art, Toronto, The Esker Foundation, Calgary, and the Confederation Centre Art Gallery in Charlottetown, Prince Edward Island, as well as in many solo and group shows in Canada and internationally. Over the past forty-five years, Mackenzie's works have been extensively written about both in the popular media and academically.

Mackenzie is known to be a significant mentor to younger artists coming out of Vancouver. She has been an influential educator, as she herself studied during the hotbed time of Conceptual Art at NSCAD in Halifax. This period is of great interest to many young artists working around her. Further, she is known for her critically acclaimed Lost River Series characterized within the movement of New Image Painting of the early 1980s.

Mackenzie was the first to receive the rank of Full Professor, when the Emily Carr University of Art and Design, (formerly known as the Vancouver School of Art, established 1925, then a College, then an Institute), became a University in 2008. In 2009, she was awarded the Inaugural Ian Wallace Excellence in Teaching Award. Mackenzie was the recipient of the Queen Elizabeth II Golden Jubilee Medal (2002) and Diamond Jubilee Medal (2012) for her passionate contribution to the arts in Canada. In 2017, Mackenzie received the Governor General's Awards in Visual and Media Arts.

In several of her large-scale paintings from the early 1990s, Mackenzie layered research notes, annotated maps, archival texts and documentation of her investigations and explorations of geographic regions. Further, Vancouver As the Centre of the World was commissioned for the 2010 Winter Olympic Games. She has held a fascination for research on the brain and neural mapping in relationship to the mapping of our physical environment leading to series such as, 'Houbart's Hope', 'Neurocity', and 'The Structures'. In 2014–2015, Mackenzie exhibited with the iconic historical painter Emily Carr in an exhibition for the Vancouver Art Gallery called Emily Carr and Landon Mackenzie: Wood Chopper and the Monkey. Often her work hovers in both regions of abstract, landscape and representational art.

In 2015, Landon Mackenzie: Parallel Journey: Works on Paper (1975–2015) was curated by Liz Wylie for the Kelowna Art Gallery before embarking on a national tour. As a 40-year retrospective, it was accompanied by a book of the same name published by Black Dog Publishing.

In 2026, Mackenzie's public art project for the City of Toronto at CIBC Square opened to acclaim. Consisting of over 2400 sq ft of back lit glass imagery, the project was supported by Hines and La Caisse corporations. The lobby of the new CIBC Square tower is located at 141 Bay Street joined to Union Station by a new footbridge.

== Selected collections ==
- National Gallery of Canada
- Musée national des beaux-arts du Québec

== Selected awards ==
- Queen Elizabeth II Golden Jubilee Medal 2003
- Canada Council Grant to Established Artists 1998, 1999, 2005
- Canada Council Paris Studio Residency Award 2008
- Ian Wallace Excellence in Teaching Award, 2009
- Queen Elizabeth II Diamond Jubilee Medal, 2012
- Governor General's Award in Visual and Media Arts 2017
