= Yvonne Lammerich =

Canadian visual artist, curator and writer (born 1946)

- Born: 1946 (age 79–80); Germany
- Education: Ontario College of Art (AOCA); Concordia University (MA); Université du Québec à Montréal (PhD)
- Awards: Canada Council Maria Stafford Mid-Career Prize (1996)
- Website: yvonnelammerich.com

Yvonne Lammerich (born 1946) is a Canadian visual artist, curator and writer. Her work, largely in painting and installation, "articulates the simultaneity of experiencing the body's response as we navigate both real and projected space."

== Life and education ==
Yvonne Lammerich was born in Germany in 1946, daughter to Frederic Lammerich and Barbara Dobzinski. She immigrated to Canada in 1959 with her family.

She graduated from the Ontario College of Art, received a MA in art history from Concordia University and earned a PhD from the Université du Québec à Montréal.

Lammerich resides in Prince Edward County, Ontario.

== Career ==
From 1975 to 1976, while living in Bristol, England, Lammerich conducted research at the Brain and Perception Laboratory with Richard Gregory, University of Bristol. She lived and worked in Montreal from 1985 to 2002, before moving back to Toronto. In 1991, she was the artistic director for the Baie Saint Paul International Painting Symposium and was a board member at Gallery Optica from 1986 to 1993. In 1996 she received the Canada Council's Maria Stafford Mid-Career Prize.

She has taught at the York University, OCAD University, the University of Lethbridge and Zayed University in Dubai.

Lammerich has exhibited at the Southern Alberta Art Gallery (2008), the Museum of Contemporary Canadian Art (2010), the University of Toronto Barnicke Gallery (2011) and the Bonavista Biennale (2019).

Lamerich's work Writing to You, a collaboration with Ian Carr-Harris, is part of the City of Vancouver public art collection.
