= Peter Lazarov =

Bulgarian/Dutch artist printmaker (born 1958)

Peter Lazarov (born 1958) is a Bulgarian/Dutch artist printmaker.

== Biography ==
Since 1990 Lazarov has been living in The Netherlands. Almost completely unknown in his home country, Peter Lazarov is one of the very few living artists within the official collection of the Rijksmuseum in Amsterdam, where, amongst others one finds the Night watch by Rembrandt.

Other prestigious collections include Museum Meermanno-Westreenianum, The Hague, Netherlands; Museum of fine arts, Okinawa, Japan; National Library of Congress, Washington DC, USA; Yale University, USA; and the University of British Columbia, Vancouver Canada.

Peter Lazarov, member of the British Society of Wood engravers, is a master of printing techniques, using wood engraving, woodcuts, and lithography, sometimes combined into one print. His expressive style bears the marks of the rich Bulgarian tradition and simultaneously the influences of Dürer, Rembrandt, Escher, or Willem de Kooning.

In 2003, he visited Japan to work with the master paper maker, Sensei Fujimori-san, considered a "National treasure" in Japan. Today Peter Lazarov makes his own papers, using the ancient Japanese techniques. One may consider Lazarov to be the only Bulgarian artist who possesses this knowledge.

He has illustrated numerous fine-press books for such authors as Louis Paul Boon, Atanas Daltchev, Cor Jellema, Kavafis, Emily Dickinson, Charlotte Brontë, Victor Hugo, Archimedes, or Crispin Elsted amongst others.

In 2002 he founded his own private press, PEPELpress, for limited-edition, hand-made books. In 2006 two of his books, notably “Shoji” and "Melancholi...", were chosen amongst the 50 best bibliographical editions in The Netherlands for 2004-2005, Mooi Marginaal. Shoji consists of three Dutch haiku by his son, Teodor, and three wood-engravings by himself.

In 2007 a large exhibition of Peter Lazarov in Shanghai, China, showing 200 engravings was "sold out"—an unseen event for the author.

In October 2008, Peter Lazarov was the centre of the world graphics exhibition in Beijing, China, when he was elected by the Organizational committee of the World Congress of FISAE in Beijing, China, as among the 10 best artists printmakers in the world, working in the field of Ex Libris and small graphic art. It was the first time such an honour was bestowed upon a Bulgarian artist.
