= Anne Meredith Barry =

Canadian visual artist

- Born: August 31, 1932; Toronto, Ontario
- Died: January 23, 2003 (aged 70); St. John's, Newfoundland
- Education: Ontario College of Art
- Known for: painting, printmaking, etching, woodcut, screenprinting, lithography, artist's books
- Awards: honorary doctorate from Memorial University of Newfoundland (1998); Queen's Jubilee Medal for her support of the arts in Newfoundland and Labrador (2003)
- Elected: member in 1995, Royal Canadian Academy of Arts

Anne Meredith Barry RCA (August 31, 1932 – January 23, 2003) was a Canadian visual artist known for her landscapes of Newfoundland and Labrador. Her paintings and prints made use of bold colours and whimsical patterns, occasionally incorporating collage and handwritten text.

== Career ==
Born in Toronto, Barry graduated from the Ontario College of Art (now known as OCAD University) in 1954 and began painting full-time. Her work was included in the City of Montreal Art Exhibition in 1969.

Barry first visited Newfoundland in 1971, when she spent the summer teaching children at Hibb's Cove, Conception Bay, through a residency with the Outport Arts Foundation. In subsequent years, she continued to visit Newfoundland from her home in Toronto. Captivated by the rugged landscape of Newfoundland, she painted, made prints, and taught workshops through St. Michael's Printshop and Memorial University's Extension Service.

In 1986, she and her husband, John, moved permanently to Newfoundland. They purchased a printshop in the community of St. Michael's, on the Avalon Peninsula. Barry continued to live and work as a visual artist in Newfoundland for many years. She died in St. John's in 2003 from complications associated with pancreatic cancer.

== Awards and recognition ==
Barry was elected to the Royal Canadian Academy of Arts in 1995, and received an honorary doctorate from Memorial University of Newfoundland in 1998. In 2003, just two weeks before she died, she was awarded the Queen's Jubilee Medal for her support of the arts in Newfoundland and Labrador. In 2007 her work was the focus of a major retrospective at The Rooms Provincial Art Gallery, titled Anne Meredith Barry: Natural Energies.
