= Gerald Squires =

Canadian artist (1937–2015)

Gerry Squires CM RCA
- Born: Gerald Leopold Squires; November 17, 1937; Change Islands, Newfoundland
- Died: October 3, 2015 (aged 77)
- Education: Danforth Technical School, Ontario College of Art & Design
- Known for: Painting, sculpting, lithography, stained glass art
- Awards: Order of Canada; Queen Elizabeth II Golden Jubilee Award; Ted Drover Award
- Patrons: Mary Queen of the World Church et al
- Website: squiresgallery.com

Gerald Leopold "Gerry" Squires, CM RCA (November 17, 1937 – October 3, 2015) was a Canadian artist. Best known for painting dramatic landscapes in acrylic and oil, Squires also produced major work in sculpture, lithography and stained glass. He was also an accomplished portraitist. Much of his work drew inspiration from the landscape and culture of Newfoundland and Labrador.

== Training and career ==
Born in Change Islands, Newfoundland, Gerald Squires moved with his family to Toronto, Ontario at the age of twelve. In Toronto, he attended Danforth Technical School, where his natural artistic talent was encouraged. He later took night classes at the Ontario College of Art & Design. Upon graduating from Danforth, Squires supported his art practice by apprenticing as a stained glass artist, and later worked as an editorial artist with the Toronto Telegram for several years. He exhibited his work in Toronto in solo shows such as St. Francis of Assisi and Related Subjects, The Canticles of St. John of the Cross, and The Wanderer Series. Squires was also a founding member of the Robert McLaughlin Art Gallery in Oshawa, Ontario.

In 1969, Squires quit his job at the Telegram and returned to Newfoundland. In 1971, he settled in an abandoned lighthouse in Ferryland, where he lived with his wife and two daughters.In Ferryland, Squires was an artist in residence and teacher for Memorial University of Newfoundland, and established a steel sculpture studio, Headland Studios, with fellow artist Stewart Montgomerie. Work from this period includes Studies in Steel, Portraits, and The Ferryland Downs Series.

Squires lived and worked in Holyrood, Newfoundland from 1983 onward. In the early 1980s, he created several major works for Mary Queen of the World Church, a process chronicled in the film The Newfoundland Passion by Arnold Bennett. In 1984, he received the Ted Drover Award for Achievement in the Visual Arts from the Newfoundland and Labrador Arts Council. He was made a member of the Order of Canada in 1999, and in 2003 received the Queen Elizabeth II Golden Jubilee Medal. He was made a member of the Royal Canadian Academy of Arts.

Squires continued to produce paintings, drawings, prints, and sculptures, and exhibits widely. Notable recent shows include Gerald Squires: Journey, a 40-year retrospective at the Art Gallery of Newfoundland and Labrador (1998), and Interior Light at the Emma Butler Gallery (2005).

"I Heard the Birch Tree Whisper in the Night", a one-hour documentary film capturing Squires' life and completion of his final painting, was aired on CBC television in 2017. The film is directed by Newfoundland author and filmmaker, Kenneth J. Harvey.
