= Barb Hunt =

Canadian textile artist

Barb Hunt is a multidisciplinary textile artist from Winnipeg, Manitoba. Her art has contrasted knitting as a warming, protective art, against the violence of war. Through her tactile work, Hunt explores domesticity, mourning rituals, the natural world, and the colour pink.

A feminist and craftivist, Hunt uses materials, processes, and colours traditionally associated with femininity to bring new context and care to objects of war and adds legitimacy to tasks associated with women's work.

== Career ==
A core focus of Hunt's practice has been the devastation of war and creating works from camouflage army uniforms. Hunt's 1998–2010 antipersonnel series documented the proliferation of landmines through hand knitting replicas in various shades of pink yarn. The work draws on the history of knitting as caring for the body and the use of knitting to create bandages for soldiers. In this context knitting becomes a metaphor for recuperation, protection, and healing, creating a contrast between the materials and the destructive subject matter. The work was included in the group exhibition, Museopathy, at the Agnes Etherington Art Centre in Kingston, Ontario, and later in a solo show named antipersonnel at the Art Gallery of Ontario. Her work included in the exhibition Unpacking the Living Room (pieces from two separate series titled antipersonnel and Aprons) serves as a material protest against the use of antipersonnel landmines. As Hunt describes "I use these associations to contradict the abuse of power and the use of violence by transforming a destructive object into one that can do no harm."

In Toll, her 2011 solo show at The Rooms in St. John's, Newfoundland, she created large installations using camouflage fabric as a central theme and material.

Hunt's Mourning series was a textile-based exploration of the relationships between death, mourning, gender and recuperation. In her Steel Dresses series, Hunt made metal dresses from cold-rolled steel sheets to create forms resembling textile patterns as well as nature, and forms traditionally associated with women.

Hunt has had solo exhibitions at the Art Gallery of Ontario, The Rooms Provincial Art Gallery and at Exeter and Bath galleries in the UK. Her work has been included in group exhibitions and biennials both national and international. She has also completed residencies throughout Canada, as well as Paris and Ireland.

Hunt has received several awards including the VANL-CARFAC Endurance Award, The President's Award for Outstanding Research from Memorial University of Newfoundland, and the Canada Council York Wilson Purchase Award.

== Permanent collections ==
Hunt's art is in many major public collections, including:

- Agnes Etherington Art Centre, Canada Council York Wilson Purchase Award, Kingston, ON Canada
- Canada Council Art Bank, Ottawa, ON
- Central Museum of Textiles, Lodz, Poland
- Fondazione Benetton, Italy
- Rooms Provincial Art Gallery, St. John's, NL
- Royal Ontario Museum, Toronto, ON
- Winnipeg Art Gallery.

== Selected bibliography ==
Since 2001, international journals/books that have discussed Hunt's work include:

- Susan Cahill, "The Elsewhere War: Art, Embodiment, and the Spaces of Military Engagement," Journal of Canadian Studies, Spring 2018.
- Black, Anthea and Nicole Burisch. "Craft Hard, Die Free: Radical Curatorial Strategies for Craft in Unruly Spaces." Maria Elena Buszek, ed. Extra/Ordinary: Craft and Contemporary Art. Durham, London: Duke University Press, 2011; and in Glenn Adamson, ed. The Craft Reader. New York: Berg, 2010.
- McElroy, Gil. Built with a String: Barb Hunt and Knitting in Newfoundland and Labrador. Craft Year, 2007. Accessed February 2, 2020.
- Perron, Mirielle. "The Art of Camouflage, A Female Touch: Exploring tactility in the work of Janice Wright Cheney, Barb Hunt and Sarah Maloney." Paula Gustafson, ed. Craft Perception and Practice 3. Vancouver: Ronsdale Press, 2008.
- Kirsty Robertson, "Capturing the Movement: Affect, Anti-War Art and Activism." Afterimage: The Journal of Media Arts and Cultural Criticism, Vol. 34, No. 6, Fall 2006, 27–30.
- Magliaro, Joseph and Shu Hung, eds. By Hand: The Use of Craft in Contemporary Art. New York: Princeton Architectural Press, 2006.
- Wignall, Alice. "This Mortal Toil." The Guardian. October 4, 2005.
