= Jordan Bennett (artist) =

Canadian multi-disciplinary artist

- Born: 1986 (age 39–40)
- Known for: painter, sculptor, video artist, installation and sound artist, tattoo artist
- Notable work: Turning Tables (2010), jilaqami’g no’shoe (2009)
- Spouse: Amy Malbeuf (artist)
- Awards: Sobey Art Award Nominee (2015, 2016), Representative for Newfoundland and Labrador in the 2015 Venice Biennale, Hnatyshan Foundation REVEAL Award, 2014 Newfoundland and Labrador Arts Council's Artist of the Year, Blouin ARTINFO's Top 30 under 30 in Canada (2014)
- Website: https://www.jordanbennett.ca

Jordan Bennett (born 1986) is a Canadian multi-disciplinary artist and member of the Qalipu First Nation from Stephenville Crossing, Newfoundland, also known as Ktaqamkuk. He is married to Métis visual artist Amy Malbeuf.

Bennett works predominantly with painting, silkscreening, sculpture, video, installation and sound. Since 2008, Bennett has shown his work both nationally and internationally in over 75 exhibitions, notably Beat Nation: Art, Hip Hop and Aboriginal Culture, an exhibition co-curated by Kathleen Ritter and Tania Willard that toured nationally in Canada from 2012–2014.

== Education ==
Bennett earned a Bachelor of Fine Arts Degree at Grenfell Campus in Corner Brook, Newfoundland in 2008. He then went on to receive a Masters of Fine Arts (MFA) Degree at the University of British Columbia Okanagan in Kelowna, British Columbia in 2016. The focus of Bennett's MFA was to "re-imagin[e] the traditional art forms of the Beothuk and Mi’kmaq into a contemporary art discourse." Bennett was also a participant at the Earthline Tattoo Training Residency in 2016. He is a member of the Qalipu First Nation.

== Themes ==
Bennett's work tends towards interactive and multi-sensory as he incorporates multiple forms of media into his work to create immersive environments for the viewer. These interactive works incorporate a broad range of materials. Main sources of inspiration come from his interactions with Mi'kmaq and Beothuk porcupine quill designs, baskets, beadwork, clothing, and petroglyphs. Bennett's work engages with themes of land, language, family history, and colonial misinterpretations of Indigenous history and stereotypes in Canada.

Bennett's artwork often references urban First Nations youth and culture. jilaqami’g no’shoe, created in 2009, is a skateboard carved into a snowshoe, referencing Indigenous skater culture and traditional practices.

In another notable work, Turning Tables (2010), shown in the touring exhibition Beat Nation: Art, Hip Hop and Aboriginal Culture, is a handcrafted mixing table made out of various woods. The record needle plays the sound of the tree's rights. In this work Bennett asserts the continuation of Traditional Knowledge in a digital era.

Bennett's focus within his MFA looked at Mi’kmaq and Beothuk visual culture of Ktaqamkuk, which drew inspiration from the drawings of Shanawdithit, the last known living member of the Beothuk peoples.

He also participates in a collaboration with Amy Malbeuf under the moniker, Neon Kokhom, which is meant to "poke fun at indigenous stereotyping and its role in Canada's lucrative souvenir industry". This collaboration uses humour to address Indigenous misrepresentation

== Career ==
=== Earthline Tattoo ===
After completing a tattoo apprenticeship with Nlaka'pamux artist Dion Kaszas, Bennet, Métis visual artist Amy Malbeuf and Kaszas co-founded an Indigenous tattoo collective and residency called Earthline Tattoo, which focuses on the resurgence of Indigenous cultural tattoo practices in Canada. In 2016, they conducted a training residency in which six Indigenous artists were invited to learn tattooing practices connected to Indigenous Traditions. The residency was supported, in part, by the Initiative for Indigenous Futures and hosted by the Faculty of Creative and Critical Studies, University of British Columbia Okanagan.

=== Solo exhibitions ===
==== 2012–2019 ====
- Ketu' elmita'jik, Art Gallery of Nova Scotia, Halifax, NS (2018-2019)
- Wije'wi (Come with me), Estevan Art Gallery, Estevan SK (2018)
- Wije'wi (Come with me), Grenfell Art Gallery, Corner Brook, NL (2017)
- Herd:Heard, Regart, Manif 8-La Biennale Quebec, Quebec City. (2017)
- Mniku, Vernon Public Art Gallery, Vernon, BC (2016)
- Billy Jacking, Gallery 2, Grand Forks, BC (2015)
- Ice Fishing, Trinity Square Video, Toronto, ON (2014)
- Guidelines-The Basket Ladies, Grenfell Art Gallery, Corner Brook, NL (2014)
- Horseback or Foot: Flattened and Confused, Project Space Gallery, RMIT, Melbourne, AUS. (As Neon Kohkom, with Amy Malbeuf) (2014)
- Jordan Bennett- Shamans and Superheros, SNAP Gallery, Edmonton, AB (2013)

=== Selected group exhibitions ===
==== 2010–2017 ====
- Sans reserve, Musée d'Art Contemporain du Val-de-Marne, Paris, FR (2017)
- A Going Concern: Contemporary Textiles And Everyday Politics In Newfoundland And Labrador, The Rooms, St.Johns, NL (2017)
- Mi’kmaq Word of the Day, Eastern Edge Art Gallery, St.John’s, NL (2017)
- Transformer: Native art in light and sound, National Museum of the American Indian, Smithsonian, NYC (2017)
- ArtSci, Cape Breton University Art Gallery, Sydney, NS (2017)
- Art in the Tunnels-From here to there: then and now, Ottawa, ON (2017)
- Coyote School, The McMaster Museum of Art, Hamilton, ON (2017)
- Insurgence/Resurgence, Winnipeg Art Gallery, MB (2017)
- Insurgence/Resurgence, Winnipeg Art Gallery, MB (As Earthline Tattoo Collective) (2017)
- Samqwan-Nipiy (with Lori Blondeau), Charlottetown, PEI Flotilla presented by AKA Artist Run Centre (2017)
- Museum of Capitalism, Oakland, California (2017)
- Canadian Imago Mundi, Palazzo Loredan, Campo Santo Stefano, Venice Italy (2017)
- Shared Lands, Action Art Actuel, Musée des Abénakis, Odanak, QC. (2017)
- Boarder X, The Winnipeg Art Gallery, MB (2016)
- If We Never Met, Pataka Museum, Porirua City, NZ (2016)
- Convergence: space and time in contemporary Indigenous art in Canada, Canadian Embassy, Ottawa, ON (2016)
- Aja-sit, Campbell River Art Gallery, BC (2016)
- With Secrecy and Despatch, Campbelltown Art Centre, Campbelltown, NSW, AUS (2016)
- Culture Shift- Aboriginal Art Biennale, Art Mur, Montreal, QC (As Neon Kohkom) (2016)
- The Fifth World, Kitchener-Waterloo Art Gallery, Kitchener, ON (2016)
- Shared Lands, Toured Nationally (2013-2016)
- Under the Surface: 2015 Venice Biennale, Galleria Ca’ Rezzonico, Venice, Italy (2015)
- Hip-Hop: From the Bronx to the Arab Streets, Arab World Institute, Paris, France (2015)
- The Fifth World- TRIBE Inc, Mendel Art Gallery, Saskatoon, SK (2015)
- Atlantic Canada Biennale, McCain Art Gallery, Florenceville-Bristol, NB (2015)
- Decolonize Me- Toured Nationally (2011-2015)
- Noongwa (Now/Today), Gallery 101, Ottawa, ON (2014)
- Storytelling: The Contemporary Native Art Biennial, 2nd Edition: Art Mur, Montreal, QC (2014)
- Changing Hands: Art Without Reservation Toured Nationally (2012-2014)
- Changing Tides: Contemporary Art in Newfoundland and Labrador, McMichael Art Gallery. Kleinburg, ON (2014)
- Beat Nation: Art, Hip-Hop and Aboriginal Culture, Dalhousie Art Gallery and St. Mary’s University Art Gallery, Halifax, NS; Mackenzie Art Gallery, Regina, SK (2012- 2014)
- Bury My Art, Wounded Knee-Pacific Northwest College of Art, Portland, OR (2013)
- Aboriginal Voice, Galerie d'art Louise et Reuben-Cohen, Moncton, NB (2013)
- WANDERLUST, Textile Museum of Canada, Toronto, ON (2012)
- 25 for 25, The Rooms, St.Johns, NL (2012)
- L’nuk (with Ursula A. Johnson): Anna Leonowens Art Gallery, Halifax, NS (2010-2012)
- Landwash Exhibition-Contemporary Newfoundland Art- Esplande Art Gallery, Medicine Hat, AB (2012)
- Contrary Projects in Venice: An Aboriginal Art Intervention at the Venice Biennale 2011, Venice, Italy (2011)
- 50-500 Members Show, Urban Shaman Gallery, Winnipeg, MB (2011)
- Problem Child -Group Exhibition, The Rooms, St.Johns, NL (2011)
- ACTING-out, Claiming Space: Aboriginal Performance Art Series, Modern Fuel Artist Run Centre, Kingston, OM. (2011)
- RE:counting coup, A Space Gallery, Toronto, On (2010)
- Red Runners, The new objectification of Native Art and Identity- Group Exhibition, Well and Good Gallery, Toronto, ON (2010)
- Truth and Reconciliation Commission of Canada, TRC, The Forks Plaza, Winnipeg, MB (2010)
- The 1 of 1 Project, Sk8 Skates, Winnipeg, MB (2010)

2006–2009

- Vancouver 2010 Aboriginal Art Exhibition, Vancouver Convention Centre, Vancouver, BC
- All Nighters, Graduate Show, Sir Wilfred Grenfell College Art Gallery, Corner Brook, NL
- Defining Moments, Yukon Arts Centre, Whitehorse, Yukon.
- Art in a Suitcase, Relais de la Baie, Noyelle, France.
- Harlow Campus Exhibition, Harlow Campus Trust, Old Harlow, Essex, England.

=== Selected screenings ===
- Ice Fishing, (Film World premiere) imagineNATIVE Film and Media Arts Festival- Toronto, ON (2015)
- Guidelines, The Basket Ladies (Film World premiere) imagineNATIVE Film and Media Arts Festival- Toronto, ON (2013)

=== Selected awards and grants ===
- Reveal Award, Hnatyshan Foundation, 2017
- Aboriginal Peoples Collaborative Exchange, Canada Council for the Arts, 2017
- Aboriginal/Inuit Traditional Visual Art Forms Grant, Canada Council for the Arts, 2017
- Sobey Art Award- Long list, 2016
- Canada Graduate Scholarships, Master’s (CGS M), Social Sciences and Humanities Research Council, 2015
- Aboriginal Graduate Scholarship, University of British Columbia Okanagan, 2015
- Sobey Art Award, Long list, 2015
- Aboriginal Graduate Scholarship, University of British Columbia Okanagan, 2014
- Faculty of Creative and Critical Studies Graduate Scholarship, 2014
- University of British Columbia Okanagan Graduate Fellowship, 2014
- Indspire Award, Graduate Studies, 2014
- ARTINFO 30 under 30, Blouin Artinfo Canada, 2014
- Artist of the Year Award, Newfoundland And Labrador Arts Council, 2014
- National Film Board of Canada/imagineNATIVE Interactive Digital Project 2014
- Hnatyshyn Foundation: Charles Pacther Prize for Emerging Artists, 2012
- Emerging Artist of the Year Award, Newfoundland and Labrador Arts Council, 2012
- Large Year Award, Excellence in Visual Arts Newfoundland, 2012
- Production Grant, Newfoundland and Labrador Arts Council., 2014, 2011, 2009
- Professional Artist Production Grant, Canada Council for the Arts, 2011
- Emerging Artist of the Year Award, Corner Brook Sustainability Awards, 2011
- Memorial University Medallion for Academic Excellence in Visual Arts, 2008
