= The Rooms =

Museum and art gallery in St. John's, Newfoundland

- Established: June 29, 2005; 21 years ago
- Location: 9 Bonaventure Avenue; St. John's, Newfoundland and Labrador; A1C 5P9
- Coordinates: 47°33′58.45″N 52°42′42.62″W
- Type: Art Gallery, the Provincial Archives and the Provincial Museum.
- Visitors: 87,083 (2017)
- Website: www.therooms.ca

National Historic Site of Canada
- Official name: Fort Townshend National Historic Site of Canada
- Designated: 1951

The Rooms is a cultural facility in St. John's, Newfoundland and Labrador, Canada. The facility opened on June 29, 2005 and houses the Art Gallery of Newfoundland and Labrador, the Provincial Archives of Newfoundland and Labrador and the Provincial Museum of Newfoundland and Labrador.

The facility was constructed on a hill overlooking the port city, at a historic location once occupied by Fort Townshend.

== History ==
=== Origins of the name ===
The building's name, as well as its architecture, is a reference to the simple gable-roofed sheds (called "fishing rooms") that were once so common at the waterline in Newfoundland fishing villages.

=== Fort Townshend ===
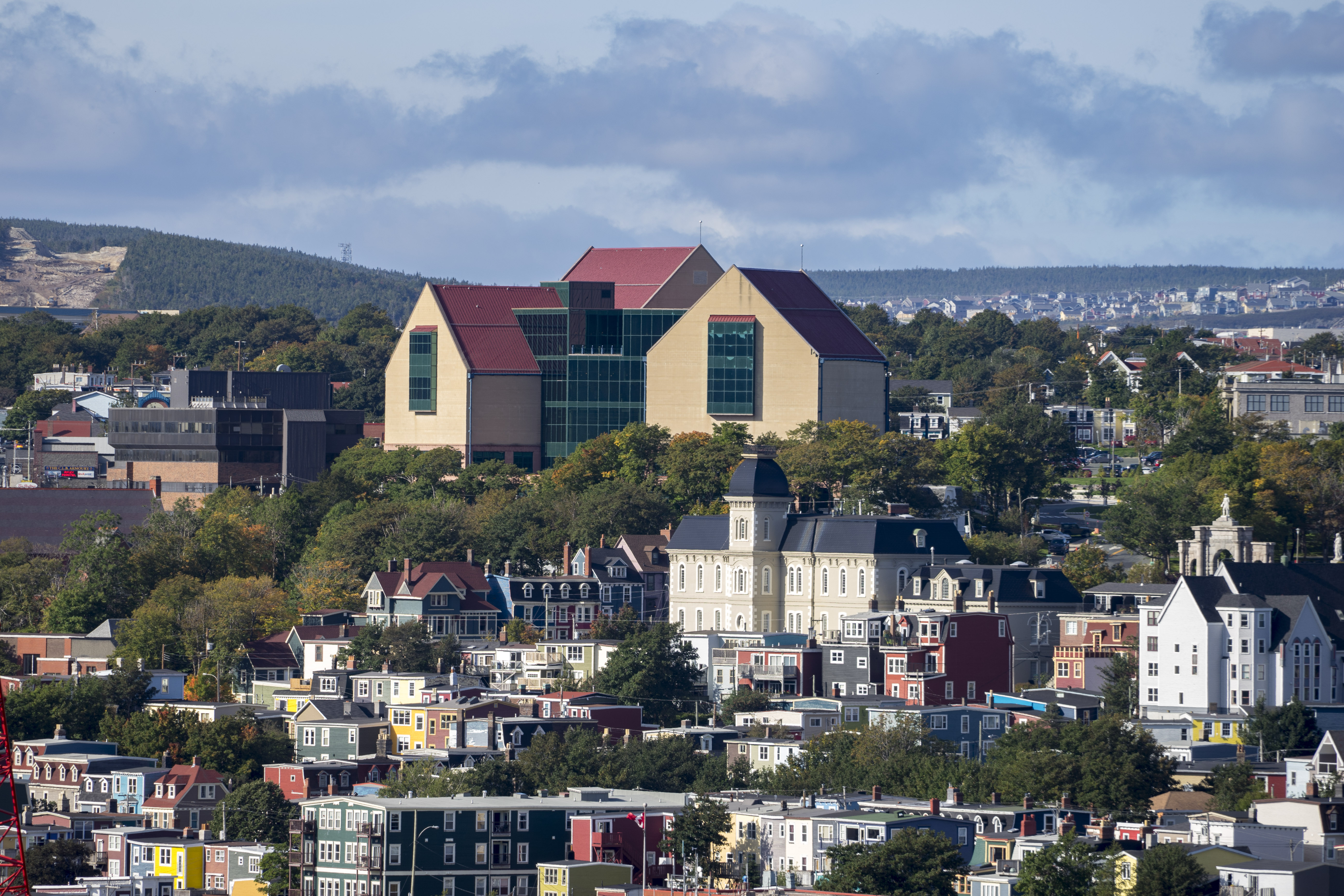
The Rooms, as viewed from Signal Hill

During the planning and construction of the building much opposition was raised by archaeologists and historians because of its location. Previously on the same strategic spot of land was located Fort Townshend, an 18th-century military fort, that was eventually buried under ground. The great star-shaped citadel, one of the largest British fortifications in North America at the time, was built to defend Britain's fishing interests. With the withdrawal of the imperial garrison in 1870, the site became the home of the Royal Newfoundland Constabulary and, later, the St. John's Fire Department.

The site was designated a National Historic Site of Canada in 1951.

On-site interpretation allows visitors to explore this historic past. Careful research and documentation before construction ensured that future study of the site is possible.

==== Outdoor exhibit ====
In March 2013, The Rooms Corporation announced it would be developing an outdoor space to improve access and safety, and to commemorate the history of Fort Townshend. The outline of the Fort was marked with granite pavers along a lit pathway, as an extension of the Grand Concourse. Plans to excavate archaeological remains of Fort Townshend, which are largely located under the building, were not defined in the scope of the project. The outdoor space was completed by the Grand Concourse Authority in two phases between 2013 and 2014.

== Cultural facilities ==
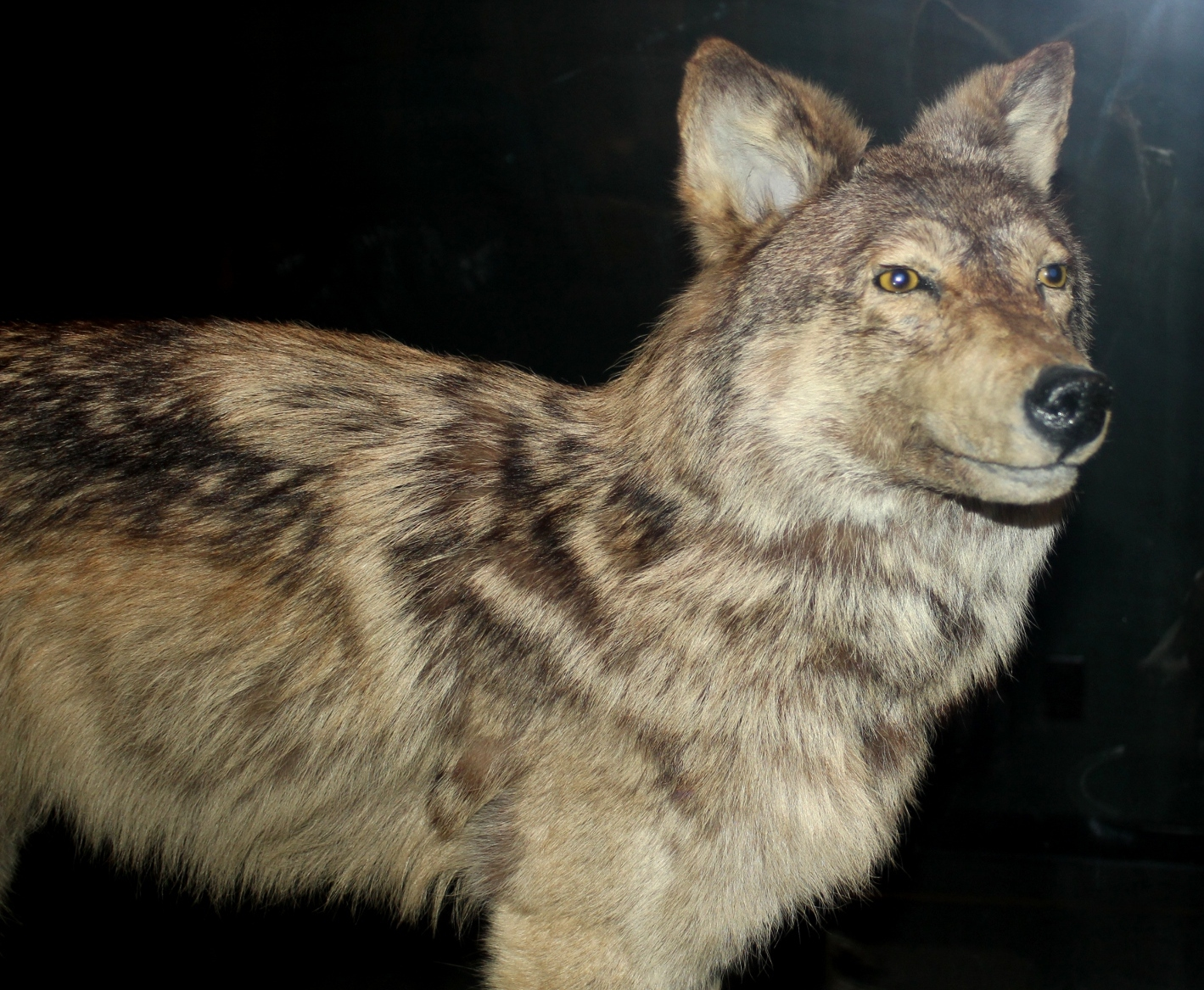
A stuffed Newfoundland wolf in the museum division of The Rooms

The facility was officially opened on June 29, 2005. The building offers a panoramic view of downtown St. John's and its architecture, St. John's Harbour, The Narrows and Signal Hill. The Rooms operates as the provincial archives, art gallery, and museum. The archives, art gallery, and museum serve as separate departments of The Rooms.

=== Archives ===
Located on the third floor of The Rooms, the mandate of Archives Division is to preserve records of the Government of Newfoundland and Labrador which have enduring value, whether legal, fiscal, evidential or for research purposes. The Archives also collects documents and other records from private sources if they are deemed to have value to the history of the province.

The Archives database can be accessed here.

=== Art Gallery ===
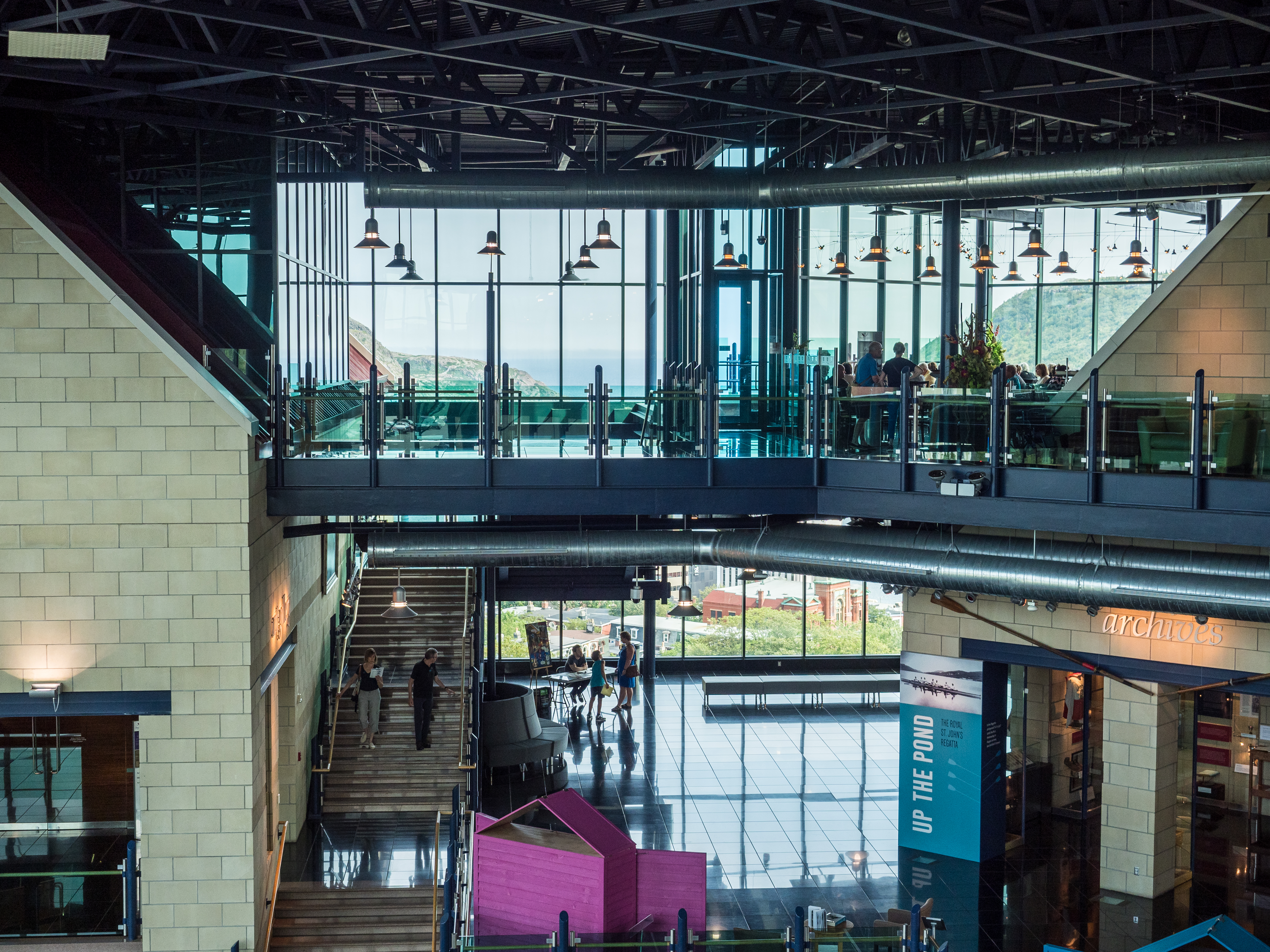
Display and circulation spaces

The Rooms Provincial Art Gallery is the premiere public gallery in the province dedicated to developing and exhibiting contemporary art, with 10,000 square feet of space for permanent collections and travelling exhibits. Since opening in 2005, the gallery has produced an average of 15 exhibitions annually; ranging from new-media installations to Renaissance printmaking. The gallery presents new work from across Canada and the world, with a special (though not exclusive) focus on artists working in Newfoundland and Labrador.

The gallery manages several collections, known together as the "Permanent Collections": Memorial University of Newfoundland; the J. K. Pratt Memorial Collection; The Rooms Collection; and the Art Procurement Collection of the Government of Newfoundland and Labrador (Provincial Art Bank). Altogether, they comprise over 7,000 works of art, primarily post-1960 Canadian art. Emphasis is placed on art of Newfoundland and Labrador, with major holdings of such artists as Christopher Pratt, Mary Pratt, Gerald Squires, David Blackwood, Reginald Shepherd, Helen Parsons Shepherd, Don Wright and Anne Meredith Barry.

=== Museum ===
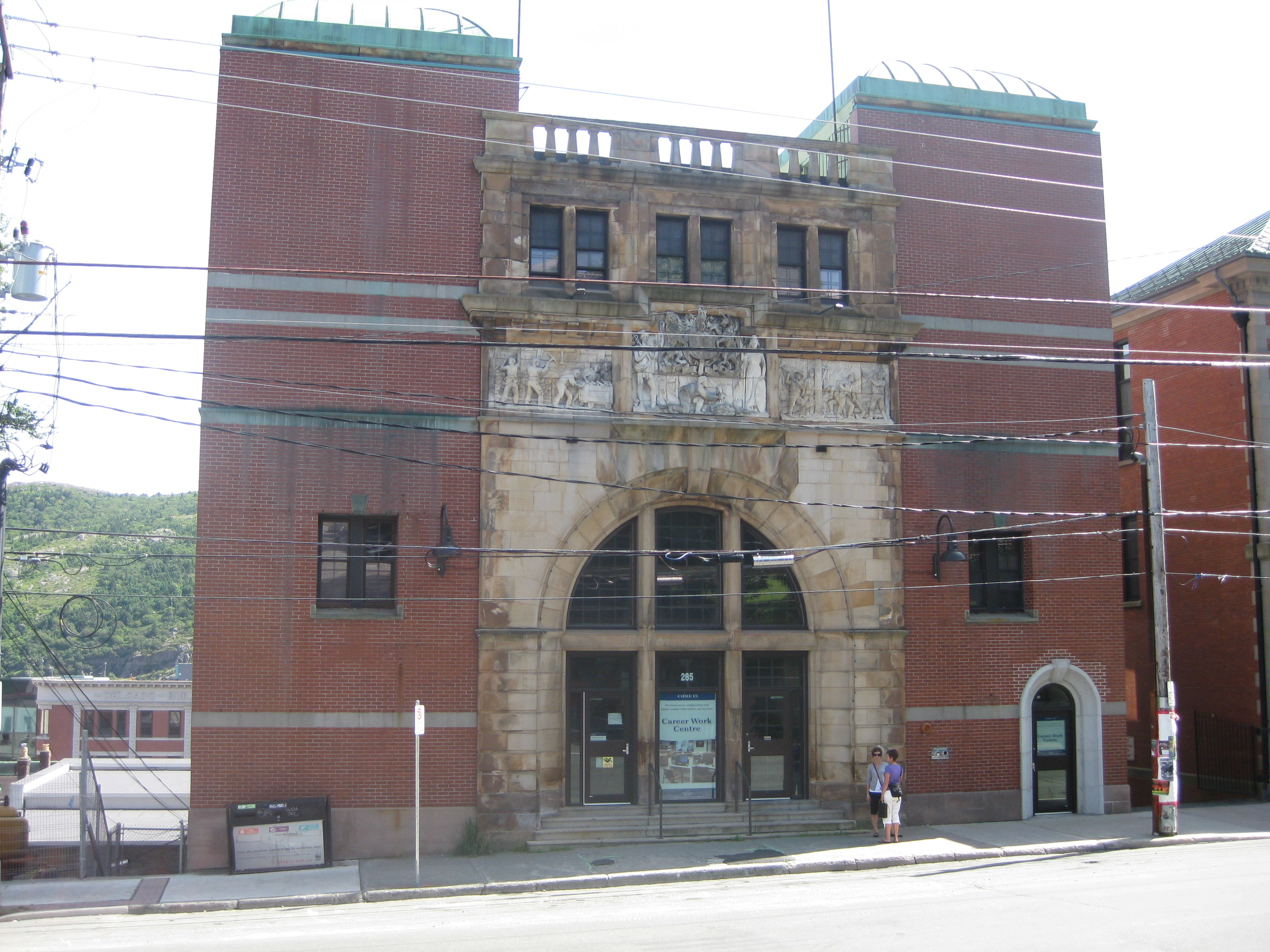
Original Newfoundland Museum building at 285 Duckworth Street

The Provincial Museum focuses on the natural and cultural history of Newfoundland and Labrador. Exhibits include dioramas of the animal and plant life of the tundra and bog, mounted bird displays, and the aboriginal people who lived in the area. Other displays include the city's British military history, the Royal Newfoundland Constabulary, and the culture and contributions of the area's Irish fishermen. Changing exhibits focus on other aspects of the province's history, natural history and culture.

The original Newfoundland Museum was located in a large Classical Revival brick and sandstone building at 285 Duckworth Street in downtown St. John's. The building is designated by the Heritage Foundation of Newfoundland and Labrador as a municipal heritage structure because it has aesthetic, historic and cultural values.

== Location ==
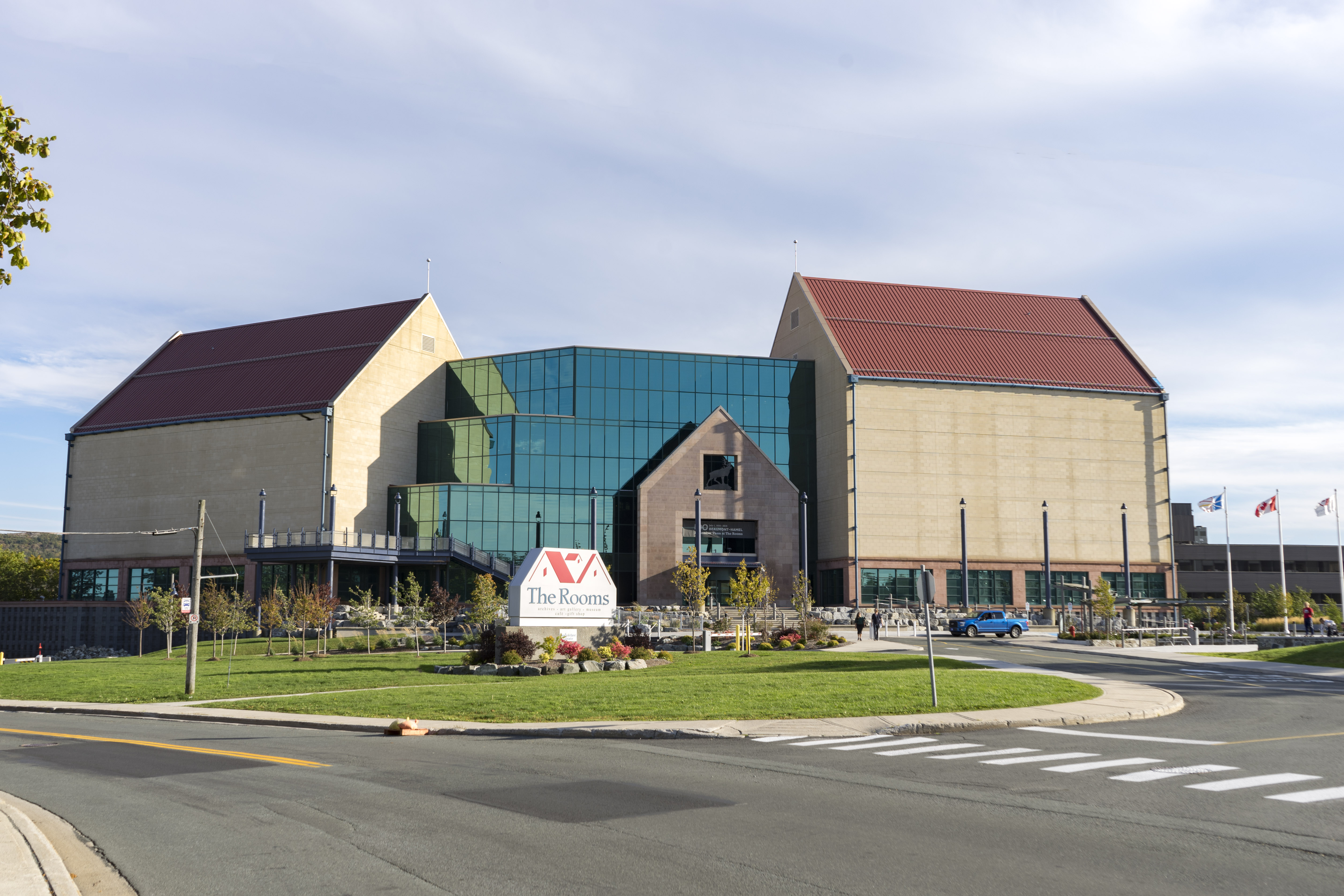
The Rooms (north face), St. John's, Newfoundland

The address of The Rooms is 9 Bonaventure Avenue in St. John's, Newfoundland and Labrador.

== Affiliations ==
The Museum is affiliated with: CMA, CHIN, and Virtual Museum of Canada.
