= RBC Canadian Painting Competition =

Open competition for emerging Canadian artists

- Description: Competition for emerging Canadian painters
- Sponsored by: Canadian Art Foundation
- Country: Canada
- Presented by: Royal Bank of Canada (RBC)

The RBC Canadian Painting Competition was an open competition for emerging Canadian artists that was established in 1999. The RBC Canadian Painting Competition is supported by the Canadian Art Foundation, the publisher of Canadian Art (magazine). Initially naming three regional winners, since 2004 there were one national winner and two honourable mentions. The first two competitions had only winner and runner-up. The competition had 15 finalists, five from three regions in Canada, Eastern Canada (Quebec, Nova Scotia, New Brunswick, PEI, Newfoundland and Labrador), Central Canada (Ontario), Western Canada (Manitoba, Saskatchewan, Alberta, British Columbia, Yukon, Northwest Territories, Nunavut). Three regional juries convened to determine one national winner and two honourable mentions from the 15 finalists. The national winner received a purchase prize of $25,000, the two honourable mentions each received $15,000 and the remaining 12 finalists receive $2,500 each. The winning work and the honourable mentions became part of the RBC Corporate Art Collection which holds more than 4,500 works. In 2016, 586 works were submitted. In 2008 an exhibition at the National Gallery of Canada in Ottawa and the Musée d'art contemporain de Montréal provided an overview of the first ten years of the competition. The RBC concluded the RBC Canadian Painting Competition in 2019.

== 1999 ==
Canadian Emerging Artist Prize

- Winner: Jennifer Walton
- Runner-up: Jeff Willmore

=== Jury ===
- Bill Huffman
- James Patten

== 2000 ==
Canadian Emerging Artist Prize

- Winner: Matthew Carver
- Runner-up: Catherine Beaudette

=== Jury ===
- Andrea Bolley
- Gary Michael Dault
- Bill Huffman
- David P. Solcox
- Carl Skelton

In 2001 the prize was renamed to RBC Canadian Painting Competition, and three regional winners were selected.

== 2001 ==
=== Finalists ===
==== Western ====
- Brigitte Dion
- Kristina Kudryk
- Sharron Labatt
- Gwenessa Lam
- Ben Reeves (Regional Winner)

==== Central ====
- Mona Shahid
- Patrice Stanley
- Marian Wihak
- Regina Williams (Regional Winner)
- Shaan Syed (finalist 2003, 2004)

==== Eastern ====
- Reneé Duval
- Eric Le Ménédeu (Regional Winner)
- Joanne Poirier
- Fionnuala Reynolds
- Joseph Siddiqi

=== Jury ===
==== Western ====
- Robin Laurence
- Tracey Lawrence (gallerist)
- Christina Ritchie

==== Central ====
- Gillian MacKay
- Aaron Milrad
- Pari Nadimi

==== Eastern ====
- Alex Colville
- Jerry Ferguson
- Jan Peacock

== 2002 ==
=== Finalists ===
==== Western ====
- Chris Bennet† (Regional Winner)
- Brigitte Dion
- Holger Kalberg (finalist 2005 and jury 2013)
- Séamus Kealy
- Bernadette Phan

==== Central ====
- Melissa Doherty
- Danny Hussey
- JJ Lee (Regional Winner)
- Mary McKenzie
- Kelly Palmer

==== Eastern ====
- Carmelo Blandino
- Dennis Eksted (Regional Winner)
- Camille Girard-Ruel
- Asa Johnna Westin

=== Jury ===
==== Western ====
- Chris Cran
- Catherine Crowston
- Mary Scott

==== Central ====
- Eliza Griffiths
- Leo Kamen
- Kitty Scott

==== Eastern ====
- Stéphane Aquin
- Roger Bellemare
- Janet Werner

== 2003 ==
=== Finalists ===
==== Western ====
- Chris Dorosz (Regional winner)
- July Duschenes
- Cliff Eyland
- Val Nelson
- Jeff Tutt

==== Central ====
- Martin Bennett
- Jordan Broadworth
- Chris Rogers (Regional winner)
- Shaan Syed (finalist 2001, 2004)
- Pearl Van Geest

==== Eastern ====
- Martin Brouillette
- Peter Dykhuis (Regional winner)
- Caroline Gagnon
- Robert Truszkowski
- Marilyn McAvoy

=== Jury ===
==== Western ====
- Bob Boyer
- Wanda Koop
- Paul Kuhn

==== Central ====
- Robin Metcalfe
- Sarah Milroy
- Kim Moodie
- Joanne Tod

==== Eastern ====
- Jocelyne Aumon
- Ingrid Jenkner
- Jeffrey Spalding

Revised in 2004 to name five finalists per region, one national winner and two regional winners.

== 2004 ==
=== Finalists ===
==== Western ====
- Monique Blom
- John Eisler
- Mark Mullin
- Jim Park
- Brad Phillips (Regional winner)

==== Central ====
- Andrew Morrow
- Soheila Esfahani
- Alexander Irving
- Dionne Simpson (National Winner)
- Shaan Syed (finalist 2001, 2003)

==== Eastern ====
- Adele Chong
- Jennifer Dorner
- Patrick Lundeen
- Andrea Mortson
- Laurel Smith (Regional winner)

=== Jury ===
==== Western ====
- Kent Archer, director and curator, Kenderdine Art Gallery Saskatoon, SK
- Riko Nakasone
- Jane Ash Poitras

==== Central ====
- Jan Allen
- Will Gorlitz
- Olga Korper

==== Eastern ====
- Pierre Dorion (jury 2008)
- Gemey Kelly
- Gordon Laurin

== 2005 ==
=== Finalists ===
==== Western ====
- Chris Millar (finalist 2007)
- Matthew Brown
- Holger Kalberg (jury 2013)
- Krisdy Shindler
- Étienne Zack (National winner, jury 2009)

==== Central ====
- Chris Down
- Jason Gringler
- Meghan McKnight
- Kristine Moran (Regional winner)
- Nick Ostoff

==== Eastern ====
- Paul Berhardt
- Yang Hong
- Chris Kline
- Wil Murray
- Mathew Reichertz (Regional winner)

=== Jury ===
==== Western ====
- Lisa Baldissera
- Yves Trépanier
- Landon MacKenzie

==== Central ====
- Shirley Madill
- Linda Book
- Ben Reeves

==== Eastern ====
- Marc Mayer
- René Blouin
- Alex Livingston

== 2006 ==
=== Finalists ===
==== Western ====
- Abbas Akhavan
- Matthew Brown (Regional Winner)
- Dave & Jenn
- Holger Kalberg (jury 2015)
- Mélanie Rocan Honourable mention

==== Central ====
- Adam Brickell (Regional winner)
- Kim Dorland
- Martin Golland (finalist 2008, 2009)
- Dax Morrison
- Fançois Xavier Saint-Pierre

==== Eastern ====
- Nicolas Grenier
- Dil Hildebrand (National Winner)
- Jonathan Johnson
- Daniel Langevin
- Luce Meunier

=== Jury ===
==== Western ====
- Wayne Baerwaldt
- Eleanor Bond
- Andy Sylvester

==== Central ====
- John Brown
- Barbara Fischer
- Patrizia Libralato

==== Eastern ====
- Shauna McCabe
- Lilian Rodriguez
- Eric Simon

Naming one national winner and two honourable mentions rather than regional winners started in 2007

== 2007 ==
=== Finalists ===
==== Western ====
- Eli Bornowsky (finalist 2008, 2010)
- Arabella Campbell (National Winner)
- Angus Ferguson
- Saun Morin
- Chris Millar (Honourable mention, finalist 2005)

==== Central ====
- Melanie Authier (honourable mention)
- Kim Dorland
- Jennifer Lefort
- Anders Oinonen
- Ben Pinkney

==== Eastern ====
- Elizabeth Grant
- Nam Nguyen
- Aleksandra Rdest
- Mélanie Rocan
- Justin Stephens

=== Jury ===
==== Western ====
- Paul Butler
- Ron Moppett
- Reid Sheir

==== Central ====
- John Hartman
- Ben Portis
- Mary Sue Rankin

==== Eastern ====
- Peter Dykhuis
- Pierre-François Ouelette
- Michele Thériault

== 2008 ==
=== Finalists ===
==== Western ====
- Eli Bornowsky (finalist 2007, 2010)
- Andrew Dadson
- Jeremy Hof (National winner)
- Collin Johanson
- Lorenzo Pepito

==== Central ====
- Martin Golland (finalist 2006)
- Sarah Jane Gorliz
- Amanda Reeves (Honourable mention)
- Drew Simpson
- Emmy Skensved

==== Eastern ====
- Patrick Howlett
- Rick Leong
- Wil Murray (Honourable Mention, Finalist 2005)
- Jeanie Riddle
- Justin Stephens

=== Jury ===
==== Western ====
- Neil Campbell
- Monte Clarke
- Kitty Scott

==== Central ====
- Jessica Bradley
- James Lahey
- David Liss

==== Eastern ====
- James Baird
- Loise Déry
- Pierre Dorion (jury 2004)

== 2009 ==
=== Finalists ===
==== Western Canada ====
- Noah Becker – Victoria
- Brenda Draney (National winner) – Vancouver, BC for Aim is Important
- Dave & Jenn – Calgary
- Ryan Peter – Vancouver
- Joseph Tisiga – Whitehorse

==== Central Canada ====
- Sarah Cale – Toronto
- Janice Colbert – Toronto
- Scott Everingham – Toronto
- Martin Golland (Honourable mention, finalist 2006, 2008) – Toronto, ON for Residential Night Vulture
- Sasha Pierce (Honourable mention) – Toronto, ON Brown

==== Eastern Canada ====
- Julie Beugin – Montreal
- Anthony Burnham – Montreal
- Pierre Durette – Montreal
- Daniel Hutchinson – Halifax
- Nathalie Thibault – Quebec

=== Jury ===
==== Western ====
- Ken Lum, Artist, Vancouver
- Nancy Tousley, Senior Art Writer, Calgary Herald
- Kathleen Ritter, Assistant Curator, Vancouver Art Gallery

==== Central ====
- Benjamin Diaz, Director, Diaz Contemporary, Toronto
- Josée Drouin-Brisebois, Curator, Contemporary Art, National Gallery of Canada
- John Kissick, Artist & Director, School of Fine Art and Music, University of Guelph

==== Eastern ====
- Victoria Page, Owner, Gallery Page and Strange, Halifax
- Nathalie de Blois, Curator of Contemporary Art, Musée national des beaux-arts du Québec
- Etienne Zack, (winner 2005) Artist, Montreal

== 2010 ==
=== Finalists ===
==== Western ====
- Eli Bornowsky (finalist 2007, 2008, jury 2015) – Vancouver
- Aaron Carpenter – Vancouver
- Megan Hepburn – Vancouver
- Laura Piasta – Coquitlam
- Melanie Rocan – Winnipeg

==== Central ====
- Sarah Cale – Toronto
- Scott Everingham – Toronto
- Jon Reed (Honourable mention) – Toronto, ON for Stato di Impotenza
- Mark Stebbins (Honourable mention) – Toronto, ON for Data Centers
- Beth Stuart (finalist 2011, jury 2016) – Toronto

==== Eastern ====
- Hugo Bergeron – Montreal
- Scott Bertram – Halifax
- Benjamin Klein – Montreal
- Alexis Lavoie (National Winner) – Montreal, QC for Restants
- Rick Leong – Montreal

=== Jury ===
==== Western ====
- Renée Van Halm, Vancouver artist
- Jennifer Papararo, curator at the Contemporary Art Gallery in Vancouver
- Mary Reid, curator of contemporary art and photography at the Winnipeg Art Gallery.

==== Central ====
- Joe Friday, Ottawa collector
- Joanne Tod, Toronto artist
- Michael Gibson, director of Michael Gibson Gallery, London, ON

==== Eastern ====
- Mathew Reichertz, artist, Halifax
- Simon Blais, owner Galerie Simon Blais, Montreal
- Paulette Gagnon, director of the Musée d’art contemporain de Montréal

== 2011 ==
=== Finalists ===
==== Western Canada ====
- Rebecca Brewer (National Winner) – Vancouver, BC for Beuys painting
- Thomas Chisholm – Victoria, BC
- Bitsy Knox – Vancouver, BC
- Deirdre McAdams (Honourable Mention) – Vancouver, BC for Blotto
- Krisjanis Katkins-Gorsline – Winnipeg, MB

==== Central Canada ====
- Jessica Groome – Guelph, ON
- Tristram Lansdowne – Toronto, ON
- Daniel Hutchinson – Toronto, ON
- Kim Neudorf – London, ON
- Beth Stuart (Honourable mention, finalist 2010, jury 2016) – Toronto, ON for 02, from Doppelbanger series

==== Eastern Canada ====
- Julie Trudel – Montreal, PQ
- Amy Schissel – Gatineau, PQ
- Jared Peters – Saint John, NB
- Ianick Raymond – Montreal, PQ
- Adam Gunn – Halifax, NS (2013 finalist)

=== Jury ===
==== Western ====
- Elizabeth McIntosh, Senior Artist and Associate Professor, Emily Carr University, Vancouver
- Bruce Grenville, Senior Curator, Vancouver Art Gallery, Vancouver
- Diana Sherlock, Curator & Visual Arts Writer, Calgary

==== Central ====
- Elizabeth Smith, Executive Director of Curatorial Affairs, Art Gallery of Ontario, Toronto
- Christopher Cutts, Director, Christopher Cutts Gallery, Toronto
- Patrick Howlett, (finalist 2008) Senior Artist, London

==== Eastern ====
- Donald Browne, Director, Galerie Donald Browne, Montreal
- Suzanne Funnell, Associate Professor, NSCAD University, Halifax
- Francois LeTourneux, Associate Curator, Musée d’art contemporain de Montréal, Montreal

== 2012 ==
=== Finalists ===
- Betino Assa – Montreal, QC
- Ahbyah Baker – Vancouver
- Thomas Chisholm – Victoria
- Jordy Hamilton – Vancouver
- Andrea Kastner – Edmonton
- Katie Lyle (Honourable mention) – Vancouver, BC for White Night

==== Central ====
- Colin Muir Dorward – Ottawa
- Aleksander Hardashnakov – Toronto
- David Hucal – Guelph
- Vanessa Maltese (National winner) – Toronto, ON for Balaclava
- Jenna Faye Powell (Sarnia).

==== Eastern ====
- Betino Assa (Honourable mention) – Montreal for Gathering in the forest, 12 am
- Philip Delisle (Halifax)
- Nicolas Rancellucci (Montreal)
- Corri-Lynn Tetz (Montreal)
- Julie Trudel (Montreal).

=== Jury ===
Western Canada

- Sandra Meigs - Senior Artist and Professor of Fine Arts, University of Victoria, Victoria
- Mark Mullin - Senior Artist, Calgary
- Nigel Prince, executive director of the Contemporary Art Gallery in Vancouver

Central Canada

- Clint Roenisch - Founder, Clint Roenisch Gallery, Toronto
- Jonathan Shaughnessy – associate curator, contemporary art at the National Gallery of Canada
- Monica Tap - Senior Artist and Associate Professor, University of Guelph, Guelph

Eastern Canada

- Roger Bellemare - Gallery Director, Galerie Roger Bellemare, Montreal
- Robin Metcalfe - Director and Curator, Saint Mary's University Art Gallery, Halifax
- Janet Werner - Senior Artist, Montreal (2002 jury)

== 2013 ==
=== Finalists ===
==== Western Canada ====
- Jessica Bell – Vancouver
- Colleen Heslin (National winner) – Vancouver for Almost young, wild and free, 2013
- Brian Kokoska (2016 finalist) – Vancouver/New York
- Rachelle Sawatsky – Vancouver/Los Angeles
- Sean Weisgerber – Saskatoon

==== Central Canada ====
- Jennifer Carvalho – Toronto
- Colin Muir Dorward – (Honourable mention, 2012 finalist) Ottawa, ON for Labyrinthineon, 2012
- Scott Everingham – Toronto (2010 finalist)
- Laura Findlay – Guelph, Ont.
- Neil Harrison (Honourable mention) – Toronto, ON for Fig.13 Knowledge, 2013

==== Eastern Canada ====
- Brendan Flanagan – Montreal
- Adam Gunn – Halifax (2011 finalist)
- Nathaniel Hurtubise – Montreal
- Jessica Mensch – Montreal/Brooklyn, N.Y.
- Aaron Weldon – Halifax

=== Jury ===
==== Western Canada ====
- Ian Wallace - Senior Artist, Vancouver
- Holger Kalberg (finalist 2005) - Artist and Assistant Professor, University of Manitoba, Winnipeg
- Ryan Doherty - Curator, Southern Alberta Art Gallery, Lethbridge

==== Central Canada ====
- Sarah Milroy - Art critic, Toronto
- Daniel Faria - Gallery Director, Daniel Faria Gallery, Toronto
- Carol Wainio - Artist and Adjunct Professor, University of Ottawa, Ottawa

==== Eastern Canada ====
- Stéphane Aquin – curator of contemporary art Musée des beaux-arts de Montréal
- Pan Wendt – curator Confederation Centre Art Gallery
- Isa Tousignant – writer and editor

== 2014 ==
=== Finalists ===
==== Western Canada ====
- Ashleigh Bartlett – Calgary, AB for Ballet Duo
- Ufuk Gueray (Honourable mention) - Winnipeg, MB for Market, 2014 B
- Tiziana La Melia (National winner) – Vancouver, BC for Hanging on to the part, 2014
- Laura Piasta – Vancouver, BC
- Robert Taite – Winnipeg, MB

==== Central Canada ====
- Jennifer Carvalho (finalist 2013) – Toronto, ON
- Wallis Cheung – Toronto, ON
- James Gardner – Toronto, ON
- Gavin Lynch – Ottawa, ON\
- Megan McCabe – Toronto, ON

==== Eastern Canada ====
- Carly Butler – Halifax, NS
- Teto Elsiddique – Halifax, NS
- Karine Fréchette – Montreal, QC
- Nicolas Lachance (Honourable mention) – Montreal, QC index no. 3 The book of Empathy, 2014
- Elysanne Tremblay – Montreal, QC

=== Jury ===
==== West ====
- Naomi Potter, Director and Curator, Esker Foundation, Calgary
- Melanie O'Brian, Director, SFU Galleries, Burnaby
- Catriona Jeffries, Owner and Director, Catriona Jeffries Gallery, Vancouver

==== Central ====
- Melissa Bennett, Curator of Contemporary Art, Art Gallery of Hamilton, Hamilton
- Robert Houle, Senior Artist, Toronto
- Will Kucey, Owner and Director, LE Gallery, Toronto

==== East ====
- Anthony Burnham, Artist, Montreal
- Mark Lanctôt, Curator, Musée d'art contemporain de Montréal, Montréal
- Deborah Carver, Owner and Director, Studio 21 Fine Art Gallery, Halifax

== 2015 ==
=== Finalists ===
==== Western ====
- Tristan Unrau – Vancouver, BC
- Robert Taite – Winnipeg, MB
- Russell Leng – Vancouver, BC
- Megan Hepburn – Vancouver, BC
- Simon deBrée – Vancouver, BC/Stockholm, Sweden

==== Central ====
- Jessica Bell - Ottawa, ON
- Patrick Cruz (National winner) – Guelph (Ontario) for Time allergy, 2015
- Hanna Hur - Toronto, ON/Los Angeles, CA
- Caroline Larsen - Toronto, ON
- Claire Scherzinger (Honourable mention) – Toronto, ON for My Contribution To The Many Paintings Of Pots And Plants, 2015

==== Eastern ====
- Andrew Maize - Lunenberg, NS
- John Player - Montreal, QC
- Cindy Phenix - Montreal, QC
- Paul Hardy - Montreal QC
- Hangama Amiri (Honourable mention) – Halifax, NS Island of Dreams, 2015 Halifax, NS

=== Jury ===
==== East ====
- Hugues Charbonneau – Director, Galerie Hugues Charbonneau, Montreal
- Melanie Colosimo – Director, Anna Leonowens Gallery, NSCAD University, Halifax
- John Zeppetelli – Director & Chief Curator, Musée d’art contemporain de Montréal, Montreal

==== Central ====
- Iga Janik – Curator, Cambridge Galleries, Cambridge
- Georgiana Uhlyarik - Associate Curator, Canadian Art, Art Gallery of Ontario, Toronto
- Jinny Yu – Artist & Associate Professor, Department of Visual Arts, University of Ottawa, Ottawa

==== West ====
- Eli Bornowsky – Artist, RBC Canadian Painting Competition Finalist (2007, 2008, 2010), Vancouver
- Garry Neil Kennedy – Senior Artist, Vancouver
- Lisa Kehler – Director, Lisa Kehler Art + Projects, Winnipeg

== 2016 ==
=== Finalists ===
==== Western ====
- Cameron Forbes (Honourable mention) – Saskatoon, SK for Maritime Plaza Hotel, Window Set 2, 2016
- Brian Hunter (National winner) – Winnipeg, MB for Two empty trays mounted vertically, 2015
- Brian Kokoska – Vancouver, BC/New York, NY for Dancing to the Silence of your Heartbeat, 2016[53]
- M.E. Sparks – Vancouver, BC for Afterimage, 2016
- Angela Teng – Vancouver, BC for Jump Shot, 2016

==== Central ====
- Wallis Cheung – Toronto, ON for Frame as void, 2016[54]
- Alex Fischer – Toronto, ON Pet, for Casper and Hesperi, 2016[54]
- Stephanie Hier – Toronto, ON for Break like the wind, 2015
- Hanna Hur – Los Angeles, CA for The Fool, 2016
- Keita Morimoto – Toronto, ON for Aya in Tokyo, 2015[54]

==== Eastern ====
- Nika Fontaine (Honourable mention) – Berlin, DE for Schnell Schnell, 2015
- Andrew Maize (2015 finalist) – Lunenburg, NS for THIS TOWN USED TO BE MOSTLY WHITE. NOW IT IS COLOURFUL, 2016
- Justine Skahan – Gatineau, QC for Home, 2016
- Geetha Thurairajah – Sackville, NB for Hotlines, 2016
- Ambera Wellmann – Guelph, ON for Wunde, 2015

=== Jury ===
==== Western Canada ====
- Sophie Brodovitch - Director, Equinox Gallery, Vancouver
- Tammi Campbell - Artist, Saskatoon
- Reid Shier - Director/Curator, Presentation House Gallery, Vancouver

==== Central Canada ====
- Kent Monkman - Artist, Toronto
- Georgia Scherman - Director, Georgia Scherman Projects, Toronto
- Beth Stuart - Artist & 2010 & 2011 RBC Canadian Painting Competition Alumni, Toronto

==== Eastern Canada ====
- Gemey Kelly - Director/Curator, Owens Gallery, Mt. Allison University, Sackville
- Harold Klunder - Artist, Montreal
- Saelan Twerdy - Art Critic, Montreal

== 2017 ==
=== Finalists ===
- Michael Freeman Badour for Patrick's Boots, 2017
- Amanda Boulos for Duckie Wants Water, 2017
- Teto Elsiddique (Honourable mention) – Halifax, NS for neckrings, a breezy thing, 2017
- Cindy Ji Hye Kim for Conspiracy Theory, 2017
- David Kaarsemaker for Portage 1, 2017
- Wei Li for Obsessiveness and excitement, never growing out of them, 2017
- Laura Payne for Enneadec II, 2017
- Veronika Pausova (Honourable mention) – Toronto, ON for Typography, 2017
- Laura Rokas-Bérubé for Paint by Number 7, 2017
- M.E. Sparks for Hollow Dog, 2017
- Kizi Spielmann Rose for Sun and a Tide Pool, 2017
- Angela Teng for Line Dance (Pink and Black for Mary Heilmann), 2016
- Joani Tremblay The Lure of the Local Senses of Place in a Multicentered Society, 2017
- Tristan Unrau for Nun, After Pasolini, 2017
- Ambera Wellman (Winner) – Guelph, ON for Temper Ripened, 2007

== 2018 ==
=== Finalists ===
- Amanda Boulos (Winner) for In the Morning
- Keiran Brennan Hinton for Hotel Room
- Krystle Coughlin for Untitled
- Sarah Davidson for the garden at night
- Angela Fermor for Portrait 7, Torso
- Karine Fréchette for Croissance 1
- Stephanie Hier for Walnuts and pears you plant for your heirs
- Ally McIntyre for Coyote
- Emmanuel Osahor (honourable mention) for Hiding Place
- Lauren Pelc-McArthur for Trop Trop
- geetha thurairajah (honourable mention) or A complicated relationship with our past makes for better stories of a future
- Kizi Spielmann Rose for Swallowtail
- Joani Tremblay for The Mind at Three Miles an Hour
- Tristan Unrau for Doggy Dog Afternoon
- Joy Wong for Cotton and Cheese 1

=== Jury ===
- Natasha Chaykowski
- Mark Igloliorte
- Crystal Mowry
- Erin Stump
- Alexandra McIntosh
- Julie Trudel
- Cynthia Daignault

== See also ==
- Sobey Art Award
- Governor General's Awards
- Audain Prize
- Scotiabank Photography Award
- Hnatyshyn Foundation Visual Arts Awards
- Joseph Plaskett Foundation Award
