= Joseph Plaskett Foundation Award =

Visual art award

Joseph Plaskett Award
- Description: Award for a Canadian MFA graduate to study painting in Europe
- Country: Canada
- Presented by: Joe Plaskett Foundation

The Joseph Plaskett Award in Painting, also known as the Joe Plaskett Foundation Award or The Plaskett, is a biennial Canadian Arts prize worth $65,000 awarded to a recent or current Canadian MFA graduate student with a specialization in painting.

The Joe Plaskett Foundation was established in 2004 by Canadian-born artist Joseph Plaskett, to support a mature Canadian student to travel and make art in Europe for one year in emulation of what Emily Carr allowed Plaskett to do in 1946.

From 2009 to 2018, the Joseph Plaskett Foundation partnered with the Royal Canadian Academy of Arts to support and administer the award process. From 2019 onwards, the award process has been managed by a committee made from members of the Joe Plaskett Foundation Board of Directors.

== Award recipients ==
- Mark Neufeld (2004)
- Jennifer Lefort (2005)
- Ehryn Torrell (2006)
- Todd Tremeer (2007)
- Nam Duc Nguyen (2008)
- Vitaly Medvedovsky (2009)
- Megan Hepburn (2010)
- Jessica Groome (2011)
- Philip Delisle (2012)
- Julie Trudel (2013)
- Collin Johanson (2014)
- Stanzie Tooth (2015)
- Ambera Wellmann (2016)
- Jason Stovall (2017)
- Karine Fréchette (2018)
- Caroline Mousseau (2019)
- Azadeh Elmizadeh (2020)
- Emmanuel Osahor (2021)
- Shoora Majedian (2022)
- Chantal Khoury (2023)
- Claire Drummond (2025)
