= Nick de Angelis =

- Born: Nicholas Angelo; June 1, 1921
- Died: June 21, 2004 (aged 83)
- Website: https://www.nickdeangelis.com

Nick de Angelis (June 21, 1921 – 2004) was an American artist who lived and worked most of his life in New York City. His work was widely recognized for its excellence until he became disenchanted with the cocktail-party art circles and preferred to spend most of his time in his studio creating masterpieces in all sizes and media. Nick's early work was mostly soft and dreamy watercolors, while his later work showed increasing power and symbolism. As his interest moved into the combining of Man and Machine, his work could no longer be contained in two-dimensional surfaces and he gravitated to sculpture.

== Personal life ==
Nick de Angelis, was born in New Jersey as Nicholas Angelo but later changed his surname to the original family name: de Angelis. He served in Europe, Africa and Italy in the U.S. Army, where he was wounded and awarded the Purple Heart.

His childhood drawings decorated the walls of his attic bedroom until the 1990s when the house burned down and only a ghostly shell remained. In his early career de Angelis painted exquisite watercolors of street life and café scenes, paintings of Paris and the Seine and of New York coffee houses. De Angelis’ work has evolved significantly during the more than forty years he created art, morphing from realistic to the highly abstract. He worked in whatever media was close at hand in his 57th Street apartment, where he could walk to the Art Students League. His color choices ranged from delicate pastels to bright and clashing primary colors to somber blacks and grays. His portraiture was magnificent and his self-portraits depict much of the pain he experienced in his own life, particularly during his military service. After a long career as an illustrator for various top agencies in New York, de Angelis, in the 1960s, dedicated his life solely to his passion for painting and sculpting, which consumed him to the very end of his life.

After Nick's death in 2004 of pancreatic cancer, his wife Josiane de Angelis, was left with a monumental body of work – the content is estimated to thousands of sketches, drawings, watercolors and sculptures. A body of forty years of solitary artwork has never been shown to the public.

== Career ==
De Angelis was a life member of the Art Students League of New York and a life member of the American Watercolor Society, where he was appointed vice president, and jury member of A.W.S. for group shows and traveling exhibitions to National Museums.

His work has been shown in numerous exhibitions, including:

- New York City Center, invitational and jury shows in New York City.
- Peter Dietch, invitational drawing show New York City
- Guild Hall, invitational exhibition, East Hampton, NY
- F.A.R. Gallery, New York City
- Frank Eagan, invitational exhibition, New York City
- Martha Jackson, group invitational exhibition, New York City
- National Arts Club, invitational exhibition, New York City
- Salmagundi, invitational exhibition, New York City
- Allan Stone Gallery, New York City
- Gallery 10, solo and group shows, New Hope Pennsylvania
- Arthur Breslauer, Munich, Germany
- Slide Exhibitions in the Soviet Union Invitational, directed by William Smith
- Illustrated ‘The Vision of Francois the Fox’ by Julia Cunningham, published by Pantheon Books, a division of Random House
- Produced eight color paintings for the book ‘Power Sits at Another Table’ by Earl Shorris, published by Simon and Schuster

The work of Nicholas de Angelis is with many private collections including: Allan Stone, Chico Hamilton, Erich Knight and the Martinson Coffee Company. The art critic Sidney Gilbert, in a review in the October issue of Artspeak, wrote, "Allan Stone mounts a sensational group show... Nick de Angelis shows a masterful monochromatic painting of a mechanical cat, comprised of slinky machine parts".
