= Patrick Cruz (artist) =

Filipino-Canadian artist

Patrick Cruz (born 1987) is a Filipino-Canadian artist and educator based in Toronto. His practice is influenced by the intersections of folk spirituality, diasporic aesthetics, cultural hybridity, decolonization and the role of play within clownhood.

== Early life and education ==
Cruz was born in Quezon City, Philippines in 1987. He studied painting at the University of the Philippines Diliman in 2005. In 2010, he received a Bachelor of Fine Arts from Emily Carr University of Art + Design and received his Master of Fine Arts at the University of Guelph in 2016. He also holds a certificate in Pochinko clowning.

== Career ==
Cruz has exhibited his work both nationally and internationally at venues such as the Or Gallery Berlin (2012), The Art Center of Chulangkorn (2014), Centre for Contemporary Asian Art (2016), Project Pangée (2016), Art Gallery of Alberta (2017), Gasworks (2017), Plug In Institute of Contemporary Art (2017), the 1st Manila Biennale (2018), Vargas Museum (2018), 3331 Arts Chiyoda (2019), Contemporary Art Gallery (2019), Oakville Galleries (2018), Obrera Centro (2019), Whose Museum (2019), Gallery TPW (2020), Vancouver Art Gallery (2021), Cultural Center of The Philippines (2022), and the Susan Hobbs Gallery (2017 and 2023).

Cruz won the 17th RBC Canadian Painting Competition in 2015. He was also long-listed for the Sobey Art Award in 2019. In 2021, he received the Thirteen Artists Award from the Cultural Center of the Philippines.

Cruz is an assistant professor in Studio Art at the University of Toronto's Scarborough and Daniels campuses and is a co-founder of the curatorial collective Kamias Special Projects which hosts and organizes the Kamias Triennial.
