= Arabella Campbell =

Canadian artist

- Born: 1973 (age 52–53); Vancouver, British Columbia, Canada
- Education: University of British Columbia, San Francisco Art Institute, Emily Carr University
- Known for: Painter, Photographer
- Awards: RBC Painting Competition

Arabella Campbell is a Canadian artist based in Vancouver, British Columbia. She graduated with a Bachelor of Arts from the University of British Columbia in 1996, and a Bachelor of Fine Arts from Emily Carr University of Art and Design (renamed in 2008) in 2002. She attended the San Francisco Art Institute from 1998 to 2000. She has exhibited locally, nationally, and internationally. She works out of a warehouse studio in False Creek Flats, Vancouver.

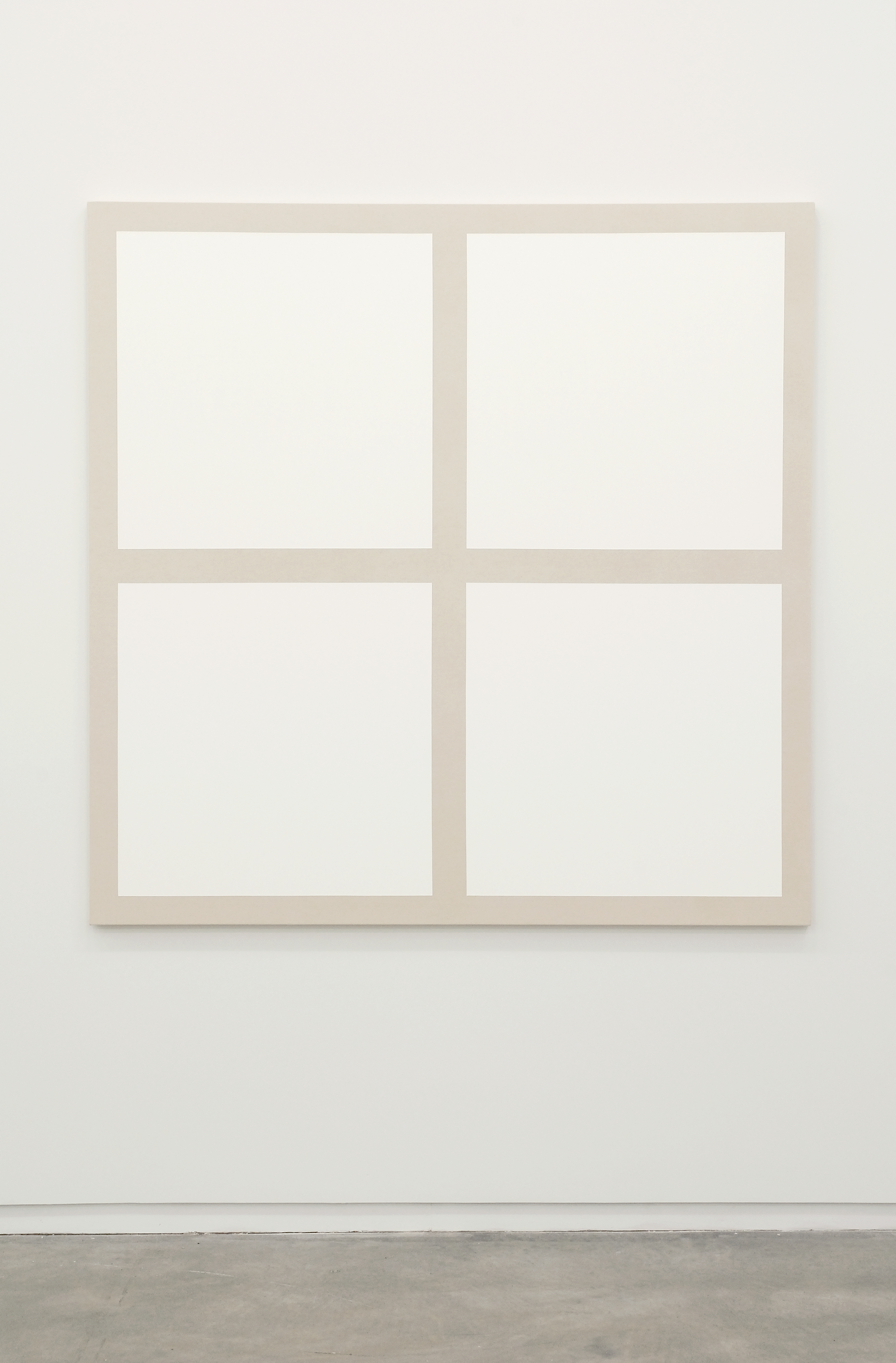
Physical Facts Series #7, 2007 acrylic on canvas 60 x 60 inches

== Early life ==
Arabella was born in Vancouver in 1973, Campbell grew up in remote Loughborough Inlet, in coastal British Columbia. Campbell was homeschooled for ten years, she later graduated from Shawnigan Lake School. Campbell studied painting in Southern France before returning to British Columbia to pursue a BA (with a focus on art history) from the University of British Columbia.

== Artistic practice ==
Writing for Artspeak, Cindy Richmond has described Campbell's work as a "confirmation of Minimalism's continued vitality. Her monochrome paintings, site-specific installations and sculptures allow her to explore issues implicit to a stripped-down aesthetic and examine the context in which art is experienced." However, Neil Campbell (no relation) of Emily Carr University of Art and Design has argued that while "Arabella's paintings concern themselves with conceptual or formal strategies, I find my main response is to the aesthetic character of the work. The surfaces of her monochromes are rendered carefully, step by step, through a reverential application of paint. It's that observance that affects me." This, Neil Campbell argues, is intended on Arabella Campbell's part.

Campbell's "Physical Facts Series #6" won the 2007 RBC Canadian Painting Competition, which is the largest award for Emerging Canadian Artists. "Physical Facts Series #6" acknowledges "the support structure of the actual canvas," in a manner typical of her exploration of "the colours of the gallery walls and the tools and methods of the painter." "Physical Facts Series #6" has been praised for achieving "intelligent results [that] both critique and glorify the medium of painting."

Campbell's work for "Painting After Poverty" reconsidered "what is held to be peripheral to a work of art...in her attempt to calibrate from memory the precise shade of white paint used by three art institutions upon their walls."

== Local impact ==
Campbell's work is a part of the Audain Art Museum's permanent collection of British Columbian art, and Square Process Paintings; Right Tilted, Left Tilted was featured as a part of Masterworks from the Audain Art Museum, which seeks to highlight 57 works in the museum's permanent collection as representative of "two hundred years of British Columbia's remarkable visual art".

Campbell has also been named as one of Vancouver's '7 New Painters' alongside Etienne Zack, Matthew Brown, Tim Gardner, Holger Kalberg, Elizabeth McIntosh, and Charlie Roberts.

Campbell herself has embraced a "location-based identification" with Vancouver and British Columbia, its spirit of "rigour and frontier freedom," and the artistic freedom afforded by its isolation from "any other substantial art centre".

== Solo exhibitions ==
- "Arabella Campbell", 25 March – 30 April 2011, Catriona Jeffries Gallery, Vancouver, British Columbia.
- "Taken from there to "here to where it came from and taken to a place and used in such a manner that it can only remain as a representation of what it was where it came from"", 2008, Artspeak, Vancouver, British Columbia.
- "Arabella Campbell", 8 June – 7 July 2007, Catriona Jeffries Gallery, Vancouver, British Columbia.

== Select group exhibitions ==
- "Poetics of Space," 2019, Kelowna Art Gallery, British Columbia
- "Poetics of Space," 2018, Nanaimo Art Gallery, Nanaimo, British Columbia
- "Entangled: Two Views on Contemporary Canadian Painting," 30 September 2017 - 1 January 2018, Vancouver Art Gallery, Vancouver, British Columbia
- "Kitchen Midden", 25 September 2016 - 14 January 2017, Griffin Art Projects, North Vancouver, BC
- "Readymades" Gordon Smith Gallery, North Vancouver, British Columbia
- "Masterworks from the Audain Art Museum," 2016, Audian Art Museum, Whistler, British Columbia
- "Cámara de maravillas: últimos días en sala," 20 April – 26 June 2016, Museo de Arte Moderno, Medellín, Colombia. Curated by Jens Hoffmann.
- "Cámara de maravillas," 7 October 2015 – 14 February 2016, Centro de la Imagen, Ciudad de México, México. Curated by Jens Hoffmann.
- "Poetics of Space", 31 January - 24 May 2015, Vancouver Art Gallery, Vancouver, British Columbia
- "Gordon Smith Collection," 14 March - 14 May 2015, West Vancouver Museum, West Vancouver, BC
- "TBD," 6 September – 26 October 2014, Museum of Contemporary Art Toronto Canada (now the Museum of Contemporary Canadian Art), Toronto, Ontario. Curated by Su-Ying Lee.
- "Who's Afraid of Purple, Orange and Green?," 25 April – 20 June 2014, Dunlop Art Gallery, Regina, Saskatchewan. Curated by Jennifer Matotek.
- "Landscape Revised," December 2013, Kamloops Art Gallery, Kamloops, British Columbia. Curated by Charo Neville.
- "The Painting Project: A Snapshot of Painting in Canada," 7 June – 6 July 2013, Galerie de l'UQAM, Montreal, Quebec. Curated by Julie Bélisle.
- "When Attitudes Become Form Become Attitudes," 1 February – 31 March 2013, Museum of Contemporary Art Detroit, Detroit. Curated by Jens Hoffmann.
- "Color Shift," 10 January – 9 February 2013, Mixed Greens, New York City. Curated by Jordan Tate.
- "When Attitudes Become Form Become Attitudes," 13 September – 1 December 2012, CCA Wattis Institute for Contemporary Arts, San Francisco. Curated by Jens Hoffmann.
- "Shore, Forest and Beyond: Art from the Audain Collection," 29 October 2011 - 29 January 2012, Vancouver Art Gallery, Vancouver
- "Everything Everyday", 2 October 2010 – 16 January 2011, Vancouver Art Gallery, Vancouver, British Columbia. Curated by Bruce Grenville.
- "Stowaways," 2009, CCA Wattis, San Francisco, California
- "The Museum as Medium," 23 October 2008 – 3 January 2009, Koldo Mitxelena Kulturunea, Donostia-San Sebastián, Basque Autonomous Community, Spain. Curated by Pablo Fanego and Pedro de Llano.
- "The Museum as Medium," 20 June – 21 September 2008, Museo de Arte Contemporánea de Vigo, Vigo, Spain. Curated by Pablo Fanego and Pedro de Llano.
- "THIS IS NOT A VOID," 25 October 2008 – 22 January 2009, Galeria Luisa Strina, São Paulo, Brazil.
- "Past as Present," 2008, York Art Gallery, York, England
- "Very Abstract and Hyper Figurative," 2007, Thomas Dane Gallery, London, England. Curated by Jens Hoffmann
- "FOR SALE," 2007, Cristina Guerra Contemporary Art, Lisbon, Portugal. Curated by Jens Hoffmann.
- "Painting After Poverty", 8 April – 14 May 2007, Catriona Jeffries Gallery, Vancouver, British Columbia.
- "The Monochromatic Field: Works From The Collection", 12 January – 11 March 2006, Morris and Helen Belkin Art Gallery, Vancouver, British Columbia.
- "A Modern Life: Art and Design in British Columbia 1945-1960," 2004, Vancouver Art Gallery, Vancouver, British Columbia

== Public Art ==
In 2011, Campbell created Lines in Architecture and Art, a landscape photomural which was installed at the Canada Line Vancouver City Centre Station on the corner of Granville and Georgia streets. The work was commissioned by the City of Vancouver Public Art Program and was a part of Vancouver 125.

== Permanent collections ==
Campbell's work can be found in the permanent collections of the Audain Art Museum Morris and Helen Belkin Art Gallery; Vancouver Art Gallery; West Vancouver Museum;, Oakville Galleries, Oakville, Ontario; Lodeveans Collection, UK; Rennie Collection, Vancouver; and the RBC Canadian Art Collection.

== Awards and residencies ==
- Glenfiddich Artist in Residence, Glenfiddich Distillery, Dufftown, Scotland. (2009)
- National Winner, 9th annual RBC Canadian Painting Competition. (2007)
- Art for Excellence prize, Canada Millennium Scholarship Foundation. (2002)

== Gallery ==
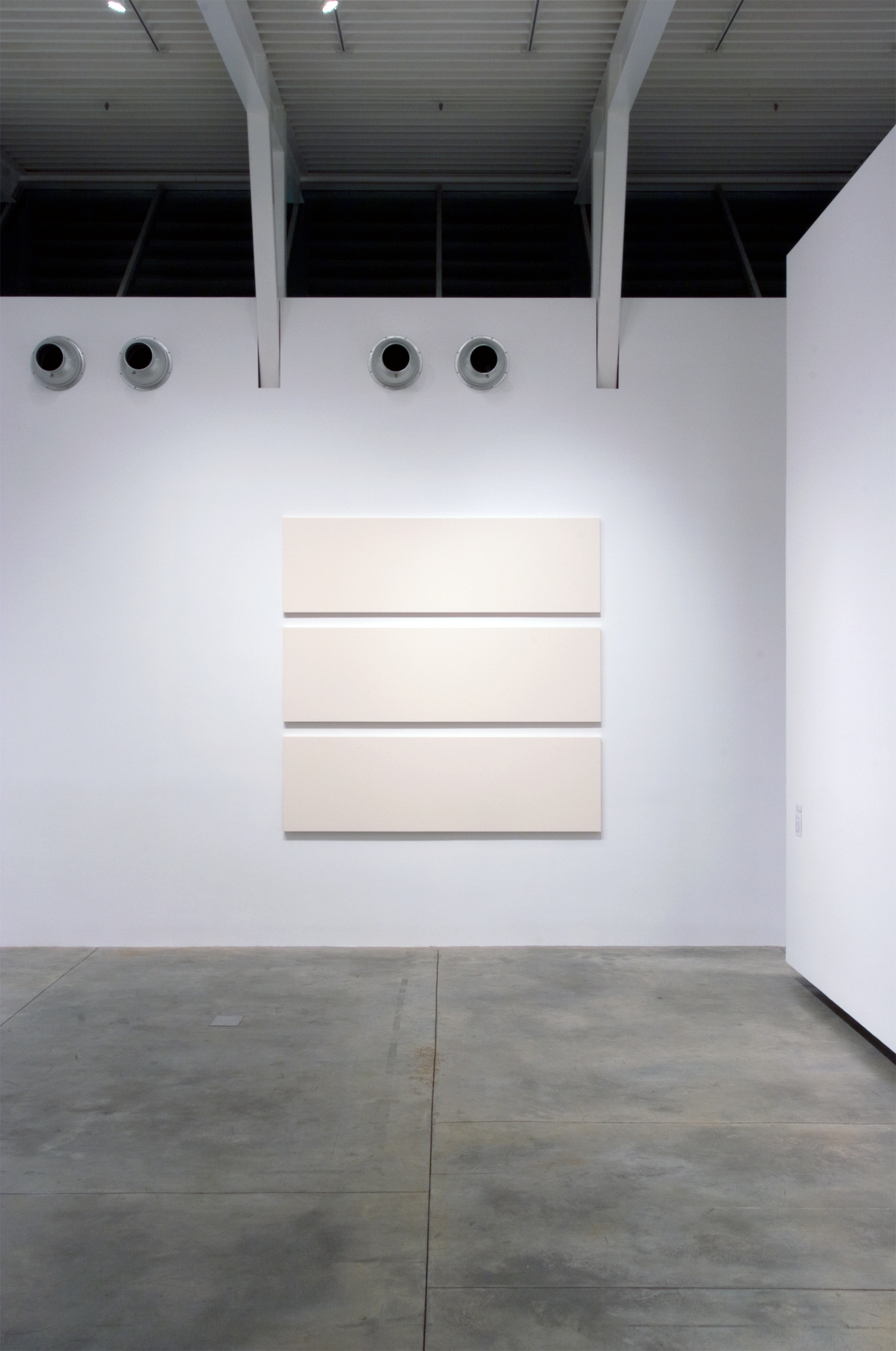
3 Rectangles Make A Square, 2005

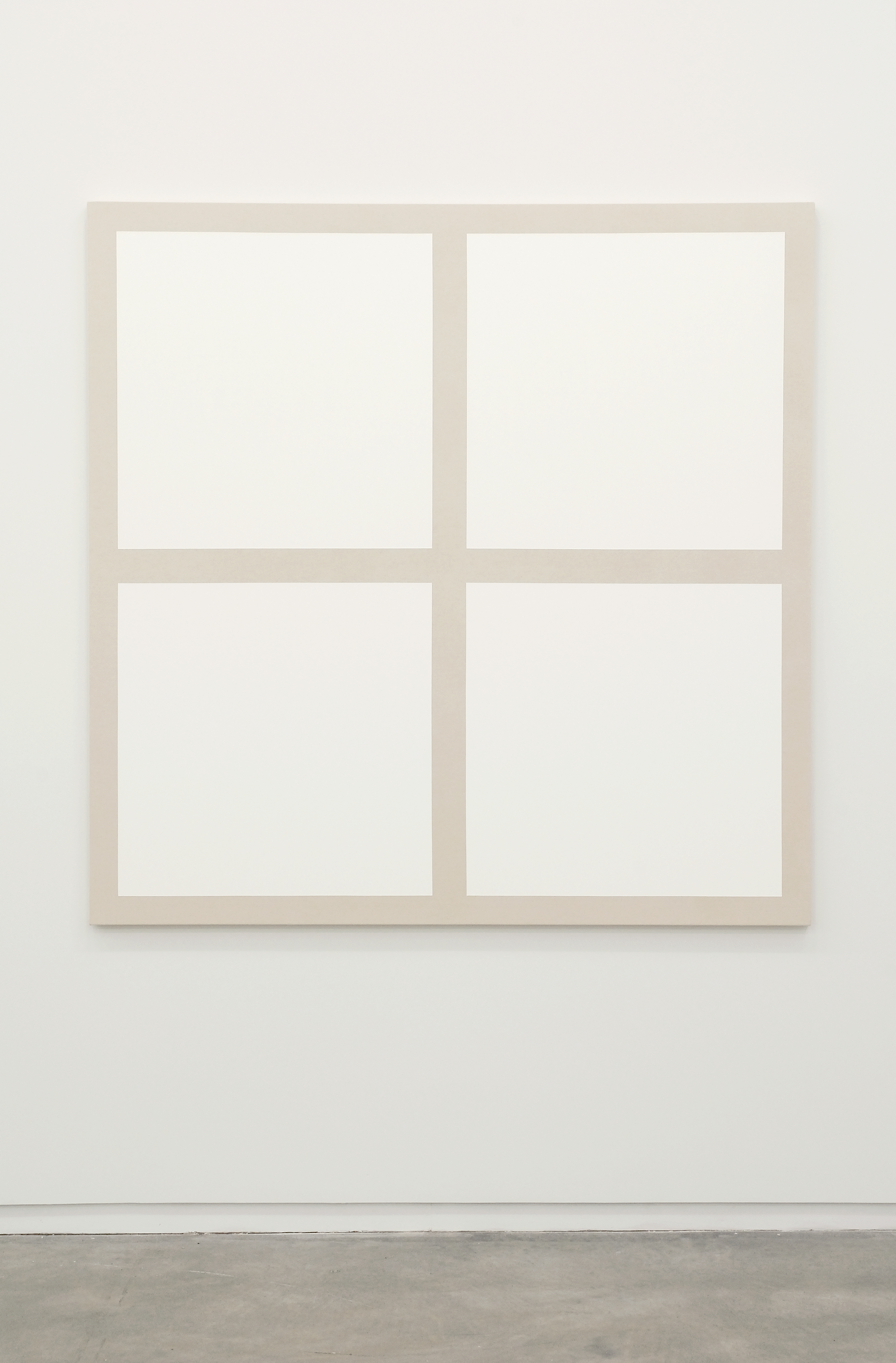
Physical Facts Series No. 7, 2007

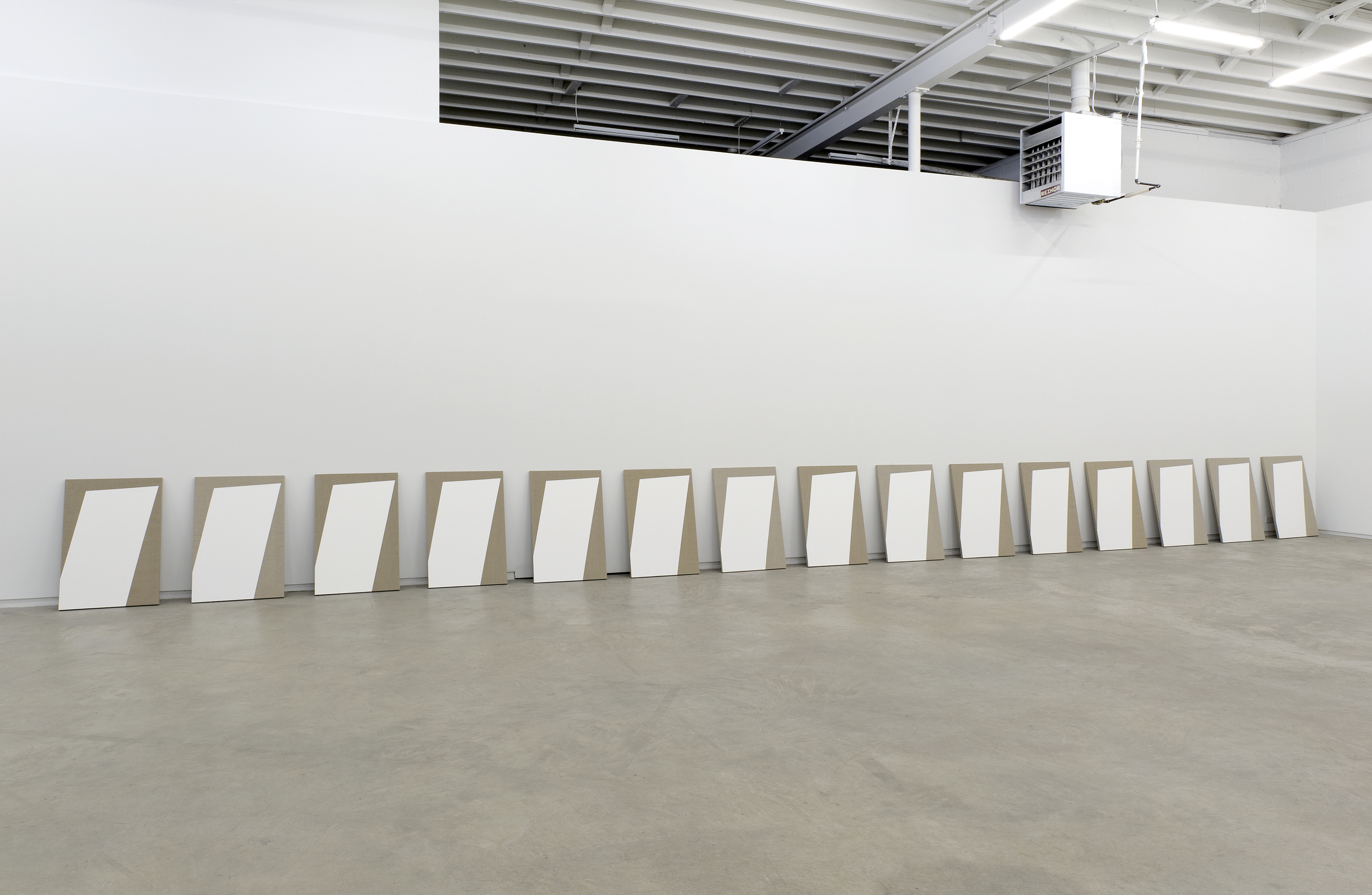
A catalogue of its own content, 2011

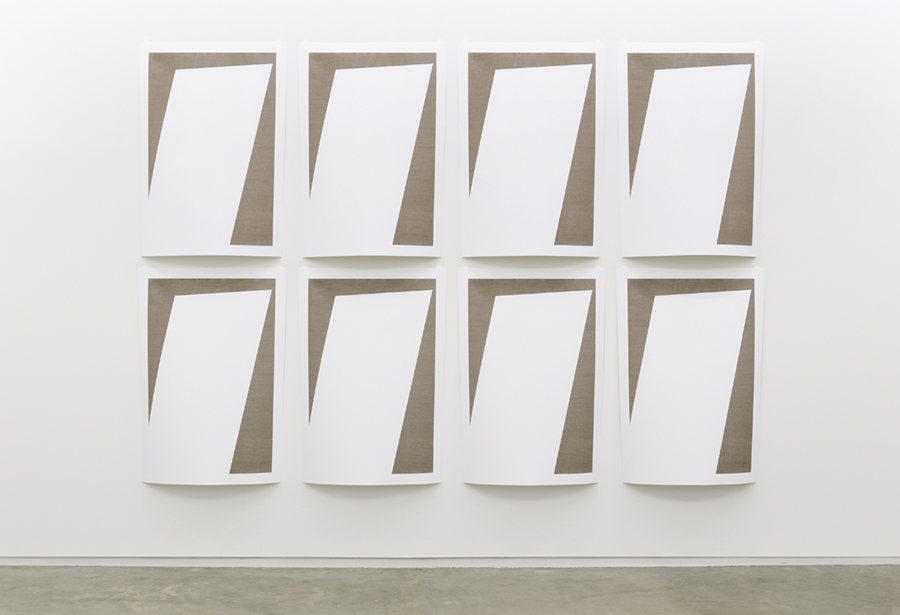
Studies for an incomplete work, 2011

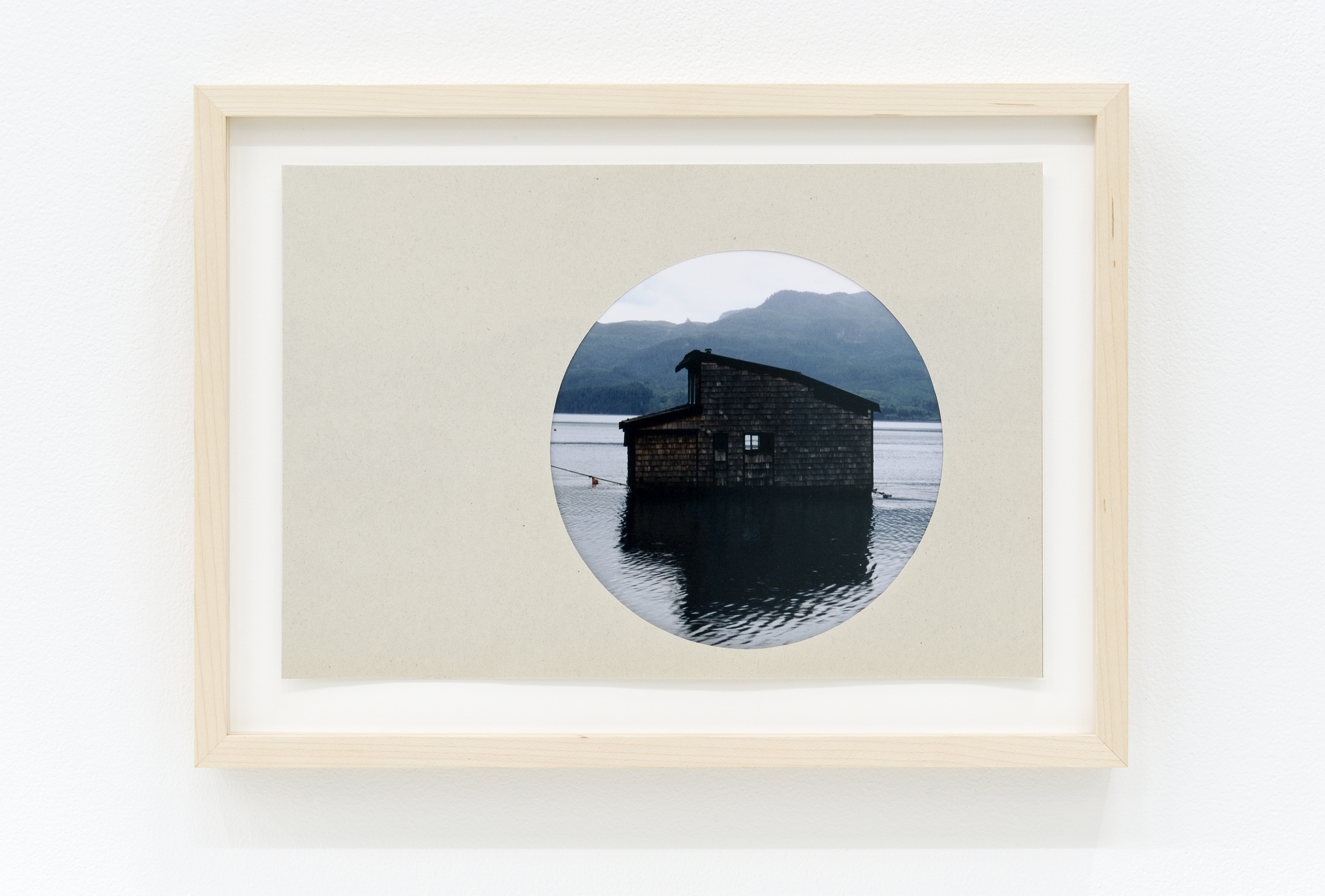
The window framed by a wall, 2011

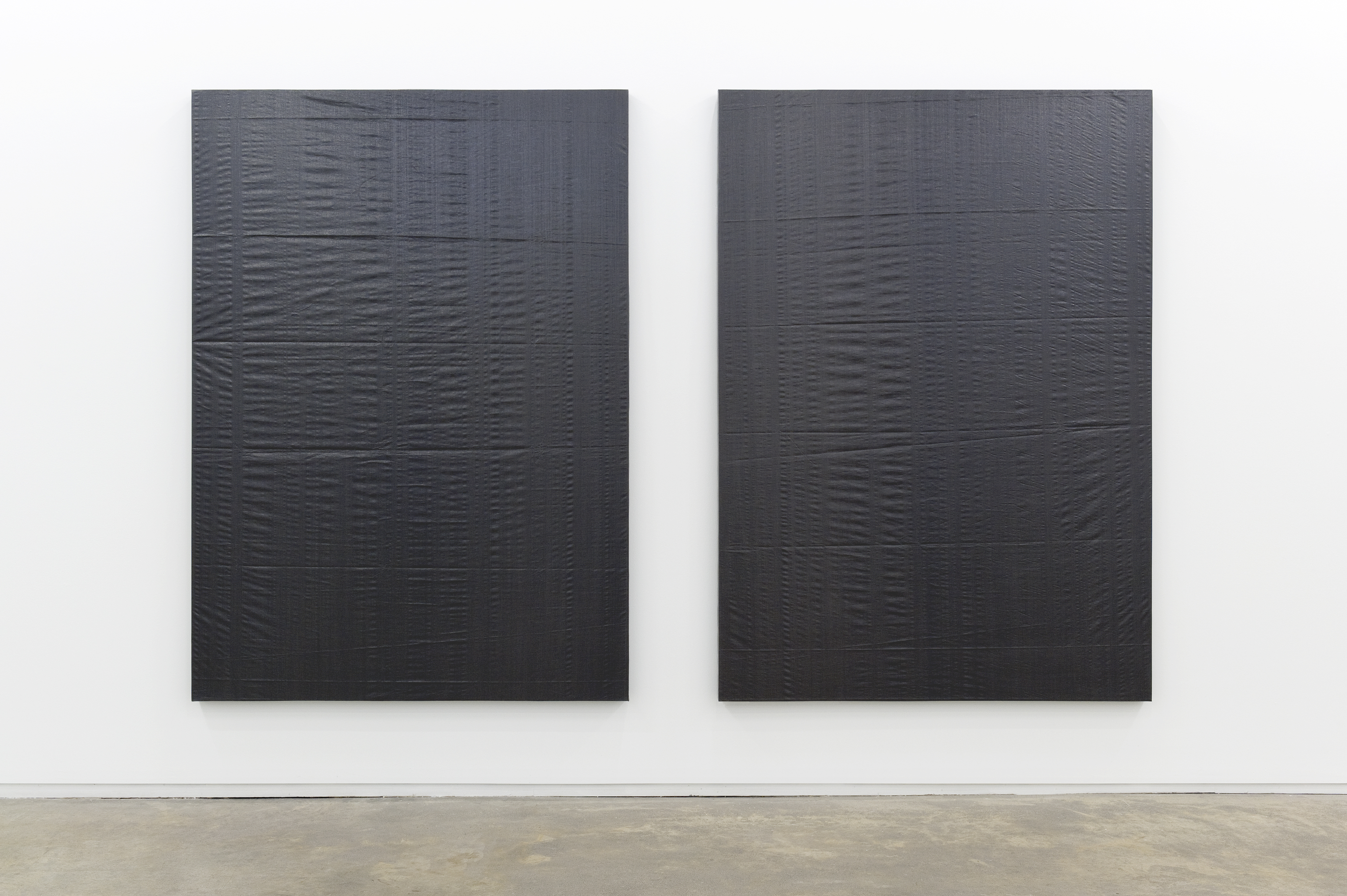
No Visible Means of Support, 2011

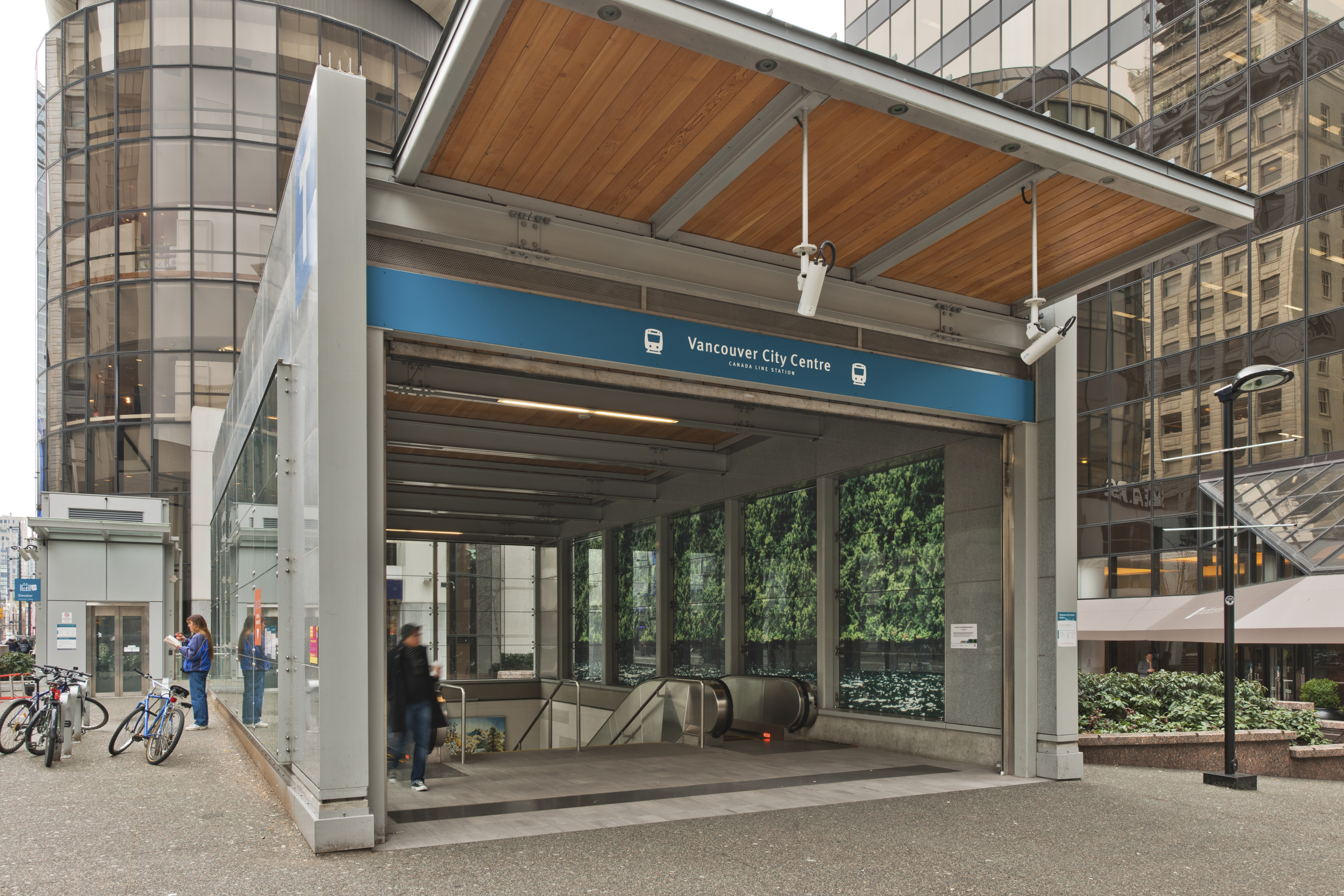
Lines in Architecture and Art, 2011 Location: Canada Line City Centre, Granville Street and West Georgia Street, Vancouver

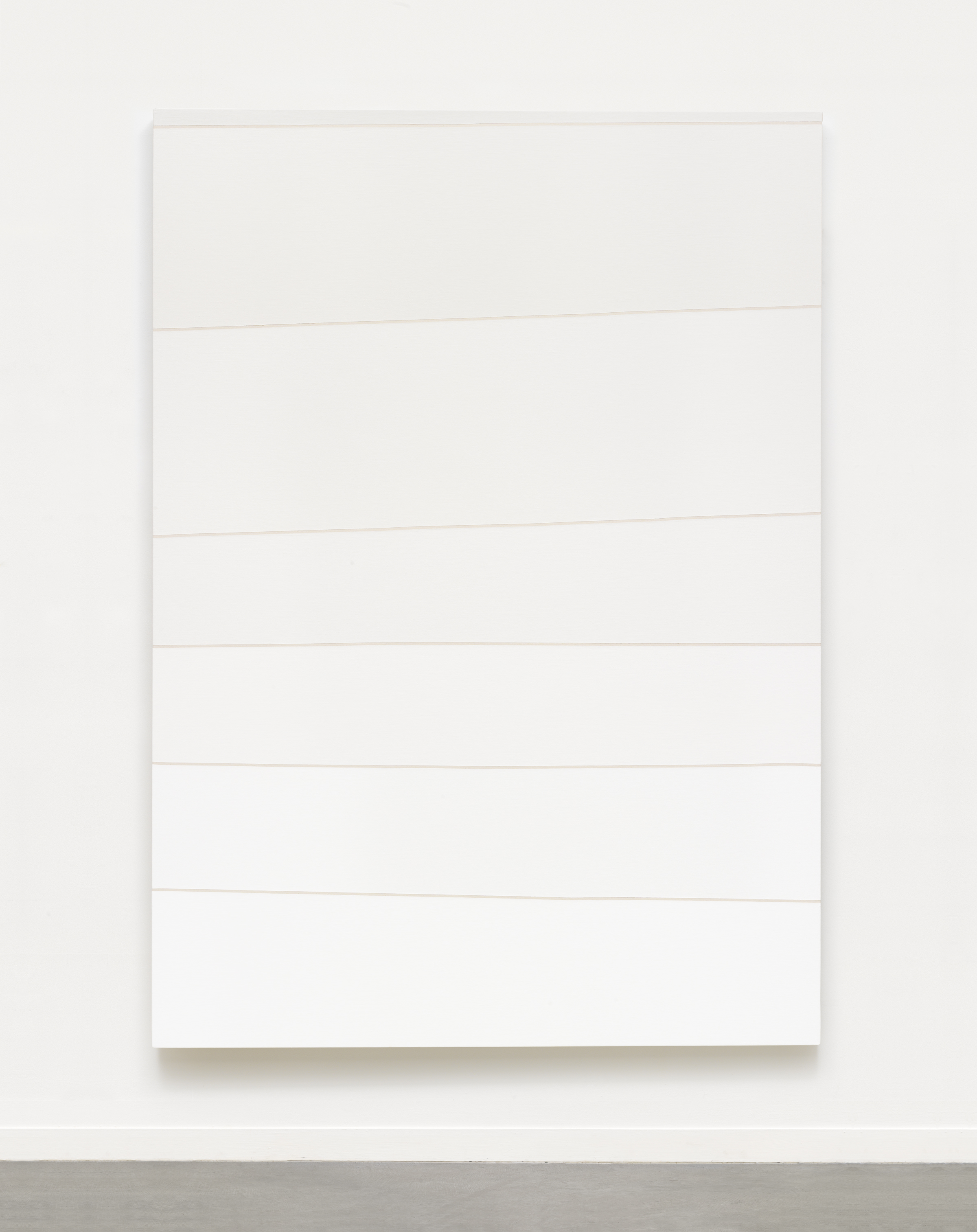
Folding Lines, 2017 Acrylic on Canvas

== Further listening ==
- The CIAC (Colección Isabel y Agustín Coppel) has produced apps (Android, Apple) for Cámara de maravillas/Camera of Wonders (2016) featuring interviews with curator Jens Hoffman, Wonne Ickx of PRODUCTORA, and artists from the show. Also available for viewing and listening are the relevant images, narrations, and texts.
