= Dionne (name) =

Dionne is both a modern feminine given name and a French Canadian surname. People with the name include:

== Given name ==
- Dionne Bainbridge (born 1978), New Zealand swimmer
- Dionne Brand (born 1953), Canadian writer
- Dionne Bromfield (born 1996), British singer
- Dionne Brown, English actress
- Dionne Bunsha, Indian journalist
- Dionne Edwards, British filmmaker
- Dionne Farris (born 1968), American musician
- Dionne Foster, American politician
- Dionne Irving, Canadian writer
- Dionne Lee (born 1988), American photographer
- Dionne Mack, American librarian
- Dionne Monsanto (born 1985), Filipino actress
- Dionne Price (1971–2024), American statistician
- Dionne Quan (born 1978), American voice actress
- Dionne Rakeem, British singer
- Dionne Rose-Henley (1969–2018), Jamaican hurdler
- Dionne Searcey, American investigative journalist
- Dionne Simpson, Jamaican Canadian textile artist
- Dionne Stax (born 1985), Dutch journalist and newsreader
- Dionne Tonna (born 1983), Maltese footballer
- Dionne Warwick (born 1940), American singer

== Surname ==
- Dionne quintuplets, Canadian quintuplets born in 1934
- Amable Dionne (1781–1852), Canadian politician
- Benjamin Dionne (1798–1883), Canadian politician
- Charles-Eugène Dionne (1908–1984), Canadian politician
- Charles-Eusèbe Dionne (1846–1925), French Canadian naturalist
- Deidra Dionne (born 1982), Canadian skier
- E. J. Dionne (born 1952), American journalist
- Georges Dionne (1876–1946), Canadian politician
- Gérard Dionne (1919–2020), Canadian bishop
- Gilbert Dionne (born 1970), Canadian hockey player
- Kim Yi Dionne (born 1977), American political scientist
- Ludger Dionne (1888–1962), Canadian politician
- Mahammed Dionne (1959–2024), Senegalese politician
- Marcel Dionne (born 1951), Canadian hockey player
- Marcel Dionne (politician) (1931–1998), Canadian politician
- Maurice Dionne (1936–2003), Canadian politician
- Mónica Dionne (born 1967), American actress of Mexican descent
- Rita Dionne-Marsolais (born 1947), Canadian economist
- Valérie Dionne (born 1980), Canadian water polo player

== See also ==
- Deioneus: Deon, Deion, Deone, Dion, Dione, Dionne
