= Dionne =

Dionne may refer to:

- Dionne (name)
- Centre Marcel Dionne, a multi-purpose arena in Quebec, Canada
- Dionne Lake in Nunavut, Canada
- Dionne quintuplets, the first quintuplets known to have survived their infancy
- USS Dionne, a destroyer escort ship of the United States Navy during World War II
- Dionne (1972 album), an album by Dionne Warwick
- Dionne (1979 album), an album by Dionne Warwick
- "Dionne", song by Prince Crystal Ball (box set)

== See also ==
- Deioneus: Deon, Deion, Deone, Dion, Dione, Dionne
