= Cindy Phenix =

Canadian painter (born 1989)

Cindy Phenix (born 1989 in Montreal, Quebec) is a Canadian painter living and working in Los Angeles, California. Phenix has exhibited internationally at venues including Nino Mier Gallery in Los Angeles and Brussels, 6018 North in Chicago, Galerie Hugues Charboneau in Montreal, Maison de la culture in Longueuil, and others.

== Biography ==
Phenix grew up in Montreal, Quebec. Phenix completed her BFA at Concordia University in Montreal in 2016. She earned an MFA at Northwestern University in Evanston, IL in 2020. Phenix's works are included in the collections of the Musée national des beaux-arts du Québec.

== Residencies and awards ==
- Banff Centre for Arts and Creativity Artist in Residence, 2017
- Master Research Fellowship Recipient, Fonds de recherche du Québec - Société et culture, 2018-2020
- RBC Canadian Painting Competition Finalist, 2015
