= Tiziana La Melia =

Italian-born artist

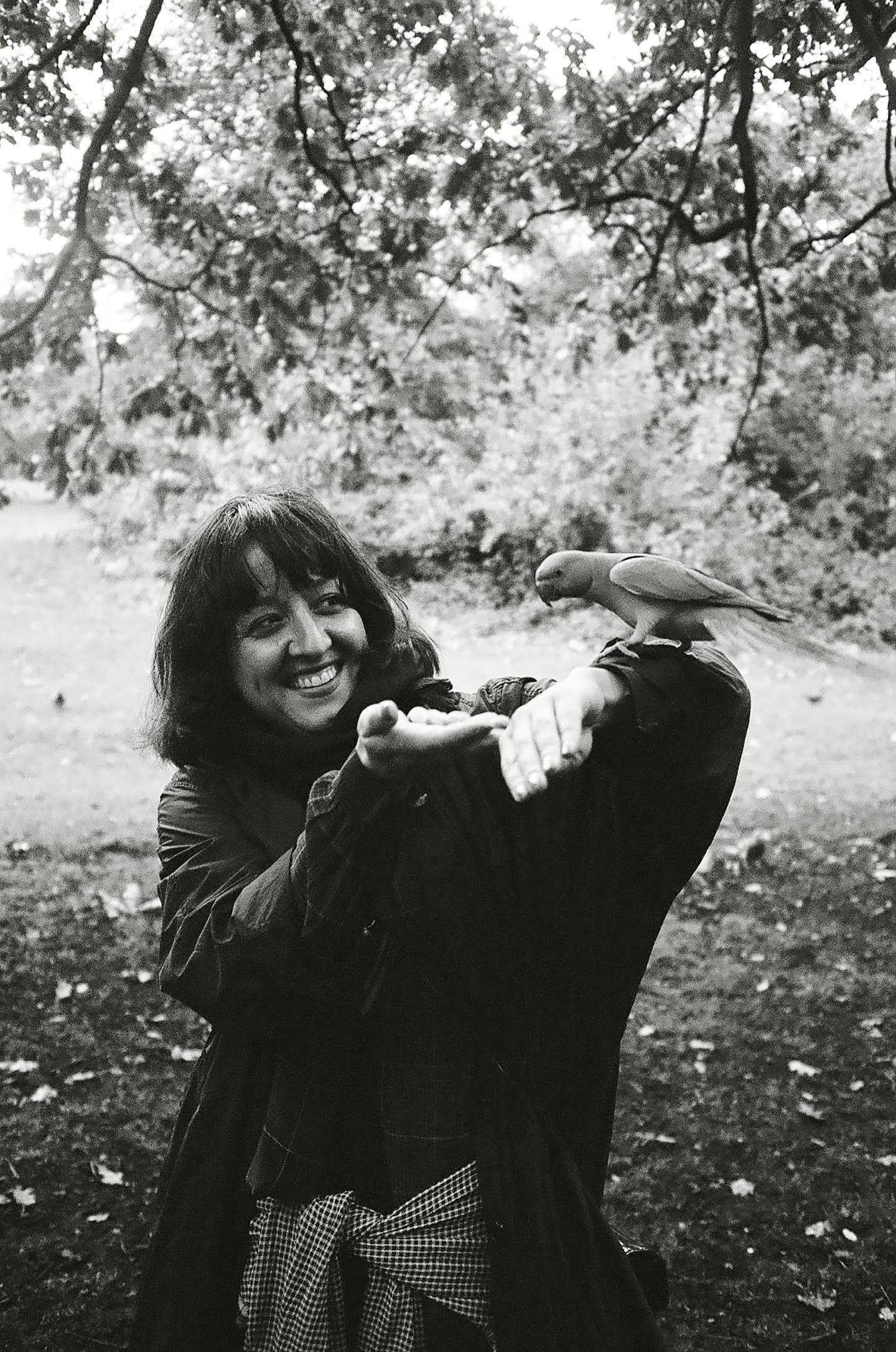
- Born: 1982 (age 43–44); Palermo, Italy
- Known for: Poetry, performance, painting, drawing, installation, playwright, sound art
- Awards: 2014 RBC Canadian Painting Competition
- Website: http://tizianalamelia.com/

Tiziana La Melia was born in 1982 in the city of Palermo, Italy. She is currently based in Vancouver, British Columbia, as a practising artist, writer, painter, and poet. She works within the mediums and intersections of poetry, writing, text, painting, drawing, sculpture, installation, collage, performance, and video work. Her oeuvre thematically and conceptually focuses on the intertwining thoughts she has about female archetypes, the feminine unconscious, auto-fiction, passion, and desire.

== Biography ==
=== Early life ===
Tiziana La Melia was born in Palermo, Italy, which is located on the major island of Sicily. Her family relocated to rural Winfield, British Columbia, in the Syilx Okanagan territories of Canada, when she was still a young girl. Having grown up within the context of a multi-lingual family newly settling in Canada, La Melia began her creative endeavours from this very young age. Inspiration for a growing imagination found her in the form of a fascination with the quotidian. Creativity, for La Melia, came from observing everyday occurrences. In a statement from La Melia in an interview with Jacquelyn Ross in 2013, she reveals that growing up in a bilingual home let her notice the slippages of language – that is the playfulness of puns or inventive cross-lingual jokes. These instances became an inspiration to incorporate the use of limitations in language within her artistic practise later in life.

=== Education ===
For post-secondary education, La Melia has attended both Simon Fraser University and Emily Carr University of Art + Design (formerly Emily Carr Institute of Art + Design). These institutions are both located in Vancouver, Canada. In 2008, she received a bachelor's degree in Fine Arts from Emily Carr. After this was achieved, La Melia relocated to Guelph, Ontario, to pursue a graduate degree in Studio Art. There, she spent time developing her interdisciplinary practise at the graduate level. In 2011, La Melia received a master's degree in Fine Art, specializing in Studio Art from the University of Guelph.

== Exhibitions ==
=== The Eyelash and the Monochrome (exhibition) ===
The Eyelash and the Monochrome shares a title with the 2018 text published by Talonbooks in Vancouver. The 2014 exhibition acted as a starting point for the text to be written, as it references many of the same multi-faceted themes such as Greek tragedy, teenage obsessions, the writings of Joyce Carol Oates, Mark Twain, Gertrude Stein or Yvonne Rainer. The act and object of writing is often folded into La Melia's artistic practice. For example, the titles of artworks are often lines from poems, drafts, or plays. Sculptures are the remnants of performances, walls are pages, paintings are also windows, and windows are doors. The work in this show functionally blurs the boundaries between artistic media, collapsing the historical hierarchies between them. Instead, La Melia's exhibition cohesively glues together histories of the artist's life; including the imagined parts of it. As the title of the show and book suggests, La Melia is thinking about the presence of absence, and what nuances may spring from these interstitial spaces.

=== Broom Emotion ===
Broom Emotion is a solo exhibition of La Melia's artwork curated by Frank Balland in Paris at Galerie Anne Barrault in 2017. This show, much like all her shows, takes poetics as the starting point of her artistic process. In relation to Broom Emotion, Balland describes the invitational image as of a comb gliding through hair as being a central imaginative metaphor for many underlying themes of the exhibition. “It starts with the comb’s teeth, having streaked the wet hair, greased with the gel agglutinating on the wooden handle, like sticky slobber, thick foam. There is too much of it, and it leaks from the body, through its lifeless ends, pushed out by the sweep of the hand, both firm and delicate,” says Balland. Broom Emotion grapples with witches, women with brooms, domestic activities, social relationships, literature, art, cinema, and dreams.

=== The pigeon looks for death in the space between the needle and the haystack ===
The pigeon looks for death in the space between the needle and the haystack is the first solo exhibition by La Melia at Unit 17 in Vancouver. The show and artworks come also from a group show, Garden Gossip, at the Walter Phillips Gallery in Banff, Canada. The exhibition contains the artwork 'Self Defense' which refers to inter-species connection and mediation between humans, plants, and animals. The work is made up of a collection of painted works in basins that are all hung up on striped posts. Hou describes these paintings as “haiku sized”, which references La Melia's inter-disciplinary approach to art making that takes creative writing texts as central to her practice. La Melia also enlists water-jet cut mirrors within the installation that serve as a method for viewers to analyze their complicity towards self-identifying with art-objects. According to Hou, the mirrors play a central role to his reading of the exhibition because their reflections expose the fact that “our complicity with the art-object-becoming-social is embellished with personal vanity in our complicity with the viewer-becoming-more-beautiful.” The exhibition functions as a spatial poem, where the movements of any viewer may write another passage.

== Written works ==
=== Oral Like Cloaks, Dialect. ===
Oral Like Cloaks, Dialect. is a collection of writings by La Melia that contains writings, scripts, plays, poems, experimental prose, and other forms of creative texts spanning back to the artist's early career in 2005. The text was originally published in 2016 as Oral Like Cloaks, Dialect. Selected Writings 2005–2015 by Publication Studio in Vancouver, but was republished in 2018 by Blank Cheque Press with additional texts and an updated foreword by the artist. The texts in Oral Like Cloaks, Dialect. reference the La Melia's interests which include Hollywood cinema, literature, costume history, and insect anatomy. La Melia exercises her nuances understanding of dialects between language and vibration, emotions and signifiers. Oral Like Cloaks, Dialect. expresses the texture of speaking, the vibration of meaning, and the pulses of language.

=== The Eyelash and the Monochrome (book) ===
The Eyelash and the Monochrome is La Melia's first major collection of poetry, published in 2018 by Talonbooks in Vancouver. This book shares a title with the 2014 exhibition at the Mercer Union Gallery in Toronto. The title of the text describes an image of writer's block that plagued La Melia during the process of writing a text to accompany her 2013 exhibition entitled ‘Lot’ in Vancouver. The title evokes the image of an empty document on a computer screen, the only content is the blinking cursor. This cursor, which La Melia imagines as being the length of an eyelash, ‘blinks’ endlessly and repetitiously until it becomes the taunting wink of the computer itself. The collection of poems evokes this image by weaving together various forms of writing that may not traditionally be considered to amalgamate into a cohesive literary structure. However, the book gathers poems, performative texts, images, illustrations, and parallel texts. The Eyelash and the Monochrome is a genre defying text that functions both as a collection of poetry as well as an artist book.

== Selected group exhibitions ==
- Vancouver Special Triennale: Ambivalent Pleasures. Vancouver Art Gallery, Vancouver, Canada. 2016.
- Kamias Triennale. Quezon City, Philippines. 2017.
- Johnny Suede. Damien and the Love Guru, Brussels, Belgium. 2017.
- Garden Gossip. Walter Phillips Gallery, Banff, Canada. 2017.
- Soot. Unit 17, Vancouver, Canada. 2017.
- Pastoral Love. Lucas Hirsch, Düsseldorf, Germany. 2019.
- Town + Country: Narratives of Property and Capital, Morris and Helen Belkin Art Gallery, Vancouver.

== Selected solo exhibitions ==
- Table of Contents (Accompanying Poem). Toronto, Canada. 2011.
- Neck of Thirsty Flower. Exercise, Vancouver, Canada. 2012.
- Lot. The Apartment. Vancouver, Canada. 2014.
- The Eyelash and the Monochrome. Mercer Union, Toronto, Canada. 2014.
- Innocence at Home. CSA Projects, Vancouver, Canada. 2015.
- Broom Emotion. Galerie Anne Baurrault, Paris, France. 2017.
- The pigeon looks for death in the space between the needle and the haystack. Unit 17, Vancouver, Canada. 2018.
- Pet Parasite. Franz Kaka, Toronto, Canada. 2019.
- Saint Agatha’s Stink Script. Galerie Anne Baurrault, Paris, France. 2019.
- Rust Daughters, Say It With Flowers. Art Gallery of Grande Prairie, Grande Prairie, Canada. 2019.
- Ozone Gleaners. Project Pangee, Montreal, Canada. 2020.
- Palermo Microonde. Villa Vertua Masolo, Commune di Milano Nova, Italy. 2020.

== Awards and residencies ==
=== 2014 RBC Canadian Painting Competition (National Winner) ===
La Melia was selected as the national winner above fourteen other finalists of the 16th Annual RBC Canadian Painting Competition, a title which is also accompanied by $25 000 purchase prize of her artwork. The work which was selected and purchased is entitled Hanging On To the Part, which moved the jury because of the work's use of abstraction and narrative to portray the mythology of feminine archetypes as well as personal narratives – all within the formal qualities of the painting. Jill Burch, the CEO of the Canadian Art Foundation and publisher of Canadian Art magazine at the time, said the following in regard to La Melia's award, “With a mandate to create greater visibility and appreciation for Canada’s extraordinary artistic talent – both at home and abroad – the Canadian Art Foundation is thrilled to partner with RBC on this initiative… This year’s winners will no doubt continue to do us proud in the years ahead."

=== 2015 Sobey Art Award Longlist Recipient (West Coast & Yukon) ===
La Melia was nominated to represent the West Coast & Yukon for the 2015 Sobey Art Award in Canada. The Sobey Art Award is an annual award that celebrates Canada's most exciting young artists and provides heavy financial support to the winners. The top prize winner receives a $100 000 award, each of the shortlisted artists receive a $25 000 award, and the longlisted artists receive a $2 000 award. This award is one of the most impactful awards for young contemporary artists in Canada, and provides much visibility and publicity for both the artists as well as the Arts in an international context.

=== 2019 Art Gallery of Grande Prairie Artist Residency ===
La Melia partook in the Artist in Residency program at the Art Gallery of Grande Prairie, in Grande Prairie, Alberta. The exhibition, which was produced as a product of the residency, was entitled Rust Daughters, Say It With Flowers. The show was concerning the feminine unconscious of the spaces and histories of the Peace Region of Northern Alberta. Specifically, La Melia explores the relationship of Euphemia McNaught and Evy McBryan and their impact on the historical artistic community of the region. With these histories as inspirational research for the show and artworks, La Melia produces Corduroy Road which uses the technique of frottage and rubbing to transfer the indexical history of the space into La Melia's own practise. The act of frottage becomes a writing tool. It is an imprint of time and space that unveils the hidden language of the unwritten, the unread, and the still to be written.

=== Listed notable awards and residencies ===
- 2008 Mary Plumb Blade Award
- 2008 JackPine Press Publishing Grant
- 2010 SSHRC, Joseph-Armand Bombardier Canada Scholarship
- 2014 RBC Canadian Painting Competition (National Winner)
- 2014 TWP Writers in Residence
- 2014 Mountain School for the Arts, Los Angeles
- 2015 Sobey Art Award Longlist Recipient (West Coast & Yukon)
- 2017 Triangle Residency, Marseille, France
- 2017 Brink Award Short List
- 2017 Contemporary Art Society Emerging Artist Short List
- 2019 Art Gallery of Grande Prairie Artist Residency
