= Aaron Carpenter (artist) =

Canadian visual artist

Aaron Carpenter (born 1975) is a Canadian visual artist based in Vancouver, British Columbia noted for his interest in language, representation, replication, and authorship. Carpenter's work has come to prominence through a series of exhibitions and projects at the Vancouver Art Gallery, Lawrence Eng Gallery, Helen Pitt Gallery, Ministry of Casual Living, Artspeak, Or Gallery, Paul Petro Special Projects Space, Dalhousie Art Gallery, and Neon Gallery. He was also previously involved as a curator at the Bodgers' and Kludgers' Co-operative Art Parlour.
