= Rebecca Brewer =

Canadian multi-disciplinary artist

Rebecca Brewer (born 1983) is a Canadian multi-disciplinary artist. Brewer works in painting, textiles and printmaking. The work of Rebecca Brewer is an investigation into painterly abstraction drawing from visual histories of feminism, occultism, and alternative medicine. She works primarily in oil on canvas and also produces large-scale, two-sided felted wool compositions, typically hung suspended from the ceiling. Her felted works, in their scale and composition reference the histories of tapestry and heraldry.

== Early life ==
Brewer was born in Tokyo, Japan. In 2007, Brewer graduated from Emily Carr Institute of Art and Design, where she received her Bachelor of Fine Arts. In 2012, Brewer received her Masters of Fine Art at Bard College in upstate New York, USA.

== Solo exhibitions ==
- Nine Paintings of Ayn Rand, Exercise Gallery, Vancouver (2012)
- The Written Face, Catriona Jeffries, Vancouver (2014)
- Rebecca Brewer, Catriona Jeffries, Vancouver (2016)

== Awards ==
Brewer was the recipient of the 13th annual RBC Canadian Painting Competition, a $25,000 CAD award. The title of the winning work by Brewer was 'Beuys painting', Oil on panel, 42 x 47 inches (2010).

== Published works ==
Contributor to Art Cities of the Future by Reid Shier, London: Phaidon Press, 2013
