= Mélanie Rocan =

Canadian painter (born 1980)

- Born: 1980; La Broquerie, Manitoba
- Education: Master of Fine Arts, Bachelor of Fine Arts
- Alma mater: Concordia University, University of Manitoba
- Known for: painter
- Awards: RBC Canadian Painting Competition
- Website: www.melanierocan.com

Mélanie Rocan (born 1980) is a Canadian artist from La Broquerie, Manitoba. She works mostly in various paint mediums. She also has been known to work in multimedia, especially when working collaboratively.

== Education ==
Rocan began her undergraduate education at the University of Ottawa in 1999, and received her Bachelor of Fine Arts with Honours from the University of Manitoba in 2003. Having gone on exchange to Glasgow School of Art in 2005, she received her Master of Fine Arts from Concordia University's painting program in 2008.

== Career ==
Besides her exhibition career, Rocan has held the Deep Bay Artists' Residency in 2014. During this residency, Rocan worked with other Two Six member, Shaun Morin, to create collaborative mixed media works.

Rocan is also an occasional professor for the University of Manitoba where she teaches drawing classes.

Rocan is a three time finalist in the RBC Canadian Painting Competition across Canada before its conclusion in 2019. She was a finalist in the Western division in 2006 and 2010, and in the Eastern division in 2007.

=== Two Six ===
Rocan is the youngest member and the only woman member of Two Six, also known as Two-sicks, a group of young artists founded in 2003 by recent graduates of the University of Manitoba. The group focused on collaborative art and street art.

== Style ==
Rocan most typically works with watercolour, acrylic, and oil paint on canvas with a method similar to free association. Rocan herself describes her work as "linger[ing] in between a darkness and a playfulness". She takes inspiration from the Symbolism movement, which grew out of Romanticism. Symbolism is a movement in which emotions were at the forefront of art. She is a figure painter, but puts more detail into her backgrounds to help tell the story of her subject. She uses familiar items such as bed frames, floral wallpaper, and tire swings to evoke memories and a feeling of timelessness.

In her work with the art collective Two Six, she uses other media in addition to paint. She makes use of "stretched fabric pieces" and ribbons tied "around a telephone pole or fence post".
