= Joani Tremblay =

Canadian painter

Joani Tremblay (born 1984) is a Canadian painter living and working in Montreal, Quebec. Tremblay has exhibited internationally at venues including James Cohan Gallery, New York; Harper's, New York and Los Angeles; Marie-Laure Fleisch Gallery, Brussels; The Pit, Los Angeles, CA; Pangée, Montreal; 3331 Arts Chiyoda, Tokyo; and others. Joani Tremblay investigates the perception of place through oil painting. Tremblay paints from a constructed idea of place assembling images from a variety of sources, including advertisements, social media, and field research. The artist utilizes digital collage techniques, then paints the composition onto canvas, ultimately creating an image that oscillates between figuration and abstraction.

== Biography ==
Tremblay received her Bachelor in Visual Arts from Université du Québec à Montréal in 2012 and an MFA from Concordia University in 2017. Tremblay was the co-founder and former co-director of Projet Pangée, an artist-run gallery in Montreal. Tremblay's works are featured in various public collections, including the RBC Art Collection, the Montreal City Art Collection, and the Mint Museum.

== Residencies and awards ==
- International Studio & Curatorial Program artist-in-residence, 2021, 2022
- Canada Council for the Arts: Explore and Create Research and Creation, grant recipient, 2017, 2022
- The New York Art Residency and Studios (NARS) Foundation, artist-in-residence, 2020
- The Elizabeth Greenshields Foundation grant recipient, 2018, 2020
- RBC Canadian Painting Competition shortlisted, 2017, 2018
- Residency Eastside International (ESXLA), artist-in-residence, 2018
- Master Research Fellowship Recipient, The Fonds de recherche du Québec - Société et culture, 2014-2016
- Residency 3331 Arts Chiyoda, Tokyo, artist-in-residence, 2014

== Publications ==
- Sorenson, Oli. "The Afterlife's Painting" Issue (Re)seeing Painting, Esse arts + opinions Magazine, Spring/Summer, 2021.
- Campbell, James D., "Joani Tremblay" Border Crossings Magazine, November, 2020.
- ArtMaze Magazine, Issue 20, 2020.
- Quirion, Jean-Michel. “(In)temporalité au consulat” Vie des arts, 2020.
- Delgado, Jérôme. “Ne rien produire, sinon des expos” Le Devoir, 2020.
- Letarte, Marie-Anne, “Joani Tremblay”, L’Inconvénient magazine, No. 78, 2019.
- Maake Magazine, Issue 9 curated by Hein Koh, 2019.
- Hedstierna, Snövit. “Matta formsqråk i ansqråk”, Cap&Design, Sweden, #2, 2017.
