= Jeanie Riddle (artist) =

Canadian artist (born 1969)

Jeanie Riddle (born 1969 in Montreal, Quebec) is a Montreal and Mexico City based artist. Her practice is grounded in a painting/object/installation hybrid. She was the founding director of Parisian Laundry (2005–17). Her work has been shown in NYC, Mexico City, Los Angeles, Berlin, Montreal, San Francisco, Toronto and Calgary.

== Life and education ==
Riddle was born in Montreal, Canada and lived part of her adult life in San Francisco, Ca before returning to complete her studies. Riddle obtained her MFA at Concordia University (2005) and was the recipient of the inaugural Yves Gaucher Award. She has attended residencies at El Sur, Mexico City, Casa Lü, Mexico City, Bemis Center, Omaha, Cite des arts Internationale, Paris, Triangle Arts, Brooklyn NY, and the Vermont Studio Center. Her work has been shown across Canada as well as in Mexico City, Brussels, Berlin, NYC and Paris. Her projects have been repeatedly supported by Canada Council for the Arts and the conseil des arts et lettres du Quebec. A professional cultural worker, Riddle was the founding director of Parisian Laundry where she established numerous artist’s careers. She has worked as a consultant, juror, educator and writer and presently, dedicates her time to her own established mid career practice. She currently lives and works in Montreal and Mexico City.

== Work ==
Riddle has a background in painting. Her tendency is towards minimalist abstraction; pursuing the objective of exhausting the potential in minimalist forms. Architecture also has a primary importance in her artistic concerns. Since 2002, Riddle has been developing a sculptural installation practice, which has enabled her to explore her interest in spaces that women are usually left to reflect upon. Through her installation practice Riddle seeks to negate the readability of object categories. She states: "It is in the process of assembling, and of making, that I arrive at a formal composition. Trained as a painter, I was always interested in the way everything comes together through the formal compositional gesture. I am now doing this with objects instead of painting." The artist creates installations in which she negotiates and reorganizes architectural space into an abstracted site by using domestic or ordinary materials to reconstitute a space.

== Exhibitions ==
=== Solo ===
- All of The Above, El Sur, Tlalpan, Mexico City, 2022https://www.elsurmx.art/jeanie-riddle
- Open Letter to The Women, Galerie Antoine Ertaskiran, 2018
- Single Family Home for Sale, TAP Art Space, 2018
- Tenor, McClure Gallery, 2012§ https://www.frieze.com/article/jeanie-riddle
- Jeanie Riddle, Winsor Gallery, Vancouver, 2010
- California, CIRCA, Montreal, 2009
- Black Paintings, Galerie Thérèse Dion, Montreal, 2007
- Everything Painted White With Color, YYZ Artist Outlet, Toronto (publication), 2006
- Floating Floors or Maybe Just a Pile of Love, Optica, Montreal, 2006
- Outside BlissCPD, The New Gallery, Calgary, 2005
- One Floor & One Model. Parisian Laundry, Montreal, 2005
- The Systematic Arrangement of Pretty and Other Accumulations, Centre des Arts Actuel SKOL, Montreal, 2004

=== Group ===
- Gestures of Comfort, Galerie Antoine Ertaskiran, 2019
- Entangled: Two Views on Contemporary Canadian Painting, Curated by Bruce Grenville and David Mac Millan (Catalogue), Vancouver Art Gallery, 2017 §https://www.vanartgallery.bc.ca/exhibitions/entangled
- RBC Canadian Painting Competition, Finalist Exhibition, Touring: National Gallery of Canada, Ottawa ON; Musée d’art contemporain de Montréal Montréal, QC; The Rooms, St. John's NL, Museum London, London ON, Power Plant, Toronto ON, Mendel Art Gallery, Saskatoon, SK; Art Galeery of Alberta, Edmonton AB; Contemporary Art Gallery, Vancouver BC, 2008.
- Beyond Feminism, women artists working in female iconography, Parisian Laundry, Montreal (catalogue), 2006.
- Garage/Pretty Garage, Alley Jaunt, Toronto, 2005.
- Paint! Bourget Gallery, Montreal, 2004.
- Forced Air, Montréal, Canada, 2004.
- 99 for 99, invited artist, Observatoire 4, Montreal, 2004.
