= Patrick Howlett =

Canadian visual artist

Patrick Howlett is a Canadian visual artist born in Toronto, Ontario. He is currently based in Montreal, Quebec. Howlett obtained a Bachelor of Fine Arts at Concordia University, Montreal in 1997 and completed a Master of Fine Arts at the University of Victoria in 2006. In 2008, Howlett was a finalist in the RBC Canadian Painting Competition. His internationally exhibited work typically involves a commentary on technology and the digital age that results in multimedia paintings and drawings, and is often centred on the relationship between an image and a title. His work has been presented at the National Gallery of Canada, Ottawa; Musée d’art contemporain, Montréal; The Power Plant, Toronto; Art Gallery of Edmonton, Edmonton; Contemporary Art Gallery, Vancouver; Atelierhof Kreuzberg, Berlin; Maison de la culture Côtes-des-Neiges, Montréal; Khyber Institute for Contemporary Arts, Halifax.

== Art Practice ==
Howlett's artistic practice is careful, methodical and deliberate. He works in a variety of media, including tempera paint, watercolour paint, silverpoint, coloured pencil and charcoal. He is well known for his geometric abstract paintings and drawings, which are often compact, dense and intensely layered. Howlett works with traditional surface treatments, media and brushwork that go back to the Renaissance. Howlett also incorporates a digital element into his work: he generates Google image searches for inspiration and source material which he then synthesizes into the colour, shape and composition of his paintings.
