= Andrea Bolley =

Canadian painter

- Born: 1949 (age 76–77); Guelph, Ontario, Canada
- Education: University of Windsor
- Known for: Paper paintings
- Style: Colour Field painter, Abstract artist
- Website: www.andreabolley.com

Andrea Bolley (born 1949) is a Canadian abstract painter based in Toronto.

== Work ==
Bolley's paintings are abstract canvases which take their inspiration from Colour Field painters such as Helen Frankenthaler, Clyfford Still and Jules Olitski. Her work has been praised for the complex treatment of surface and depth. Bolley has made distinctive use of paper, both as a tool for the application of paint and in her "paper paintings", which incorporate a paper collage element. Bolley participated in the Art Gallery of Ontario's Artists with their Work program in the 1970s, for which she presented art workshops throughout the province of Ontario. In the 1970s and 1980s, Bolley worked closely with the painter Tony Calzetta and the two artists' work was paired in a number of exhibitions.

== Exhibitions ==
Bolley's first major exhibition was held at the Pollock Gallery in 1977, and received critical attention for the artist's seriousness and ability to establish her own expressive voice within the tradition of colour field painting. A retrospective exhibition of Bolley's work was held at the Agnes Etherington Art Centre in 1981. Solo exhibitions of her work have also been held at the Thames Art Gallery (2004), Gallery 132, Toronto (1994-2003), Gallery One (1984-1986), and the Pollock Gallery (1977-1980).

== Collections ==
Bolley's work is in major public and private collections including the Art Gallery of Windsor, Canada Council Art Bank, Imperial Oil, Labatt's of Canada, and Toronto Dominion Bank.
