= Rick Leong =

Canadian artist (born 1973)

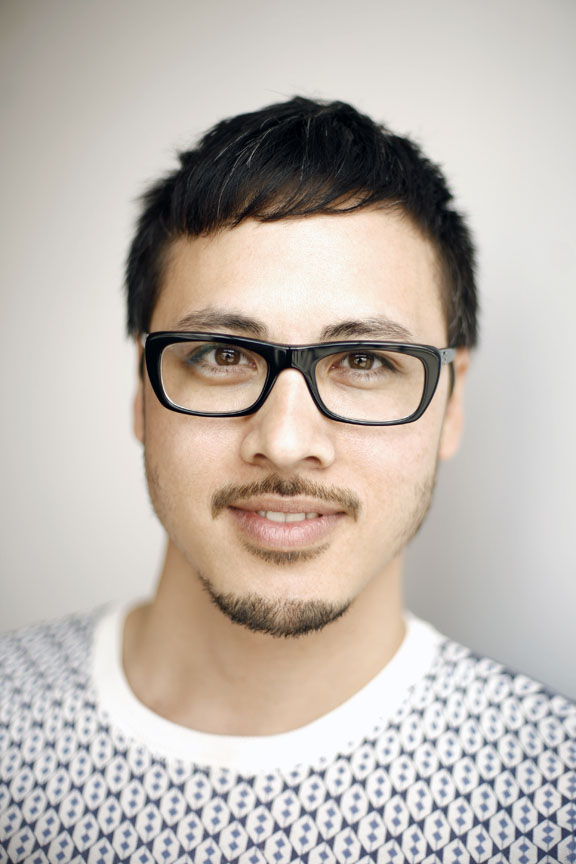

Richard Taryn Leong (born in 1973 in Burnaby, British Columbia, Canada) is a Canadian artist working primarily in painting and drawing. He is represented by Parisian Laundry in Montreal.

== Education ==
Leong obtained his BFA from the University of Victoria. Leong obtained his master's degree in Fine Arts from Concordia University in 2007. His thesis was acquired by the Montreal Museum of Fine Arts.

== Work ==
Leong's work focuses on landscapes and the dynamic between the objective and the subjective.

Notable exhibitions include Realities Folies at Open Space, Victoria, British Columbia (2015); Nemophily at Evans Contemporary, Peterborough, Ontario (2014); Sleepwalking Daydreams at Parisian Laundry, Montreal, Quebec (2014); Sublimation of Self at Anna Leonowens Gallery, Halifax, Nova Scotia (2012); Hybrid Vigour at Parisian Laundry, Montreal (2012); The Phenomenology of Dusk at the Art Gallery of Greater Victoria, (2012); Space & Time at Parisian Laundry, Montreal (2011); La terre est bleue comme une orange at the Montreal Museum of Fine Arts (2010); The Third Meaning at RH Gallery, New York (2010); The Wilderness at McClure Gallery, Montreal (2010); I am Nature at Parisian Laundry, Montreal, and La biennale de Montréal, (2009). In 2008, he was a finalist in the Royal Bank of Canada's Painting Competition, touring at venues such as the National Gallery of Canada, the Power Plant (Toronto), and the Contemporary Art Gallery (Vancouver).

== Collections ==
Leong's work can be found in private and corporate collections including the Canada Council Art Bank, the Canadian Art Foundation, the Musée national des beaux-arts du Québec, as well as the permanent collection at The Montreal Museum of Fine Arts. Other collections include the Aldo Group, Collect' Art, Senvest and Caisse de Depot.

== Bibliography ==
- Rick Leong: The Wilderness
- Rick Leong and David Six
- BNL MTL 09
- Preview David Six and Rick Leong
- Rick Leong: artist profile
- East Meets West: Painter Rick Leong's work is an enchanted blend of the mythic and visceral
- Rick Leong, Parisian Laundry
- Paintings by Rick Leong
- Ten artists first-time buyers should invest in now
