= Dionne Lake =

Lake in Nunavut, Canada

- Location within Nunavut
- Location: Kivalliq Region, Nunavut
- Coordinates: 61°12′N 94°36′W
- Basin countries: Canada
- Surface elevation: 27 m (89 ft)
- Settlements: Arviat

Dionne Lake (variant: DionneLake) is a lake in Kivalliq Region, Nunavut, Canada. It is located 32.8 km (20.4 mi) west of the community of Arviat. The area is frequented by caribou.

== Notable residents ==
Dionne Lake was home at one time to Inuk sculptor John Pangnark.
