= Etienne Zack =

Canadian-American painter (born 1976)

- Born: July 22, 1976 (age 49); Montreal, Quebec
- Citizenship: Canadian-American
- Occupation: Painter
- Website: https://www.etiennezack.com/

Etienne Zack (born 1976, Montreal, Canada) is a Canadian-American painter. He studied at the Emily Carr University of Art and Design in Vancouver earning his diploma in 2000, and attended Concordia University in 1997.

Zack's works often explore themes of architecture, power, and the construction of history.

== Artistic focus ==
Etienne Zack's early paintings of Vancouver are connected to urban environments and socio-political commentary. His works challenge the dominant economic structures of these landscapes.

In 2014, artist and art critic Dion Kliner highlighted Zack's exploration of the constructed nature of history, stating that his work examines how both events and objects are selectively preserved or erased. In his 2016 solo exhibition at the Esker Foundation, curated by Naomi Potter, he focused on systems of control, institutional power, and the reconsideration of history and text.

== Career highlights ==
In 2004, his work was included in the East International exhibition in the UK at Norwich School of Art, curated by Neo Rauch and Gerd Harry Lybke. This was followed by solo exhibitions, including one in 2006 at the Bergen Kunsthall in Norway, curated by Solveig Østebø, and a duo exhibition with Jorge Queiroz at the Thomas Dane Gallery in London, England.

In Canada, Zack won the 2005 RBC Canadian Painting Competition and the Pierre-Ayot Prize from the City of Montreal in 2008.

His work was featured in the 2008 Québec Triennial at the Musée d’art contemporain de Montréal, which led to a solo survey exhibition at the museum in 2010, (with catalogue authored by Francois LeTourneux and Seamus Kealy). Zack also contributed a commissioned sculpture for the 2010 Vancouver Olympics. That same year, the Surrey Art Gallery in Canada held a survey exhibition of his work, curated by Jordan Strom.

In 2014, Zack was awarded the Emily Award from Emily Carr University.

His 2016 exhibition at the Esker Foundation in Calgary focused on his "book series" (2013–2016).This exhibition was accompanied by a catalogue featuring contributions by Naomi Potter, Travis Diehl, Carole Anne Klonarides, and Keith Wallace.

== Public collections ==
His works is part of numerous public and private institutional collections, including the following:

- National Gallery of Canada, Ottawa, Canada
- The Model Museum, Sligo, Ireland
- Vancouver Art Gallery, Vancouver, Canada,
- National Fine Arts Museum of Québec, Québec, Canada,
- Montreal Museum of Fine Arts, Montréal, Canada,
- Musée d’art contemporain de Montréal, Montréal, Canada,
- Global Affairs Canada,
- Caisse de dépôt et placement du Québec, Montréal, Canada
- Surrey Art Gallery, Surrey, Canada
- Glenbow Museum, Calgary, Canada
- Zabludowicz Collection, London, England
- Canada Council Art Bank, Canada,
- City of Montréal, Montréal, Canada
- Royal Bank of Canada Collection, Montréal-Toronto-Vancouver, Canada
- Loto-Québec, Montréal, Canada
- Giverny Capital Art Collection, Montreal, Canada

== Awards ==
RBC Canadian Painting Competition (National Competition)– 1st Prize 2005, Sustainable Arts Foundation, recipient 2021, Emily Award, Emily Carr University, Vancouver, Canada, 2014, City of Montréal Pierre-Ayot Prize – 1st Prize 2008, Brissenden Scholarship - 1999, Mary Catherine Gordon Memorial Scholarship - 1999.
