= Azadeh Elmizadeh =

Toronto based visual artist

Azadeh Elmizadeh (born 1987) is a visual artist currently based in Toronto.

== Career ==
Elmizadeh's practice focuses on painting and collage, drawing inspiration from Sufi cosmologies and Persian miniature painting. She received a Bachelor of Fine Art in Visual Communication and Graphic Design from the University of Tehran (2010), a Bachelor of Fine Arts from Ontario College of Art and Design in Drawing and Painting (2016), and a Master of Fine Art from the University of Guelph (2020). Elmizadeh has exhibited in solo and two-person exhibitions at the Tube Culture Hall in Milan, Italy (2023), the Southern Alberta Art Gallery in Lethbridge, Canada (2022), and the Franz Kaka in Toronto, Canada (2022). Notable group shows include Now I am a lake at Public Gallery in London, United Kingdom (2022), Crossings: Itineraries of Encounter at The Blackwood in Mississauga, Canada (2022), and Holding a line in your hand at Kamloops Art Gallery in Kamloops, Canada (2021). She was also awarded the Joseph Plaskett Award for Painting in 2020.

== Selected exhibitions ==
Solo and two-person exhibitions

- Madame, Madame (w. Laura Berger), Tube Culture Hall, Milan, IT (curated by Domenico de Chirico) (2023)
- Sister Seeds, Franz Kaka, Toronto, CA (2023)
- Soft Smoke (w. Ella Gonzales) Southern Alberta Art Gallery, Lethbridge, CA (2022)
- Subtle Bodies, Franz Kaka, Toronto, CA (2020)

Group exhibitions

- Forward from wherever you are, Europa, New York, NY (2023)
- Crossings: Itineraries of Encounter, The Blackwood, Mississauga, CA (curated by Noor Bhangu) (2022)
- Now I am a lake, Public Gallery, London, UK (curated by Rose Nestler) (2022)
- Halcyon and On and On, Franz Kaka, Toronto, CA (2021)
- Holding a line in your hand, Kamloops Art Gallery, CA (curated by Charo Neville) (2021)
- Preface, Boarding House Gallery, Guelph, CA (2019)
- Cognizance, Birch Contemporary, Toronto, CA (2019)
- New Energy, Boarding House Gallery, Guelph, CA (2018)
- Faraway, So Close, 26 Art Space, Toronto, CA (2017)
- Why the &%#! Do You Paint? All the Colour, Gladstone Hotel, Toronto, CA (2017)
- Why the &%#! Do You Paint? Go Figure, Gladstone Hotel, Toronto, CA (2016)
- Walnut Studios, Walnut Contemporary, Toronto, CA (2016)
- OCADU 101TH GradeEx, Toronto, CA (2016)
