= Janet Werner =

Canadian artist

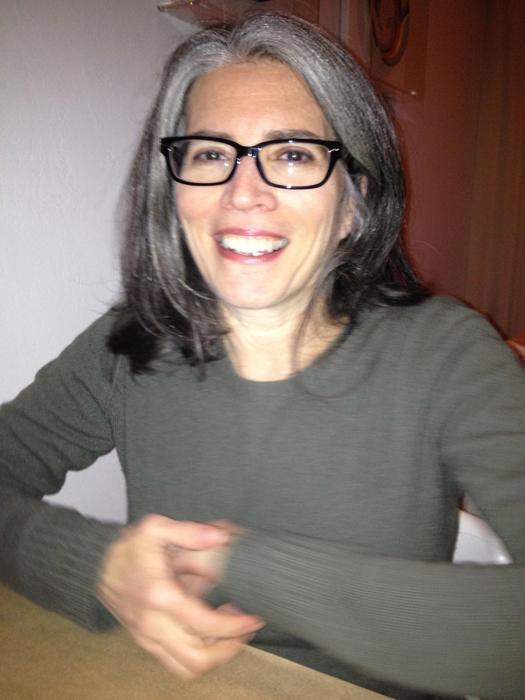
- Born: 1959 (age 66–67); Winnipeg, Manitoba
- Known for: visual artist
- Movement: fictional portraits

Janet Werner (born 1959) is a Canadian artist based in Montreal. Her work is known for its incisive and playful depictions of female figures, raising questions about the nature of the subject in painting.

== Biography ==
Janet Werner was born in 1959 in Winnipeg, Manitoba, and currently resides in Montreal, Quebec, where she teaches at Concordia University. Werner studied at the Maryland Institute College of Art in Baltimore, and, in 1985 she received her Bachelor of Fine Arts. Later, she studied at Yale University in New Haven, Connecticut, where she received her Masters of Fine Arts in 1987. From 1987 to 1999 she taught painting and drawing at the University of Saskatchewan, in Saskatoon, Saskatchewan.

== Work ==
Werner is known primarily for her large scale fictional portraits. She has been focusing on the genre since 1997. Werner explores themes of subjectivity and desire by producing composites of found images. Recent paintings have explored painting's relationship to ideas of realism and the photograph. It can be said that the artist uses painting to deconstruct the ubiquity of the photographic image.

== Collections ==
- Musée national des beaux-arts du Québec
- Leonard and Bina Ellen Art Gallery, Montréal
- Mackenzie Art Gallery
- Regina Owens Art Gallery, Sackville, New Brunswick
- Remai Modern (Formerly, Mendel Art Gallery), Saskatoon
- Dunlop Art Gallery, Regina
- Owens Art Gallery, Mount Allison University, Sackville
- Winnipeg Art Gallery
- Kenderdine Art Gallery, University of Saskatchewan, Saskatoon

== Exhibitions ==
Werner exhibited at the Art Gallery of Guelph in 2019.

=== Selected exhibitions ===
- 1989, Paintings, AKA Gallery, Saskatoon, Saskatchewan.
- 1989 Rehearsing the World, Plug In Inc, Winnipeg, Manitoba.
- 1990. 1990 Paintings, Garnet Press Gallery, Toronto, Ontario.
- 1991 Reflections on Language and the Appearance of Things, Mendel Art Gallery, Saskatoon, Saskatchewan.
- 1991 Reflections on Language and the Appearance of Things, Illingworth Kerr Gallery, Calgary, Alberta.
- 1992 Reflections on Language and the Appearance of Things, Dunlop art Gallery, Regina, Saskatchewan.
- 1994 Lingua, la Central, Galerie Powerhouse, Montreal, Quebec.
- 1995 Scat, Galerie Axe NEO 7, Hull, Quebec.
- 1995 figures and fields, Sir Wilfred Grenfell Gallery, Corner Brook, Newfoundland.
- 1995, Janet Werner / Katherine Sellars* Eye Level Gallery, Halifax, Nova Scotia.
- 1996, Slow Pictures, Robert Birch Gallery, Toronto.
- 1997, Listen, AKA Gallery, Saskatoon, Saskatchewan.
- 1997, Trance *, Mendel Gallery, Saskatoon, Saskatchewan (catalogue).
- 1997, Lucky, Southern Alberta Art Gallery, Lethbridge, Alberta (catalogue)
- 1998, Lucky, Owens Art Gallery, Sackville, New Brunswick.
- 1998, trust, Optica, Montreal, Quebec.
- 1999, Janet Werner, Paul kuhn Gallery, Calgary, Alberta.
- 1999, Janet Werner, Tableau Vivant Gallery, Toronto, Ontario.
- 1999, trust, Art Gallery of Mississauga, Mississauga, Ontario.
- 1999, Janet Werner, Tableau Vivant Gallery, Toronto, Ontario.
- 1999, Janet Werner, Paul Kuhn Gallery, Calgary, Alberta.
- 2018, The Splits, Anat Ebgi, Los Angeles, California
- 2023, Call Me When You Start Wearing Red, Anat Ebgi, Los Angeles, California

== Bibliography ==
- Werner, Janet; Grenville, Bruce; Mendel Art Gallery (1991). Janet Werner: reflections on language and the appearance of things. Saskatoon: Mendel Art Gallery. ISBN 9780919863668. OCLC 62913529.
- Laing, Carol (1997). Janet Werner : lucky. Werner, Janet, 1959-, Southern Alberta Art Gallery., Owens Art Gallery. Lethbridge, Alta.: Southern Alberta Art Gallery. ISBN 0921613857. OCLC 45207344.
- Werner, Janet; O'Neill, Colleen; Sir Wilfred Grenfell College Art Gallery (1998). Janet Werner. St. John's, Nfld.: Division of University Relations for Sir Wilfred Grenfell College Art Gallery. ISBN 9780929025315. OCLC 51296428.
- Traer, Patrick; Baerwaldt, Wayne; Ring, Dan; Werner, Janet; Mendel Art Gallery (1998). Trance, Patrick Traer, Janet Werner: [exhibition catalogue. Saskatoon: Mendel Art Gallery. ISBN 9781896359182. OCLC 39354947.
- Werner, Janet; Art Gallery of Mississauga; Thames Art Gallery (Chatham, Ont.) (2000). Janet Werner: trust. Mississauga, Ont.: Art Gallery of Mississauga. ISBN 9781895436365. OCLC 50239146.
- Werner, Janet; Baert, Renee; Ottawa Art Gallery (2002). Janet Werner: since first I cast eyes on you = depuis mon premier regard sur toi. Ottawa: Ottawa Art Gallery = Galerie d'art d'Ottawa. ISBN 9781895108910. OCLC 62535428.
- Baert, Renee; Liane and Danny Taran Gallery; Galerie Liane et Danny Taran (2007). Janet Werner. Montreal: SBC / Galerie d'art contemporain. ISBN 9780920473702. OCLC 297155730.
- Werner, Janet; Parisian Laundry (Montréal, Québec) (2008). Janet Werner: too much happiness. Montréal, Qc: Parisian Laundry. ISBN 9780973942255. OCLC 297156102.
- Archer, Kent; et al. (2013). Janet Werner : another perfect day. Saskatoon. ISBN 9780888805874. OCLC 861535394.
