= Dionne Simpson =

Jamaican Canadian textile artist

- Born: 1972 (age 53–54); Jamaica
- Awards: RBC Canadian Painting Competition (2004)

Dionne Simpson (born 1972) is a Jamaican Canadian textile artist based in Toronto, Ontario.

== Early life and education ==
Simpson was born in Jamaica in 1972. She emigrated to Canada with her family as an infant. Simpson studied at the Cooper Union in the late nineties and graduated from the Ontario College of Art and Design in 2000.

== Career ==
Simpson's work features a West African textile technique that involves pulling thread through canvas. Within the spaces the thread pulling creates she adds pigments to further embellish the canvas.

In 2004, Simpson was the first national winner of the RBC Canadian Painting Competition. She won the award for her piece Urban e_Scape 13.
