= Jennifer Lefort =

Canadian artist (born 1976)

- Born: 1976 (age 49–50); Montreal, Quebec
- Occupation: Artist
- Website: jenniferlefort.com

Jennifer Lefort (born 1976) is a Canadian artist based in Gatineau, Quebec. Her paintings explore abstraction with their manipulation of colour, narrative and sensation. Her list of solo exhibitions includes shows at the Parisian Laundry in Montreal, the Drabinsky Gallery in Toronto, the Maison de la culture NDG and Montreal and more. She has won many awards for her work including the Royal Bank of Canada Painting Award (Semi-finalist, 2007) and the Joseph Plaskett Foundation Award (2005).

== Education ==
Born in Montreal, Quebec, Lefort earned a BFA from Concordia University in Montreal and an MFA from York University in 2006.

== Work ==
Jennifer Lefort's painting explores approaches to abstraction in terms of the manipulation of colour, narrative and sensation. The artist decomposes objects found in everyday life to exploit their material qualities and paint them to recompose them otherwise.

Her work is included in the Musée national des beaux-arts du Québec.

Lefort's work was included as part of Ottawa's Capital Pride 2022 campaign to support 2SLGBTQ+ artists.

== Awards ==
- Royal Bank of Canada Painting Award (Semi-finalist, 2007)
- Joseph Plaskett Foundation Award (2005)
- Henry Mills Prize (2002)
- Heinz Jordan Painting Prize (2001)

== Solo exhibitions ==
- "Make-Believe," at Parisian Laundry in Montreal (2010)
- "After Berlin" at Parisian Laundry in Montreal (2007)
- "Spots & Fabulisms," at Drabinsky Gallery in Toronto (2006)
- "Pretend You’re Here, Galerie Trois Points" (2006)
- "Juicy" at Galerie Trois Points in Montreal (2004)
- "The Systematic Arrangement of Pretty," at SKOL Centre des arts actuels in Montreal (2004)
- "Titillation," at Maison de la culture NDG, Montreal (2003)
- "Lined Sofa A Salon of New Work" in Montreal (2002)
- "Candy & Tar," at Annexe Belgo in Montreal (2002)

== Bibliography ==
- Des genealogies qui parlent
- Small Comets, Gary Michael Dault, The Globe and Mail, September 3, 2005 pR9
- Meredith Carruthers and Jeanie Riddle, After Berlin, Exhibition catalogue, 2007.
- Le legs de Gaucher, Jérôme Delgado, La Presse, July 27, 2002 pD12
- A fitting Tribute, Henry Lehmann, The Gazette, July 20, 2002 pI3
- Personalities mesh, Kevin D'Abramo, The Concordian, March 27, 2002 p9
