= Artspeak =

Computer language

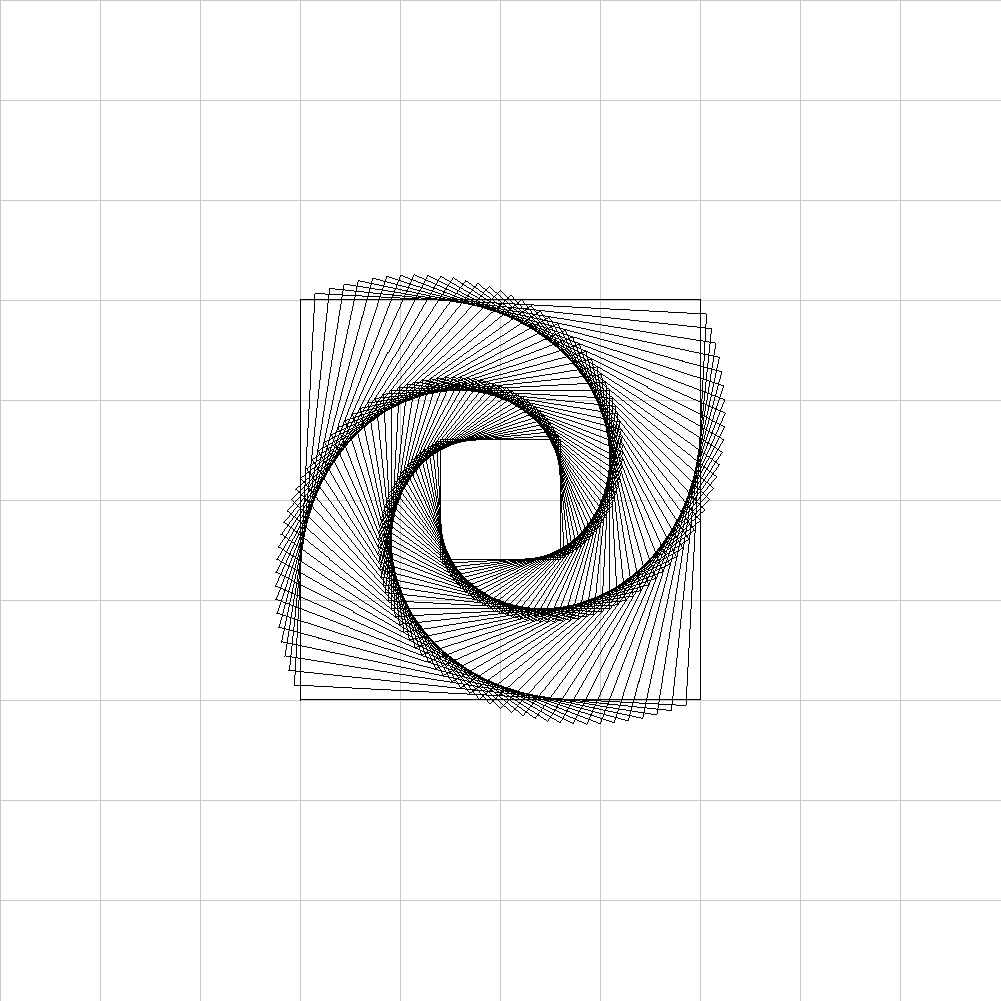
Output from a simple Artspeak program

Artspeak is a computer language conceived by Jacob T. Schwartz at New York University's Courant Institute of Mathematical Sciences. Until 2011, the only known compiler/interpreter was written for the CDC 6600, a mainframe computer. In order to program in Artspeak on the CDC 6600, one had to use punch cards and utilize batch processing.

Artspeak was a specialized language that worked with a single-color graphical plotter to produce graphical output on a 10-inch by 10-inch sheet of paper. It used simple, English language-based statements to draw elemental shapes, including circles, points, text, and many types of curves (including lines).

In 2011, Ron Schnell (author of Dunnet) found an old draft manual for the language, and after discovering that the language ceased to exist, wrote it from scratch in Python.

The new version of Artspeak outputs to a computer monitor, as opposed to a plotter, and allows local and server storage of Artspeak programs. There are other differences from the original Artspeak, all of which are detailed in the reference guide.

== General references ==
- Ron Schnell's 2011 implementation of an Artspeak Interpreter
- Henry Mullish (1974): The art of programming ARTSPEAK: A computer graphics language
