= Philippa Jones =

- Born: Philippa Marie Jones; 1982 (age 43–44); Aylesbury, Buckinghamshire, England
- Education: University College Falmouth
- Known for: Painter, graphic artist, installation artist

Philippa Marie Jones (born 1982) is a British artist and curator based in St. John's, Newfoundland and Labrador. Her practice includes printmaking, painting, animation, and interactive installations, to explore constructed realities and active myth making. She is notable as the first artist from Newfoundland and Labrador to be included in the National Gallery of Canada contemporary biennial.

== Early life ==
Jones was born in Aylesbury, Buckinghamshire. She completed a Bachelors of Fine Art and a Masters of Art in Interactive Art & Design at University College Falmouth (now Falmouth University).

== Career ==
In 2012, Jones was included in the exhibition "New Romantics" at The Rooms, alongside Photographer Anthony Redpath and artist Kelly Richardson, curated by Bruce Johnson.

When describing Jones' work in 'New Romantics,' author Katie Bethune Leamen wrote: "Jones creates feelings of physical displacement and wizard-like communion with animals." Her work was then featured in a solo exhibition entitled "MIRIAD," the result of a three-month residency at The Rooms as part of the Elbow Room Residency Program. The exhibition was curated by Mireille Eagan.

MIRIAD (Ministry of Intuitive Research in Imagined and Actual Discoveries) is a fictional scientific organization whose directive is to "contribute to known truths through imaginative exploration." Through playful scenarios where individuals adopt roles, participants "formulate hypotheses free from preconceptions, initiating research by imagining truths, then seeking to substantiate these imaginings through the discovery of actual artifacts and specimens."

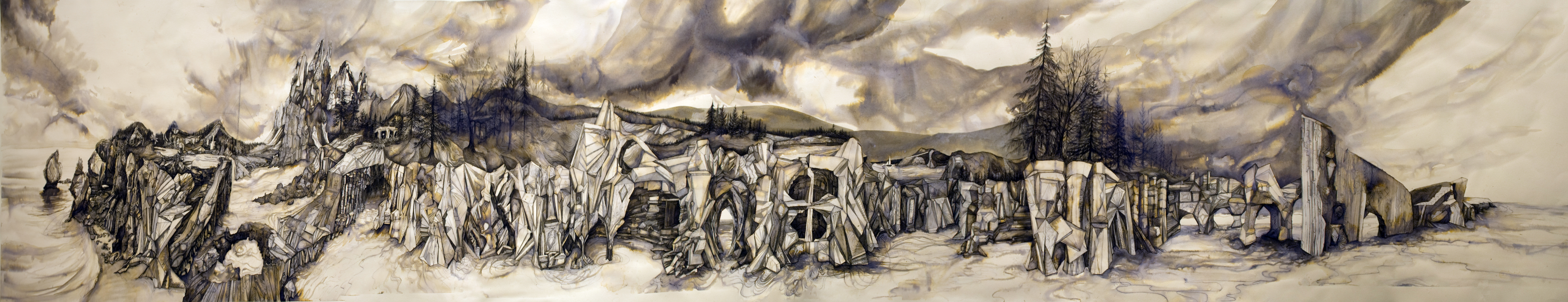
MIRIAD Island (2012), pen and ink wash on wove paper, 71.5 × 456.5 cm. Collection of National Gallery of Canada, Ottawa.

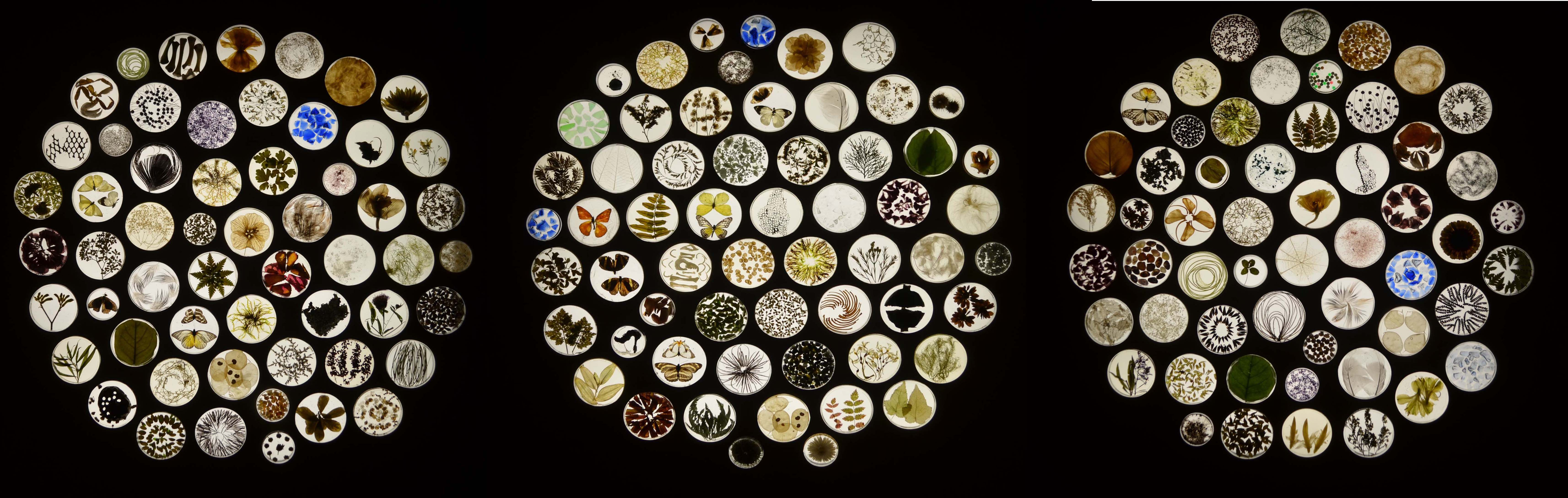
Specimen circles (2012)

Acting as a lead researcher, Jones constructed a representation of an island as other individuals acting as experts imagined it collectively, translating the results of their research into sculpture, installation, and drawings including the 15-foot pen and ink drawing "MIRIAD Island."

The drawing, and the process of creating it, was described as "an unfolding linear landscape consisting of myriad geometric shapes and expressive washes in subtly monochromatic tones. ... The drawing was allowed to unfold intuitively, starting with a clearly imagined horizontal structure inspired by the vastness of the Newfoundland landscape. The artist deliberately had no end vision for the final island, wanting instead to see how it would grow and attempting to keep herself (in her own words) 'in a state of continuous imaginative possibilities.'"

In 2014, the National Gallery of Canada collected Jones' work "MIRIAD Island." This piece was exhibited in ‘Shine a Light: Canadian Biennial 2014’ at The National Gallery of Canada and was curated by Josée Drouin-Brisebois, Greg Hill, Andrea Kunard, Jonathan Shaughnessy and Rhiannon Vogl. As the curatorial text for the National Gallery of Canada described: "The resulting drawing shows both her automatic way of working and the physical results of this creative and research-based practice."

In 2016, Jones' piece "Silence" was shown at "Writing Topography," the Marion McCain Exhibition of Contemporary Atlantic Art' curated by Corinna Ghaznavi at the Beaverbrook Art Gallery. Later that same year, Jones' project, 'A Study into the Phenomena of the Newfoundland Bubble' was exhibited in ‘Land of Mirrors: ongoing experiments in Newfoundland‘ at Eastern Edge Art Gallery, curated by Mary MacDonald alongside artists Will Gill, Jerry Ropson, Michael Flaherty and Jason Wells.

Author Lisa Moore wrote of this work: "Philippa Jones's installation ... captures the isolation of living in a town on an island in the North Atlantic, especially under the smothering, claustrophobic blanket of winter, when air travel is often thwarted and even a trip to the bar becomes a mythic voyage".

== Art ==
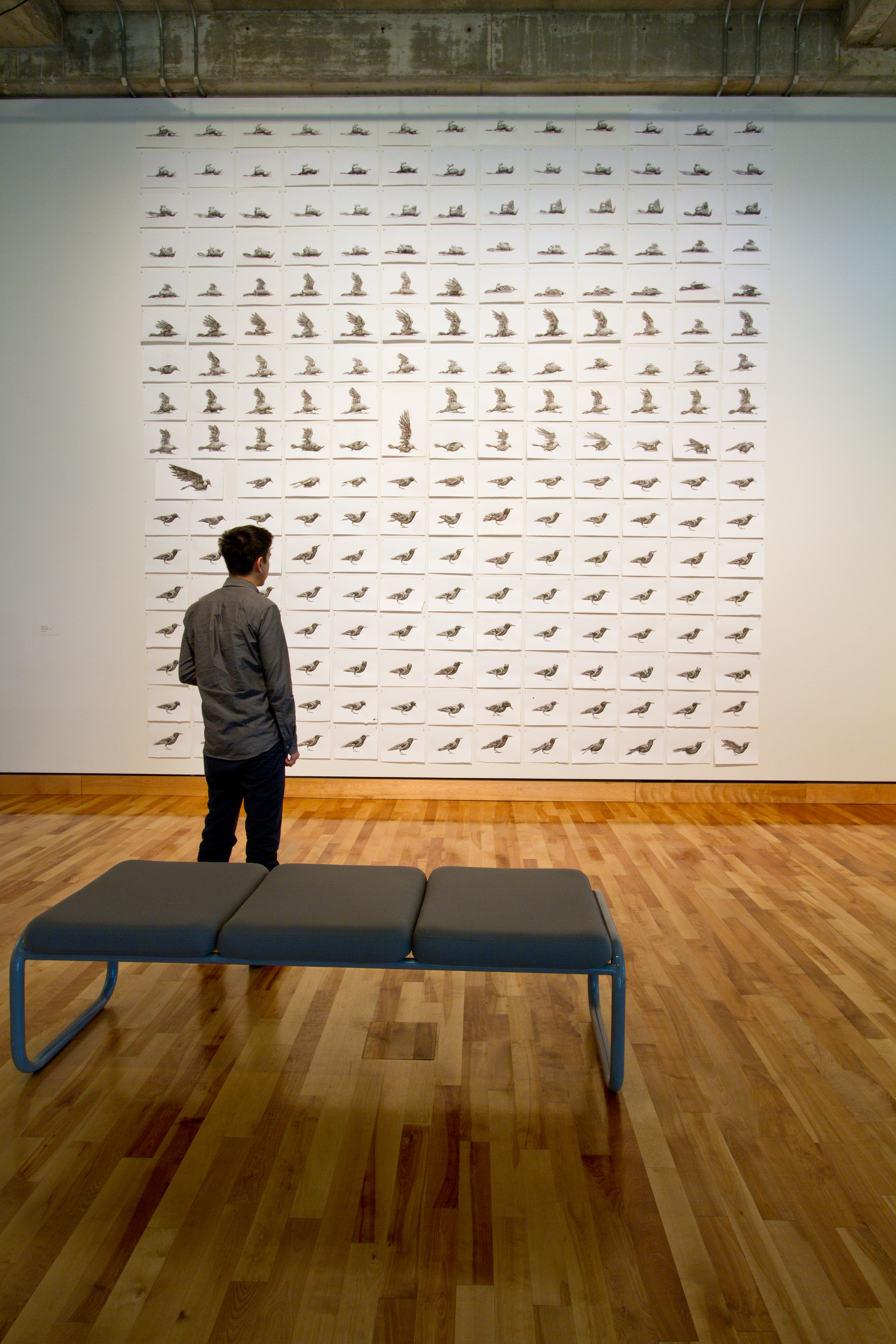
Installation of '49 seconds,' exhibited in 'The New Romantics' at The Rooms (2012)

=== Selected exhibitions ===
- 2012 'New Romantics,' The Rooms Provincial Art Gallery
- 2012 'Co-exist simultaneously' Solo show, Leyton Gallery of Fine Arts
- 2013 'Boxed in' The Rooms Provincial Art Gallery & Craft Council Gallery, curated by Denis Longchamps
- 2013 'MIRIAD’, The Rooms Provincial Art Gallery curated by Bruce Johnson
- 2013 'Landscape Illuminated' The Leyton Gallery of Fine Art
- 2014–15 ‘Shine a Light: Canadian Biennial 2014’, The National Gallery of Canada
- 2015 Stories We Tell Ourselves' Craft Council Gallery
- 2015 'Elapsed’ Two Rivers Gallery, Prince George, curated by George Harris
- 2015 'Fragments for your Imagination to Hold', Christina Parker Gallery
- 2015 'Nature Present' Rotary Arts Centre, curated by Mary MacDonald
- 2015–16 'Writing Topography, The Marion McCain Exhibition of Contemporary Atlantic Art' curated by Corinna Ghaznavi at Beaverbrook Art Gallery
- 2016 ‘Land of Mirrors: ongoing experiments in Newfoundland‘, Eastern Edge Art Gallery, Curated by Mary MacDonald
- 2016 'The Expanded Place' Christina Parker Gallery

=== Residency ===
2012 Artist in Residence, Elbow Room, The Rooms Provincial Art Gallery.

=== Collections ===
- The National Gallery of Canada
- City of St John's, NL
- The Provincial Art Bank, NL
- The Rooms Permanent Collection
- Private Collections
