= Mary Pratt (painter) =

Canadian painter (1935–2018)

- Born: Mary Frances West; March 15, 1935; Fredericton, New Brunswick, Canada
- Died: August 14, 2018 (aged 83); St. John's, Newfoundland, Canada
- Education: Mount Allison University
- Known for: Painter
- Spouse: Christopher Pratt (m. 1957; div. 2005)
- Children: 5; John, Anne, Barbara, Ned and David (died in infancy)
- Parents: William J. West (father); Katherine Eleanor McMurray (mother)

Mary Frances Pratt, CC RCA D.Litt (née West) (March 15, 1935 – August 14, 2018) was a Canadian painter known for her photo-realist still life paintings. Pratt never thought of her work as being focused on one subject matter: her early work is often of domestic scenes, while later work may have a darker undertone, with people as the central subject matter. She painted what appealed to her, being emotionally connected to her subject. Pratt often spoke of conveying the sensuality of light in her paintings, and of the "erotic charge" her chosen subjects possessed.

== Career ==
=== Painting ===
Mary Pratt's work focused on her relationship with domestic life in rural Newfoundland and common household items: jars of jelly, apples, aluminum foil, brown paper bags. Using photographic projections while painting, Pratt's style was bold and flamboyant, rendering her subject vivid and realistic. Due to this transformation of the mundane into something aesthetic, "she may have had more influence on shaping the way we see things than any Canadian painter since the Group of Seven". Pratt arrived at her signature style in the late 1960s, after discovering that light was her central subject and deciding to incorporate photography into her artistic process. Her paintings The Bed (1968) and Supper Table (1969) are the earliest examples of her characteristic style.

In 1978, Pratt's painting Girl in a Wicker Chair, created that year, was published on the cover of Saturday Night magazine. This was the first of an extended series of paintings on Donna Meaney, who first served as a model for Pratt's artist husband, Christopher Pratt and with whom he reportedly had a brief affair. Some of Pratt's paintings of Donna were based on her husband's photographs. These works are markedly different from those composed and photographed by Pratt herself. Pratt's portraits of Meaney embody a noticeable tension that is absent in her husband's paintings of her. However, Pratt always regarded Meaney as a friend.

In the 1980s, Pratt continued exploring new subject matter and media. She created a series of paintings on weddings, including a portrait of her daughter Barbara, entitled Barby in the Dress She Made Herself (1986). Another series consists of paintings and mixed-media drawings of fires, which function as a metaphor for sacrifice. Using pastels and coloured pencils in this series enabled Pratt to work on a larger scale than she had previously done in oils.

In the early 1990s, Pratt and her husband separated, which lent her paintings of that period a darker, angry tone. For example, Pomegranates in Glass on Glass (1993) depicts the fruit torn apart into pieces, exposing its blood-red seeds.

In a 2013 Globe and Mail article, responding to critics of her work as too commercial, she said, "People will find out that in each one of the paintings there is something that ought to disturb them, something upsetting. That is why I painted them."

=== Exhibitions ===
Pratt's paintings have been exhibited in most major galleries in Canada, reproduced in magazines such as Saturday Night, Chatelaine, and Canadian Art. Her work is found in many prominent public, corporate, and private collections, including those of the National Gallery of Canada, The Rooms, Art Gallery of Nova Scotia, the New Brunswick Museum, Beaverbrook Art Gallery, Vancouver Art Gallery, Art Gallery of Ontario, and Canada House in England.

Pratt's first solo exhibition was held at the Memorial University Art Gallery in St. John's in 1967. The first showing of her art outside Atlantic Canada was part of an exhibition at the Picture Loan Gallery in 1971 in Toronto. In 1973, Erindale College (Toronto) gave her a show of her own.

The big breakthrough for wider notice of Pratt's work came when the National Gallery of Canada included many of her paintings and drawing in an exhibition in 1975 titled Some Canadian Women Artists curated by Mayo Graham. Her work also coincided with the upsurge of the women's movement (International Women's Year was in 1975 as well). Several colleges and universities began incorporating discussions of her works in their women's studies programs. Public galleries began to show Pratt's work, holding retrospectives, among them Museum London (1981) and the Robert McLaughlin Gallery, Oshawa (1983).

In 1995, the touring exhibition The Art of Mary Pratt: The Substance of Light was organized by the Beaverbrook Art Gallery in Fredericton, New Brunswick. The accompanying catalogue won numerous awards and was included in Great Canadian Books of the Century. Other recent shows at commercial galleries include Inside Light at the Equinox Gallery in Vancouver, Canada (May/June 2011) and New Paintings and Works on Paper at the Mira Godard Gallery in Toronto, Canada (May/June 2012). The exhibition was curated by Tom Smart.

The solo exhibition titled Mary Pratt toured throughout Canada from 2013 to January, 2015. It was organized by The Rooms Provincial Art Gallery and Art Gallery of Nova Scotia and curated by Mireille Eagan, Sarah Fillmore, and Caroline Stone. The accompanying catalogue was published by Goose Lane Editions. The tour traveled to the Art Gallery of Windsor in Windsor, Ontario; the McMichael Canadian Art Collection in Kleinburg, Ontario; the MacKenzie Art Gallery in Regina, Saskatchewan; and the Art Gallery of Nova Scotia in Halifax, Nova Scotia.

The solo exhibition Mary Pratt: This Little Painting was on display at the National Gallery of Canada, running from April 4, 2015, to January 4, 2016. It toured to the Owens Art Gallery at Mount Allison University from March 11 to May 22, 2016. The exhibition was co-organized by the National Gallery of Canada and The Rooms Provincial Art Gallery. It was curated by Jonathan Shaughnessy and Mireille Eagan.

=== Advisory/public duty ===
Pratt served on the government Task Force for Education in Newfoundland in 1973, on the Fishery Industry Advisory Board from 1978 to 1979, and on the Board of Management of the Grace General Hospital in St. John's, Newfoundland. She also served on the Federal Cultural Policy Review Committee, which produced the Applebaum-Hébert Report in 1981. Pratt chaired a committee to advise on the creation of the School of Fine Arts at Sir Wilfred Grenfell College in Corner Brook, Newfoundland in 1985. Pratt held numerous other positions, including a seat on the Canada Council from 1987 to 1993, and on the Board of Regents of Mount Allison University from 1983 to 1991.

In the 1980s, Pratt began giving addresses and published essays in periodicals such as The Globe and Mail and Glass Gazette.

== Personal life ==
Pratt was the daughter of attorney William J. West, who served as the Minister of Justice of New Brunswick from 1952 to 1958 and Katherine E. MacMurray. From as young as the age of 2, Pratt was intrigued by the relationship of light meeting a subject and started taking paint lessons by the age of 10. She had a younger sister, Barbara West Cross. She was strongly influenced by her maternal grandmother, Edna McMurray, who was the co-founder of the first IODE chapter in New Brunswick and served as its activist president for over 20 years.

Pratt attended Mount Allison University, studying Fine Arts with Alex Colville, Ted Pulford, and Lawren P. Harris, completing her degree in 1961. In her second year, she met the artist Christopher Pratt while they were both students there; they married on September 12, 1957. Immediately after, they moved to Scotland, where Christopher had been accepted to the Glasgow School of Art.

In 1963, they moved to Salmonier at the head of St. Mary's Bay, Newfoundland and Labrador. In 1964, the Memorial University Art Gallery mounted an exhibition of her work. She and Christopher had five children: John, Anne, Barbara, Ned, and David, who died in infancy. They divorced in 2005. The following year she married American artist Jim Rosen; they divorced in 2015. Mary Pratt died at home in St. John's, Newfoundland, on August 14, 2018.

== Awards and honours ==
In 1996, Pratt was named Companion of the Order of Canada. In 1997, she was awarded the $50,000 Molson Prize for visual artists from the Canada Council for the Arts. In 2013, she was made a member of the Royal Canadian Academy of Arts. Pratt was also awarded nine honorary degrees from various universities throughout Canada, including from Dalhousie University (1985), Memorial University (D.Litt.) (1986), and St. Thomas University (2000).

In 2006, Pratt was awarded the Long Haul Award presented at the EVA Awards ceremony, which recognized her as an influential artist in Newfoundland visual culture.

In 2007, Canada Post issued stamps in its "Art Canada" series in honour of Mary Pratt. The $0.52 (domestic rate) stamp featured her Jelly Shelf (1999). The souvenir sheet included the $0.52 stamp, as well as a $1.55 (international rate) stamp with her Iceberg in the North Atlantic (1991).

== Quotes ==
"It can't just be a painting of something, it has to be a painting that is something. A painting has to acquire a life of its own."

"I am not inspired by a person, but rather my relationship with the visual world."

"When I get in front of the easel and begin to paint, I sometimes burst into tears because I am so happy to be here. I am so glad it is just me, the canvas, the paint, and this dear little brush."

"I have found life very emotional and difficult to stay even. And I think that perhaps that comes out in the paintings - certainly I would never paint anything that didn't strike me emotionally, something that didn't physically bother me."

"People will find out that in each one of the paintings there is something that ought to disturb them, something upsetting. That is why I painted them."
