= Mary Florence MacDonald =

- Born: September 10, 1984; Truro, Nova Scotia
- Died: July 18, 2017 (aged 32); St. John's, Newfoundland and Labrador
- Education: Master of Fine Arts (Criticism & Curatorial Practice), OCAD University (2012)
- Occupation: Curator
- Years active: 2008–2016
- Known for: Land of Mirrors

Mary Florence MacDonald (September 10, 1984 – July 18, 2017) was a Canadian artist and independent curator based in St. John’s (Newfoundland and Labrador), who left a lasting impact on the arts and cultural community of Atlantic Canada, and advocated for the promotion of emerging artists and cultural workers in the region.

== Career ==
MacDonald was born in Truro, Nova Scotia and was of Scottish descent. She began her arts career as a university student in the Fine Arts program at Mount Allison University in Sackville, New Brunswick. During this time, MacDonald became involved with Struts Gallery and Faucet Media Arts Centre, a local artist-run-centre dedicated to the promotion of emerging visual arts practices and critically engaged contemporary art.

After graduating in 2006, MacDonald participated in the critically acclaimed internship program at the Owens Art Gallery in Sackville, under the tutelage of Director Gemey Kelly. Following this appointment, MacDonald moved to St. John’s in 2008 and began working with Eastern Edge Gallery as Assistant Director until 2010. She then pursued a Masters in Curatorial Studies at OCAD University in Toronto, graduating in 2012. MacDonald returned to St. John’s to assume the role of executive director at Eastern Edge Gallery, where she worked until 2015.

During her time as executive director, MacDonald also contributed to the community of St. John’s through independent projects, and volunteer work (for example, MacDonald was the founder of the St. John’s based Girls Rock NL, which seeks to empower self-identified girls and female youth with access to the arts and music programming). In 2017, MacDonald was a curator for Flotilla, "the first transnational gathering focusing on nomadic and temporary elements of contemporary artist-run culture in Atlantic Canada", held in Charlottetown, PEI in September 2017.

== Work ==
MacDonald received critical acclaim for her curatorial work which considered regionalism, site, and rural art practices. MacDonald's project, W(here) Festival, held in Pictou County, Nova Scotia, completed during her graduate studies at OCADU, considered the importance and creative potential for curating within rural communities. As explained by MacDonald, the W(here) Festival occurred over five days and "included three visiting artist projects by Marlene Creates, Sheilah Wilson and Site Media Inc, four works by local artists drawn from a call for submissions by Susan Sellers, Raina McDonald, Sharon Nowlan, Linda Little and Sheree Fitch, seven presentations by additional local artists and one musical performance by Al Tuck".

In an essay to accompany the festival, MacDonald said:

"On a curatorial level, I argue that art practices and engagements in rural places teach us how to re-examine the familiar, re-imagine place and make change on a more human-scale. Projects tend to take a long time to develop here and their legacy felt long after. Unlike cities where 20 cultural products come and go almost on a daily basis, here change can be profound, slow and incredibly meaningful. In addition, projects out "here" can often be over looked, ephemeral. But indeed, the old divide between city and country is a tired one. Instead, the projects, stories and actions of the W(here) Festival suggest new simultaneous territories and methodologies that are rich and complex."

In 2016, her project Land of Mirrors was presented at Eastern Edge Gallery, and featured the work of Michael Flaherty, Will Gill, Philippa Jones, Jerry Ropson, and Jason Wells. As explained by author Lisa Moore in Canadian Art:

"There is a subtle ambiguity in the subtitle of this exhibition. It might mean that ongoing experiments are happening in Newfoundland, have always happened there, or it might mean that experiments are happening to the very thingness that is Newfoundland—or was Newfoundland...Either way, a wilful dreaming is evoked. Newfoundland is a malleable idea, constantly being dreamt and reconfigured. The question also hints at the fanciful, mildly surreal aesthetic throughout the exhibit. MacDonald and the five artists, Will Gill, Jason Wells, Jerry Ropson, Michael Flaherty and Philippa Jones, are intent on exploring a new Newfoundland."

MacDonald also contributed to a number of arts magazines including Visual Art News, Cuss (editor), C Magazine, and The Overcast.

== Activism ==
MacDonald campaigned against cuts to arts funding and spoke out about the value of artists' work and societal contributions throughout her professional career, such as publishing a list of artists who had left Newfoundland and Labrador in The Overcast newspaper, saying "this province lacks vision and the ability to retain young professionals." She spoke out against the Newfoundland and Labrador 2013 budget cuts that led to staffing losses at the St. John's-based museum and gallery The Rooms. That campaign included a public forum she co-organized to discuss the cuts titled ART=WORK, a slogan she pioneered. Tshirts with the ART=WORK slogan have since been sold as fundraiser by the non-profit group Visual Artists of Newfoundland and Labrador, in partnership with the Mary MacDonald Foundation, with proceeds meant to support artists in the province.

== Legacy ==
When writing about the W(here) Festival in her OCADU thesis paper, MacDonald included a dedication in which she stated:

"To the communities of Pictou County this project is for you. May it encourage other artists and cultural organizers to be brave in places like yours and for others to listen".

Such a statement communicates the heart of Mary MacDonald’s legacy in Atlantic Canada and nationally.

Her death of cancer in July 2017 prompted the arts community of St. John’s and Atlantic Canada to reflect on her work, and her efforts to bring contemporary art to rural communities. As stated in a posthumous article in The Overcast (an alternative newspaper based out of St. John's ), Chad Pelley states that "She was the kind of bright realistic visionary that imparted critical thinking and influence into her community." In the same article, Pelley states "It isn’t even her astounding community impact a lot of us are taking note of and celebrating upon her death. Instead, it’s that light she had in her, that just went out on us all. Whatever that was, it’s something so rare we miss it already."

To commemorate her legacy, the Mary MacDonald Foundation has been established to support independent curatorial practices.
