= Ted Pulford =

Canadian artist (1914–1994)

Edward Pulford
- Born: Edward Berwyn Pulford; 14 December 1914; Saskatoon, Saskatchewan, Canada
- Died: 4 November 1994 (aged 79)
- Education: Mount Allison University
- Known for: Painter, including watercolourist

Edward Berwyn Pulford (14 December 1914 – 4 November 1994) was a Canadian painter, including watercolourist.

Ted Pulford was born in Saskatoon, Saskatchewan, on 14 December 1914 of Welsh emigrant parents and died 11 April 1994. Although he was interested in painting at an early age he did not undertake formal training until 20 years of age when he studied with Ernest Lindner at the Saskatoon Technical Collegiate. It was from Lindner that Pulford developed his love of watercolour.

Pulford joined the Royal Canadian Air Force in 1940, serving in North Africa, India and Ceylon before returning to Canada in 1945.

He enrolled at Mount Allison University where he studied fine arts under Thomas R. MacDonald and Christian McKiel, followed by Lawren P. Harris and Alex Colville. He graduated with a Bachelor of Fine Arts degree in 1949 and was immediately offered a position on the teaching staff of the university's Department of Fine Arts.

Although Pulford received honours for his works in both oils and watercolours in the 1950s, from 1960 until his retirement he turned exclusively to watercolours.

Pulford was one of a trio of teachers with Lawren P. Harris and Alex Colville that defined the Mount Allison Fine Arts department during the post-war era, and its outsized impact on Canadian art and the development of Maritime realism. As the longest-serving member of the trio, his influence on the graduates of the program was the most extensive. Christopher Pratt referred to him as the "guru of technique". He influenced generations of artists, including Hugh Mackenzie, D. P. Brown, Mary Pratt, Christopher Pratt, Roger Savage, Nancy Stevens, Tom Forrestall, and Stephen Scott. He maintained a classical approach to studio course teaching, contributing to the department's reputation for teaching realism.

For the next 30 years under a heavy teaching load, he sought to develop as an artist. During his years at Mount Allison he was also actively involved with the RCAF Squadron (1953–1963), where he organized and conducted winter training programs and served as commanding officer (1961–1963).

He retired from teaching in the Spring of 1980. In May 1983, Mount Allison University conferred on him an Honorary Doctor of Fine Arts degree, the first such to be conferred by Mount Allison.
