= Robert Hurley =

Robert Hurley may refer to:

- Robert A. Hurley (1895–1968), American politician and governor of Connecticut
- Robert Newton Hurley, English-born painter in Canada
- Robert Hurley (translator), French-English translator
- Robert Hurley (swimmer) (born 1988), Australian swimmer
- Bob Hurley (born 1947), American high school basketball coach
- Bobby Hurley (born 1971), American college basketball coach and former pro player
