= Tom Forrestall =

Canadian realist painter (1936–2024)

Tom Forrestall CM ONS
- Born: Thomas DeVany Forrestall; 11 March 1936; Middleton, Nova Scotia, Canada
- Died: 15 November 2024 (aged 88); Dartmouth, Nova Scotia, Canada
- Education: Mount Allison University
- Known for: Painter
- Style: Realist
- Awards: Order of Canada (1986)
- Elected: Royal Canadian Academy of Arts (1973)

Thomas DeVany Forrestall CM ONS (11 March 1936 – 15 November 2024) was a Canadian realist painter. Forrestall was born in Middleton, Nova Scotia and studied with Alex Colville at Mount Allison University. He became a fulltime professional artist in 1960. His works, chiefly painted in watercolour or egg tempera, are held by major galleries throughout Canada.

== Early life and education ==
Forrestall was born in Annapolis Valley, now known as Middleton, Nova Scotia on 11 March 1936. He was one of four children in a Roman Catholic family. As a child he developed epilepsy and began having seizures at the age of seven. From 1942 until 1951 the family lived in Dartmouth, Nova Scotia, where Forrestall's father, a carpenter, was employed in the construction of a new hospital. During this period he participated in art classes given by Nova Scotia College of Art students. Forrestall attended high school in Middleton, where he continued drawing and painting.

Forrestall entered Mount Allison University in 1954, having been awarded a scholarship to study art. His studio teachers were Lawren P. Harris, the Fine Arts department head, Ted Pulford, who taught watercolour painting, and Alex Colville. Colville introduced him to egg tempera, the medium in which he specialized from the 1960s onwards. Colville described Forrestall as "the most promising artist our school has produced in a decade." After graduating in 1958 Forrestall was awarded a Canada Council grant which allowed him to travel in Europe.

== Career ==
In 1959 Forrestall moved to Fredericton, New Brunswick and was hired as assistant curator of the newly opened Beaverbrook Art Gallery. He was responsible for cataloguing the museum's holdings and maintaining the resulting accession records. His employment was terminated after he had two epileptic seizures while at work in early 1960. In 2006 Forrestall appeared as a witness in an ownership dispute between the Beaverbrook UK Foundation and the gallery. The Foundation claimed that a number of valuable paintings had not been given to the gallery by Lord Beaverbrook, but were only on loan. Forrestall testified that he understood from his work as assistant curator and his contact with Beaverbrook that the paintings were "all one big, great gift". His testimony was an important moment in the case, which was decided in the gallery's favour.

Forrestall was a fulltime artist from 1960 onwards. In that year the New Brunswick government commissioned a painting by him as a wedding present for Princess Margaret. He was one of six artists commissioned to provide murals representing aspects of New Brunswick culture for the Centennial Building, the new provincial office building in Fredericton which opened in 1967. Forrestall's work was a sheet metal construction depicting farming.

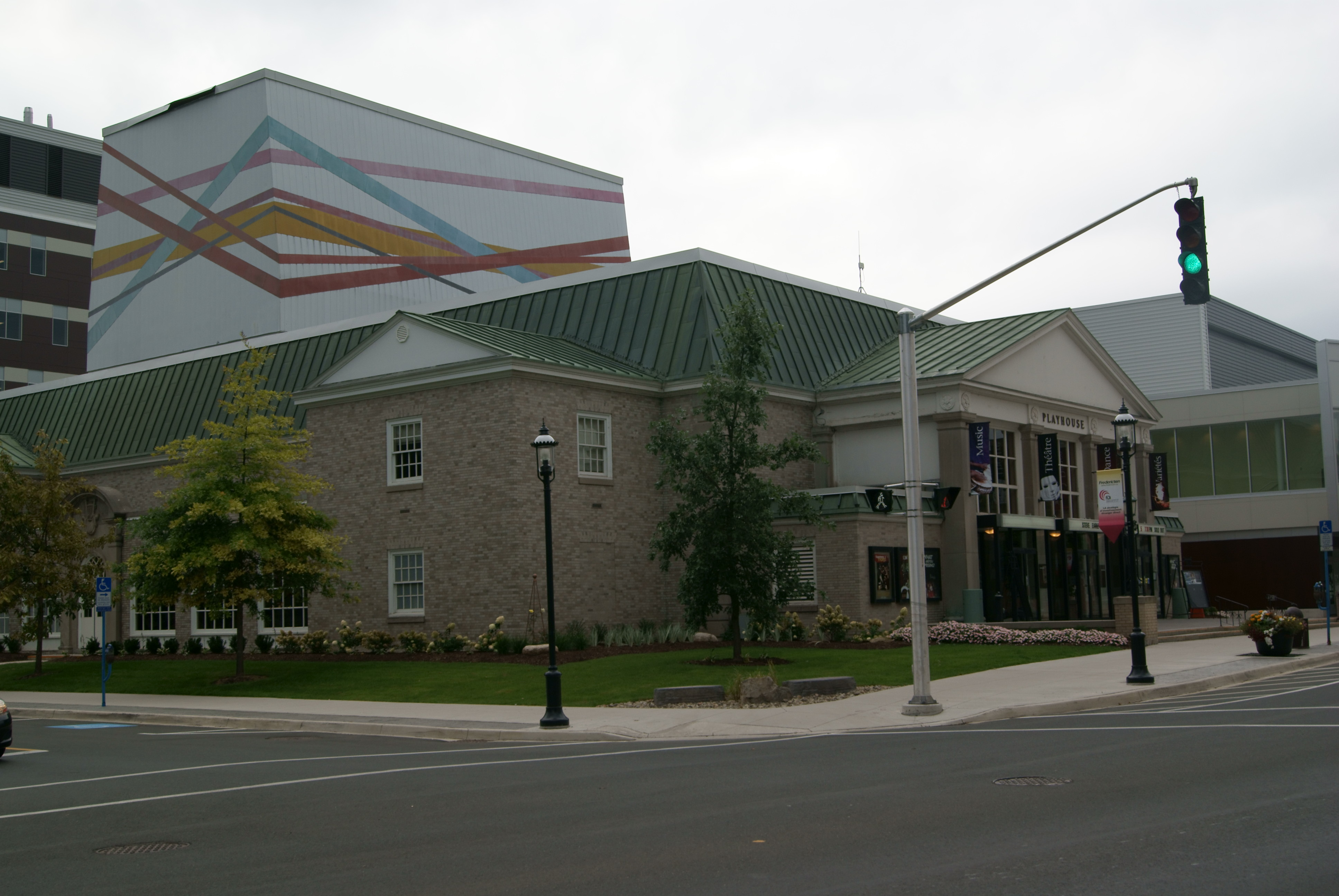
The Fredericton Playhouse with Forrestall's fly tower mural

Forrestall created the mural for the fly tower which was added to the Fredericton Playhouse in 1972. The mural, which resembles "an enormous colourful box resting atop a Georgian-style theatre", made the Playhouse "one of the most recognizable [buildings] in Atlantic Canada".

Forrestall was elected to the Royal Canadian Academy of Arts in 1973. In 1974 he collaborated with the poet Alden Nowlan on a book entitled Shaped by This Land, in which 54 poems were juxtaposed with 76 paintings and sketches.

In 1986 Forrestall's portrait of Pierre Trudeau's three sons, which had been commissioned by the Canadian government, was presented to the former prime minister as a gift from the nation.

A major retrospective of Forrestall's work at the Art Gallery of Nova Scotia in 2008 included work from the 1950s to 2007. The exhibition subsequently travelled to the Beaverbrook Art Gallery in Fredericton, the Confederation Centre Art Gallery in Charlottetown, Prince Edward Island, the McMichael Canadian Art Collection in Kleinburg, Ontario, and the Owens Art Gallery at Mount Allison University, Forrestall's alma mater.

In 2015 the Beaverbrook Art Gallery and Mercedes-Benz Canada collaborated on the exhibition A Car for All Seasons. Forrestall spent six months in a Dartmouth automobile showroom painting the 1980 Mercedes-Benz 300 SD four-door sedan that he had owned and driven from 1980 until 2012 with images of the changing seasons.

Forrestall's works are held in many Canadian and international galleries and collections, including the National Gallery of Canada, the Art Gallery of Nova Scotia, the Musée d'art contemporain de Montréal, and the Art Gallery of Ontario. The Beaverbrook Art Gallery received a "generous and momentous gift of 270 sketchbooks" from the artist. A further collection of 100 sketchbooks was exhibited at St. Thomas University in Fredericton in 2022 and 2023.

== Style and artistic media ==
Forrestall's work is in the realist tradition. His main media were egg tempera and watercolour painting. He often made his tempera paintings in shapes that differ from the traditional rectangles and squares. A 2016 exhibition of landscapes and interiors was described as expressing "distinct moments of stillness and movement in quiet, discreet places; in nature, in home and in human consciousness"

Forrestall's over 400 sketchbooks, which he began when still in his teens, contain "drawings, small wash paintings, and writings on his art and life". Tom Smart, who curated a major Forrestall retrospective exhibition, remarked in 2022 that the existence of this "continuous" set of notebooks, spanning a period of 70 years, is "amazing".

== Death ==
Forrestall died in Dartmouth, Nova Scotia on 15 November 2024, at the age of 88.

== Honours ==
- Royal Canadian Academy of Arts (elected 1973)
- Queen Elizabeth II Silver Jubilee Medal (1977)
- Member of the Order of Canada (1986)
- 125th Anniversary of the Confederation of Canada Medal (1992)
- Order of Nova Scotia (2007)
