= Immaculate Memories: The Uncluttered Worlds of Christopher Pratt =

- Film poster
- Directed by: Kenneth J. Harvey
- Edited by: Christopher Darlington
- Music by: Andrew Staniland
- Production company: Island Horse Productions
- Release date: June 2018 (Nickel Film Festival)
- Running time: 72 minutes
- Country: Canada
- Language: English

Immaculate Memories: The Uncluttered Worlds of Christopher Pratt is a Canadian documentary film, directed by Kenneth J. Harvey and released in 2018. The film profiles artist Christopher Pratt, while also interviewing his daughter Barbara Pratt, as well as Christopher's studio assistant and former wife Jeanette Meehan.

The film premiered at the Nickel Film Festival in June 2018, won the "Cineplex Odéon Quartier Latin Award for Best Canadian Work" at the International Festival of Films on Art in 2019, and aired as an episode of the CBC Television documentary series Absolutely Canadian.

The film received a Canadian Screen Award nomination for Best Feature Length Documentary at the 7th Canadian Screen Awards in 2019.
