= Pulford (surname) =

Pulford is a surname. Notable people with the surname include:

- Andrew Pulford (born 1958), Royal Air Force officer
- Bob Pulford (1936–2026), Canadian ice hockey player and coach
- Conway Pulford (1892–1942), Royal Air Force officer
- Elizabeth Pulford (born 1943), Canadian writer
- Eric Pulford (1915–2005), British commercial artist
- George Pulford (1873 – after 1913), English professional golfer
- Harvey Pulford (1875–1940), Canadian athlete
- Jaala Pulford (born 1974), Australian politician
- Kate Pulford (born 1980), New Zealand cricketer
- Ted Pulford (1914–1994), Canadian painter
