= Bushra Junaid =

Canadian artist, curator and arts administrator

Bushra Junaid is a Canadian artist, curator and arts administrator based in Toronto. She is best known for exploring history, memory and cultural identity through mixed media collage, drawing and painting. Born in Montreal to Jamaican and Nigerian parents and raised in St. John's, Newfoundland and Labrador, Junaid's work frequently engages themes of Blackness, the African diaspora and the history of Atlantic Canada.

In addition to exhibiting her work across Canada, in provincial galleries and artist-run centres, Junaid illustrated Nana's Cold Days (Groundwood Books) and has exhibited at Painted City Gallery, Galerie Céline Allard, Spence Gallery, Harbourfront Centre, Toronto Reference Library, the NFB, and Sandra Brewster's Open House.

Junaid curated the 2020 exhibition at The Rooms entitled "What Carries Us: Newfoundland and Labrador in the Black Atlantic".

== Noted works ==
=== Two Pretty Girls (2016) ===
With the intention of making visible the connection between Newfoundland and the Caribbean diaspora, Junaid initiated and co-curated (along with Pamela Edmonds) the New-Found-Lands project at St. John's Eastern Edge Gallery in 2016. The New-Found-Lands exhibition featured Junaid's work Two Pretty Girls – a re-enactment by the artist and her sister of a 19th century image of two unnamed plantation workers. According to Junaid, in conversation with curator Mireille Eagan, "I see [the women in the image Two Pretty Girls] as my ancestors. By enlarging the image I give it the immediacy of a family portrait; catapulting these women out of distant history into the present." Two Pretty Girls was also included in the exhibition Future Possible: The Art of Newfoundland and Labrador to 1949 at The Rooms Provincial Art Gallery in 2018 and the exhibition Like Sugar at the Tang Teaching Museum at Skidmore College in 2019.

=== Sweet Childhood (2017) ===
In 2018, Junaid's Sweet Childhood was included in the Royal Ontario Museum's Here We Are Here: Black Canadian Contemporary Art exhibition, which featured the work of nine Canadian artists in dialogue on themes of race, belonging and Blackness in Canada. Reclaiming a 1903 stereoview of children in a Caribbean sugarcane field as a form of family portraiture, Sweet Childhood includes archival photography and text printed on a backlit fabric panel. The exhibit subsequently traveled to the Montreal Museum of Fine Art and will open at the Art Gallery of Nova Scotia in the summer of 2019.

=== Nana's Cold Days ===
Bushra has illustrated a book for small children by Adwoa Badoe with colourful collages, some enriched with clippings from photographs of the sky, fruit or faces.
