= Kenneth J. Harvey =

Canadian novelist, filmmaker, and journalist

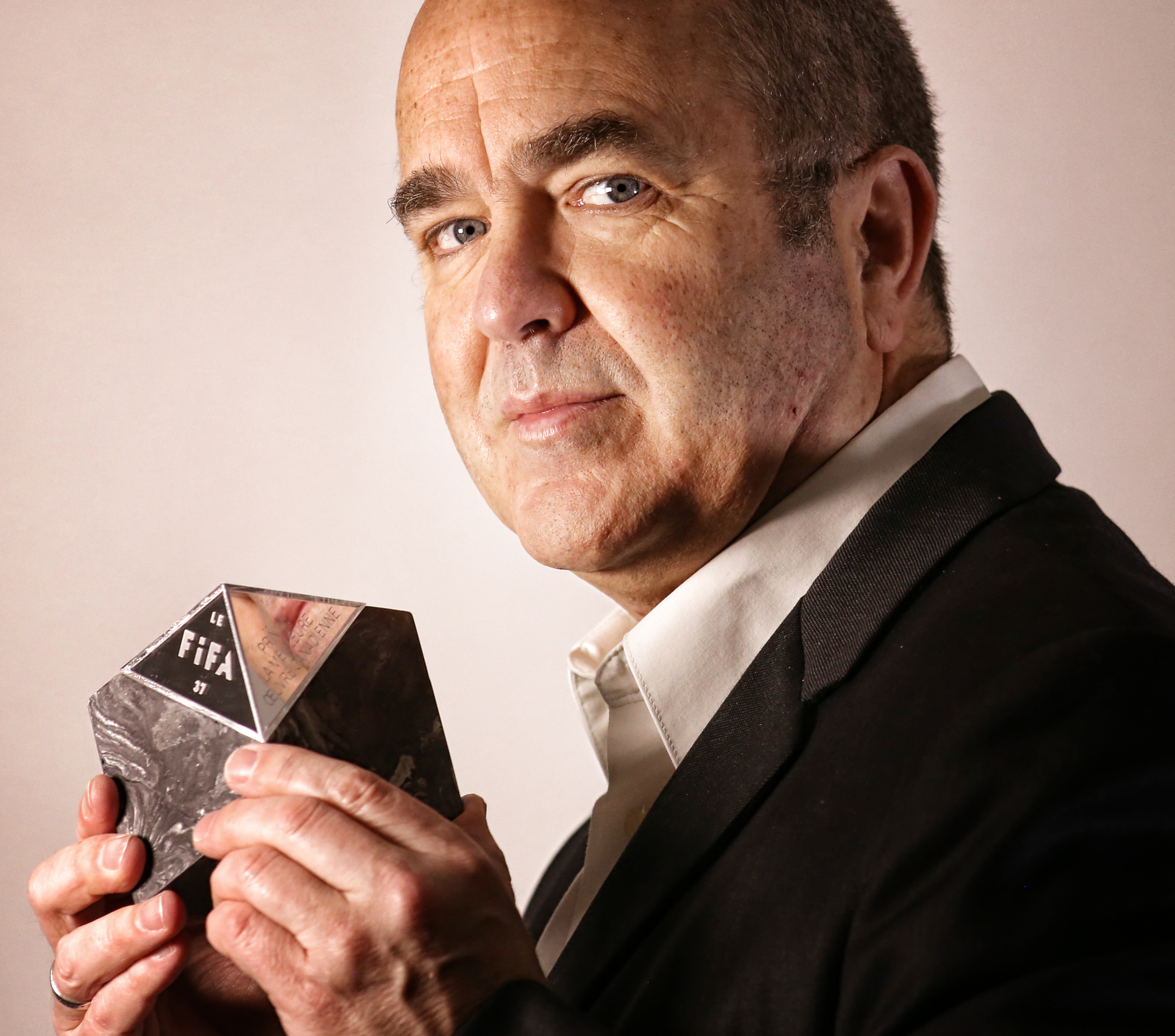
- Harvey with an award for Best Canadian Film at the 2019 International Festival of Films on Art
- Born: January 22, 1962 (age 64)
- Occupations: writer, filmmaker
- Known for: The Town That Forgot How to Breathe, Blackstrap Hawco, Inside, Immaculate Memories: The Uncluttered Worlds of Christopher Pratt
- Awards: Thomas Head Raddall Award, Rogers Writers' Trust Fiction Prize, Winterset Award

Kenneth Joseph Thomas Harvey (born January 22, 1962) is a Canadian writer and filmmaker from Newfoundland and Labrador.

Harvey's debut short story collection, Directions for an Opened Body, was published in 1990, and was nominated for the Commonwealth Writers Prize. In 1992 he published his first novel, Brud, which was a shortlisted finalist for the SmithBooks/Books in Canada First Novel Award in 1993.

His 2003 novel The Town That Forgot How to Breathe was his first book to be republished in the United States. It won the Thomas Head Raddall Award in 2004. The novel also won Italy's Libro del Mare for best book about the sea.

In 2006, his novel Inside won the Rogers Writers' Trust Fiction Prize and the Winterset Award. It was also nominated for the 2006 Giller Prize.

His 2008 novel Blackstrap Hawco was nominated for the Giller Prize in 2008.

As a filmmaker Harvey is most noted for his 2018 documentary film Immaculate Memories: The Uncluttered Worlds of Christopher Pratt, a profile of artist Christopher Pratt. It was nomina y ted for a Canadian Screen Award for Best Feature Length Documentary at the 7th Canadian Screen Awards in 2019. It won the award for Best Canadian Film at the 2019 International Festival of Films on Art.

In 2000, with his former wife Janet, Harvey founded the ReLit Awards, an annual award for independent Canadian literature. Management of the ReLits was taken over in 2021 by his daughter, Katherine Alexandra Harvey.

== Books ==
- Directions for an Opened Body - 1990
- Brud - 1992
- Stalkers - 1994
- The Hole That Must Be Filled - 1995
- Nine-Tenths Unseen - 1996
- Kill The Poets: Anti-verse - 1998
- The Flesh So Close - 1998
- The Great Misogynist - 1998
- Everyone Hates a Beauty Queen - 1998
- The Woman in the Closet - 1998
- Skin Hound - 2000
- Little White Squaw: A White Woman's Story of Abuse, Addiction, and Reconciliation - 2002, with Eve Mills Nash
- The Town That Forgot How to Breathe - 2003
- Shack: The Cutland Junction Stories - 2004
- Inside - 2006
- Blackstrap Hawco - 2008
- Reinventing the Rose - 2011

== Films ==
- I'm 14 and I Hate the World - 2011
- box
- It's a Girl
- Remains
- Geek Assassin - 2013
- It Was Sunny The Day I Killed Her - 2015
- The Immigrant's Handbook
- The Drinking Life - 2017
- I Heard the Birch Tree Whisper in the Night: Gerald Squires on Creation and Death - 2017
- Immaculate Memories: The Uncluttered Worlds of Christopher Pratt - 2018
- It Was All So Wonderful: The Everyday Magic of Mary Pratt - 2019
- The Incredible Vanishing Sisters - 2022
- What the Darkness Cannot Extinguish: The Storytelling Madness of Clifford George - 2023
- The Governor of Georgetown - 2024
- The Bear Inside a Whale - 2025

== TV ==
- The Slattery Street Crockers (Writer/Director/Producer)
- B U C K Y (Writer/Director/Producer)
- Lore (Writer/Director/Producer)
