= Eastern Edge =

Artist-run centre in St. John's, Newfoundland and Labrador

Coordinates: 47.564496°N 52.705652°W

Eastern Edge Gallery is an artist-run centre based in St. John's, Newfoundland and Labrador, Canada. Eastern Edge Gallery was established in 1984 as the first artist-run centre in the province. In 1987, it moved out of the LSPU Hall in to Flavin St, where City Building inspectors posted "stop-occupancy orders." Eastern Edge Gallery moved to its current Harbour Dr. location on November 5, 1988.

Eastern Edge promotes contemporary art and practices, supporting both established and emerging artists through exhibition opportunities, performances, screenings, panel discussions, and special programming.

In addition, the ARC founded HOLD FAST Contemporary Arts Festival; the province's first and longest running festival dedicated to contemporary art. In 2017 Eastern Edge launched Identify: A Celebration of Indigenous Arts and Culture, "to create space for Indigenous voices and expression, bringing together Indigenous arts and culture professionals from the theatre, film, literature, visual, culinary and textile art communities of Newfoundland and Labrador while giving time and space to reinforce their history and current experience." Eastern Edge Gallery is also the home of the rOGUE Gallery, which supports projects by artists who have a connection to Newfoundland and Labrador.

An influential director of Eastern Edge was Mary Florence MacDonald, who held the role of Executive Director between 2012 and 2015. To continue the legacy of MacDonald, Eastern Edge helps to facilitate initiatives of the Mary MacDonald Foundation, which supports independent curatorial initiatives.

In 2019 Eastern Edge established EE Studios, a space dedicated to artist residencies and community events. In 2020 they established the first International Atlantic Artist Residency Program with Artlink Ltd in Donegal, Ireland.

Exhibitions in Eastern Edge's main space have presented the work of Michelle MacKinnon, Meagan Musseau, Logan MacDonald, Emily Jan, Marcia Huyer, Bushra Junaid, Jane Walker, Vivian Ross-Smith, Heather Goodchild, Naomi Yasui, Jordan Bennett, April White, Emily Hayes, Ashley Hemmings, D'Arcy Wilson, Emily Clark, Bethany Mckenzie, Catherine Moret, Faune Ybarra and Ursula Johnson.
