= Saskatoon Technical Collegiate =

Vocational secondary school in Canada

Saskatoon Technical Collegiate Institute
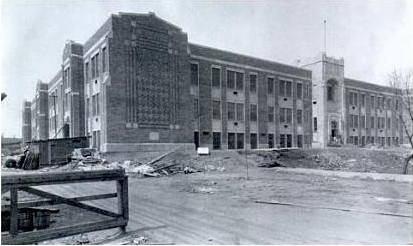
- The Collegiate around 1930

Location
- 19th Street and 3rd Avenue, Saskatoon; Canada; 52.1230°N 106.6654°W

Information
- Type: Vocational secondary
- Established: 1931

Saskatoon Technical Collegiate Institute was a vocational secondary school in Saskatoon, Saskatchewan, Canada.

== Foundation ==
The Collegiate was on the river bank in the south downtown area of Saskatoon. Saskatoon's Chinatown was destroyed in the late 1920s to make room for the Saskatoon Technical Collegiate and a legion hall. The Collegiate was completed in 1931. On 7 November 1932, a group of unemployed men who had gathered on the school grounds was forcibly removed by a joint force of police and RCMP.

== History ==
The Collegiate had the largest gymnasium in the city. Its women's basketball team won the provincial championship in the 1932–33 season. The artist Ernest Lindner started to teach at the Saskatoon Technical Collegiate in 1931, first giving a night course and then becoming a full-time instructor. He headed the Art Department at the Collegiate from 1936 until 1962. Ted Pulford (1914-1994) studied under Lindner, who brought him to love watercolor. He went on to become a noted artist and teacher at Mount Allison University in New Brunswick. Ivan Kenneth Eyre and Robert Newton Hurley were two other Lindner students who became well known artists.

Ernest C. F. Chan, born near Canton, China in 1909, came to Canada in 1928. In 1939, he became a teacher at the Collegiate, the first person from China to teach in a public school in Canada. Chan became president of the Saskatoon Rotary Club, the Saskatoon Highland Dancing Association, and the Saskatoon Folk Arts Council. Joan Anderson, later known as Joni Mitchell, took art classes at the Collegiate in the late 1950s. She studied under Henry Bonli (1927–2011), an Abstract Expressionist painter.

The Collegiate was named the Riverview Collegiate before 1981.

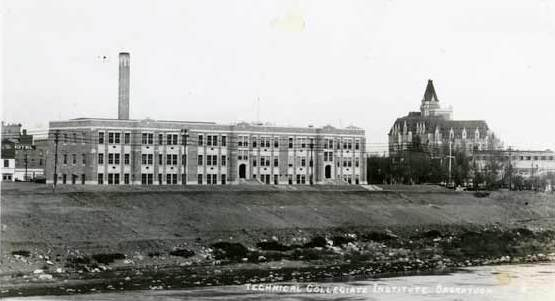
Technical Collegiate on completion in 1930. Landscaping not complete. Bessborough Hotel visible to the right.

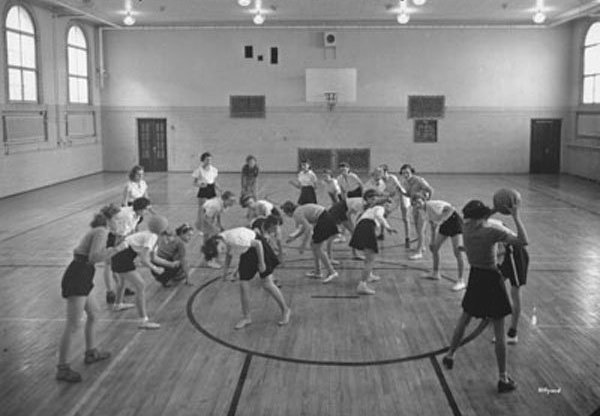
Girls' basketball game at Saskatoon Technical Collegiate circa 1932

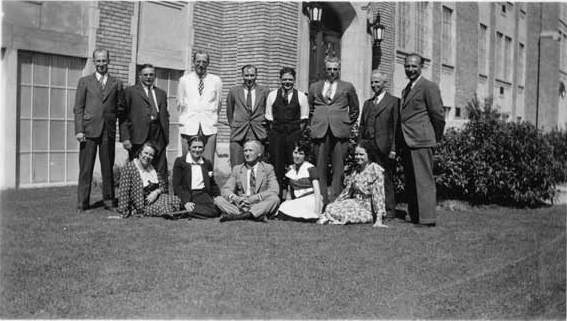
Staff members outside Saskatoon Technical Collegiate June 1936

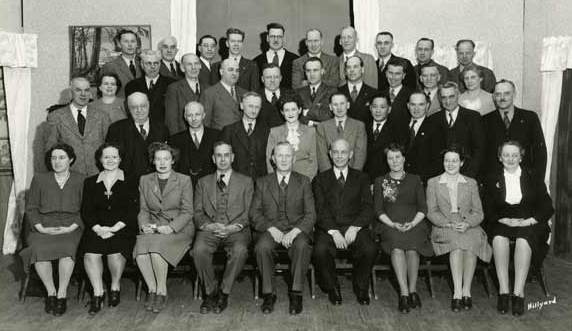
Technical Collegiate Staff 1938-39

== Destruction ==
After it closed the collegiate's premises were called the Gathercole building, and continued to house the school board offices for a period. The school board moved out, and after some controversy the building was pulled down in the summer of 2004, and the site was used for the River Landing combination of private and public development. A coalition of cultural and heritage organizations had fought to convert the building into a market/arts space. The Heritage Canada Foundation listed the Gathercole building as one of the worst losses of 2004.
