= Mireille Eagan =

Canadian arts writer and curator

- Born: 1982 (age 43–44); Calgary, Alberta
- Education: B.A. in Art History, Mount Allison University; M.A. in Art History, Concordia University, Montreal.

Mireille Eagan (born 1982) is a Canadian arts writer and curator.

== Career ==
Mireille Eagan was born in Calgary, Alberta, in 1982 and grew up in Whitehorse, Yukon, and in Fredericton, New Brunswick. She is a graduate of Mount Allison University (Bachelor of Arts in Art History) and Concordia University (Master of Arts in Art History). She was Curator at the Confederation Centre Art Gallery in Prince Edward Island from 2008 to 2010. She is currently Curator of Contemporary Art at The Rooms in St. John's, Newfoundland and Labrador. She was Curator of Canadian Art from 2011 to 2013.

Eagan has written for several catalogues, magazines, and newspapers such as Canadian Art [here] magazine, and others. In 2017, Eagan was awarded the Gold Medal for Excellence in Digital Publishing for her article on Christopher Pratt. In 2017, she also received the Critical Eye Award from EVA CARFAC.

In 2013, she was the Atlantic juror for the Sobey Art Award and the RBC Painting Competition in 2017. In 2019, Eagan successfully co-nominated Marlene Creates as the first artist from the province of Newfoundland and Labrador to receive the Governor General's Award in Visual and Media Arts.

In 2026, she wrote "Christopher Pratt: Life and Work" for the Art Canada Institute. This online book also will be published as a hardback book in 2026.

== Curatorial work ==
Mireille Eagan has curated exhibitions with institutions across Canada, as well as internationally.

In 2010, she curated inbetween at the Confederation Centre Art Gallery which travelled to the Doris McCarthy Gallery, Scarborough. In 2013, she co-curated an official collateral project with the 55th Venice Biennale alongside curator Bruce Johnson. Titled About Turn: Newfoundland in Venice, the exhibition was organized by the Terra Nova Art Foundation, and featured the work of Peter Wilkins and Will Gill. It was on display at Galleria Ca'Rezzonico until November 24, 2013.

Of particular note was the solo exhibition titled Mary Pratt, which toured throughout Canada from 2013 to 2015. It was a collaboration between The Rooms Provincial Art Gallery and the Art Gallery of Nova Scotia, and was co-curated with Sarah Fillmore and Caroline Stone. Venues included the Art Gallery of Windsor in Windsor, Ontario; the McMichael Canadian Art Collection in Kleinburg, Ontario; the MacKenzie Art Gallery in Regina, Saskatchewan; and the Art Gallery of Nova Scotia in Halifax, Nova Scotia.

The solo exhibition Mary Pratt: This Little Painting was shown at the National Gallery of Canada from April 4, 2015, to January 4, 2016. A version of it toured to the Owens Art Gallery at Mount Allison University, on display from March 11 to May 22, 2016. The exhibition was co-organized by the National Gallery of Canada and The Rooms Provincial Art Gallery] and was curated with Jonathan Shaughnessy.

An additional solo exhibition of note was Christopher Pratt: The Places I Go, at The Rooms in 2015. The exhibition was a ten-year retrospective of work by the Newfoundland painter, focusing on his travels through his home province.

In 2018 and 2019, Eagan curated Future Possible, a two-part exhibition series that explored the comprehensive art history of the province of Newfoundland and Labrador. Eagan is lead editor and author on the multi-author art historical publication Future Possible: An History of Newfoundland and Labrador, published by The Rooms and Goose Lane Editions in 2021.

Other notable group exhibitions include Migrant Art and Its Legacy in Newfoundland at The Rooms in 2015, The Free World at The Rooms in 2016, and Folklore and other Panics. In 2016, Eagan co-curated an exhibition at The Rooms with Josée Drouin-Brisebois titled "enter the fog," which included Maya Beaudry, Julia Feyrer, Tamara Henderson, and Tiziana La Melia.

== Performance ==
At the age of 11, Mireille Eagan went to Ottawa to recorded the theme song for Katie and Orbie, an animated television series aimed at preschoolers, originally broadcast in Canada in 1994 by the Family Channel. The show later aired in the United States on PBS from 1996 to 1997 and on Disney Channel from 1997 to 2000. In Canada, the series aired on Family and Playhouse Disney until 2012. The theme song as well as the music was written and composed by her uncle Edmund Eagan who had also worked as a composer on several television series and films such as Cyberchase, Hoze Houndz, The Railway Dragon, The Rick Mercer Report, Monster Force and various For Better or For Worse specials as well as a synthesizer on early episodes of The Raccoons.

== Honours and awards ==
- 2017: Gold Medal for Excellence in Digital Publishing for her article on Christopher Pratt.
- 2017: Critical Eye Award from VANL-CARFAC.
- 2022: APMA Best Atlantic-Published Book Award for Future Possible: An Art History of Newfoundland and Labrador, which was written by Eagan and published by Goose Lane Editions in February 2021.
- 2022: Melva J. Dwyer Award (Honourable Mention) for Future Possible: An Art History of Newfoundland and Labrador
- 2022: Canadian Museums Association Award for Outstanding Research (Honourable Mention) for Future Possible: An Art History of Newfoundland and Labrador
- 2022: Critical Eye Award from VANL-CARFAC
