= Ned Pratt =

Canadian photographer

- Born: 1964 (age 61–62); Salmonier, Newfoundland, Canada
- Education: Acadia University Nova Scotia College of Art and Design
- Known for: Photographer
- Parents: Christopher Pratt (father); Mary Pratt (mother)
- Relatives: Barbara Pratt (sister); William J. West (grandfather)

Ned Pratt (born 1964) is a Canadian photographer based in St. John's, Newfoundland.

Pratt grew up in the community of St. Catherine's in St. Mary's Bay, Newfoundland. In 1986 he graduated with a BA in Art History from Acadia University then moved on to the University of British Columbia to study architecture. He returned to eastern Canada and earned a BFA in Photography at the Nova Scotia College of Art and Design.

Upon graduation, Pratt worked as a freelance photo editor for the Sunday Express, a newspaper published in Newfoundland from 1989 to 1991. In subsequent years his work appeared in The New York Times, Newsweek, Maclean's, The Globe and Mail, Canadian Geographic and the Financial Post.

Pratt's photographs are in various private, public and corporate collections including the Ford Motor Company of Canada's Photographic Collection at the Canadian Museum of Contemporary Photography, the Department of External Affairs in Ottawa, the Art Gallery of Nova Scotia, and The Rooms.

Pratt is the son of painters Christopher Pratt and Mary West.
