= William J. West (Canadian politician) =

Canadian politician

Member of the Legislative Assembly of New Brunswick
- In office 1952–1960
- Constituency: York

Personal details
- Born: William John West; December 20, 1892 Coles Island, New Brunswick
- Died: February 24, 1985 (aged 92) Fredericton, New Brunswick
- Party: Progressive Conservative Party of New Brunswick
- Spouse: Katherine E. MacMurray
- Children: 2; including Mary
- Relatives: Barbara Pratt (granddaughter); Ned Pratt (grandson)
- Occupation: Lawyer

William John West (December 20, 1892 – February 24, 1985) was a Canadian politician. He served in the Legislative Assembly of New Brunswick as member of the Progressive Conservative party from 1952 to 1960. Active as a Lawyer, politician, and judge, he was the son of Amelia Prince Small and Wesley West, was born at Cole's Island, Queens County, New Brunswick on 20 December 1892. Educated at local schools in Coles Island, he attended Gagetown Grammar School and later Mount Allison (B.A.) and Harvard (LL.B.) universities. In addition to farm work, he spent five years as a clerk in a country store, time as a lumberjack and rafter, and a year running a large sawmill. Although politics interested him from a young age, he followed his father's and grandfather's affiliation to the Progressive Conservative Party, it was only through an uncle that the law suggested itself as an option. Called to the New Brunswick bar in 1923, he practised law, first at Woodstock (1923-1928) and then in Fredericton under the firm name Hanson, Dougherty & West. In 1933 he married Katherine E. MacMurray, and the couple raised two daughters, Mary (Pratt) and Barbara (Cross).

William West's education at Mount Allison was interrupted in 1915, when he enlisted as a gunner in the 1st C.G.A. He served overseas in England and France with the artillery, a signal corps, and Canadian engineers during the First World War, including duty at Vimy and Paschendale. He was demobilized from the army in April 1919 with the rank of lieutenant.

West was active in the business and political arenas. He served as director of the A. R. Loggie Company and the Maritime Trust Company. Two terms on Fredericton City Council were followed in 1952 by election on the Progressive Conservative ticket as an MLA for York County. He served as Attorney General in Hugh John Flemming's cabinet until 1958, when he was appointed to the Appeals Division of the New Brunswick Supreme Court. He stepped down from the court in 1967 and among his retirement achievements was the publication of The Wests of Coles Island, The Story of a Family, in 1982. Judge West died February 24, 1985.
