= Peter Wilkins =

British visual artist

- Born: July 26, 1968 (age 58)
- Occupation: Visual artist
- Website: www.wilkins.ws

Peter Wilkins (born July 26, 1968) is a British multimedia artist living in Newfoundland, Canada. He is best known for his kinetic portraits, in particular, 12 Kinetic Portraits of Canadian Writers. These works have been exhibited at The Rooms Provincial Gallery in St. John's, Newfoundland and Labrador and the entire suite was purchased by the Portrait Gallery of Canada in 2008. He was the first artist-in-residence at Memorial University of Newfoundland.

Wilkins has appeared on British television, as co-host in Dom Joly's Happy Hour for Sky TV. The pair travelled the world exploring global drinking habits and how different cultures approached alcohol. Wilkins also accompanied Dom Joly in Excellent Adventures, again for Sky TV and broadcast on the OLN network in Canada.

== Personal life ==
Wilkins grew up in Leicestershire, England. He attended Stowe School in Buckinghamshire and then studied computing and business at the West London Institute of Higher Education (now Brunel University). Wilkins lived in London until 1991 when he moved to Canada and then Prague. Since 1998, he has lived in Newfoundland and Labrador, Canada.

== Art ==
=== Large format still life ===
These works were a significant part of Wilkins' work in About Turn: Newfoundland in Venice—an official exhibition at the 55th Venice Biennale. They are large format, (6 ft x 4 ft) photographic artworks which incorporate the classic Dutch still life of the 17th century, mid 20th century color-field abstract expressionism melded with contemporary large format photography. Each artwork studies a single colour – so, Red, for instance is made up of cooked lobster, strawberries, red wine, red apples, raspberries, roses, steak (rare) and paint to reference the history of still life. All this items are photographed individually and then arranged in horizontal lines that create new patterns, tonal changes of colour and relationships between the items. The artworks are conceived to work on a number of levels –the viewers initial impression is of a red image, but upon closer inspection the documentary detail of the still life is revealed. The scale is also important as it helps the viewer become lost in colour and then discover the detail. The colours used are Red, White, Blue and Yellow.

=== Music portraits ===
A new series of Kinetic Portraits based on Canadian musicians, including solo artists and groups of all genres. James Ehnes, Hey, Rosetta!, Kid Koala and Sam Roberts were all exhibited at the Venice Biennale. The series is currently in process.

=== New Grooves ===
New Grooves is inspired by album covers and are Wilkins's endeavor to capture the colour and pictorial elements of the original album artwork. These elements are digitally re-mixed and abstractly represented as circular artworks – mimicking the scale and size of the vinyl record using the original artwork to create a new emblematic aesthetic of the album cover. At first glance the works are experiments in colour. A playful element ensues as the view tries to guess the source of the cover. These works will be shown at the Toronto International Art Fair, 2013.

=== Loop – Architecture of Toronto ===
Loop was a featured exhibition of the Scotiabank Contact Photography Festival, Toronto, 2011 at the Textile Museum of Canada. Loop features Wilkins' recent work with Toronto urban spaces, consisting of a series of photographs.

=== The Colour of Wine ===
The Colour of Wine investigates and celebrates the varying and contrasting colours of wine. They also document and present the tonal shifts and depth of colour within a glass of wine. The wines featured in this series are Beaujolais (Gamay), Cabernet Sauvignon, Chardonnay, Malbec, Pinot Grigio, Pinot Noir, Shiraz and Zinfandel.

=== Kinetic Portraits ===
In 2004, Wilkins exhibited his first series of Kinetic Portraits which were of 12 Prominent Newfoundlanders. Kinetic Portraits of 12 Prominent Newfoundlanders was on exhibit at the Confederation Centre Art Gallery in Charlottetown, Prince Edward Island. The exhibit marked the 60th year of Newfoundland's Confederation with Canada.

In 2005 and 2006, Wilkins created 12 Kinetic Portraits of Canadian Writers. Combining explorations of portraiture, technology and interpretation, these portraits feature representations of twelve celebrated Canadian writers, including Margaret Atwood, Roch Carrier, Austin Clarke, Douglas Coupland, Wayne Johnston, Anne-Marie MacDonald, Alistair MacLeod, Yann Martel, Anne Michaels, David Adams Richards, Jane Urquhart and M.G. Vassanji. Off-camera, Wilkins has engaged his sitters in a series of personal questions, exploring their hopes, fears and ideals. The resulting likenesses embody the process of "sitting" itself, pushing the traditional idea of portraiture by adding the dimension of time. The exhibition was curated by Bruce Johnson for The Rooms Provincial Art Gallery in St. John's, Newfoundland.

The Portrait Gallery of Canada acquired 12 Kinetic Portraits of Canadian Writers in 2008.

=== Gander International ===
Gander International is an exploration of the design and aesthetic of late 1950s modernism at Gander International Airport in Gander, Newfoundland and Labrador. Wilkins used a range of processes, from the durational to the optical to present the airport in a new light.

This collection was included as part of Newtopia, an exhibition curated by Bruce Johnson at The Rooms in St. John's, Newfoundland in 2008/2009 that explored key developments in modern Newfoundland, considering the new province's early decades as a series of Utopian experiments.

== 55th Venice Biennale ==
In 2013, Peter Wilkins and Will Gill were officially selected by curator Massimiliano Gioni to exhibit as a collateral project with the 55th Venice Biennale. Organised by the Terra Nova Art Foundation, the exhibition was titled About Turn: Newfoundland in Venice, Will Gill & Peter Wilkins. The exhibition was co-curated by Mireille Eagan and Bruce Johnson. It was on display at Galleria Ca'Rezzonico until November 24, 2013.

== Artist in Residence ==
In 2009, Wilkins was Artist in Residence at Memorial University of Newfoundland. During his tenure, he focused on creating a range of group portraits within the Faculty of Arts.

== Television ==
=== Excellent Adventures ===
In 2005, Wilkins joined Dom Joly in a documentary as part of a series on Sky One. Dom Joly's Excellent Adventure involved the two travelling to Beirut for the first time since Joly left in the late 1980s, and embarking on a road trip through the Syrian Desert to find a cave in which Joly had scrawled his name as a child. They did discover it after much searching.

=== Dom Joly's Happy Hour ===
Dom Joly's Happy Hour is a spoof travel investigation in which Joly and Wilkins team up to explore drinking habits around the world. They travelled to the Southern States of the U.S., Russia, Australia, Europe and India. During the first documentary the pair explored Miami drinking styles, then met up with some hillbillies in the Appalachians tasting moonshine, and visited a gay cowboy bar in Atlanta before taking on the Christian right in Alabama's dry counties. After that, the pair travelled to Russia, trying 80% alcohol (by volume) homemade vodka known as Samogon. They then visited Australia, Mexico and Europe before ending the tour in India.

The DVD was released on October 1, 2007.

== Future projects ==
Churchill Falls is the world's 2nd largest hydroelectric plant. Wilkins plans to artistically capture and represent the enormous hydro generating power of the Churchill Falls Hydro Plant, building on his existing techniques, from creating abstract patterns with photographic realism and using time based works focusing on the movement, relationship and evolvement of colour and form.

== Books ==
Johnson, Bruce. (2009). Disturbing the Universe: The Art of Peter Wilkins. Vinegar Hill Press. ISBN 978-0-9812467-0-3.
