= Heather Goodchild =

Canadian artist

- Born: 1977 (age 48–49); Toronto
- Education: Ryerson University
- Occupation: Artist

Heather Goodchild (born 1977) is a Canadian artist and costume designer who produces paintings and textile art installations. She has exhibited in Berlin, Los Angeles, Miami, New York, Toronto and throughout Canada. Recurring themes in her work include symbolism, rituals, regalia, societies, traditions, morality, and personal fulfilment.

== Early life ==
Goodchild was born in Toronto in 1977.

== Education ==
Goodchild studied fashion design before switching to art, and graduated from Ryerson University with a degree in arts in Fashion Design in 2000.

== Career ==
=== Painting, sculpting, and textile work ===
Goodchild's Anna Ward Brouse exhibit centred around a fictional Victorian matron with a strong work ethic. In 2012, as the Art Gallery of Ontario's artist-in-residence, she created the modernist Uniform Factory exhibit – which included a garment assembly line with Shaker slogans and masonic icons.

In 2013, her work with fabric representations of legends, myths, and secret societies was featured in the Textile Museum of Canada.

In 2014, she created a series of watercolour portraits for the Doug Paisley video Until I find you. Also in 2014, Goodchild was awarded the Canada Council for the Arts studio residency, based in Paris.

Her piece "Dogs" was one of nine miniature art installations in Spadina Avenue, Toronto as part of the Open Field Collective’s 2016 Street Projects.

Goodchild did the cover art for Feist's Let It Die re-release in 2018.

In 2019, Goodchild was awarded the Chalmers Arts Fellowship.

She has attended the Skopelos Foundation for the Arts, in Greece, and the Varda Artists Residence program in California.

In 2020, she exhibited at The Rooms gallery in St John's, Newfoundland.

In 2021, she exhibited at Clint Roenisch Gallery in Toronto. In November and December 2021 she exhibited at Wisconsin Museum of Quilts & Fibre Arts inaugural Exhibition of Contemporary Rugs.

=== Film work ===
Goodchild has worked as a costume designer for the 2006 television show What It's Like Being Alone and the 2002 short film Evelyn: The Cutest Evil Dead Girl.

She has worked on set for the 2002 film Chicago, the 2001 short film Full, the 2001 film Don't Say A Word and the 2014 short film A Tale of Bad Luck.
