= Barbara Pratt =

Canadian painter (born 1963)

- Born: February 16, 1963 (age 63); Salmonier, Newfoundland, Canada
- Education: Acadia University
- Known for: Painter
- Parents: Christopher Pratt (father); Mary Pratt (mother)
- Relatives: Ned Pratt (brother); William J. West (grandfather)

Barbara Pratt (born February 16, 1963) is a Canadian painter based in Portugal Cove-St. Philip's Newfoundland.

Pratt grew up in the community of St. Catherine's in St. Mary's Bay, Newfoundland. She attended Rothesay Netherwood School and graduated with a BA from Acadia University. In her early work, she almost exclusively painted the human figure, with a particular emphasis on clothing. Other subjects include flowers and oil tankers related to Newfoundland's offshore oil industry. Her first solo exhibition was held in 1986 at the Spurrell Gallery in St. John's. In 2010, she had an exhibit based on a train trip from Toronto to Vancouver. Two years later, her work was shown at the McMichael Canadian Art Collection.

Pratt is the daughter of painters Christopher Pratt and Mary Pratt (née West). In 2020, she paid homage to her mother in an exhibit entitled Cake, held in St. John's.

== Collections ==
- The Rooms Provincial Art Gallery, St. John's
- Memorial University of Newfoundland and Labrador, St. John's
