= Christian McKiel =

Canadian artist and educator (1889–1978)

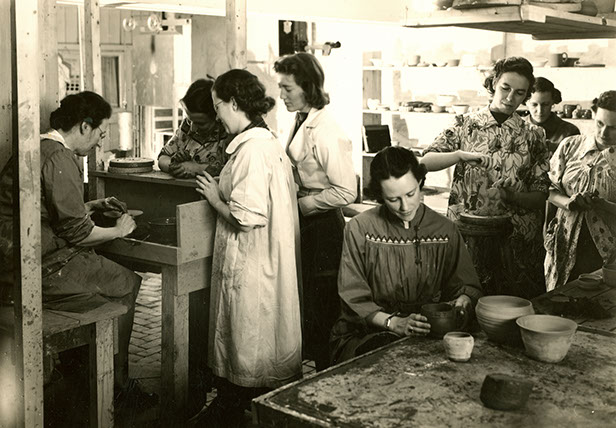
- Born: Christian Harris; Pictou, Nova Scotia
- Died: Sackville, New Brunswick, Canada
- Education: Mount Allison University
- Known for: visual artist, educator

Christian McKiel (September 27, 1889 – December 12, 1978) was a Canadian artist and educator.

== Life and career ==
The daughter of Emma Ives Harris and Joseph Simpson Harris, county sheriff, and sister of Margaret Harris, she was born Christian Harris in Pictou, Nova Scotia. She received a teaching diploma in drawing and a Drawing Certificate from the Ladies' College at Mount Allison University in 1911. From 1911 to 1912, McKiel pursued further studies at the Art Students League of New York. She returned to Sackville in 1913 to teach in the fine arts department at Mount Allison University after the resignation of Sarah (Stewart) Hart. She was an integral in the development of the craft program at the university. During her three decades teaching at Mount Allison University, she conducted classes in drawing, pottery, china painting and general painting.

She married Harry McKiel, later dean of science at the university, in 1917.

Beginning in 1920, she took classes with Frank DuMond in Cape Breton Island over three summers and with Charles Webster Hawthorne in Provincetown, Massachusetts during another summer. She also studied pottery with Kjeld and Erica Deichmann at their studio. Pottery was added to the department's curriculum in the fall of 1938 and taught by McKiel.

In 1937, she acted as consultant to Mount Allison University President George Trueman around the production of blueprints of looms for use in summer programs in adult education at the school. In 1938, she became head of the Applied Arts department at Mount Allison University. McKiel was also the first woman in the Art Department at the university to receive the title of 'Assistant Professor'. She retired from teaching in May of 1949, and earned the title of 'Professor Emeritus' in 1950.

In 1954, McKiel presented an honorary degree to Elizabeth McLeod, her former teacher and colleague, in recognition of her dedication to art education for women.

She exhibited with the Nova Scotia Society of Artists, the Maritime Art Association, the Art Association of Montreal, the Royal Canadian Academy of Arts and the British Empire Society of Arts. She was also a member of the Canadian Society of Painters, Etchers and Engravers.

McKiel died in Sackville at the age of 89.

== Collections ==
- Art Gallery of Nova Scotia
- Owens Art Gallery, Mount Allison University
- Beaverbrook Art Gallery, Fredericton
- Agnes Etherington Art Centre, Queens University, Kingston
