= Tricia Middleton =

- Born: 1972; Vancouver, British Columbia
- Education: Emily Carr University of Art and Design, Concordia University
- Known for: sculptor, installation artist

Tricia Middleton (born 1972) is an installation artist based in Montreal, Quebec. Middleton's artistic practice often involves the creation of elaborate, large-scale installations built out of a variety of materials including trash, wax, craft supplies, and other ephemera. She frequently re-purposes excess material from her studio practice in creating new installation and sculpture-based work. Her work has been collected by the Musée d'art contemporain de Montréal.

== Notable exhibitions ==
In 2009, Middleton exhibited a large installation at the Musée d'art contemporain de Montreal, titled Dark Souls. Taking its title from a novel by Nikolai Gogol, Dark Souls was designed to resemble a decaying bourgeois parlour and involved five connecting rooms, each filled with garbage and refuse, towering sculptures, and two video projections.

In 2012, Middleton created a site-specific installation at the Oakville Galleries at Gairloch Gardens. Titled Form is the Destroyer of Force, Without Severity There Can Be No Mercy, Middleton's installation, like Dark Souls, took found objects like shoes, vases, tea sets, and artificial roses and transformed them into uncanny assemblages covered in wax and glitter. The installation referenced the domestic architecture of the Oakville Galleries at Gairloch Gardens, turning the gallery into a fantastical home in decay.

Middleton participated in a large-scale group exhibition titled Misled by Nature: Contemporary Art and the Baroque organized by the National Gallery of Canada, and exhibited at the Art Gallery of Alberta in Edmonton in 2013, and the Museum of Contemporary Canadian Art in Toronto in 2014. The exhibition, which featured other prominent Canadian and international artists including David Altmejd, Yinka Shonibare MBE, and Sarah Sze, considered material excess and theatricality in recent installation art, and questioned the nature-culture divide. Other notable group exhibitions include Nothing to Declare: Current Sculpture from Canada at The Power Plant in Toronto in 2009, and the Quebec Triennial at the Musée d'art contemporain in Montreal in 2008.

Middleton was represented by the now-closed Jessica Bradley Gallery in Toronto. There she exhibited small sculptures based on her prior large-scale installations at the commercial gallery, in an exhibition titled Tricia Middleton: Making Friends with Yourself (2015).

In 2023, Middleton published her first book, Obsidian Situations, in which "Parisian psychogeography unfolds through a practice of visionary mediumship drenched in melancholy and punctured by polemics. At once a singular transmission of eternal loss, a hilarious critique of the present, and a painstaking search among the ruins of rococo, this is writing with the ironic ring of truth."
