= Robert Newton Hurley =

Canadian artist (1894-1980)

Robert Hurley
- Born: Robert Newton Hurley; 1894; London, England
- Died: 1980 (aged 85–86); Victoria, BC
- Known for: artist

Robert Newton Hurley (1894, London, England - 1980, Victoria, British Columbia, Canada), who signed his work R.N. Hurley, was an English-born painter who, after immigrating to Canada in 1923, became known for his watercolor paintings of the Saskatchewan landscape and sky.

== Career ==
Hurley had little formal training as a painter. As a teenager, he worked multiple jobs in England, including as a form-laborer and an apprentice printer-compositor. He later served during World War I in the Suffolk Regiment and afterwards became interested in painting. He took lessons in watercolour painting in London and studied the English watercolour painters such as John Sell Cotman before emigrating to Canada in his twenties. In Canada, he worked on the Canadian Pacific Railway and as an itinerant laborer before settling down in Saskatoon, Saskatchewan.

During the Great Depression, Hurley began to use his extra time to paint, focusing on the prairie landscapes, skies, and grain elevators near Saskatoon. Hurley came to the attention of Ernest Lindner when he took several night classes from Lindner at the Saskatoon Technical Collegiate Institute. From 1942-1958, Hurley worked for the University of Saskatchewan and continued painting.

In 1958, Hurley was given an artist's grant from the Government of Saskatchewan that allowed him to paint full time. In his later life, he and his wife moved to Victoria, British Columbia, where he died in 1980.

Hurley has often been called Saskatchewan's "Sky Painter" for his "effective use of watercolour to illuminate the prairie sky." Artists and curators say he was important for the colour-field painters that followed him.
