= Christopher Pratt =

Canadian painter and printmaker (1935–2022)

Christopher Pratt CC ONL
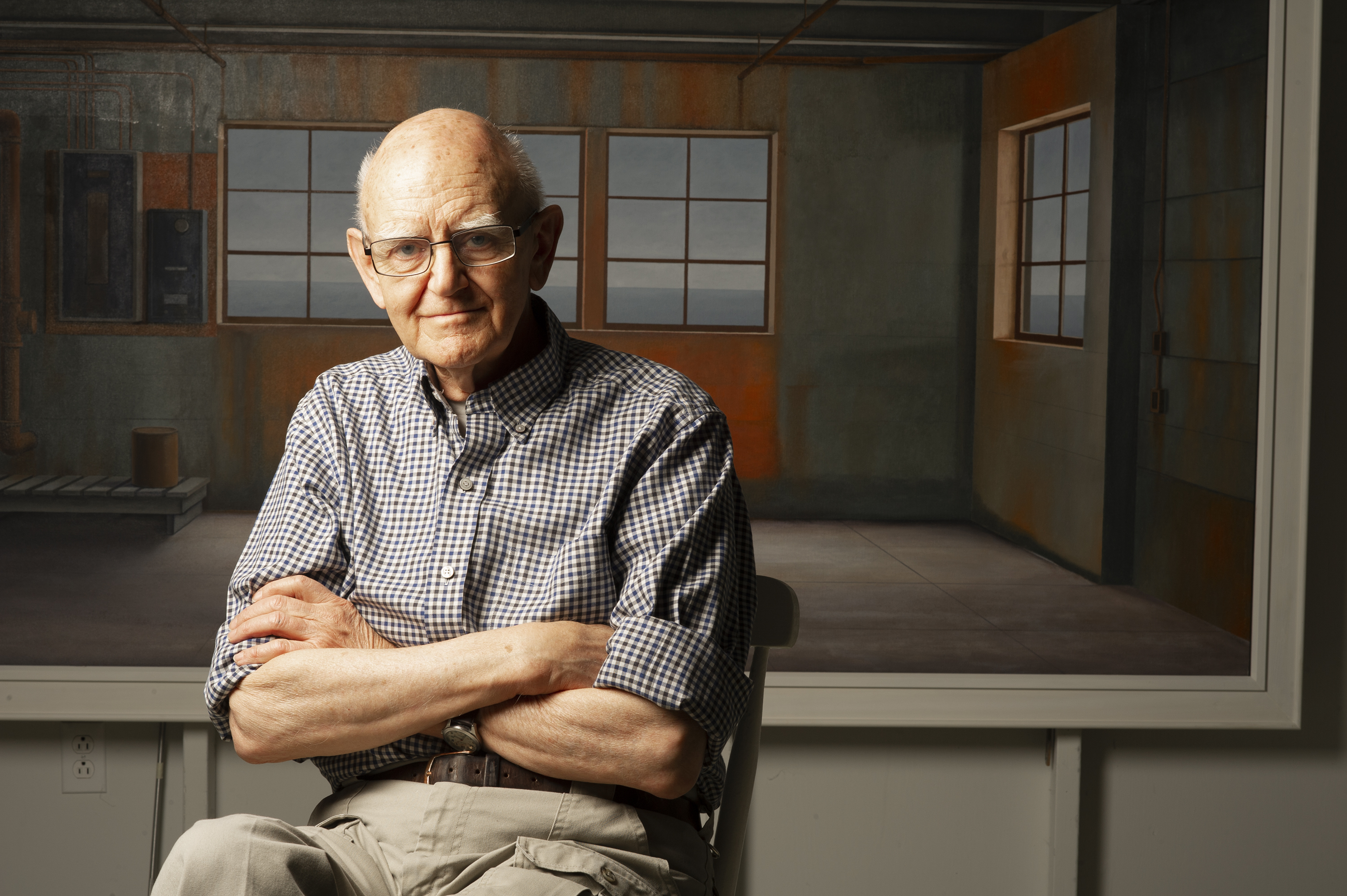
- Christopher Pratt in front of "Argentia Interior: The Ruins of Fort McAndrew" in a photo by Ned Pratt
- Born: John Christopher Pratt; December 9, 1935; St. John's, Newfoundland
- Died: June 5, 2022 (aged 86); Salmonier, Newfoundland and Labrador, Canada
- Education: Mount Allison University, Glasgow School of Art
- Known for: Painter, printmaker
- Spouses: Mary Pratt (m. 1957; div. 2004); Jeanette Meehan (m. 2007; div. 2016)
- Children: 4; including Barbara and Ned

John Christopher Pratt CC ONL RCA (December 9, 1935 – June 5, 2022) was one of Canada's most prominent painters and printmakers. In addition to a body of highly acclaimed paintings, prints, drawings and writing, he designed the flag of Newfoundland and Labrador.

== Early life and education ==
Pratt was born in St. John's, Newfoundland, on December 9, 1935. He first started painting watercolours in 1952 and won the provincial government's Arts and Letters Competition for his piece titled Shed in a Storm. He initially studied pre-engineering at Memorial University of Newfoundland in the autumn of 1952 before relocating to New Brunswick the following year to study pre-medicine at Mount Allison University. However, he quickly became interested in fine arts, especially painting. He was encouraged to paint by Lawren P. Harris and Alex Colville.

From 1957 to 1959, Pratt studied at the Glasgow School of Art in Scotland. During the summers, he returned to Newfoundland to work as a construction surveyor at the American Naval Base at Argentia. The training he received in precise measuring was applied to his paintings. In 1959 Pratt returned to Mount Allison University to complete a Bachelor of Fine Arts degree in 1961. During this period he began to make silkscreen prints. The early screen print Boat in Sand, 1961 in the National Gallery's collection was produced at this time and included in the Gallery's fourth Biennial Exhibition. The praise it received from the biennial jury launched Pratt's career.

== Career ==
Provincial flag of Newfoundland and Labrador, designed by Pratt and adopted in 1980

Pratt's subjects included landscapes, architecture, and occasionally figure work.

I have a profound sense of the power of ordinariness, and of ordinary things ... I mean ordinary in the sense that this is a person, place or thing that has nothing going for it but the fact of its own existence, the fact that it is....

In making prints, Pratt worked from studies to the silkscreen, using abstracted collages.

In 1961, Pratt accepted the position of curator at the newly opened Memorial University Art Gallery in St. John's. He remained at the gallery for two and a half years before deciding to concentrate on his painting full-time, moving his family to Salmonier, Newfoundland.

His work was the subject of a major touring retrospective organized by the Vancouver Art Gallery in 1985, a touring print retrospective and catalogue raisonné, The Prints of Christopher Pratt: 1958-1991 in 1992, a major traveling retrospective exhibition organized by the National Gallery of Canada in 2005, and a ten-year retrospective of his work at The Rooms in 2015.

Pratt's work was also exhibited extensively outside Canada. The Mira Godard Gallery, in association with the Marlborough Gallery, exhibited his work in New York in 1976. In 1982, Mira Godard Gallery and the Canada House Cultural Centre Gallery in London, England, organized a show of Pratt's paintings, prints and drawings; the show toured Paris, Brussels and Dublin. A collection of Pratt's silkscreen prints, created between 1960 and 1982, traveled to Rome, Glasgow, Berkshire, Dublin and Vienna (1983 - 1985) and, in 1986, several of Pratt's prints were featured by the American Associated Artists Gallery in New York. Two years later, a number of Pratt's paintings were exhibited at the 49th Parallel Gallery in New York.

Pratt served on the Canadian government's Stamp Design Advisory Committee from 1972 to 1975 and on the board of the Canada Council for the Arts from 1975 to 1981. In 1980, at the request of the Government of Newfoundland and Labrador, Pratt designed the Provincial Flag of Newfoundland and Labrador. His work is found in the public collections of the National Gallery of Canada in Ottawa, the Vancouver Art Gallery, The Rooms, and the Art Gallery of Nova Scotia.

== Personal life ==
Pratt met artist Mary West at Mount Allison University. They married in 1957 and had five children: John, Anne, Barbara, Ned, and David, who died in infancy. The couple divorced in 2004. He later married Jeanette Meehan, who was his studio assistant, in 2007; they divorced in 2016.

Pratt lived and worked in the community of St. Catherine's, in a region often referred to simply as Salmonier, Mount Carmel at the head of St. Mary's Bay, from 1963 until his death. He died on the morning of June 5, 2022, at his home on the bank of the Salmonier River. He was 86 years old.

== Works ==
- Boat in Sand (1961)
- Good Friday (1973)
- March Night (1976)
- March Crossing (1977)
- Benoit's Cove: Sheds in Winter (1998)

== Awards and honours ==
Pratt became an associate of the Royal Canadian Academy of Arts (ARCA) and a member of the Canadian Society of Graphic Art in 1965, at the age of 30. Eight years later, he was appointed an officer of the Order of Canada, before becoming a companion of the Order in 1983. He was awarded the Order of Newfoundland and Labrador in 2018.

Pratt was awarded an honorary doctorate by Memorial University of Newfoundland in 1972.

In 2018, Pratt was the subject of Kenneth J. Harvey's documentary film Immaculate Memories: The Uncluttered Worlds of Christopher Pratt.
