= Jonathan Shaughnessy =

Canadian curator

- Known for: curator of contemporary art

Jonathan Shaughnessy is a Canadian curator in the field of contemporary art. In 2022, he was made Director, Curatorial Initiatives at the National Gallery of Canada. He is also an adjunct professor with the Department of Visual Arts at University of Ottawa.

== Career ==
Jonathan Shaughnessy received his Bachelor of Fine Arts in Art History from Concordia University in 2001 and his Masters of Communications from Carleton University in 2004.

Shaughnessy has worked with numerous Canadian and international artists. As Assistant Curator of Contemporary Art, he curated One, Some, Many: 3 Shows by Carsten Höller at Shawinigan Space in Shawinigan, Quebec in 2007. This was the artist's first solo exhibition in Canada. In 2010, Shaughnessy was coordinating curator of the exhibition Pop Life: Art in a Material World for the National Gallery of Canada, organized by Tate Modern.

Notable exhibitions include Vera Frenkel: Ways of Telling at the Museum of Contemporary Canadian Art in 2014. Shaughnessy was also organizing curator of Builders, the Canadian contemporary art biennial, which was exhibited at the National Gallery of Canada from November 2011 to February 2012. He also curated Louise Bourgeois: 1911-2010, which was exhibited at the National Gallery of Canada and Museum of Contemporary Canadian Art in 2011-2013. In 2013 and 2014, Shaughnessy co-curated Misled by Nature: Contemporary Art and the Baroque with Josée Drouin-Brisebois and Catherine Crowston for the Art Gallery of Alberta and Museum of Contemporary Canadian Art. The exhibition included work by Sarah Sze, Yinka Shonibare, Tricia Middleton, David Altmejd, Lee Bul and Bharti Kher.

In addition to curatorial projects, Shaughnessy has written for numerous exhibition catalogues. In 2005, he contributed an essay to The Elements of Nature featuring the work of Michael Snow, Irene Whittome, Liz Magor, Martin Honert, Giuseppe Penone and others. He has also written for Cai Guo-Qiang: Long Scroll, Three Shows by Carsten Höller, and Art Metropole: The Top 100.
