= Will Gill =

Canadian visual artist

- Born: Christopher William Gill; July 5, 1968 (age 58); Ottawa, Ontario, Canada
- Education: Mount Allison University
- Known for: Photography, Installation art, Video art, Painting, Sculpture
- Website: www.williamgill.ca

Christopher William (Will) Gill (born July 5, 1968) is a Canadian visual artist known for his wide-ranging works in sculpture, painting, photography, video and installation art.

== Biography ==
Born and raised in Ottawa, Ontario, Canada, Gill received his Bachelor of Fine Arts in 1991 from Mount Allison University, where he studied sculpture and printmaking. In 1997, he moved to St. John's, Newfoundland. "Some of Gill's notable works have drawn upon the Newfoundland landscape. In the 2009 performance Cape Spear, he tossed fibreglass-encased glow sticks off of the easternmost point of North America using a catapult." "The 2009 installation Bareneed is a replica of a cast-iron bathtub that Gill saw on the bottom of the ocean floor while sea-kayaking near the titular coastal community (the artist himself has noted that the St. John's setting has been key to his art production)." In March 2013, Gill was selected from a group of 31 artists to create an indoor public art installation in the lobby of a new office building in St. John's, set to open in the spring of 2014 - the first private juried art commission in the province awarded to a local artist. From June to November 2013, he exhibited along with artist Peter Wilkins as part of an official Collateral Project at the 2013 Venice Biennale. Gill was longlisted for the Sobey Art Award, Canada's preeminent contemporary art award, in 2004, 2006, and 2023.

== Career ==
Workhorse, 1998

"Like many university students, Gill sought out a new setting for an opportunity to grow as an art student. 'I studied sculpture at Mount Allison University because I had grown up in Ottawa and needed to be in a new environment,' he says. 'I had no idea what to expect from a BFA program, but I knew that being creative excited me. I ended up majoring in sculpture and printmaking because they were both mediums that relied heavily on materials and processes: often it was not about what you ended up with, but how you got there that mattered most. I liked troubleshooting and figuring out how things could be put together. The qualities of materials fascinated me.'"

Lighthouse, 2003

After an inspirational journey around the Avalon Peninsula in 1996, Will Gill decided to move to St. John's, Newfoundland, where he was soon offered an opportunity to work as an apprentice at the bronze casting foundry located at the Boreal Sculpture Park and Garden Foundry, run by sculptor Luben Boykov and environmentalist John Evans. "'There was something about the people and place when I came here that seemed just perfect for the way I am, the way I like to live,' he says. 'The temperament of the people, the generosity and so on. And it was that that made me think right away: this is it. I fell in love right away.'" He has lived in St. John's ever since.

Because of his apprenticeship, and later his work as a technician at the foundry, Gill's early sculptural works often incorporated elements of cast bronze, along with wood and other natural materials. "It is informed by contrasts and juxtapositions, the most obvious being the dichotomy between nature and culture, but he also plays with that of the traumatic and the monotonous, the exuberant and the upsetting and, of course, the man-made and the natural." Line of Green Stars (1998) exemplifies these characteristics.

"Interestingly, Gill never cuts a tree for his sculptures; instead, he recycles and reclaims fallen trees and dead wood that he finds in the forest or salvages from building demolition sites. An example of such recycling is the wood coming from the infamous Mount Cashel orphanage ground. The main building was levelled four years ago, many years after the scandal of sexual and physical child-abuses by Christian Brothers. Trees were also cut down to put up a supermarket. The maple the artist recovered from the site is found in his work titled Workhorse (1998), permanently installed at the Boreal Sculpture Park in St. John's. Hanging from the maple beam are some 500 rectangular pieces of birch on bronze rods. While the birch and bronze elements reflect each other by their similarity in size and shape, these two parts of the sculpture present opposing qualities. The marks left by the chainsaw stand as witness of the artist's intentions while conferring roughness, solidity, and strength to the piece. In contrast, the mirror image hung on bronze rods that is animated when the wind blows is delicate and lyrical in feeling."

Black Water, 2012

Gill has a particular fascination with large scale works of art. In 2001, Gill attended the prestigious Vermont Studio Center where he was an artist-in-residence in sculpture. While there he created Automated Butterfly Catching Unit (2001), a large sculptural work, now in the collection of the Province of Newfoundland and Labrador, previously exhibited at The Rooms provincial gallery. The site-specific work Lighthouse (2003), constructed in the woods at the MacLaren Art Centre in Barrie, Ontario, is 18 feet in height. "In this work Gill created a protection device usually situated on the physical boundaries of water and land. Traditionally a lighthouse's purpose is to warn of nature's destructive force - to protect people from danger; Gill's lighthouse is intended to do the opposite. His creation can be perceived as a warning sign to protect the old trees, a natural heritage, against industrialization, as well as suggesting a historical link connecting Simcoe County's past, its present, and its future". Cloud (2006), a whimsical sculptural work also 18 feet tall, was named as one of the 25 greatest works of art ever made in Newfoundland and Labrador.

Firefly #1, 2011

Bicycle/Leaf, 2013

Gill's paintings, which he creates in small and sometimes very large scale sizes in his private studio, have been described as "simplistic and layered...invitingly crafted and coloured." "Cemetery Park (2008) is as frisky and playful as Gum Machine (2008) (both acrylic and collage on panel), with the tombstones and crosses of the former as animated and full of bouncy colours as the latter's gumballs. Others pinwheel and spring with clouds of vanilla and spokes of red and orange. Their energy vaults from the walls." His newer painted works, such as Smokestack/Flower (2010) and Black Water (2012) continue this theme. Gill's paintings have been exhibited locally, as well as nationally and internationally.

In recent years, Gill has expanded his artistic scope by adding performance, video, and photography to his repertoire. "For his 2009 work Cape Spear, he used a massive catapult to launch glowing orbs off the tip of North America's easternmost point (Cape Spear) and into the ocean. The work was documented with photo and video. He's also often inspired by his adopted home of Newfoundland: his 2009 installation Bareneed is a replica of an old-fashioned bathtub that Gill saw on the ocean floor while sea-kayaking in the coastal community of Bareneed." Firefly #1 (2011) is a still image taken from Gill's video work Firefly (2011), commissioned for the Electric Speed project which commemorated the anniversary of the birth of Marshall McLuhan. The concept for the video "came about through a kind of meditation on the nature of contemporary communication in Newfoundland.... and the images of light moving through the picture frame were meant to convey signals frantically going back and forth as word spread about an accident. Cell phone signals perhaps".

In his haunting installation, High Water, at Toronto's Nuit Blanche 2012, "ghostly objects float on the surface of a small pond in the shadow of Roy Thompson Hall, like lost possessions after a disaster - a baby onesie, a bicycle, a gas canister". Gill then captured the eerie scene in series of photographs. Bicycle/Leaf (2013) is one such image.

In 2013, Peter Wilkins and Will Gill were officially selected by curator Massimiliano Gioni to exhibit at an official Collateral Event of the 55th Venice Biennale. Organised by the Terra Nova Art Foundation, the exhibition was titled About Turn: Newfoundland in Venice, Will Gill & Peter Wilkins. The exhibition was co-curated by Mireille Eagan and Bruce Johnson. It was on display at Galleria Ca'Rezzonico until November 24, 2013.

In 2014, 351 Water Street, a new office tower in downtown St. John's, Newfoundland, was opened. It features Gill's Black Island Punt (2014) on permanent display in the lobby. Gill's proposal for a full-sized stained-glass filled traditional wooden fishing vessel was one of 31 submissions from qualified artists and artistic groups from all around the world, and was the first private juried art commission in the province, valued at $100,000, awarded to a local artist. Gill worked with master boatbuilder Jerome Canning on the piece, which was inspired by the original Black Island Punt crafted by fisherman John Dorey in Notre Dame Bay in the 1950s. "The goal was to create an effect that would be at once magical, wondrous and filled with life" Gill says. "I also like the idea of trying to show the inner spirit or life force in things. So several years ago I began to work with light in my work, whether it was emanating out from sculpture, or being reflected off its surface." "I have always liked the structure of things, their internal armature or skeleton. Is there anything more beautiful than the structure of a boat?" he says.

Gill's artwork is also featured in the Newfoundland Room at Canada House, Canada's high commission in London, England, which was officially reopened in early 2015 after an extensive renovation. As part of the makeover Canada House ran a competition for artwork - largely to be translated into area rugs for the palatial reception rooms. Gill's acrylic painting Ocean was recreated as a floor covering. "I actually work on most of my paintings with the canvas directly on the floor, so in this case the image returns to the place it originated." He says the palette of blues against the muted background speaks to the spirit of his home province. "It's an expression of movement, vigour and life that is so much a part of everyday existence in Newfoundland - could be wind patterns, could be an iceberg slowly tracing a course on the ocean. When icebergs float by the narrows of the St John's harbour in spring, the sea becomes an ever-changing landscape, an active landscape."

In the summer of 2017, Gill was commissioned to produce and exhibit a new work of art at the inaugural Bonavista Biennale, in Newfoundland and Labrador. Responding to the rugged location of the event, he installed the iconic "Green Chair" on a rock just off the coast. "It's a sight that’s hard to believe: A delicate, pale-green kitchen chair, sitting on a rock in the middle of a rough-watered ocean cove. Waves break over the chair, foam churning through its narrow spindles. Tides rise around it, submerging its legs, then its seat, then its top rail—and then the chair, delicate and almost seafoam coloured itself, emerges as tides recede again."

In 2017, Gill also participated in the Fogo Island Arts residency program, spending one month at the remote site producing a new body of work called From the Lion's Den, incorporating sculpture, mixed-media textiles and photography. "The body of work is a reminder of how people and place adapt in the face of change. Working in direct response to the land, sea, built environment, and people of Fogo Island, it is a commentary on the nature of preservation and finding balance between progress, community agency, and holding tradition close."

Gill participated in the Bonavista Biennale once more, in 2021, offering an installation piece entitled Camper, in which a truck and camper, painted with retroreflective glass beads, was parked beside the road where it would glow in the headlights of passing cars. "Like much of Gill's recent work, Camper creates contradictory feelings of unease and wonder, an uncanny rendering of childhood nostalgia overlaid with quiet, ghostlike, otherworldly strangeness." This vacant camper, as well as a solitary cabin, a construction and a provision drop were captured in Gill's 2021 "Pandemic Series". "Developed during the latter portion of the global COVID-19 pandemic, it employs staged photography to reflect, in visual terms, imagined scenes from unsettled times... Unusual colour palettes and surreal scenes devoid of figures set the stage to consider absence, aid and imagined rebuilds. This new work extends previous interests in the degree to which we need one another and the importance of greater genuine (less superficial) connections in our lives."

Since 2021, Gill has continued to expand his exploration of photography, installation, and staged imagery with a series of experimental bodies of work. In Escapes (2022), he employed analog photographic methods with long exposures, string lights, and handmade apparatuses to evoke the psychological and imaginative need for liberation in the wake of the COVID-19 pandemic. Concurrently, Text and Place (2022) introduced textual elements into his work, using backlit panels and choreographed movement to merge language and image, prefiguring his later Stage Work series. Beginning in 2023, Stage Work involved meticulously constructed indoor scenes on wooden stages, integrating collected natural and manufactured materials with studio lighting to juxtapose reality and fiction, personal memory, and broader world events. His most recent series, Disassemblies (2026), investigates the collapse of social and political structures through the dramatic destruction of handmade scaffolds and platforms, creating visual metaphors for societal fragility and the spectacle of media-saturated culture. Across these works, Gill maintains a commitment to handmade processes and a fascination with the interplay between the tangible and the imagined.

In 2023, Gill was again nominated for a Sobey Art Award, sharing representation of the Atlantic Canada region on the national longlist, and was awarded the inaugural Theodore Prize by the Beaverbrook Art Gallery, which celebrates the professional accomplishments of an Atlantic Canadian visual artist.

Canadian Art magazine noted that "Gill appreciates the freedoms afforded by living in a collaborative, community-focused scene like that of St. John's. In addition to working as an artist and having his own studio, he also works as a gallery installation technician at The Rooms, Newfoundland and Labrador's provincial museum." "Gill also notes that success in the art world - whether you're in a city large or small - is more a matter of character than of big-name credentials. 'I found that perseverance was the most important thing after graduating. Finding ways to keep making work, and to be around other creative people, is vital as an artist.'"

As well as producing works of art, Gill has also been a member of the jury committee for the St John's Municipal Art Procurement Program, the Newfoundland and Labrador Arts and Letters Awards, as well as the Canada Council for the Arts Project Grants Program.

His work is represented in private and public collections in Canada and internationally.
