= Lawren P. Harris =

Canadian painter, a watercolourist, draughtsman, printmaker, muralist and art educator

- Born: Lawren Phillips Harris; October 10, 1910; Toronto, Ontario, Canada
- Died: April 24, 1994 (aged 83); Ottawa, Ontario, Canada
- Education: Boston Museum of Fine Arts, Central Technical School
- Known for: Painter, Watercolourist, Printmaker
- Spouse: Elizabeth Anne Hammond (1914-2004) (m. 1934)

Lawren Phillips Harris RCA L.L. D. (October 10, 1910 – April 24, 1994) was a Canadian painter, watercolourist, draughtsman, printmaker, muralist, and art educator. He was known for the highly precise style and disciplined execution of his war art, portraits and abstractions. As an art educator and administrator at Mount Allison University, Harris made a considerable contribution to the arts in the Atlantic provinces.

== Biography ==
Harris' earliest influence was his father, Lawren S. Harris of the Group of Seven. He studied from 1931 to 1933 at the Boston Museum of Fine Arts, under Rodney J. Burn and Robin Guthrie, and at Central Technical School, Toronto, under Robert Ross. For three years, he taught evening classes at Northern Vocational School, Toronto, before spending a year as art master at Trinity College School, Port Hope.

With the outbreak of World War II, Harris joined the war effort, first serving as a trooper with The Governor General's Horse Guards (3rd Canadian Armoured Reconnaissance Regiment) during the first three years of the Second World War. Appointed in 1943 as an Official Second World War artist he remained with them in Italy as part of the 5th Armoured Division. In Italy, he worked for some time alongside Charles Comfort.

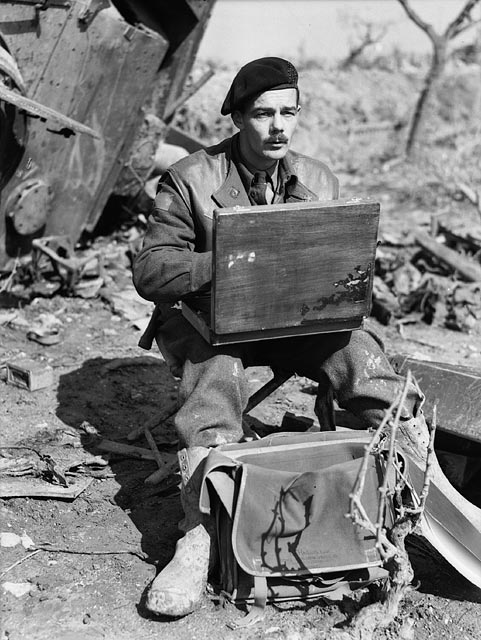
Capt. Lawren Phillip Harris, war artist, Ortona, Italy, circa 1939-1945.

In 1946, he was appointed Director of the School of Fine and Applied Arts at Mount Allison University, Sackville, New Brunswick, where he was soon joined on the teaching faculty by Alex Colville. Harris remained at Mount Allison until 1975 as a professor and administrator, and taught summer programs at the University of British Columbia, Vancouver, and Banff School of Fine Arts.

In 1954 he was one of eighteen Canadian artists commissioned by the Canadian Pacific Railway to paint a mural for the interior of one of the new Park cars entering service on the new Canadian transcontinental train. Each of the murals depicted a different national or provincial park; Harris' was Fundy National Park.

Lawren P. Harris held many solo exhibitions at Canadian universities and participated in numerous group shows, including a two-man show with Jack Humphrey at the Montreal Museum of Fine Arts in 1955. Among his many affiliations, he was a member of the Canadian Group of Painters, Ontario Society of Artists, Royal Canadian Academy of Arts, and Maritime Art Association. Harris held honorary doctorates from Dalhousie University (1971) and Mount Allison University (1976). His work is held in numerous public institutions, including the National Gallery of Canada, Confederation Centre Art Gallery, Canadian War Museum, Art Gallery of Ontario and Beaverbrook Art Gallery.
