= List of postal codes of Canada: A =

This is a list of postal codes in Canada where the first letter is A. Postal codes beginning with A are located within the Canadian province of Newfoundland and Labrador. Only the first three characters are listed, corresponding to the Forward Sortation Area (FSA).

Canada Post provides a free postal code look-up tool on its website, via its mobile apps for such smartphones as the iPhone and BlackBerry, and sells hard-copy directories and CD-ROMs. Many vendors also sell validation tools, which allow customers to properly match addresses and postal codes. Hard-copy directories can also be consulted in all post offices, and some libraries.

== Newfoundland and Labrador ==
There are currently 35 FSAs in this list. As of May 2007, no postal codes yet begin with A3*, A4*, A6* or A7*.

=== Urban ===
A1A
St. John's
North
A2A
Grand Falls-Windsor
A5A
Clarenville
A8A
Deer Lake
A9A
Not assigned
A1B
St. John's
Northwest

Newfoundland & Labrador Provincial Government

A2B
Grand Falls-Windsor
A5B
Not assigned
A8B
Not assigned
A9B
Not assigned
A1C
St. John's
North Central (Downtown Core)
A2C
Not assigned
A5C
Not assigned
A8C
Not assigned
A9C
Not assigned
A1E
St. John's
Central
A2E
Not assigned
A5E
Not assigned
A8E
Not assigned
A9E
Not assigned
A1G
St. John's
South
A2G
Not assigned
A5G
Not assigned
A8G
Not assigned
A9G
Not assigned
A1H
St. John's
Southwest
A2H
Corner Brook
A5H
Not assigned
A8H
Not assigned
A9H
Not assigned
A1J
Not assigned
A2J
Not assigned
A5J
Not assigned
A8J
Not assigned
A9J
Not assigned
A1K
Torbay
A2K
Not assigned
A5K
Not assigned
A8K
Not assigned
A9K
Not assigned
A1L
Paradise
A2L
Not assigned
A5L
Not assigned
A8L
Not assigned
A9L
Not assigned
A1M
Portugal Cove–St. Philip's
A2M
Not assigned
A5M
Not assigned
A8M
Not assigned
A9M
Not assigned
A1N
Mount Pearl
A2N
Stephenville
A5N
Not assigned
A8N
Not assigned
A9N
Not assigned
A1P
Not assigned
A2P
Not assigned
A5P
Not assigned
A8P
Not assigned
A9P
Not assigned
A1R
Not assigned
A2R
Not assigned
A5R
Not assigned
A8R
Not assigned
A9R
Not assigned
A1S
St. John's
Goulds
A2S
Not assigned
A5S
Not assigned
A8S
Not assigned
A9S
Not assigned
A1T
Not assigned
A2T
Not assigned
A5T
Not assigned
A8T
Not assigned
A9T
Not assigned
A1V
Gander
A2V
Labrador City
A5V
Not assigned
A8V
Not assigned
A9V
Not assigned
A1W
Conception Bay South
East
A2W
Not assigned
A5W
Not assigned
A8W
Not assigned
A9W
Reserved
Internal testing
A1X
Conception Bay South
West
A2X
Not assigned
A5X
Not assigned
A8X
Not assigned
A9X
Reserved
Internal testing
A1Y
Carbonear
A2Y
Not assigned
A5Y
Not assigned
A8Y
Not assigned
A9Y
Not assigned
A1Z
Not assigned
A2Z
Not assigned
A5Z
Not assigned
A8Z
Not assigned
A9Z
Reserved
Internal testing

=== Rural ===
A0A
Southeastern Avalon Peninsula

1A0: Aquaforte
1B0: Avondale
1C0: Bay Bulls
1E0: Bay de Verde
1G0: Bay Roberts
1H0: Bell Island Front
1J0: Shea Heights
1K0: Brigus
1L0: Broad Cove
1M0: Burnt Point
1N0: Calvert
1P0: Cape Broyle
1R0: Caplin Cove
1S0: Cappahayden
1V0: Chapel Cove
1W0: Clarke's Beach
1X0: Coleys Point South
1Y0: Colliers Riverhead
1Z0: Conception Harbour
2B0: Cupids
2G0: Fermeuse
2H0: Ferryland
2L0: Grates Cove
2M0: Harbour Grace
2N0: Harbour Grace South
2P0: Harbour Main
2R0: Holyrood
2S0: Jobs Cove
2W0: Lower Island Cove
2X0: Makinsons
2Z0: Marysvale
3A0: Mobile
3B0: Northern Bay
3C0: North River
3E0: Ochre Pit Cove
3G0: Old Perlican
3H0: Petty Harbour
3J0: Port de Grave
3L0: Pouch Cove
3M0: Red Head Cove
3N0: Renews
3P0: Riverhead Harbour Grace
3R0: St. Shott's
3S0: Salmon Cove
3V0: Shearstown
3W0: South River
3X0: Spaniard's Bay
4A0: Tors Cove
4B0: Trepassey
4E0: Upper Island Cove
4G0: Victoria
4H0: Bell Island
4J0: Western Bay
4K0: Witless Bay
4L0: Woodfords

A0B
Western Avalon Peninsula

1A0: Arnold's Cove
1B0: Bellevue
1C0: Blaketown
1E0: Branch
1G0: Brigus Junction
1H0: Brownsdale
1J0: Cavendish
1K0: Chance Cove
1L0: Chapel Arm
1M0: Colinet
1N0: Come By Chance
1P0: Dildo
1R0: South Dildo
1S0: Dunville
1T0: Fair Haven
1V0: Fox Harbour
1W0: Freshwater
1X0: Greens Harbour
1Y0: Hants Harbour
1Z0: Heart's Content
2A0: Heart's Delight
2B0: Heart's Desire
2C0: Hopeall
2E0: Islington
2G0: Jerseyside
2H0: Little Harbour East
2J0: Long Harbour
2L0: Mount Arlington Heights
2M0: Mount Carmel
2N0: New Chelsea
2P0: New Harbour
2R0: New Melbourne
2S0: New Perlican
2T0: Norman's Cove
2V0: North Harbour
2W0: Old Shop
2Y0: Placentia
2Z0: St. Brides
3A0: St. Joseph's
3B0: St. Mary's
3C0: St. Vincent's
3E0: Ship Harbour
3H0: Southern Harbour
3J0: Sunnyside
3K0: Whitbourne
3L0: Whiteway
3M0: Winterton

A0C
Bonavista Peninsula

1A0: Bloomfield
1B0: Bonavista
1E0: Bunyan's Cove
1G0: Burgoyne's Cove
1H0: Canning's Cove
1J0: Catalina
1K0: Charleston
1L0: Charlottetown
1M0: Duntara
1N0: Elliston
1P0: Hickman's Harbour
1R0: Keels
1S0: King's Cove
1T0: Knight's Cove
1V0: Lethbridge
1W0: Little Catalina
1Y0: Melrose
1Z0: Musgravetown
2A0: Newman's Cove
2B0: Open Hall
2C0: Plate Cove East
2E0: Plate Cove West
2G0: Port Blandford
2H0: Port Rexton
2J0: Port Union
2K0: Princeton
2M0: Southern Bay
2N0: Summerville
2P0: Sweet Bay
2R0: Tickle Cove
2S0: Trinity

A0E
Burin Peninsula

1A0: Baine Harbour
1B0: Bay L'Argent
1C0: Boat Harbour West
1E0: Burin
1G0: Burin Bay Arm
1H0: Parkers Cove
1K0: Creston
1L0: Creston North
1M0: English Harbour East
1N0: Epworth
1P0: Fortune
1R0: Frenchman's Cove
1S0: Garden Cove
1T0: Garnish
1V0: Gooseberry Cove
1W0: Grand Bank
1X0: Grand Beach
1Y0: Grand Le Pierre
1Z0: Harbour Mille
2A0: Hillview
2B0: Hodge's Cove
2C0: Lamaline
2E0: Lawn
2G0: Lewin's Cove
2H0: Little Bay
2J0: Little Bay East
2K0: Little Heart's Ease
2L0: Little St. Lawrence
2M0: Marystown
2N0: North Harbour
2P0: North West Brook
2R0: Red Harbour
2S0: Rushoon
2T0: St. Bernards-Jacques Fontaine
2V0: St. Lawrence
2W0: Swift Current
2X0: Terrenceville
2Y0: Winterland
2Z0: Monkstown
3A0: Petite Forte
3B0: South East Bight

A0G
Northeast Newfoundland

1A0: Aspen Cove
1B0: Badger's Quay
1C0: Benton
1E0: Birchy Bay
1G0: Boyd's Cove
1H0: Bridgeport
1J0: Brookfield
1K0: Burnside
1L0: Campbellton
1M0: Cape Freels North
1N0: Carmanville
1P0: Carter's Cove
1R0: Change Islands
1S0: Cottlesville
1T0: Gambo
1V0: Deadman's Bay
1W0: Deep Bay
1X0: Dover
1Y0: Durrell
1Z0: Eastport
2A0: Embree
2B0: Fogo
2C0: Frederickton
2E0: Gambo South
2G0: Gander Bay
2H0: Gander Bay South
2J0: Baytona
2K0: Glenwood
2L0: Glovertown
2M0: Glovertown South
2N0: Greenspond
2P0: Hare Bay
2R0: Herring Neck
2S0: Hillgrade
2T0: Horwood
2V0: Indian Bay
2W0: Island Harbour
2X0: Joe Batt's Arm
2Y0: Ladle Cove
2Z0: Laurenceton
3A0: Lewisporte
3B0: Little Burnt Bay
3C0: Loon Bay
3E0: Lumsden
3G0: Main Point
3H0: Moreton's Harbour
3J0: Musgrave Harbour
3K0: Comfort Cove-Newstead
3L0: Newtown
3M0: Norris Arm
3N0: Norris Arm Northside
3P0: Pool's Island
3R0: Port Albert
3S0: Pound Cove
3T0: Rodgers Cove
3V0: St. Brendan's
3W0: St. Chad's
3X0: Salvage
3Y0: Sandringham
3Z0: Seldom
4A0: Shalloway Cove
4B0: Stag Harbour
4C0: Stoneville
4E0: Summerford
4G0: Templeman
4H0: Tilting
4J0: Tizzard's Harbour
4K0: Traytown
4L0: Trinity
4M0: Twillingate
4N0: Victoria Cove
4P0: Wareham-Centreville
4R0: Wesleyville
4S0: Valley Pond
4T0: Wings Point

A0H
Central Newfoundland

1A0: Badger
1B0: Belleoram
1C0: Bishop's Falls
1E0: Botwood
1G0: Buchans
1H0: Buchans Junction
1J0: Conne River
1L0: Cottrell's Cove
1M0: English Harbour West
1N0: Gaultois
1P0: Harbour Breton
1R0: Head Bay d'Espoir
1S0: Hermitage
1T0: Leading Tickles
1V0: Millertown
1W0: Milltown
1Y0: Peterview
1Z0: Point Leamington
2A0: Point of Bay
2B0: Pools Cove
2C0: Rencontre East
2E0: St. Alban's
2G0: Seal Cove
2J0: McCallum

A0J
Northern Newfoundland

1A0: Beaumont
1B0: Brighton
1E0: Harry's Harbour
1G0: Jackson's Cove
1H0: King's Point
1J0: Little Bay
1K0: Little Bay Islands
1L0: Miles Cove
1M0: Pilley's Island
1N0: Port Anson
1P0: Rattling Brook
1R0: Roberts Arm
1S0: South Brook
1T0: Springdale
1V0: Triton

A0K
Northwest Newfoundland / Southeast Labrador

1A0: Anchor Point
1B0: Baie Verte
1C0: Bartlett's Harbour
1H0: Bellburns
1J0: Bide Arm
1K0: Birchy Head
1L0: Bird Cove
1M0: Black Duck Cove
1N0: Black Tickle
1P0: Bonne Bay
1R0: Brent's Cove
1S0: Burlington
1T0: Lodge Bay
1V0: Cartwright
1W0: Castors River
1X0: Coachman's Cove
1Y0: Conche
1Z0: Cooks Harbour
2A0: Cow Head
2B0: Croque
2C0: Daniel's Harbour
2G0: Eddies Cove
2H0: Eddies Cove West
2J0: Englee
2M0: Fleur de Lys
2N0: Flower's Cove
2P0: Forteau
2V0: Green Island Brook
2W0: Green Island Cove
2X0: St. Lunaire-Griquet
2Y0: Hampden
3A0: Harbour Round
3B0: Hawke's Bay
3E0: Howley
3H0: Jackson's Arm
3K0: L'Anse au Clair
3L0: L'Anse au Loup
3M0: La Scie
3N0: Main Brook
3P0: Mary's Harbour
3R0: Middle Arm
3S0: Ming's Bight
3T0: Nipper's Harbour
3V0: Norris Point
3X0: Pacquet
3Y0: Paradise River
3Z0: Parson's Pond
4A0: Plum Point
4B0: Pollard's Point
4C0: Port au Choix
4E0: Port Hope Simpson
4G0: Portland Creek
4H0: Port Saunders
4J0: Raleigh
4K0: Red Bay
4L0: Reefs Harbour
4M0: River of Ponds
4N0: Rocky Harbour
4P0: Roddickton
4R0: Round Harbour
4S0: St. Anthony
4T0: St. Anthony
4V0: St. Julien's
4W0: St. Lewis
4Y0: St. Pauls
4Z0: Sally's Cove
5C0: Savage Cove-Sandy Cove
5E0: Seal Cove
5G0: Shoe Cove
5H0: Snook's Arm
5K0: Sop's Arm
5P0: Trout River
5R0: Westport
5S0: West St. Modeste
5T0: Wild Cove
5X0: Woodstock
5Y0: Charlottetown

A0L
Western Newfoundland

1A0: Benoit's Cove
1C0: Cox's Cove
1E0: Frenchman's Cove
1G0: Gallants
1H0: Lark Harbour
1J0: Mount Moriah
1K0: Pasadena
1L0: York Harbour

A0M
La Poile Bay Region

1B0: Burnt Islands
1C0: Channel-Port aux Basques
1J0: Isle aux Morts
1K0: La Poile
1P0: Rose Blanche (Rose Blanche-Harbour le Cou)

A0N
Southwest Newfoundland / Port au Port Peninsula

1A0: Aguathuna
1B0: Barachois Brook
1C0: Cape Ray
1E0: Cape St. George
1G0: Cartyville
1H0: Codroy
1J0: Doyles
1K0: Grand Bay East
1M0: Heatherton
1N0: Highlands
1P0: Jeffrey's
1R0: Lourdes
1S0: Noels Pond
1T0: Port au Port
1V0: Robinsons
1W0: St. Andrew's
1X0: St. David's
1Y0: St. Fintan's
1Z0: St. George's
2B0: South Branch
2C0: Stephenville Crossing
2E0: West Bay Centre
2G0: Black Duck Siding
2H0: Burgeo
2J0: Ramea
2K0: François
2L0: Grey River

A0P
Central Labrador

0B2: Sheshatshiu
1A0: Natuashish
1C0: Happy Valley-Goose Bay
1E0: Happy Valley-Goose Bay
1G0: Hopedale
1J0: Makkovik
1K0: Mud Lake
1L0: Nain
1M0: North West River
1N0: Postville
1P0: Rigolet
1S0: Happy Valley-Goose Bay
1T0: Sheshatshiu

A0R
Northern & Western Labrador

1A0: Churchill Falls
1B0: Wabush

A0S
Not in use
A0T
Not in use
A0V
Not in use
A0W
Not in use
A0X
Not in use
A0Y
Not in use
A0Z
Not in use

== Most populated FSAs ==
1. A0A, 44,930
2. A0G, 33,316
3. A1A, 30,086
4. A1E, 26,858
5. A2H, 25,290

== Least populated FSAs ==
1. A0R, 2,661
2. A2B, 4,739
3. A1Y, 5,436
4. A0M, 5,468
5. A1G, 5,808
