= Newfoundland and Labrador Route 210 =

Highway in Newfoundland and Labrador, Canada

Route 210
- Burin Peninsula Highway; Heritage Run; Don Jamieson Highway

Route information
- Maintained by Newfoundland and Labrador Department of Transportation and Infrastructure
- Length: 198 km (123 mi)

Major junctions
- North end: Route 1 (TCH) in Goobies
- Route 214 near Monkstown; Route 211 near Terrenceville; Route 212 near St. Bernard's-Jacques Fontaine; Route 215 near Boat Harbour; Route 220A in Marystown; Route 220 in Marystown; Route 222 in Winterland; Route 213 (East access) near Garnish; Route 213 (West access) near Frenchman's Cove
- South end: Route 220 in Grand Bank

Location
- Country: Canada
- Province: Newfoundland and Labrador

Highway system
- Highways in Newfoundland and Labrador
← Route 205	→ Route 211

Route 210, also known as the Burin Peninsula Highway and Heritage Run, is a highway that extends through the Burin Peninsula from Goobies to Grand Bank, Newfoundland and Labrador. The maximum speed limit is 90 km/h except through communities and settlements where the speed limit is reduced to 50 km/h. Just after exiting Swift Current, until a few kilometres north of Marystown, much of the landscape is barren, with very few trees prevalent. After entering Marystown, motorists approach a junction where they could turn right to continue their journey on Route 210 until arriving at Grand Bank, or going straight onto Route 220 towards Burin and St. Lawrence. Marystown is the most populous community along the route.

== Route description ==
Route 210 begins in Goobies at an intersection with Route 1 (Trans-Canada Highway) and it heads west through downtown and some neighbourhoods before leaving town and crossing a river. The highway heads southwest through rural areas for several kilometres to have intersections with local roads leading to North Harbour (also known as Goose Cove) and Garden Cove. Route 210 now passes through Black River, where it crosses a river of the same name, and Swift Current before paralleling and crossing another river and passing through more rural terrain for several kilometres. It now heads further southwest as it has intersections with Route 214 (Monkstown Road), Route 211 (English Harbour East Road), Route 212 (Bay L'Argent Road), and Route 215 (Petit Forte Road). A ferry to Rencontre East can be accessed via Route 212 and a ferry to South East Bight can be accessed via Route 215. The highway now follows the coastline in the distance as it meets local roads leading to Parkers Cove, Baine Harbour, Rushoon, Red Harbour, Jean de Baie, Spanish Room, Rock Harbour, and Mooring Cove before entering the Marystown town limits. Route 210 passes south through some neighbourhoods before entering a business district and coming to an intersection with Route 220A (Creston Boulevard). Route 210 now makes a sharp right turn and heads west to have partial interchange with Harris Drive before passing through more neighbourhoods and having an intersection with Route 220 (Creston Causeway). Route 210 now leaves Marystown and crosses over a lake before passing through Winterland, where it meets Route 222 (Salt Pond-Winterland Road). The highway now passes through rural areas for several kilometres, where it has two intersections with Route 213 (East and West Access) before following the northern coastline of the peninsula to pass through Grand Beach, Molliers, and L'Anse-au-Loup before entering Grand Bank, where Route 210 transitions to Route 220 at an intersection with Marine Drive.

== Major intersections ==
Location	km	mi	Destinations	Notes
Goobies	0.0	0.0	Route 1 (TCH) – Clarenville, St. John's	Northern terminus
	12.4	7.7	North Harbour Road (Route 210-11) - North Harbour (Goose Cove)	
Black River	17.5	10.9	Garden Cove Road (Route 210-13) - Garden Cove	
	59.8	37.2	Route 214 south (Monkstown Road) – Monkstown, Davis Cove	Northern terminus of Route 214
	64.8	40.3	Route 211 west (English Harbour East Road) – Terrenceville, Grand le Pierre, English Harbour East	Eastern terminus of Route 211
	97.4	60.5	Route 212 north (Bay L'Argent Road) – St. Bernard's-Jacques Fontaine, Bay L'Argent, Harbour Mille	Southern terminus of Route 212; provides access to Rencontre East Ferry
	103.9	64.6	Route 215 east (Petit Forte Road) – Boat Harbour, Brookside, Petit Forte	Western terminus of Route 215; provides access to South East Bight Ferry
	107.9	67.0	Parkers Cove Road - Parkers Cove	
	108.9	67.7	Rushoon Road - Rushoon, Baine Harbour	
	123.0	76.4	Red Harbour Road - Red Harbour	
	135	84	Jean de Baie Road (Route 210-23) - Jean de Baie	
	136	85	Spanish Room Road (Route 210-24) - Spanish Room, Rock Harbour	
Marystown	139	86	Atlantic Street - Mooring Cove	
Marystown	141	88	Atlantic Street - Mooring Cove	
Marystown	144	89	Route 220A south (Creston Boulevard) – Burin, St. Lawrence	Northern terminus of Route 220A
Marystown	145	90	Harris Drive	Southbound exit and northbound entrance
Marystown	148	92	Route 220 west (Creston Boulevard) – Creston North, Burin, St. Lawrence	Eastern terminus of Route 220
Winterland	155	96	Route 222 south (Salt Pond-Winterland Road) – Winterland, Burin	Northern terminus of Route 222
Garnish	160	99	Route 213 west (East Access) – Garnish, Frenchman's Cove	Eastern terminus of Route 213
Frenchman's Cove	167	104	Route 213 east (West Access) – Frenchman's Cove, Frenchman's Cove Provincial Park, Garnish	Western terminus of Route 213
Grand Bank	198	123	Transitions to Route 220 east (Burin Peninsula Highway/Heritage Run) – Fortune, Lamaline	Southern terminus; provides access to Saint Pierre and Miquelon Ferry at Fortune
1.000 mi = 1.609 km; 1.000 km = 0.621 mi: Incomplete access; Route transition

== See also ==
- List of Newfoundland and Labrador highways
