= Pays Cove, Newfoundland and Labrador =

Pays Cove Peys Cove
- Abandoned Town
- Location of Pays Cove in Newfoundland
- Coordinates: 47°39′36.9″N 54°49′20.4″W
- Country: Canada
- Province: Newfoundland and Labrador
- Census division: Division 2
- Census subdivision: Division 2

Population (1945)
  - Total: 7
- Time zone: UTC– 3:30 (Newfoundland Time)
  - Summer (DST): UTC– 2:30 (Newfoundland Daylight)
- Area code: 709
- Bay: Fortune Bay

Pays Cove (sometimes spelled Peys Cove) is an abandoned town in Newfoundland and Labrador, Canada that had a peak population of 11 in 1935.

== History ==
Located directly between the communities of English Harbour East and Grand le Pierre in Fortune Bay, Pays Cove was first settled in the late 1800s by the family of Cyrus White who were recorded in the 1904 Business Directory for the town that year. Its name is presumed to have originated as 'Peas Cove.'

At about 1914, the families of William and Alfred Barnes moved to Pays Cove to settle from Harbour Mille. Their primary occupation was fishing for cod and lobster. With very limited space in the cove for settlement, the community never rose above two or three families throughout its entire occupation. Pays Cove's last resident was Jacob Barnes who lived in the community up until 1980.

== Demographics ==
Pays Cove was first recorded in the 1901 census with a population of two, later identified as the family of Cyrus and Elizabeth White.

In 1921, the families of William and Esther Barnes as well as Alfred and Rebecca Barnes were recorded in Pays Cove for a total population of 9.

In 1936, Newfoundland Directories released a business directory that listed the head of each household with their occupation in the town of Pays Cove. It is adapted below:

1936 Business Directory
Barnes, Alfred	Fisherman
Barnes, William	Fisherman
Barnes, William Thomas	Fisherman

In the 1945 Newfoundland Census, Pays Cove's population was recorded at 7 people.

== See also ==
- English Harbour East
- Grand le Pierre
