= Newfoundland and Labrador Route 214 =

Highway in Newfoundland and Labrador

Route 214
- Monkstown Road

Route information
- Maintained by Newfoundland and Labrador Department of Transportation and Infrastructure
- Length: 28.6 km (17.8 mi)

Major junctions
- South end: Monkstown
- North end: Route 210 near Terrenceville

Location
- Country: Canada
- Province: Newfoundland and Labrador

Highway system
- Highways in Newfoundland and Labrador
← Route 213	→ Route 215

Route 214, also known as Monkstown Road, is a 28.6-kilometre-long (17.8 mi) north–south highway on the Burin Peninsula of the island of Newfoundland in the province of Newfoundland and Labrador. It connects the communities of Monkstown and Davis Cove with Route 210 (Heritage Run/Burin Peninsula Highway). The road is unpaved.

== Route description ==
Route 214 begins at a dead end along the coast in a neighbourhood of Monkstown. It winds its way northeast through town before going more inland to leave Monkstown and have a Y-Intersection with a local road leading to Davis Cove. The highway now curves to the northwest and passes through rural hilly terrain for several kilometres before coming to an end at an intersection with Route 210.

== Major intersections ==
Location	km	mi	Destinations	Notes
Monkstown	0.0	0.0	Dead End along coast	Southern terminus
	8.6	5.3	Davis Cove Road (Route 214-10) - Davis Cove	
	28.6	17.8	Route 210 (Burin Peninsula Highway/Heritage Run) – Swift Current, Marystown, Grand Bank	Northern terminus
1.000 mi = 1.609 km; 1.000 km = 0.621 mi
