= Ryle's Barrisway, Newfoundland and Labrador =

Ryle's Barrisway
- Abandoned Town
- Location of Ryle's Barrisway in Newfoundland
- Coordinates: 47°38′59.8″N 54°45′46.1″W
- Country: Canada
- Province: Newfoundland and Labrador
- Census division: Division 2
- Census subdivision: Division 2

Population (1898)
  - Total: 2
- Time zone: UTC– 3:30 (Newfoundland Time)
  - Summer (DST): UTC– 2:30 (Newfoundland Daylight)
- Area code: 709
- Bay: Fortune Bay

Ryle's Barrisway (sometimes spelled Barachoix) is an abandoned town in Newfoundland and Labrador, Canada that had a small population which was first recorded in 1898.

== History ==
The former community is located about 3 kilometers away from the town of Terrenceville located at the bottom of Fortune Bay. It is centered around the Ryles Barrisway Brook which is the focal point of the community. The community first sprang up as a settlement in 1898 when a significant lobster cannery was established which coincided with the increase of the lobster fishery in the area.

The community of Ryle's Barrisway was recorded in McAlpine's Business Directory of 1898 with 2 heads of households, namely Clement Benning, a "lobster packer" and John Thompson, a "Lobster Can Dealer." In the subsequent 1904 Business Directory, only the family of Clement Benning remained. Use of the area by nearby residents of Terrenceville continued long after it was abandoned and one such resident, Leo Hickey, accidentally died at Ryles Barrisway on February 21, 1928.

The community is currently uninhabited but a few nearby residents have cabins where the community once stood.

== See also ==
- Terrenceville
- English Harbour East
- Grand le Pierre
