= Spanish Room =

Human settlement in Newfoundland and Labrador, Canada

Coordinates: 47.199°N 55.095°W

Location of Spanish Room in Newfoundland and Labrador

Spanish Room is a local service district and designated place in the Canadian province of Newfoundland and Labrador.

This settlement is north of Marystown on the northern harbour. It is accessible from Route 210. Beyond Spanish Room is the settlement of Rock Harbour.

== Geography ==
Spanish Room is in Newfoundland within Subdivision D of Division No. 2.

== Demographics ==
As a designated place in the 2016 Census of Population conducted by Statistics Canada, Spanish Room recorded a population of 131 living in 51 of its 61 total private dwellings, a change of -2.2% from its 2011 population of 134. With a land area of 5.63 km^{2} (2.17 sq mi), it had a population density of 23.3/km^{2} (60.3/sq mi) in 2016.

== Government ==
Spanish Room is a local service district (LSD) that is governed by a committee responsible for the provision of certain services to the community. The chair of the LSD committee is Randy Hanrahan.

== See also ==
- List of communities in Newfoundland and Labrador
- List of designated places in Newfoundland and Labrador
- List of local service districts in Newfoundland and Labrador
