= List of municipalities in Newfoundland and Labrador =

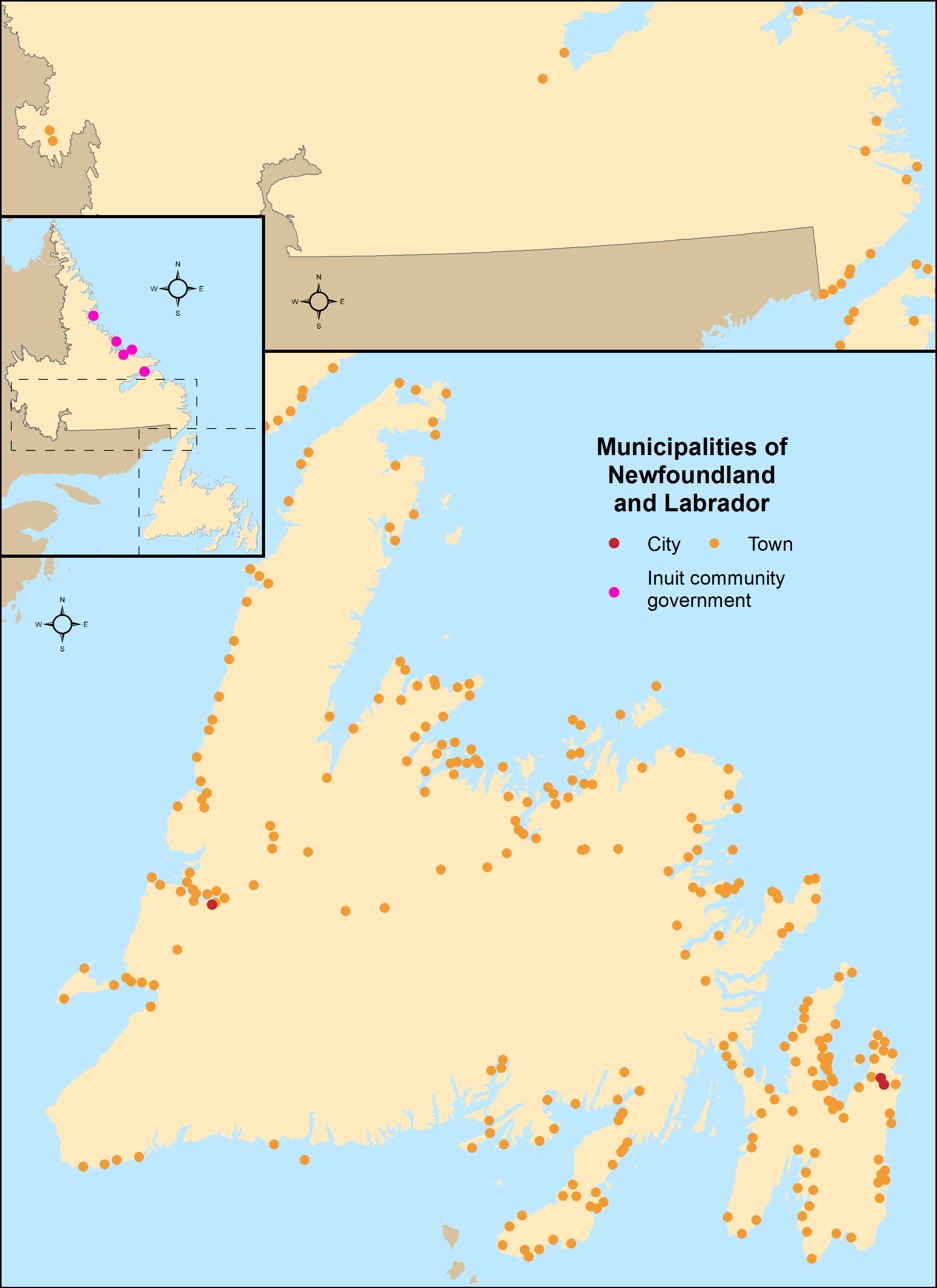
Distribution of Newfoundland and Labrador's 277 municipalities by municipal status type

Newfoundland and Labrador is the ninth-most populous province in Canada, with 510,550 residents recorded in the 2021 Canadian Census, and is the seventh-largest in land area, with 358,170 km^{2} (138,290 mi^{2}). With 94% of the provincial population, Newfoundland and its neighboring islands are significantly more populous than the geographically larger region of Labrador. Newfoundland and Labrador has 274 municipalities, including 3 cities, 266 towns, and 5 Inuit community governments; these communities cover only 2.3% of the province's land mass but are home to 90% of its population.

The towns were created by the Government of Newfoundland and Labrador in accordance with the Municipalities Act, 1999, whereas the three cities were each incorporated under their own provincial statutes. Inuit community governments were created in accordance with the 2005 Labrador Inuit Land Claims Agreement Act. These acts grant the power to enact local bylaws and the responsibility to provide local government services.

St. John's is Newfoundland and Labrador's capital and largest municipality by population and land area. Keels is its smallest municipality by population, and Brent's Cove is the smallest municipality by land area.

== Cities ==
Newfoundland and Labrador has three cities that had a total population of 152,335 in the 2021 Canadian Census. The provincial capital of St. John's is the largest city by population and land area, with 110,525 residents and 446.02 km^{2} (172.21 mi^{2}). Corner Brook is the smallest city by population in the province, with 19,333 residents. Mount Pearl is the smallest by land area, with 15.65 km^{2} (6.04 mi^{2}).

The three cities are governed under their own provincial legislation – the City of St. John's Act, the City of Mount Pearl Act, and the City of Corner Brook Act. These acts give them the power to enact local bylaws and the responsibility to provide local government services.

== Towns ==
The Towns and Local Service Districts Act is the legislation enabling the Lieutenant-Governor in Council to incorporate, amalgamate, and disorganize towns in Newfoundland and Labrador upon recommendation by the Minister of Municipal Affairs and Environment. It also provides opportunities for towns to annex areas, and establish or alter their boundaries. The prerequisite to undertake these actions is the preparation of a feasibility report, which includes a requirement for a public hearing.

Newfoundland and Labrador has 270 towns that had a total population of 304,895 in the 2021 Canadian Census. Fifteen of those towns are in Labrador. Newfoundland and Labrador's largest town by population is Conception Bay South with 27,168 residents and the largest by land area is Baie Verte with 371.37 km^{2} (143.39 sq mi). Little Bay Islands is its smallest town by population with zero residents, and Brent's Cove is the smallest town by land area with 1.02 km^{2} (0.39 sq mi). The province's newest town is George's Brook-Milton, which incorporated on May 8, 2018.

== Inuit community governments ==
Newfoundland and Labrador has five Inuit community governments that had a total population of 2,323 in the 2021 Canadian Census. The largest Inuit community government in the province by population and land area is Nain with 847 residents and 93.50 km^{2} (36.10 mi^{2}). Postville is the smallest Inuit community government by population in the province with 188 residents, while Hopedale is the smallest by land area with 2.18 km^{2} (0.84 mi^{2}).

All five Inuit community governments are within Nunatsiavut, the Inuit Land Claims Area of Labrador. The five Inuit community governments were formed in 2005 with the signing of the Labrador Inuit Land Claims Agreement. The agreement granted them powers similar to other types of municipal governments in the province such as the establishment of a local government, municipal parks and recreation, public libraries, and public advertising. Each community elects at-large a council comprising an angajukkak (mayor) and Inuit community councillors.

== List of municipalities ==
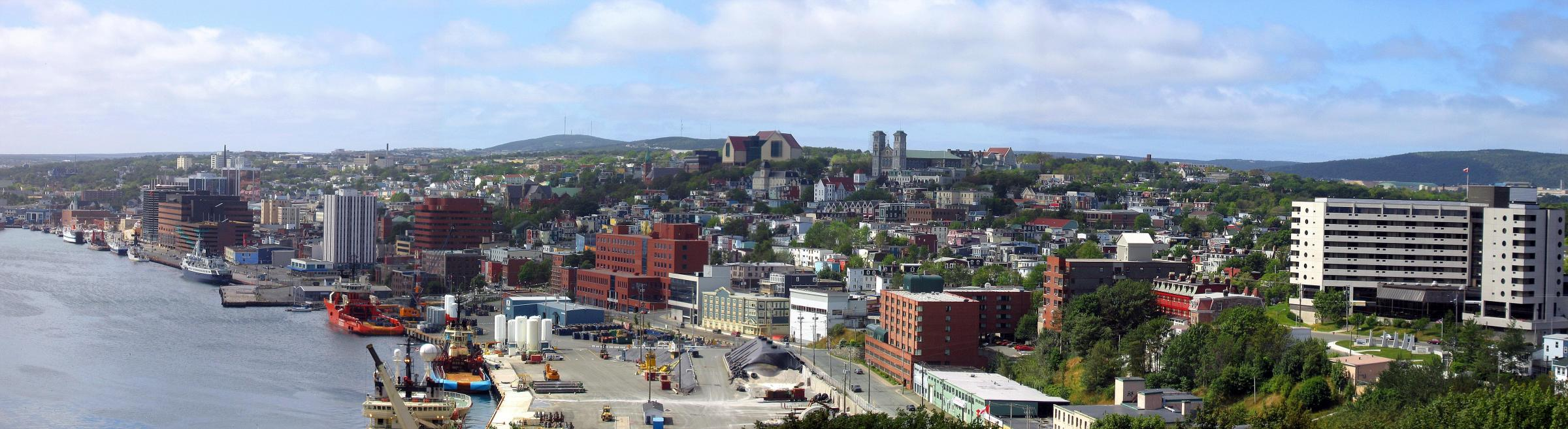
St. John's, Newfoundland and Labrador's capital and largest city

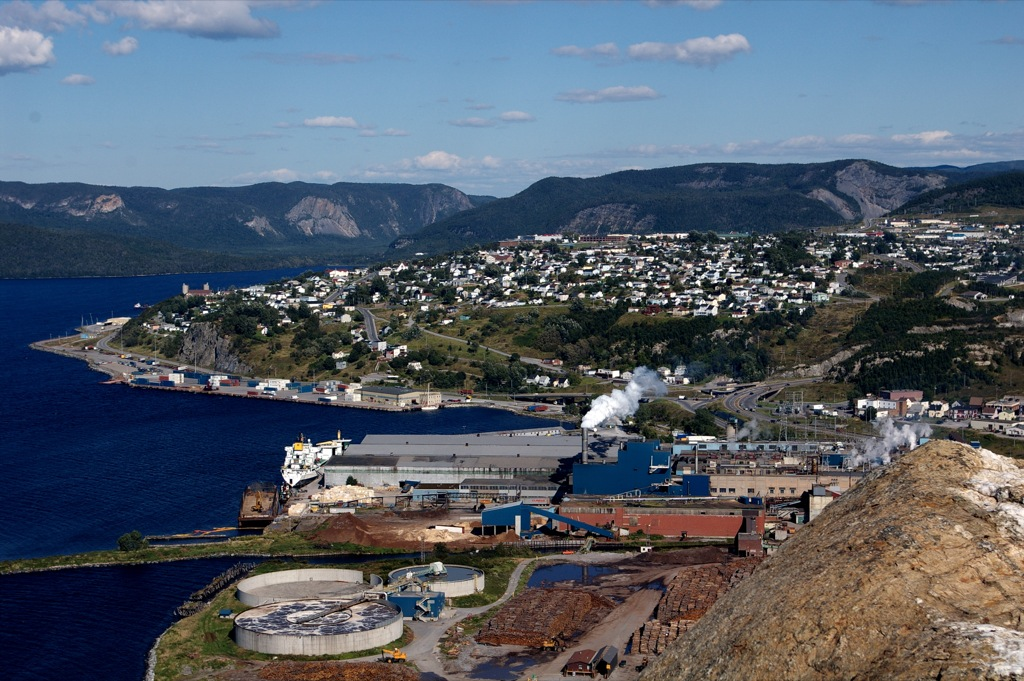
Corner Brook, the province's smallest city

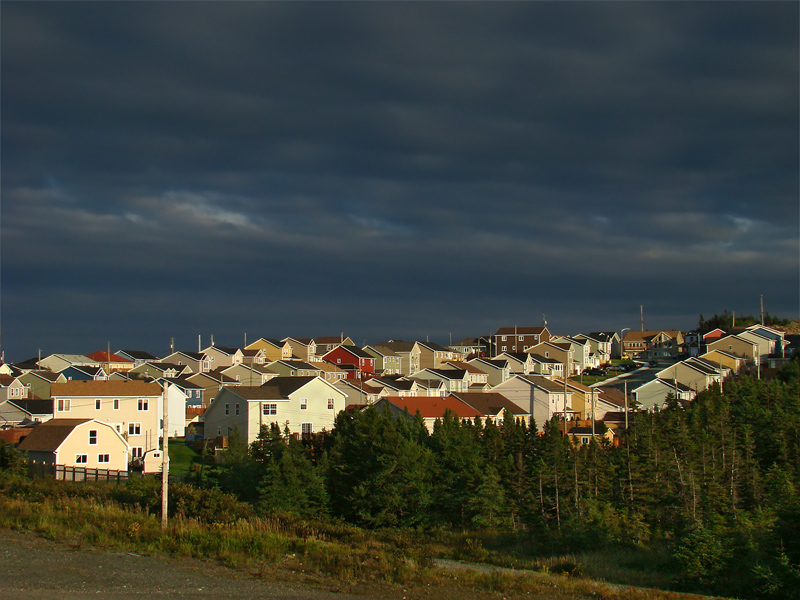
Paradise, a suburb of St. John's

List of municipalities in Newfoundland and Labrador
Name	Municipal type	Region	2021 Census of Population				
Name	Municipal type	Region	Population (2021)	Population (2016)	Change	Land area (km^{2})	Population density (/km^{2})
Corner Brook	City	Newfoundland	19,333	19,806	−2.4%	147.88	130.7
Mount Pearl	City	Newfoundland	22,477	23,120	−2.8%	15.65	1,436.2
St. John's	City	Newfoundland	110,525	108,860	+1.5%	446.02	247.8
Admirals Beach	Town	Newfoundland	97	135	−28.1%	24.20	4.0
Anchor Point	Town	Newfoundland	305	314	−2.9%	2.26	135.0
Appleton	Town	Newfoundland	620	574	+8.0%	6.33	97.9
Aquaforte	Town	Newfoundland	74	80	−7.5%	6.88	10.8
Arnold's Cove	Town	Newfoundland	964	949	+1.6%	5.25	183.6
Avondale	Town	Newfoundland	584	641	−8.9%	29.69	19.7
Badger	Town	Newfoundland	682	704	−3.1%	1.89	360.8
Baie Verte	Town	Newfoundland	1,311	1,313	−0.2%	371.37	3.5
Baine Harbour	Town	Newfoundland	126	124	+1.6%	4.15	30.4
Bauline	Town	Newfoundland	412	452	−8.8%	16.05	25.7
Bay Bulls	Town	Newfoundland	1,566	1,500	+4.4%	30.60	51.2
Bay de Verde	Town	Newfoundland	347	392	−11.5%	13.24	26.2
Bay L'Argent	Town	Newfoundland	234	241	−2.9%	3.74	62.6
Bay Roberts	Town	Newfoundland	5,974	6,012	−0.6%	24.51	243.7
Baytona	Town	Newfoundland	251	262	−4.2%	15.15	16.6
Beachside	Town	Newfoundland	97	132	−26.5%	2.58	37.6
Bellburns	Town	Newfoundland	52	53	−1.9%	8.83	5.9
Belleoram	Town	Newfoundland	348	374	−7.0%	2.20	158.2
Birchy Bay	Town	Newfoundland	511	550	−7.1%	49.33	10.4
Bird Cove	Town	Newfoundland	175	179	−2.2%	7.69	22.8
Bishop's Cove	Town	Newfoundland	252	287	−12.2%	1.90	132.6
Bishop's Falls	Town	Newfoundland	3,082	3,156	−2.3%	26.38	116.8
Bonavista	Town	Newfoundland	3,190	3,448	−7.5%	31.56	101.1
Botwood	Town	Newfoundland	2,778	2,875	−3.4%	14.56	190.8
Branch	Town	Newfoundland	223	228	−2.2%	16.18	13.8
Brent's Cove	Town	Newfoundland	119	157	−24.2%	1.02	116.7
Brighton	Town	Newfoundland	163	188	−13.3%	2.26	72.1
Brigus	Town	Newfoundland	699	723	−3.3%	11.48	60.9
Bryant's Cove	Town	Newfoundland	343	395	−13.2%	4.90	70.0
Buchans	Town	Newfoundland	590	642	−8.1%	4.63	127.4
Burgeo	Town	Newfoundland	1,176	1,307	−10.0%	29.51	39.9
Burin	Town	Newfoundland	2,237	2,315	−3.4%	34.49	64.9
Burlington	Town	Newfoundland	304	314	−3.2%	4.09	74.3
Burnt Islands	Town	Newfoundland	540	622	−13.2%	9.48	57.0
Campbellton	Town	Newfoundland	459	452	+1.5%	35.81	12.8
Cape Broyle	Town	Newfoundland	499	489	+2.0%	10.09	49.5
Cape St. George	Town	Newfoundland	809	853	−5.2%	34.47	23.5
Carbonear	Town	Newfoundland	4,696	4,858	−3.3%	12.44	377.5
Carmanville	Town	Newfoundland	784	740	+5.9%	42.68	18.4
Cartwright	Town	Labrador	439	427	+2.8%	5.87	74.8
Centreville-Wareham-Trinity	Town	Newfoundland	1,116	1,147	−2.7%	37.04	30.1
Chance Cove	Town	Newfoundland	213	256	−16.8%	18.14	11.7
Change Islands	Town	Newfoundland	184	208	−11.5%	5.36	34.3
Channel-Port aux Basques	Town	Newfoundland	3,547	4,067	−12.8%	38.84	91.3
Chapel Arm	Town	Newfoundland	446	457	−2.4%	28.08	15.9
Charlottetown	Town	Labrador	292	290	+0.7%	26.47	11.0
Clarenville	Town	Newfoundland	6,704	6,291	+6.6%	139.91	47.9
Clarke's Beach	Town	Newfoundland	1,400	1,558	−10.1%	12.64	110.8
Coachman's Cove	Town	Newfoundland	111	105	+5.7%	18.99	5.8
Colinet	Town	Newfoundland	103	80	+28.8%	6.01	17.1
Colliers	Town	Newfoundland	613	654	−6.3%	26.24	23.4
Come By Chance	Town	Newfoundland	208	228	−8.8%	39.55	5.3
Comfort Cove-Newstead	Town	Newfoundland	345	407	−15.2%	29.97	11.5
Conception Bay South	Town	Newfoundland	27,168	26,199	+3.7%	59.72	454.9
Conception Harbour	Town	Newfoundland	624	685	−8.9%	21.47	29.1
Conche	Town	Newfoundland	149	170	−12.4%	10.03	14.9
Cook's Harbour	Town	Newfoundland	118	123	−4.1%	1.94	60.8
Cormack	Town	Newfoundland	492	597	−17.6%	133.65	3.7
Cottlesville	Town	Newfoundland	244	271	−10.0%	11.15	21.9
Cow Head	Town	Newfoundland	398	428	−7.0%	17.27	23.0
Cox's Cove	Town	Newfoundland	664	688	−3.5%	7.23	91.8
Crow Head	Town	Newfoundland	156	177	−11.9%	3.03	51.5
Cupids	Town	Newfoundland	699	743	−5.9%	10.86	64.4
Daniel's Harbour	Town	Newfoundland	220	253	−13.0%	7.68	28.6
Deer Lake	Town	Newfoundland	4,864	5,249	−7.3%	73.26	66.4
Dover	Town	Newfoundland	579	662	−12.5%	11.12	52.1
Eastport	Town	Newfoundland	462	501	−7.8%	18.48	25.0
Elliston	Town	Newfoundland	315	308	+2.3%	10.07	31.3
Embree	Town	Newfoundland	679	701	−3.1%	18.35	37.0
Englee	Town	Newfoundland	489	527	−7.2%	28.82	17.0
English Harbour East	Town	Newfoundland	117	139	−15.8%	2.81	41.6
Fermeuse	Town	Newfoundland	266	325	−18.2%	38.33	6.9
Ferryland	Town	Newfoundland	371	414	−10.4%	13.22	28.1
Flatrock	Town	Newfoundland	1,722	1,683	+2.3%	18.10	95.1
Fleur de Lys	Town	Newfoundland	207	244	−15.2%	39.54	5.2
Flower's Cove	Town	Newfoundland	272	270	+0.7%	6.77	40.2
Fogo Island	Town	Newfoundland	2,117	2,244	−5.7%	238.25	8.9
Forteau	Town	Labrador	377	409	−7.8%	7.50	50.3
Fortune	Town	Newfoundland	1,285	1,401	−8.3%	54.77	23.5
Fox Cove-Mortier	Town	Newfoundland	252	295	−14.6%	25.39	9.9
Fox Harbour	Town	Newfoundland	226	252	−10.3%	19.81	11.4
Frenchman's Cove	Town	Newfoundland	159	169	−5.9%	69.07	2.3
Gallants	Town	Newfoundland	50	50	0.0%	6.33	7.9
Gambo	Town	Newfoundland	1,816	1,978	−8.2%	93.03	19.5
Gander	Town	Newfoundland	11,880	11,688	+1.6%	104.53	113.7
Garnish	Town	Newfoundland	542	568	−4.6%	39.10	13.9
Gaskiers-Point La Haye	Town	Newfoundland	189	232	−18.5%	23.29	8.1
Gaultois	Town	Newfoundland	100	136	−26.5%	4.23	23.6
George's Brook-Milton	Town	Newfoundland	719	768	−6.4%	7.60	94.6
Gillams	Town	Newfoundland	429	410	+4.6%	6.72	63.8
Glenburnie-Birchy Head-Shoal Brook	Town	Newfoundland	241	224	+7.6%	6.52	37.0
Glenwood	Town	Newfoundland	739	778	−5.0%	7.08	104.4
Glovertown	Town	Newfoundland	1,948	2,083	−6.5%	69.85	27.9
Goose Cove East	Town	Newfoundland	172	174	−1.1%	2.71	63.5
Grand Bank	Town	Newfoundland	2,152	2,310	−6.8%	16.82	127.9
Grand Falls-Windsor	Town	Newfoundland	13,853	14,171	−2.2%	54.84	252.6
Grand le Pierre	Town	Newfoundland	176	235	−25.1%	142.81	1.2
Greenspond	Town	Newfoundland	257	266	−3.4%	2.75	93.5
Hampden	Town	Newfoundland	439	429	+2.3%	32.99	13.3
Hant's Harbour	Town	Newfoundland	318	329	−3.3%	31.86	10.0
Happy Adventure	Town	Newfoundland	118	200	−41.0%	9.62	12.3
Happy Valley-Goose Bay	Town	Labrador	8,040	8,109	−0.9%	304.52	26.4
Harbour Breton	Town	Newfoundland	1,477	1,634	−9.6%	13.82	106.9
Harbour Grace	Town	Newfoundland	2,796	2,995	−6.6%	33.71	82.9
Harbour Main-Chapel's Cove-Lakeview	Town	Newfoundland	1,065	1,067	−0.2%	21.19	50.3
Hare Bay	Town	Newfoundland	925	969	−4.5%	34.11	27.1
Hawke's Bay	Town	Newfoundland	297	315	−5.7%	46.41	6.4
Heart's Content	Town	Newfoundland	330	340	−2.9%	62.87	5.2
Heart's Delight-Islington	Town	Newfoundland	646	674	−4.2%	26.95	24.0
Heart's Desire	Town	Newfoundland	184	213	−13.6%	17.02	10.8
Hermitage-Sandyville	Town	Newfoundland	404	422	−4.3%	29.14	13.9
Holyrood	Town	Newfoundland	2,471	2,463	+0.3%	126.02	19.6
Howley	Town	Newfoundland	179	205	−12.7%	19.91	9.0
Hughes Brook	Town	Newfoundland	236	255	−7.5%	1.56	151.3
Humber Arm South	Town	Newfoundland	1,537	1,599	−3.9%	65.14	23.6
Indian Bay	Town	Newfoundland	172	175	−1.7%	86.49	2.0
Irishtown-Summerside	Town	Newfoundland	1,260	1,418	−11.1%	11.88	106.1
Isle aux Morts	Town	Newfoundland	559	664	−15.8%	7.75	72.1
Jackson's Arm	Town	Newfoundland	277	284	−2.5%	7.07	39.2
Keels	Town	Newfoundland	46	51	−9.8%	6.67	6.9
King's Cove	Town	Newfoundland	75	90	−16.7%	21.44	3.5
King's Point	Town	Newfoundland	653	659	−0.9%	45.72	14.3
Kippens	Town	Newfoundland	1,842	2,008	−8.3%	14.24	129.4
Labrador City	Town	Labrador	7,412	7,220	+2.7%	34.11	217.3
Lamaline	Town	Newfoundland	218	267	−18.4%	79.75	2.7
L'Anse-au-Clair	Town	Labrador	219	216	+1.4%	60.65	3.6
L'Anse-au-Loup	Town	Labrador	692	558	+24.0%	3.39	204.1
Lark Harbour	Town	Newfoundland	508	522	−2.7%	12.94	39.3
LaScie	Town	Newfoundland	820	872	−6.0%	29.16	28.1
Lawn	Town	Newfoundland	583	624	−6.6%	3.52	165.6
Leading Tickles	Town	Newfoundland	296	292	+1.4%	26.59	11.1
Lewin's Cove	Town	Newfoundland	546	544	+0.4%	6.33	86.3
Lewisporte	Town	Newfoundland	3,288	3,409	−3.5%	36.02	91.3
Little Bay	Town	Newfoundland	100	105	−4.8%	1.66	60.2
Little Bay East	Town	Newfoundland	84	127	−33.9%	1.56	53.8
Little Burnt Bay	Town	Newfoundland	238	281	−15.3%	8.46	28.1
Logy Bay-Middle Cove-Outer Cove	Town	Newfoundland	2,364	2,221	+6.4%	16.99	139.1
Long Harbour-Mount Arlington Heights	Town	Newfoundland	233	250	−6.8%	18.33	12.7
Lord's Cove	Town	Newfoundland	155	162	−4.3%	29.91	5.2
Lourdes	Town	Newfoundland	502	465	+8.0%	7.39	67.9
Lumsden	Town	Newfoundland	535	501	+6.8%	19.20	27.9
Lushes Bight-Beaumont-Beaumont North	Town	Newfoundland	169	168	+0.6%	34.52	4.9
Main Brook	Town	Newfoundland	246	243	+1.2%	28.00	8.8
Mary's Harbour	Town	Labrador	312	341	−8.5%	34.25	9.1
Marystown	Town	Newfoundland	5,204	5,316	−2.1%	62.23	83.6
Massey Drive	Town	Newfoundland	1,606	1,632	−1.6%	2.45	655.5
McIvers	Town	Newfoundland	513	538	−4.6%	11.97	42.9
Meadows	Town	Newfoundland	560	626	−10.5%	3.82	146.6
Middle Arm	Town	Newfoundland	443	474	−6.5%	24.93	17.8
Miles Cove	Town	Newfoundland	97	104	−6.7%	3.98	24.4
Millertown	Town	Newfoundland	87	81	+7.4%	3.08	28.2
Milltown-Head of Bay d'Espoir	Town	Newfoundland	669	749	−10.7%	24.95	26.8
Ming's Bight	Town	Newfoundland	298	319	−6.6%	3.81	78.2
Morrisville	Town	Newfoundland	93	101	−7.9%	14.09	6.6
Mount Carmel-Mitchells Brook-St. Catherines	Town	Newfoundland	382	349	+9.5%	60.76	6.3
Mount Moriah	Town	Newfoundland	700	746	−6.2%	15.71	44.6
Musgrave Harbour	Town	Newfoundland	946	990	−4.4%	67.30	14.1
Musgravetown	Town	Newfoundland	561	564	−0.5%	13.49	41.6
New Perlican	Town	Newfoundland	200	186	+7.5%	24.45	8.2
New-Wes-Valley	Town	Newfoundland	2,044	2,172	−5.9%	132.70	15.4
Nipper's Harbour	Town	Newfoundland	74	85	−12.9%	1.93	38.3
Norman's Cove-Long Cove	Town	Newfoundland	647	666	−2.9%	20.15	32.1
Norris Arm	Town	Newfoundland	708	737	−3.9%	41.35	17.1
Norris Point	Town	Newfoundland	602	670	−10.1%	4.84	124.4
North River	Town	Newfoundland	579	570	+1.6%	4.2	137.9
North West River	Town	Labrador	560	547	+2.4%	3.55	157.7
Northern Arm	Town	Newfoundland	371	426	−12.9%	24.94	14.9
Old Perlican	Town	Newfoundland	608	633	−3.9%	14.14	43.0
Pacquet	Town	Newfoundland	145	164	−11.6%	14.44	10.0
Paradise	Town	Newfoundland	22,957	21,389	+7.3%	29.67	773.7
Parkers Cove	Town	Newfoundland	233	248	−6.0%	4.77	48.8
Parson's Pond	Town	Newfoundland	368	345	+6.7%	12.34	29.8
Pasadena	Town	Newfoundland	3,524	3,620	−2.7%	49.17	71.7
Peterview	Town	Newfoundland	723	828	−12.7%	6.34	114.0
Petty Harbour-Maddox Cove	Town	Newfoundland	947	960	−1.4%	4.40	215.2
Pilley's Island	Town	Newfoundland	286	294	−2.7%	34.65	8.3
Pinware	Town	Labrador	64	88	−27.3%	4.08	15.7
Placentia	Town	Newfoundland	3,289	3,496	−5.9%	57.80	56.9
Point au Gaul	Town	Newfoundland	67	88	−23.9%	3.89	17.2
Point Lance	Town	Newfoundland	87	102	−14.7%	28.29	3.1
Point Leamington	Town	Newfoundland	574	591	−2.9%	26.80	21.4
Point May	Town	Newfoundland	254	231	+10.0%	63.25	4.0
Point of Bay	Town	Newfoundland	137	154	−11.0%	21.62	6.3
Pool's Cove	Town	Newfoundland	188	193	−2.6%	2.65	70.9
Port Anson	Town	Newfoundland	110	130	−15.4%	7.72	14.2
Port au Choix	Town	Newfoundland	742	789	−6.0%	35.56	20.9
Port au Port East	Town	Newfoundland	542	579	−6.4%	25.06	21.6
Port au Port West-Aguathuna-Felix Cove	Town	Newfoundland	420	449	−6.5%	16.97	24.7
Port Blandford	Town	Newfoundland	513	488	+5.1%	51.00	10.1
Port Hope Simpson	Town	Labrador	403	412	−2.2%	32.02	12.6
Port Kirwan	Town	Newfoundland	49	52	−5.8%	8.84	5.5
Port Rexton	Town	Newfoundland	361	340	+6.2%	11.64	31.0
Port Saunders	Town	Newfoundland	678	674	+0.6%	38.50	17.6
Portugal Cove South	Town	Newfoundland	101	150	−32.7%	1.08	93.5
Portugal Cove–St. Philip's	Town	Newfoundland	8,415	8,147	+3.3%	57.61	146.1
Pouch Cove	Town	Newfoundland	2,063	2,069	−0.3%	58.24	35.4
Raleigh	Town	Newfoundland	150	177	−15.3%	11.27	13.3
Ramea	Town	Newfoundland	388	447	−13.2%	1.86	208.6
Red Bay	Town	Labrador	142	169	−16.0%	2.31	61.5
Red Harbour	Town	Newfoundland	177	189	−6.3%	11.19	15.8
Reidville	Town	Newfoundland	550	509	+8.1%	58.28	9.4
Rencontre East	Town	Newfoundland	115	139	−17.3%	2.56	44.9
Renews-Cappahayden	Town	Newfoundland	280	301	−7.0%	125.93	2.2
River of Ponds	Town	Newfoundland	219	215	+1.9%	4.46	49.1
Riverhead	Town	Newfoundland	165	185	−10.8%	101.84	1.6
Robert's Arm	Town	Newfoundland	722	805	−10.3%	36.09	20.0
Rocky Harbour	Town	Newfoundland	937	947	−1.1%	12.08	77.6
Roddickton-Bide Arm	Town	Newfoundland	928	999	−7.1%	45.14	20.6
Rose Blanche-Harbour le Cou	Town	Newfoundland	344	394	−12.7%	4.49	76.6
Rushoon	Town	Newfoundland	229	245	−6.5%	5.89	38.9
Salmon Cove	Town	Newfoundland	764	680	+12.4%	4.21	181.5
Salvage	Town	Newfoundland	108	124	−12.9%	15.85	6.8
Sandringham	Town	Newfoundland	205	229	−10.5%	9.57	21.4
Sandy Cove	Town	Newfoundland	120	122	−1.6%	8.99	13.3
Seal Cove (Fortune Bay)	Town	Newfoundland	215	242	−11.2%	2.03	105.9
Seal Cove (White Bay)	Town	Newfoundland	281	303	−7.3%	10.79	26.0
Small Point-Adam's Cove-Blackhead-Broad Cove	Town	Newfoundland	414	387	+7.0%	23.12	17.9
South Brook	Town	Newfoundland	420	482	−12.9%	8.72	48.2
South River	Town	Newfoundland	674	647	+4.2%	5.97	112.9
Southern Harbour	Town	Newfoundland	313	395	−20.8%	5.39	58.1
Spaniard's Bay	Town	Newfoundland	2,630	2,653	−0.9%	66.09	39.8
Springdale	Town	Newfoundland	2,897	2,971	−2.5%	17.46	165.9
St. Alban's	Town	Newfoundland	1,189	1,186	+0.3%	20.48	58.1
St. Anthony	Town	Newfoundland	2,180	2,258	−3.5%	37.46	58.2
St. Bernard's-Jacques Fontaine	Town	Newfoundland	433	433	0.0%	16.08	26.9
St. Brendan's	Town	Newfoundland	125	145	−13.8%	9.76	12.8
St. Bride's	Town	Newfoundland	272	252	+7.9%	5.38	50.6
St. George's	Town	Newfoundland	1,139	1,203	−5.3%	25.71	44.3
St. Jacques-Coomb's Cove	Town	Newfoundland	546	588	−7.1%	81.89	6.7
St. Joseph's	Town	Newfoundland	86	115	−25.2%	29.22	2.9
St. Lawrence	Town	Newfoundland	1,115	1,192	−6.5%	34.86	32.0
St. Lewis	Town	Labrador	181	194	−6.7%	10.04	18.0
St. Lunaire-Griquet	Town	Newfoundland	603	604	−0.2%	17.29	34.9
St. Mary's	Town	Newfoundland	313	347	−9.8%	36.41	8.6
St. Pauls	Town	Newfoundland	202	238	−15.1%	6.34	31.9
St. Shott's	Town	Newfoundland	55	66	−16.7%	1.07	51.4
St. Vincent's-St. Stephen's-Peter's River	Town	Newfoundland	263	313	−16.0%	86.62	3.0
Steady Brook	Town	Newfoundland	416	444	−6.3%	1.24	335.5
Stephenville	Town	Newfoundland	6,540	6,623	−1.3%	35.27	185.4
Stephenville Crossing	Town	Newfoundland	1,634	1,719	−4.9%	31.07	52.6
Summerford	Town	Newfoundland	805	906	−11.1%	16.04	50.2
Sunnyside	Town	Newfoundland	407	396	+2.8%	39.02	10.4
Terra Nova	Town	Newfoundland	99	73	+35.6%	2.44	40.6
Terrenceville	Town	Newfoundland	446	482	−7.5%	15.12	29.5
Torbay	Town	Newfoundland	7,852	7,899	−0.6%	34.89	225.1
Traytown	Town	Newfoundland	279	267	+4.5%	13.30	21.0
Trepassey	Town	Newfoundland	405	481	−15.8%	54.21	7.5
Trinity	Town	Newfoundland	182	169	+7.7%	12.92	14.1
Trinity Bay North	Town	Newfoundland	1,649	1,819	−9.3%	26.19	63.0
Triton	Town	Newfoundland	896	983	−8.9%	7.54	118.8
Trout River	Town	Newfoundland	508	552	−8.0%	5.83	87.1
Twillingate	Town	Newfoundland	2,121	2,196	−3.4%	25.60	82.9
Upper Island Cove	Town	Newfoundland	1,401	1,561	−10.2%	7.82	179.2
Victoria	Town	Newfoundland	1,658	1,800	−7.9%	17.96	92.3
Wabana	Town	Newfoundland	1,815	2,146	−15.4%	14.49	125.3
Wabush	Town	Labrador	1,964	1,906	+3.0%	42.42	46.3
West St. Modeste	Town	Labrador	102	111	−8.1%	7.60	13.4
Westport	Town	Newfoundland	185	195	−5.1%	5.23	35.4
Whitbourne	Town	Newfoundland	955	890	+7.3%	21.51	44.4
Whiteway	Town	Newfoundland	351	373	−5.9%	22.53	15.6
Winterland	Town	Newfoundland	398	390	+2.1%	54.44	7.3
Winterton	Town	Newfoundland	436	450	−3.1%	10.61	41.1
Witless Bay	Town	Newfoundland	1,640	1,619	+1.3%	17.61	93.1
Woodstock	Town	Newfoundland	195	190	+2.6%	10.05	19.4
Woody Point, Bonne Bay	Town	Newfoundland	244	282	−13.5%	3.78	64.6
York Harbour	Town	Newfoundland	372	344	+8.1%	13.88	26.8
Hopedale	Inuit community government	Labrador	596	574	+3.8%	2.18	273.4
Makkovik	Inuit community government	Labrador	365	377	−3.2%	2.95	123.7
Nain	Inuit community government	Labrador	1,204	1,125	+7.0%	93.50	12.9
Postville	Inuit community government	Labrador	188	177	+6.2%	2.39	78.7
Rigolet	Inuit community government	Labrador	327	305	+7.2%	5.27	62.0
Sub-total cities			152,335	151,786	+0.4%	609.55	249.9
Sub-total towns			306,106	312,161	−1.9%	7,422.78	41.2
Sub-total Inuit community governments			2,680	2,558	+4.8%	106.29	21.9
Total municipalities			461,121	466,505	−1.2%	8,148.66	56.7
Province of Newfoundland and Labrador			510,550	519,716	−1.8%	358,170.37	1.4

== See also ==
- List of census agglomerations in Atlantic Canada
- List of communities in Newfoundland and Labrador
- List of designated places in Newfoundland and Labrador
- List of population centres in Newfoundland and Labrador
- List of unorganized subdivisions in Newfoundland and Labrador
