= Newfoundland and Labrador Route 211 =

Highway in Newfoundland and Labrador

Route 211
- English Harbour East Road

Route information
- Maintained by Newfoundland and Labrador Department of Transportation and Infrastructure
- Length: 32.9 km (20.4 mi)

Major junctions
- West end: English Harbour East
- East end: Route 210 near Terrenceville

Location
- Country: Canada
- Province: Newfoundland and Labrador

Highway system
- Highways in Newfoundland and Labrador
| ← Route 210 | → Route 212 |

Route 211, also known as English Harbour East Road, is a 32.9-kilometre-long (20.4 mi) east–west highway on the Burin Peninsula of the island of Newfoundland in the province of Newfoundland and Labrador. It connects the communities of English Harbour East, Grand le Pierre, and Terrenceville with Route 210 (Heritage Run/Burin Peninsula Highway).

== Route description ==
Route 211 begins at a fork in the road it the centre of town in English Harbour East. It winds its way northwest through neighbourhoods before leaving town and heading northeast through rural and barren terrain for several kilometres. The highway makes a dip to the south to pass through Grand Le Pierre before heading inland for several more kilometres. Route 211 now passes just north of Terrenceville, where it has an intersection with Main Drive, which provides access to the town. Route 211 comes to an end shortly thereafter at an intersection with Route 210.

== Major intersections ==
| Location | km | mi | Destinations | Notes |
|---|---|---|---|---|
| English Harbour East | 0.0 | 0.0 | Fork in the road near downtown | Western terminus |
| | 29.5 | 18.3 | Main Road - Terrenceville | Unnumbered local road |
| | 32.9 | 20.4 | Route 210 (Burin Peninsula Highway/Heritage Run) – Swift Current, Marystown, Grand Bank | Eastern terminus |
1.000 mi = 1.609 km; 1.000 km = 0.621 mi
