= Grand Beach =

Grand Beach may refer to:

- Grand Beach, Newfoundland and Labrador, a small town in Canada
- Grand Beach (Manitoba), Canada
- Grand Beach Provincial Park, Manitoba, Canada
- Grand Beach, Michigan, United States
