= Rock Harbour, Newfoundland and Labrador =

Rock Harbour
- Local service district / designated place
- Location within Newfoundland and Labrador
- Coordinates: 47°11′N 55°03′W
- Country: Canada
- Province: Newfoundland and Labrador

Population
  - Total: 61

Rock Harbour is a local service district and designated place in the Canadian province of Newfoundland and Labrador. It is east of Marystown on Placentia Bay.

== History ==
Rock Harbour had a population of 149 with 40 households in 1921 and 142 in 1956. The population as of the 2011 Canada census was 66.

== Geography ==
Rock Harbour is in Newfoundland within Subdivision D of Division No. 2.

== Demographics ==
As a designated place in the 2016 Census of Population conducted by Statistics Canada, Rock Harbour recorded a population of 54 living in 24 of its 35 total private dwellings, a change of −18.2% from its 2011 population of 66. The population is around 43 as of 2023. With a land area of 7.36 km^{2} (2.84 sq mi), it had a population density of 7.3/km^{2} (19.0/sq mi) in 2016.

== Economy ==
A major employer at one point was a nearby fish processing plant operated by FPI then OCI (closed as of 2011) in Marystown and at the Peter Kiewit and Sons Marystown and Cow Head Facilities, but most of the population rely on work elsewhere in the province and country working as skilled tradespersons.

== Government ==
Rock Harbour is a local service district (LSD) that is governed by a committee responsible for the provision of certain services to the community. The chair of the LSD committee is Clyde Hooper.

== See also ==
- List of communities in Newfoundland and Labrador
- List of designated places in Newfoundland and Labrador
- List of local service districts in Newfoundland and Labrador
