= Jean de Baie =

Place in Canada

Coordinates: 47°14′N 55°03′W

Jean de Baie is a local service district and designated place in the Canadian province of Newfoundland and Labrador. It is near Marystown.

== History ==
The first post office was established in 1965 and the first postmistress was Mrs. Mary O'Keefe.

== Geography ==
Jean de Baie is in Newfoundland within Subdivision C of Division No. 2.

== Demographics ==
As a designated place in the 2016 Census of Population conducted by Statistics Canada, Jean de Baie recorded a population of 171 living in 70 of its 74 total private dwellings, a change of -1.2% from its 2011 population of 173. With a land area of 1.96 km^{2} (0.76 sq mi), it had a population density of 87.2/km^{2} (226.0/sq mi) in 2016.

== Government ==
Jean de Baie is a local service district (LSD) that is governed by a committee responsible for the provision of certain services to the community. The chair of the LSD committee is Wayne Rogers.

== See also ==
- List of communities in Newfoundland and Labrador
- List of designated places in Newfoundland and Labrador
- List of local service districts in Newfoundland and Labrador
