= Garden Cove, Newfoundland and Labrador =

Village in Newfoundland and Labrador, Canada

Coordinates: 47.853°N 54.158°W

Garden Cove is a local service district and designated place in the Canadian province of Newfoundland and Labrador. It is southeast of Swift Current. The residents of Sound Island moved without government assistance during a period around 1953. They moved to the mainland into Garden Cove and surrounding communities. Today Garden Cove has an active close community. There is a tour boat, Merasheen which is part of the Woody Island Resort hotel which gives people a Newfoundland outport experience. Garden Cove has hiking trails passing by Big Rock Hill and Placentiamans Point. There is an inshore fishery operating there. Some species caught are lobster, cod, mackerel, herring, crab, scallops, mussels, flounder and trout. Late in summer tuna chase bill fish just off shore.

Pods of fish called locally pothead whales can be watched from shore. The harbour authority is run by the government using volunteers. Boats can be launched and docked there. Fresh water is available at the dock. The summer offers sheltered boating.

== Geography ==
Garden Cove is in Newfoundland within Subdivision K of Division No. 2.

== Demographics ==
As a designated place in the 2016 Census of Population conducted by Statistics Canada, Garden Cove recorded a population of 71 living in 32 of its 45 total private dwellings, a change of -17.4% from its 2011 population of 86. With a land area of 5.28 km^{2} (2.04 sq mi), it had a population density of 13.4/km^{2} (34.8/sq mi) in 2016.

== Government ==
Garden Cove is a local service district (LSD) that is governed by a committee responsible for the provision of certain services to the community. The chair of the LSD committee is Chriss Maye.

== See also ==
- List of communities in Newfoundland and Labrador
- List of designated places in Newfoundland and Labrador
- List of local service districts in Newfoundland and Labrador
