= Mortier Bay =

Natural bay in Newfoundland and Labrador, Canada

Coordinates: 47.083°N 55.098°W

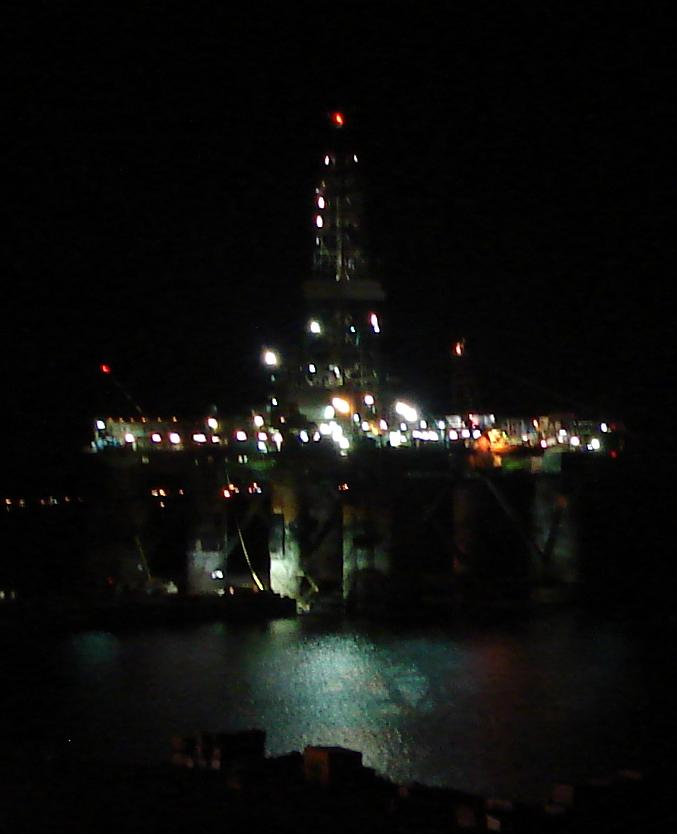
Oil platform in Mortier Bay, Marystown, Newfoundland.

Mortier Bay (or Little Mortier Bay) is a natural bay on the Burin Peninsula on the south coast of the island of Newfoundland in the province of Newfoundland and Labrador, Canada. It is entered through a channel 1.5 miles (2.4 km) long and 0.5 miles (0.80 km)wide, at the north end of which the bay opens nearly 2 miles (3.2 km) in diameter with deep water and no anchorage, except in the harbors off it. The settlement of Marystown is located on the bay.
