= Goose Cove, Placentia Bay, Newfoundland and Labrador =

Settlement in Newfoundland and Labrador

Coordinates: 47.8602778°N 54.1027778°W

Location of Goose Cove in Newfoundland and Labrador

Goose Cove is a settlement in the Canadian province of Newfoundland and Labrador. It is located on the shore of Placentia Bay, right next to the settlement of North Harbour.
