= Thomas Hynes (fisherman) =

Newfoundland Fisherman, Protester and Fugitive

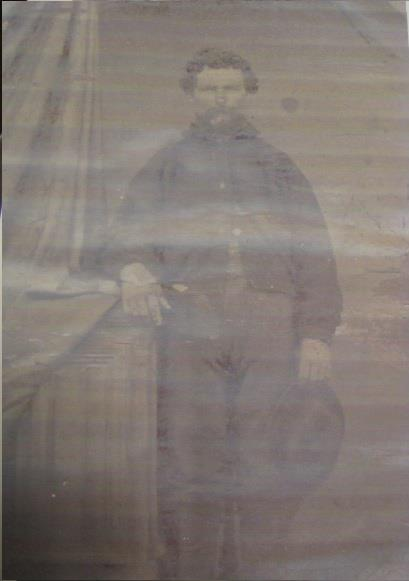
- Thomas Hynes, 1891 photo
- Born: circa 1831; English Harbour East, Newfoundland Colony
- Died: 7 December 1908; On board the S.S. Virginia Lake at Burin, Dominion of Newfoundland
- Occupations: Fisherman, Sailor, Protester
- Spouse: Rebecca Pittman
- Children: 8
- Parent(s): Thomas Hynes and Elizabeth Saunders

Thomas Hynes (circa 1831 - 1908) was a Newfoundland fisherman, protester and fugitive who came to prominence in his defiance of the Newfoundland Bait Acts. Upon his death, Hynes was described as "well known" and the "most industrious man."

== Biography ==
Hynes was born in the tiny Newfoundland town of English Harbour East in Fortune Bay circa 1831 to Thomas Hynes and Elizabeth Saunders.

On 2 February 1867, he was married to Rebecca Pittman at Oderin. Sometime after the family moved to Bay L'Argent, Fortune Bay, where he lived the remainder of his life. He owned the ships 'Victory' built in 1879 and 'Rising Sun' built in 1888.

== Defiance of the Bait Act ==
In 1891, Hynes rose to prominence in Newfoundland when he was a ringleader in the defiance of the ill-fated Newfoundland Bait Act. These were laws passed in Newfoundland to try to control the sale of bait to French fishermen, and later to Canadian and American fishermen. These laws ultimately were detrimental to Newfoundland fishermen and their families as they were unable to sell their bait to these groups. This led to mass poverty of the families of inshore fishermen In the spring of 1891, militarized government ships with several constables blocked the entrance to Fortune Bay and St. Pierre preventing the fishermen to set sail and sell their bait to foreign entities. Despite this dangerous illegal move, local vessels ring led by Thomas Hynes "ran the blockade" and pushed past the authorities. At the height of the movement in April 1891, 130 schooners with their fish loaded and ready for sale, defied the blockade.

In the midst of the chaos that was ensuing in Fortune Bay, constables aboard the S.S. Fiona, manned by Captain James Francis McGrath, patrolled the bay looking for ring leader Thomas Hynes. Hynes was a skilled escape artist who "always managed to outwit" the policemen and after one particular run-in with them in Bay L'Argent he was assisted by his neighbour John House who reportedly fought nine policemen while Hynes "calmly" watched from his hiding spot in the forest.

Finally in late April 1891, after successfully "running the blockade" past the authorities and returning to St. Jacques, Fortune Bay, prominent merchant Denis Burke convinced eight fishermen namely John Pittman, M. Roper, William Hartigan, George Pope, John Vallis, Jerry Petite Jr., Daniel McCarthy and lastly ring leader Thomas Hynes to turn themselves in. Together they were taken by the S.S. Conscript to St. John's for arraignment. Meanwhile, rumours amongst the population of St. John's, the capital city of Newfoundland, began to persist that the fishermen of Fortune Bay were being beaten and ill-treated by law enforcement over their defiance of the bait act. This caused significant unrest and protest to happen in the city and as the trial wore on in May 1891, pressure began to mount on the Government of Newfoundland to release the prisoners. Eventually, seven were found not guilty with only Hynes and another man named William Stewart, who was not captured, being found guilty and released on bail. Soon after, the Bait Act enforcement began to unravel due to the public pressure and support of Hynes and the other fishermen.

== Death ==
Hynes, a fisherman by trade, died while working in his occupation on board the same ship that captured him 17 years prior, the S.S. Virginia Lake (formerly the S.S. Conscript), in Burin, Newfoundland.

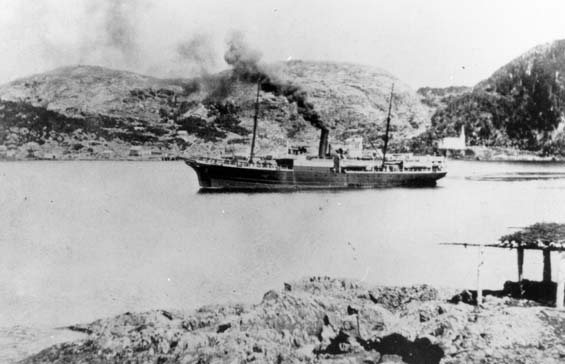
S.S. Virginia Lake (previously S.S. Conscript) between 1888 and 1909
