= Black River, Newfoundland and Labrador =

Locality in Newfoundland and Labrador, Canada

Coordinates: 47.879°N 54.167°W

Location of Black River in Newfoundland and Labrador

Black River is a locality in the Canadian province of Newfoundland and Labrador. It is periodically reported in the census - usually with a few dozen residents - though it is usually included in with a nearby settlement (Garden Cove).
