= Red Harbour =

Coordinates: 47°17′34″N 54°59′50″W

- Town
- Interactive map of Red Harbour
- Country: Canada
- Province: Newfoundland and Labrador
- Settled: 1800s
- Incorporated: 1969

Population (2021)
  - Total: 177
- Time zone: UTC-3:30 (Newfoundland Time)
  - Summer (DST): UTC-2:30 (Newfoundland Daylight)
- Area code: 709
- Highways: Route 210
- Website: Town of Red Harbour; Official Website

Red Harbour is a Canadian municipality of Newfoundland and Labrador. It is located 20 kilometres northeast of Marystown.

== Settlement ==
Red Harbour was inhabited from the early 19th century until the early 1960s when the half dozen families living there abandoned the community under the resettlement program.

The present town was created when residents from Port Elizabeth (in the Flat Islands) convinced the provincial government to relocate them to Red Harbour during the resettlement program in the late 1960s. Red Harbour is primarily a fishing community. Species fished are lobster, snowcrab, lumproe, and cod. The town has modern harbour facilities constructed in 1997.

== Town council ==
The town council consists of:

- Mayor: Cory Miller
- Councilors: Wallace Rowe, Fred Kenway and Jamie Grondin.

Janelle Slaney is the current Town Clerk. Kevin Paddle served as Town Clerk/Manager from 2003 to 2019.

The position was previously held by Trudy Bennett (1997–2003) and prior to Ms. Bennett by Walter Kenway who served as Town Clerk for many years. Mr. Kenway was also Mayor of Red Harbour for several years and was one of the community leaders responsible for creating the community in 1969.

== Demographics ==
In the 2021 Census of Population conducted by Statistics Canada, Red Harbour had a population of 177 living in 76 of its 82 total private dwellings, a change of −6.3% from its 2016 population of 189. With a land area of 11.19 km^{2} (4.32 sq mi), it had a population density of 15.8/km^{2} (41.0/sq mi) in 2021.

== See also ==
- Burin Peninsula
- List of cities and towns in Newfoundland and Labrador
- Marystown
