= Baine Harbour =

Community in Canada

- Town
- Location of Baine Harbour in Newfoundland
- Coordinates: 47°22′00″N 54°55′00″W
- Country: Canada
- Province: Newfoundland and Labrador
- Incorporated: 1970

Government
  - Mayor: William Kenway

Area
  - Land: 4.15 km^{2} (1.60 sq mi)

Population (2021)
  - Total: 126
  - Density: 25.7/km^{2} (67/sq mi)
- Time zone: UTC-3:30 (Newfoundland Time)
  - Summer (DST): UTC-2:30 (Newfoundland Daylight)
- Area code: 709
- Highways: Route 210

Baine Harbour is a Canadian community in the province of Newfoundland and Labrador northeast of Marystown.

== History ==
In 1911 it had one store, one church and one hotel. The way office was established in 1883. The first way master was Lemuel Roberts. The first postmaster was W. Rodway in 1949. It was incorporated as a "government community" in 1970.

== Demographics ==
In the 2021 Census of Population conducted by Statistics Canada, Baine Harbour had a population of 126 living in 59 of its 69 total private dwellings, a change of 1.6% from its 2016 population of 124. With a land area of 4.15 km^{2} (1.60 sq mi), it had a population density of 30.4/km^{2} (78.6/sq mi) in 2021.

== See also ==
- List of cities and towns in Newfoundland and Labrador
