= Whiteway, Newfoundland and Labrador =

Whiteway
- Town
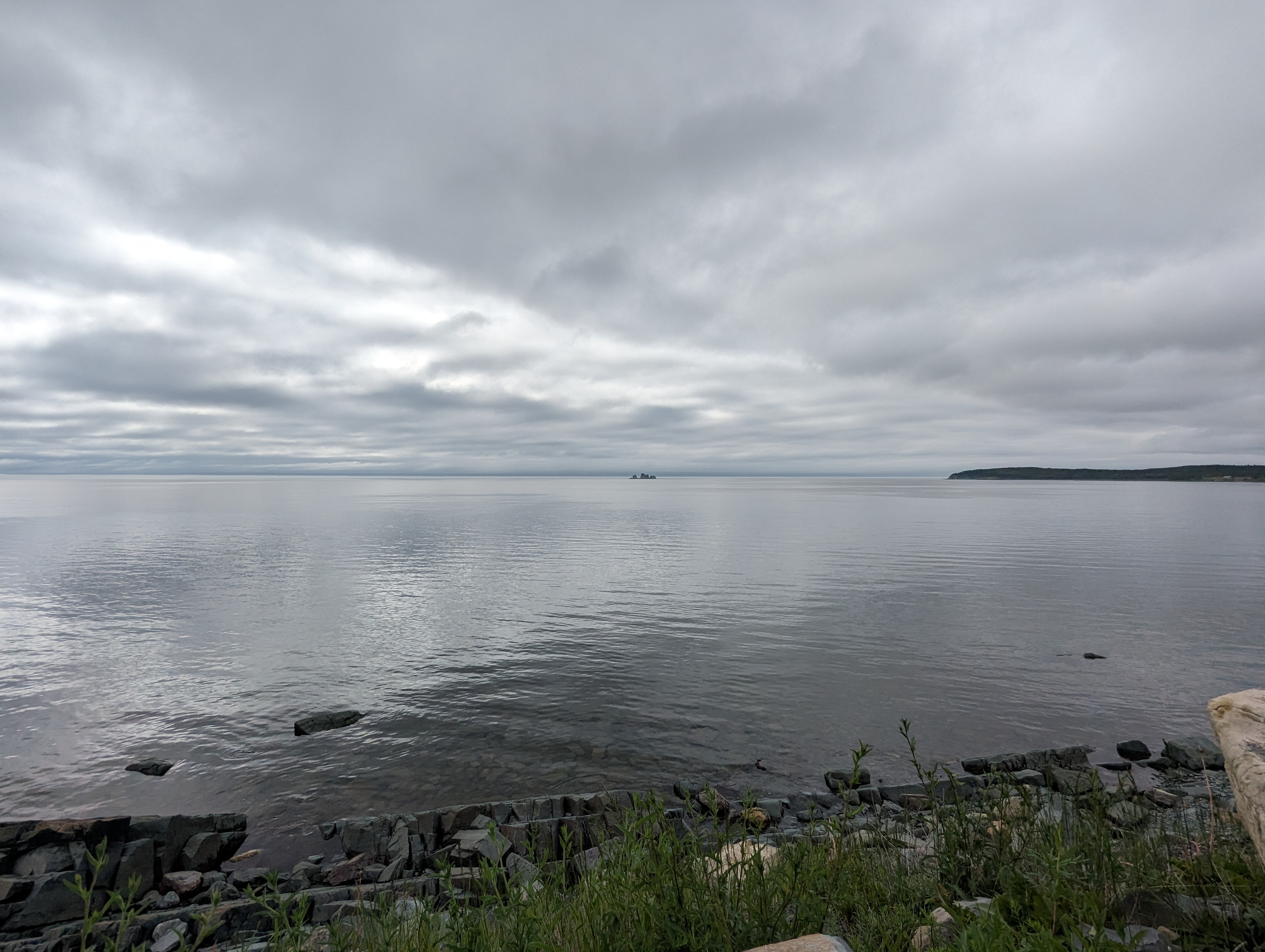
- Witless Bay in 2023
- Interactive map of Whiteway
- Coordinates: 47°40′59″N 53°27′04″W
- Country: Canada
- Province: Newfoundland and Labrador

Area
  - Total: 22.53 km^{2} (8.70 sq mi)

Population (2021)
  - Total: 351
  - Density: 15.6/km^{2} (40/sq mi)
- Time zone: UTC-3:30 (Newfoundland Time)
  - Summer (DST): UTC-2:30 (Newfoundland Daylight)
- Area code: 709
- Highways: Route 80

Whiteway is a town in the Canadian province of Newfoundland and Labrador. The town had a population of 351 in the Canada 2021 Census.

== History ==
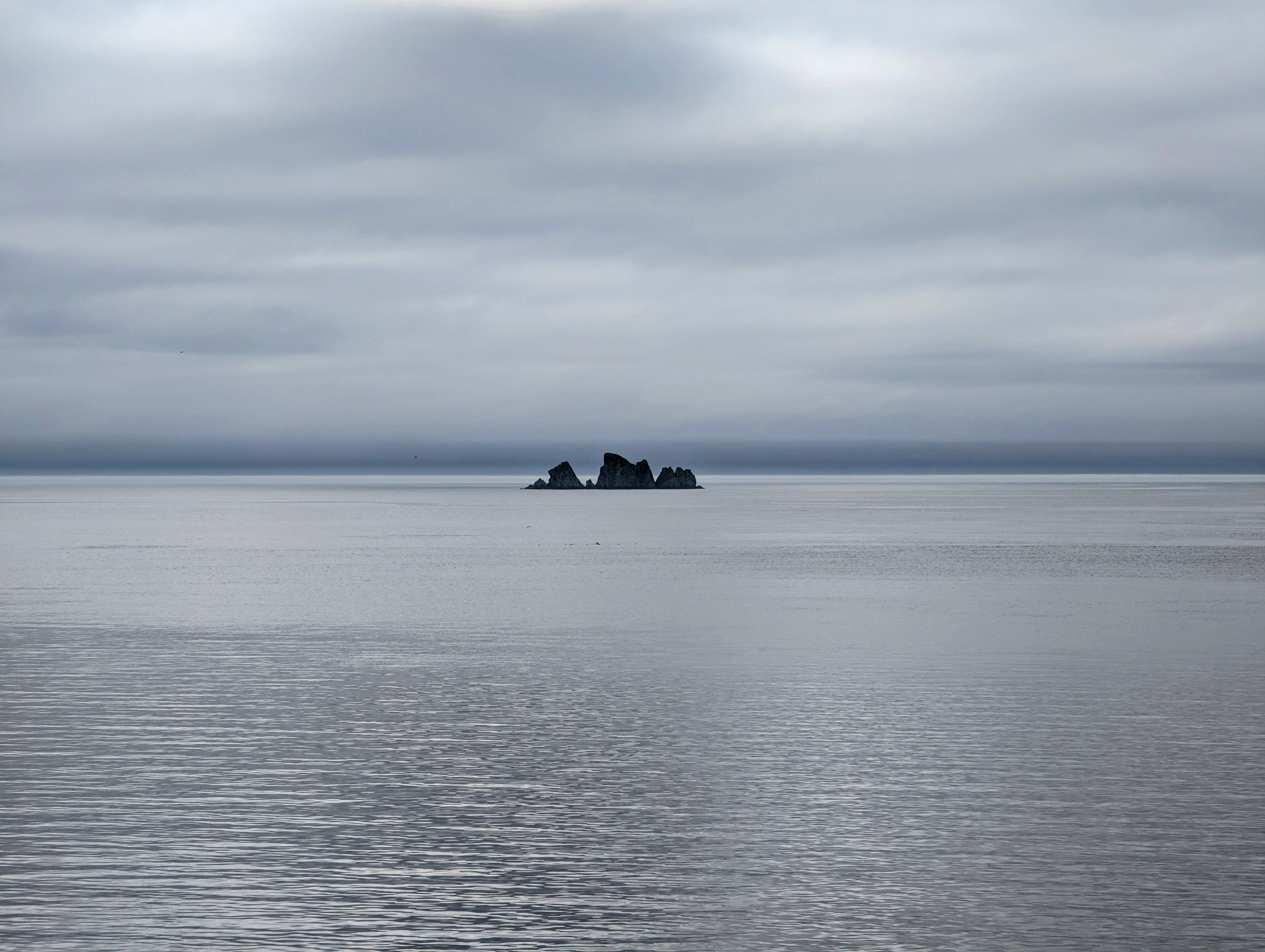
Witless Rock protruding from Witless Bay

Whiteway is located in a large open cove, known as Witless Bay. At the centre of the bay is Witless Rock, "a distinctive and jagged protrusion shown on English maps as early as 1775." The community was known as Witless or Witler's Bay, and was not settled until the mid-1800s.

A family tradition maintains that a man named Burgess, who deserted the ship Royal Gazette at Crocker's Cove in about 1847, was the first permanent settler. Two families were living there in 1869, likely those of Charles Burgess and John Pottle. By 1874 there was a population of 31.

Originally known as Witless Bay, the community was renamed to Whiteway by proclamation on August 13, 1912. This was done to avoid confusion with another Witless Bay, and in honour of former Prime Minister William Whiteway.

== Demographics ==
In the 2021 Census of Population conducted by Statistics Canada, Whiteway had a population of 351 living in 136 of its 174 total private dwellings, a change of −5.9% from its 2016 population of 373. With a land area of 22.53 km^{2} (8.70 sq mi), it had a population density of 15.6/km^{2} (40.4/sq mi) in 2021.

== See also ==
- List of cities and towns in Newfoundland and Labrador
