= Division No. 2, Newfoundland and Labrador =

Census division in Canada

Division No. 2
- Census division
- Interactive map of Division No. 2
- Coordinates: 47°21′42″N 54°53′35″W
- Country: Canada
- Province: Newfoundland and Labrador

Area
  - Total: 6,099.08 km^{2} (2,354.87 sq mi)
- As of 2016

Population (2016)
  - Total: 20,372
  - Density: 3.3402/km^{2} (8.6510/sq mi)

Division No. 2, Newfoundland and Labrador is a census division in the Canadian province of Newfoundland and Labrador, primarily comprising the Burin Peninsula. Like all census divisions in Newfoundland and Labrador, but unlike the census divisions of some other provinces, the division exists only as a statistical division for census data, and is not a political entity.

In the Canada 2016 Census, the division had a population of 20,372 (down from 21,351 in 2011) and a land area of 6,099.08 square kilometres.

== Towns ==
- Baine Harbour
- Bay L'Argent
- Burin
- English Harbour East
- Fortune
- Fox Cove-Mortier
- Frenchman's Cove
- Garnish
- Grand Bank
- Grand le Pierre
- Lamaline
- Lawn
- Lewin's Cove
- Little Bay East
- Lord's Cove
- Marystown
- Parkers Cove
- Point May
- Point au Gaul
- Red Harbour
- Rushoon
- St. Bernard's-Jacques Fontaine
- St. Lawrence
- Terrenceville
- Winterland

== Unorganized subdivisions ==
- Subdivision C
- Subdivision D
- Subdivision E
- Subdivision F
- Subdivision G
- Subdivision H
- Subdivision I
- Subdivision J
- Subdivision K
- Subdivision L

== Demographics ==
Historical populations Division No. 2, NL
Year	Pop.	±%
1951	22,366	—
1961	24,779	+10.8%
1971	27,320	+10.3%
1976	29,625	+8.4%
1981	30,368	+2.5%
1986	30,285	−0.3%
1991	29,345	−3.1%
1996	27,723	−5.5%
2001	24,371	−12.1%
2006	22,298	−8.5%
2011	21,351	−4.2%
2016	20,372	−4.6%
2021	19,392	−4.8%

In the 2021 Census of Population conducted by Statistics Canada, Division No. 2 had a population of 19,392 living in 8,891 of its 11,551 total private dwellings, a change of −4.8% from its 2016 population of 20,372. With a land area of 5,915.57 km^{2} (2,284.01 sq mi), it had a population density of 3.3/km^{2} (8.5/sq mi) in 2021.

== See also ==
- List of communities in Newfoundland and Labrador
