= Southern Harbour =

- Town
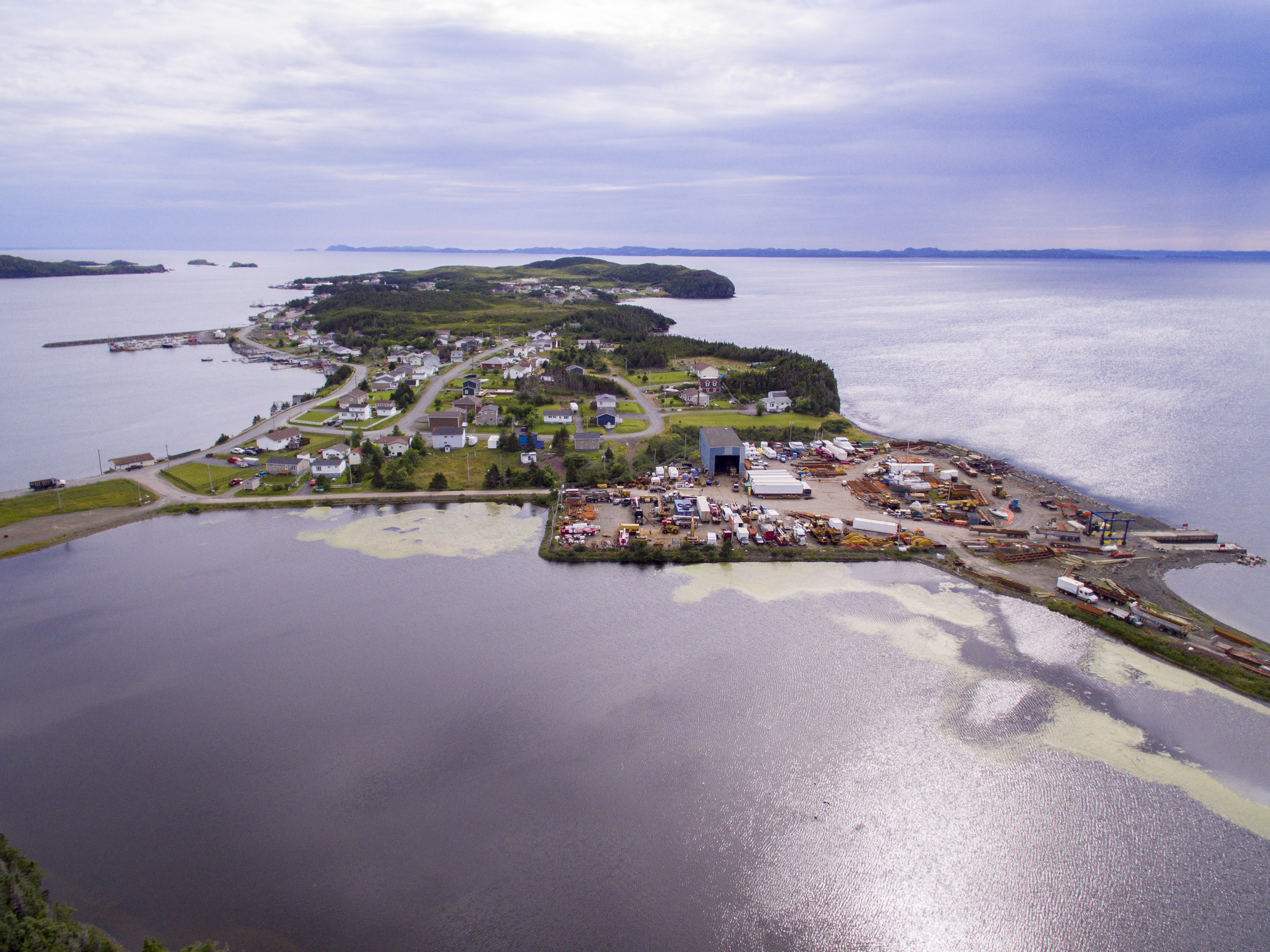

- Location of Southern Harbour in Newfoundland
- Coordinates: 47°43′20″N 53°57′12″W
- Country: Canada
- Province: Newfoundland and Labrador

Population (2021)
  - Total: 313
- Time zone: UTC-3:30 (Newfoundland Time)
  - Summer (DST): UTC-2:30 (Newfoundland Daylight)
- Postal code: A0B 3H0
- Area code: 709
- Highways: Route 1 (TCH)

Southern Harbour is a town in the province of Newfoundland and Labrador, Canada. The town had a population of 313 in the Canada 2021 Census.

== Demographics ==
In the 2021 Census of Population conducted by Statistics Canada, Southern Harbour had a population of 313 living in 152 of its 209 total private dwellings, a change of −20.8% from its 2016 population of 395. With a land area of 5.39 km^{2} (2.08 sq mi), it had a population density of 58.1/km^{2} (150.4/sq mi) in 2021.

== See also ==
- List of cities and towns in Newfoundland and Labrador
