= Heart's Desire, Newfoundland and Labrador =

Heart's Desire
- Town
- Interactive map of Heart's Desire
- Coordinates: 47°48′56″N 53°25′36″W
- Country: Canada
- Province: Newfoundland and Labrador

Government
  - Mayor: Brenda Oke

Population (2021)
  - Total: 184
- Time zone: UTC-3:30 (Newfoundland Time)
  - Summer (DST): UTC-2:30 (Newfoundland Daylight)
- Area code: 709
- Highways: Route 80

Heart's Desire is a town in the Canadian province of Newfoundland and Labrador located on the shores of Trinity Bay. The town had a population of 184 in the Canada 2021 Census.

== Demographics ==
In the 2021 Census of Population conducted by Statistics Canada, Heart's Desire had a population of 184 living in 88 of its 122 total private dwellings, a change of −13.6% from its 2016 population of 213. With a land area of 17.02 km^{2} (6.57 sq mi), it had a population density of 10.8/km^{2} (28.0/sq mi) in 2021.

== Street Naming ==
In Heart's Desire the streets are named by the families that reside on that street. For example, Langers Rd. is a street that had all of the Langer family living there at some point (most likely when the town was founded).

== See also ==
- List of cities and towns in Newfoundland and Labrador
