= Harbour Mille-Little Harbour East, Newfoundland and Labrador =

Harbour Mille-Little Harbour East
- Local service district / designated place
- Harbour Mille, circa 1900

- Location in Newfoundland
- Coordinates: 47.58583°N 54.87055°W
- Country: Canada
- Province: Newfoundland and Labrador
- Census division: Division 2
- Census subdivision: Subdivision I

Area
  - Land: 3.39 km^{2} (1.31 sq mi)

Population (2021)
  - Total: 100
  - Density: 29.5/km^{2} (76/sq mi)
- Time zone: UTC-3:30 (Newfoundland Time)
  - Summer (DST): UTC-2:30 (Newfoundland Daylight)
- Area code: 709
- Highways: Route 212

Harbour Mille-Little Harbour East is a local service district and designated place in the Canadian province of Newfoundland and Labrador.

== Geography ==
Harbour Mille-Little Harbour East is in Newfoundland within Subdivision I of Division No. 2. It is located on the Burin Peninsula. The designated place consists in the communities of Harbour Mille and Little Harbour East.

== Demographics ==
Historical population

Year	Pop.	±%
1986	343	—
1991	287	−16.3%
1996	224	−22.0%
2001	182	−18.8%

Year	Pop.	±%
2006	176	−3.3%
2011	136	−22.7%
2016	126	−7.4%
2021	100	−20.6%

As a designated place in the 2016 Census of Population conducted by Statistics Canada, Harbour Mille-Little Harbour East recorded a population of 126 living in 54 of its 86 total private dwellings, a change of −7.4% from its 2011 population of 136. With a land area of 3.56 km^{2} (1.37 sq mi), it had a population density of 35.4/km^{2} (91.7/sq mi) in 2016.

== Government ==
Harbour Mille-Little Harbour East is a local service district (LSD) that is governed by a committee responsible for the provision of certain services to the community. The chair of the LSD committee is Robert Pardy.

== See also ==
- List of communities in Newfoundland and Labrador
- List of designated places in Newfoundland and Labrador
- List of local service districts in Newfoundland and Labrador
