= Little Bay East =

- Town
- Little Bay East, circa 1900
- Interactive map of Little Bay East
- Coordinates: 47°33′21″N 54°51′50″W
- Country: Canada
- Province: Newfoundland and Labrador

Population (2021)
  - Total: 84
- Time zone: UTC-3:30 (Newfoundland Time)
  - Summer (DST): UTC-2:30 (Newfoundland Daylight)
- Area code: 709
- Highways: Route 212

Little Bay East is a town in the Canadian province of Newfoundland and Labrador. The town had a population of 84 in the Canada 2021 Census.

== Demographics ==
In the 2021 Census of Population conducted by Statistics Canada, Little Bay East had a population of 84 living in 43 of its 57 total private dwellings, a change of −33.9% from its 2016 population of 127. With a land area of 1.56 km^{2} (0.60 sq mi), it had a population density of 53.8/km^{2} (139.5/sq mi) in 2021.

== See also ==
- List of cities and towns in Newfoundland and Labrador
