= Monkstown, Newfoundland and Labrador =

Settlement in Newfoundland and Labrador

Coordinates: 47.570°N 54.437°W

Location of Monkstown in Newfoundland and Labrador

Monkstown is a settlement in Newfoundland and Labrador. Monkstown is approximately 110 km northeast of Marystown.

The town gave its family name to a type of dory - the "Monkstown Dory"
