= Winterland, Newfoundland and Labrador =

Winterland
- Town
- Location of Winterland in Newfoundland Winterland (Canada)
- Coordinates: 47°09′04″N 55°18′51″W
- Country: Canada
- Province: Newfoundland and Labrador

Population (2021)
  - Total: 398
- Time zone: UTC−03:30 (NST)
  - Summer (DST): UTC−02:30 (NDT)
- Area code: 709

Winterland is a town in the Canadian province of Newfoundland and Labrador. The town is considered to be a bedroom community of Marystown.

== Climate ==
Winterland has a humid continental climate (Dfb). The seasonal lag is unusual for the Atlantic coast with August being the warmest month and September closer to July than to June. February is the coldest month, especially with low temperatures. Winter lasts from mid-November through early April.

Climate data for Winterland
Month	Jan	Feb	Mar	Apr	May	Jun	Jul	Aug	Sep	Oct	Nov	Dec	Year
Record high °C (°F)	13.0 (55.4)	14.0 (57.2)	15.0 (59.0)	18.0 (64.4)	24.5 (76.1)	27.0 (80.6)	29.5 (85.1)	30.0 (86.0)	29.0 (84.2)	21.5 (70.7)	18.0 (64.4)	13.0 (55.4)	30.0 (86.0)
Mean daily maximum °C (°F)	−0.5 (31.1)	−0.6 (30.9)	1.9 (35.4)	6.5 (43.7)	12.2 (54.0)	16.3 (61.3)	20.7 (69.3)	21.3 (70.3)	17.5 (63.5)	12.0 (53.6)	6.8 (44.2)	2.2 (36.0)	9.7 (49.5)
Daily mean °C (°F)	−4.0 (24.8)	−4.3 (24.3)	−1.8 (28.8)	2.7 (36.9)	7.3 (45.1)	11.4 (52.5)	15.9 (60.6)	16.8 (62.2)	13.3 (55.9)	8.2 (46.8)	3.6 (38.5)	−0.9 (30.4)	5.7 (42.3)
Mean daily minimum °C (°F)	−7.5 (18.5)	−8.1 (17.4)	−5.4 (22.3)	−1.2 (29.8)	2.5 (36.5)	6.4 (43.5)	11.2 (52.2)	12.3 (54.1)	9.0 (48.2)	4.5 (40.1)	0.4 (32.7)	−3.9 (25.0)	1.7 (35.1)
Record low °C (°F)	−21.0 (−5.8)	−26.0 (−14.8)	−22.5 (−8.5)	−14.0 (6.8)	−7.0 (19.4)	−1.0 (30.2)	1.0 (33.8)	4.0 (39.2)	0.0 (32.0)	−6.0 (21.2)	−13.0 (8.6)	−20.0 (−4.0)	−26.0 (−14.8)
Average precipitation mm (inches)	128.9 (5.07)	126.0 (4.96)	118.6 (4.67)	118.9 (4.68)	111.9 (4.41)	108.1 (4.26)	92.3 (3.63)	91.7 (3.61)	145.8 (5.74)	159.9 (6.30)	142.1 (5.59)	133.9 (5.27)	1,478.1 (58.19)
Average rainfall mm (inches)	66.0 (2.60)	75.7 (2.98)	93.5 (3.68)	106.0 (4.17)	111.3 (4.38)	108.1 (4.26)	92.3 (3.63)	91.7 (3.61)	145.8 (5.74)	159.5 (6.28)	133.4 (5.25)	95.7 (3.77)	1,279 (50.35)
Average snowfall cm (inches)	62.9 (24.8)	50.3 (19.8)	25.1 (9.9)	12.9 (5.1)	0.6 (0.2)	0 (0)	0 (0)	0 (0)	0 (0)	0.5 (0.2)	8.7 (3.4)	38.2 (15.0)	199.2 (78.4)
Average precipitation days (≥ 0.2 mm)	13.6	12.4	10.4	10.0	10.5	9.8	9.2	9.3	9.6	11.8	12.5	13.2	132.1
Average rainy days (≥ 0.2 mm)	5.1	5.4	6.2	8.4	10.3	9.8	9.2	9.3	9.6	11.7	11.1	8.3	104.4
Average snowy days (≥ 0.2 cm)	9.2	7.5	4.8	1.8	0.1	0.0	0.0	0.0	0.0	0.1	1.6	5.6	30.7
Source: Environment and Climate Change Canada

== Demographics ==
In the 2021 Census of Population conducted by Statistics Canada, Winterland had a population of 398 living in 166 of its 224 total private dwellings, a change of 2.1% from its 2016 population of 390. With a land area of 54.44 km^{2} (21.02 sq mi), it had a population density of 7.3/km^{2} (18.9/sq mi) in 2021.

== See also ==
- List of cities and towns in Newfoundland and Labrador
