= Rushoon =

- Town
- Location of Rushoon in Newfoundland
- Coordinates: 47°21′27″N 54°54′53″W
- Country: Canada
- Province: Newfoundland and Labrador
- Incorporated: January 18, 1966

Population (2021)
  - Total: 229
- Time zone: UTC-3:30 (Newfoundland Time)
  - Summer (DST): UTC-2:30 (Newfoundland Daylight)
- Area code: 709
- Highways: Route 210

Rushoon is a town located north east of Marystown, Newfoundland and Labrador on the Burin Peninsula of Newfoundland and Labrador. The post office was established there in 1955 and the first postmaster was Ambrose Joseph Miller. It became a Local Government Community on January 18, 1966.

== Demographics ==
In the 2021 Census of Population conducted by Statistics Canada, Rushoon had a population of 229 living in 114 of its 131 total private dwellings, a change of −6.5% from its 2016 population of 245. With a land area of 5.89 km^{2} (2.27 sq mi), it had a population density of 38.9/km^{2} (100.7/sq mi) in 2021.
