= North Harbour, Placentia Bay, Newfoundland and Labrador =

Settlement in Newfoundland and Labrador

Coordinates: 47.852470°N 54.102099°W

Location of Goose Cove in Newfoundland and Labrador

North Harbour is a settlement and local service district in the Canadian province of Newfoundland and Labrador. It is located on the shore of Placentia Bay, right next to the settlement of Goose Cove.

== Government ==
North Harbour is a local service district (LSD) that is governed by a committee responsible for the provision of certain services to the community. In 2021, the chair of the LSD committee was Calvin Pearce.

== See also ==
- List of communities in Newfoundland and Labrador
- List of local service districts in Newfoundland and Labrador
