= Grand Beach, Newfoundland and Labrador =

Human settlement in Canada

Coordinates: 47°08′04″N 55°30′28″W

Grand Beach is a designated place in the Canadian province of Newfoundland and Labrador. It is on the Burin Peninsula of the island of Newfoundland.

== Geography ==
Grand Beach is in Newfoundland within Subdivision H of Division No. 2.

== Demographics ==
As a designated place in the 2016 Census of Population conducted by Statistics Canada, Grand Beach recorded a population of 65 living in 34 of its 89 total private dwellings, a change of 8.3% from its 2011 population of 60. With a land area of 5.45 km^{2} (2.10 sq mi), it had a population density of 11.9/km^{2} (30.9/sq mi) in 2016.

== See also ==
- List of communities in Newfoundland and Labrador
- List of designated places in Newfoundland and Labrador
