= Parker's Cove, Newfoundland and Labrador =

Parkers Cove
- Town
- Location of Parker's Cove in Newfoundland
- Coordinates: 47°23′38.10″N 54°51′59.52″W
- Country: Canada
- Province: Newfoundland and Labrador
- Census Division: 2

Area
  - Land: 4.77 km^{2} (1.84 sq mi)
- Elevation: 90 m (296 ft)

Population (2021)
  - Total: 233
  - Density: 63.5/km^{2} (164/sq mi)
- Time zone: UTC-3:30 (Newfoundland Time)
  - Summer (DST): UTC-2:30 (Newfoundland Daylight)
- Area code: 709

Parker's Cove or Parkers Cove is a town in the Canadian province of Newfoundland and Labrador. The town had a population of 233 in the Canada 2021 Census, a drop from 248 in 2016.

== Demographics ==
In the 2021 Census of Population conducted by Statistics Canada, Parkers Cove had a population of 233 living in 103 of its 130 total private dwellings, a change of −6% from its 2016 population of 248. With a land area of 4.77 km^{2} (1.84 sq mi), it had a population density of 48.8/km^{2} (126.5/sq mi) in 2021.

== See also ==
- List of cities and towns in Newfoundland and Labrador
