= Terrenceville =

- Town
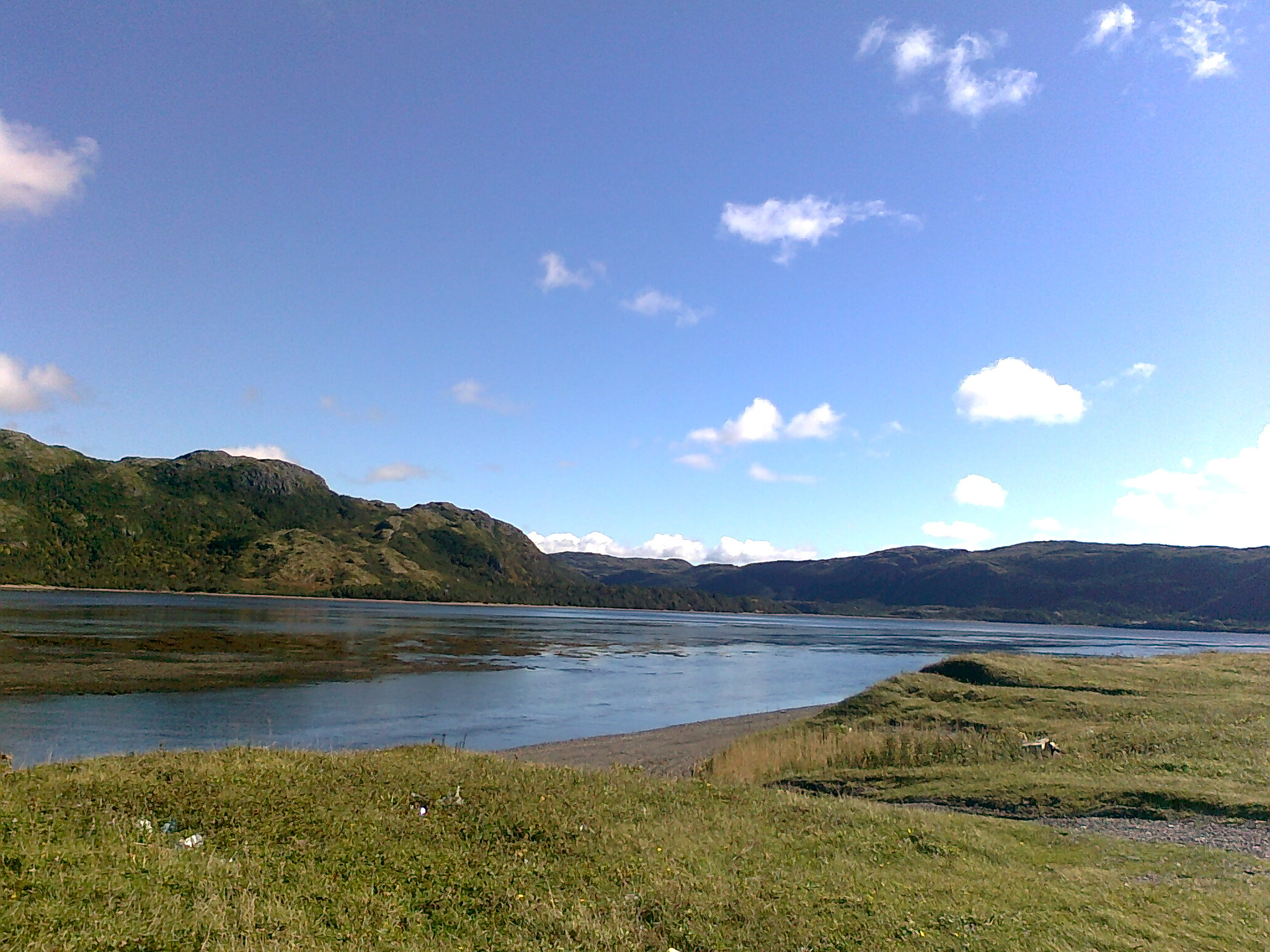

- Location of Terrenceville in Newfoundland
- Coordinates: 47°39′48″N 54°43′38″W
- Country: Canada
- Province: Newfoundland and Labrador

Population (2021)
  - Total: 446
- Time zone: UTC-3:30 (Newfoundland Time)
  - Summer (DST): UTC-2:30 (Newfoundland Daylight)
- Area code: 709
- Highways: Route 211

Terrenceville is a small town located on the Burin Peninsula of Newfoundland, Canada, south west of Swift Current.

== History ==
Terrenceville is located on the island of Newfoundland, approximately 80 kilometres (50 mi) north of Marystown on Route 211. It was known as Head of Fortune Bay until 1905, when it was renamed in honor of former Newfoundland governor Terence O'Brien.

The town was serviced by the C.N. coastal boats until early 1995. It was a main port for many isolated communities on the south coast that needed to get to places such as Marystown, Clarenville, and St. John's.

The population was 300 in 1944, 424 in 1951 and 521 in 1956. Like many other towns in rural NL, Terrenceville, has seen its population decline due to many families having to leave for full-time employment, as well as an aging population which requires medical facilities.

== Geography ==
Terrenceville is located in a valley at the head of Fortune Bay which is separated into two bits. The barsway, which is fresh water, and the miles barsway, which is saltwater. This separation is caused by a sand bar dividing the two bodies of water.

== Demographics ==
In the 2021 Census of Population conducted by Statistics Canada, Terrenceville had a population of 446 living in 191 of its 223 total private dwellings, a change of −7.5% from its 2016 population of 482. With a land area of 15.12 km^{2} (5.84 sq mi), it had a population density of 29.5/km^{2} (76.4/sq mi) in 2021.

== Recent events ==
In the past, the Eastern School Board had come under fire for the declining conditions of the local K-12 school St. Joseph's All Grade. In September 2007, mold was found in the building's gymnasium roof, and thus the roof had to be replaced.

In July 2007, Terrenceville had its first Come Home Year celebrations.

Every year, usually the first weekend in August, The Fire Dept. hosts a festival now known as "The Bottom of the Bay Festival" which often attracts many community members, those from other communities, as well as sightseers. In 2020 the festival was not held, due to quarantine restrictions, as well as public opinion preferring the festival not go ahead.

In 2015, Transport Canada sought to sell or divest itself of its local port facility.

== See also ==
- List of cities and towns in Newfoundland and Labrador
- List of people of Newfoundland and Labrador
