= English Harbour East =

Coordinates: 47°38′00″N 54°54′00″W

- Town
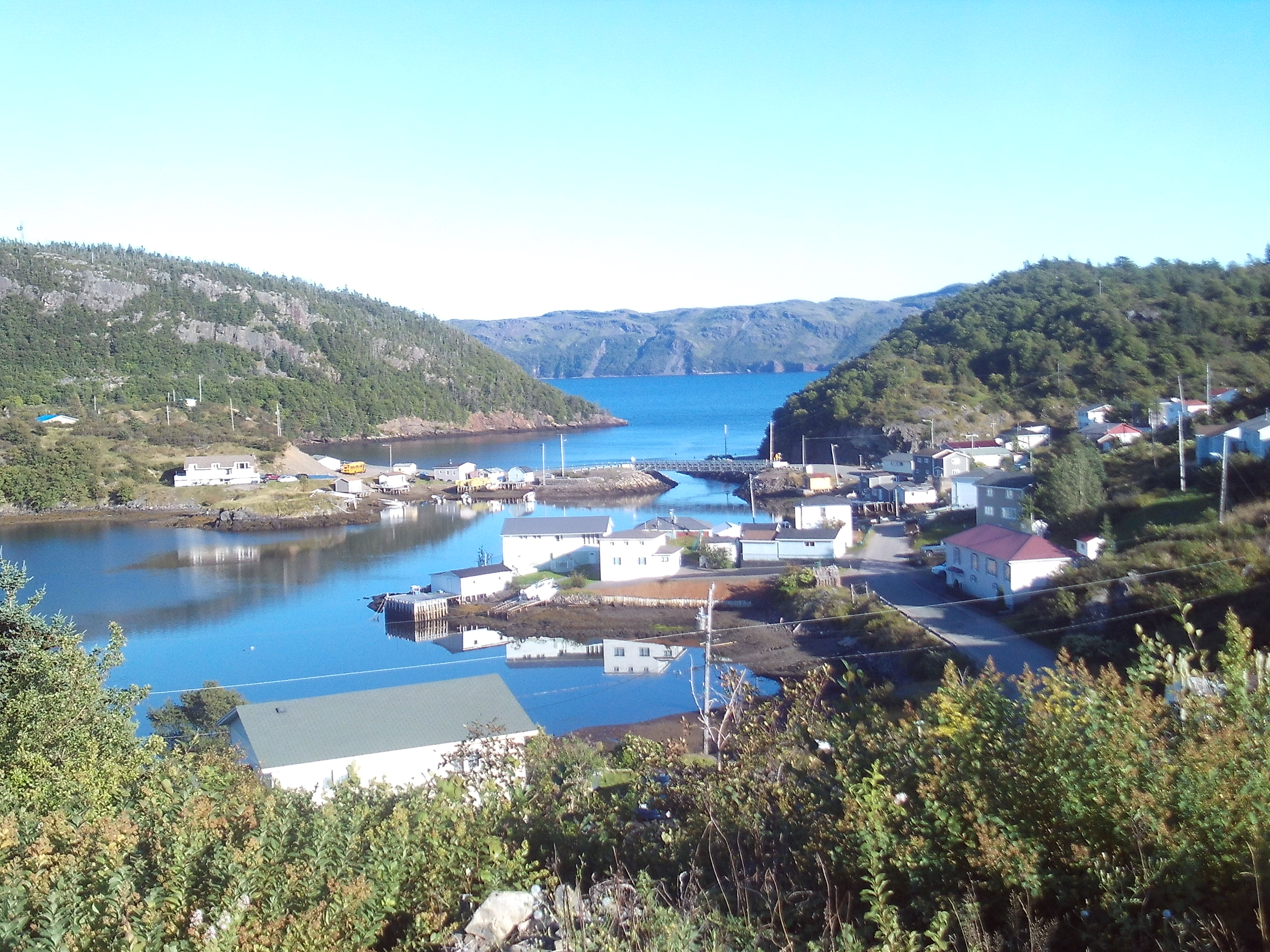

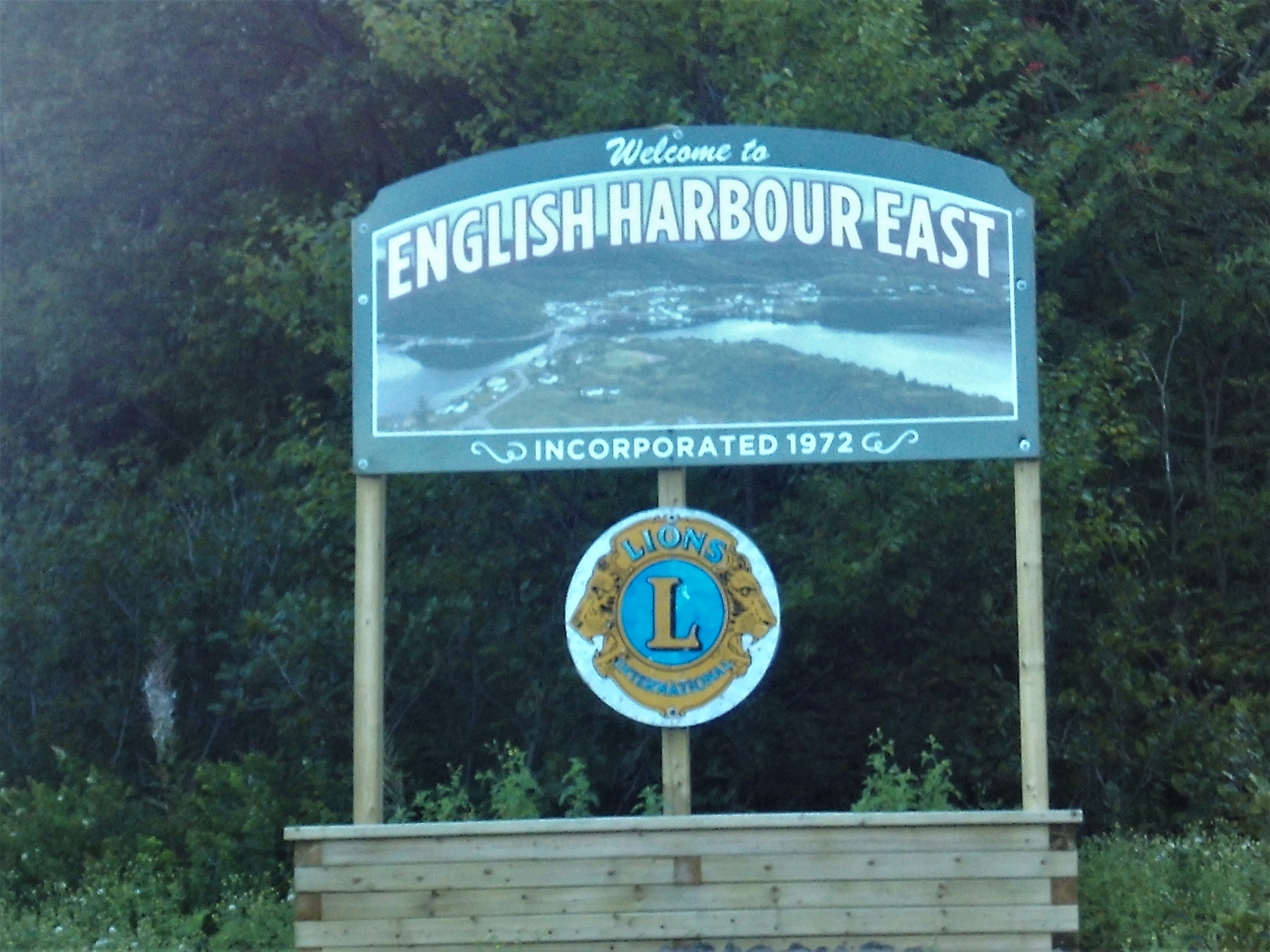
- Country: Canada
- Province: Newfoundland and Labrador

Government
  - Mayor: Laura Lee Labour
  - Clerk: Courtney Fizzard

Population (2021)
  - Total: 117
- Time zone: UTC– 3:30 (Newfoundland Time)
  - Summer (DST): UTC– 2:30 (Newfoundland Daylight)
- Area code: 709
- Highways: Route 211

English Harbour East is a town in the Canadian province of Newfoundland and Labrador. It is located on the northeast side of Fortune Bay. Settled first by the Mi’kmaq of Newfoundland which used land on the "Neck" of the harbour, they were joined in the early 1800s, by the English Dodge family and by Irishman Thomas Hynes Sr. European fishermen were first brought to the small community by English merchant family of Newman and Co. based in Harbour Breton, the firm of merchant John Gorman, and the Jersey firm of Nicholle and Co. The town had a population of 117 in the Canada 2021 Census.

== Geography ==
Its boundaries are established by the Town of English Harbour East Order under the Municipalities Act (Newfoundland and Labrador).

== History and Economy ==
Used by the Mi'kmaq in the years prior to European settlement, English Harbour East was permanently settled by the 1830s. In 1831, prominent Newfoundland fisherman Thomas Hynes, who defied the Bait Act, was born in English Harbour East. George Dodge of England and his family were residents by 1835.

English Harbour East's steady growth in the mid to late 19th century coincided with the success of the cod and herring fishery in Fortune Bay. Its residents were primarily fishermen and planters at the time. English Harbour East also significantly prospered in conjunction with the herring fishery and the sale of bait to United States traders. This was despite laws forbidding such action and the patrol of Fortune Bay waters by wardens who frequently (with little success) warned residents of the law and were on the receiving end of their ire. One such case was where the patrolling officer warned an offender named Hackett and reported in annoyance: “got a fair share of slang (abuse) here from sea-lawyer Hackett; 2 seines, 5 crafts." During this period, a Way Office was established in 1883 on July 1, and a post office was created with the first Postmistress being Annie Hackett in 1891.

Beginning in the 1890s, the lobster fishery (including lobster factories) became a staple of income for many families in the town. In the first two decades of the 20th Century, salmon was also tinned by ambitious merchants. Many people moved to the area from such remote communities as Conne and New Harbour in the early to mid 20th Century.

=== Mass Exodus to Woods Island, Bay of Islands ===
Between 1897 and 1902, several dozens of families migrated from English Harbour East to Woods Island, Newfoundland and Labrador on Newfoundland's west coast in search of a better herring fishery and living conditions.

=== 20th century ===
By the mid-late 20th century, many workers of English Harbour East were forced to commute to work from outside the town. This pushed five families from 1965 and 1975 to resettle to the nearby towns of Harbour Mille, Harbour Breton, and Terrenceville. Road construction to connect English Harbour East to nearby Grand le Pierre for a distance of 6 miles began in 1970 and completed shortly thereafter at an estimated cost of $200,000. The community was incorporated as a town in 1973 with residents mostly being employed in the fishery and a government wharf was built. This coincided with the addition of telephone service to the town that same year. Vandalism became a serious problem in the small town in the mid-late 1990s as the school, several houses, and other buildings were broken into or damaged. In 1996, in response to various vandalism complaints, the community adopted the COPs program which was operated in July 1996 by resident Shirley Kearley. Kearley would patrol around the town and visit various buildings and vacant houses to help deter vandalism in the program which was the first of its kind for the Burin Peninsula. In 2003, a complete waterfront infrastructure project was completed in the town to revitalize the fishing premises and government wharf area. This $600,000 retrofit including a concrete foundation rather than a wooden one.

In the first decade of the 21st Century, several fishing sheds from abandoned communities elsewhere in Newfoundland were moved to English Harbour East and restored.

== Education ==
A Roman Catholic school was operating in English Harbour East by 1878.

Throughout the later part of the 20th century, the community was formally served by St. George's School, which in 1981 had students from Kindergarten to Grade Nine, and high school students were bussed to the nearby St. Joseph's school in Terrenceville. St. George's School closed in 2006.

== Culture and Religion ==
Despite beginning in 1836 as a majority of Church of England settlement, by 1874, English Harbour East's population was of majorly Roman Catholic residents.

In 1975, resident Margaret Bolt explained that once a month the community would have a "time" or party where all of the residents would gather to socialize.

== Demographics ==
In the 2021 Census of Population conducted by Statistics Canada, English Harbour East had a population of 117 living in 48 of its 66 total private dwellings, a change of −15.8% from its 2016 population of 139. With a land area of 2.81 km^{2} (1.08 sq mi), it had a population density of 41.6/km^{2} (107.8/sq mi) in 2021.

Census of English Harbour East
Population in 2016	139
Population in 2011	145
Population in 2006	170
Population in 2001	220
Population in 1996	250
Population in 1991	290
Population in 1986	300
Population in 1945	210
Population in 1921	166
Population in 1891	138
Population in 1869	101
Population in 1857 (Including English Harbour West)	38
Population in 1836	19

== See also ==
- List of communities in Newfoundland and Labrador
- Thomas Hynes
- Burin Peninsula
- Newfoundland outport
