= Swift Current, Newfoundland and Labrador =

Human settlement in Canada

Coordinates: 47.883931°N 54.211349°W

Location of Swift Current in Newfoundland and Labrador

Swift Current is a community and designated place in the Canadian province of Newfoundland and Labrador. Swift Current is located approximately 20 km southwest of Goobies. It is a part of the local service district of Swift Current-Black River.

Swift Current is a community represented within the Qalipu First Nation.

== Geography ==
Swift Current is in Newfoundland within Subdivision K of Division No. 2. It is on Mouse Islet to the northeast of the Burin Peninsula between Grand Le Pierre and Goobies, 5 kilometres west of the Black River. The Burin Peninsula Highway (Route 210) passes through Swift Current.

== Demographics ==
As a designated place in the 2016 Census of Population conducted by Statistics Canada, Swift Current recorded a population of 207 living in 91 of its 123 total private dwellings, a change of -0.5% from its 2011 population of 208. With a land area of 10.62 km^{2} (4.10 sq mi), it had a population density of 19.5/km^{2} (50.5/sq mi) in 2016.

== Government ==
Swift Current was a local service district (LSD) governed by a committee responsible for the provision of certain services to the community. In 2021, the chair of the LSD committee was Ward Butt.

Since 2024, the community is part of the newly created LSD of Swift Current-Black River.

== See also ==
- Burin Peninsula
- List of designated places in Newfoundland and Labrador
