= Grand le Pierre =

Grand Le Pierre
- Town
- Motto(s): Small town, Big hearts
- Location of Grand Le Pierre in Newfoundland
- Coordinates: 47.6825°N 54.7834°W
- Country: Canada
- Province: Newfoundland and Labrador

Population (2021)
  - Total: 176
  - Density: 1.5/km^{2} (3.9/sq mi)
- Time zone: UTC-3:30 (Newfoundland Time)
  - Summer (DST): UTC-2:30 (Newfoundland Daylight)
- Postal code: A0E 1Y0
- Area code: 709
- Highways: Route 211

Grand Le Pierre is a town in the Canadian province of Newfoundland and Labrador. The town had a population of 176 in the Canada 2021 Census.

== History ==
During the 1990s, the council of Grand Le Pierre, led by Mayor George Fizzard, conceived a plan to establish a water bottling plant in the town. The plant would receive runoff water from Gisborne Lake, located within the town's area boundary, and then exported through a facility that was planned to be built in the town's harbour. Newfoundland's Premier at the time, Brian Tobin, first approved this plan but later retracted his approval, disallowing the project to continue, this decision sparked outrage in the community, as it was expected that 150 jobs were to become available if the plant was established. No considerations of reviving this project has been made in the years since its termination.

== Demographics ==
In the 2021 Census of Population conducted by Statistics Canada, Grand Le Pierre had a population of 176 living in 76 of its 98 total private dwellings, a change of −25.1% from its 2016 population of 235. With a land area of 142.81 km^{2} (55.14 sq mi), it had a population density of 1.2/km^{2} (3.2/sq mi) in 2021.

== See also ==
- List of cities and towns in Newfoundland and Labrador
