= Marystown =

- Town
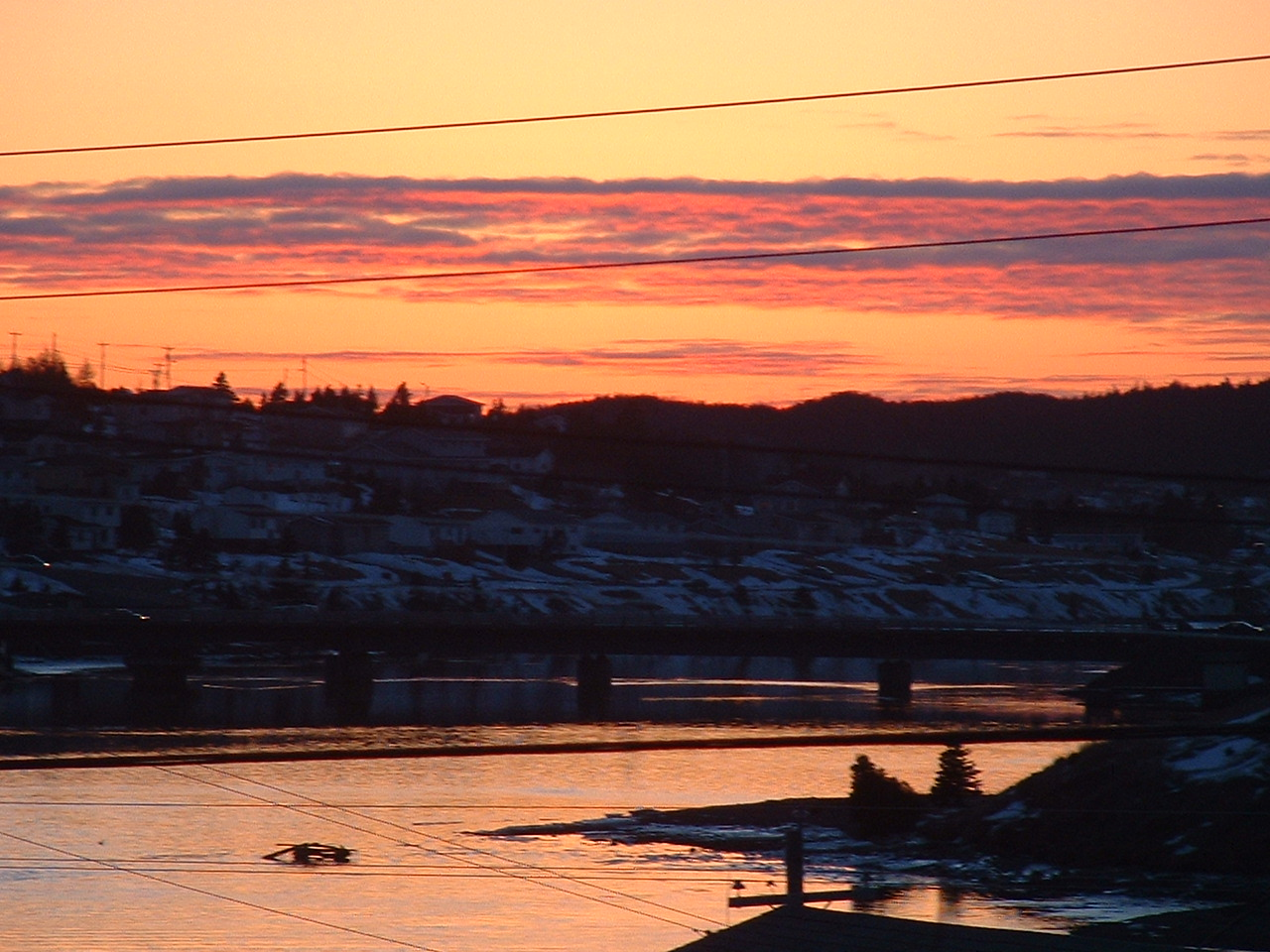
- Winter sunset over the harbour featuring Canning Bridge

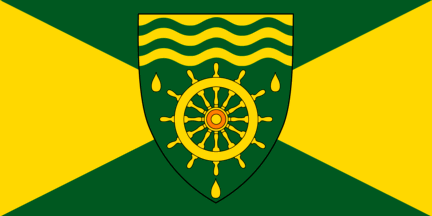
- Flag Coat of arms
- Motto(s): "Ubi Incrementum Est Via Vitae" (Latin) "Where Growth Is A Way Of Life"
- Location of Marystown in Newfoundland
- Coordinates: 47°10′N 55°10′W
- Country: Canada
- Province: Newfoundland and Labrador
- Census division: 2

Government
  - Type: Marystown Town Council
  - Mayor: Gerry Brenton
  - MP: Jonathan Rowe (C)
  - MHA: Jeff Dwyer (PC)

Area
  - Total: 61.97 km^{2} (23.93 sq mi)
- Elevation: 14 m (46 ft)

Population (2021)
  - Total: 5,204
  - Density: 85.8/km^{2} (222/sq mi)
- Time zone: UTC-3:30 (Newfoundland Time)
  - Summer (DST): UTC-2:30 (Newfoundland Daylight)
- Postal code span: A0E
- Area code: 709
- Highways: Route 210 / Route 220 / Route 220A
- Website: Town of Marystown Website

Marystown is a town in the province of Newfoundland and Labrador, Canada, with a population of around 5,000. Situated 306 kilometres or 190 miles from the province's capital, St. John's, it is on the Burin Peninsula. Until the early 1990s, its economy was largely based on shipbuilding; it is due in part to this that the town experienced a population increase of 295% in just over a decade. The town was also dependent on the fish plant for employment.

Though the shipyard still holds a presence in the town, residents have had to look elsewhere for economic subsistence in the last decade or so. The closure of the fish plants in Newfoundland has also had its hand in the decline in economic subsistence. Mortier Bay also served a strategic role during World War II, and was the site selected to evacuate the Royal Family and regroup the British Navy in the event of German invasion of Britain. Currently fish farming and the shipyard remain important to the local economy; in fact, construction of the world's largest fish hatchery, the Grieg NL project, began at the town in 2019.

== Geography ==
Marystown lies on hummocky pyroclastic volcanic rock of mixed composition. This rock is overlain by very stony sandy loam glacial till which has a classic podzol soil profile in undisturbed areas; this is named as Toslow soil association. The vegetation at the time of the soil survey was a barren dominated by sphagnum mosses, heath-type shrubs, and mountain alder. Forest vegetation, mostly of coniferous trees, has developed in many areas around town as can be seen on Google Street View.

== Demographics ==
Historical population
Year	Pop.	±%
1961	1,691	—
1991	6,739	+298.5%
1996	6,742	+0.0%
2001	5,908	−12.4%
2006	5,436	−8.0%
2011	5,506	+1.3%
2016	5,316	−3.5%
2021	5,204	−2.1%

In the 2021 Census of Population conducted by Statistics Canada, Marystown had a population of 5,204 living in 2,328 of its 2,609 total private dwellings, a change of −2.1% from its 2016 population of 5,316. With a land area of 62.23 km^{2} (24.03 sq mi), it had a population density of 83.6/km^{2} (216.6/sq mi) in 2021.

Canada 2006 Census		Population	% of Total Population
Visible minority group Source:	South Asian	40	0.7%
Visible minority group Source:	Arab	20	0.4%
Total visible minority population		60	1.1%
Aboriginal group Source:	First Nations	20	0.4%
Aboriginal group Source:	Métis	40	0.7%
Total Aboriginal population		60	1.1%
White		5,315	97.8%
Total population		5,435	100%

=== Religion ===
While the town contains a diverse mixture of churches of varying denominations, the town is almost entirely Christian. The information presented from a 2001 census from Statistics Canada indicates that 68% of the population is Roman Catholic.

- Roman Catholic; Sacred Heart Parish
- United; Calvary United Church
- Anglican; St. Michael's Church;St. Mary's Church
- Salvation Army; Faith and Hope Corps
- Pentecostal; Calvary Pentecostal Church
- Seventh-Day Adventist; Marystown Seventh-Day Adventist Church

==== Sacred Heart Parish ====
Established in 1910, the original edifice, constructed in the early 1900s, had to be reconstructed in the late 1970s due to a fire. In more recent years, the church has received much attention from the news when a family of illegal immigrants from Israel resided there as a place of sanctuary. Alexi and Angela Portnoy and their five children (the three youngest of whom were born in Canada) stayed in the church's basement for a total of 962 days while seeking citizenship status. The family was ultimately deported to Israel, but their supporters vowed to try to help the family to return.

==== Calvary Pentecost Church ====
Establishment of the church began in 1956. The first Pentecost church in Marystown was officially completed in 1958. Since then there have been three Pentecost churches erected in the Marystown area: the original edifice in 1958, the second in 1974, and the current church that was built in 1995.

==== Seventh-Day Adventist Church ====
The Seventh Day Adventists established a significant population in Marystown in the 1970s. The construction of the first church began in 1985 along with a Seventh-Day school. Though the construction was completed much earlier, 1987 denotes the official church opening.

== Economy ==
=== Workforce ===
By 2018, it was recognized that the region exhibited significant unemployment; further, the potential workforce was not sufficient to support shipyard and aquaculture expansions envisioned in subsequent years. This led to a call for loosening immigration regulations so that the workforce could be expanded with immigrant workers.

Shipyard workers are represented by at least two unions, Marine Workers Federation - Unifor Local 20 and the Marine Office and Technical Employees Unit.

=== Shipbuilding and aquaculture ===
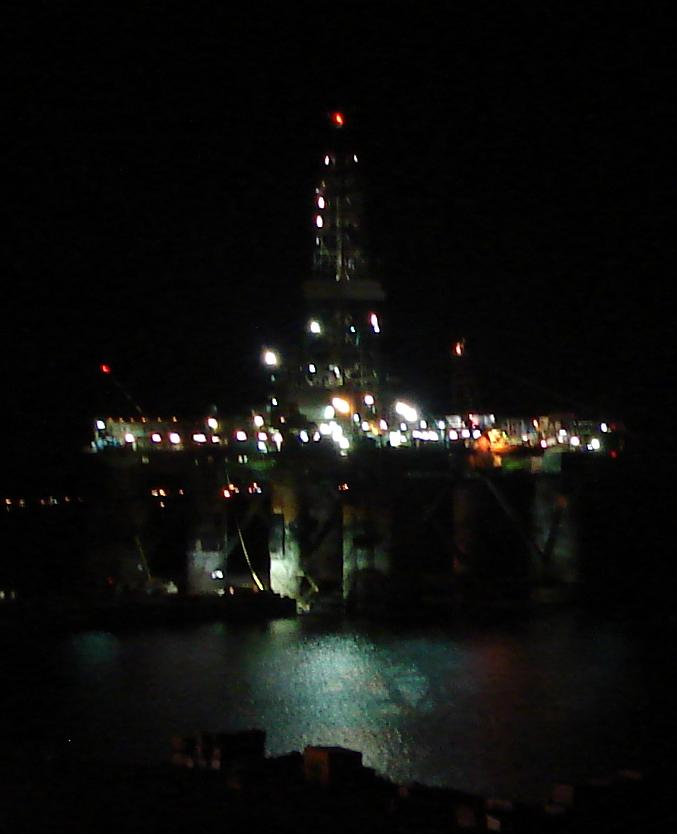
Oil platform docked in Mortier Bay.

Shipbuilding began in Marystown not long after it was settled in the early 1800s. The earliest records of shipbuilding in the area date to 1908, and Marystown's first shipyard was constructed in 1918 north of the town.

The Marystown Co-operative shipyard opened in 1939 was destroyed by fire in 1941; originally committed to building fishing trawlers, it was converted to minesweeper construction for World War II. Work at the site began in 1938 when the Newfoundland Commission of Government established the first government shipyard. The Marystown Shipyard was established by the Newfoundland government in 1959 for the construction of longliners, "motor-powered decked vessels ranging from 35 to 65 feet in length." This facility was operated as a Crown Asset until the 1980s, when it was privatized.

Construction of a nearby additional shipbuilding facility began in 1966 and it was opened in 1967 by the shipping company Canadian Vickers, initially for the construction and repair of fishing vessels. This facility has changed owners and names over the years; the initial owner was Newfoundland Marine Works Ltd., until 1973. Ownership changed hands to Marystown Shipping Enterprises Ltd., which held title until 1978, when ownership changed to Marystown Shipyard Ltd. In response to a decline in the cod fishery industry, the Newfoundland government refurbished the shipyard in 1992. Ownership left Canada when the American company Friede Goldman Ltd. bought the facility in 1998, and remained in American hands when ownership changed again in 2002 to Kiewit Offshore Services Ltd. By 2019, the shipyard had been idle for four years and was acquired by Marbase Marystown Inc. (usually just Marbase), under a 20-year lease with the intention of establishing a service hub supporting regional aquaculture, the first of its kind in Canada. Marbase is a partnership between one Newfoundland businessman, Paul Antle, and the Norwegian company Amar Group AS.

In 2019, Marbase Cleanerfish Ltd., began work on a commercial lumpfish hatchery in Marystown, with an anticipated customer base of Atlantic salmon farm operators. As of 2020, government approval of the work in relation to environmental impact had not yet been completed.

=== Fish plant ===
For many years, the fish plant in Marystown created hundreds of jobs in the small town. Originally operated by Fishery Products International (FPI) the plant was sold to Ocean Choice International (OCI) in 2007. In 2011, the plant employed roughly 240 people seasonally. In November 2011, provincial government-appointed auditors backed up claims by OCI that they were losing millions of dollars each year operating the fish plant. On 2 December 2011, the company announced that they would permanently close their Marystown and Port Union fish plants and invest money into other plants in the province. Demolition of the plant began in 2015.

== Attractions ==
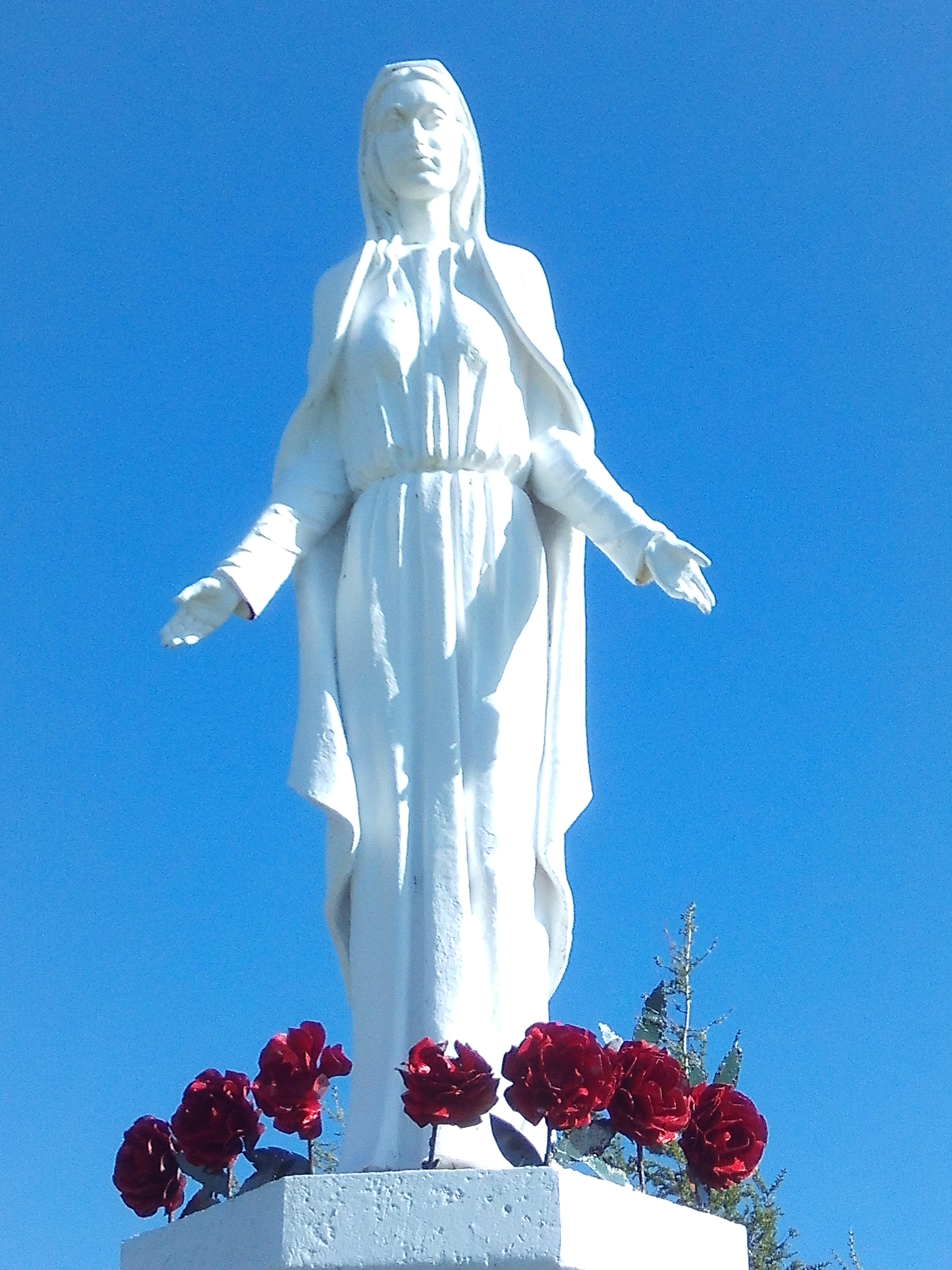
Shrine of Marymount

Attractions to the town include:

- Marystown Heritage Museum
- The Shrine of Marymount (statue of the Virgin Mary)
- Marystown Public Library
- MADD Burin Peninsula Memorial Gardens

=== Shrine of Marymount ===
The Shrine of Marymount, or The Marymount as it is locally referred to, is one of the largest Marian statues erected in Newfoundland. It stands at fifteen feet tall, and overlooks the entirety of Marystown, sitting at one of the highest points in the area.

== Sports ==
Despite being in a province reporting one of the highest obesity rates in Canada, Marystown has sport enthusiasts in disciplines including softball, soccer, swimming, track and field and hockey. Marystown has many attractions for both residents and visitors:

- Swimming pool
- Professional track and field complex (home of the Mariners Athletics Club {MAC})
- Two softball diamonds: The Kinsmen Field and The Lions Field
- Soccer pitch (home to the 2004 Challenge Cup Champions "Marystown United")
- Ice rink/live entertainment complex
- Scenic walking trails
- YMCA facility

The urban centre is surrounded by rolling hills and densely wooded areas, as a result Marystown is frequented by hunting, fishing, camping and ATV enthusiasts. As of 2021, there is also a work-in-progress splash pad; it is located at the Marystown track and field complex.

== Education ==
Marystown and surrounding area is home to four public schools, Marystown Central High School, Sacred Heart Academy, Pearce Junior High, and Donald C. Jamieson Academy. Post secondary institutions include two public trade colleges: College of the North Atlantic and Keyin College.

Marystown's public schools are serviced under the Newfoundland and Labrador English School District.

== Media ==
=== Radio ===
Marystown currently receives numerous radio stations including:

- FM 88.3: CHCM-FM ("VOCM"), Full-service radio
- FM 90.3: CBNM-FM, CBC Radio One
- FM 91.7: CBN-FM-5, CBC Music
- FM 99.5: VOAR-2-FM ("Lighthouse FM"), Christian radio/music

== Notable people ==
- Kaetlyn Osmond (skating arena and part of route 210 named in her honour)

== See also ==
- List of cities and towns in Newfoundland and Labrador
