= Newfoundland and Labrador Route 430 =

Highway in Newfoundland and Labrador, Canada

Route 430
- Great Northern Peninsula Highway; Viking Trail

Route information
- Maintained by Newfoundland and Labrador Department of Transportation and Infrastructure
- Length: 413 km (257 mi)

Major junctions
- South end: Route 1 (TCH) in Deer Lake
- Route 422 northwest of Deer Lake; Route 431 in Wiltondale; Route 432 in Plum Point; Route 432 north of Main Brook; Route 435 south of Cook's Harbour; Route 436 northwest of St. Anthony
- North end: West Street / Goose Cove Road in St. Anthony

Location
- Country: Canada
- Province: Newfoundland and Labrador

Highway system
- Highways in Newfoundland and Labrador
| ← Route 422 | → Route 431 |

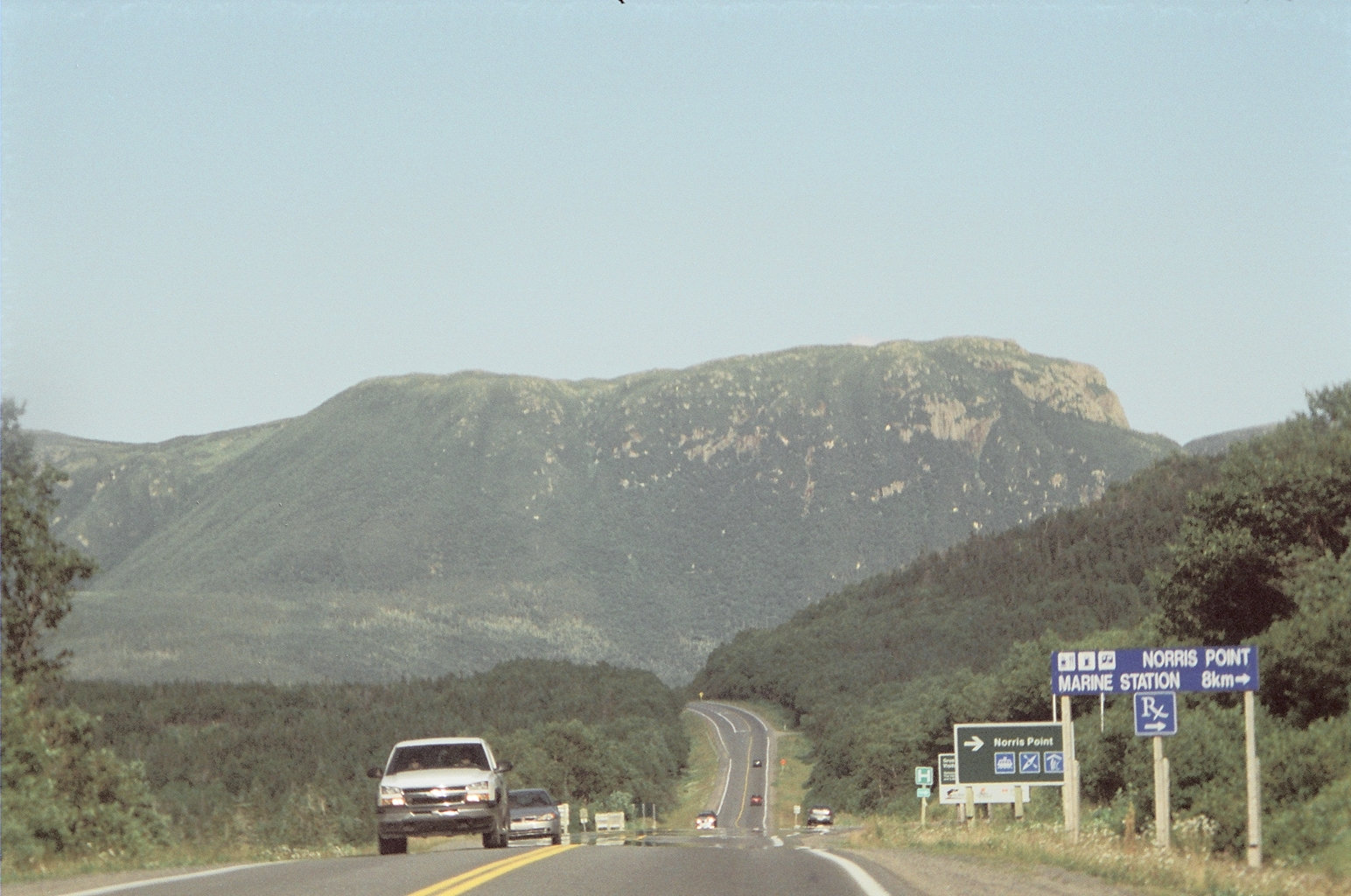
Route 430 in Gros Morne National Park

Route 430 is a 413-kilometre-long (257 mi) paved highway that traverses the Great Northern Peninsula of Newfoundland in the Canadian province of Newfoundland and Labrador. The route begins at the intersection of Route 1 (The Trans Canada Highway) in Deer Lake and ends in St. Anthony. Officially known as the Great Northern Peninsula Highway, it has been designated as the Viking Trail since it is the main auto route to L'Anse aux Meadows, the only proven Viking era settlement in North America. It is the primary travel route in the Great Northern Peninsula and the only improved highway between Deer Lake and St. Anthony. It is the main access route to the Labrador Ferry terminal in St. Barbe.

The route passes along the western coast of Newfoundland with views of the Gulf of St. Lawrence and Strait of Belle Isle to the west and the Long Range Mountains to the east. It passes through or near several towns and villages including Rocky Harbour, Port au Choix, and St. Barbe as well as Gros Morne National Park.

Route 430 is the longest provincial route on the island portion of the province that branches out from Route 1.

== Route description ==
Route 430 begins at an interchange with Route 1 (Trans-Canada Highway, Exit 16) in Deer Lake and it heads northwest to immediately cross the Humber River and have intersections with local roads leading to the Nicholsville neighbourhood and the town of Reidville. The highway now leaves Deer Lake and continues northwest through rural areas to have an intersection with Route 422 (Cormack Road) before it begins winding its way through the Long Range Mountains. Route 430 passes through Jack Ladder, Bonne Bay Pond, and Wiltondale, where it has an intersection with Route 431 (Bonne Bay Road), before passing through Gros Morne National Park. The highway now exits both the National Park and the mountain range as it passes through Rocky Harbour, where it meets a local road to Norris Point, before passing through neighbouring Lobster Cove, where it passes by the Lobster Cove Head Lighthouse. Route 430 begins heading up the western coastline of the Great Northern Peninsula (the Strait of Belle Isle side), passing through Bakers Brook, the Green Point portion of Gros Morne National Park, Sally's Cove (where it crosses the Western Brook), and Gulls Marsh. The highway now passes Gros Morne National Park's Western Brook Pond trailhead before passing through St. Pauls (where it crosses St. Paul's Bay). Route 430 has intersections with two local roads leading to Cow Head before passing through Three Mile Rock, Parson's Pond (where it crosses the Parson's Pond River), Portland Creek (where it crosses the creek of the same name), Daniel's Harbour, Bellburns, and River of Ponds (where it crosses the river of the same name) before the road turns more inland. The highway now passes through Hawke's Bay (where it crosses the Torrent River and Big East River) to meet a local road leading to Port Saunders and Port au Choix before Route 430 rejoins the coastline at Eddies Cove West. Route 430 passes through Barr'd Harbour and turns more inland again to pass through Castor River South (where it crosses the Castors River) to have intersections with local roads leading to the neighbouring settlements of Castor River North, Bartlett's Harbour, Reefs Harbour, Shoal Cove West, and New Ferolle before having an intersection with Route 432 (Main Point Highway/Grenfell Loop). The highway begins following the coastline again as it passes through Plum Point, where it meets a local road leading to Bird Cove and Brig Bay, before passing through Blue Cove, where it meets a local road leading to Pond Cove. Route 430 now has an intersection with a local road leading to Forrester's Point and Black Duck Cove before having an intersection with St. Barbe Ferry Road, which provides access to the town of St. Barbe and the Labrador Ferry. The highway passes northeastward through Anchor Point, Deadman's Cove, Flower's Cove, Savage Cove, Pines Cove, Green Island Cove, and Green Island Brook before turning eastward and inland after passing through Eddies Cove and just south of Watt's Point Ecological Reserve. Route 430 now passes by St. Anthony Airport, where it has another intersection with Route 432 (Main Point Highway/Grenfell Loop), before passing through Hare Island and having intersections with Route 435 (Cook's Harbour Road) and Route 436 (L'Anse aux Meadows Road). Route 430 crosses the Parkers River in between these two intersections. The highway now curves to the southeast to have an intersection with a local road leading to St. Anthony Bight, St. Carols, and Great Brehat before it enters St. Anthony, where Route 430 comes to an end at an intersection between West Street and Goose Cove Road just north of downtown.

== Major intersections ==
| Location | km | mi | Destinations | Notes |
|---|---|---|---|---|
| Deer Lake | 0 | 0.0 | Route 1 (TCH) – Grand Falls-Windsor, Corner Brook | Interchange; exit 16 on Route 1; southern terminus |
| Deer Lake | 2 | 1.2 | George Aaron Drive - Nicholsville | |
| Deer Lake | 3 | 1.9 | Reidville Road - Reidville | |
| | 7 | 4.3 | Route 422 east (Veterans Drive) – Cormack | Western terminus of Route 422 |
| Wiltondale | 30 | 19 | Route 431 west (Bonne Bay Road) – Woody Point, Trout River | Eastern terminus of Route 431 |
| | 31– 65 | 19– 40 | Passes through Gros Morne National Park | |
| Rocky Harbour | 67 | 42 | West Link (Route 430-15) - Norris Point | |
| | 70– 119 | 43– 74 | Passes through Gros Morne National Park (discontinuous) | |
| Cow Head | 110 | 68 | Main Street (Route 430-21) - Cow Head | |
| Cow Head | 113 | 70 | Cow Head Road (Route 430-21) - Cow Head | |
| Port Saunders | 217 | 135 | Port au Choix Road (Route 431-28 west) – Port Saunders, Port au Choix | |
| | 259 | 161 | Bartlett's Harbour Road (Route 430-33) - Castor River North, Bartlett's Harbour | |
| | 261 | 162 | Reefs Harbour Road (Route 430-36) - Reefs Harbour-Shoal Cove West-New Ferolle | |
| Plum Point | 275 | 171 | Route 432 east – Roddickton, Main Brook | Western terminus of Route 432 |
| Plum Point | 278 | 173 | Micheal's Drive (Route 430-37) - Brig Bay, Bird Cove | |
| Blue Cove | 282 | 175 | Pond Cove Road (Route 430-49) - Pond Cove | |
| | 291 | 181 | Forrester's Point Road (Route 430-52) - Forrester's Point, Black Duck Cove | |
| St. Barbe | 293 | 182 | St. Barbe Ferry Road (Route 430-50 north) – St. Barbe Ferry Terminal | Ferry connection to Blanc-Sablon, QC (and Labrador) and Route 510 |
| | 362 | 225 | Route 432 west – Main Brook; St. Anthony Airport | Eastern terminus of Route 432; access road into airport |
| | 391 | 243 | Route 435 north – Cook's Harbour | Southern terminus of Route 435 |
| | 403 | 250 | Route 436 north – St. Lunaire-Griquet, L'Anse aux Meadows National Historic Park | Southern terminus of Route 436 |
| | 410 | 250 | St. Anthony Bight Road (Route 430-75) - St. Anthony Bight, St. Carols, Great Brehat | |
| St. Anthony | 413 | 257 | Goose Cove Road - Goose Cove East; West Street | Northern terminus; road continues into downtown as West Street |
1.000 mi = 1.609 km; 1.000 km = 0.621 mi

== See also ==
- L'Anse aux Meadows
- List of Newfoundland and Labrador highways
- Newfoundland-Labrador fixed link
- St. Anthony, Newfoundland and Labrador
