= Great Brehat =

- Local service district / designated place
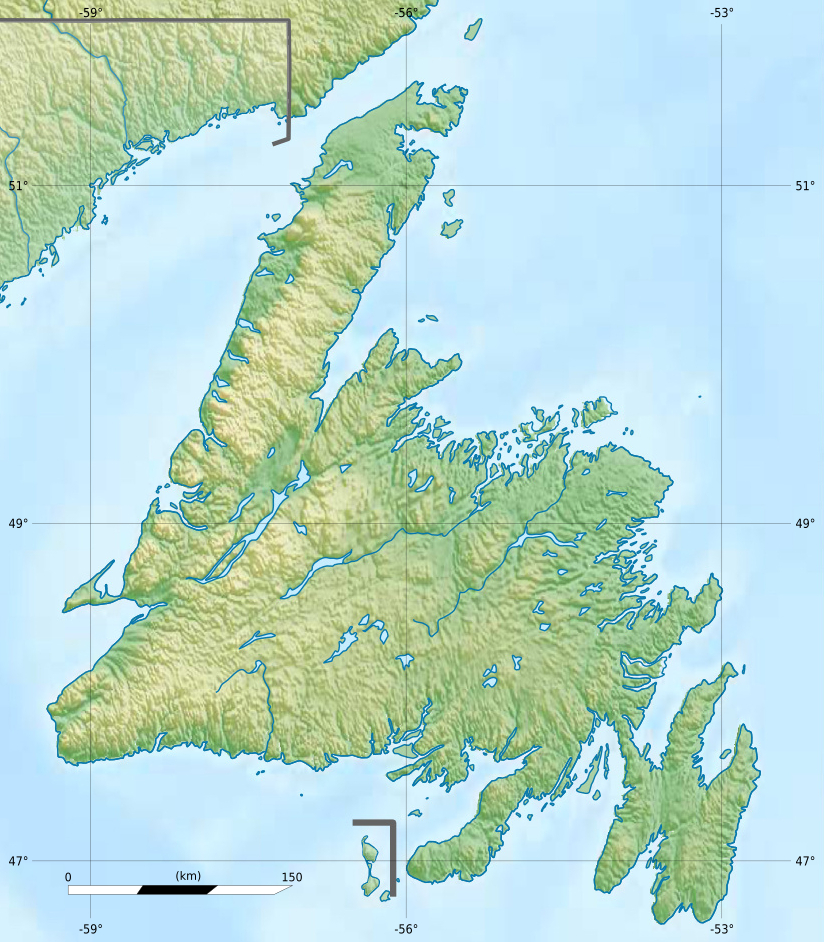
- Location of Great Brehat Great Brehat (Canada)
- Coordinates: 51°25′40″N 55°29′53″W
- Country: Canada
- Province: Newfoundland and Labrador
- Settled: 16th century

Population (2021)
  - Total: 78
- Time zone: UTC−03:30 (Newfoundland Time)
  - Summer (DST): UTC−02:30 (Newfoundland Daylight)
- Area code: 709

Great Brehat is a local service district and designated place in the Canadian province of Newfoundland and Labrador. It is on the Great Northern Peninsula of the island of Newfoundland, 10 km north of St. Anthony. As fishing has declined, the village has become a tourist attraction.

== History ==
The original settled indigenous peoples were of the Dorset culture, and the area was visited by the Vikings, as their settlement at L'Anse aux Meadows was only 46 km away. By the sixteenth century the area was occupied by the Beothuk.

When the French settled the northern peninsula ("The French Shore") of Newfoundland they established several fishing stations including Great Brehat. The people were from Brittany and named their village after an island off the Brittany coast. The exact date of the French settlement is not known. In 1713, with the Treaty of Utrecht, the French ceded the peninsula to Great Britain. Until the decline of the fishery in the 20th century, the primary catch was cod for export.

At the beginning of the 20th century, a co-operative store was opened in the village with the assistance of the medical missionary Sir Wilfred Grenfell. The first road linking the coastal communities of the area was completed in 1971, with Great Brehat being the northern terminus.

== Geography ==
Great Brehat is in Newfoundland within Subdivision D of Division No. 9. Great Brehat is located on a small bay, Great Brehat Bay, on the eastern side of the Great Northern Peninsula. Flat Point Lookout is located at the northern end of the bay. Brehat Point forms the southern boundary of the bay. The black shales in the area may yield precious metals.

== Demographics ==
As a designated place in the 2021 Census of Population conducted by Statistics Canada, Great Brehat recorded a population of 78. With a land area of 0.8 km^{2} (0.31 sq mi), it had a population density of 110.0/km^{2} (284.9/sq mi) in 2016.

== Government ==
Great Brehat is a local service district (LSD) that is governed by a committee responsible for the provision of certain services to the community. The chair of the LSD committee is Ryan Cull.

== See also ==
- L'Anse aux Meadows
- List of designated places in Newfoundland and Labrador
- List of local service districts in Newfoundland and Labrador
- St. Anthony, Newfoundland and Labrador
- Newfoundland and Labrador Route 430
