= Brig Bay =

Human settlement in Canada

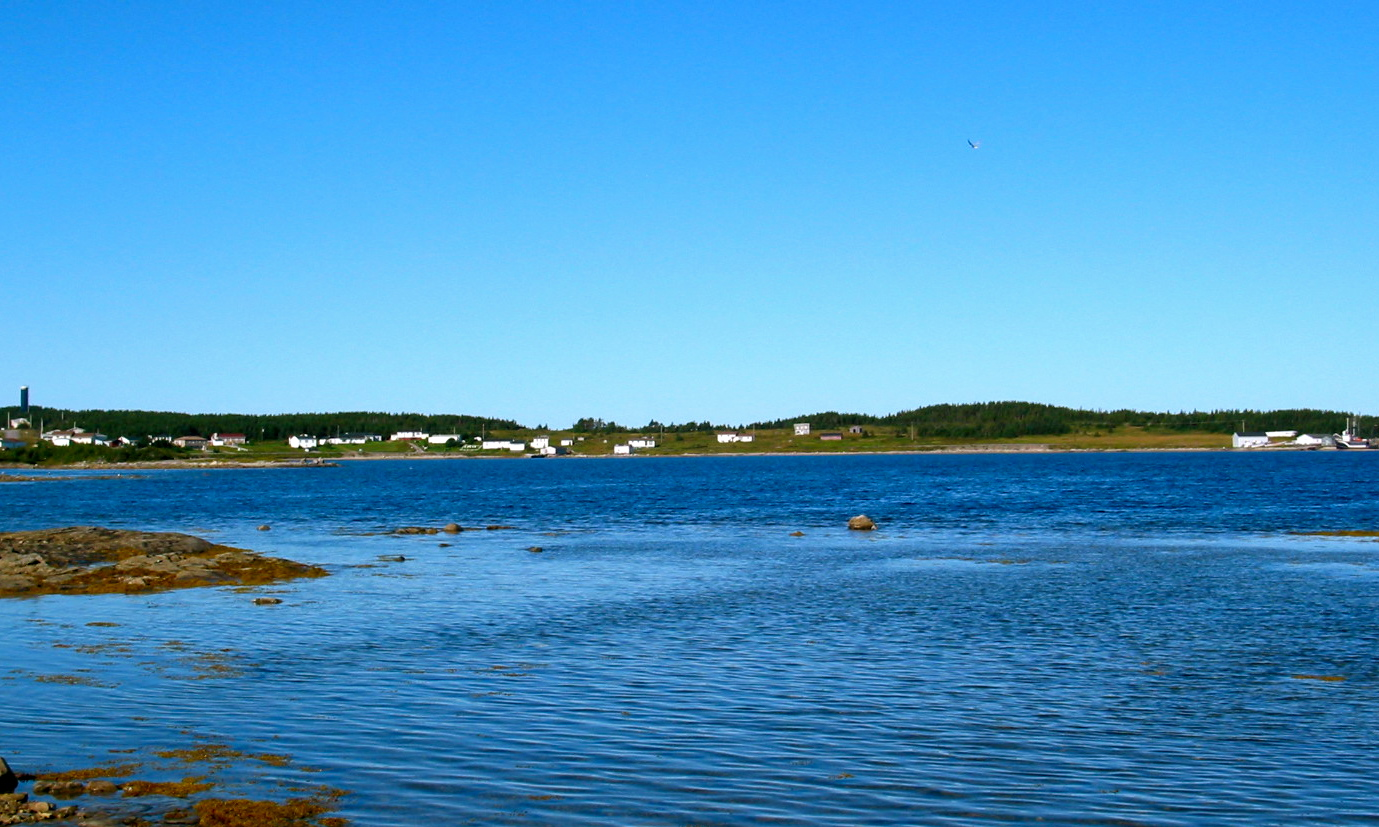
Brig Bay Harbour

Location of Brig Bay in Newfoundland and Labrador

Brig Bay is a local service district and designated place in the Canadian province of Newfoundland and Labrador. It was first mapped by Captain James Cook in September 1764. The name "Brig" was adopted by the French who occupied the bay prior to English occupation. It provided a safe and well-sheltered harbour.

== Name ==
The name Brig Bay is derived from the name "brig" for a sailing ship. In his ship's log, Captain James Cook referred to the area around today's Brig Bay and Plum Point as "Old Ferrole" when he mapped the north-west coast of Newfoundland in 1764 and 1765. The island fronting the two communities, now known as Darby's Island, is still shown on some maps as "Old Ferrole Island". The name "Ferrole" was most likely adopted by early Basque fishermen who chose a name from their mother country for the little bay. The name "Brig" was adopted by the French who occupied the bay after Basque occupation and prior to English occupation. The bay provided a safe and well-sheltered harbour for 2–3 ships the size of brigs.

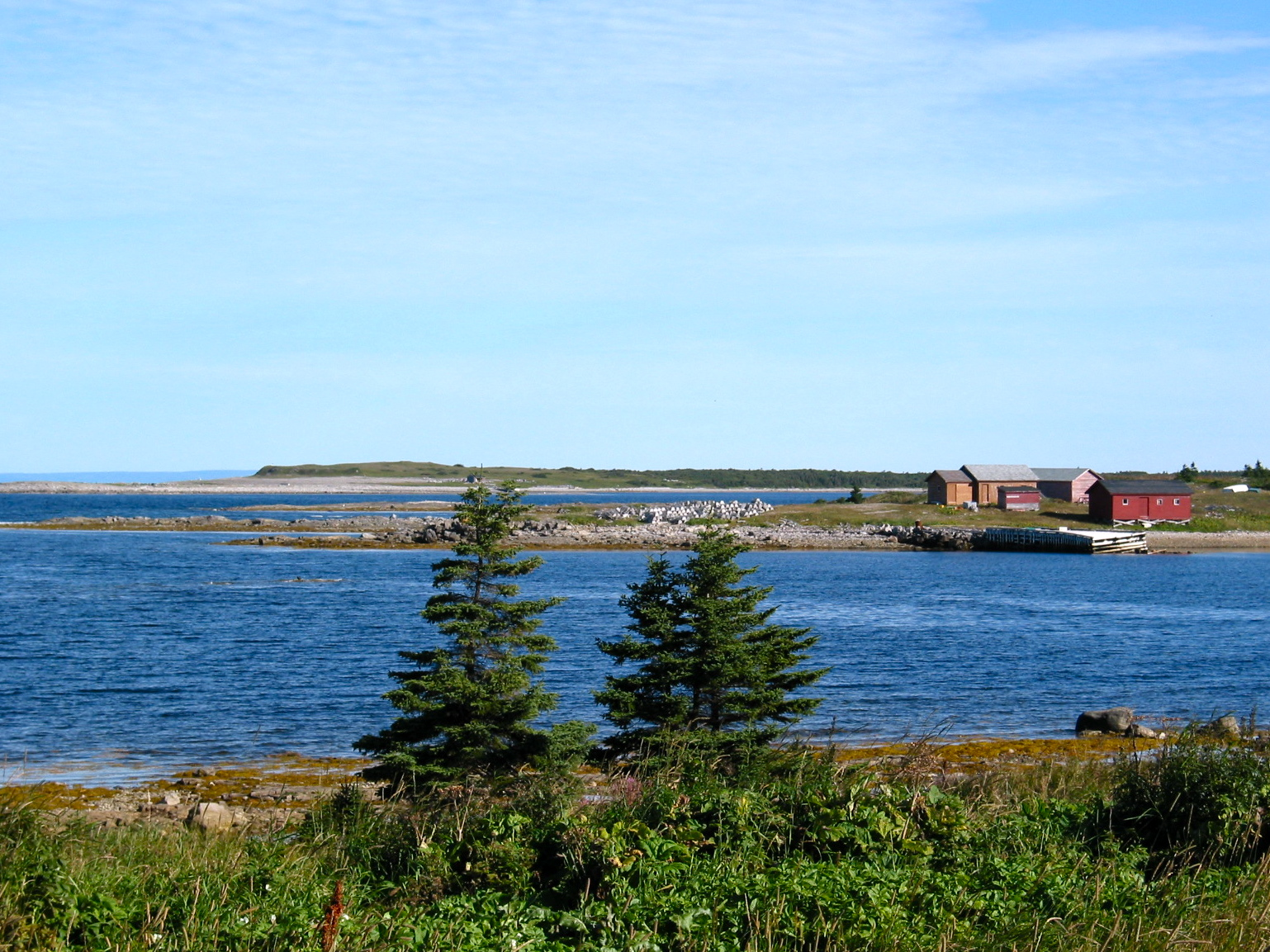
Brig Bay, looking across Morris Point to Darby's Island

== History ==
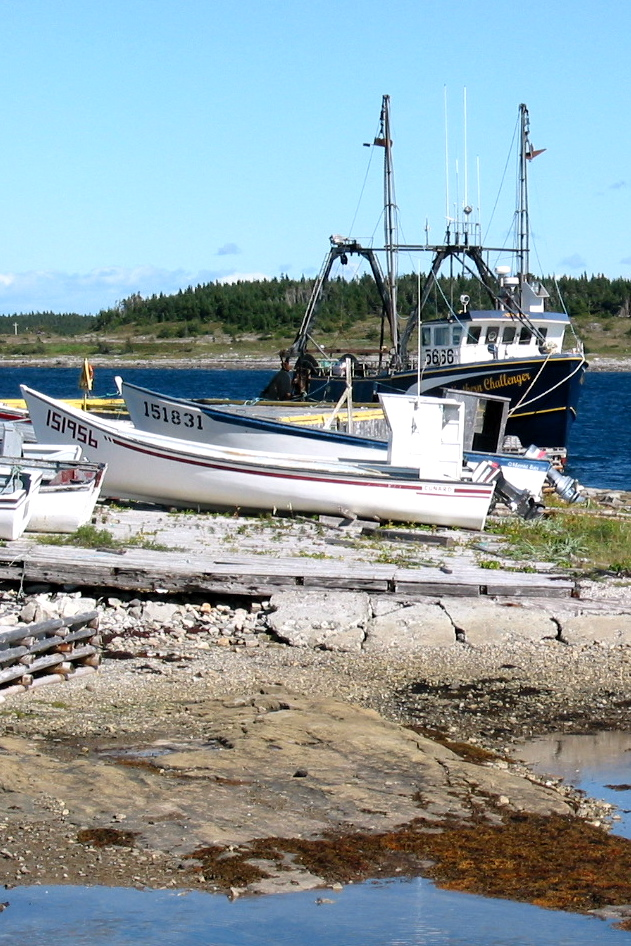

Jacques Cartier mentions the hills behind Brig Bay in his log of 1534. He referred to the two dominant hills lying to the south-west of the bay as the "granges" (barns in English). Today, these hills are known as "Doctor's Hills."

Cook first mapped Brig Bay in September 1764. He referred to Old Ferrole when describing the terrain around the geographical coordinates for modern day Brig Bay.

Cook's log indicates European fishermen were using the small bay at the time of his mapping. In his log, he mentions "fishing stages" along the shoreline but does not specify whether they were owned and occupied by French or Basque fishermen. The fishermen were likely French, as a French-owned lobster cannery (factory) was still operating at Brig Bay in the latter part of the 19th century. In his book "A History of Newfoundland", D.W. Prowse refers to the French-owned lobster factory at Brig Bay operated by a Mr. Belin in 1892. The cannery was last operated by Louis Gar(r)eau, a native of St. Malo, France.

Brig Bay was shared by the French and English/Newfoundland fishermen after the Treaty of Paris and until the turn of the 20th century.

Though the mother countries were frequently warring, their subjects were sometimes living together peacefully in Newfoundland. For instance, many of the present population of Brig Bay are the descendants of an English/Newfoundland lady, Judith House of Daniel's Harbour and Pierre (Peter) Samson of Dinan, France, who met and married at Daniel's Harbour in 1886.

When Newfoundland fishermen arrived to displace the French in the late 1890s and early 20th century they originated from the east coast of Newfoundland, some via the Bay of Islands (Wells) on the West coast. Surnames of some of the earlier settlers were Jackman, Wells, Sheppard, Allingham, Hoddinott, Spingle, Lawless, and Samson. Other families soon followed, including Cunard, and Payne; by 1945 the population had nearly doubled. Etheridge, Rogers and Brown came later.

The fishery was the mainstay industry of Brig Bay until the logging industry ramped up in the late 1920s, and both logging and fishing were the major sources of employment until the 1970s. Another significant employer through the 1950s and 1960s was a fishery co-operative, the Brig Bay CO-OP. The CO-OP acted as an agent for seal skins and salted dried cod and also operated a general store.

== Geography ==
Brig Bay is in Newfoundland within Subdivision C of Division No. 9.

Geology

Brig Bay village is built on a very thin layer of soil that overlies deep-water gray limestones. The limestones formed from silt deposited nearly 500 million years ago at the coast of the Iapetus Ocean, the precursor of today's Atlantic Ocean. Ordovician period gastropod fossils can be found in the limestones. Evidence of the last ice age that ended less than 10,000 years ago is abundant in the glacial striations found in the bedrock and the erratic granite boulders lying on the limestones. The raised beaches indicate that the land continues to rebound from the sea as a result of reducing pressure from the melted massive ice sheet that covered the land during the glacial period.

== Demographics ==
As a designated place in the 2016 Census of Population conducted by Statistics Canada, Brig Bay recorded a population of 117 living in 53 of its 71 total private dwellings, a change of 0% from its 2011 population of 117. With a land area of 1.68 km^{2} (0.65 sq mi), it had a population density of 69.6/km^{2} (180.4/sq mi) in 2016.

Religion

The primary religion in Brig Bay is Anglican. There are a few people of Pentecostal and Catholic faith. The Anglican church in Plum Point, The Church of the Advent, is shared by the Anglican population in the vicinity.

== Government ==
Brig Bay is a local service district (LSD) that is governed by a committee responsible for the provision of certain services to the community. The chair of the LSD committee is Gordon Hoddinott.

== Education ==
Brig Bay's first school was a one-room schoolhouse, St. Matthews, built by Frederick W Hoddinott, a carpenter and one of Brig Bay's earliest permanent residents. After the town outgrew the schoolhouse, it was acquired by Frederick's grandson and moved to the south-east side of the bay for use as a small movie theatre and replaced by a larger school that now serves as a community center. Teachers for St. Matthews were normally recruited from eastern Newfoundland and often married within the community and remained there. Some early teachers were Hatcher and Hounsell and later Warren, Rogers, Ludlow and Green.

== Medical services ==
Brig Bay has never had a hospital or a medical clinic. Medical services were provided by the Grenfell Mission headquartered in St. Anthony. Before the 1970s, Grenfell nurses would routinely visit the community once or twice a year to provide a rudimentary medical service to the inhabitants. Well-known nurses were Miss Ross and Miss Foukes, both British. Today medical services are available at clinics in Port Saunders or Flowers Cove.

== Travel ==
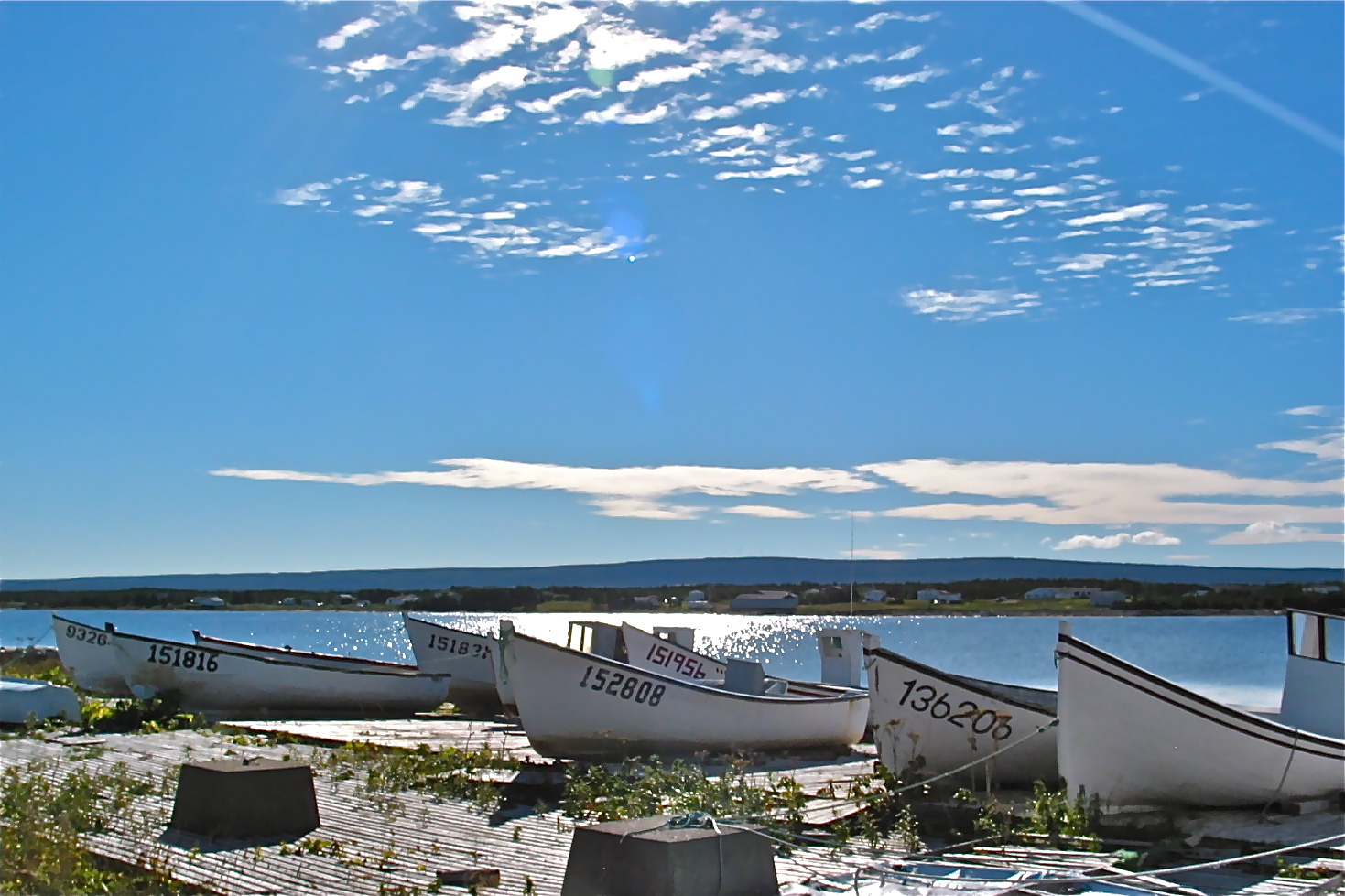

Travelers by air fly into the airport at Deer Lake, then take the "Viking Trail" (Hwy 430) north to Brig Bay. This route takes visitors through Gros Morne National Park.

== See also ==
- List of communities in Newfoundland and Labrador
- List of designated places in Newfoundland and Labrador
- List of local service districts in Newfoundland and Labrador
