= Savage Cove =

Savage Cove Anse aux Sauvages Poverty Cove
- Unincorporated community
- Location of Savage Cove-Sandy Cove in Newfoundland
- Coordinates: 51°20′11.92″N 56°41′20.16″W
- Country: Canada
- Province: Newfoundland and Labrador
- Settled: 1830s
- Incorporated: 1996

Population (2006)
  - Total: 133
- Time zone: UTC-3:30 (Newfoundland Time)
  - Summer (DST): UTC-2:30 (Newfoundland Daylight)
- Area code: 709
- Highways: Route 430

Savage Cove is a community located on the Great Northern Peninsula, north of Flower's Cove on the coast of the Strait of Belle Isle. Savage Cove is the most northerly sheltered harbour in the straits on the island of Newfoundland. In 1996, Savage Cove and nearby Sandy Cove were officially consolidated into the Town of Savage Cove - Sandy Cove.

== History ==
Being on what was known as the French Shore of Newfoundland, Savage Cove had first been used as a French staging harbour in the early 18th century. Once dubbed Anse aux Sauvages (Cove of Savages) by French seamen who had most likely encountered a Beothuk settlement in the area, the harbour was permanently settled in the 1830s by an English seaman named George Gaulton. The English seamen of the time had come to know the harbour as Savage Cove. The English name was finalized after the French relinquished their rights to the area in 1904 under the Entente cordiale. Nearby Sandy Cove was settled by Thomas White and George Coles of Devonshire, England along with the former's wife Ann Gould of Anchor Point in 1843. They were hired by the French to protect French possessions on the shore during the winter. Up until the early 20th century, Sandy Cove was initially known only as Poverty Cove. It was eventually renamed for the unusual presence of a small amount sand found on the shore near its wharf.

For years the dominant industries were that of the cod and lobster fisheries. The Canadian Saltfish Corporation had built a processing facility in the area making Savage Cove the focus of long liners who would conduct their fishing in the straits on the Labrador side. When moratoriums on the cod fishery began to take hold in the 1980s and 1990s, the major saltfish plant was forced to close and these long liners began to focus on the scallop fishery.

In the 1970s, an area near Savage Cove was slated to be the site of an undersea tunneling operation called the Newfoundland-Labrador fixed link meant to link the island of Newfoundland with neighbouring Labrador. However, the project was cancelled in 1975 with very little accomplished. Remnants of this operation, including discarded boring equipment, remain on site to this day.

In 1996, Savage Cove and Sandy Cove were officially consolidated as per the Newfoundland and Labrador House of Assembly.

== Present ==
With the demise of the cod fishery, Savage Cove, as well as many other neighbouring communities, are suffering financially. The towns' population's has been steadily decreasing as residents leave their homes for better job opportunities elsewhere. However, a fish plant in Sandy Cove is still operating and serving neighbouring communities. Also, various industries still function such as the shrimp and lobster fisheries, as well as other available smaller fisheries and fur trading.

=== Census ===
Year	Population
1996	524
2001	441
2006	442
2011	443
2016	404

== See also ==
- List of cities and towns in Newfoundland and Labrador
