= Forresters Point, Newfoundland and Labrador =

Forresters Point
- Local service district / designated place
- Location of Forresters Point Forresters Point (Canada)
- Coordinates: 51.181°N 56.799°W
- Country: Canada
- Province: Newfoundland and Labrador
- Region: Newfoundland
- Census division: 9
- Census subdivision: C

Government
  - Type: Unincorporated

Area
  - Land: 2.43 km^{2} (0.94 sq mi)

Population (2021)
  - Total: 207
  - Density: 85.3/km^{2} (221/sq mi)
- Time zone: UTC−03:30 (NST)
  - Summer (DST): UTC−02:30 (NDT)
- Area code: 709

Forresters Point is a local service district and designated place in the Canadian province of Newfoundland and Labrador. Located off Newfoundland and Labrador Route 430, just north of Pound Cove. Traditionally a fishing community, its general store has served residents since 1938.

== Geography ==
Forresters Point is in Newfoundland within Subdivision C of Division No. 9.

== Demographics ==
As a designated place in the 2021 Census of Population conducted by Statistics Canada, Forresters Point recorded a population of 207, with 84 of its 90 private dwellings occupied by usual residents. Its population decreased by 1 person from 2016 to 2021. With a land area of 2.43 km^{2} (0.94 sq mi), it had a population density of 85.2/km^{2} (220.6/sq mi) in 2021.

== Government ==
Forresters Point is a local service district (LSD) that is governed by a committee responsible for the provision of certain services to the community. The chair of the LSD committee is Gloria Barrett.

== See also ==
- List of communities in Newfoundland and Labrador
- List of designated places in Newfoundland and Labrador
- List of local service districts in Newfoundland and Labrador
