= Three Mile Rock =

- Community
- Location of Three Mile Rock in Newfoundland
- Coordinates: 50°0′23″N 57°44′10″W
- Country: Canada
- Province: Newfoundland and Labrador

Population (2021)
  - Total: 80
- Time zone: UTC-3:30 (Newfoundland Time Zone)
  - Summer (DST): UTC-2:30 (Newfoundland Daylight)
- Area code: 709
- Highways: Route 430

Three Mile Rock is a community located near Parson's Pond on Newfoundland's Great Northern Peninsula. Although the community maintains its own identity and is marked by its own exit sign on Route 430, Three Mile Rock depends on Parson's Pond for most community services and facilities.

Three Mile Rock's first settler was Samuel C Payne, who remained in the area throughout his life and is now buried in Parson's Pond Church of England Cemetery. The name of Three Mile Rock comes from a local landmark known as "The Big Rock" which sits approximately 3 miles to the south of Parson's Pond. Today, the community serves as a rest stop for residents and tourists.

== In popular culture ==
Three Mile Rock is referenced in the Stan Rogers song "The Mary Ellen Carter" as the wrecking place of the titular vessel.

== See also ==
- List of communities in Newfoundland and Labrador
