= Sacred Bay =

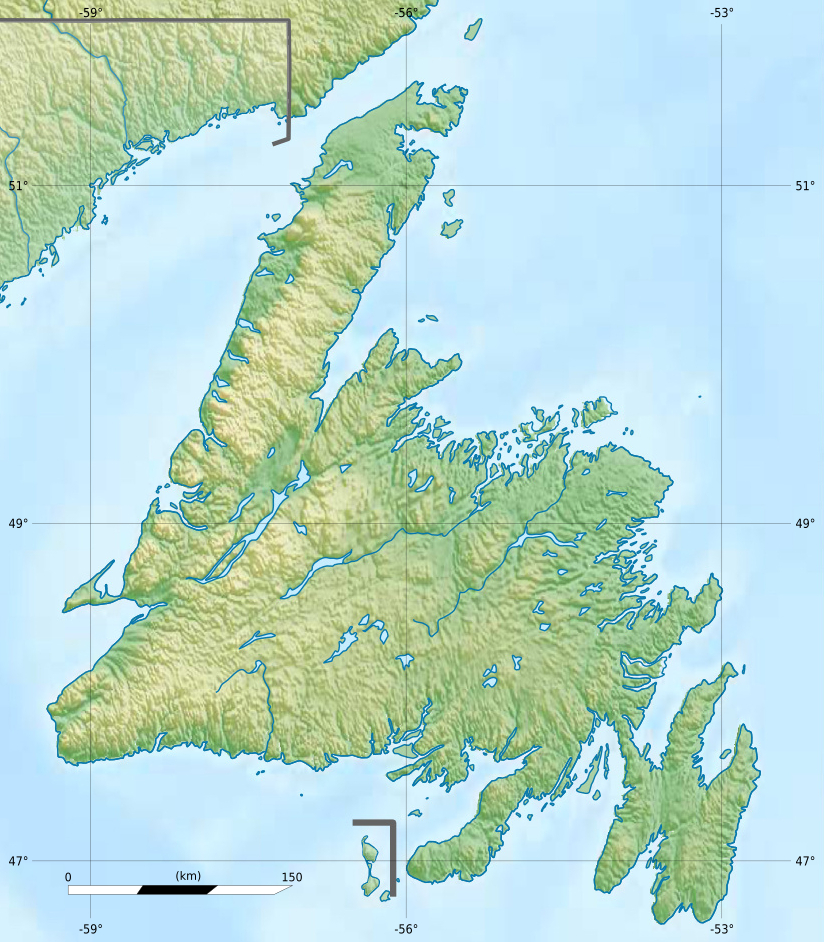
- Location of Sacred Bay in Newfoundland
- Location: Newfoundland
- Coordinates: 51°36′20″N 55°34′58″W
- Type: bay
- Etymology: from French Baie de Sacre
- Max. width: 3 miles (4.8 km)
- Max. depth: 3 miles (4.8 km)

Sacred Bay is a natural bay at the northern tip of the Great Northern Peninsula of the island of Newfoundland, in the province of Newfoundland and Labrador, Canada.

== History ==
James Cook documented the bay in his Newfoundland charts, published between 1765 and 1768.

== Landmarks ==
The bay contains Album Rock, a large boulder whose name arose when French sailors in the 1850s who painted the word "Album" on it and the event photographed by marine and photographer Paul-Émile Miot. The photograph is titled Rocher peint par les marins français (Rock painted by French sailors). The name is still used and is described in local information panels as of 2021.
