= Division No. 9, Newfoundland and Labrador =

Census division in Canada

Division No. 9
- Census division
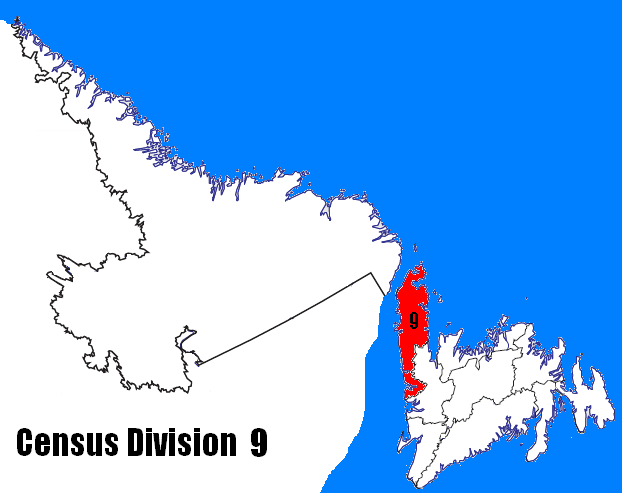
- Coordinates: 50°20′00″N 57°31′54″W
- Country: Canada
- Province: Newfoundland and Labrador

Area
  - Total: 13,209.48 km^{2} (5,100.21 sq mi)
- As of 2021

Population (2021)
  - Total: 14,733
  - Density: 1.1153/km^{2} (2.8887/sq mi)

Census Division No. 9 is composed of the area of the province of Newfoundland and Labrador called the Northern Peninsula. It has a land area of 13,527.12 km² (5,222.85 sq mi) and had a population of 15,607 at the 2016 census. The largest community is the town of St. Anthony, near its northern tip, on the Atlantic Ocean coast.

It includes most of the Great Northern Peninsula, along with Gros Morne National Park.

Historical populations Division No. 9, NL
Year	Pop.	±%
1951	17,051	—
1961	21,710	+27.3%
1971	23,140	+6.6%
1976	24,965	+7.9%
1981	25,738	+3.1%
1986	25,954	+0.8%
1991	25,022	−3.6%
1996	22,855	−8.7%
2001	20,091	−12.1%
2006	18,084	−10.0%
2011	16,786	−7.2%
2016	15,607	−7.0%
2021	14,733	−5.6%

== Demographics ==
In the 2021 Census of Population conducted by Statistics Canada, Division No. 9 had a population of 14,733 living in 6,640 of its 9,366 total private dwellings, a change of −5.6% from its 2016 population of 15,607. With a land area of 13,209.48 km^{2} (5,100.21 sq mi), it had a population density of 1.1/km^{2} (2.9/sq mi) in 2021.

== Towns ==
Name	2016 Census of Population				
Name	Population (2016)	Population (2011)	Change	Land area (km²)	Population density
Anchor Point	314	326	-3.7%	2.41	130.2/km^{2}
Bellburns	53	62	-14.5%	7.39	7.2/km^{2}
Bird Cove	179	182	-1.6%	9.39	19.1/km^{2}
Conche	170	181	-6.1%	9.25	18.4/km^{2}
Cook's Harbour	123	176	-30.1%	1.95	63.1/km^{2}
Cow Head	418	475	-9.9%	17.84	24.0/km^{2}
Daniel's Harbour	253	265	-4.5%	8.19	30.9/km^{2}
Englee	527	583	-9.6%	28.8	18.3/km^{2}
Flower's Cove	270	308	-12.3%	7.64	35.3/km^{2}
Glenburnie-Birchy Head-Shoal Brook	224	258	-13.2%	6.57	34.1/km^{2}
Goose Cove East	174	211	-17.5%	2.69	64.7/km^{2}
Hawke's Bay	315	338	-6.8%	46.55	6.8/km^{2}
Main Brook	243	265	-8.3%	28.51	8.5/km^{2}
Norris Point	670	685	-2.2%	4.91	136.5/km^{2}
Parson's Pond	345	383	-9.9%	12.63	27.3/km^{2}
Port au Choix	789	839	-6.0%	35.61	22.2/km^{2}
Port Saunders	647	697	-3.3%	38.81	17.4/km^{2}
Raleigh	177	201	-11.9%	11.12	15.9/km^{2}
River of Ponds	215	228	-5.7%	4.69	45.8/km^{2}
Rocky Harbour	947	979	-3.3%	12.08	78.4/km^{2}
Roddickton-Bide Arm	999	1057	-5.5%	47.85	20.9/km^{2}
Sally's Cove	20	27	-25.9%	4.54	4.4/km^{2}
St. Anthony	2258	2418	-6.6%	37.02	61.0/km^{2}
St. Lunaire-Griquet	604	661	-8.6%	16.68	36.2/km^{2}
St. Pauls	238	258	-7.8%	5.35	44.5/km^{2}
Trout River	552	576	-4.2%	5.91	93.4/km^{2}
Woody Point	282	281	+0.4%	2.91	96.9/km^{2}

== Unorganized subdivisions ==
- Subdivision A (Includes: Wiltondale, Lomond, Green Point)
- Subdivision C (Includes: Plum Point, St. Barbe, Savage Cove)
- Subdivision D (Includes: Ship Cove, Straitsview, Great Brehat)
- Subdivision F (Includes: Croque, Williamsport, Grandois)
- Subdivision G (Includes: Eddies Cove West, Barr'd Harbour)
- Subdivision H (Includes: Three Mile Rock, Portland Creek, Shallow Bay)

== Sources ==
- "Division No. 9, Newfoundland and Labrador (Code 1009) Census Profile". 2011 census. Government of Canada - Statistics Canada.
