= Hare Bay =

Hare Bay may refer to:

- Hare Bay, Newfoundland and Labrador, a town on Newfoundland's Bonavista Peninsula
- Hare Bay (Newfoundland and Labrador), a bay in the Great Northern Peninsula of Newfoundland
- Hare Bay (New South Wales), a bay on the east coast of Australia, part of Jervis Bay
