= Bellburns =

- Town
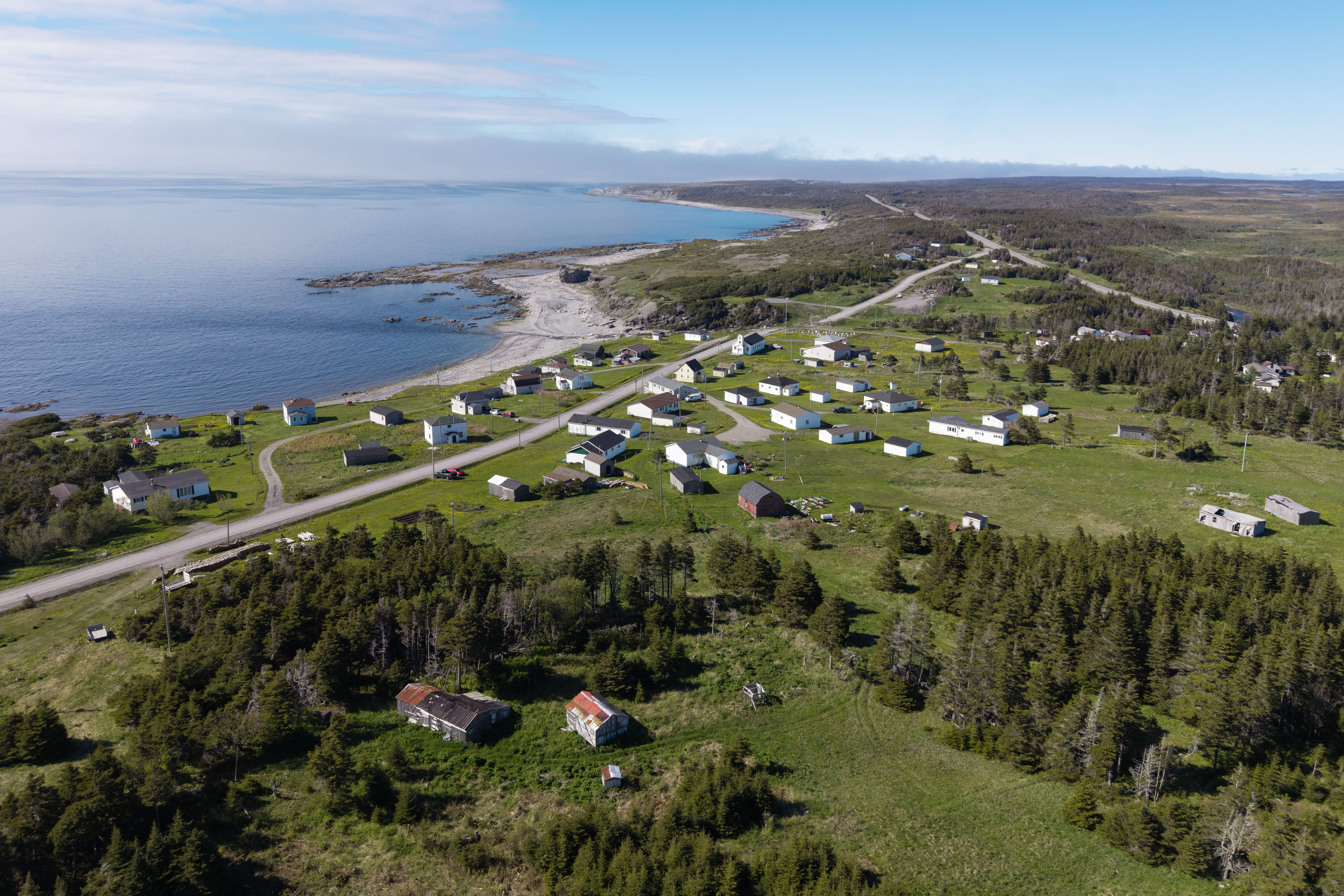

- Location of Bellburns in Newfoundland
- Coordinates: 50°20′01.23″N 57°31′56.32″W
- Country: Canada
- Province: Newfoundland and Labrador

Government
  - Mayor: Andrew Stephens

Area
  - Land: 7.39 km^{2} (2.85 sq mi)

Population (2021)
  - Total: 52
- Time zone: UTC-3:30 (Newfoundland Time)
  - Summer (DST): UTC-2:30 (Newfoundland Daylight)
- Area code: 709
- Highways: Route 430

Bellburns is a fishing settlement in the Canadian province of Newfoundland and Labrador. The town holds strong economic ties with the two closest towns Daniels Harbour and Portland Creek.

== Demographics ==
In the 2021 Census of Population conducted by Statistics Canada, Bellburns had a population of 52 living in 29 of its 41 total private dwellings, a change of −1.9% from its 2016 population of 53. With a land area of 8.83 km^{2} (3.41 sq mi), it had a population density of 5.9/km^{2} (15.3/sq mi) in 2021.

== See also ==
- List of cities and towns in Newfoundland and Labrador
