= Castor River South, Newfoundland and Labrador =

Castor River South
- Local service district / designated place
- Location of Castor River South Castor River South (Canada)
- Coordinates: 50.938°N 56.956°W
- Country: Canada
- Province: Newfoundland and Labrador
- Region: Newfoundland
- Census division: 9
- Census subdivision: C

Government
  - Type: Unincorporated

Area
  - Land: 6.81 km^{2} (2.63 sq mi)

Population (2016)
  - Total: 136
- Time zone: UTC−03:30 (NST)
  - Summer (DST): UTC−02:30 (NDT)
- Area code: 709

Castor River South is a local service district and designated place in the Canadian province of Newfoundland and Labrador.

== Geography ==
Castor River South is in Newfoundland within Subdivision C of Division No. 9.

== Demographics ==
As a designated place in the 2016 Census of Population conducted by Statistics Canada, Castor River South recorded a population of 136 living in 50 of its 56 total private dwellings, a change of −3.5% from its 2011 population of 141. With a land area of 6.81 km^{2} (2.63 sq mi), it had a population density of 20.0/km^{2} (51.7/sq mi) in 2016.

== Government ==
Castor River South is a local service district (LSD) that is governed by a committee responsible for the provision of certain services to the community. The chair of the LSD committee is Gerard Rumbolt.

== See also ==
- List of communities in Newfoundland and Labrador
- List of designated places in Newfoundland and Labrador
- List of local service districts in Newfoundland and Labrador
