= Black Duck Cove, Great Northern Peninsula, Newfoundland and Labrador =

Settlement in Newfoundland and Labrador, Canada

Coordinates: 51°11′45″N 56°47′45″W

Location of Black Duck Cove in Newfoundland and Labrador

Black Duck Cove is a local service district and designated place in the Canadian province of Newfoundland and Labrador. It is on the Great Northern Peninsula of Newfoundland.

== Geography ==
Black Duck Cove, Northern Peninsula is in Newfoundland within Subdivision C of Division No. 9.

== Demographics ==
As a designated place in the 2016 Census of Population conducted by Statistics Canada, Black Duck Cove, Northern Peninsula recorded a population of 155 living in 64 of its 68 total private dwellings, a change of -13.4% from its 2011 population of 179. With a land area of 1.4 km^{2} (0.54 sq mi), it had a population density of 110.7/km^{2} (286.7/sq mi) in 2016.

== Government ==
Black Duck Cove is a local service district (LSD) that is governed by a committee responsible for the provision of certain services to the community. The chair of the LSD committee is Misty Williams.

== See also ==
- List of communities in Newfoundland and Labrador
- List of designated places in Newfoundland and Labrador
- List of local service districts in Newfoundland and Labrador
