= Sally's Cove =

- Town
- Sally's Cove in 2026

- Location of Sally's Cove in Newfoundland
- Coordinates: 49°43′26″N 57°55′52″W
- Country: Canada
- Province: Newfoundland and Labrador

Population (2021)
  - Total: 15
- Time zone: UTC-3:30 (Newfoundland Time)
  - Summer (DST): UTC-2:30 (Newfoundland Daylight)
- Area code: 709
- Highways: Route 430

Sally's Cove is a town in the Canadian province of Newfoundland and Labrador. It is located on the west coast of the island of Newfoundland, and is surrounded by Gros Morne National Park. The town had a population of 15 in the Canada 2021 Census.

== Demographics ==
In the 2021 Census of Population conducted by Statistics Canada, Sally's Cove had a population of 15 living in 10 of its 29 total private dwellings, a change of −25% from its 2016 population of 20. With a land area of 4.61 km^{2} (1.78 sq mi), it had a population density of 3.3/km^{2} (8.4/sq mi) in 2021.

== See also ==
- List of cities and towns in Newfoundland and Labrador
