= Bartlett's Harbour =

Human settlement in Newfoundland, Canada

Coordinates: 50.943°N 56.992°W

Bartlett's Harbour is a local service district and designated place in the Canadian province of Newfoundland and Labrador that is northeast of Pointe Riche on the island of Newfoundland. There was a lobster packing establishment and the Reid-Newfoundland Steamers called weekly by 1911. The village became a Canadian Post Office in 1949, on April 1. It was served by the C.N.R Express after June 1953. It had a population of 50 in 1911, 57 by 1940, 106 in 1951 and 146 in 1956.

== Geography ==
Bartletts Harbour is in Newfoundland within Subdivision C of Division No. 9.

== Demographics ==
As a designated place in the 2016 Census of Population conducted by Statistics Canada, Bartletts Harbour recorded a population of 129 living in 48 of its 56 total private dwellings, a change of −0.8% from its 2011 population of 130. With a land area of 7.07 km^{2} (2.73 sq mi), it had a population density of 18.2/km^{2} (47.3/sq mi) in 2016.

== Government ==
Bartletts Harbour is a local service district (LSD) that is governed by a committee responsible for the provision of certain services to the community. The chair of the LSD committee is Lyman Caines.

== See also ==
- List of communities in Newfoundland and Labrador
- List of designated places in Newfoundland and Labrador
- List of local service districts in Newfoundland and Labrador
