= Bird Cove =

- Town
- Location of Bird Cove in Newfoundland
- Coordinates: 51°03′07.13″N 56°55′52.31″W
- Country: Canada
- Province: Newfoundland and Labrador

Government
  - Mayor: Nadine Caines Gould (2021-Present)

Population (2021)
  - Total: 175
- Time zone: UTC-3:30 (Newfoundland Time)
  - Summer (DST): UTC-2:30 (Newfoundland Daylight)
- Area code: 709
- Website: birdcove.ca

Bird Cove is a town in the Canadian province of Newfoundland and Labrador.

== History ==
Bird Cove was founded in 1873 by Michael Meaney and his family and was officially incorporated as a municipality on April 18, 1977. In the past, the inhabitants primarily made their living from fishing (lobster, cod, herring). The discovery of numerous archaeological sites in the 1990s led to the development of tourism. A total of 38 sites have been identified, including a significant Maritime Archaic settlement dating back to around 4350 BC. The 50 Centuries Interpretation Centre was established to showcase these finds.

== Demographics ==
In the 2021 Census of Population conducted by Statistics Canada, Bird Cove had a population of 175 living in 81 of its 88 total private dwellings, a change of −2.2% from its 2016 population of 179. With a land area of 7.69 km^{2} (2.97 sq mi), it had a population density of 22.8/km^{2} (58.9/sq mi) in 2021.

== See also ==
- List of cities and towns in Newfoundland and Labrador
- Newfoundland and Labrador Route 430
