= Castor River North =

Local service district / designated place in Newfoundland and Labrador, Canada

Coordinates: 50.933°N 56.960°W

Location of Castor River North in Newfoundland and Labrador

Castor River North is a local service district and designated place in the Canadian province of Newfoundland and Labrador.

== Geography ==
Castor River North is in Newfoundland within Subdivision C of Division No. 9.

== Demographics ==
As a designated place in the 2016 Census of Population conducted by Statistics Canada, Castor River North recorded a population of 141 living in 55 of its 57 total private dwellings, a change of -7.8% from its 2011 population of 153. With a land area of 2.34 km^{2} (0.90 sq mi), it had a population density of 60.3/km^{2} (156.1/sq mi) in 2016.

== Government ==
Castor River North is a local service district (LSD) that is governed by a committee responsible for the provision of certain services to the community. The chair of the LSD committee is Stanley Tatchell.

== See also ==
- List of communities in Newfoundland and Labrador
- List of designated places in Newfoundland and Labrador
- List of local service districts in Newfoundland and Labrador
