= St. Anthony Bight =

Local service district and designated place in Newfoundland and Labrador, Canada

Coordinates: 51.380°N 55.543°W

Location of St. Anthony Bight in Newfoundland and Labrador

St. Anthony Bight is a local service district and designated place in the Canadian province of Newfoundland and Labrador.

== Geography ==
St. Anthony Bight is in Newfoundland within Subdivision D of Division No. 9.

== Demographics ==
As a designated place in the 2016 Census of Population conducted by Statistics Canada, St. Anthony Bight recorded a population of 120 living in 54 of its 57 total private dwellings, a change of -6.3% from its 2011 population of 128. With a land area of 2.33 km^{2} (0.90 sq mi), it had a population density of 51.5/km^{2} (133.4/sq mi) in 2016.

== Government ==
St. Anthony Bight is a local service district (LSD) that is governed by a committee responsible for the provision of certain services to the community. The chair of the LSD committee is Chris Patey.

== See also ==
- List of communities in Newfoundland and Labrador
- List of designated places in Newfoundland and Labrador
- List of local service districts in Newfoundland and Labrador
