= River of Ponds =

- Town
- Location of River of Ponds in Newfoundland
- Coordinates: 50°32′N 57°23′W
- Country: Canada
- Province: Newfoundland and Labrador
- Incorporated: 1970

Population (2021)
  - Total: 173
- Time zone: UTC-3:30 (Newfoundland Time)
  - Summer (DST): UTC-2:30 (Newfoundland Daylight)
- Area code: 709
- Highways: Route 430

River of Ponds is a town located northeast of Daniel's Harbour, Newfoundland and Labrador. It became a Local Government Community in 1970 and had a population of 166 in 1956. The 2021 census reported a population of 173.

== Demographics ==
In the 2021 Census of Population conducted by Statistics Canada, River of Ponds had a population of 173 living in 85 of its 128 total private dwellings, a change of −19.5% from its 2016 population of 215. With a land area of 4.46 km^{2} (1.72 sq mi), it had a population density of 38.8/km^{2} (100.5/sq mi) in 2021.

== See also ==
- List of cities and towns in Newfoundland and Labrador
