= Green Island Cove =

- Town
- Location within Newfoundland and Labrador
- Coordinates: 51.382°N 56.577°W
- Country: Canada
- Province: Newfoundland and Labrador

Population
  - Total: 185
- Time zone: UTC-3:30 (Newfoundland Time)
  - Summer (DST): UTC-2:30 (Newfoundland Daylight)
- Highways: Route 430

Green Island Cove is a settlement in Newfoundland and Labrador. It is close to the northern tip of the Great Northern Peninsula, and its main road link to the rest of the province is Newfoundland and Labrador Route 430.
