= Pond Cove =

Settlement in Canada

Coordinates: 51°08′N 56°52′W

Pond Cove is a small settlement in Newfoundland and Labrador, Canada. It is located south of Anchor Point.

== See also ==
- List of communities in Newfoundland and Labrador
