= Hare Bay (Newfoundland and Labrador) =

Natural bay in Newfoundland and Labrador, Canada

Coordinates: 51.28°N 55.81°W

Location of Hare Bay in Newfoundland

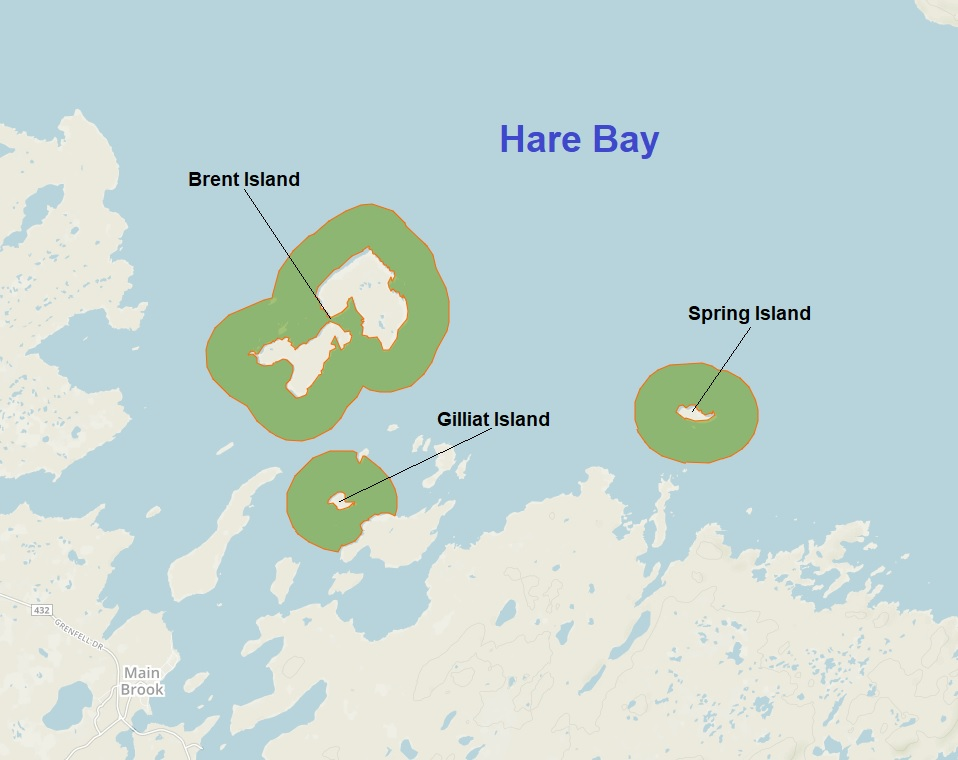
Hare Bay Islands Ecological Reserve

Hare Bay is a natural bay located on the eastern side of the Northern Peninsula of the island of Newfoundland, in the Canadian province of Newfoundland and Labrador.

Located in Hare bay is the Hare Bay Islands Ecological Reserve. The only communities located in this rather large bay are Main Brook and Goose Cove East.
