= Cow Head (town) =

Town in Newfoundland and Labrador

- Town
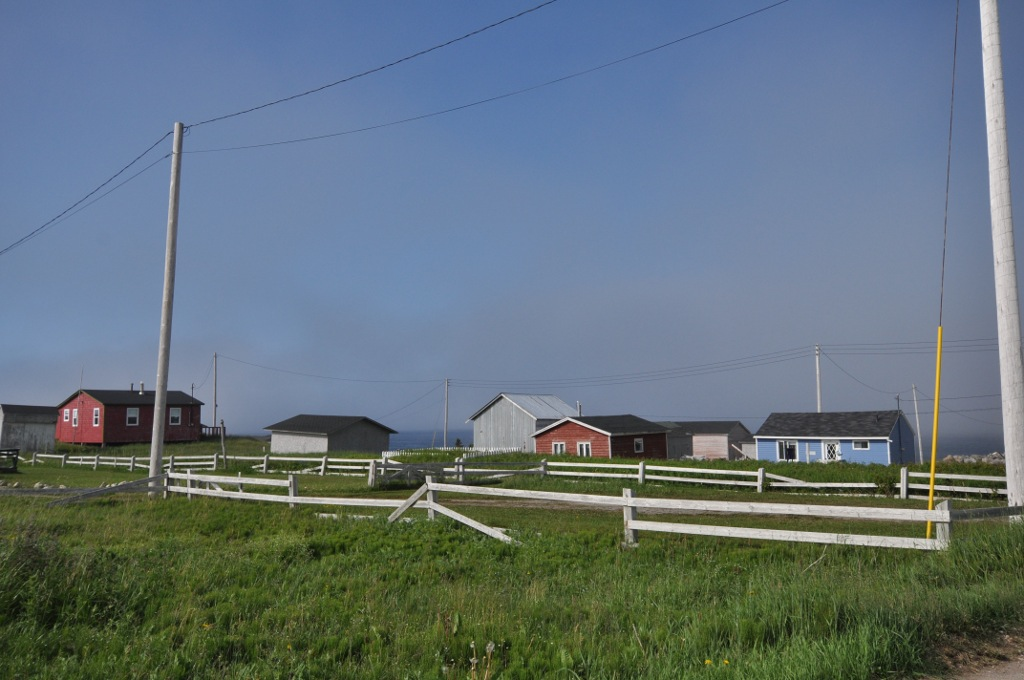

- Location of Cow Head in Newfoundland
- Coordinates: 49.9167°N 57.8°W
- Country: Canada
- Province: Newfoundland and Labrador

Area
  - Land: 17.84 km^{2} (6.89 sq mi)

Population (2021)
  - Total: 398
- Time zone: UTC-3:30 (Newfoundland Time)
  - Summer (DST): UTC-2:30 (Newfoundland Daylight)
- Area code: 709
- Highways: Route 430
- Cow Head Light
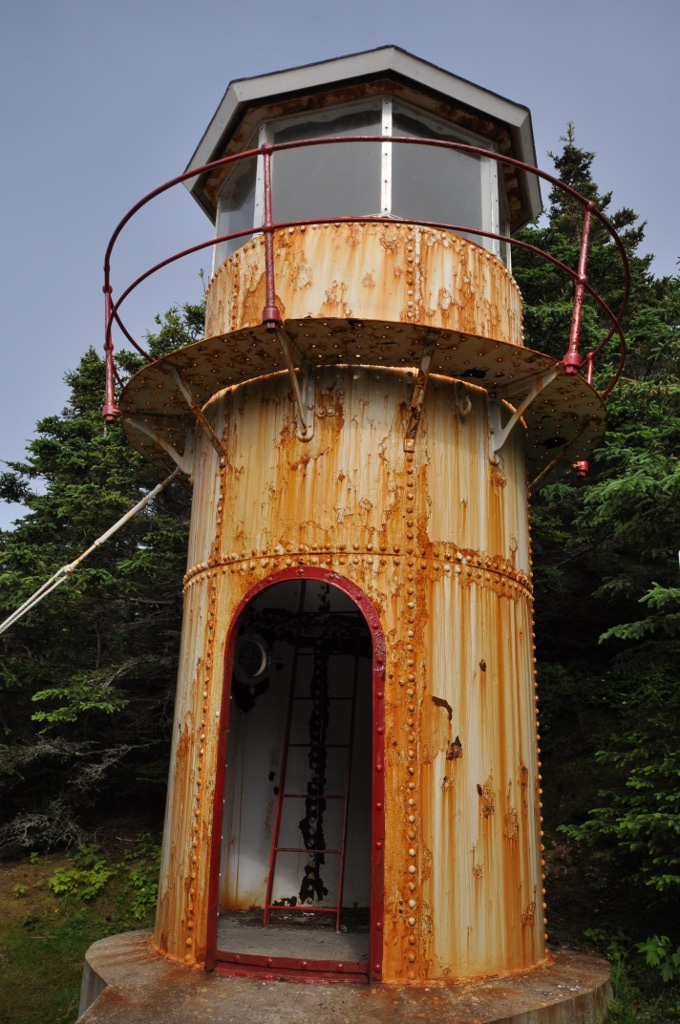
- Cow Head Lighthouse in 2013
- Coordinates: 49°55′12.28″N 57°49′31.89″W
- Constructed: 1905
- Foundation: concrete base
- Construction: cast iron tower
- Automated: 1952
- Height: 5.5 metres (18 ft)
- Shape: cylindrical tower with balcony and lantern
- Markings: white tower and lantern, red trim
- Operator: Town of Cow Head
- Heritage: municipal heritage site
- Deactivated: 1988
- Focal height: 43 metres (141 ft)
- Range: 15 nautical miles (28 km; 17 mi)
- Characteristic: F W

Cow Head is a town in Newfoundland and Labrador. The town had a population of 398 in the Canada 2021 Census.

The Dr. Henry N. Payne Community Museum (c. 1941) in Cow Head, Newfoundland and Labrador is on the Canadian Register of Historic Places.

Cow Head is home to one of the longest sandy beaches in Newfoundland as well as a large area of sand dunes. It also has panoramic views of the Long Range Mountains of Gros Morne. An interesting geologic feature found at Cow Head is a section of the former continental margin of Laurentia which dipped into the Iapetus ocean.

There is a walking trail leading to a lighthouse constructed in 1909 on the summer side or "head" of Cow Head.

== Demographics ==
In the 2021 Census of Population conducted by Statistics Canada, Cow Head had a population of 398 living in 184 of its 225 total private dwellings, a change of −7% from its 2016 population of 428. With a land area of 17.27 km^{2} (6.67 sq mi), it had a population density of 23.0/km^{2} (59.7/sq mi) in 2021.

== Arts and culture ==
Cow Head is the home to the Gros Morne Theatre Festival.

A new theatre named in honour of nurse, Myra Bennett, was completed in 2021.

== Geology ==
The Cow Head Group is made up of a series of continental slope strata that contain numerous boulders made of carbonate. These have yielded numerous trilobite fossils and have led to the identification of new species, including Catillicephala cifelli, named after paleontologist Rich Cifelli.

== Notable people ==
Jane L. Hutchings C.M.,R.N., health care, local philanthropist

== Gallery ==
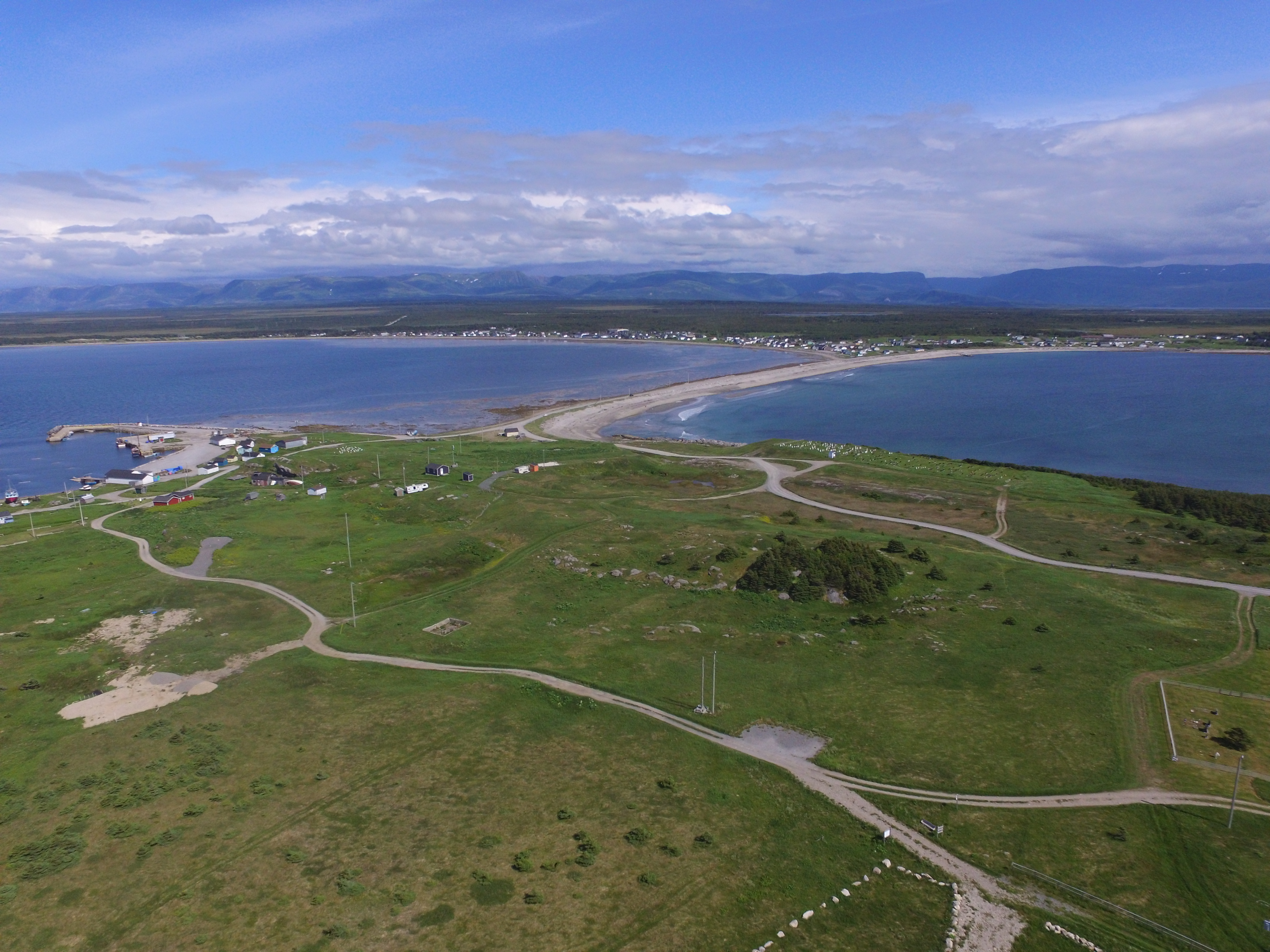
Aerial photo of the Cow Head Peninsula

Sandy beach in Cow Head, 2020

== See also ==
- List of lighthouses in Canada
- List of cities and towns in Newfoundland and Labrador
