= Blue Cove =

Settlement in Newfoundland and Labrador

Coordinates: 51.098°N 56.868°W

Location of Blue Cove in Newfoundland and Labrador

Blue Cove is a settlement in the Canadian province of Newfoundland and Labrador.
