= Hawke's Bay, Newfoundland and Labrador =

Hawke's Bay
- Town
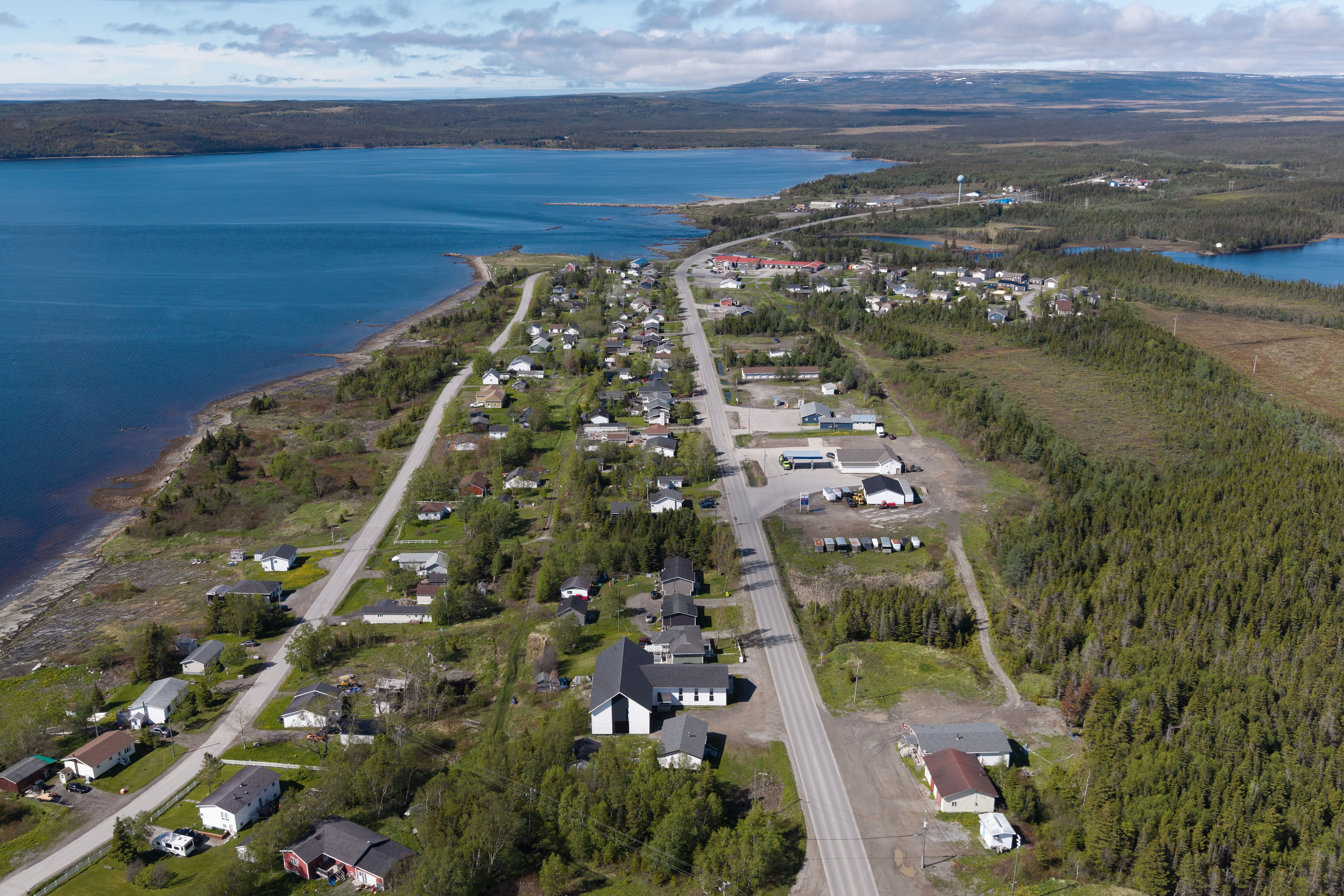

- Seal

- Location of Hawke's Bay in Newfoundland
- Coordinates: 50°36′50″N 57°10′00″W
- Country: Canada
- Province: Newfoundland and Labrador
- Settled: early 20th century

Population (2021)
  - Total: 297
- Time zone: UTC-3:30 (Newfoundland Time)
  - Summer (DST): UTC-2:30 (Newfoundland Daylight)
- Area code: 709
- Highways: Route 430

Hawke's Bay is a town at the mouth of Torrent River southeast of Point Riche in the Canadian province of Newfoundland and Labrador.

== History ==
The town was named after Edward Hawke by James Cook in 1766. This was to commemorate Hawke's victory in the Battle of Quiberon Bay in 1759. Although Hawke's Bay was used as an enclave during the early struggle for North America by both the English and French navies, it was not until the early 20th century that Michael Walsh became the first permanent settler. In 1903, a whaling station was established on the north side of the bay, but it closed the following year. Sydney Cotton ran the first airmail service in Newfoundland to Hawke's Bay. In 1933, pulpwood harvesting was established in the area by the International Pulp and Paper Company.

The first Postmistress was Miss Dorothea Desse Hoddinott who died in August 2003.

== Climate ==
Hawke's Bay has a humid continental climate (Koppen: Dfb). Summers are mild and rainy while winters are chilly and extremely snowy, with average annual snowfall totaling 360.5 cm (142 inches) . Winter typically begins during November and can last well into April, and can see nightly lows dip well below zero.

Climate data for Hawke's Bay
Month	Jan	Feb	Mar	Apr	May	Jun	Jul	Aug	Sep	Oct	Nov	Dec	Year
Record high °C (°F)	14.5 (58.1)	13.0 (55.4)	14.5 (58.1)	21.5 (70.7)	25.5 (77.9)	27.5 (81.5)	30.5 (86.9)	29.5 (85.1)	28.5 (83.3)	23.5 (74.3)	20.5 (68.9)	11.5 (52.7)	30.5 (86.9)
Mean daily maximum °C (°F)	−5.2 (22.6)	−5.2 (22.6)	−1.1 (30.0)	4.6 (40.3)	10.8 (51.4)	16.2 (61.2)	20.1 (68.2)	20.1 (68.2)	15.9 (60.6)	9.7 (49.5)	3.7 (38.7)	−1.5 (29.3)	7.4 (45.3)
Daily mean °C (°F)	−9.6 (14.7)	−10.1 (13.8)	−5.4 (22.3)	0.8 (33.4)	6.2 (43.2)	11.4 (52.5)	15.5 (59.9)	15.6 (60.1)	11.5 (52.7)	6.1 (43.0)	0.6 (33.1)	−4.8 (23.4)	3.2 (37.8)
Mean daily minimum °C (°F)	−14.0 (6.8)	−14.9 (5.2)	−9.8 (14.4)	−3.0 (26.6)	1.6 (34.9)	6.5 (43.7)	10.8 (51.4)	11.1 (52.0)	7.2 (45.0)	2.5 (36.5)	−2.5 (27.5)	−7.9 (17.8)	−1.0 (30.2)
Record low °C (°F)	−35.5 (−31.9)	−37.0 (−34.6)	−32.0 (−25.6)	−21.5 (−6.7)	−8.0 (17.6)	−1.5 (29.3)	1.5 (34.7)	1.0 (33.8)	−4.0 (24.8)	−6.0 (21.2)	−20.5 (−4.9)	−30.0 (−22.0)	−37.0 (−34.6)
Average precipitation mm (inches)	107.1 (4.22)	82.3 (3.24)	59.6 (2.35)	48.7 (1.92)	61.8 (2.43)	80.1 (3.15)	102.8 (4.05)	94.4 (3.72)	102.0 (4.02)	97.0 (3.82)	82.4 (3.24)	92.1 (3.63)	1,010.2 (39.77)
Average rainfall mm (inches)	6.8 (0.27)	6.8 (0.27)	7.9 (0.31)	20.9 (0.82)	57.4 (2.26)	79.5 (3.13)	102.8 (4.05)	94.4 (3.72)	102.2 (4.02)	94.3 (3.71)	59.8 (2.35)	17.1 (0.67)	649.7 (25.58)
Average snowfall cm (inches)	100.3 (39.5)	75.4 (29.7)	51.7 (20.4)	27.8 (10.9)	4.4 (1.7)	0.5 (0.2)	0.0 (0.0)	0.0 (0.0)	0.0 (0.0)	2.7 (1.1)	22.6 (8.9)	75.0 (29.5)	360.5 (141.9)
Source: Environment Canada

== Demographics ==
In the 2021 Census of Population conducted by Statistics Canada, Hawke's Bay had a population of 297 living in 142 of its 162 total private dwellings, a change of −5.7% from its 2016 population of 315. With a land area of 46.41 km^{2} (17.92 sq mi), it had a population density of 6.4/km^{2} (16.6/sq mi) in 2021.

== See also ==
- List of communities in Newfoundland and Labrador
