= Port Saunders =

- Town
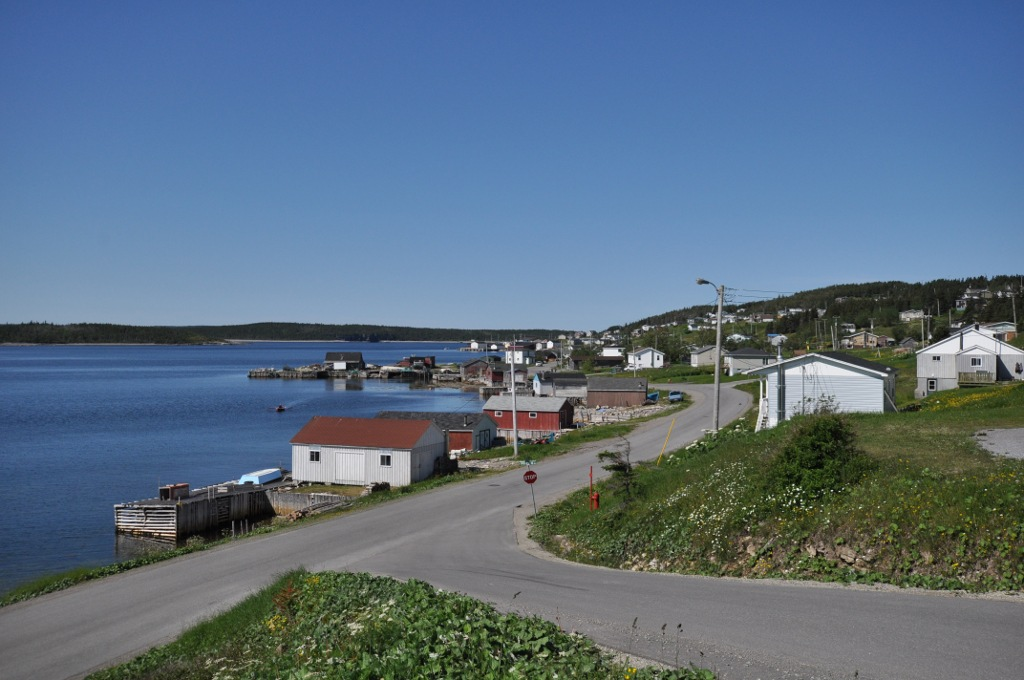

- Location of Port Saunders in Newfoundland
- Coordinates: 50°39′N 57°16′W
- Country: Canada
- Province: Newfoundland and Labrador

Population (2021)
  - Total: 678
- Time zone: UTC-3:30 (Newfoundland Time)
  - Summer (DST): UTC-2:30 (Newfoundland Daylight)
- Area code: 709
- Highways: Route 430
- Website: Port Saunders official site

Port Saunders is a community of 674 located in Newfoundland and Labrador, Canada.

== Demographics ==
In the 2021 Census of Population conducted by Statistics Canada, Port Saunders had a population of 678 living in 284 of its 319 total private dwellings, a change of 0.6% from its 2016 population of 674. With a land area of 38.5 km^{2} (14.9 sq mi), it had a population density of 17.6/km^{2} (45.6/sq mi) in 2021.

== See also ==
- List of cities and towns in Newfoundland and Labrador
