= Flower's Cove =

- Town
- Location of Flower's Cove in Newfoundland
- Coordinates: 51°17′0″N 56°44′0″W
- Country: Canada
- Province: Newfoundland and Labrador

Population (2021)
  - Total: 272
- Time zone: UTC-3:30 (Newfoundland Time)
  - Summer (DST): UTC-2:30 (Newfoundland Daylight)
- Area code: 709
- Highways: Route 430
- Flower's Cove Lighthouse
- Constructed: 1899 (first)
- Foundation: concrete base (current)
- Construction: woody tower (first) metal skeletal tower (current)
- Height: 15.5 metres (51 ft) (first); 4 metres (13 ft) (current)
- Shape: quadrangular atop the keeper’s house with balcony and lantern (first) square pyramidal skeletal tower with balcony and light (current)
- Markings: white tower (first) grey metal skeletal tower (current)
- Power source: mains electricity
- Operator: Town of Flower's Cove
- First lit: 1969 (current)
- Deactivated: 1969 (first)
- Focal height: 5 metres (16 ft) (current)
- Range: 4 nmi (7.4 km; 4.6 mi)
- Characteristic: Fl G 3s

Flower's Cove is a town in the Canadian province of Newfoundland and Labrador. The town had a population of 272 in the Canada 2021 Census. It is known for its thrombolite fossils.

== Geography ==
Climate

Flower's Cove has a subarctic climate (Koppen: Dfc) per usual of the Great Northern Peninsula. Summers are short, cool and rainy, while winters are long, very cold, and snowy, with annual snowfall averaging 109 inches (277 cm). Summer typically begins by late June and can last until the end of September. Autumn is short but cool, with highs in the mid-40s (°F) and lows in the mid-30s (°F). Winter usually begins during November, sometimes late October, and can last into May. Springs are cool and relatively dry, and typically start during May and end during June, where summer begins.

Climate data for Flowers Cove 1981 to 2010 Canadian Climate Normals station data
Month	Jan	Feb	Mar	Apr	May	Jun	Jul	Aug	Sep	Oct	Nov	Dec	Year
Record high °C (°F)	12.0 (53.6)	12.0 (53.6)	10.0 (50.0)	17.0 (62.6)	25.0 (77.0)	24.0 (75.2)	25.0 (77.0)	26.0 (78.8)	24.5 (76.1)	20.0 (68.0)	17.0 (62.6)	11.0 (51.8)	26.0 (78.8)
Mean daily maximum °C (°F)	−6.5 (20.3)	−7.0 (19.4)	−2.3 (27.9)	2.2 (36.0)	7.3 (45.1)	12.2 (54.0)	16.6 (61.9)	17.3 (63.1)	13.7 (56.7)	7.7 (45.9)	2.6 (36.7)	−2.4 (27.7)	5.1 (41.2)
Daily mean °C (°F)	−10.8 (12.6)	−11.4 (11.5)	−6.2 (20.8)	−1.0 (30.2)	3.7 (38.7)	7.9 (46.2)	12.5 (54.5)	13.4 (56.1)	9.8 (49.6)	4.4 (39.9)	−0.4 (31.3)	−5.8 (21.6)	1.3 (34.4)
Mean daily minimum °C (°F)	−15.5 (4.1)	−15.8 (3.6)	−10.2 (13.6)	−4.2 (24.4)	0.1 (32.2)	3.7 (38.7)	8.4 (47.1)	9.5 (49.1)	5.9 (42.6)	1.1 (34.0)	−3.5 (25.7)	−9.3 (15.3)	−2.5 (27.5)
Record low °C (°F)	−30.0 (−22.0)	−34.0 (−29.2)	−31.0 (−23.8)	−21.0 (−5.8)	−9.0 (15.8)	−4.0 (24.8)	−1.0 (30.2)	2.0 (35.6)	−2.0 (28.4)	−9.0 (15.8)	−18.0 (−0.4)	−29.0 (−20.2)	−34.0 (−29.2)
Average precipitation mm (inches)	87.9 (3.46)	70.8 (2.79)	71.9 (2.83)	56.4 (2.22)	76.1 (3.00)	106.5 (4.19)	107.6 (4.24)	102.3 (4.03)	99.2 (3.91)	96.5 (3.80)	79.3 (3.12)	84.7 (3.33)	1,039.2 (40.92)
Average rainfall mm (inches)	16.0 (0.63)	12.4 (0.49)	21.8 (0.86)	31.0 (1.22)	70.4 (2.77)	105.9 (4.17)	107.6 (4.24)	102.3 (4.03)	99.2 (3.91)	94.0 (3.70)	65.6 (2.58)	36.6 (1.44)	762.8 (30.04)
Average snowfall cm (inches)	72 (28)	58 (23)	50 (20)	25 (9.8)	6 (2.4)	1 (0.4)	0 (0)	0 (0)	0 (0)	3 (1.2)	14 (5.5)	48 (19)	277 (109.3)
Average precipitation days (≥ 0.2 mm)	13.2	12.4	11.4	11.2	12.7	15.1	15.1	14.6	14.6	15.5	14.3	13.8	163.9
Average rainy days (≥ 0.2 mm)	2.4	2.5	3.6	6.3	11.7	15.0	15.1	14.6	14.6	15.2	10.1	4.3	115.4
Average snowy days (≥ 0.2 cm)	11.7	10.6	8.3	4.9	1.0	0.13	0	0	0	0.48	3.9	9.5	50.51
Source: Environment Canada

== Demographics ==
In the 2021 Census of Population conducted by Statistics Canada, Flower's Cove had a population of 272 living in 119 of its 144 total private dwellings, a change of 0.7% from its 2016 population of 270. With a land area of 6.77 km^{2} (2.61 sq mi), it had a population density of 40.2/km^{2} (104.1/sq mi) in 2021.

== Sights ==
Flower's Cove is famous for thrombolites, very rare fossils which can be seen on the coast in the southern part of the town, remnants of bacteria and algae. They are about 650 million years old. The only places where thrombolites were found are Flower's Cove and Western Australia.

There are three churches in Flower's Cove, the most famous and largest of which is St. Barnabas Anglican Church. It is known as Skin Boot Church, as leather shoes were sold for the church fund when the church was built in the 1920s. Flower's Cove United Church is the smallest. It has a flèche instead of a spire.

Marjorie Bridge is a red-roofed bridge dating from the beginning of the 20th century. It is close to the Roman Catholic Church Lady of Snow, which is more than 100 years old. The church was renovated in 2007. It is a part of Our Lady of Grace Parish in Bird Cove, which belongs to the diocese of St. George.

== Gallery ==
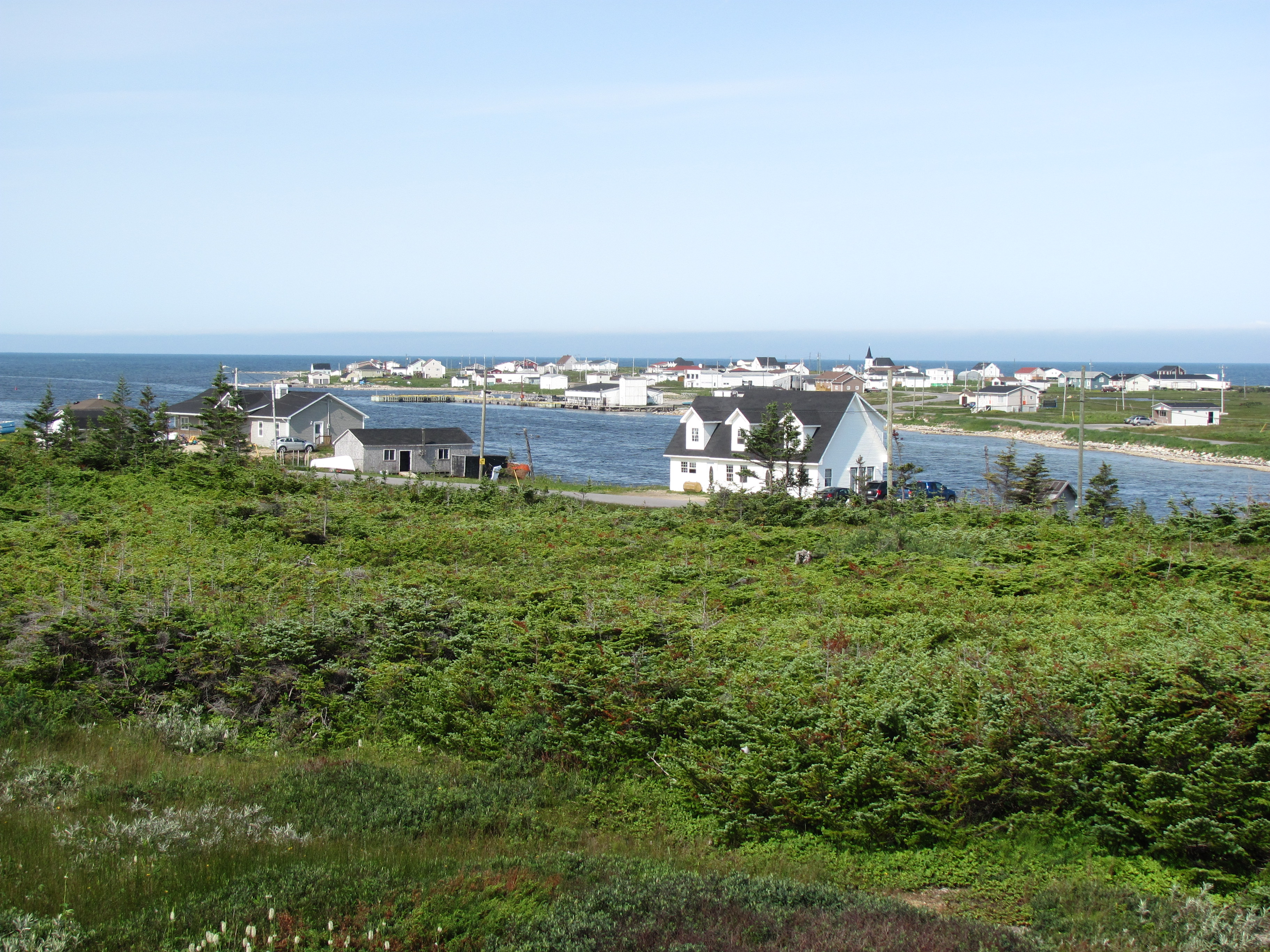
General view of the town

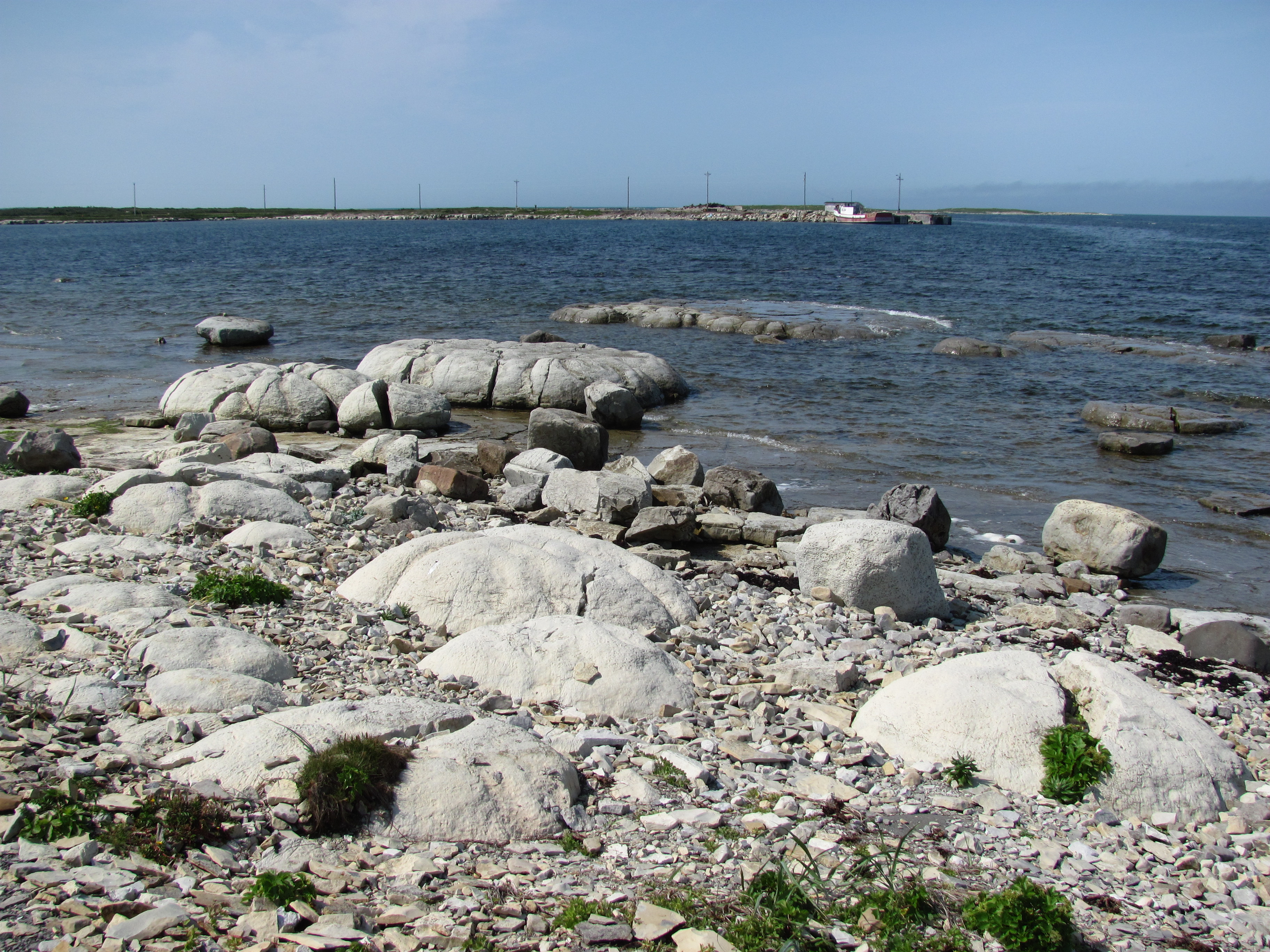
Thrombolites

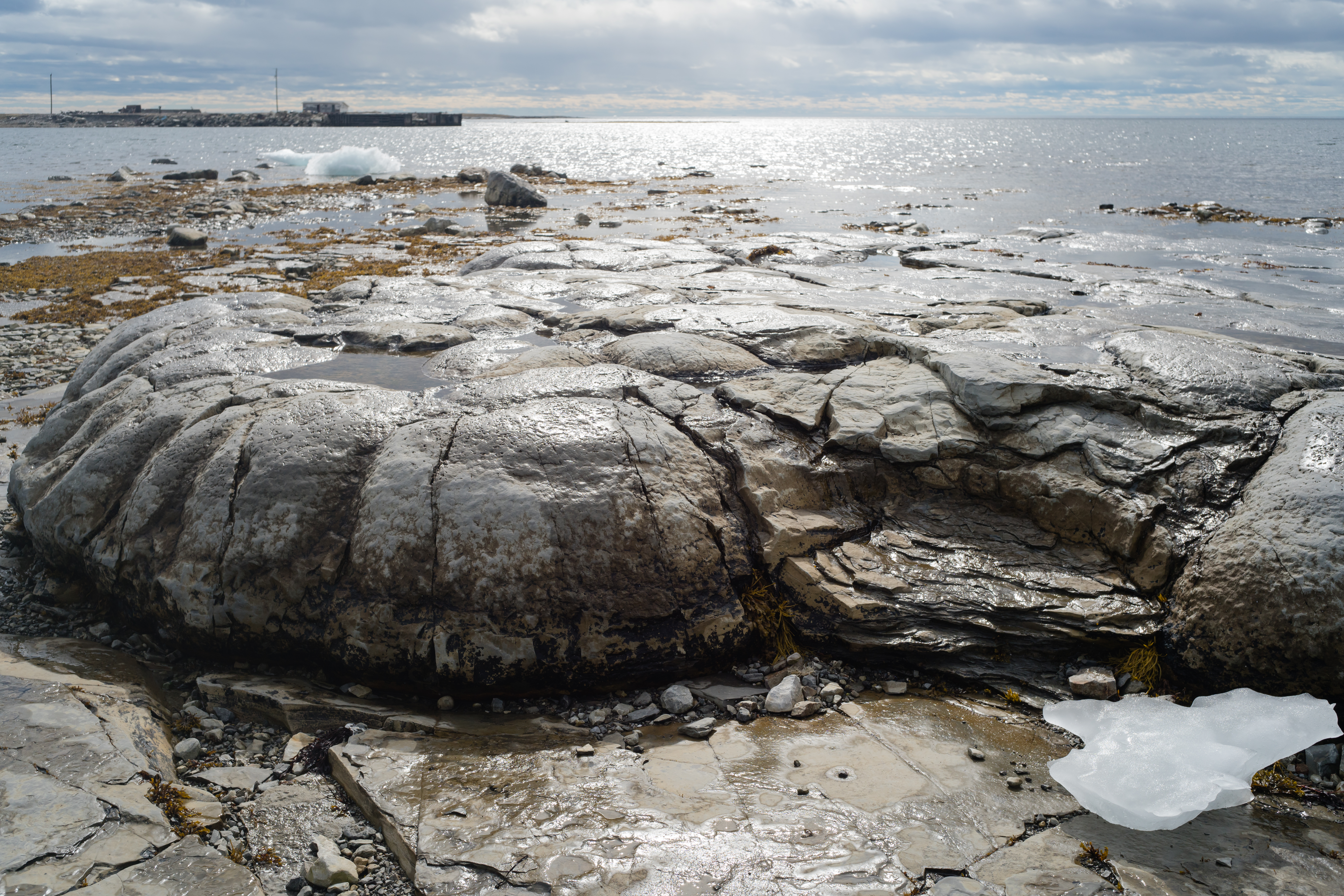
Thrombolites

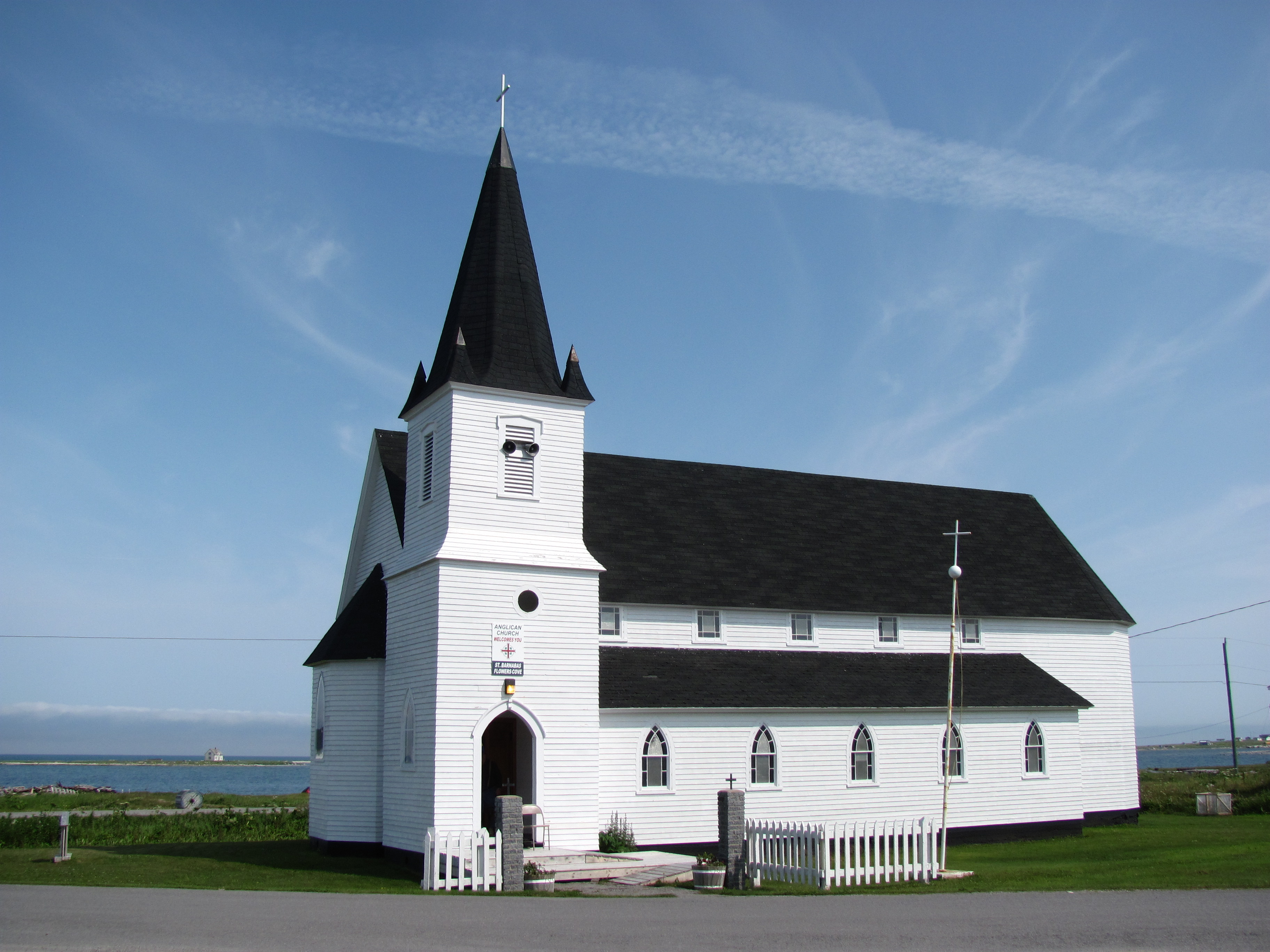
St. Barnabas Anglican Church

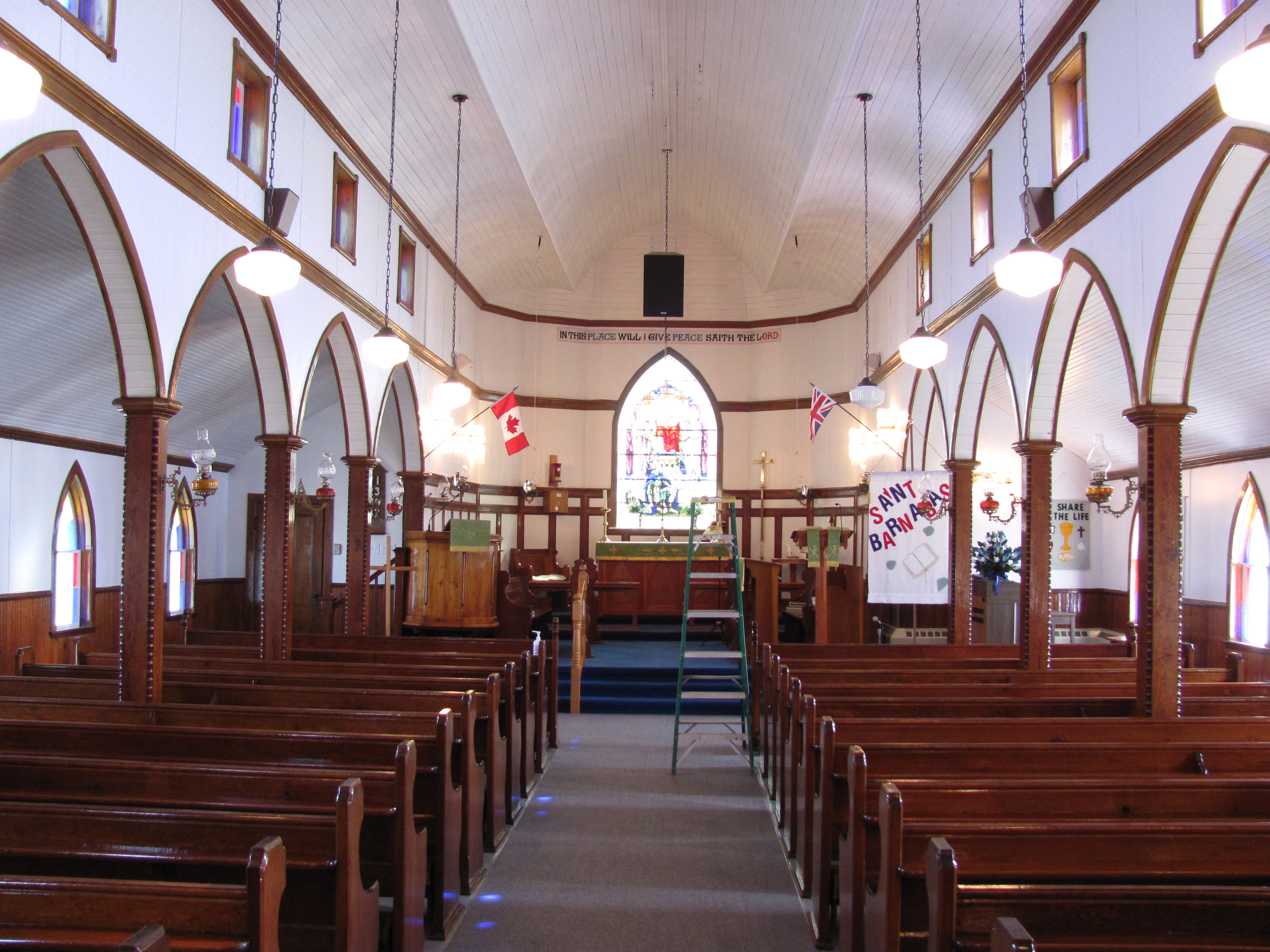
St. Barnabas Anglican Church

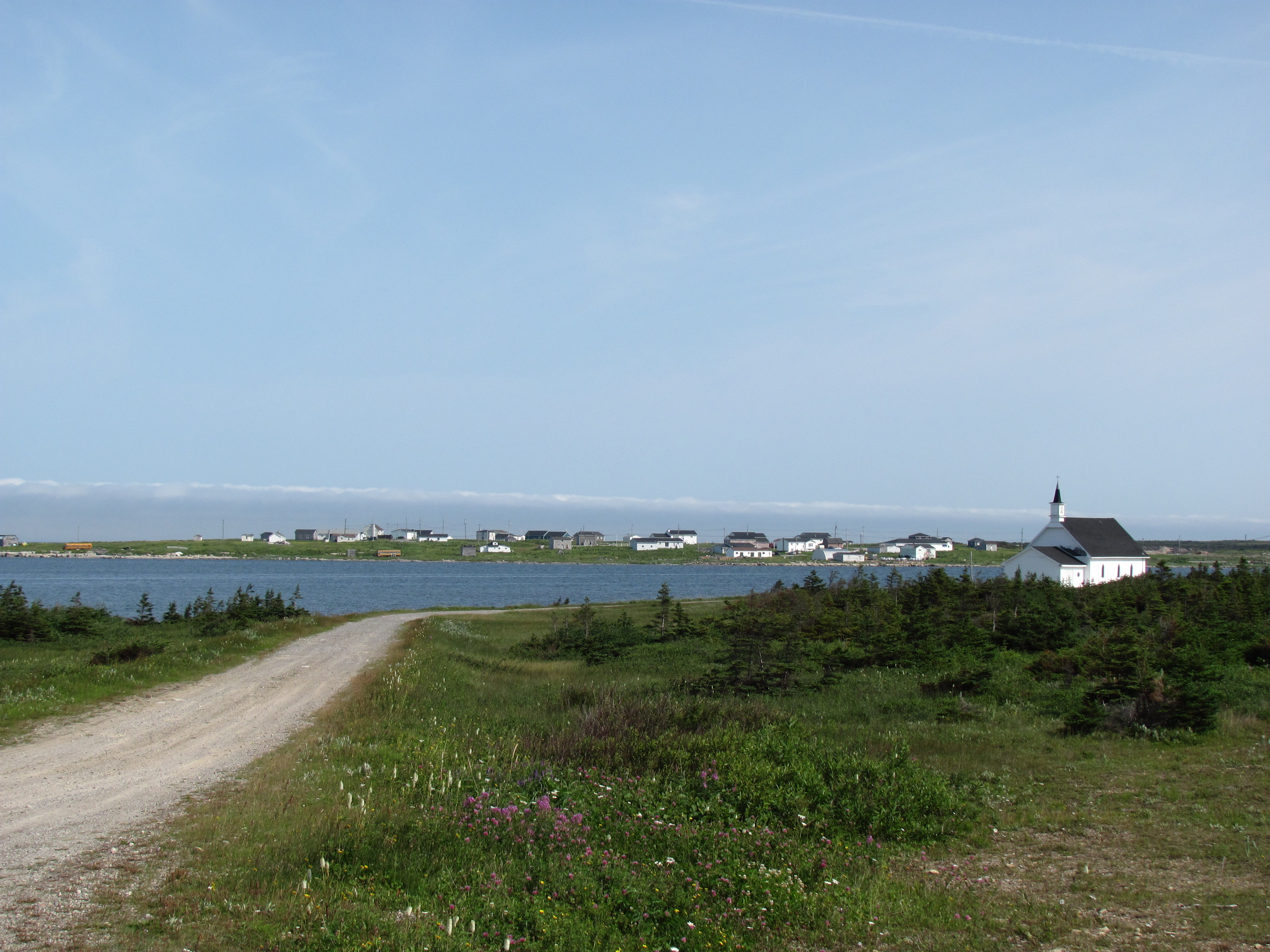
United Church

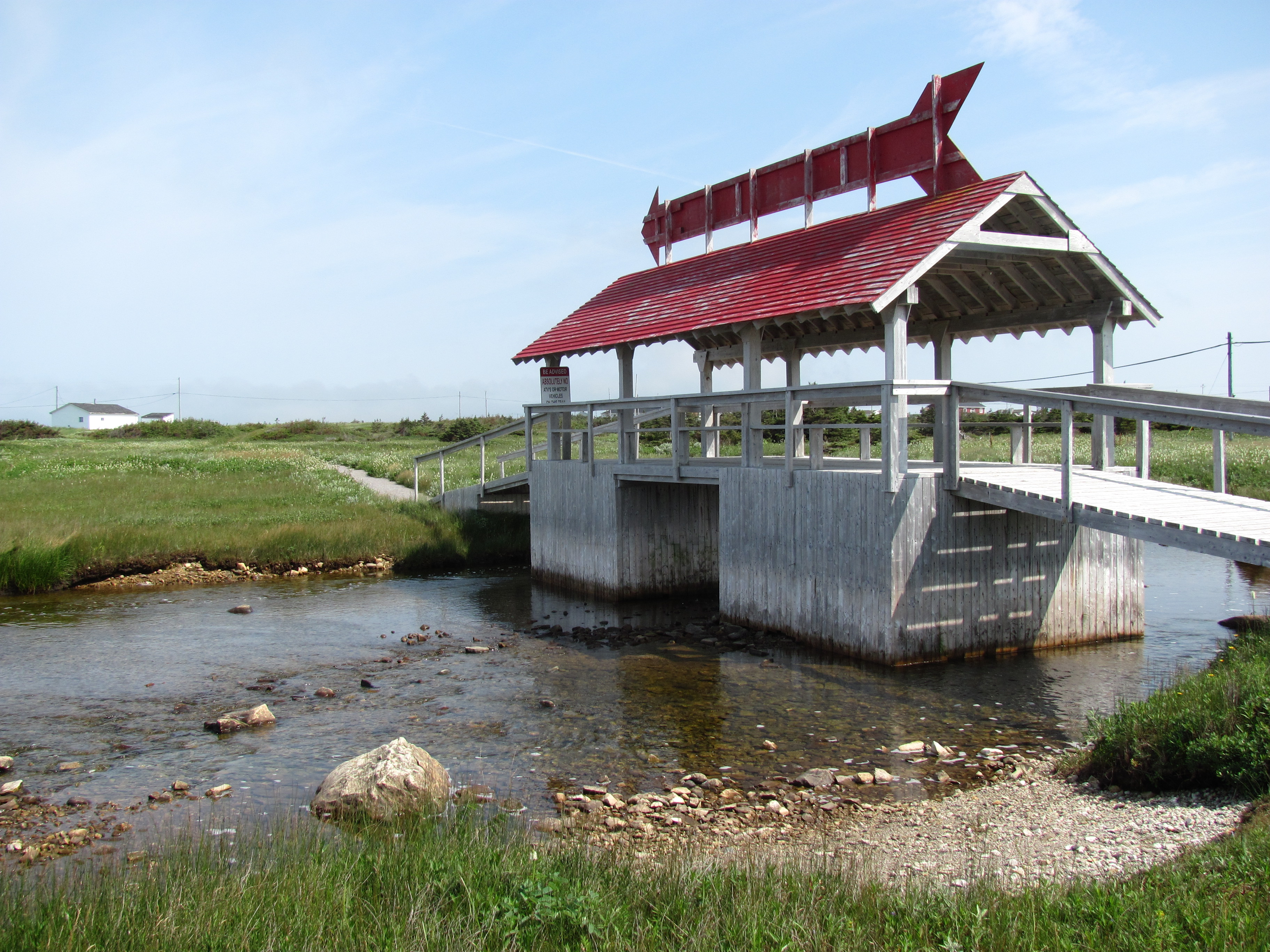
Marjorie Bridge

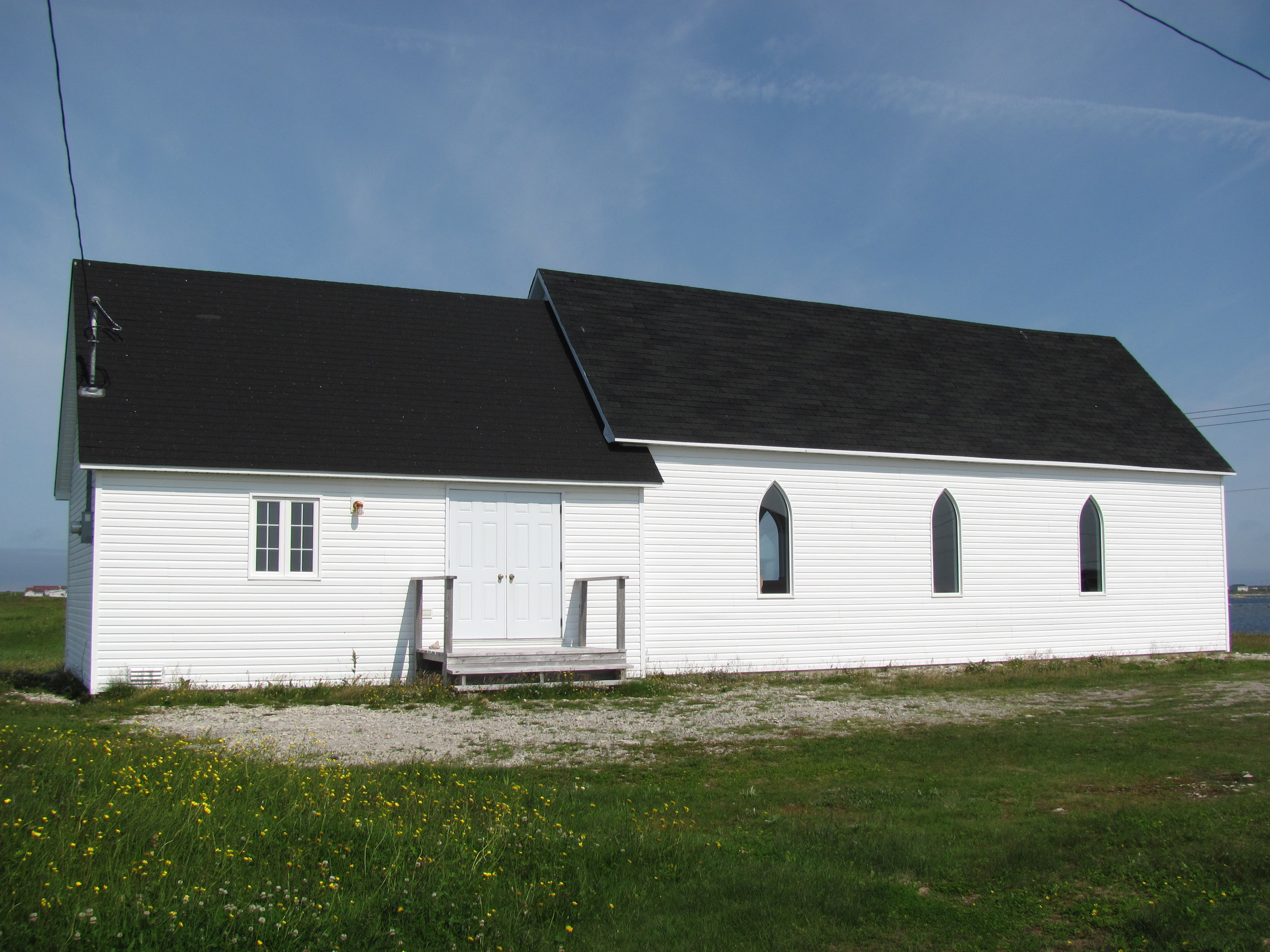
Catholic Church Lady of Snow

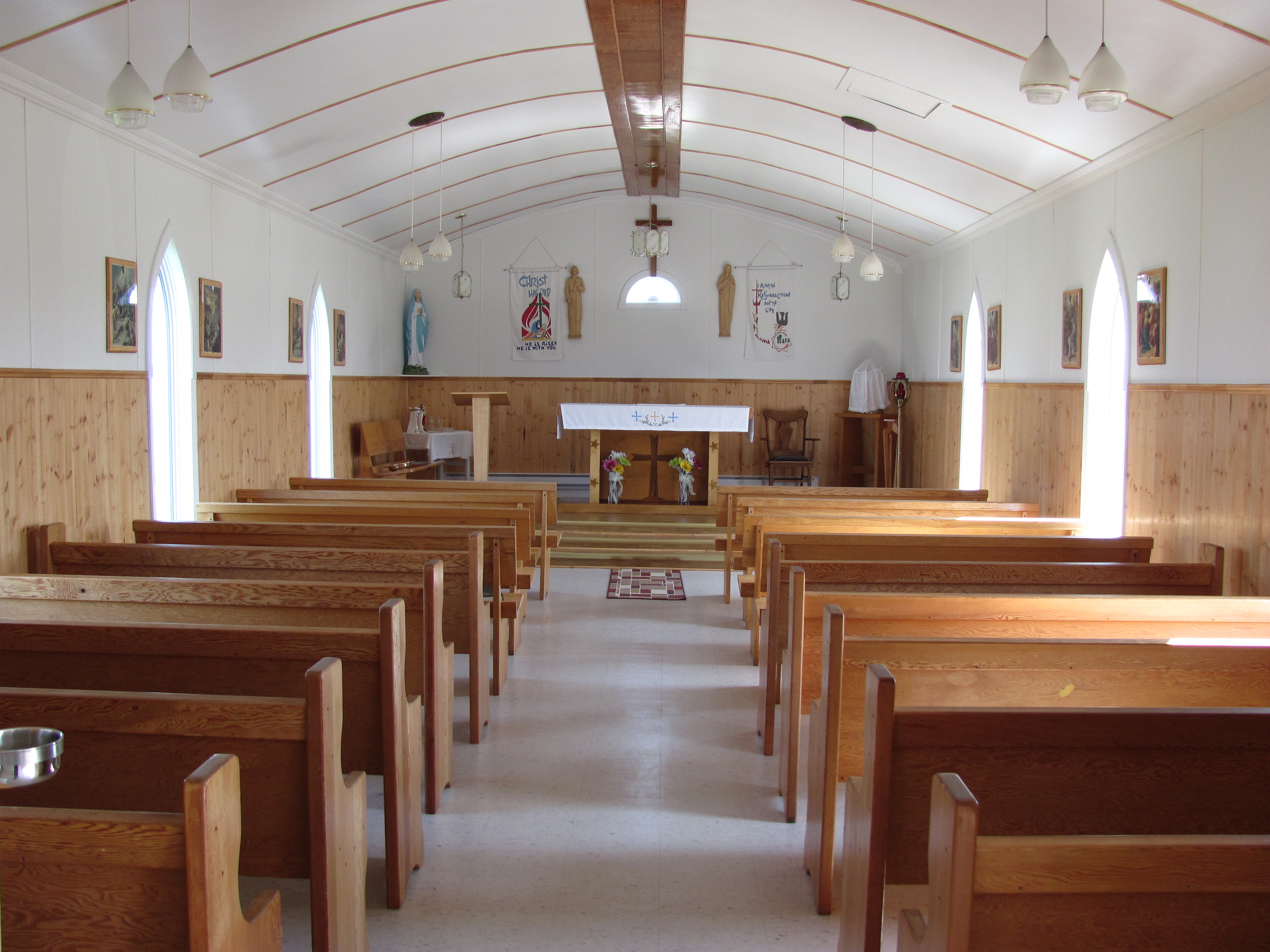
Catholic Church Lady of Snow

== See also ==
- List of lighthouses in Canada
- List of cities and towns in Newfoundland and Labrador
