= Daniel's Harbour =

- Town
- Location of Daniel's Harbour in Newfoundland
- Coordinates: 50°13′58″N 57°34′55″W
- Country: Canada
- Province: Newfoundland and Labrador

Government
  - Mayor: Ross Humber
  - Governing Body: City Council
  - MP: Carol Anstey
  - MHA: Mike Goosney

Area
  - Land: 8.19 km^{2} (3.16 sq mi)

Population (2021)
  - Total: 220
  - Density: 30.9/km^{2} (80/sq mi)
- Time zone: UTC-3:30 (NST)
  - Summer (DST): UTC-2:30 (NDT)
- Area code: 709
- Highways: Route 430

Daniel's Harbour is a community on the west coast of Newfoundland, in the province of Newfoundland and Labrador. Its population as reported by the 2021 Census was 220 people. It has a reputation as a great place for wild whale sightings.

== Climate ==
Daniel's Harbour has a subarctic climate (Koppen: Dfc) with June being under the 10 °C (50 °F) isotherm due to extreme seasonal lag caused by the cold Labrador Current. Summers are cool to mild while winters are freezing. Precipitation is heavy year round, though less heavy during spring.

Climate data for Daniel's Harbour
Month	Jan	Feb	Mar	Apr	May	Jun	Jul	Aug	Sep	Oct	Nov	Dec	Year
Record high °C (°F)	15.8 (60.4)	14.9 (58.8)	17.4 (63.3)	20.7 (69.3)	24.4 (75.9)	25.6 (78.1)	28.9 (84.0)	27.0 (80.6)	27.2 (81.0)	23.3 (73.9)	21.4 (70.5)	18.3 (64.9)	28.9 (84.0)
Mean daily maximum °C (°F)	−4.2 (24.4)	−5.2 (22.6)	−1.2 (29.8)	4 (39)	8.9 (48.0)	13.4 (56.1)	17.2 (63.0)	17.5 (63.5)	14.1 (57.4)	8.7 (47.7)	3.9 (39.0)	−1.1 (30.0)	6.3 (43.4)
Daily mean °C (°F)	−8.4 (16.9)	−9.6 (14.7)	−5.4 (22.3)	0.6 (33.1)	5.1 (41.2)	9.8 (49.6)	13.9 (57.0)	14.3 (57.7)	10.8 (51.4)	5.6 (42.1)	0.9 (33.6)	−4.7 (23.5)	2.7 (36.9)
Mean daily minimum °C (°F)	−12.5 (9.5)	−13.9 (7.0)	−9.6 (14.7)	−2.8 (27.0)	1.3 (34.3)	6.1 (43.0)	10.7 (51.3)	11 (52)	7.5 (45.5)	2.5 (36.5)	−2 (28)	−8.3 (17.1)	−0.8 (30.5)
Record low °C (°F)	−39.4 (−38.9)	−34.5 (−30.1)	−30.6 (−23.1)	−19 (−2)	−9 (16)	−4.4 (24.1)	0.6 (33.1)	0 (32)	−2.8 (27.0)	−11.1 (12.0)	−15 (5)	−27.2 (−17.0)	−39.4 (−38.9)
Average precipitation mm (inches)	113.1 (4.45)	85.3 (3.36)	88.3 (3.48)	62.3 (2.45)	77.3 (3.04)	105.3 (4.15)	105.5 (4.15)	117.5 (4.63)	101.5 (4.00)	111.3 (4.38)	111.3 (4.38)	100.3 (3.95)	1,179 (46.42)
Source: Environment Canada

== Demographics ==
In the 2021 Census of Population conducted by Statistics Canada, Daniel's Harbour had a population of 220 living in 114 of its 152 total private dwellings, a change of −13% from its 2016 population of 253. With a land area of 7.68 km^{2} (2.97 sq mi), it had a population density of 28.6/km^{2} (74.2/sq mi) in 2021.

== See also ==
- List of cities and towns in Newfoundland and Labrador
