= Area codes 709 and 879 =

Telephone area code for Newfoundland and Labrador

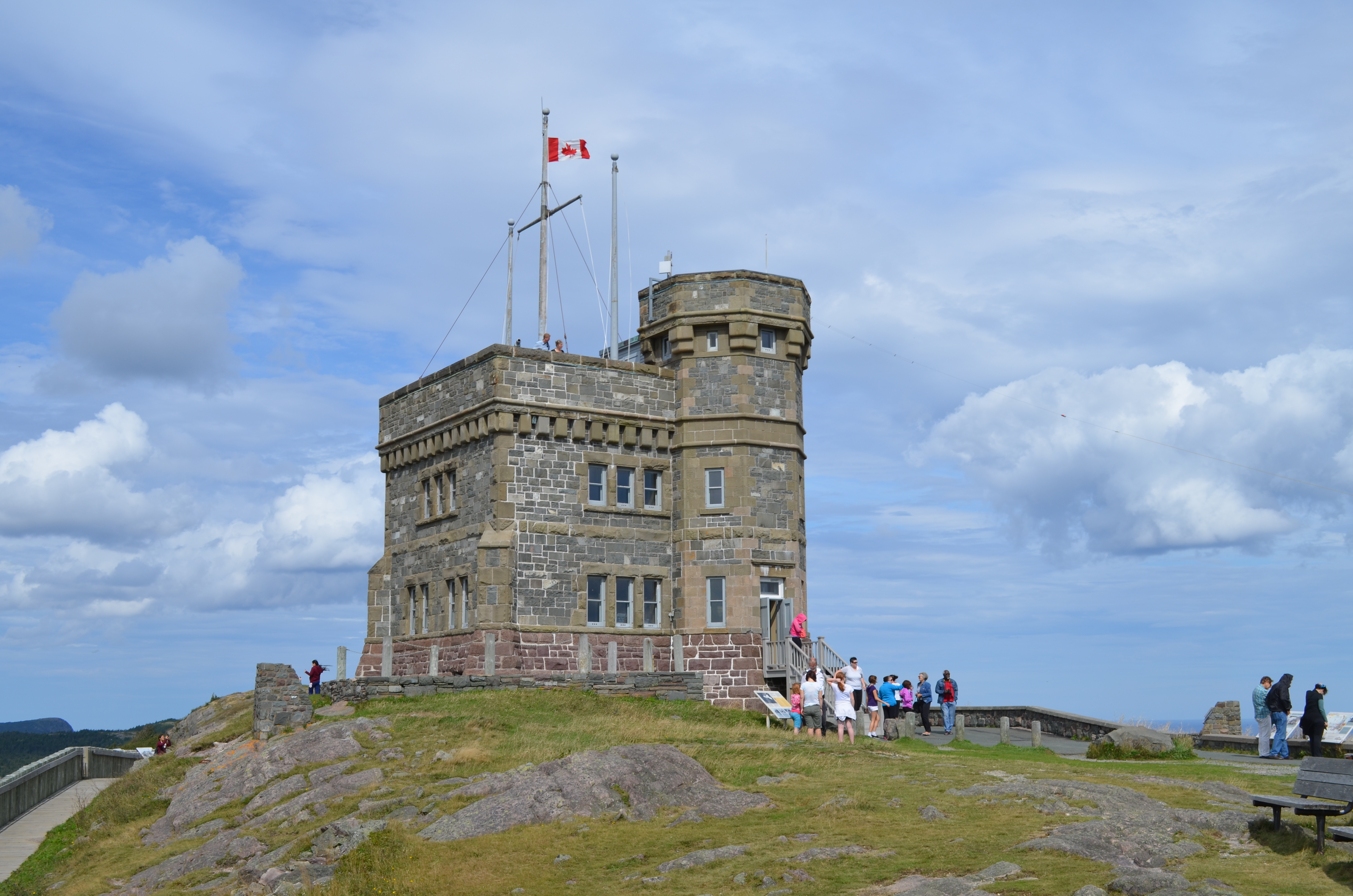
Signal Hill, Newfoundland

Area codes 709 and 879 are the telephone area codes in the North American Numbering Plan (NANP) for the Canadian province of Newfoundland and Labrador.

== History ==
The first telephone system was installed in Newfoundland in 1885, but domestic long-distance calls within the Dominion of Newfoundland could be placed on a limited basis only in 1921. The first long-distance call from Newfoundland to Canada was made on January 10, 1939, by using a shortwave radio link operated by the Canadian Marconi Company in Montréal. Shortwave radio also carried calls from St. John's to London, England.

When the first comprehensive continental telephone numbering plan was created in 1947, establishing the original North American area codes, Newfoundland had not yet become of part of Canada. No provisions had been made to include Newfoundland in the numbering plan. The Newfoundland telephone system was entirely manual, and dial telephones came to St. John's only in 1948.

After Newfoundland's Confederation with the Dominion of Canada was enacted in 1949, the first cross-province long-distance call was placed from St. John's to Port aux Basques in 1949.

In 1949, Newfoundland was added in an expansion of numbering plan area 902, which comprised the three Maritime provinces. The area code remains in use for Nova Scotia and Prince Edward Island. New Brunswick and Newfoundland were split from the NPA with area code 506 in 1955. In 1962, Labrador was split off and combined with Newfoundland to form a new numbering plan area with area code 709. Canadian direct-distance dial locations gradually increased over the next several years, beginning in 1958 with the country's largest cities, Toronto and Montreal. The area codes served mostly for Operator Toll Dialing until customer dialing of long-distance calls became common in the 1960s.

The incumbent local exchange carrier for area code 709 is Bell Aliant. It is owned by Bell Canada, which was formed in 1999 as a result of a merger that included NewTel Communications (previously Newfoundland Telephone). There had been as many as nine companies in Newfoundland and Labrador until 1951. NewTel acquired the last independent company in 1988.

In 2017, area code 879 was assigned as the second area code for Newfoundland and Labrador for relief action by overlay. In July 2020, the North American Numbering Plan Administrator estimated an exhaustion stage for NPA 709 of June 2028, which led to an indefinite suspension of relief action in 2021. Relief planning was rescheduled by the CRTC on September 15, 2023, for activation of an overlay on February 17, 2024.

The central office prefix 988 is used in the numbering plan area in Norman's Bay. As the Canadian Radio-television and Telecommunications Commission recommended using the three-digit code 988 for suicide prevention, after the United States has implemented the same code for the National Suicide Prevention Lifeline, ten-digit dialling was implemented on April 1, 2023, across Newfoundland and Labrador.

== Service area and central office prefixes ==
At the time of creation of the 879 overlay, NPA 709 comprised 209 exchange areas.

- Premium numbers: 976
- Arnold's Cove: 463, 556
- Badger: 539
- Baie Verte: 297, 529, 532, 554
- Battle Harbour: 972
- Bay L'Argent: 373 461
- Bay Roberts: 222, 680, 683, 703, 786, 787, 788, 983
- Beaumont: 264
- Belleoram: 881
- Bellevue: 442, 762
- Bell Island: 488, 849
- Birchy Bay: 659, 761
- Bishop's Falls: 258, 395
- Black Duck Cove: 877
- Black Tickle: 471
- Bonavista: 218, 468, 470, 476, 704
- Botwood: 257, 389
- Boyd's Cove: 259, 656
- Branch: 338
- Brent's Cove: 575, 661
- Brig Bay: 247
- Brigus: 527, 528
- Brown's Arm: 654
- Buchans: 672, 719
- Burgeo: 886
- Burin: 342, 891, 894
- Burlington: 239, 252
- Burnt Islands, Isle aux Morts, Margaree: 698
- Campbellton: 261, 262
- Cape Broyle: 432, 756
- Carbonear: 501, 595, 596, 597, 945, 978
- Carmanville: 291, 534, 858
- Cartwright: 938
- Catalina: 469, 477
- Centreville: 522, 561, 678
- Chance Cove: 460, 768
- Change Islands: 621
- Chapel Arm: 592, 593
- Charlottetown (Bonavista Bay): 664, 667
- Charlottetown (Labrador): 949
- Churchill Falls: 735, 925, 977
- Clarenville: 425, 426, 427, 429, 433, 466, 766, 907, 979
- Clarke's Head: 676, 767
- Codroy: 955
- Come By Chance: 472, 542, 557
- Comfort Cove-Newstead: 244, 246
- Conche: 622
- Cook's Harbour: 249
- Coomb's Cove: 887
- Corner Brook: 216, 289, 388, 412, 612, 619, 630, 632, 634, 637, 638, 639, 640, 660, 785
- Cottrell's Cove: 485, 491
- Cow Head: 243
- Daniel's Harbour: 898
- Deer Lake: 215, 299, 391, 633, 635, 636
- Degras: 272, 644
- Eastport: 303, 526, 677
- Englee: 866
- English Harbour East: 245, 376
- English Harbour West: 888
- Fair Haven: 878
- Fermeuse: 363, 718
- Flatrock: 437
- Fleur de Lys: 253
- Flower's Cove: 456
- Fogo: 266, 270, 863, 989
- Forteau: 931
- Francois: 842
- French Island: 934
- Freshwater: 213, 226, 227, 230, 286, 980
- Gambo: 524, 564, 674
- Gander: 220, 234, 235, 256, 287, 381, 422, 424, 431, 571, 651
- Garden Cove: 549, 550
- Garnish: 328, 826
- Gaultois: 841
- Glenwood: 574, 679
- Glovertown: 520, 533, 563, 985
- Grand Bank: 353, 377, 832
- Grand Bruit: 492
- Grand Falls-Windsor: 290, 292, 293, 358, 393, 486, 489, 572
- Grandois: 423
- Great Harbour Deep: 843
- Green Island Cove: 475
- Greenspond: 223, 269
- Grey River: 296
- Griquet: 623
- Hampden: 455
- Hant's Harbour: 586
- Happy Valley-Goose Bay: 217, 372, 414, 896, 897, 899, 929, 982, 998
- Harbour Breton: 323, 885
- Harbour Main: 229, 231
- Hare Bay: 523, 537
- Harry's Harbour: 624
- Hawke's Bay: 248
- Heart's Content: 583, 585
- Heart's Delight: 588, 590
- Hermitage: 880, 883
- Hickman's Harbour: 547, 559
- Hillgrade: 628, 827
- Hillview: 434, 546
- Hopedale: 933
- Horwood: 671, 892
- Humber Arm South: 789
- Jackson's Arm: 459
- Jamestown: 473
- Jeffrey's: 274, 645, 775
- Joe Batt's Arm: 658
- King's Cove: 447, 448
- King's Point: 268, 481
- Labrador City - Wabush: 280, 282, 285, 288, 413, 930, 944, 962, 987
- Ladle Cove: 670, 874
- Lamaline: 369, 857
- L'Anse-au-Loup: 927
- La Poile: 496
- Lark Harbour: 681
- La Scie: 566, 675
- Leading Tickles: 483
- Lewisporte: 535, 541, 569
- Little Bay: 267
- Little Bay Islands: 626
- Little Harbour: 465
- Little Heart's Ease: 435, 548
- Long Harbour: 228
- Long Pond: 240, 284, 480, 744, 781, 834, 835
- Lourdes: 271, 642
- Lower Island Cove: 584
- Lumsden: 281, 530
- Main Brook: 865
- Makkovik: 923
- Mary's Harbour: 921
- Marystown: 276, 277, 279, 332, 357, 567, 909, 981
- McCallum: 846
- McIvers: 688
- Millertown: 852
- Milltown: 882, 889
- Ming's Bight: 254
- Monkstown: 356
- Monroe: 663
- Moreton's Harbour: 684, 831
- Mount Carmel: 521, 578
- Musgrave Harbour: 655
- Musgravetown: 439, 467
- Nain: 922
- Natuashish: 478
- New Chelsea: 586, 591
- New Harbour: 580, 582
- Newman's Cove: 445, 446
- Nipper's Harbour: 255
- Norman's Bay: 988
- Norris Arm: 653
- North West River: 497
- Old Perlican: 587, 620
- Pacquet: 251, 565
- Paradise River: 845
- Pasadena: 394, 686
- Petite Forte: 428
- Pinsent's Arm: 951
- Plate Cove: 544, 545
- Point Leamington: 484
- Pool's Cove: 665
- Port Albert: 241
- Port au Port: 278, 648
- Port aux Basques: 694, 695, 696
- Port Blandford: 347, 543
- Port Hope Simpson: 960
- Port Rexton: 436, 464, 562
- Port Saunders: 298, 861
- Portugal Cove: 242, 560, 773, 895
- Postville: 479
- Pouch Cove: 232, 335
- Princeton: 462, 558
- Raleigh: 452
- Ramea: 625
- Red Bay: 920
- Reef's Harbour: 847
- Rencontre East: 848
- Rigolet: 947
- River of Ponds: 225
- Robert's Arm: 650, 652, 869
- Rocky Harbour: 419, 458
- Roddickton: 457, 774
- Rose Blanche: 956
- Rushoon: 374, 443
- Seal Cove (Fortune Bay): 851
- Seal Cove (White Bay): 531
- Seldom: 627
- Smokey: 961
- Sop's Arm: 482
- South Brook: 657, 868
- Springdale: 668, 673, 692, 867, 990
- St. Alban's: 324, 500, 538
- St. Anthony: 212, 449, 450, 454
- St. Brendan's: 669
- St. Bride's: 337, 519
- Stephenville: 214, 283, 641, 643, 649, 721, 973
- Stephenville Crossing: 444, 646
- St. George's: 275, 647
- St. John's (including some suburbs): 221, 237, 260, 273, 314, 315, 325, 327, 330, 341, 351, 352, 364, 368, 383, 415, 551, 552, 553, 570, 576, 579, 631, 682, 685, 687, 689, 690, 691, 693, 697, 699, 700, 701, 702, 705, 722, 724, 725, 726, 727, 728, 729, 730, 731, 733, 737, 738, 739, 740, 741, 743, 745, 746, 747, 748, 749, 750, 752, 753, 754, 757, 758, 763, 764, 765, 769, 770, 771, 772, 777, 778, 782, 793, 800, 833, 844, 850, 853, 864, 948, 986, 997, 999
- St. Lawrence: 320, 359, 873
- St. Lewis: 939
- St. Mary's: 295, 525
- Summerford: 629, 723
- Summerside: 783
- Terra Nova: 265
- Terrenceville: 375, 662
- Torbay: 233, 400, 401, 437, 577
- Trepassey: 326, 438, 717
- Triton: 263, 421, 441
- Trout River: 451
- Twillingate: 304, 884, 893
- Upper Island Cove: 573, 589, 594, 720, 910, 984
- Victoria Conception Bay North: 595, 596
- Wesleyville: 348, 536, 540
- Western Bay: 598
- Westport: 224, 236
- Whitbourne: 759, 760
- Wild Cove: 329
- William's Harbour: 924
- Winterton: 583
- Witless Bay: 238, 334, 493
- Woody Point: 453

== See also ==
- Telephone numbers in Canada
- Canadian Numbering Administration Consortium

Newfoundland and Labrador area codes: 709/879
	North: Country code 299 in Greenland	
West: 418/581, 819/873, 782/902	709/879	East: Atlantic Ocean
	South: 418/581, country code 508 in Saint-Pierre and Miquelon, Atlantic Ocean	
Nova Scotia and Prince Edward Island area codes: 782/902
Quebec area codes: 418/581/367, 450/579/354, 514/438/263, 819/873/468
