= Great Northern Peninsula =

Peninsula of Newfoundland, Canada

Coordinates: 50°27′48.6″N 56°46′7.1″W

The Great Northern Peninsula (or simply just the Northern Peninsula) is the largest and longest peninsula of Newfoundland, Canada, approximately 270 km long and 90 km wide at its widest point and encompassing an area of 17,483 km^{2}. It is defined as that part of Newfoundland from Bonne Bay northwards around Cape Norman and Cape Bauld and thence southwards to the head of White Bay, bounded by the Gulf of St. Lawrence on the west, the Strait of Belle Isle on the north and the Labrador Sea and White Bay on the east.

The vast majority of the peninsula is located within Division No. 9, Newfoundland and Labrador, except for the southeastern corner, which is part of Subdivision G of Division No. 5, Newfoundland and Labrador. In 1991, the peninsula had 23,854 inhabitants. By 2016, however, the population had decreased to 15,607, further decreased to 14,733 in 2021.

St. Anthony is the largest population centre on the peninsula. A ferry service operates at the western part of the Strait of Belle Isle between St. Barbe, Newfoundland, and Blanc Sablon, Quebec.

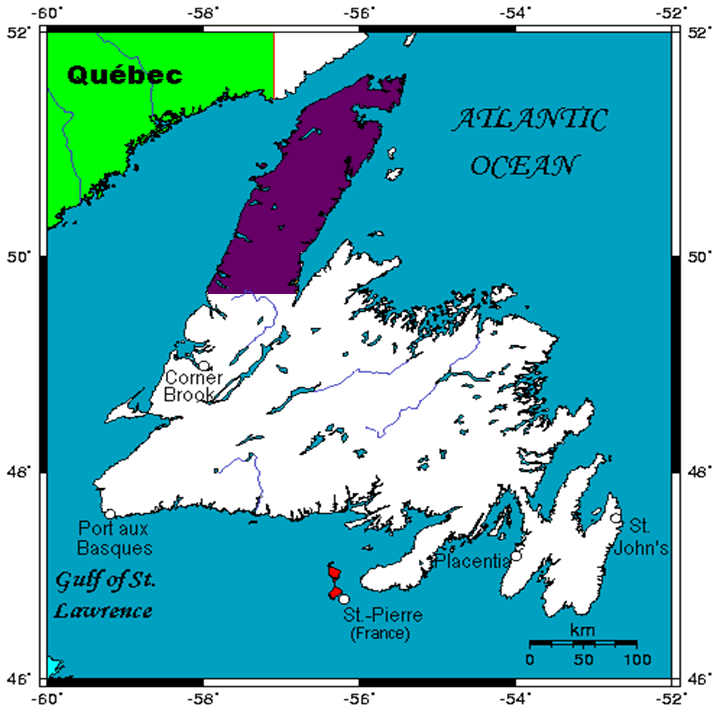

== Topography ==
The Great Northern Peninsula can be divided into two main topographic areas: the high plateau of the Long Range Mountains, and the low-lying coastal areas around which all of settlements can be found. The Long Range Mountains are a mixture of steep mountain valleys with spectacular fjords leading to the sea and mountainous areas dotted with many lakes and rivers. The northern end of the peninsula is indented by Hare Bay. The south and eastern end of the peninsula are mountainous, while the western end has a coastal plain in the northern half and deep fiords in the southern half.

Gros Morne National Park is located on the peninsula.

== See also ==
- Gros Morne National Park
- L'Anse aux Meadows
- List of communities in Newfoundland and Labrador
- Newfoundland and Labrador Route 430
- Newfoundland-Labrador fixed link
- Sir Wilfred Grenfell
