= The Isles of Notre Dame =

Former provincial electoral district in Newfoundland and Labrador, Canada

Newfoundland and Labrador electoral district
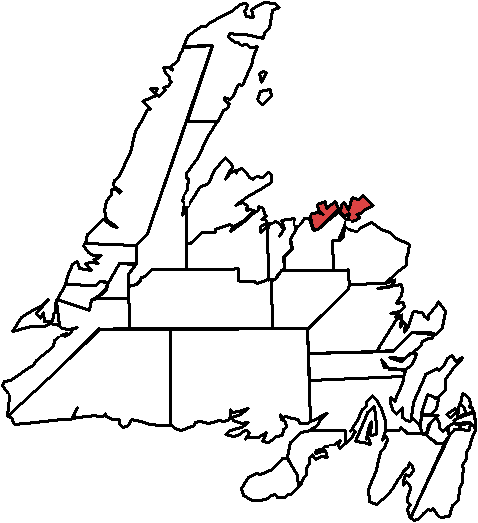
- The Isles of Notre Dame in relation to other districts in Newfoundland

Defunct provincial electoral district
- Legislature: Newfoundland and Labrador House of Assembly
- District created: 1996
- First contested: 1996
- Last contested: 2011

Demographics
- Population (2006): 10,160
- Electors (2011): 6,990

The Isles of Notre Dame, formerly called Twillingate and Fogo, is a defunct provincial electoral district for the House of Assembly of Newfoundland and Labrador, Canada. In 2011 the district had 6,990 eligible voters.

The district was created prior to the 1996 election from Twillingate and part of Fogo. The district was abolished in 2015 and replaced by Lewisporte-Twillingate and Fogo Island-Cape Freels.

This district was represented by former Liberal party leader, Gerry Reid from 1996 to 2007.

== Members of the House of Assembly ==
The district has elected the following members of the House of Assembly:

Member	Party	Term
Derrick Dalley	Progressive Conservative	2007–2015
Gerry Reid	Liberal	1996-2007

=== Twillingate ===
Member	Party	Term
Walter Carter	Liberal	1985–1996
Ida M. Reid	Progressive Conservative	1982–1985
William Rowe	Liberal	1977–1982
Joey Smallwood	Reform Liberal	1975–1977
Herbert Gillett	Liberal	1972–1975
William Adams	Liberal	1971–1972
Leslie Curtis	Liberal	1949–1971

== Election results ==
=== The Isles of Notre Dame ===
2011 Newfoundland and Labrador general election
Party	Candidate	Votes	%	±%
Progressive Conservative	Derrick Dalley	2,764	67.65%	–
Liberal	Danny Dumaresque	1,070	26.19%	
NDP	Tree Walsh	252	6.17%	

2007 Newfoundland and Labrador general election
Party	Candidate	Votes	%	±%
Progressive Conservative	Derrick Dalley	2371	50.07%	+5.82
Liberal	Gerry Reid	2364	49.93%	-5.82

=== Twillingate and Fogo ===
2003 Newfoundland and Labrador general election
Party	Candidate	Votes	%	±%
Liberal	Gerry Reid	2941	55.75	-10.07
Progressive Conservative	Derrick Dalley	2344	44.25	+15.39

1999 Newfoundland and Labrador general election
Party	Candidate	Votes	%	±%
Liberal	Gerry Reid	3343	65.82	
Progressive Conservative	Gerald McKenna	1466	28.86	–
Independent	Dallas Mitchell	270	5.32	

== Boundary description ==
The District of The Isles of Notre Dame shall consist of and include all that part of the province of Newfoundland and Labrador to include the islands of Twillingate, New World Island, Change Islands, Fogo Island and the following adjacent islands: Black Island, Western Indian Island, Eastern Indian Island and Bacalhao Island.

== Communities ==
1. Barr'd Islands
2. Black Duck Cove
3. Bridgeport
4. Carter's Cove
5. ChancePort
6. Change Islands
7. Cobb's Arm
8. Crow Head
9. Deep Bay
10. Fairbank
11. Fogo
12. Fogo Island Centre
13. Green Cove
14. Herring Neck
15. Hillgrade
16. Indian Cove
17. Island Harbour
18. Joe Batt's Arm
19. Kettle Cove
20. Little Harbour
21. Little Seldom
22. Merritt's Harbour
23. Moreton's Harbour
24. Newville
25. Paradise
26. Pike's Arm
27. Purcell's Harbour
28. Ragged Point
29. Rogers Cove
30. Salt Harbour
31. Seldom
32. Shoal Bay
33. Stag Harbour
34. Summerford
35. Tilting
36. Tizzard's Harbour
37. Toogood Arm
38. Twillingate
39. Valley Pond
40. Virgin Arm

== See also ==
- List of Newfoundland and Labrador provincial electoral districts
- Canadian provincial electoral districts
