= Newfoundland and Labrador Route 340 =

Highway in Newfoundland and Labrador, Canada

Route 340
- Road to the Isles
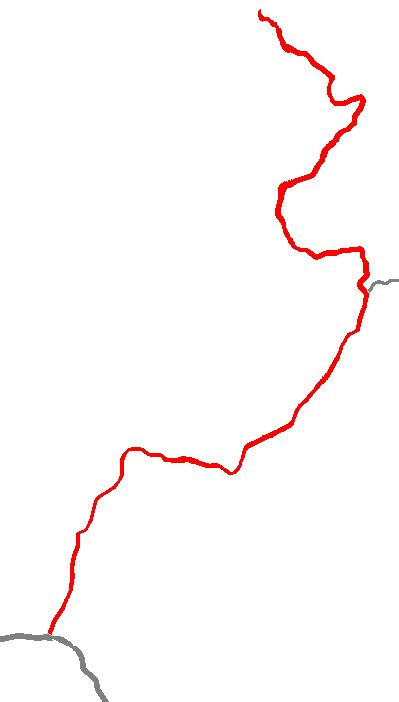

Route information
- Maintained by Newfoundland and Labrador Department of Transportation and Infrastructure
- Length: 106.3 km (66.1 mi)

Major junctions
- South end: Route 1 (TCH) near Lewisporte
- Route 341 in Lewisporte; Route 343 near Campbellton; Route 331 near Boyd's Cove; Route 344 in Summerford; Route 345 in Virgin Arm; Route 346 near Newville
- North end: Long Point Lighthouse near Crow Head

Location
- Country: Canada
- Province: Newfoundland and Labrador

Highway system
- Highways in Newfoundland and Labrador
← Route 335	→ Route 341

Route 340, also known as Road to the Isles, is a road in the Canadian province of Newfoundland and Labrador passing through the towns of Lewisporte, Summerford and Twillingate, all in The Isles of Notre Dame region of the province.

The highway has a total length of 106.3 kilometres (66.1 mi) and a speed limit in the range of 40–80 km/h depending on whether the road is passing through a settlement.

As the route's alternate name implies, the Road to the Isles passes through several islands off the coast of the main island of Newfoundland, such as New World Island, Twillingate Islands and some uninhabited islands. Change Islands and Fogo Island are accessible by ferry via Route 331, which has a junction with Route 340.

Route 340 is the only road connection that New World Island and Twillingate Islands have with the main island.

== Route description ==
Route 340 begins at Notre Dame Junction, which is a nickname given to the route's interchange with Route 1 (the Trans-Canada Highway). Leading northward, the route passes through the town of Lewisporte, where it then continues by turning right at an intersection with Route 341.

The route continues northeastward and passes through the shoreline communities of Michael's Harbour and Campbellton, where the route intersects Route 343. Continuing northeastward, the route also intersects Route 331. This route leads to ferries connecting Change Islands and Fogo Island with the main island.

Route 340 then passes through the community of Boyd's Cove. Afterwards, the route leads northward through a series of causeways that connect the main island of Newfoundland with New World Island. While on New World Island, the route passes through the town of Summerford and intersects Route 344. Following that intersection, the route leads northward until passing through Virgin Arm, where it then intersects Route 345 and leads northeastward. It then passes by Dildo Run Provincial Park and through the communities of Fairbanks, Hillgrade and Newville.

1.5 km north of Newville, the route intersects Route 346 and then veers westward towards a causeway connecting New World Island to Twillingate Islands. After the causeway, the route immediately veers northward and passes through Purcell's Harbour and Little Harbour, where the route then veers northwestward.

The route then passes through the town of Twillingate, where a left turn at a local intersection is required to remain on the route. Through the town, the route is largely residential and is called Main Street. After a small loop, the route leads northwestward through Tickle Bridge and continues through Twillingate. The road then passes through Wild Cove and Crow Head, where a sharp right turn is required to remain on Route 340. The final stretch leads northward to Long Point Lighthouse, located at the edge of the Atlantic Ocean.

== List of communities along route ==
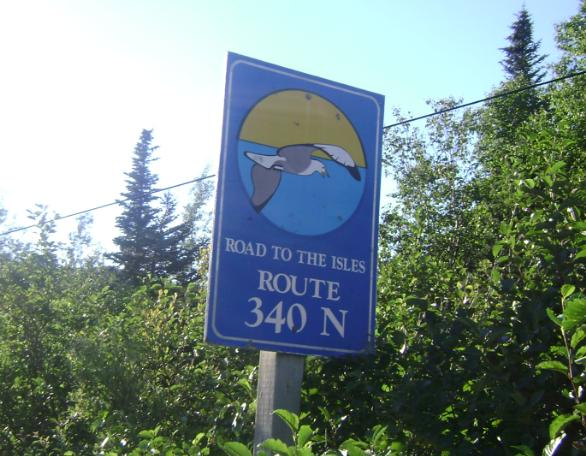
NL Route 340 road sign

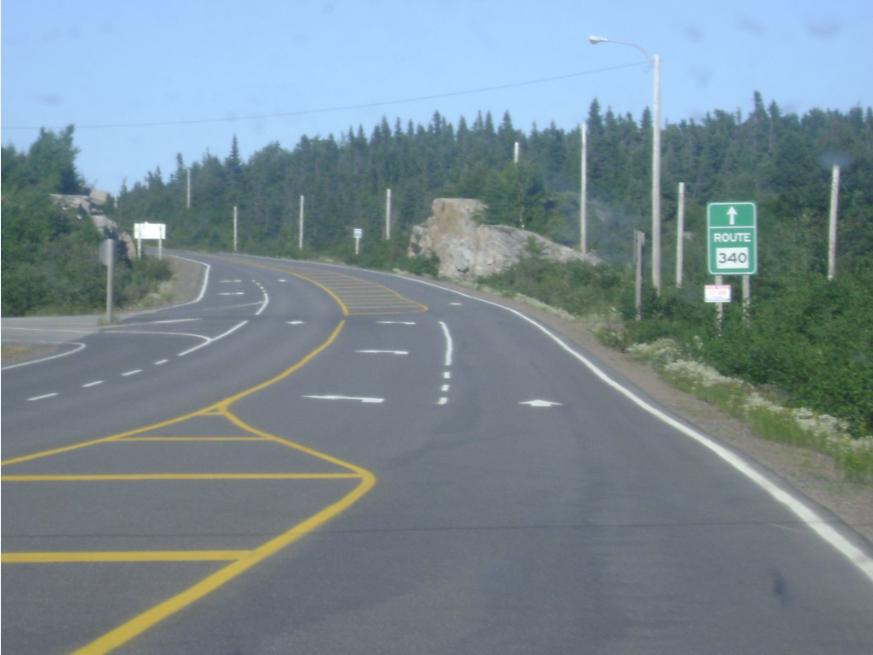
Birchy Bay exit

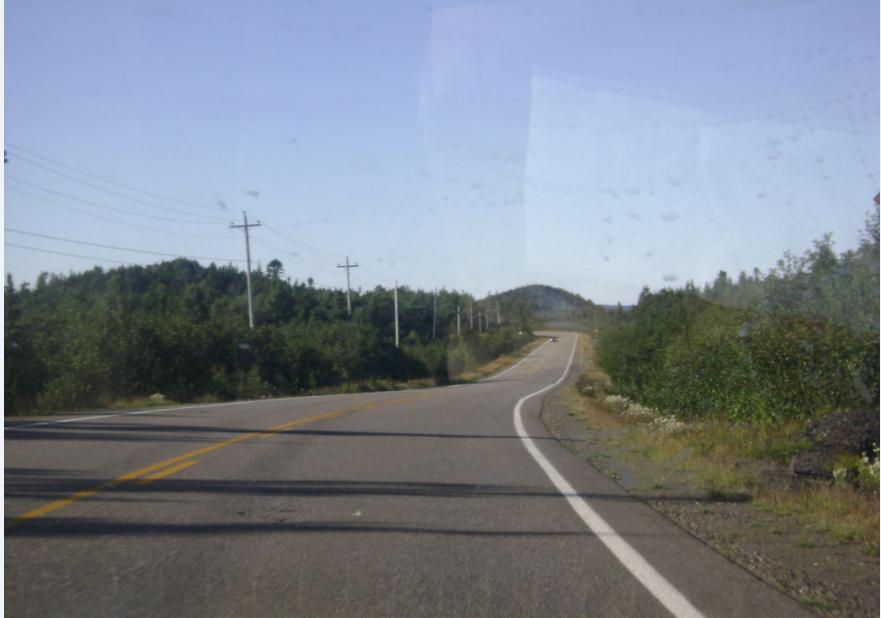
Heading northbound towards Twillingate

Communities are arranged in order from the Trans-Canada Highway exit to the end at Twillingate, including those accessible by short highways that branch off from Route 340. Towns of 500 or more people are in bold:

- **Lewisporte**
- Embree (accessible by driving through Lewisporte)
- Little Burnt Bay (accessible by driving through Lewisporte)
- Michael's Harbour
- Campbellton
- Comfort Cove-Newstead
- Loon Bay
- Baytona
- Birchy Bay
- Gander Bay (exit to route 330 in Boyd's Cove)
- Boyd's Cove
- **Summerford**
- Cottlesville (exit in Summerford)
- Virgin Arm
- Moreton's Harbour (exit in Virgin Arm)
- Tizzard's Harbour (exit in Virgin Arm)
- Parkview
- Fairbanks
- Hillgrade
- Newville
- Cobb's Arm (exit around Newville)
- Pike's Arm (exit around Newville)
- Toogood Arm (exit around Newville)
- Herring Neck (exit around Indian Cove)
- Salt Harbour (through Herring Neck)
- Indian Cove
- Black Duck Cove (exit 1 on Twillingate Island)
- Kettle Cove (exit 2 on Twillingate Island)
- Bayview (exit 2 on Twillingate Island)
- Purcell's Harbour (exits 3 and 4 on Twillingate Island)
- Little Harbour (exits 5 and 6 on Twillingate Island)
- **Twillingate**
- Durrell (right turn at Main Street-Toulinguet Street intersection in Twillingate)
- Back Cove
- Wild Cove
- Crow Head

== Major intersections ==
Location	km	mi	Destinations	Notes
Notre Dame Junction	0.0	0.0	Route 1 (TCH) – Gander, Grand Falls-Windsor	Exit 23 on Route 1; southern terminus
Lewisporte	11.4	7.1	Route 341 north (Main Street) – Downtown, Embree, Laurenceton	Southern terminus of Route 341
Michael's Harbour	21.4	13.3	Main Road - Michael's Harbour	
Michael's Harbour	22.3	13.9	Main Road - Michael's Harbour	
Campbellton	28.5	17.7	Route 343 north (Road to Comfort Cove) – Comfort Cove-Newstead	Southern terminus of Route 343
Baytona	40.8	25.4	Main Street (Route 340-17) - Baytona	
Birchy Bay	44.0	27.3	Main Street - Birchy Bay	
Birchy Bay	47.4	29.5	Main Street - Birchy Bay	
Boyd's Cove	56.7	35.2	Route 331 east (Boyd's Cove Highway) – Clarke's Head, Victoria Cove	Western terminus of Route 331; provides access to Fogo Island and Change Islands via Route 335
Summerford	72.6	45.1	Route 344 west (Main Street) – Summerford, Cottlesville	Eastern terminus of Route 344
Virgin Arm-Carter's Cove	75.7	47.0	Route 345 north – Moreton's Harbour, Tizzard's Harbour	Southern terminus of Route 345
Parkview	76.7	47.7	Parkview Road - Parkview	
Parkview	77.1	47.9	Dildo Run Provincial Park main entrance	Access road into park
Fairbanks-Hillgrade	81.9	50.9	Fairbanks Road (Route 340-29) - Fairbanks	
Fairbanks-Hillgrade	83.3	51.8	Country Road - Hillgrade	
Newville	85.7	53.3	Country Road - Hillgrade	
Newville	86.0	53.4	Newville Road - Newville	
	87.4	54.3	Route 346 north (Toogood Arm Road) – Cobb's Arm, Toogood Arm	Southern terminus of Route 346
Indian Cove	88.6	55.1	Herring Neck Road (Route 340-37) - Herring Neck, Salt Harbour	
Indian Cove	89.0	55.3	Indian Cove Road (Route 340-73) - Indian Cove	
Black Duck Cove	91.6	56.9	Black Duck Cove Road - Black Duck Cove	
Purcell's Harbour	92.6	57.5	Bayview Street (Route 340-46) - Kettle Cove, Bayview	
Purcell's Harbour	93.0	57.8	Purcell's Harbour Road - Purcell's Harbour	
Purcell's Harbour	93.5	58.1	Purcell's Harbour Road - Purcell's Harbour	
Little Harbour	94.6	58.8	Little Harbour Road (Route 340-49) - Little Harbour	
Little Harbour	95.8	59.5	Little Harbour Road (Route 340-49) - Little Harbour	
Twillingate	99.5	61.8	Main Street - Durrell	
Crow Head	106.3	66.1	Dead End at Long Point Lighthouse	Northern terminus
1.000 mi = 1.609 km; 1.000 km = 0.621 mi
