= Newfoundland and Labrador Route 345 =

Highway in Newfoundland and Labrador, Canada

Route 345

Route information
- Maintained by Newfoundland and Labrador Department of Transportation and Infrastructure
- Length: 16.1 km (10.0 mi)

Major junctions
- South end: Route 340 in Virgin Arm–Carter's Cove
- North end: Tizzard's Harbour

Location
- Country: Canada
- Province: Newfoundland and Labrador

Highway system
- Highways in Newfoundland and Labrador
← Route 344	→ Route 346

Route 345 is a 16.1-kilometre-long (10.0 mi) north-south highway on New World Island in the Canadian province of Newfoundland and Labrador. It connects the communities of Virgin Arm–Carter's Cove with Tizzard's Harbour on the western half of the island.

== Route description ==
Route 345 begins in Virgin Arm–Carter's Cove at an intersection with Route 340 (Road to the Isles). It winds its way west through town before leaving and heading northwest through rural areas to pass through Chanceport. The highway now winds its way through wooded and hilly terrain for several kilometres to come to an intersection with a spur road leading to Bridgeport, where it turns north to enter Moreton's Harbour. Route 345 has an intersection with a road leading to Valley Pond before winding its way northeast through town. It heads northeast through rural areas for several more kilometres to enter Tizzard's Harbour, where it comes to an end at the centre of town.

== Major intersections ==
Location	km	mi	Destinations	Notes
Virgin Arm-Carter's Cove	0.0	0.0	Route 340 (Road to the Isles) to Route 1 (TCH) – Twillingate, Summerford, Lewisporte	Southern terminus
	9.1	5.7	Bridgeport Road (Route 345-17) - Bridgeport	
Moreton's Harbour	10.3	6.4	Valley Pond Road (Route 345-20) - Valley Pond	
Tizzard's Harbour	16.1	10.0	Main Street	Northern terminus
1.000 mi = 1.609 km; 1.000 km = 0.621 mi
