= Newfoundland and Labrador Route 346 =

Highway in Newfoundland and Labrador, Canada

Route 346
- Toogood Arm Road
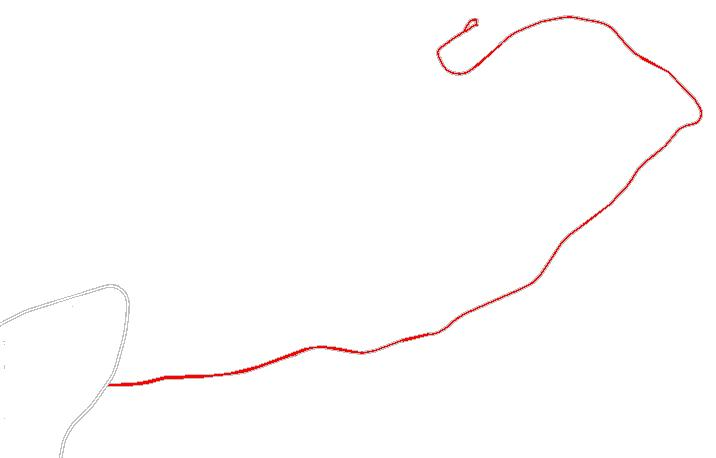

Route information
- Maintained by Newfoundland and Labrador Department of Transportation and Infrastructure
- Length: 13.5 km (8.4 mi)

Major junctions
- South end: Route 340 near Newville
- North end: Toogood Arm

Location
- Country: Canada
- Province: Newfoundland and Labrador

Highway system
- Highways in Newfoundland and Labrador
← Route 345	→ Route 350

Route 346, also known as Toogood Arm, is a highway in the province of Newfoundland and Labrador, Canada and leads from Route 340 (Road to the Isles) near Newville to Toogood Arm, all on New World Island. The highway runs for 13.5 kilometres (8.4 mi) and connects the communities of Cobb's Arm, Roger's Cove, Pike's Arm, Green Cove and Toogood Arm to Route 340.

== Route description ==
Route 346 begins near Newville at an intersection with Route 340 (Road to the Isles) and it heads northeast through wooded and hilly terrain for several kilometres to pass through Cobb's Arm, where it has an intersection with a local road leading to Roger's Cove. The highway now curves to the northwest to meet a local road leading to Pike's Arm and Green Cove before entering Toogood Arm and coming to an end at a Cul-de-sac.

== Major intersections ==
Location	km	mi	Destinations	Notes
	0.0	0.0	Route 340 (Road to the Isles) to Route 1 (TCH) – Twillingate, Summerford, Lewisporte	Southern terminus
Cobb's Arm	7.5	4.7	Rodgers Cove Road (Route 346-13) - Roger's Cove	
	10.6	6.6	Pike's Arm Road (Route 346-10) - Pike's Arm, Green Cove	
Toogood Arm	13.5	8.4	cul-de-sac	Northern terminus
1.000 mi = 1.609 km; 1.000 km = 0.621 mi

== See also ==
- List of Newfoundland and Labrador highways
