= Toogood Arm =

Too Good Arm: Too Good's Arm; Too Good Arm
- A view of Too Good Arm

- Location of Too Good Arm in Newfoundland
- Coordinates: 49°37′52″N 54°36′5″W
- Country: Canada
- Province: Newfoundland and Labrador
- Census division: Division No. 8

Government
  - MHA: Derek Bennett (Lewisporte-Twillingate)
  - MP: Scott Simms (Coast of Bays—Central—Notre Dame)
- Time zone: UTC-3:30 (Newfoundland Standard Time Zone)
  - Summer (DST): UTC-2:30 (Newfoundland Daylight Time)
- Postal Code: A0G 2R0
- Area code: 709
- Highways: Highway 346

Too Good Arm is an outport located on New World Island in the province of Newfoundland and Labrador, Canada. It neighbours the communities of Green Cove, Pike's Arm and Cobbs Arm and is a terminus of Route 346.

== History ==
Sometimes regarded as part of nearby Herring Neck in early records, Too Good Arm was first occupied by European settlers in the early 1800s; by 1840 the Hurley family were noted as living there. The name Too Good Arm first appears in church records in the 1870s.

According to the 1921 Census, there were 93 people living in Too Good Arm, a mix of Anglican, Methodist, Salvation Army, and Roman Catholics, with prominent names being Miles, Tuffin, Blake, Bath, Burton, Russell, and Hurley (with all of the Hurley family comprising the Roman Catholic population). A small Roman Catholic cemetery in the community contains one headstone with the name Naomi Hurley (buried in 1958) with local oral history holding that Susannah Hurley and Martin Hurley may also be buried there.

The community's first postmistress was Gladys B. Bath.

In 1994, two years after the Government of Canada declared a moratorium on the Atlantic cod fishery, an inshore fisherman from Toogood Arm became the first Newfoundlander in history to be charged for jigging cod to feed his family.

== Alternative Spellings ==
"Toogood Arm", "Toogood's Arm" and "Too Good Arm" are variants of the community's name. The original is likely a surname that was common in southwest England at the time of settlement. Toogood, however, is neither a prominent nor recognizable surname in Notre Dame Bay. "Too Good Arm" likely evolved as a grammatically correct variant.

When contacted in 2006, former Minister of Transportation and Works (TW) John Hickey asserted that "the spelling of the community as outlined in the Newfoundland Gazette is in fact ‘Toogood Arm’". He then suggested that if the TW department were to receive an official request from the local service district, he would "have the Department change the signage [to Too Good Arm] to reflect the community’s wishes."

As of 2019, the official signage upon entering the community showed "Too Good Arm".

== Services ==
Supermarkets are located in Virgin Arm and Twillingate, approximately 24 kilometres (15 mi) and 22 kilometers (13.5 mi) away by road, respectively. Residents generally travel to Twillingate, Lewisporte or Gander for shopping.

High speed internet (DSL) and landline telephone service are provided by Bell Aliant. One over-the-air channel (NTV) is available.

Direct broadcast satellite signals intended for Shaw Direct and Bell Satellite TV set-top boxes can be received, while cellular phone coverage is provided by Bell Aliant, TELUS and other carriers.

Distance To:

Twillingate: 25 km- 23 mins

Lewisporte: 92 km - 1 hour 17 mins

Gander: 113 km - 1 hour 33 mins

Grand Falls Windsor: 150 km - 1 hour 52 mins

Corner Brook: 412 km - 4 hours 32 mins

St. John's: 444 km 4 hours 48 mins

Port Aux Basque: 626 km - 6 hours 39 mins

St. Anthony: 772 km - 8 hours 37 mins

== See also ==
- List of communities in Newfoundland and Labrador
