= Comfort Cove-Newstead =

- Town
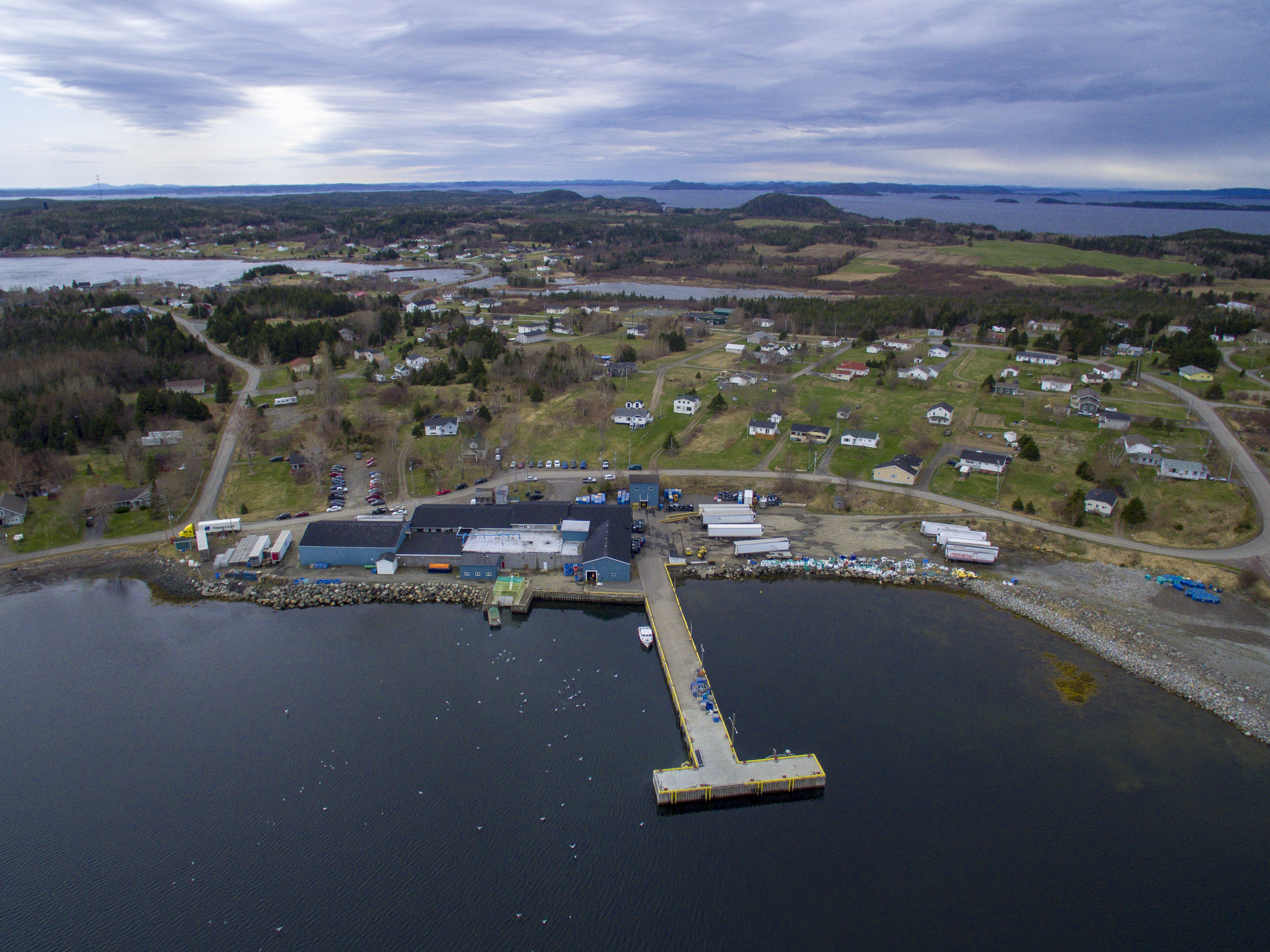
- Aerial view featuring the fish plant, the major employer of the community.

- Location of Comfort Cove-Newstead in Newfoundland
- Coordinates: 49°23′57.50″N 54°51′51.09″W
- Country: Canada
- Province: Newfoundland and Labrador

Government
  - Mayor: Christopher (Chris) Head

Area
  - Total: 29.83 km^{2} (11.52 sq mi)
- Elevation: 11 m (36 ft)

Population (2021)
  - Total: 345
- Time zone: UTC-3:30 (Newfoundland Time)
  - Summer (DST): UTC-2:30 (Newfoundland Daylight)
- Area code: 709
- Highways: Route 343

Comfort Cove-Newstead is a small fishing community located outside Campbellton, on the east coast of Newfoundland and Labrador, Canada, (on the Bay of Exploits).

It has a recently renovated town hall, a fire department, a corner store with post office, two churches, and other services including a fish processing plant and a vegetable farm.

There are many services such as a playground, town hall, community center, fish plant, fire hall, local store, vegetable farm and more. The children in this town, along with those from Campbellton, Birchy Bay, Baytona, Loon Bay and Michaels Harbour attend a k-9 school in the Campbellton and high school in Lewisporte.

There are about 248 private dwellings, in Comfort Cove-Newstead, covering a land area of about 29.83 square km. There is a Salvation Army place of worship, a United Church, and Cull's Point Cemetery there.

== Demographics ==
In the 2021 Census of Population conducted by Statistics Canada, Comfort Cove-Newstead had a population of 345 living in 160 of its 247 total private dwellings, a change of −15.2% from its 2016 population of 407. With a land area of 29.97 km^{2} (11.57 sq mi), it had a population density of 11.5/km^{2} (29.8/sq mi) in 2021.

== Climate ==
Climate data for Comfort Cove-Newstead
Month	Jan	Feb	Mar	Apr	May	Jun	Jul	Aug	Sep	Oct	Nov	Dec	Year
Record high °C (°F)	12.4 (54.3)	12.5 (54.5)	15.6 (60.1)	22 (72)	28.2 (82.8)	32 (90)	33.3 (91.9)	33.3 (91.9)	27.5 (81.5)	23.9 (75.0)	20 (68)	15 (59)	33.3 (91.9)
Mean daily maximum °C (°F)	−3.1 (26.4)	−3.3 (26.1)	0.3 (32.5)	5 (41)	11.2 (52.2)	17.2 (63.0)	21.8 (71.2)	20.3 (68.5)	15.5 (59.9)	9.5 (49.1)	4.5 (40.1)	−0.6 (30.9)	8.2 (46.8)
Daily mean °C (°F)	−7.3 (18.9)	−7.7 (18.1)	−4 (25)	1.2 (34.2)	6.4 (43.5)	11.6 (52.9)	16.3 (61.3)	15.5 (59.9)	11 (52)	5.6 (42.1)	1.3 (34.3)	−4.2 (24.4)	3.8 (38.8)
Mean daily minimum °C (°F)	−11.7 (10.9)	−12.3 (9.9)	−8.4 (16.9)	−2.8 (27.0)	1.6 (34.9)	6.1 (43.0)	10.9 (51.6)	10.5 (50.9)	6.4 (43.5)	1.7 (35.1)	−2.1 (28.2)	−8 (18)	−0.7 (30.7)
Record low °C (°F)	−27.2 (−17.0)	−32.2 (−26.0)	−27.5 (−17.5)	−14 (7)	−8.3 (17.1)	−2.5 (27.5)	0.6 (33.1)	3.9 (39.0)	−2.2 (28.0)	−6.2 (20.8)	−15.7 (3.7)	−26.1 (−15.0)	−32.2 (−26.0)
Average precipitation mm (inches)	100 (3.9)	91.7 (3.61)	99.9 (3.93)	87.7 (3.45)	86.6 (3.41)	81.5 (3.21)	81.8 (3.22)	105.1 (4.14)	94.5 (3.72)	108.5 (4.27)	103.7 (4.08)	102.2 (4.02)	1,143.1 (45.00)
Source: 1961–1990 Environment Canada
