= Indian Cove =

Local service district in Canada

Coordinates: 49°35′56″N 54°40′31″W

Indian Cove is a local service district and designated place in the Canadian province of Newfoundland and Labrador. It is just off Route 340 on New World Island. It is the last community before crossing the causeway to Twillingate. Before the construction of the causeway, there was a ferry that ran from Indian Cove to Twillingate. Education is provided by New World Island Academy in Summerford and grocery shopping can be done in nearby Twillingate.

== Geography ==
Indian Cove is in Newfoundland within Subdivision H of Division No. 8.

== Demographics ==
As a designated place in the 2016 Census of Population conducted by Statistics Canada, Indian Cove recorded a population of 65 living in 23 of its 30 total private dwellings, a change of 0% from its 2011 population of 65. With a land area of 2.13 km^{2} (0.82 sq mi), it had a population density of 30.5/km^{2} (79.0/sq mi) in 2016.

== Government ==
Indian Cove is a local service district (LSD) that is governed by a committee responsible for the provision of certain services to the community. The chair of the LSD committee is Sheldon Hollett.

== See also ==
- List of communities in Newfoundland and Labrador
- List of designated places in Newfoundland and Labrador
- List of local service districts in Newfoundland and Labrador
