= Newfoundland and Labrador Route 344 =

Highway in Newfoundland and Labrador, Canada

Route 344

Route information
- Maintained by Newfoundland and Labrador Department of Transportation and Infrastructure
- Length: 8.2 km (5.1 mi)

Major junctions
- East end: Route 340 in Summerford
- West end: Cottlesville

Location
- Country: Canada
- Province: Newfoundland and Labrador

Highway system
- Highways in Newfoundland and Labrador
← Route 343	→ Route 345

Route 344 is a minor highway located on New World Island in the Canadian province of Newfoundland and Labrador. It starts at its eastern terminus at an intersection on Route 340 (Road to the Isles), in the town of Summerford, and ends at its western terminus, the town of Cottlesville.

== Major intersections ==
Location	km	mi	Destinations	Notes
Summerford	0.0	0.0	Route 340 (Road to the Isles) to Route 1 (TCH) – Twillingate, Boyd's Cove, Lewisporte	Eastern terminus
Cottlesville	8.2	5.1	Dead End	Western terminus
1.000 mi = 1.609 km; 1.000 km = 0.621 mi
