= Trump Islands (Newfoundland and Labrador) =

Island group in Newfoundland and Labrador, Canada

- Location within Newfoundland

Geography
- Location: Notre Dame Bay
- Coordinates: 49°34′30″N 54°46′09″W

Administration
- Canada
- Province: Newfoundland and Labrador
- Census division: No. 8
- Subdivision: H

Trump Islands are two small islands located in Notre Dame Bay within census division No. 8, Newfoundland and Labrador, Canada.

The uninhabited islands are noted for their mineral wealth.

== Description ==
The Trump Islands are two uninhabited islands, North Trump Island and South Trump Island, located on the western side of Friday Bay, within the larger Notre Dame Bay. They are surrounded by several small islets, and are separated from each other by Trump Island Tickle, a rock-and-islet-filled channel.

North Trump Island is 1.6 km (1 mi) long with a peak elevation of 76 m (249 ft), and South Trump Island is 2 km (1.2 mi) long with a peak elevation of 63 m (207 ft).

Tizzard's Harbour is 1.7 km (1.1 mi) northwest of the Trump Islands, and Dildo Run Provincial Park is 3.7 km (2.3 mi) south. Small vessels can anchor at Fools Harbour, at the eastern end of South Trump Island.

== History ==
Exploration of the Trump Islands did not occur until about 1862, when deposits of chalcopyrite and high-grade copper-cobalt ore were discovered by fishermen from Tizzard's Harbour. A small mining and fishing village was then established on the northern end of North Trump Island. Folklorists have speculated that the name of the islands was inspired by the card game term referring to a winning suit.

The copper mining deposits ran dry by 1869, but several other families from Tizzard's Harbour moved there in the 1870's and pursued the inshore fishery. The community of Trump Island had a peak population of 67 in 1901. As fishing was difficult due to the rocks surrounding the islands, the community's population declined, and it was eventually abandoned before Newfoundland's confederation with Canada in 1949. The islands are now primarily a recreational site for the residents of Twillingate and the surrounding communities, and over 15 to 20 cabins have been built in the area.

Further deposits of other minerals, including gold, pyrite, pyrrhotite, silver, and sulphide, were discovered in a 1999 geological survey. In 2017, King's Bay Resources acquired mining rights to most of North Trump Island.

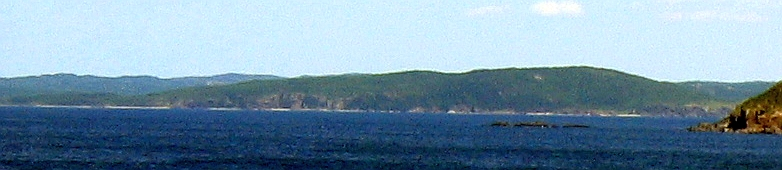
North Trump Island
