= Trump Islands =

Trump Islands may refer to:

- Trump Islands (Newfoundland and Labrador)
- Trump Islands (Antarctica)

== See also ==
- Super Solitaire, a Super Nintendo Entertainment System video game released in Japan as Trump Island
