= Ralph T. Pastore =

Canadian Historian and Archaeologist

Ralph Thomas Pastore (d. February 1, 2002) was a historian and archaeologist, who taught at the Memorial University of Newfoundland, St. John's NFLD, and was best known as the scholar who discovered the Boyd's Cove Beothuk settlement.

Pastore was a native of Ballston Spa, New York, and was educated at the University of Notre Dame. He joined the History Department at Memorial University of Newfoundland, where he developed courses in the ethnohistory of North American Native People. Starting in 1980 he surveyed Notre Dame Bay of the island of Newfoundland and identified a number of archaeological sites. The most important of these was located near the community of Boyd's Cove and was identified as a seventeenth-century Beothuk site. Excavation of the site under Pastore's direction revealed much about the lives of the Beothuk. An interpretation centre has been built near the site.

His work Shanawdithit's People was published in 1994.

He was married with two children.

The Dr. Ralph Pastore Pioneer Scholarship is named after him.
