= Newfoundland and Labrador Route 343 =

Highway in Newfoundland and Labrador, Canada

Route 343
- Road to Comfort Cove

Route information
- Maintained by Newfoundland and Labrador Department of Transportation and Infrastructure
- Length: 15.6 km (9.7 mi)

Major junctions
- South end: Route 340 in Campbellton
- North end: Comfort Cove-Newstead

Location
- Country: Canada
- Province: Newfoundland and Labrador

Highway system
- Highways in Newfoundland and Labrador
← Route 342	→ Route 344

Route 343, also known as Road to Comfort Cove, is a short north–south highway that leads from Route 340 (Road to the Isles) just east of Campbellton to Comfort Cove-Newstead on the northern coast of the island of Newfoundland in the Canadian province of Newfoundland and Labrador. It is a relatively short highway with no towns on the route other than Comfort Cove-Newstead. As with most highways in Newfoundland and Labrador, it is entirely a two-lane highway.

== Major intersections ==
Location	km	mi	Destinations	Notes
Campbellton	0.0	0.0	Route 340 (Road to the Isles) to Route 1 (TCH) – Lewisporte, Summerford, Twillingate	Southern terminus
Comfort Cove-Newstead	15.6	9.7	Dead End	Northern terminus
1.000 mi = 1.609 km; 1.000 km = 0.621 mi

== See also ==
- List of Newfoundland and Labrador highways
