= Gander Bay North, Newfoundland and Labrador =

Human settlement in Canada

Coordinates: 49.367°N 54.508°W

Location of Gander Bay North in Newfoundland and Labrador

Gander Bay North is a local service district and designated place in the Canadian province of Newfoundland and Labrador.

== Geography ==
Gander Bay North is in Newfoundland within Subdivision L of Division No. 8.

== Demographics ==
As a designated place in the 2016 Census of Population conducted by Statistics Canada, Gander Bay North recorded a population of 853 living in 372 of its 456 total private dwellings, a change of 0.5% from its 2011 population of 849. With a land area of 37.84 km^{2} (14.61 sq mi), it had a population density of 22.5/km^{2} (58.4/sq mi) in 2016.

== Government ==
Gander Bay North is a local service district (LSD) that is governed by a committee responsible for the provision of certain services to the community. The chair of the LSD committee is Thomas Gillingham.

== See also ==
- List of communities in Newfoundland and Labrador
- List of designated places in Newfoundland and Labrador
- List of local service districts in Newfoundland and Labrador
