= Merritt's Harbour =

Local service district in Canada

Coordinates: 49°37′55″N 54°39′00″W

Merritt's Harbour is a local service district and designated place in the Canadian province of Newfoundland and Labrador. It is located near Herring Neck, on New World Island, a few kilometers south of the causeway to Twillingate.

== Geography ==
Merritt's Harbour is in Newfoundland within Subdivision H of Division No. 8.

== Demographics ==
As a designated place in the 2016 Census of Population conducted by Statistics Canada, Merritt's Harbour recorded a population of 38 living in 18 of its 26 total private dwellings, a change of 5.6% from its 2011 population of 36. With a land area of 2.33 km^{2} (0.90 sq mi), it had a population density of 16.3/km^{2} (42.2/sq mi) in 2016.

== Government ==
Merritt's Harbour is a local service district (LSD) that is governed by a committee responsible for the provision of certain services to the community. The chair of the LSD committee is Lindsay Card.

== See also ==
- List of communities in Newfoundland and Labrador
- List of designated places in Newfoundland and Labrador
- List of local service districts in Newfoundland and Labrador
