= Strong's Island =

Island in Newfoundland and Labrador, Canada

Coordinates: 49.48293°N 54.78318°W

Location of Strong's Island in Newfoundland

Strong's Island is an island in the Bay of Exploits, just off the coast of Newfoundland in the Canadian province of Newfoundland and Labrador.

The island measures 0.45 square miles and is connected to New World Island by a 150 yard long causeway called Island Drive. Strong's Island is a part of the town of Summerford.

== See also ==
- List of islands of Newfoundland and Labrador
