= Boyd's Cove, Newfoundland and Labrador =

Settlement in Newfoundland, Canada

Boyd's Cove
- Former community
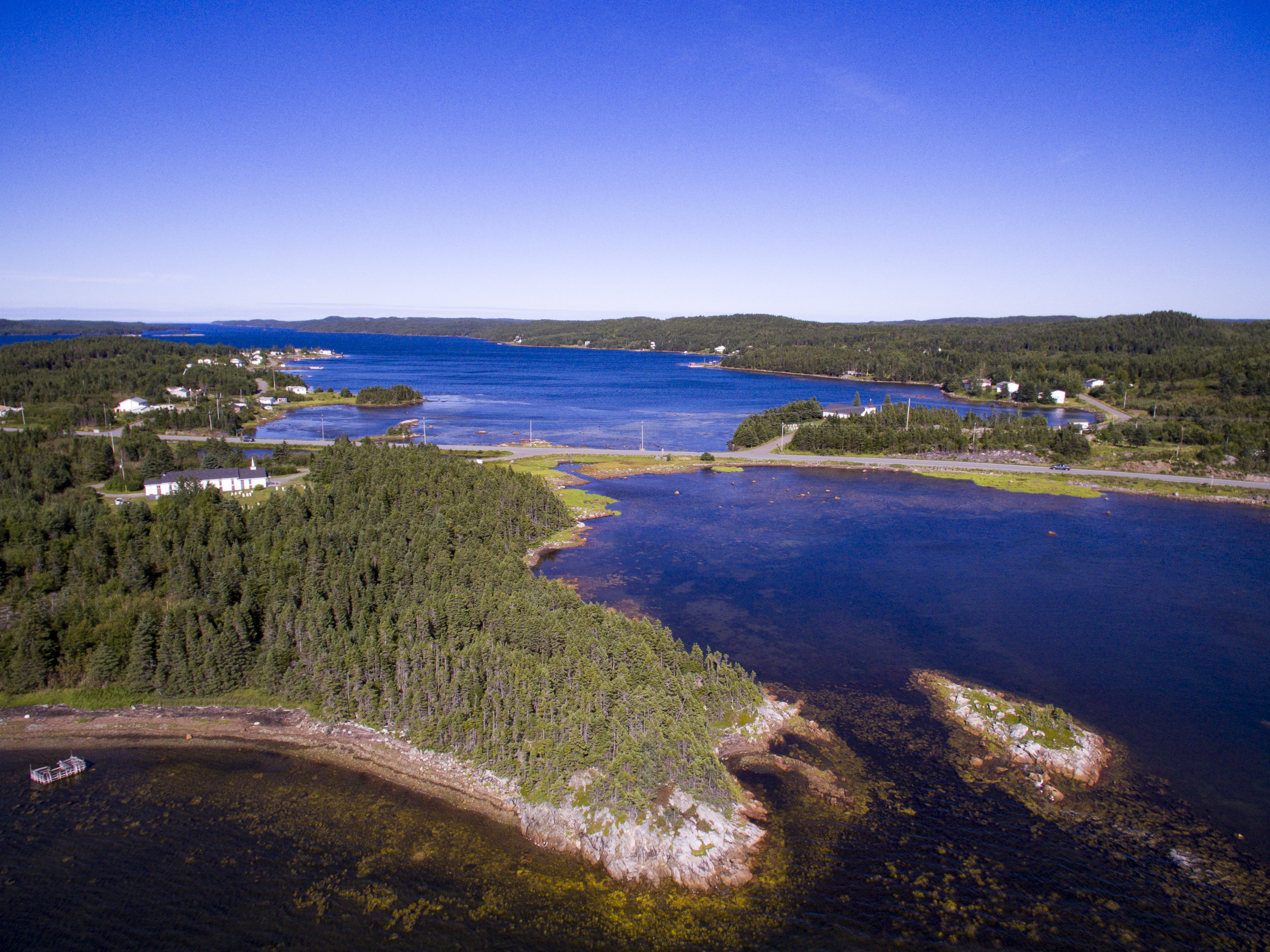
- Harbour of Boyd's Cove

- Location of Hopewell in Newfoundland
- Coordinates: 49°26′36″N 54°39′27″W
- Country: Canada
- Province: Newfoundland and Labrador

Population (2016)
  - Total: 183
- Time zone: UTC-3:30 (Newfoundland Time)
  - Summer (DST): UTC-2:30 (Newfoundland Daylight)
- Area code: 709

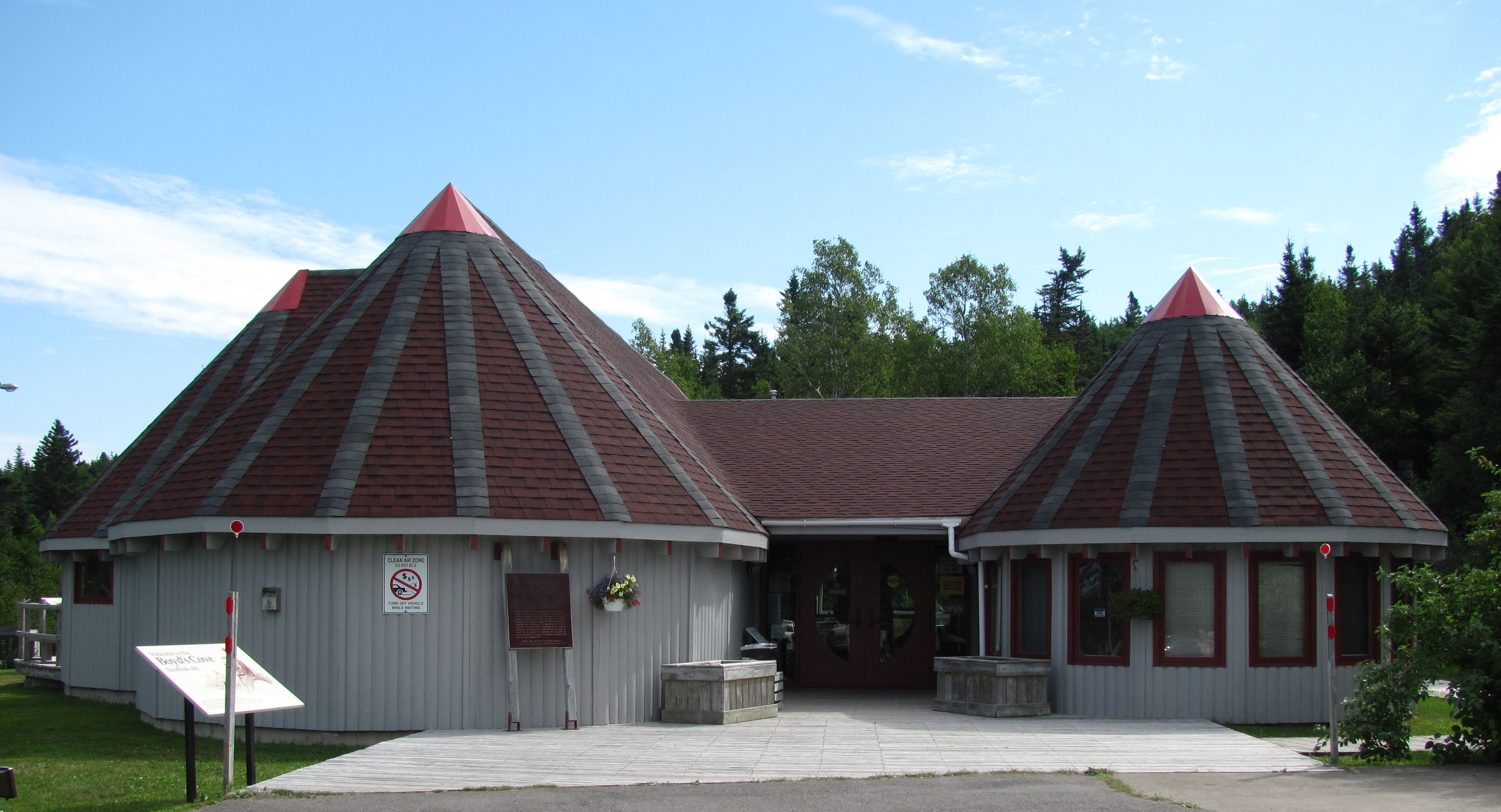
Boyd's Cove Beothuk Site Museum

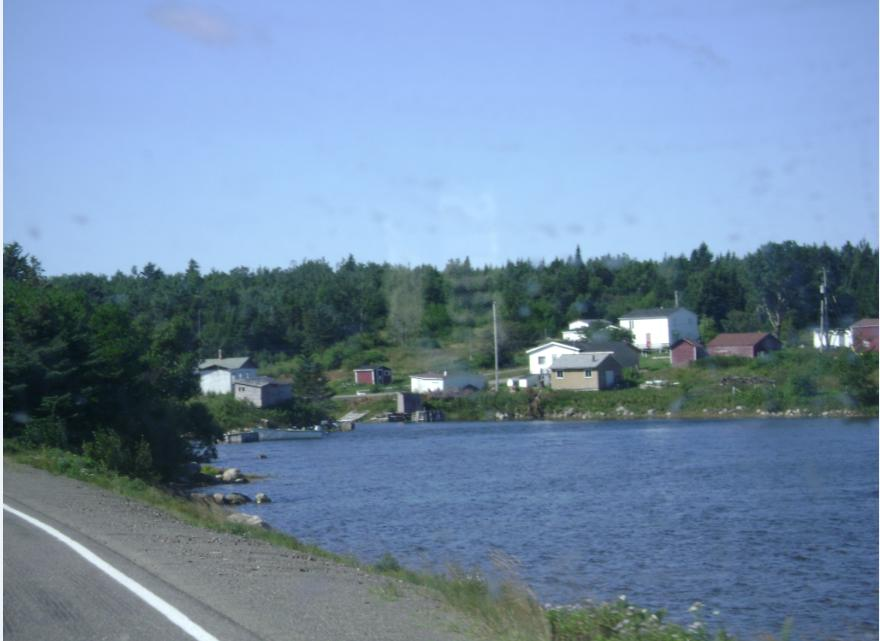
Homes in the community

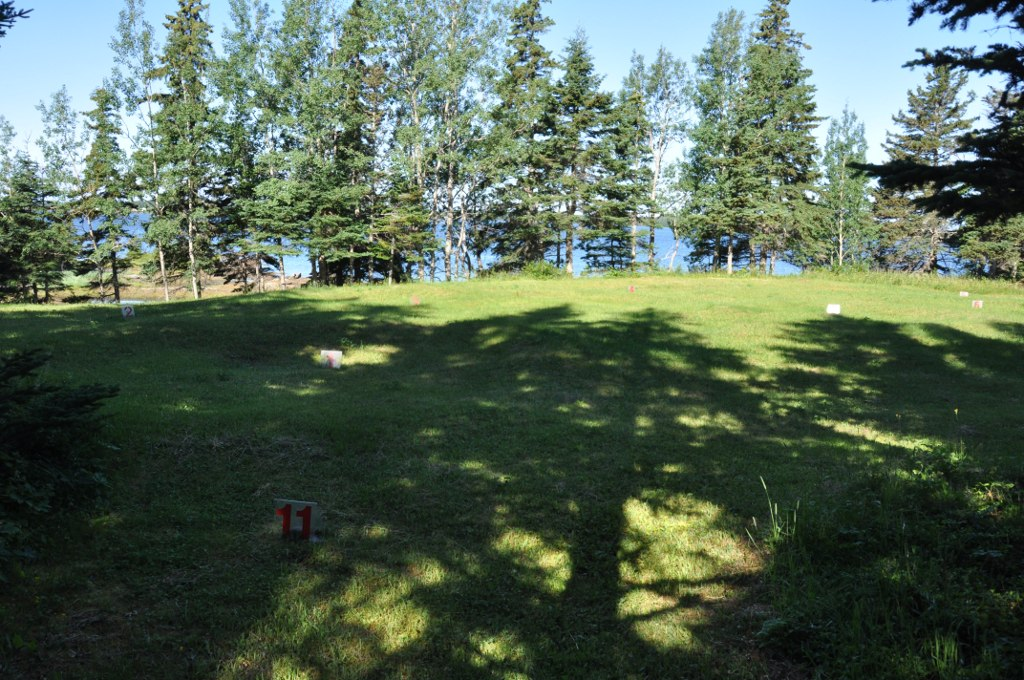
Archeological site

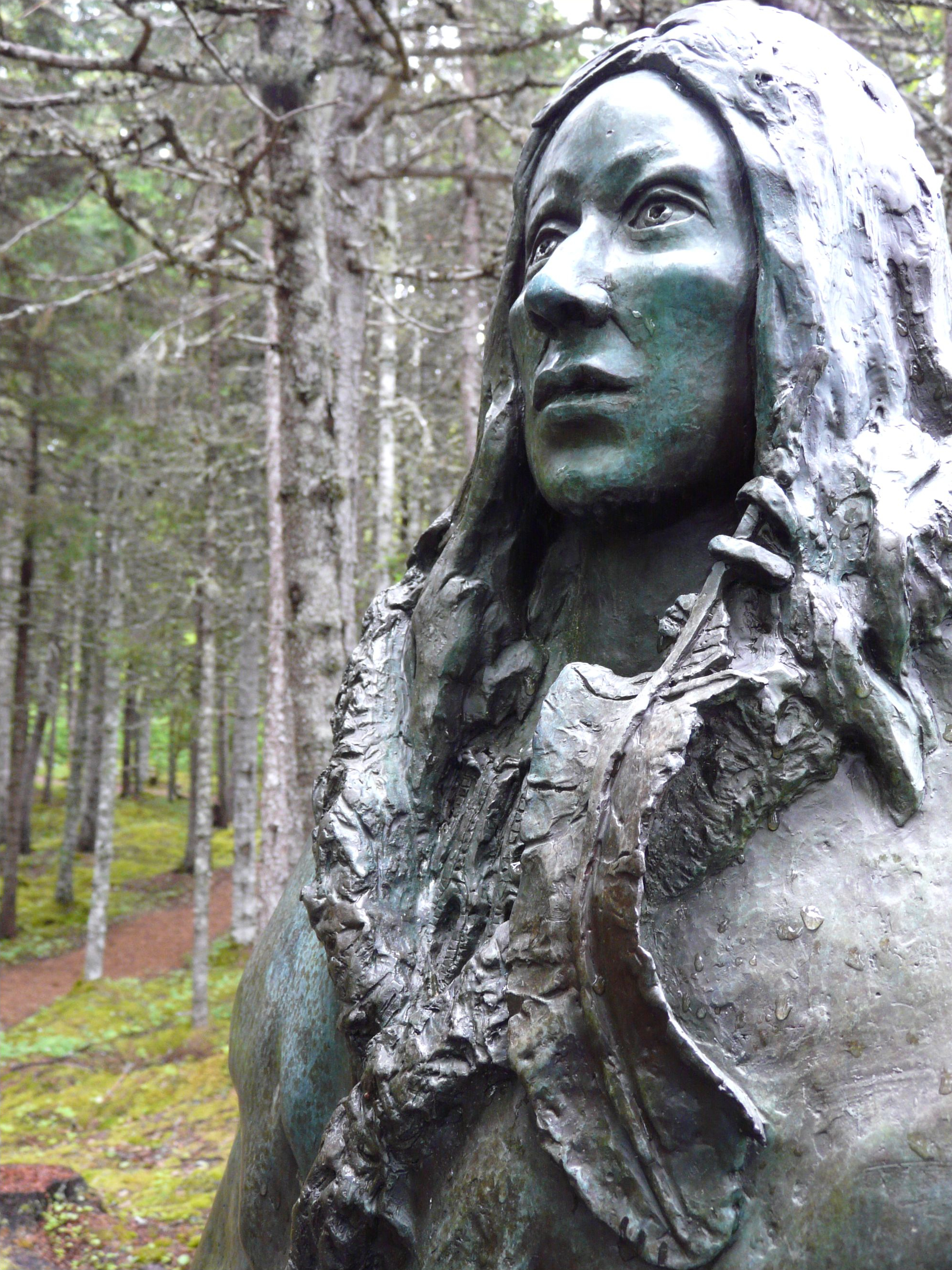
Statue of Shanawdithit in Boyd's Cove

Boyd's Cove, also known as Boyd's Harbour, is a local service district and designated place in the Canadian province of Newfoundland and Labrador that is near Lewisporte. There is an interpretive centre dedicated to the earlier indigenous Beothuk settlement at this location.

== History ==
Boyd's Cove was first settled by the Beothuks in the late 18th century. During the summer months, the people lived by the cove in wigwams built over shallow excavations in the ground. As well as more traditional activities, the group scavenged metal items left behind at French and English summer fishing camps, and refashioned these for their own use. Although these indigenous people didn't interact with European traders as much as most native peoples, some of the Beothuk were killed by encroaching settlers, and researchers have concluded that the group later died out partly because of exposure to disease and partly because of starvation, which in turn was caused both by the resulting poor health and by limited access to resources after European settlement.

A settlement at Boyd's Cove was later established by the Freake, Newman and Robinson families from Fogo Island in the late 19th century. Settlers also came from the Change Islands to settle at the cove, on the mainland. At first Boyd's Cove was a logging and fishing community; later it became a producer of turnip, carrot, potato and hay in the Notre Dame Bay area. Because of its sheltered location on the shoreline, the village often hosted residents from the more exposed fishing villages in the winter.

The rugged landscape and climate meant that survival there was often a struggle; with the nearest hospital in Lewisporte, NL, nearly 1½ hours away by horse in the 1920s and 1930s, medical care was often unavailable. If there was a serious illness, such as tuberculosis, residents would have to go to St. John's.

== Geography ==
Boyd's Cove is in Newfoundland within Subdivision G of Division No. 8. Boyd's Cove is located in the North Shore Forest ecoregion. The shoreline is sheltered by nearby large islands. Route 340 passes through Boyd's Cove, then crosses a causeway on the way to Twillingate.

== Demographics ==
As a designated place in the 2016 Census of Population conducted by Statistics Canada, Boyd's Cove recorded a population of 183 living in 90 of its 131 total private dwellings, a change of −3.7% from its 2011 population of 190. With a land area of 6.46 km^{2} (2.49 sq mi), it had a population density of 28.3/km^{2} (73.4/sq mi) in 2016.

== Attractions ==
The nearby Beothuk interpretive centre hosts educational activities, book launches and ceremonies, and includes Gerald Squires' bronze statue, "The Spirit of the Beothuk".

Archaeological site

A major Beothuk archaeological site at Boyd's Cove was excavated by Dr. Ralph T. Pastore of Memorial University of Newfoundland. in the early 1980s. The site is now home to the Boyd's Cove Interpretation Centre. Archaeological evidence revealed that Boyd's Cove has been occupied intermittently for about 3000 years. Beothuk pit houses dating from the late 17th or the early 18th century have yielded stone tools lying nearby European artifacts. These tools helped to establish a link between the Beothuk and their prehistoric ancestors. Faunal analysis indicated that the site was occupied at least from late winter to fall, and that the Beothuk relied on both marine and land resources for their subsistence. The site was designated a National Historic Site of Canada in 1995.

== Government ==
Boyd's Cove is a local service district (LSD) that is governed by a committee responsible for the provision of certain services to the community. The chair of the LSD committee is Bruce Mercer.

== See also ==
- Beothuk
- List of unincorporated communities in Newfoundland and Labrador
- List of designated places in Newfoundland and Labrador
- List of local service districts in Newfoundland and Labrador
