= List of designated places in Newfoundland and Labrador =

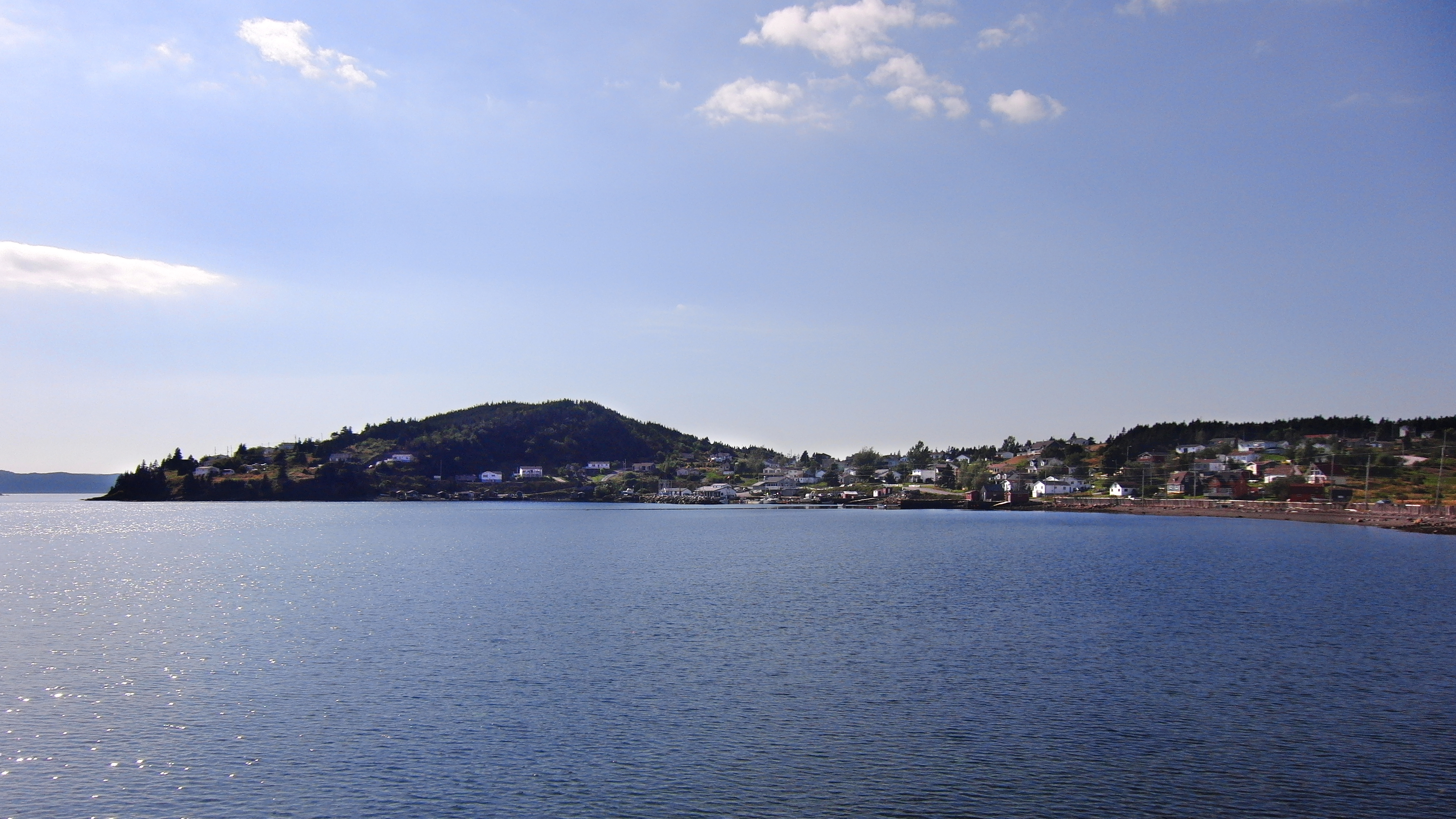
Offshore view of Dildo from Trinity Bay, Newfoundland and Labrador's third most populous designated place

A designated place is a type of geographic unit used by Statistics Canada to disseminate census data. It is usually "a small community that does not meet the criteria used to define incorporated municipalities or Statistics Canada population centres (areas with a population of at least 1,000 and no fewer than 400 persons per square kilometre)." Provincial and territorial authorities collaborate with Statistics Canada in the creation of designated places so that data can be published for sub-areas within municipalities. Starting in 2016, Statistics Canada allowed the overlapping of designated places with population centres.

In the 2021 Census of Population, Newfoundland and Labrador had 207 designated places, an increase from 199 in 2016. Among these designated places are 5 retired population centres. In 2021, the 207 designated places had a cumulative population of 44,012 and an average population of 213. Newfoundland and Labrador's largest designated place is Goulds with a population of 4,441.

== List ==
List of designated places in Newfoundland and Labrador
| Name | Type | Census subdivision | 2021 Census of Population | | | | |
| Name | Type | Census subdivision | Population (2021) | Population (2016) | Change (%) | Land area (km^{2}) | Population density (per km^{2}) |
|---|---|---|---|---|---|---|---|
| Admiral's Cove, Cape Broyle | Designated place | Division No. 1, Subdivision U | 36 | 96 | −62.5% | 1.41 | 25.5/km^{2} |
| Aspen Cove | Designated place | Division No. 8, Subdivision L | 196 | 178 | +10.1% | 2.81 | 69.8/km^{2} |
| Barachois Brook | Designated place | Division No. 4, Subdivision C | 121 | 167 | −27.5% | 6.23 | 19.4/km^{2} |
| Bartletts Harbour | Designated place | Division No. 9, Subdivision C | 105 | 129 | −18.6% | 7.07 | 14.9/km^{2} |
| Bay St. George South | Designated place | Division No. 4, Subdivision B | 1,135 | 1,103 | +2.9% | 117.07 | 9.7/km^{2} |
| Beaches | Designated place | Division No. 5, Subdivision E | 38 | 54 | −29.6% | 1.89 | 20.1/km^{2} |
| Bear Cove, Northern Peninsula | Designated place | Division No. 9, Subdivision C | 92 | 91 | +1.1% | 5.09 | 18.1/km^{2} |
| Beau Bois | Designated place | Division No. 2, Subdivision D | 37 | 41 | −9.8% | 0.98 | 37.8/km^{2} |
| Bellevue | Designated place | Division No. 1, Subdivision A | 272 | 215 | +26.5% | 14.53 | 18.7/km^{2} |
| Bellevue Beach | Designated place | Division No. 1, Subdivision A | 87 | 69 | +26.1% | 6.83 | 12.7/km^{2} |
| Benoits Siding | Designated place | Division No. 4, Subdivision A | 31 | 47 | −34.0% | 2.42 | 12.8/km^{2} |
| Benton | Designated place | Division No. 6, Subdivision E | 145 | 154 | −5.8% | 4.77 | 30.4/km^{2} |
| Birchy Cove | Designated place | Division No. 7, Subdivision G | 25 | 20 | +25.0% | 4.01 | 6.2/km^{2} |
| Biscay Bay | Designated place | Division No. 1, Subdivision V | 35 | 36 | −2.8% | 4.35 | 8.0/km^{2} |
| Black Duck | Designated place | Division No. 4, Subdivisions C and D | 78 | 110 | −29.1% | 19.74 | 4.0/km^{2} |
| Black Duck Brook and Winterhouse | Designated place | Division No. 4, Subdivision E | 121 | 172 | −29.7% | 12.62 | 9.6/km^{2} |
| Black Duck Cove, Northern Peninsula | Designated place | Division No. 9, Subdivision C | 146 | 155 | −5.8% | 1.43 | 102.1/km^{2} |
| Black Tickle-Domino | Designated place | Division No. 10, Subdivision B | 87 | 150 | −42.0% | 7.96 | 10.9/km^{2} |
| Blaketown | Designated place | Division No. 1, Subdivision Y | 619 | 605 | +2.3% | 19.74 | 31.4/km^{2} |
| Bloomfield | Designated place | Division No. 7, Subdivision E | 431 | 523 | −17.6% | 9.84 | 43.8/km^{2} |
| Boat Harbour West | Designated place | Division No. 2, Subdivision C | 73 | 135 | −45.9% | 3.71 | 19.7/km^{2} |
| Boyd's Cove | Designated place | Division No. 8, Subdivision G | 187 | 183 | +2.2% | 6.48 | 28.9/km^{2} |
| Bridgeport | Designated place | Division No. 8, Subdivision H | 99 | 104 | −4.8% | 3.1 | 31.9/km^{2} |
| Brig Bay | Designated place | Division No. 9, Subdivision C | 101 | 117 | −13.7% | 1.56 | 64.7/km^{2} |
| Brigus Junction | Designated place | Division No. 1, Subdivision O | 135 | 155 | −12.9% | 8.27 | 16.3/km^{2} |
| Brigus South | Designated place | Division No. 1, Subdivision U | 76 | 83 | −8.4% | 6.35 | 12.0/km^{2} |
| Bristols Hope | Designated place | Division No. 1, Subdivision I | 300 | 275 | +9.1% | 3.99 | 75.2/km^{2} |
| Britannia | Designated place | Division No. 7, Subdivision L | 175 | 85 | +105.9% | 4.22 | 41.5/km^{2} |
| Brown's Arm | Designated place | Division No. 8, Subdivision F | 390 | 395 | −1.3% | 18.18 | 21.5/km^{2} |
| Buchans Junction | Designated place | Division No. 6, Subdivision A | 61 | 72 | −15.3% | 7.94 | 7.7/km^{2} |
| Bunyan's Cove | Designated place | Division No. 7, Subdivision E | 330 | 457 | −27.8% | 10.36 | 31.9/km^{2} |
| Burgoynes Cove | Designated place | Division No. 7, Subdivision K | 114 | 126 | −9.5% | 12.3 | 9.3/km^{2} |
| Burnside-St. Chads | Designated place | Division No. 7, Subdivision D | 79 | 95 | −16.8% | 16.08 | 4.9/km^{2} |
| Burnt Cove, St. Michael's, Bauline South | Designated place | Division No. 1, Subdivision U | 260 | 316 | −17.7% | 8.64 | 30.1/km^{2} |
| Burnt Point-Gull Island-Northern Bay | Designated place | Division No. 1, Subdivision G | 508 | 546 | −7.0% | 12.62 | 40.3/km^{2} |
| Calvert | Designated place | Division No. 1, Subdivision U | 196 | 219 | −10.5% | 5.47 | 35.8/km^{2} |
| Campbells Creek | Designated place | Division No. 4, Subdivision D | 76 | 113 | −32.7% | 2.61 | 29.1/km^{2} |
| Canning's Cove | Designated place | Division No. 7, Subdivision E | 157 | 231 | −32.0% | 4.51 | 34.8/km^{2} |
| Cape Freels North | Designated place | Division No. 7, Subdivision A | 100 | 128 | −21.9% | 4.3 | 23.3/km^{2} |
| Cape Ray | Designated place | Division No. 3, Subdivision H | 249 | 337 | −26.1% | 17.96 | 13.9/km^{2} |
| Caplin Cove-Southport | Designated place | Division No. 7, Subdivision M | 653 | 687 | −4.9% | 26.34 | 24.8/km^{2} |
| Capstan Island | Designated place | Division No. 10, Subdivision A | 55 | 41 | +34.1% | 9.09 | 6.1/km^{2} |
| Castor River North | Designated place | Division No. 9, Subdivision C | 124 | 141 | −12.1% | 2.2 | 56.4/km^{2} |
| Castor River South | Designated place | Division No. 9, Subdivision C | 107 | 136 | −21.3% | 6.73 | 15.9/km^{2} |
| Cavendish | Designated place | Division No. 1, Subdivision E | 323 | 301 | +7.3% | 2.66 | 121.4/km^{2} |
| Champneys-English Harbour | Designated place | Division No. 7, Subdivision J | 116 | 149 | −22.1% | 11.95 | 9.7/km^{2} |
| Chanceport | Designated place | Division No. 8, Subdivision H | 30 | 38 | −21.1% | 1.51 | 19.9/km^{2} |
| Charlottetown, B. Bay | Designated place | Division No. 7, Subdivision E | 446 | 251 | +77.7% | 2.99 | 149.2/km^{2} |
| Cobbs Arm | Designated place | Division No. 8, Subdivision H | 129 | 119 | +8.4% | 5.15 | 25.0/km^{2} |
| Codroy | Designated place | Division No. 4, Subdivision A | 258 | 284 | −9.2% | 6.38 | 40.4/km^{2} |
| Cottrell's Cove | Designated place | Division No. 8, Subdivision E | 124 | 123 | +0.8% | 36.02 | 3.4/km^{2} |
| Croque | Designated place | Division No. 9, Subdivision F | 45 | 51 | −11.8% | 3.46 | 13.0/km^{2} |
| Deadman's Bay | Designated place | Division No. 8, Subdivision M | 126 | 130 | −3.1% | 12.32 | 10.2/km^{2} |
| Deep Bay | Designated place | Fogo Island | 67 | 83 | −19.3% | 6.5 | 10.3/km^{2} |
| Deep Bight | Designated place | Division No. 7, Subdivision M | 271 | 186 | +45.7% | 15.23 | 17.8/km^{2} |
| Diamond Cove | Designated place | Division No. 3, Subdivision J | 38 | 46 | −17.4% | 2.42 | 15.7/km^{2} |
| Dildo | Designated place | Division No. 1, Subdivision E | 803 | 943 | −14.8% | 5.55 | 144.7/km^{2} |
| Doyles | Designated place | Division No. 4, Subdivision A | 48 | 43 | +11.6% | 3.8 | 12.6/km^{2} |
| Dunfield | Designated place | Division No. 7, Subdivision J | 120 | 78 | +53.8% | 1.81 | 66.3/km^{2} |
| Eddies Cove West | Designated place | Division No. 9, Subdivision G | 30 | 36 | −16.7% | 18.07 | 1.7/km^{2} |
| Epworth-Great Salmonier | Designated place | Division No. 2, Subdivision E | 141 | 177 | −20.3% | 8.17 | 17.3/km^{2} |
| Fairbanks-Hillgrade | Designated place | Division No. 8, Subdivision H | 143 | 253 | −43.5% | 9.52 | 15.0/km^{2} |
| Fairhaven | Designated place | Division No. 1, Subdivision A | 55 | 85 | −35.3% | 5.85 | 9.4/km^{2} |
| Flat Bay | Designated place | Division No. 4, Subdivision C | 162 | 210 | −22.9% | 4.29 | 37.8/km^{2} |
| Forest Field-New Bridge | Designated place | Division No. 1, Subdivision W | 46 | 52 | −11.5% | 11.03 | 4.2/km^{2} |
| Forresters Point | Designated place | Division No. 9, Subdivision C | 207 | 208 | −0.5% | 2.43 | 85.2/km^{2} |
| Fortune | Retired population centre | Fortune | 894 | 1,007 | −11.2% | 0.53 | 1,686.8/km^{2} |
| Fortune Harbour | Designated place | Division No. 8, Subdivision E | 55 | 78 | −29.5% | 10.69 | 5.1/km^{2} |
| Fox Island River-Point au Mal | Designated place | Division No. 4, Subdivision D | 149 | 173 | −13.9% | 17.69 | 8.4/km^{2} |
| Fox Roost-Margaree | Designated place | Division No. 3, Subdivision H | 267 | 327 | −18.3% | 17.57 | 15.2/km^{2} |
| François | Designated place | Division No. 3, Subdivision E | 64 | 89 | −28.1% | 4.8 | 13.3/km^{2} |
| Frederickton | Designated place | Division No. 8, Subdivision L | 126 | 221 | −43.0% | 1.58 | 79.7/km^{2} |
| Freshwater, Conception Bay | Designated place | Division No. 1, Subdivision H | 145 | 228 | −36.4% | 6.72 | 21.6/km^{2} |
| Gambo | Retired population centre | Gambo | 1,543 | 1,694 | −8.9% | 9.88 | 156.2/km^{2} |
| Gander Bay North | Designated place | Division No. 8, Subdivision L | 728 | 853 | −14.7% | 38.15 | 19.1/km^{2} |
| Gander Bay South | Designated place | Division No. 8, Subdivision L | 316 | 450 | −29.8% | 6.93 | 45.6/km^{2} |
| Garden Cove | Designated place | Division No. 2, Subdivision K | 32 | 71 | −54.9% | 5.13 | 6.2/km^{2} |
| George's Brook | Designated place | Division No. 7, Subdivision K | 344 | 358 | −3.9% | 4.53 | 75.9/km^{2} |
| Georgetown | Designated place | Division No. 1, Subdivision N | 351 | 372 | −5.6% | 8.42 | 41.7/km^{2} |
| Glovers Harbour | Designated place | Division No. 8, Subdivision E | 55 | 92 | −40.2% | 8.42 | 6.5/km^{2} |
| Goobies | Designated place | Division No. 1, Subdivision A, Division No. 2, Subdivision K, and Division No. 7, Subdivision M | 132 | 142 | −7.0% | 11.64 | 11.3/km^{2} |
| Goulds | Retired population centre | St. John's | 4,441 | 4,418 | +0.5% | 5.97 | 743.9/km^{2} |
| Grand Beach | Designated place | Division No. 2, Subdivision H | 71 | 65 | +9.2% | 5.33 | 13.3/km^{2} |
| Grand Bruit | Designated place | Division No. 3, Subdivision I | 0 | 0 | NA | 1.76 | 0.0/km^{2} |
| Grates Cove | Designated place | Division No. 1, Subdivision G | 180 | 127 | +41.7% | 3.24 | 55.6/km^{2} |
| Great Brehat | Designated place | Division No. 9, Subdivision D | 78 | 88 | −11.4% | 0.84 | 92.9/km^{2} |
| Great Codroy | Designated place | Division No. 4, Subdivision A | 107 | 79 | +35.4% | 4.96 | 21.6/km^{2} |
| Green Island Brook | Designated place | Division No. 9, Subdivision C | 132 | 143 | −7.7% | 2.56 | 51.6/km^{2} |
| Green's Harbour | Designated place | Division No. 1, Subdivision E | 530 | 642 | −17.4% | 6.26 | 84.7/km^{2} |
| Grey River | Designated place | Division No. 3, Subdivision F | 95 | 104 | −8.7% | 2.43 | 39.1/km^{2} |
| Harbour Mille-Little Harbour East | Designated place | Division No. 2, Subdivision I | 100 | 126 | −20.6% | 3.39 | 29.5/km^{2} |
| Harbour Round | Designated place | Division No. 8, Subdivision A | 185 | 188 | −1.6% | 1.83 | 101.1/km^{2} |
| Harry's Harbour | Designated place | Division No. 8, Subdivision P | 57 | 78 | −26.9% | 3.33 | 17.1/km^{2} |
| Herring Neck | Designated place | Division No. 8, Subdivision H | 56 | 103 | −45.6% | 0.94 | 59.6/km^{2} |
| Hickman's Harbour-Robinson Bight | Designated place | Division No. 7, Subdivision L | 352 | 379 | −7.1% | 20.81 | 16.9/km^{2} |
| Hodges Cove | Designated place | Division No. 7, Subdivision M | 225 | 261 | −13.8% | 5.89 | 38.2/km^{2} |
| Hopeall | Designated place | Division No. 1, Subdivision E | 205 | 242 | −15.3% | 5.61 | 36.5/km^{2} |
| Horwood | Designated place | Division No. 8, Subdivision L | 123 | 260 | −52.7% | 8.83 | 13.9/km^{2} |
| Humber Arm South | Retired population centre | Humber Arm South | 808 | 1,168 | −30.8% | 2.37 | 340.9/km^{2} |
| Humber Village | Designated place | Division No. 5, Subdivision F | 149 | 189 | −21.2% | 4.31 | 34.6/km^{2} |
| Indian Cove | Designated place | Division No. 8, Subdivision H | 65 | 60 | +8.3% | 1.91 | 34.0/km^{2} |
| Island Harbour | Designated place | Fogo Island | 142 | 123 | +15.4% | 3.51 | 40.5/km^{2} |
| Jackson's Cove-Langdon's Cove-Silverdale | Designated place | Division No. 8, Subdivision P | 123 | 129 | −4.7% | 14.73 | 8.4/km^{2} |
| Jean de Baie | Designated place | Division No. 2, Subdivision C | 145 | 171 | −15.2% | 1.97 | 73.6/km^{2} |
| Knights Cove - Stock Cove | Designated place | Division No. 7, Subdivision G | 53 | 51 | +3.9% | 4.13 | 12.8/km^{2} |
| La Poile | Designated place | Division No. 3, Subdivision I | 61 | 87 | −29.9% | 0.66 | 92.4/km^{2} |
| Ladle Cove | Designated place | Division No. 8, Subdivision L | 81 | 112 | −27.7% | 15.96 | 5.1/km^{2} |
| Lance Cove, Bell Island | Designated place | Division No. 1, Subdivision R | 264 | 322 | −18.0% | 14.63 | 18.0/km^{2} |
| L'Anse aux Meadows to Quirpon | Designated place | Division No. 9, Subdivision D | 180 | 224 | −19.6% | 9.45 | 19.0/km^{2} |
| Laurenceton | Designated place | Division No. 8, Subdivision F | 180 | 183 | −1.6% | 12.02 | 15.0/km^{2} |
| Little Harbour (East), Placentia Bay | Designated place | Division No. 1, Subdivision A | 76 | 91 | −16.5% | 1.82 | 41.8/km^{2} |
| Little Rapids | Designated place | Division No. 5, Subdivision F | 183 | 225 | −18.7% | 6.42 | 28.5/km^{2} |
| Little St. Lawrence | Designated place | Division No. 2, Subdivision F | 94 | 117 | −19.7% | 4.59 | 20.5/km^{2} |
| Lodge Bay | Designated place | Division No. 10, Subdivision B | 61 | 65 | −6.2% | 5.32 | 11.5/km^{2} |
| Loon Bay | Designated place | Division No. 8, Subdivision G | 140 | 177 | −20.9% | 12.43 | 11.3/km^{2} |
| Lower Lance Cove | Designated place | Division No. 7, Subdivision L | 80 | 85 | −5.9% | 0.87 | 92.0/km^{2} |
| MacDougalls | Designated place | Division No. 4, Subdivision A | 114 | 155 | −26.5% | 18.69 | 6.1/km^{2} |
| Main Point-Davidsville | Designated place | Division No. 8, Subdivision L | 660 | 302 | +118.5% | 28.75 | 23.0/km^{2} |
| Mainland | Designated place | Division No. 4, Subdivision E | 277 | 319 | −13.2% | 12.32 | 22.5/km^{2} |
| Makinsons | Designated place | Division No. 1, Subdivision M | 531 | 538 | −1.3% | 10.04 | 52.9/km^{2} |
| Markland | Designated place | Division No. 1, Subdivision X | 210 | 223 | −5.8% | 20.53 | 10.2/km^{2} |
| Marysvale part A | Designated place | Division No. 1, Subdivision O | 383 | 419 | −8.6% | 5.41 | 70.8/km^{2} |
| Mattis Point | Designated place | Division No. 4, Subdivision C | 90 | 132 | −31.8% | 6.51 | 13.8/km^{2} |
| McCallum | Designated place | Division No. 3, Subdivision D | 45 | 73 | −38.4% | 1.71 | 26.3/km^{2} |
| Merritt's Harbour | Designated place | Division No. 8, Subdivision H | 29 | 38 | −23.7% | 2.31 | 12.6/km^{2} |
| Michaels Harbour | Designated place | Division No. 8, Subdivision G | 53 | 63 | −15.9% | 2.56 | 20.7/km^{2} |
| Milton | Designated place | Division No. 7, Subdivision K | 375 | 410 | −8.5% | 3.07 | 122.1/km^{2} |
| Mobile | Designated place | Division No. 1, Subdivision U | 294 | 260 | +13.1% | 8.35 | 35.2/km^{2} |
| Moreton's Harbour | Designated place | Division No. 8, Subdivision H | 28 | 113 | −75.2% | 5.32 | 5.3/km^{2} |
| Musgrave Harbour | Designated place | Musgrave Harbour | 852 | 911 | −6.5% | 4.63 | 184.0/km^{2} |
| Nameless Cove | Designated place | Division No. 9, Subdivision C | 44 | 69 | −36.2% | 0.53 | 83.0/km^{2} |
| New Chelsea-New Melbourne-Brownsdale-Sibley's Cove-Lead Cove | Designated place | Division No. 1, Subdivision F | 491 | 494 | −0.6% | 14.25 | 34.5/km^{2} |
| New Harbour, Trinity Bay | Designated place | Division No. 1, Subdivision E | 923 | 767 | +20.3% | 14.28 | 64.6/km^{2} |
| Newman's Cove | Designated place | Division No. 7, Subdivision G | 111 | 150 | −26.0% | 3.55 | 31.3/km^{2} |
| Newville | Designated place | Division No. 8, Subdivision H | 79 | 115 | −31.3% | 2.07 | 38.2/km^{2} |
| Noggin Cove | Designated place | Division No. 8, Subdivision L | 180 | 258 | −30.2% | 2.39 | 75.3/km^{2} |
| Norman's Bay | Designated place | Division No. 10, Subdivision B | 15 | 25 | −40.0% | 6.48 | 2.3/km^{2} |
| Norris Arm North | Designated place | Division No. 6, Subdivision D | 192 | 202 | −5.0% | 11.33 | 16.9/km^{2} |
| North Harbour, Placentia Bay | Designated place | Division No. 2, Subdivision K | 160 | 185 | −13.5% | 2.56 | 62.5/km^{2} |
| North Harbour, St. Mary's Bay | Designated place | Division No. 1, Subdivision X | 62 | 69 | −10.1% | 8.4 | 7.4/km^{2} |
| O'Donnells | Designated place | Division No. 1, Subdivision W | 108 | 125 | −13.6% | 5.14 | 21.0/km^{2} |
| Old Shop | Designated place | Division No. 1, Subdivision Y | 264 | 284 | −7.0% | 4.07 | 64.9/km^{2} |
| Open Hall-Red Cliffe | Designated place | Division No. 7, Subdivision F | 54 | 60 | −10.0% | 4.21 | 12.8/km^{2} |
| O'Regan's Central | Designated place | Division No. 4, Subdivision A | 57 | 97 | −41.2% | 17.65 | 3.2/km^{2} |
| Patrick's Cove-Angels Cove | Designated place | Division No. 1, Subdivision C | 61 | 61 | 0.0% | 13.36 | 4.6/km^{2} |
| Pensons Arm | Designated place | Division No. 10, Subdivision B | 43 | 61 | −29.5% | 3.5 | 12.3/km^{2} |
| Petit Forte | Designated place | Division No. 2, Subdivision C | 26 | 57 | −54.4% | 5.49 | 4.7/km^{2} |
| Petley | Designated place | Division No. 7, Subdivision L | 76 | 88 | −13.6% | 1.13 | 67.3/km^{2} |
| Phillips Head | Designated place | Division No. 8, Subdivision E | 112 | 156 | −28.2% | 4.47 | 25.1/km^{2} |
| Piccadilly Head | Designated place | Division No. 4, Subdivision E | 65 | 124 | −47.6% | 3.01 | 21.6/km^{2} |
| Piccadilly Slant-Abraham's Cove | Designated place | Division No. 4, Subdivision E | 242 | 372 | −34.9% | 16.08 | 15.0/km^{2} |
| Pidgeon Cove-St. Barbe | Designated place | Division No. 9, Subdivision C | 121 | 135 | −10.4% | 2.09 | 57.9/km^{2} |
| Pleasantview | Designated place | Division No. 8, Subdivision E | 42 | 43 | −2.3% | 4.45 | 9.4/km^{2} |
| Plum Point | Designated place | Division No. 9, Subdivision C | 90 | 112 | −19.6% | 2.15 | 41.9/km^{2} |
| Pollard's Point | Designated place | Division No. 5, Subdivision G | 292 | 306 | −4.6% | 16.87 | 17.3/km^{2} |
| Port Albert | Designated place | Division No. 8, Subdivision L | 33 | 66 | −50.0% | 3.15 | 10.5/km^{2} |
| Portland Creek | Designated place | Division No. 9, Subdivision H | 86 | 77 | +11.7% | 11.88 | 7.2/km^{2} |
| Purcell's Harbour | Designated place | Division No. 8, Subdivision I | 58 | 59 | −1.7% | 1.44 | 40.3/km^{2} |
| Pynns Brook | Designated place | Division No. 5, Subdivision F | 113 | 96 | +17.7% | 8.06 | 14.0/km^{2} |
| Random Island West | Designated place | Division No. 7, Subdivision L | 405 | 535 | −24.3% | 75.14 | 5.4/km^{2} |
| Random Sound West | Designated place | Division No. 7, Subdivision M | 702 | 827 | −15.1% | 43.5 | 16.1/km^{2} |
| Rattling Brook | Designated place | Division No. 8, Subdivision P | 92 | 90 | +2.2% | 7.04 | 13.1/km^{2} |
| Reefs Harbour-Shoal Cove West-New Ferolle | Designated place | Division No. 9, Subdivision C | 190 | 208 | −8.7% | 11.09 | 17.1/km^{2} |
| Roaches Line | Designated place | Division No. 1, Subdivision M | 271 | 291 | −6.9% | 27.01 | 10.0/km^{2} |
| Rock Harbour | Designated place | Division No. 2, Subdivision D | 57 | 54 | +5.6% | 6.86 | 8.3/km^{2} |
| Searston | Designated place | Division No. 4, Subdivision A | 112 | 128 | −12.5% | 14.08 | 8.0/km^{2} |
| Sheaves Cove | Designated place | Division No. 4, Subdivision E | 49 | 66 | −25.8% | 3.42 | 14.3/km^{2} |
| Sheppardville | Designated place | Division No. 8, Subdivision C | 80 | 85 | −5.9% | 18.63 | 4.3/km^{2} |
| Sheshatshiu | Designated place | Division No. 10, Subdivision C | 796 | 671 | +18.6% | 1.81 | 439.8/km^{2} |
| Ship Cove, Northern Peninsula | Designated place | Division No. 9, Subdivision D | 76 | 75 | +1.3% | 2.65 | 28.7/km^{2} |
| Ship Cove-Lower Cove-Jerry's Nose | Designated place | Division No. 4, Subdivision E | 283 | 382 | −25.9% | 17.88 | 15.8/km^{2} |
| Shoe Cove (Notre Dame Bay) | Designated place | Division No. 8, Subdivision O | 16 | 158 | −89.9% | 0.99 | 16.2/km^{2} |
| Smith's Harbour | Designated place | Division No. 8, Subdivision O | 187 | 131 | +42.7% | 2.44 | 76.6/km^{2} |
| Smith's Sound | Designated place | Division No. 7, Subdivision K | 305 | 366 | −16.7% | 26.46 | 11.5/km^{2} |
| Snook's Arm | Designated place | Division No. 8, Subdivision O | 5 | 10 | −50.0% | 0.82 | 6.1/km^{2} |
| Sop's Arm | Designated place | Division No. 5, Subdivision G | 112 | 157 | −28.7% | 7.42 | 15.1/km^{2} |
| South Dildo | Designated place | Division No. 1, Subdivision Y | 195 | 189 | +3.2% | 3.94 | 49.5/km^{2} |
| Southeast Bight | Designated place | Division No. 2, Subdivision C | 169 | 92 | +83.7% | 0.63 | 268.3/km^{2} |
| Spanish Room | Designated place | Division No. 2, Subdivision D | 105 | 131 | −19.8% | 6.19 | 17.0/km^{2} |
| Spillars Cove | Designated place | Division No. 7, Subdivision I | 80 | 71 | +12.7% | 2.17 | 36.9/km^{2} |
| St. Andrews | Designated place | Division No. 4, Subdivision A | 146 | 124 | +17.7% | 9.53 | 15.3/km^{2} |
| St. Anthony Bight | Designated place | Division No. 9, Subdivision D | 100 | 120 | −16.7% | 2.42 | 41.3/km^{2} |
| St. Joseph's Cove-St. Veronica's | Designated place | Division No. 3, Subdivision D | 85 | 117 | −27.4% | 25.99 | 3.3/km^{2} |
| St. Judes | Designated place | Division No. 5, Subdivision A | 185 | 214 | −13.6% | 13.67 | 13.5/km^{2} |
| St. Juliens | Designated place | Division No. 9, Subdivision F | 10 | 20 | −50.0% | 2.72 | 3.7/km^{2} |
| St. Patricks | Designated place | Division No. 8, Subdivision C | 47 | 55 | −14.5% | 3.73 | 12.6/km^{2} |
| St. Teresa | Designated place | Division No. 4, Subdivision C | 61 | 92 | −33.7% | 10.26 | 5.9/km^{2} |
| Stag Harbour | Designated place | Fogo Island | 98 | 165 | −40.6% | 8.46 | 11.6/km^{2} |
| Stanhope | Designated place | Division No. 8, Subdivision F | 183 | 280 | −34.6% | 4.71 | 38.9/km^{2} |
| Stoneville | Designated place | Division No. 8, Subdivision L | 274 | 298 | −8.1% | 7.96 | 34.4/km^{2} |
| Summerville-Princeton-Southern Bay | Designated place | Division No. 7, Subdivision F | 267 | 310 | −13.9% | 29.25 | 9.1/km^{2} |
| Swift Current | Designated place | Division No. 2, Subdivision K | 207 | 207 | 0.0% | 10.46 | 19.8/km^{2} |
| Thornlea | Designated place | Division No. 1, Subdivision A | 61 | 115 | −47.0% | 1.76 | 34.7/km^{2} |
| Three Rock Cove | Designated place | Division No. 4, Subdivision E | 121 | 183 | −33.9% | 8.99 | 13.5/km^{2} |
| Tizzard's Harbour | Designated place | Division No. 8, Subdivision H | 58 | 55 | +5.5% | 1.84 | 31.5/km^{2} |
| Tompkins | Designated place | Division No. 4, Subdivision A | 32 | 82 | −61.0% | 1.74 | 18.4/km^{2} |
| Tors Cove | Designated place | Division No. 1, Subdivision U | 377 | 459 | −17.9% | 9.11 | 41.4/km^{2} |
| Trinity East | Designated place | Division No. 7, Subdivision J | 79 | 70 | +12.9% | 2.11 | 37.4/km^{2} |
| Upper Amherst Cove | Designated place | Division No. 7, Subdivision G | 58 | 41 | +41.5% | 1.58 | 36.7/km^{2} |
| Upper Ferry | Designated place | Division No. 4, Subdivision A | 173 | 147 | +17.7% | 10.3 | 16.8/km^{2} |
| Upper Island Cove | Retired population centre | Upper Island Cove | 975 | 1,142 | −14.6% | 1.83 | 532.8/km^{2} |
| Valley Pond | Designated place | Division No. 8, Subdivision H | 42 | 91 | −53.8% | 2.58 | 16.3/km^{2} |
| Virgin Arm-Carter's Cove | Designated place | Division No. 8, Subdivision H | 442 | 615 | −28.1% | 15.2 | 29.1/km^{2} |
| West Bay | Designated place | Division No. 4, Subdivision E | 227 | 235 | −3.4% | 10.79 | 21.0/km^{2} |
| Wild Cove, White Bay | Designated place | Division No. 8, Subdivision A | 59 | 49 | +20.4% | 2.76 | 21.4/km^{2} |
| William's Harbour | Designated place | Division No. 10, Subdivision B | 0 | 15 | −100.0% | 1.2 | 0.0/km^{2} |
| Woodville | Designated place | Division No. 4, Subdivision A | 24 | 73 | −67.1% | 2.79 | 8.6/km^{2} |
| Total designated places | — | — | 44,012 | 48,935 | −10.1% | 1,792.82 | 24.5/km^{2} |
| Province of Newfoundland and Labrador | — | — | 510,550 | 519,716 | −1.8% | 358,170.37 | 1.4/km^{2} |

== See also ==
- List of census agglomerations in Atlantic Canada
- List of communities in Newfoundland and Labrador
- List of local service districts in Newfoundland and Labrador
- List of municipalities in Newfoundland and Labrador
- List of population centres in Newfoundland and Labrador
