= Island Harbour, Newfoundland and Labrador =

Human settlement in Canada

Coordinates: 49°37′N 54°19′W

Island Harbour is a designated place in the Canadian province of Newfoundland and Labrador.

== History ==
Island Harbour was founded in 1864.

== Geography ==
Island Harbour is on Fogo Island in the Town of Fogo Island within Division No. 8.

== Demographics ==
As a designated place in the 2016 Census of Population conducted by Statistics Canada, Island Harbour recorded a population of 123 living in 59 of its 81 total private dwellings, a change of -23.1% from its 2011 population of 160. With a land area of 3.54 km^{2} (1.37 sq mi), it had a population density of 34.7/km^{2} (90.0/sq mi) in 2016.

== See also ==
- List of communities in Newfoundland and Labrador
- List of designated places in Newfoundland and Labrador
