= Herring Neck =

- Local service district / designated place
- Location of Herring Neck Herring Neck (Canada)
- Coordinates: 49°38′03.19″N 54°37′24.28″W
- County: Canada
- Province: Newfoundland and Labrador
- Settled: 1760s

Area (2016)
  - Land: 0.15 km^{2} (0.058 sq mi)

Population (2016)
  - Total: 20
  - Density: 131.2/km^{2} (340/sq mi)
- Time zone: UTC−03:30 (NST)
  - Summer (DST): UTC−02:30 (NDT)
- Postal code: A0G 2R0
- Area code: 709
- Website: https://herring-neck.wixsite.com/herring-neck

Herring Neck is a local service district and designated place in the Canadian province of Newfoundland and Labrador. It is on the northeastern extremity of New World Island, Notre Dame Bay. The community encompasses several small contiguous communities such as Merritt's Harbour, Hatchet Harbour, Salt Harbour, and Sunnyside.

It is believed the first European settlers in the area arrived in the 1760s. It first appeared in the Census of 1845 with a population of 546, which included the surrounding settlements as noted above. By 1857 the population had reached 610 and peaked near 1000 in the 1880s. It remained around that figure until the 1930s, from where it has steadily declined to 607 in the 1981 census and to only 20 in 2016. The population has continued to decline due to the cod moratorium and the downsizing of the fish processing plant in the community. Many have left the community to seek employment in larger communities.

In November 1908 at the Orange Hall, William Coaker gathered together a group of fisherman to form what became later the Fishermen's Protective Union, which became a powerful, though short-lived political entity within the House of Assembly of the Dominion of Newfoundland.

Herring Neck held a Come Home Year in the summer of 2014 and continues to hold an annual festival by the name of the "Herring Neck Dory Festival" on the second last weekend of July.

== Geography ==
Herring Neck is in Newfoundland within Subdivision H of Division No. 8.

== Demographics ==
As a designated place in the 2016 Census of Population conducted by Statistics Canada, Herring Neck recorded a population of 20 living in 9 of its 13 total private dwellings, a change of −9.1% from its 2011 population of 22. With a land area of 0.15 km^{2} (0.058 sq mi), it had a population density of 133.3/km^{2} (345.3/sq mi) in 2016.

== Government ==
Herring Neck is a local service district (LSD) that is governed by a committee responsible for the provision of certain services to the community. The chair of the LSD committee is James King.

== See also ==
- List of communities in Newfoundland and Labrador
- List of designated places in Newfoundland and Labrador
- List of local service districts in Newfoundland and Labrador
