= St. Juliens, Newfoundland and Labrador =

St. Juliens
- Designated place
- Location of St. Juliens St. Juliens (Canada)
- Coordinates: 51.095°N 55.751°W
- Country: Canada
- Province: Newfoundland and Labrador
- Region: Newfoundland
- Census division: 9
- Census subdivision: F

Government
  - Type: Unincorporated

Area
  - Land: 2.6 km^{2} (1.0 sq mi)

Population (2016)
  - Total: 20
- Time zone: UTC−03:30 (NST)
  - Summer (DST): UTC−02:30 (NDT)
- Area code: 709

St. Juliens is a designated place in the Canadian province of Newfoundland and Labrador.

== Geography ==
St. Juliens is in Newfoundland within Subdivision F of Division No. 9.

== Demographics ==
As a designated place in the 2016 Census of Population conducted by Statistics Canada, St. Juliens recorded a population of 20 living in 9 of its 24 total private dwellings, a change of −25.9% from its 2011 population of 27. With a land area of 2.6 km^{2} (1.0 sq mi), it had a population density of 7.7/km^{2} (19.9/sq mi) in 2016.

== See also ==
- List of communities in Newfoundland and Labrador
- List of designated places in Newfoundland and Labrador
