= Champneys-English Harbour, Newfoundland and Labrador =

Champneys-English Harbour
- Designated place
- Location of Champneys-English Harbour Champneys-English Harbour (Canada)
- Coordinates: 48.375°N 53.263°W
- Country: Canada
- Province: Newfoundland and Labrador
- Region: Newfoundland
- Census division: 7
- Census subdivision: J

Government
  - Type: Unincorporated

Area
  - Land: 12.05 km^{2} (4.65 sq mi)

Population (2016)
  - Total: 149
- Time zone: UTC−03:30 (NST)
  - Summer (DST): UTC−02:30 (NDT)
- Area code: 709

Champneys-English Harbour is a designated place in the Canadian province of Newfoundland and Labrador.

== Geography ==
Champneys-English Harbour is in Newfoundland within Subdivision J of Division No. 7.

== Demographics ==
As a designated place in the 2016 Census of Population conducted by Statistics Canada, Champneys-English Harbour recorded a population of 149 living in 65 of its 163 total private dwellings, a change of −6.3% from its 2011 population of 159. With a land area of 12.05 km^{2} (4.65 sq mi), it had a population density of 12.4/km^{2} (32.0/sq mi) in 2016.

== See also ==
- List of communities in Newfoundland and Labrador
- List of designated places in Newfoundland and Labrador
