= Humber Village, Newfoundland and Labrador =

Humber Village
- Designated place
- Location of Humber Village Humber Village (Canada)
- Coordinates: 48.99°N 57.766°W
- Country: Canada
- Province: Newfoundland and Labrador
- Region: Newfoundland
- Census division: 5
- Census subdivision: F

Government
  - Type: Unincorporated

Area
  - Land: 4.37 km^{2} (1.69 sq mi)

Population (2016)
  - Total: 189
- Time zone: UTC−03:30 (NST)
  - Summer (DST): UTC−02:30 (NDT)
- Area code: 709

Humber Village is a designated place in the Canadian province of Newfoundland and Labrador.

== Geography ==
Humber Village is in Newfoundland within Subdivision F of Division No. 5.

== Demographics ==
As a designated place in the 2016 Census of Population conducted by Statistics Canada, Humber Village recorded a population of 189 living in 66 of its 78 total private dwellings, a change of 6.8% from its 2011 population of 177. With a land area of 4.37 km^{2} (1.69 sq mi), it had a population density of 43.2/km^{2} (112.0/sq mi) in 2016.

== See also ==
- List of communities in Newfoundland and Labrador
- List of designated places in Newfoundland and Labrador
