= Fairbanks-Hillgrade =

Local service district in Canada

Coordinates: 49.5686°N 54.7031°W

Fairbanks–Hillgrade is a local service district and designated place in the Canadian province of Newfoundland and Labrador. It is on New World Island.

== Geography ==
Fairbanks-Hillgrade is in Newfoundland within Subdivision H of Division No. 8. It consists of the unincorporated communities of Fairbanks, Tilt Cove, and Hillgrade. These communities are along Route 340.

== Demographics ==
As a designated place in the 2016 Census of Population conducted by Statistics Canada, Fairbanks-Hillgrade recorded a population of 253 living in 115 of its 138 total private dwellings, a change of -0.4% from its 2011 population of 254. With a land area of 9.27 km^{2} (3.58 sq mi), it had a population density of 27.3/km^{2} (70.7/sq mi) in 2016.

== Government ==
Fairbanks-Hillgrade is a local service district (LSD) that is governed by a committee responsible for the provision of certain services to the community. The chair of the LSD committee is Corey Adams.

== See also ==
- List of communities in Newfoundland and Labrador
- List of designated places in Newfoundland and Labrador
- List of local service districts in Newfoundland and Labrador
