= Bridgeport, Newfoundland and Labrador =

Human settlement in Canada

Coordinates: 49.552°N 54.875°W

Location of Bridgeport in Newfoundland and Labrador

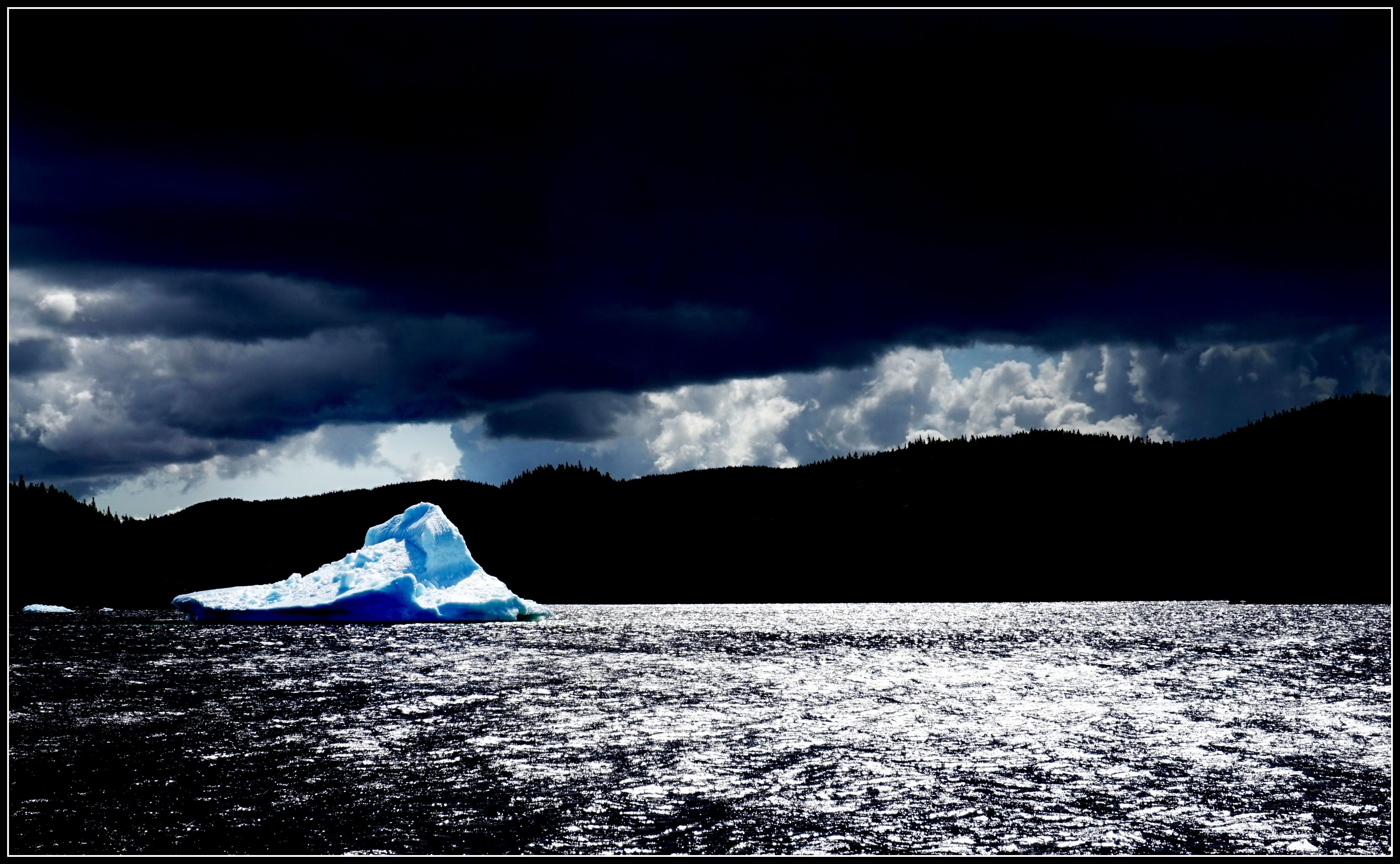
View of an iceberg from Bridgeport

Bridgeport is a local service district and designated place in the Canadian province of Newfoundland and Labrador. Services in Bridgeport include the local grocery store, a post office and a fish plant. Bridgeport also now features a newly updated community hall.

== Geography ==
Bridgeport is in Newfoundland within Subdivision H of Division No. 8. Bridgeport is on New World Island.

== Demographics ==
As a designated place in the 2016 Census of Population conducted by Statistics Canada, Bridgeport recorded a population of 104 living in 52 of its 72 total private dwellings, a change of -25.7% from its 2011 population of 140. With a land area of 3.11 km^{2} (1.20 sq mi), it had a population density of 33.4/km^{2} (86.6/sq mi) in 2016.

== Government ==
Bridgeport is a local service district (LSD) that is governed by a committee responsible for the provision of certain services to the community. The chair of the LSD committee is Sherman Jennings.

== See also ==
- List of communities in Newfoundland and Labrador
- List of designated places in Newfoundland and Labrador
- List of local service districts in Newfoundland and Labrador
