= Michael's Harbour =

- Location within Newfoundland Location within Newfoundland and Labrador Location within Canada
- Coordinates: 49°17′25″N 54°59′03″W
- Country: Canada
- Province: Newfoundland and Labrador

Population (2016)
  - Total: 63

Michael's Harbour is a designated place in the Canadian province of Newfoundland and Labrador. It is just outside Lewisporte. There are no stores or services and residents must commute to Lewisporte for essential services and Campbellton for education until the 9th grade. They commute to Lewisporte for high school. The community had a crisis in 2020 where a house burned down and it was determined that no fire department was obliged to provide services to the community. In February of the same year, the issue was resolved where the Lewisporte Fire Department agreed to provide service in exchange for CA$50 fee per homeowner.

== Geography ==
Michaels Harbour is in Newfoundland within Subdivision G of Division No. 8.

== Demographics ==
As a designated place in the 2016 Census of Population conducted by Statistics Canada, Michaels Harbour recorded a population of 63 living in 27 of its 34 total private dwellings, a change of −11.3% from its 2011 population of 71. With a land area of 2.42 km^{2} (0.93 sq mi), it had a population density of 26.0/km^{2} (67.4/sq mi) in 2016.

== See also ==
- List of communities in Newfoundland and Labrador
- List of designated places in Newfoundland and Labrador
