= Chanceport =

Local service district in Canada

Coordinates: 49.547°N 54.807°W

Location of Chanceport in Newfoundland and Labrador

Chanceport is a local service district and designated place in the Canadian province of Newfoundland and Labrador.

== Geography ==
Chanceport is in Newfoundland within Subdivision H of Division No. 8.

== Demographics ==
As a designated place in the 2016 Census of Population conducted by Statistics Canada, Chanceport recorded a population of 38 living in 15 of its 28 total private dwellings, a change of 2.7% from its 2011 population of 37. With a land area of 1.51 km^{2} (0.58 sq mi), it had a population density of 25.2/km^{2} (65.2/sq mi) in 2016.

== Government ==
Chanceport is a local service district (LSD) that is governed by a committee responsible for the provision of certain services to the community. The chair of the LSD committee is Leona Coles.

== See also ==
- List of communities in Newfoundland and Labrador
- List of designated places in Newfoundland and Labrador
- List of local service districts in Newfoundland and Labrador
