= Baytona =

Baytona Birchy Bay North
- Community
- Location of Baytona in Newfoundland
- Coordinates: 49°20′32″N 54°45′56″W
- Country: Canada
- Province: Newfoundland and Labrador

Government
  - Mayor: Jake Hynes
  - MHA: Derek Bennett
  - MP: Courtney Hynes

Area
  - Land: 15.38 km^{2} (5.94 sq mi)
- Elevation: 0 m (0 ft)

Population (2021)
  - Total: 251
  - Density: 17/km^{2} (44/sq mi)
- Time zone: UTC-3:30 (Newfoundland Time)
  - Summer (DST): UTC-2:30 (Newfoundland Daylight Time)
- Postal code: A0G-2J0
- Area code: 709
- Highways: Route 340

Baytona is a small rural community found in Newfoundland and Labrador. It is situated off Route 340, which runs from Lewisporte to Twillingate island, aptly named "Road to the Isles". A bay separates Baytona from a neighboring town called Birchy Bay. The first settlers of Baytona were fishermen, with women mainly staying home to raise children; however, with a depletion in cod stocks and lobsters, there was a shift away from the fishing industry.

Baytona has a fire department, town council and a recreation committee. There is currently one running convenience store. The community has a playground, and a basketball court.

The town also has an Anglican and a Pentecostal church.

== Demographics ==
Historical population
Year	Pop.	±%
2006	276	—
2011	264	−4.3%
2016	262	−0.8%
2021	251	−4.2%

In the 2021 Census of Population conducted by Statistics Canada, Baytona had a population of 251 living in 111 of its 162 total private dwellings, a change of −4.2% from its 2016 population of 262. With a land area of 15.15 km^{2} (5.85 sq mi), it had a population density of 16.6/km^{2} (42.9/sq mi) in 2021.

== Name change ==
Originally, Baytona was known as "Birchy Bay North". In 1958 the name was changed to "Gayside" to help the flow of mail delivery. The name was a play on the word "gay", which at that time meant happy, implying that Gayside was the more pleasant of the two communities. However, in 1985, due to a change in definition of the word "gay", and subsequent joking and harassment of neighbouring communities, the name of the town was, once again, changed from "Gayside" to "Baytona".
