= Loon Bay =

Human settlement in Canada

Coordinates: 49.274°N 54.832°W

Location of Loon Bay in Newfoundland and Labrador

Loon Bay is a local service district and designated place in the Canadian province of Newfoundland and Labrador.

== Geography ==
Loon Bay is in Newfoundland within Subdivision G of Division No. 8.

== Demographics ==
As a designated place in the 2016 Census of Population conducted by Statistics Canada, Loon Bay recorded a population of 177 living in 82 of its 153 total private dwellings, a change of 22.9% from its 2011 population of 144. With a land area of 11.9 km^{2} (4.6 sq mi), it had a population density of 14.9/km^{2} (38.5/sq mi) in 2016.

== Government ==
Loon Bay is a local service district (LSD) that is governed by a committee responsible for the provision of certain services to the community. The chair of the LSD committee is Alana Penney.

== See also ==
- List of communities in Newfoundland and Labrador
- List of designated places in Newfoundland and Labrador
- List of local service districts in Newfoundland and Labrador
