= Cottlesville =

- Town
- Interactive map of Cottlesville
- Coordinates: 49°29′43″N 54°51′16″W
- Country: Canada
- Province: Newfoundland and Labrador

Government

Population (2021)
  - Total: 246
- Time zone: UTC-3:30 (Newfoundland Time)
  - Summer (DST): UTC-2:30 (Newfoundland Daylight)
- Area code: 709
- Highways: Route 344

Cottlesville is a rural community just outside Summerford on New World Island, Newfoundland and Labrador.

== Demographics ==
In the 2021 Census of Population conducted by Statistics Canada, Cottlesville had a population of 244 living in 120 of its 145 total private dwellings, a change of −10% from its 2016 population of 271. With a land area of 11.15 km^{2} (4.31 sq mi), it had a population density of 21.9/km^{2} (56.7/sq mi) in 2021.
