= Valley Pond, Newfoundland and Labrador =

Valley Pond
- Local service district / designated place
- Location of Valley Pond Valley Pond (Canada)
- Coordinates: 49.574°N 54.895°W
- Country: Canada
- Province: Newfoundland and Labrador
- Region: Newfoundland
- Census division: 8
- Census subdivision: H

Government
  - Type: Unincorporated

Area
  - Land: 3.77 km^{2} (1.46 sq mi)

Population (2016)
  - Total: 101
- Time zone: UTC−03:30 (NST)
  - Summer (DST): UTC−02:30 (NDT)
- Area code: 709

Valley Pond is a local service district and designated place in the Canadian province of Newfoundland and Labrador.

== Geography ==
Valley Pond is in Newfoundland within Subdivision H of Division No. 8.

== Demographics ==
As a designated place in the 2016 Census of Population conducted by Statistics Canada, Valley Pond recorded a population of 101 living in 51 of its 71 total private dwellings, a change of −22.3% from its 2011 population of 130. With a land area of 3.77 km^{2} (1.46 sq mi), it had a population density of 26.8/km^{2} (69.4/sq mi) in 2016.

== Government ==
Valley Pond is a local service district (LSD) that is governed by a committee responsible for the provision of certain services to the community. The chair of the LSD committee is Doreen Jennings.

== See also ==
- List of communities in Newfoundland and Labrador
- List of designated places in Newfoundland and Labrador
- List of local service districts in Newfoundland and Labrador
