= Campbellton, Newfoundland and Labrador =

Campbellton
- Town
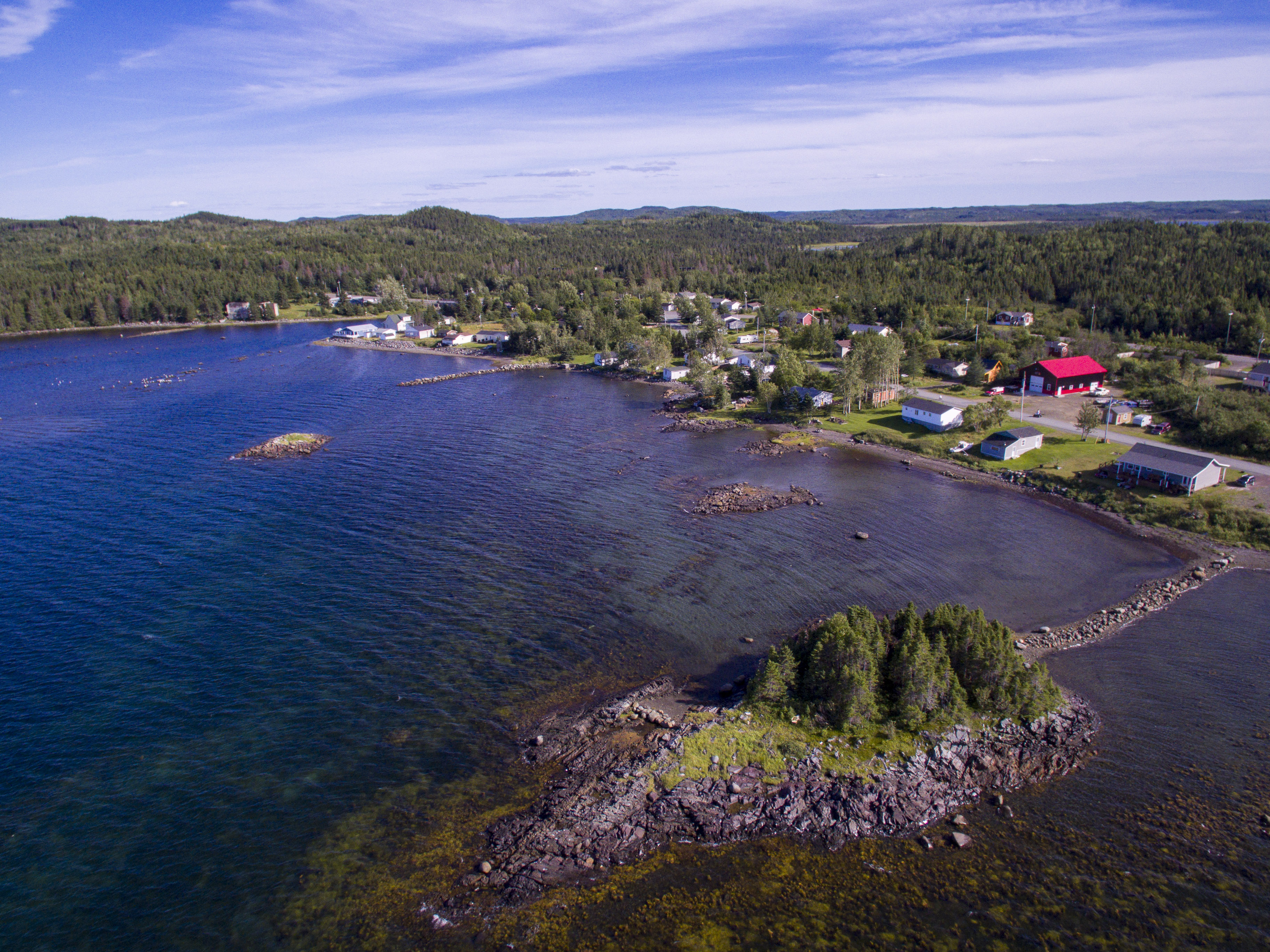
- Town of Campbellton

- Location of Campbellton in Newfoundland
- Coordinates: 49°17′12″N 54°56′10″W
- Country: Canada
- Province: Newfoundland and Labrador

Government
  - Mayor: Maisie Clark

Area
  - Land: 35.71 km^{2} (13.79 sq mi)

Population (2021)
  - Total: 459
  - Density: 12.7/km^{2} (33/sq mi)
- Time zone: UTC-3:30 (Newfoundland Time)
  - Summer (DST): UTC-2:30 (Newfoundland Daylight)
- Area code: 709
- Highways: Route 340; Route 343

Campbellton is a small lumbering and fishing community located on the island of Newfoundland at Indian Arm, Notre Dame Bay. The community was originally named Indian Arm due to a Beothuk village located on the nearby Indian Arm River. It was renamed to Campbellton in honor of the sawmill manager John Campbell.

== Demographics ==
In the 2021 Census of Population conducted by Statistics Canada, Campbellton had a population of 459 living in 215 of its 289 total private dwellings, a change of 1.5% from its 2016 population of 452. With a land area of 35.81 km^{2} (13.83 sq mi), it had a population density of 12.8/km^{2} (33.2/sq mi) in 2021.

== See also ==
- List of cities and towns in Newfoundland and Labrador
