= Salt Harbour =

Coordinates: 49°38′29″N 54°37′16″W

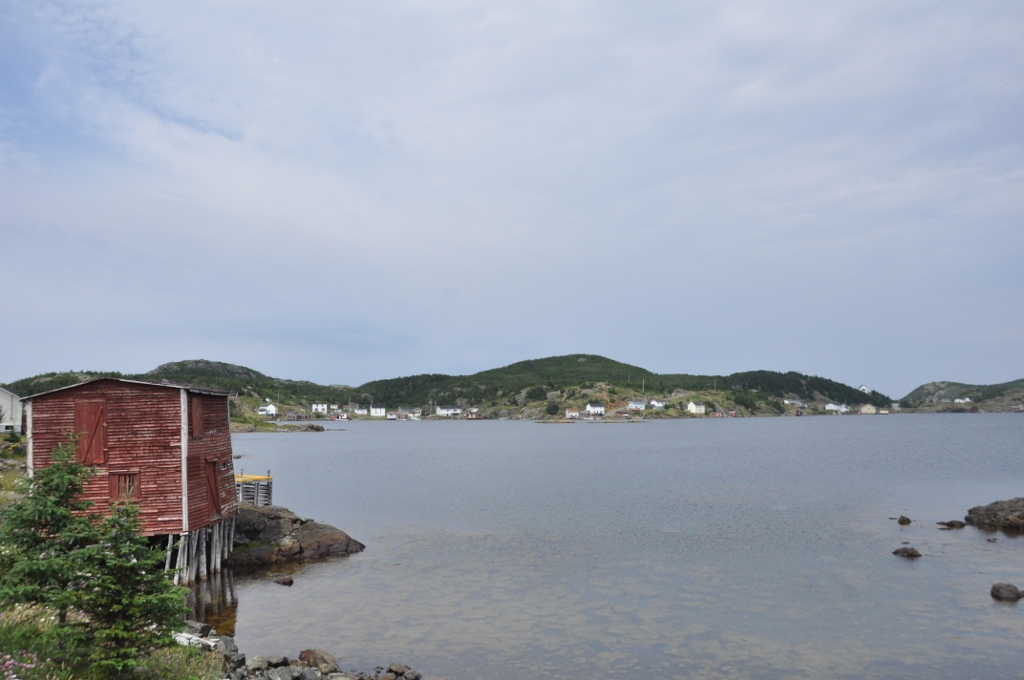

Salt Harbour is located in Herring Neck, New World Island, Newfoundland and Labrador. Salt Harbour is a one street town that has a church and a community centre.
