= Newville, Newfoundland and Labrador =

Local service district in Canada

Coordinates: 49.580°N 54.6773°W

Newville is a local service district and designated place in the Canadian province of Newfoundland and Labrador on New World Island. Route 340 in Newfoundland runs through the community.

== Geography ==
Newville is in Newfoundland within Subdivision H of Division No. 8.

== Demographics ==
As a designated place in the 2016 Census of Population conducted by Statistics Canada, Newville recorded a population of 110 living in 47 of its 54 total private dwellings, a change of -16% from its 2011 population of 131. With a land area of 1.79 km^{2} (0.69 sq mi), it had a population density of 61.5/km^{2} (159.2/sq mi) in 2016.

== Government ==
Newville is a local service district (LSD) that is governed by a committee responsible for the provision of certain services to the community. The chair of the LSD committee is Cindy Rice.

== See also ==
- List of communities in Newfoundland and Labrador
- List of designated places in Newfoundland and Labrador
- List of local service districts in Newfoundland and Labrador
