= Cobb's Arm, Newfoundland and Labrador =

Place in Newfoundland and Labrador, Canada

Coordinates: 49°37′03″N 54°34′23″W

Cobb's Arm is a local service district and designated place in the Canadian province of Newfoundland and Labrador on New World Island. It is located about 8 km outside Newville and leads to other communities such as Pikes Arm and Toogood Arm.

== Geography ==
Cobbs Arm is in Newfoundland within Subdivision H of Division No. 8.

== Demographics ==
As a designated place in the 2016 Census of Population conducted by Statistics Canada, Cobbs Arm recorded a population of 119 living in 60 of its 75 total private dwellings, a change of -11.9% from its 2011 population of 135. With a land area of 5.14 km^{2} (1.98 sq mi), it had a population density of 23.2/km^{2} (60.0/sq mi) in 2016.

== Government ==
Cobbs Arm is a local service district (LSD) that is governed by a committee responsible for the provision of certain services to the community. The chair of the LSD committee is Lisa Stuckey.

== See also ==
- List of communities in Newfoundland and Labrador
- List of designated places in Newfoundland and Labrador
- List of local service districts in Newfoundland and Labrador
