= Kettle Cove =

Human settlement in Newfoundland and Labrador, Canada

Coordinates: 49°36′2″N 54°43′6″W

Kettle Cove is a small community located on the southern island of Twillingate, Newfoundland and Labrador.
