= Dildo Run Provincial Park =

Provincial park in Newfoundland and Labrador, Canada

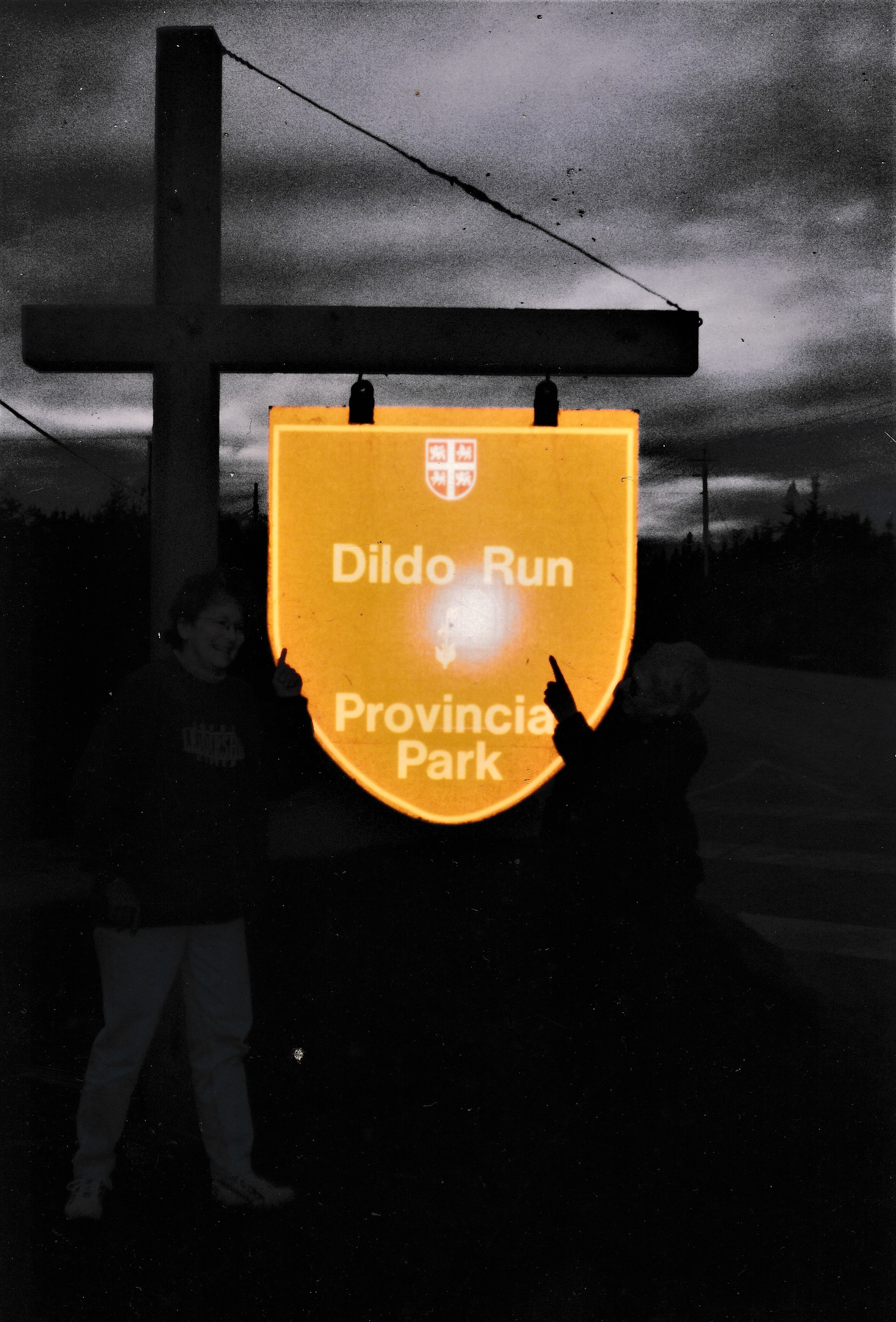
- Interactive map of Dildo Run Provincial Park
- Location: New World Island, Newfoundland and Labrador, Canada
- Nearest city: Twillingate
- Coordinates: 49°32′08″N 54°43′19″W
- Area: 327 ha (810 acres)
- Established: 1967

Dildo Run Provincial Park is a provincial park located on New World Island, Newfoundland and Labrador, Canada. It was opened to the public in 1967. The nearest major town is Twillingate. There are 55 campsites, each with a picnic table, fireplace, garbage can, and room for a vehicle. Fifteen picnic sites offer a view of the ocean. There is also a 1.3 km hiking trail through the forest.

== See also ==
- List of protected areas of Newfoundland and Labrador
- List of Canadian provincial parks
- List of National Parks of Canada
