= Black Duck Cove, Notre Dame Bay, Newfoundland and Labrador =

Coordinates: 49°35′50″N 54°42′19″W

Black Duck Cove is a community located south of Twillingate, Newfoundland and Labrador, Canada. Located on the southern island of Twillingate, few people reside in Black Duck Cove.
