= Moreton's Harbour =

Community in Newfoundland and Labrador

Coordinates: 49°34′04″N 54°51′54″W

Moreton's Harbour is a local service district and designated place in the Canadian province of Newfoundland and Labrador. It is on New World Island. The community is sometimes written as Morton's and occasionally as Moreton's. Clarence Wiseman, the tenth General of The Salvation Army from 1974 to 1977, was born at Moreton's Harbour.

== Geography ==
Moreton's Harbour is in Newfoundland within Subdivision H of Division No. 8.

== Demographics ==
As a designated place in the 2021 Census of Population conducted by Statistics Canada, Moreton's Harbour recorded a population of 111 down from 113 in 2016.

== Arts and culture ==
Moreton's Harbour is referenced in the chorus of the folk song, I's the B'y, with the lines "Fogo, Twillingate, Moreton's Harbour, all around the circle".

== Government ==
Moreton's Harbour is a local service district (LSD) that is governed by a committee responsible for the provision of certain services to the community. The chair of the LSD committee is Frazer Rideout.

== See also ==
- List of designated places in Newfoundland and Labrador
- List of local service districts in Newfoundland and Labrador
- Newfoundland outport
