= Birchy Bay =

- Town
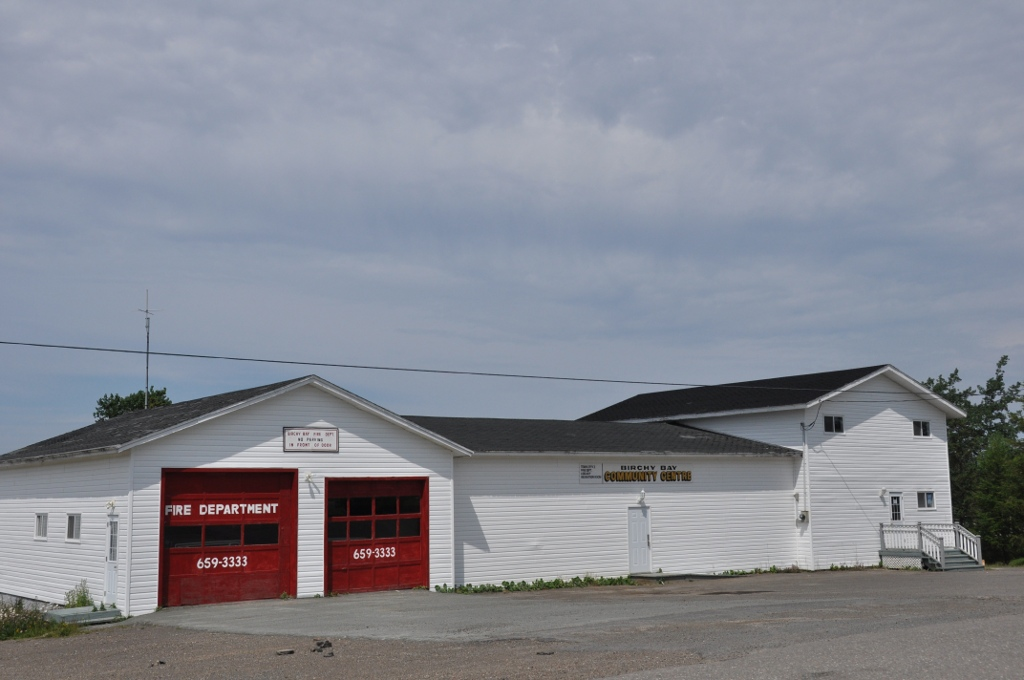

- Location of Birchy Bay in Newfoundland
- Coordinates: 49°21′40.11″N 54°43′38.22″W
- Country: Canada
- Province: Newfoundland and Labrador

Government
  - Mayor: Sterling Quinlan

Area
  - Land: 49.52 km^{2} (19.12 sq mi)

Population (2021)
  - Total: 511
- Time zone: UTC-3:30 (Newfoundland Time)
  - Summer (DST): UTC-2:30 (Newfoundland Daylight)
- Area code: 709
- Highways: Route 340

Birchy Bay is a small community found in Notre Dame Bay in the province of Newfoundland and Labrador, Canada.

== History ==
The name Birchy Bay is derived from the many birch trees which were found on its shores many years ago. Birchy Bay was first home to the native people of the Island which would have used the river which flows through the community as a source of fresh water and also to procure salmon and trout.

Tradition shows that there was a European fisherman shot at but not killed by a Beothuk man who used a decoy to lure the man within shot. The local lookout as known today was also recorded to have been used by the Beothuk and a large pine tree which grew at its summit was relieved of all its bark from the natives climbing to watch over the surrounding land.

The first recorded family to come and stay in Birchy Bay was Andrew Canning Sr. a man with unknown origins but came from Barr'd Islands to salmon fish. The family lived on the tilt and latter returned to Fogo Island when his sons died he returned to Barr'd Island. The grandson of Andrew Sr., John Canning returned to Birchy Bay with his wife in 1886 along came his adoptive sister Amelia Diamond Mews and James Mews. They began to farm in the community after the agriculture act of 1886. Soon after families such as the Quinlans, Osmond's and Popes came to settle in Birchy Bay. Birchy bays chief income was the logging industry in the early 1900s the French family of Summerford opened a steam-powered sawmill procuring lumber from the country and driving it down the streams and brooks. Also the lobster fishery along with trapping was another means of income in the early days.

== Demographics ==
In the 2021 Census of Population conducted by Statistics Canada, Birchy Bay had a population of 511 living in 226 of its 267 total private dwellings, a change of −7.1% from its 2016 population of 550. With a land area of 49.33 km^{2} (19.05 sq mi), it had a population density of 10.4/km^{2} (26.8/sq mi) in 2021.

== Services ==
While the town has a council and small volunteer fire department, consumers are limited to a seasonal museum on local history, a seasonal restaurant named Nick's, a small convenience store boasting a single fuel pump, and numerous churches. There has also been construction done at a popular swimming area called 'Deep Hole' to allow for easy family gatherings and summer activities.
