= Green Cove, Newfoundland and Labrador =

Settlement in Newfoundland and Labrador, Canada

Green Cove
- Interactive map of Green Cove
- Country: Canada
- Province: Newfoundland and Labrador
- Census division: Division No. 1
- Time zone: UTC−3:30 (NST)
  - Summer (DST): UTC−2:30 (NDT)
- Area code: 709

Green Cove is a settlement in the Canadian province of Newfoundland and Labrador. It is located on New World Island.
