= Virgin Arm-Carter's Cove =

Local service district in Canada

Coordinates: 49.53332°N 54.78333°W

Location of Virgin Arm-Carter's Cove in Newfoundland

Virgin Arm–Carter's Cove is a local service district and designated place on New World Island in the Canadian province of Newfoundland and Labrador. Virgin Arm-Carter's Cove is located approximately 90 km Northwest of Gander in Subdivision H of Division No. 8.

== History ==
The community of Virgin Arm is located at the head of Friday's Bay, on New World Island. Its name probably originated in the fact that the narrow arm was not settled until the 1870s, although it was used for winter woods work and schooner-building by fishermen from Tizzard's Harbour and Twillingate from the early 19th century.

The first record of settlement at Virgin Arm is from Lovell's Newfoundland Directory (1871), which identifies fisherman John Smith as a resident and notes a population of 10 people. However, Smith appeared in the subsequent records, while Virgin Arm was not enumerated separately in the Census until 1901 (pop. 70). Locally, the first settler is said to have been a Curtis, of Snellings Cove, Twillingate. William Curtis was resident by 1876, and by 1882 had been joined by John Hicks and a family named Nicholas, also of Twillingate. At about the turn of the 20th century several other families settled: Burt's (from Tizzard's Harbour), Gleason's, Hann's, Ings' and Price's.

As Virgin Arm was quite distant from the best headland fishing grounds, most fishermen were involved in the fisheries on the Labrador and French Shore. The most lucrative small-boat fisheries in the area were for bait fishes and lobster, in both Friday's Bay and Dildo Run. New World Island is only one kilometre wide at the bottom of Virgin Arm and early in the 20th century there was a tramway built between the two bodies of water for the transportation of fishing boats and lumber.

Virgin Arm had a strong tradition of woods work and, after the decline of the schooner fisheries in the 1920s and 1930s, many people found employment in pulpwood cutting or in supplying local sawmills. The population had grown to 225 by 1945.

== Recent History ==
In the mid-1960s the completion of a network of roads and causeways connecting the various communities of New World Island with each other and with the mainland saw Virgin Arm South emerging as a service center of the area with such facilities as the New World Island Medical Clinic and a regional high school, Coaker Academy. In addition, several businesses serving New World Island have been located along the Road to the Isles leading towards Summerford.

== Demographics ==
As a designated place in the 2021 Census of Population conducted by Statistics Canada, Virgin Arm-Carter's Cove recorded a population of 567 living in 189 of its 224 total private dwellings, a change of -7.7% from its 2016 population of 615. With a land area of 15.24 km^{2} (5.88 sq mi), it had a population density of 40.4/km^{2} (104.5/sq mi) in 2016.

== Government ==
Virgin Arm-Carter's Cove is a local service district (LSD) that is governed by a committee responsible for the provision of certain services to the community. The chair of the LSD committee is Trena Burge.

== See also ==
- List of designated places in Newfoundland and Labrador
- List of local service districts in Newfoundland and Labrador
- New World Island
