= Pikes Arm =

Fishing community in Canada

Coordinates: 49.6433°N 54.5832°W

Pikes Arm (alternatively "Pike's Arm") is a fishing community located on New World Island in Newfoundland and Labrador, Canada. It is a few minutes outside Cobb's Arm and about 15 minutes from Twillingate.

== See also ==
- List of communities in Newfoundland and Labrador
