= Summerford, Newfoundland and Labrador =

Summerford
- Town
- A view of the landscape

- Location of Summerford Summerford (Canada)
- Coordinates: 49°29′27″N 54°48′43″W
- Country: Canada
- Province: Newfoundland and Labrador
- Established: circa 1890

Government
  - Mayor: Kevin Barnes

Area
  - Total: 16.6 km^{2} (6.4 sq mi)
- Elevation: 10 m (33 ft)

Population (2021)
  - Total: 805
  - Density: 56.4/km^{2} (146/sq mi)
- Time zone: UTC−03:30 (NST)
- Highways: Route 340

Summerford is a small town on the central coast of Newfoundland in Canada. It is located just off Route 340, along Route 344. The Town of Summerford (formerly the Farmer’s Arm circa 1906) lies mostly on New World Island in Notre Dame Bay just off the coast of the island of Newfoundland. Strong's Island, which is connected to New World Island by Island Drive, is also a part of the town. Summerford had a population of 805 in 2021, down from 906 in the Canada 2016 Census. It is close to the neighbouring communities of Virgin Arm-Carter's Cove and Cottlesville.

== History ==
At Summerford’s advent, it was a town focusing on the industries of fishing and logging. It was a relatively prosperous town within rural, coastal Newfoundland. It contained three churches, which were filled every Sunday, for religion was paramount in this community. Farming was also a staple, as most grew their own food and raised their own animals for meat.

During the global conflicts of World War I and World War II, almost any man capable left the town to aid the British side, as at this point, Newfoundland was still a colony of Britain.

In the early 1970s, the Town Hall was established, which also serves as a community hall, fire station, and holds the library. The residents fought against having a town hall built for many years, knowing it would mean more taxes, but in the end, it was established anyway. The local government consists of a mayor, deputy mayor and 6 to 8 councilors.

Summerford required a doctor, so a clinic/house was built for one, in the early 1960s. A full clinic was built later, in the late 1960s, because of population increases. The New World Island Clinic serves all of NWI, and is an extension of the Twillingate Hospital.

Summerford residents generally attend New World Island Academy, a K-12 school, located along Route 340.

== Demographics ==
In the 2021 Census of Population conducted by Statistics Canada, Summerford had a population of 805 living in 368 of its 432 total private dwellings, a change of −11.1% from its 2016 population of 906. With a land area of 16.04 km^{2} (6.19 sq mi), it had a population density of 50.2/km^{2} (130.0/sq mi) in 2021.

== Economy ==
Summerford’s economy consisted of a mainly barter system for many years, and still implements it occasionally.

Historically there have been multiple regional schools, both elementary and high. In 2003 the, New World Island Academy was opened. It is a K-12 school, and its students are from all over the island.

Tourists supply local artists and crafts people, as well as tour guides, etc. with income during the summer months.
