= Notre Dame Bay =

Bay on the island of Newfoundland

Coordinates: 49°45′00″N 54°59′57″W

Location of Notre Dame Bay in Newfoundland

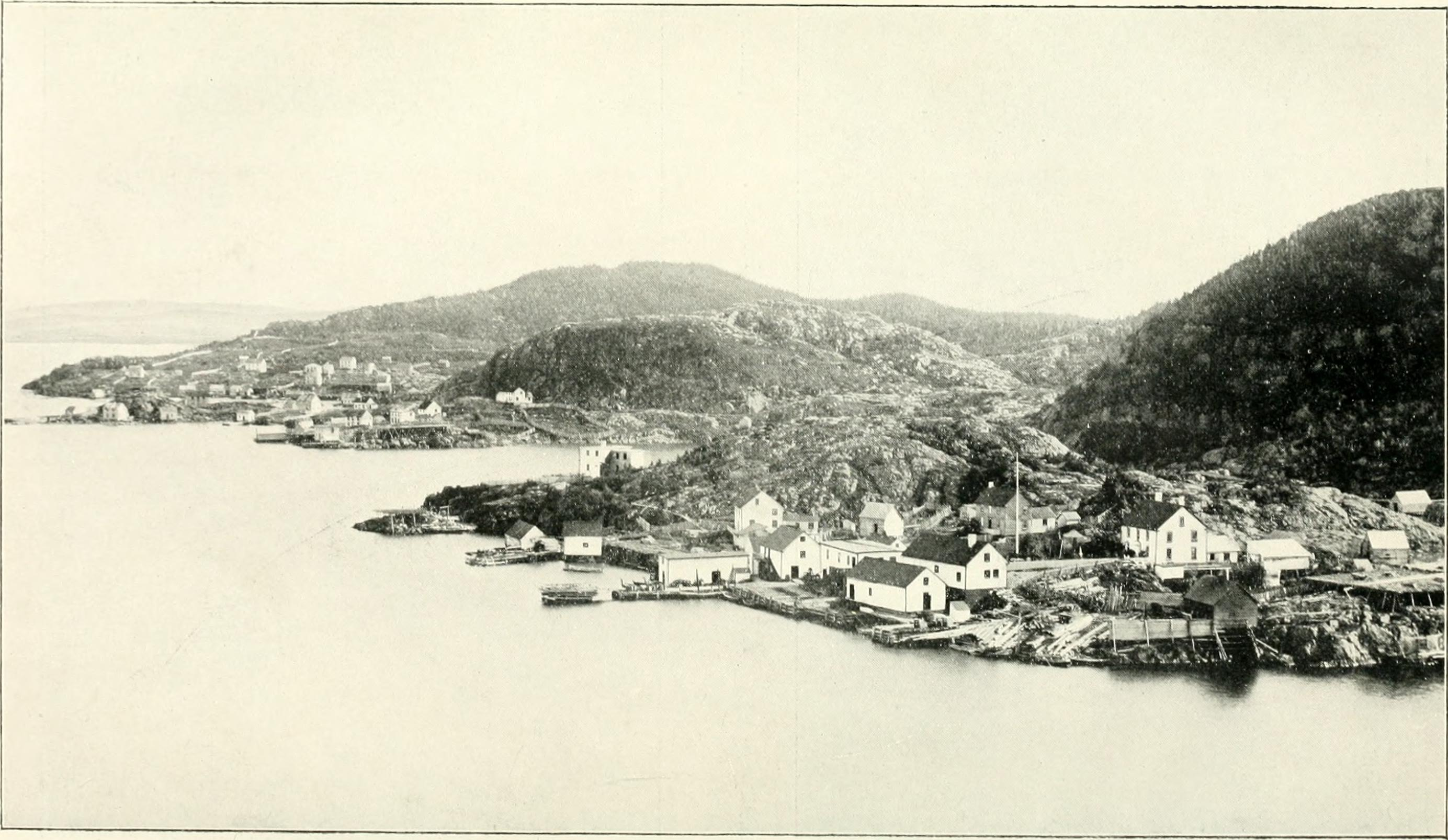
Notre Dame Bay in 1911

Notre Dame Bay is a large bay in Newfoundland, Canada. To the south it adjoins the Bay of Exploits.

The name, French for Our Lady Bay, dates to at least 1550, and is possibly a French translation of an earlier Portuguese name.

Trump Islands are located within Notre Dame Bay.
