= New World Island =

Island in Norte Dame Bay, Newfoundland

Coordinates: 49.58306°N 54.63720°W

Location of New World Island in Newfoundland

New World Island is an island in Notre Dame Bay, just off the coast of Newfoundland in the Canadian province of Newfoundland and Labrador.

The island is connected to Newfoundland by a causeway. The prominent communities on the island are Summerford, Virgin Arm-Carter's Cove, Fairbanks-Hillgrade, Moreton's Harbour, Newville, Cobb's Arm and Herring Neck. There are also several small fishing villages on the western end of the island, and some of its land is set aside as Dildo Run Provincial Park.

A prevailing theory holds that the island's name commemorates the 1523–24 expedition of Giovanni da Verrazzano that visited the coast of Newfoundland (among other places) and established the coast to be part of the New World rather than Asia.

== See also ==
- List of islands of Newfoundland and Labrador
