= Division No. 8, Newfoundland and Labrador =

Census division in Canada

Division No. 8
- Census division
- Interactive map of Division No. 8
- Coordinates: 48°25′12″N 53°52′48″W
- Country: Canada
- Province: Newfoundland and Labrador

Area
  - Total: 9,314.57 km^{2} (3,596.38 sq mi)
- As of 2016

Population (2016)
  - Total: 35,794
  - Density: 3.8428/km^{2} (9.9528/sq mi)

Division No. 8 is a census division on the north coast of the island of Newfoundland in the province of Newfoundland and Labrador, Canada. It has a land area of 9,314.57 km² (3,596.4 sq mi) and had a population of 33,940 at the 2016 census. Its largest communities are the towns of Lewisporte, Springdale, and Twillingate.

== Towns ==
- Baie Verte
- Baytona
- Beachside
- Birchy Bay
- Brent's Cove
- Brighton
- Burlington
- Campbellton
- Carmanville
- Change Islands
- Coachman's Cove
- Comfort Cove-Newstead
- Cottlesville
- Crow Head
- Embree
- Fleur de Lys
- Fogo Island
- King's Point
- LaScie
- Leading Tickles
- Lewisporte
- Little Bay
- Little Bay Islands
- Little Burnt Bay
- Lumsden
- Lushes Bight-Beaumont-Beaumont North
- Middle Arm
- Miles Cove
- Ming's Bight
- Musgrave Harbour
- Nipper's Harbour
- Pacquet
- Pilley's Island
- Point Leamington
- Point of Bay
- Port Anson
- Roberts Arm
- Seal Cove
- South Brook
- Springdale
- Summerford
- Tilt Cove
- Triton
- Twillingate
- Westport
- Woodstock

== Demographics ==
Historical populations Division No. 8, NL
Year	Pop.	±%
1951	36,799	—
1961	44,659	+21.4%
1971	50,690	+13.5%
1976	53,190	+4.9%
1981	54,542	+2.5%
1986	54,225	−0.6%
1991	51,882	−4.3%
1996	48,247	−7.0%
2001	42,188	−12.6%
2006	38,937	−7.7%
2011	37,121	−4.7%
2016	35,794	−3.6%
2021	33,940	−5.2%

In the 2021 Census of Population conducted by Statistics Canada, Division No. 8 had a population of 33,940 living in 15,385 of its 21,721 total private dwellings, a change of −5.2% from its 2016 population of 35,794. With a land area of 9,234.94 km^{2} (3,565.63 sq mi), it had a population density of 3.7/km^{2} (9.5/sq mi) in 2021.

== Unorganized subdivisions ==
- Subdivision A
- Subdivision C
- Subdivision D
- Subdivision E
- Subdivision F
- Subdivision G
- Subdivision H
- Subdivision I
- Subdivision L
- Subdivision M
- Subdivision O
- Subdivision P

== Sources ==
- "Division No. 8, Newfoundland and Labrador (Code 1008) Census Profile". 2011 census. Government of Canada - Statistics Canada.
