= List of local service districts in Newfoundland and Labrador =

The Canadian province of Newfoundland and Labrador has 175 unincorporated communities that are designated as local service districts (LSDs) for the purpose of providing water, sewer, fire, garbage, street lighting, animal control, and/or road maintenance services to ratepayers within a defined area. The services in an LSD are overseen by a committee of five to seven elected officials and delivered by hired staff. The costs are recovered by the LSD committee through taxes levied upon residents and other benefitting parties in the defined area.

The Local Service District Regulations of the province's Municipalities Act is the legislation that provides the authority to designate an LSD. Upon receiving a petition led by a permanent resident of a certain area that is signed by the majority of permanent residents of that area, the provincial minister responsible for the Municipalities Act may issue an order to incorporate an LSD for the area. The order assigns the official name of the LSD, defines its boundaries, and sets out a process to elect a committee to represent the defined area.

== List ==
List of local service districts in Newfoundland and Labrador
Name	Region	Census subdivision	Population (2016)	Population (2011)	Change	Land area (km^{2})	Population density
Aspen Cove	Central Newfoundland	Division No. 8, Subdivision L	178	220	−19.1%	3.06	58.2/km^{2}
Barachois Brook	Western Newfoundland	Division No. 4, Subdivision C	167	124	+34.7%	6.32	26.4/km^{2}
Bartletts Harbour	Western Newfoundland	Division No. 9, Subdivision C	129	130	−0.8%	7.07	18.2/km^{2}
Bay St. George South	Western Newfoundland	Division No. 4, Subdivision B	1,103	1,229	−10.3%	120.64	9.1/km^{2}
Beaches	Western Newfoundland	Division No. 5, Subdivision E	54	42	+28.6%	1.89	28.6/km^{2}
Bear Cove, Northern Peninsula	Western Newfoundland	Division No. 9, Subdivision C	91	115	−20.9%	5.48	16.6/km^{2}
Beau Bois	Eastern Newfoundland	Division No. 2, Subdivision D	41	55	−25.5%	1.05	39.0/km^{2}
Bellevue	Eastern Newfoundland	Division No. 1, Subdivision A	165	150	+10.0%	10.37	15.9/km^{2}
Bellevue Beach	Eastern Newfoundland	Division No. 1, Subdivision A	69	72	−4.2%	6.7	10.3/km^{2}
Benoits Siding	Western Newfoundland	Division No. 4, Subdivision A	32	5	+540.0%	6.23	5.1/km^{2}
Benton	Central Newfoundland	Division No. 6, Subdivision E	154	171	−9.9%	4.71	32.7/km^{2}
Birchy Cove	Eastern Newfoundland	Division No. 7, Subdivision G	20	30	−33.3%	4	5.0/km^{2}
Biscay Bay	Eastern Newfoundland	Division No. 1, Subdivision V	data not available from Statistics Canada				
Black Duck	Western Newfoundland	Division No. 4, Subdivisions C and D	110	99	+11.1%	19.75	5.6/km^{2}
Black Duck Brook and Winterhouse	Western Newfoundland	Division No. 4, Subdivision E	172	116	+48.3%	12.58	13.7/km^{2}
Black Duck Cove, Northern Peninsula	Western Newfoundland	Division No. 9, Subdivision C	155	179	−13.4%	1.4	110.7/km^{2}
Black Tickle-Domino	Labrador	Division No. 10, Subdivision B	150	168	−10.7%	9.43	15.9/km^{2}
Blaketown	Eastern Newfoundland	Division No. 1, Subdivision Y	605	511	+18.4%	19.94	30.3/km^{2}
Boyd's Cove	Central Newfoundland	Division No. 8, Subdivision G	183	190	−3.7%	6.46	28.3/km^{2}
Bridgeport	Central Newfoundland	Division No. 8, Subdivision H	104	140	−25.7%	3.11	33.4/km^{2}
Brig Bay	Western Newfoundland	Division No. 9, Subdivision C	117	117	0.0%	1.68	69.6/km^{2}
Brigus South	Eastern Newfoundland	Division No. 1, Subdivision U	83	86	−3.5%	6.36	13.1/km^{2}
Brown's Arm	Central Newfoundland	Division No. 8, Subdivision F	395	304	+29.9%	18.12	21.8/km^{2}
Buchans Junction	Central Newfoundland	Division No. 6, Subdivision A	72	79	−8.9%	8.07	8.9/km^{2}
Bunyan's Cove	Eastern Newfoundland	Division No. 7, Subdivision E	457	467	−2.1%	10.33	44.2/km^{2}
Burgoynes Cove	Eastern Newfoundland	Division No. 7, Subdivision K	126	128	−1.6%	12.17	10.4/km^{2}
Burnside-St. Chads	Central Newfoundland	Division No. 7, Subdivision D	95	91	+4.4%	15.94	6.0/km^{2}
Burnt Cove, St. Michael's, Bauline South	Eastern Newfoundland	Division No. 1, Subdivision U	316	308	+2.6%	8.64	36.6/km^{2}
Burnt Point-Gull Island-Northern Bay	Eastern Newfoundland	Division No. 1, Subdivision G	546	631	−13.5%	12.81	42.6/km^{2}
Calvert	Eastern Newfoundland	Division No. 1, Subdivision U	219	255	−14.1%	5.45	40.2/km^{2}
Campbells Creek	Western Newfoundland	Division No. 4, Subdivisions D and E	113	92	+22.8%	2.44	46.3/km^{2}
Canning's Cove	Eastern Newfoundland	Division No. 7, Subdivision E	231	264	−12.5%	4.25	54.4/km^{2}
Cape Freels North	Central Newfoundland	Division No. 7, Subdivision A	118	123	−4.1%	2.67	44.2/km^{2}
Cape Ray	Western Newfoundland	Division No. 3, Subdivision H	352	356	−1.1%	21.32	16.5/km^{2}
Caplin Cove-Southport	Eastern Newfoundland	Division No. 7, Subdivision M	687	786	−12.6%	26.46	26.0/km^{2}
Castor River North	Western Newfoundland	Division No. 9, Subdivision C	141	153	−7.8%	2.34	60.3/km^{2}
Castor River South	Western Newfoundland	Division No. 9, Subdivision C	136	141	−3.5%	6.81	20.0/km^{2}
Cavendish	Eastern Newfoundland	Division No. 1, Subdivision E	301	363	−17.1%	2.69	111.9/km^{2}
Chanceport	Central Newfoundland	Division No. 8, Subdivision H	38	37	+2.7%	1.51	25.2/km^{2}
Charlottetown, Bonavista Bay	Central Newfoundland	Division No. 7, Subdivision E	227	264	−14.0%	2.9	78.3/km^{2}
Cobbs Arm	Central Newfoundland	Division No. 8, Subdivision H	119	135	−11.9%	5.14	23.2/km^{2}
Cottrell's Cove	Central Newfoundland	Division No. 8, Subdivision E	123	144	−14.6%	37.18	3.3/km^{2}
Deadman's Bay	Central Newfoundland	Division No. 8, Subdivision M	130	155	−16.1%	12.57	10.3/km^{2}
Deep Bight	Eastern Newfoundland	Division No. 7, Subdivision M	186	176	+5.7%	15.35	12.1/km^{2}
Deer Park/Vineland Road	Eastern Newfoundland	Division No. 1, Subdivision W	data not available from Statistics Canada				
Diamond Cove	Western Newfoundland	Division No. 3, Subdivision J	46	51	−9.8%	2.42	19.0/km^{2}
Dildo	Eastern Newfoundland	Division No. 1, Subdivision E	1,234	1,198	+3.0%	8.12	152.0/km^{2}
Dunfield	Eastern Newfoundland	Division No. 7, Subdivision J	78	83	−6.0%	1.83	42.6/km^{2}
Eddies Cove West	Western Newfoundland	Division No. 9, Subdivision G	36	49	−26.5%	18.1	2.0/km^{2}
Epworth-Great Salmonier	Eastern Newfoundland	Division No. 2, Subdivision E	177	211	−16.1%	8.42	21.0/km^{2}
Fairbanks-Hillgrade	Central Newfoundland	Division No. 8, Subdivision H	253	254	−0.4%	9.27	27.3/km^{2}
Fairhaven	Eastern Newfoundland	Division No. 1, Subdivision A	85	85	0.0%	5.89	14.4/km^{2}
Flat Bay	Western Newfoundland	Division No. 4, Subdivision C	210	229	−8.3%	4.43	47.4/km^{2}
Forest Field-New Bridge	Eastern Newfoundland	Division No. 1, Subdivision W	52	70	−25.7%	10.95	4.7/km^{2}
Forresters Point	Western Newfoundland	Division No. 9, Subdivision C	208	204	+2.0%	3.12	66.7/km^{2}
Fox Island River-Point au Mal	Western Newfoundland	Division No. 4, Subdivision D	173	194	−10.8%	17.86	9.7/km^{2}
Fox Roost-Margaree	Western Newfoundland	Division No. 3, Subdivision H	327	334	−2.1%	17.69	18.5/km^{2}
François	Central Newfoundland	Division No. 3, Subdivision E	89	114	−21.9%	5.09	17.5/km^{2}
Freshwater, Conception Bay	Eastern Newfoundland	Division No. 1, Subdivision H	228	220	+3.6%	6.93	32.9/km^{2}
Gander Bay North	Central Newfoundland	Division No. 8, Subdivision L	853	849	+0.5%	37.84	22.5/km^{2}
Gander Bay South	Central Newfoundland	Division No. 8, Subdivision L	325	311	+4.5%	5.31	61.2/km^{2}
Garden Cove	Eastern Newfoundland	Division No. 2, Subdivision K	71	86	−17.4%	5.28	13.4/km^{2}
Georgetown	Eastern Newfoundland	Division No. 1, Subdivision N	229	169	+35.5%	3.32	69.0/km^{2}
Glovers Harbour	Central Newfoundland	Division No. 8, Subdivision E	92	78	+17.9%	8.85	10.4/km^{2}
Goobies	Eastern Newfoundland	Division No. 1, Subdivision A, Division No. 2, Subdivision K, and Division No. 7, Subdivision M	142	139	+2.2%	12.95	11.0/km^{2}
Grates Cove	Eastern Newfoundland	Division No. 1, Subdivision G	127	152	−16.4%	3.94	32.2/km^{2}
Great Brehat	Western Newfoundland	Division No. 9, Subdivision D	88	95	−7.4%	0.8	110.0/km^{2}
Great Codroy	Western Newfoundland	Division No. 4, Subdivision A	69	65	+6.2%	3.61	19.1/km^{2}
Green Island Brook	Western Newfoundland	Division No. 9, Subdivision C	143	161	−11.2%	2.87	49.8/km^{2}
Green's Harbour	Eastern Newfoundland	Division No. 1, Subdivision E	642	534	+20.2%	6.13	104.7/km^{2}
Grey River	Western Newfoundland	Division No. 3, Subdivision F	104	124	−16.1%	2.44	42.6/km^{2}
Harbour Mille-Little Harbour East	Eastern Newfoundland	Division No. 2, Subdivision I	126	136	−7.4%	3.56	35.4/km^{2}
Harry's Harbour	Central Newfoundland	Division No. 8, Subdivision P	73	69	+5.8%	2.47	29.6/km^{2}
Hay Cove	Western Newfoundland	Division No. 9, Subdivision D	data not available from Statistics Canada				
Herring Neck	Central Newfoundland	Division No. 8, Subdivision H	20	22	−9.1%	0.15	133.3/km^{2}
Hickman's Harbour-Robinson Bight	Eastern Newfoundland	Division No. 7, Subdivision L	379	402	−5.7%	20.73	18.3/km^{2}
Hodges Cove	Eastern Newfoundland	Division No. 7, Subdivision M	261	275	−5.1%	6.03	43.3/km^{2}
Hopeall	Eastern Newfoundland	Division No. 1, Subdivision E	242	349	−30.7%	5.58	43.4/km^{2}
Horwood	Central Newfoundland	Division No. 8, Subdivision L	260	235	+10.6%	8.8	29.5/km^{2}
Indian Cove	Central Newfoundland	Division No. 8, Subdivision H	65	65	0.0%	2.13	30.5/km^{2}
Jackson's Cove-Langdon's Cove-Silverdale	Central Newfoundland	Division No. 8, Subdivision P	129	150	−14.0%	15.08	8.6/km^{2}
Jean de Baie	Eastern Newfoundland	Division No. 2, Subdivision C	171	173	−1.2%	1.96	87.2/km^{2}
La Poile	Western Newfoundland	Division No. 3, Subdivision I	87	103	−15.5%	1.46	59.6/km^{2}
Lance Cove, Bell Island	Eastern Newfoundland	Division No. 1, Subdivision R	322	344	−6.4%	14.69	21.9/km^{2}
L'Anse aux Meadows to Quirpon	Western Newfoundland	Division No. 9, Subdivision D	224	282	−20.6%	9.59	23.4/km^{2}
Laurenceton	Central Newfoundland	Division No. 8, Subdivision F	183	178	+2.8%	11.64	15.7/km^{2}
Lethbridge to Sweet Bay	Eastern Newfoundland	Division No. 7, Subdivisions E and F	data not available from Statistics Canada				
Little Harbour (East), Placentia Bay	Eastern Newfoundland	Division No. 1, Subdivision A	91	111	−18.0%	1.81	50.3/km^{2}
Little Rapids	Western Newfoundland	Division No. 5, Subdivision F	225	233	−3.4%	5.83	38.6/km^{2}
Little St. Lawrence	Eastern Newfoundland	Division No. 2, Subdivision F	117	125	−6.4%	4.85	24.1/km^{2}
Lodge Bay	Labrador	Division No. 10, Subdivision B	65	78	−16.7%	6.19	10.5/km^{2}
Loon Bay	Central Newfoundland	Division No. 8, Subdivision G	177	144	+22.9%	11.9	14.9/km^{2}
Lower Lance Cove	Eastern Newfoundland	Division No. 7, Subdivision L	85	97	−12.4%	0.85	100.0/km^{2}
Main Point-Davidsville	Central Newfoundland	Division No. 8, Subdivision L	302	323	−6.5%	28.61	10.6/km^{2}
Mainland	Western Newfoundland	Division No. 4, Subdivision E	314	341	−7.9%	11.28	27.8/km^{2}
Makinsons	Eastern Newfoundland	Division No. 1, Subdivision M	436	438	−0.5%	22.49	19.4/km^{2}
Markland	Eastern Newfoundland	Division No. 1, Subdivision X	223	196	+13.8%	20.74	10.8/km^{2}
Marysvale	Eastern Newfoundland	Division No. 1, Subdivision O	562	619	−9.2%	10.43	53.9/km^{2}
Mattis Point	Western Newfoundland	Division No. 4, Subdivision C	132	129	+2.3%	6.49	20.3/km^{2}
McCallum	Central Newfoundland	Division No. 3, Subdivision D	73	92	−20.7%	1.82	40.1/km^{2}
Merritt's Harbour	Central Newfoundland	Division No. 8, Subdivision H	38	36	+5.6%	2.33	16.3/km^{2}
Mobile	Eastern Newfoundland	Division No. 1, Subdivision U	435	201	+116.4%	6.5	66.9/km^{2}
Moreton's Harbour	Central Newfoundland	Division No. 8, Subdivision H	103	136	−24.3%	4.09	25.2/km^{2}
Nameless Cove	Western Newfoundland	Division No. 9, Subdivision C	69	69	0.0%	0.64	107.8/km^{2}
New Chelsea-New Melbourne-Brownsdale-Sibley's Cove-Lead Cove	Eastern Newfoundland	Division No. 1, Subdivision F	494	503	−1.8%	14.6	33.8/km^{2}
New Harbour, Trinity Bay	Eastern Newfoundland	Division No. 1, Subdivision E	491	501	−2.0%	11.83	41.5/km^{2}
Newman's Cove	Eastern Newfoundland	Division No. 7, Subdivision G	150	156	−3.8%	3.55	42.3/km^{2}
Newville	Central Newfoundland	Division No. 8, Subdivision H	110	131	−16.0%	1.79	61.5/km^{2}
Noddy Bay	Western Newfoundland	Division No. 8, Subdivision P	data not available from Statistics Canada				
Noggin Cove	Central Newfoundland	Division No. 8, Subdivision L	258	262	−1.5%	2.31	111.7/km^{2}
Norman's Bay	Labrador	Division No. 10, Subdivision B	25	34	−26.5%	9	2.8/km^{2}
Norris Arm North	Central Newfoundland	Division No. 6, Subdivision D	202	188	+7.4%	11.72	17.2/km^{2}
North Harbour, St. Mary's Bay	Eastern Newfoundland	Division No. 1, Subdivision X	69	92	−25.0%	8.44	8.2/km^{2}
O'Donnells	Eastern Newfoundland	Division No. 1, Subdivision W	125	157	−20.4%	3.44	36.3/km^{2}
Old Shop	Eastern Newfoundland	Division No. 1, Subdivision Y	209	220	−5.0%	2.87	72.8/km^{2}
Open Hall-Red Cliffe	Eastern Newfoundland	Division No. 7, Subdivision F	60	90	−33.3%	4.19	14.3/km^{2}
O'Regan's Central	Western Newfoundland	Division No. 4, Subdivision A	107	107	0.0%	23.63	4.5/km^{2}
Patrick's Cove-Angels Cove	Eastern Newfoundland	Division No. 1, Subdivision C	56	58	−3.4%	11.63	4.8/km^{2}
Pensons Arm	Labrador	Division No. 10, Subdivision B	61	53	+15.1%	3.23	18.9/km^{2}
Petit Forte	Eastern Newfoundland	Division No. 2, Subdivision C	57	85	−32.9%	5.56	10.3/km^{2}
Petley	Eastern Newfoundland	Division No. 7, Subdivision L	88	80	+10.0%	1.18	74.6/km^{2}
Phillips Head	Central Newfoundland	Division No. 8, Subdivision E	151	162	−6.8%	3.58	42.2/km^{2}
Piccadilly Head	Western Newfoundland	Division No. 4, Subdivision E	124	139	−10.8%	2.99	41.5/km^{2}
Piccadilly Slant-Abraham's Cove	Western Newfoundland	Division No. 4, Subdivision E	372	380	−2.1%	16.45	22.6/km^{2}
Pidgeon Cove-St. Barbe	Western Newfoundland	Division No. 9, Subdivision C	135	138	−2.2%	2.13	63.4/km^{2}
Pleasantview	Central Newfoundland	Division No. 8, Subdivision E	43	49	−12.2%	4.8	9.0/km^{2}
Plum Point	Western Newfoundland	Division No. 9, Subdivision C	112	128	−12.5%	2.45	45.7/km^{2}
Pollard's Point	Western Newfoundland	Division No. 5, Subdivision G	306	252	+21.4%	16.85	18.2/km^{2}
Port Albert	Central Newfoundland	Division No. 8, Subdivision L	66	69	−4.3%	3.16	20.9/km^{2}
Portland Creek	Western Newfoundland	Division No. 9, Subdivision H	77	84	−8.3%	10.73	7.2/km^{2}
Purcell's Harbour	Central Newfoundland	Division No. 8, Subdivision I	59	49	+20.4%	1.43	41.3/km^{2}
Pynns Brook	Western Newfoundland	Division No. 5, Subdivision F	96	107	−10.3%	8.06	11.9/km^{2}
Quirpon	Western Newfoundland	Division No. 9, Subdivision D	data not available from Statistics Canada				
Random Island West	Eastern Newfoundland	Division No. 7, Subdivision L	535	530	+0.9%	75.59	7.1/km^{2}
Random Sound West (previously Hillview-Adeytown-Hatchet Cove-St. Jones Within)	Eastern Newfoundland	Division No. 7, Subdivision M	436	438	−0.5%	29.96	14.6/km^{2}
Rattling Brook	Central Newfoundland	Division No. 8, Subdivision P	90	101	−10.9%	6.98	12.9/km^{2}
Reefs Harbour-Shoal Cove West-New Ferolle	Western Newfoundland	Division No. 9, Subdivision C	100	230	−56.5%	11.94	8.4/km^{2}
Roaches Line	Eastern Newfoundland	Division No. 1, Subdivision M	276	279	−1.1%	26.57	10.4/km^{2}
Rock Harbour	Eastern Newfoundland	Division No. 2, Subdivision D	54	66	−18.2%	7.36	7.3/km^{2}
Searston	Western Newfoundland	Division No. 4, Subdivision A	128	120	+6.7%	13.94	9.2/km^{2}
Sheaves Cove	Western Newfoundland	Division No. 4, Subdivision E	66	117	−43.6%	3.15	21.0/km^{2}
Sheppardville	Central Newfoundland	Division No. 8, Subdivision C	85	77	+10.4%	18.52	4.6/km^{2}
Ship Cove, Northern Peninsula	Western Newfoundland	Division No. 9, Subdivision D	75	88	−14.8%	2.66	28.2/km^{2}
Ship Cove-Lower Cove-Jerry's Nose	Western Newfoundland	Division No. 4, Subdivision E	382	356	+7.3%	17.93	21.3/km^{2}
Shoe Cove (Notre Dame Bay)	Central Newfoundland	Division No. 8, Subdivision O	data not available from Statistics Canada				
Smith's Harbour	Eastern Newfoundland	Division No. 8, Subdivision O	131	146	−10.3%	2.41	54.4/km^{2}
Smith's Sound	Central Newfoundland	Division No. 7, Subdivision K	366	317	+15.5%	26.27	13.9/km^{2}
Sop's Arm	Western Newfoundland	Division No. 5, Subdivision G	157	197	−20.3%	7.42	21.2/km^{2}
South Dildo	Eastern Newfoundland	Division No. 1, Subdivision Y	249	314	−20.7%	4.93	50.5/km^{2}
Southeast Bight	Eastern Newfoundland	Division No. 2, Subdivision C	92	92	0.0%	0.81	113.6/km^{2}
Spanish Room	Eastern Newfoundland	Division No. 2, Subdivision D	131	134	−2.2%	5.63	23.3/km^{2}
Spillars Cove	Eastern Newfoundland	Division No. 7, Subdivision I	71	87	−18.4%	2.2	32.3/km^{2}
St. Andrews	Western Newfoundland	Division No. 4, Subdivision A	284	303	−6.3%	28.47	10.0/km^{2}
St. Anthony Bight	Western Newfoundland	Division No. 9, Subdivision D	120	128	−6.2%	2.33	51.5/km^{2}
St. Joseph's Cove-St. Veronica's	Central Newfoundland	Division No. 3, Subdivision D	117	135	−13.3%	25.71	4.6/km^{2}
St. Judes	Western Newfoundland	Division No. 5, Subdivision A	214	201	+6.5%	13.64	15.7/km^{2}
St. Patricks	Central Newfoundland	Division No. 8, Subdivision C	31	45	−31.1%	1.38	22.5/km^{2}
St. Teresa	Western Newfoundland	Division No. 4, Subdivision C	82	156	−47.4%	9.16	9.0/km^{2}
Stanhope	Central Newfoundland	Division No. 8, Subdivision F	280	268	+4.5%	4.53	61.8/km^{2}
Stoneville	Central Newfoundland	Division No. 8, Subdivision L	298	317	−6.0%	7.87	37.9/km^{2}
Straitsview	Western Newfoundland	Division No. 9, Subdivision D	data not available from Statistics Canada				
Summerville-Princeton-Southern Bay	Eastern Newfoundland	Division No. 7, Subdivision F	310	367	−15.5%	29.12	10.6/km^{2}
Swift Current	Eastern Newfoundland	Division No. 2, Subdivision K	207	208	−0.5%	10.62	19.5/km^{2}
Thornlea	Eastern Newfoundland	Division No. 1, Subdivision A	115	101	+13.9%	1.76	65.3/km^{2}
Three Rock Cove	Western Newfoundland	Division No. 4, Subdivision E	188	189	−0.5%	10.6	17.7/km^{2}
Tizzard's Harbour	Central Newfoundland	Division No. 8, Subdivision H	55	53	+3.8%	1.83	30.1/km^{2}
Tompkins	Western Newfoundland	Division No. 4, Subdivision A	114	135	−15.6%	6.25	18.2/km^{2}
Tors Cove	Eastern Newfoundland	Division No. 1, Subdivision U	300	449	−33.2%	9.17	32.7/km^{2}
Upper Amherst Cove	Eastern Newfoundland	Division No. 7, Subdivision G	41	36	+13.9%	1.59	25.8/km^{2}
Upper Ferry	Western Newfoundland	Division No. 4, Subdivision A	175	181	−3.3%	11.36	15.4/km^{2}
Valley Pond	Central Newfoundland	Division No. 8, Subdivision H	101	130	−22.3%	3.77	26.8/km^{2}
Virgin Arm-Carter's Cove	Central Newfoundland	Division No. 8, Subdivision H	615	622	−1.1%	15.24	40.4/km^{2}
West Bay	Western Newfoundland	Division No. 4, Subdivision E	235	273	−13.9%	10.58	22.2/km^{2}
Wild Cove, White Bay	Central Newfoundland	Division No. 8, Subdivision A	49	66	−25.8%	2.76	17.8/km^{2}
William's Harbour	Labrador	Division No. 10, Subdivision B	15	18	−16.7%	1.26	11.9/km^{2}

== See also ==
- List of designated places in Newfoundland and Labrador
- List of municipalities in Newfoundland and Labrador
- Local service board (Ontario)
- Local service district (New Brunswick)
