= L'Anse aux Meadows to Quirpon, Newfoundland and Labrador =

L'Anse aux Meadows to Quirpon
- Designated place
- Location of L'Anse aux Meadows to Quirpon L'Anse aux Meadows to Quirpon (Canada)
- Coordinates: 51.582°N 55.477°W
- Country: Canada
- Province: Newfoundland and Labrador
- Region: Newfoundland
- Census division: 9
- Census subdivision: D

Government
  - Type: Unincorporated

Area
  - Land: 9.59 km^{2} (3.70 sq mi)

Population (2016)
  - Total: 224
- Time zone: UTC−03:30 (NST)
  - Summer (DST): UTC−02:30 (NDT)
- Area code: 709

L'Anse aux Meadows to Quirpon is a designated place in the Canadian province of Newfoundland and Labrador.

== Geography ==
L'Anse aux Meadows to Quirpon is in Newfoundland within Subdivision D of Division No. 9. It consists of five communities: L'Anse aux Meadows, Hay Cove, Straitsview, Noddy Bay and Quirpon, all of which are separate local service districts.

== Demographics ==
As a designated place in the 2016 Census of Population conducted by Statistics Canada, L'Anse aux Meadows to Quirpon recorded a population of 224 living in 103 of its 132 total private dwellings, a change of −20.6% from its 2011 population of 282. With a land area of 9.59 km^{2} (3.70 sq mi), it had a population density of 23.4/km^{2} (60.5/sq mi) in 2016.

== See also ==
- List of communities in Newfoundland and Labrador
- List of designated places in Newfoundland and Labrador
