= Goobies =

- Local service district / designated place
- Location of Goobies Goobies (Canada)
- Coordinates: 47.939°N 53.981°W
- Country: Canada
- Province: Newfoundland and Labrador
- Region: Newfoundland
- Census division: 1, 2, and 7
- Census subdivision: A, K, and M

Government
  - Type: Unincorporated

Area
  - Land: 12.95 km^{2} (5.00 sq mi)

Population (2016)
  - Total: 142
- Time zone: UTC−03:30 (NST)
  - Summer (DST): UTC−02:30 (NDT)
- Area code: 709

Goobies is a local service district and designated place in the Canadian province of Newfoundland and Labrador.

== Geography ==
Goobies is in Newfoundland and straddles the boundary between three census subdivisions:

- Subdivision A of Division No. 1;
- Subdivision K of Division No. 2; and
- Subdivision M of Division No. 7.

== Demographics ==
As a designated place in the 2016 Census of Population conducted by Statistics Canada, Goobies recorded a population of 142 living in 70 of its 167 total private dwellings, a change of 2.2% from its 2011 population of 139. With a land area of 12.95 km^{2} (5.00 sq mi), it had a population density of 11.0/km^{2} (28.4/sq mi) in 2016.

== Government ==
Goobies is a local service district (LSD) that is governed by a committee responsible for the provision of certain services to the community. The chair of the LSD committee is Bill Goobie.

== See also ==
- List of communities in Newfoundland and Labrador
- List of designated places in Newfoundland and Labrador
- List of local service districts in Newfoundland and Labrador
