= Norris Arm North, Newfoundland and Labrador =

Norris Arm North Alderburn
- Local service district / designated place
- Location of Norris Arm North Norris Arm North (Canada)
- Coordinates: 49.118°N 55.244°W
- Country: Canada
- Province: Newfoundland and Labrador
- Region: Newfoundland
- Census division: 6
- Census subdivision: D

Government
  - Type: Unincorporated

Area
  - Land: 11.72 km^{2} (4.53 sq mi)

Population (2016)
  - Total: 202
- Time zone: UTC−03:30 (NST)
  - Summer (DST): UTC−02:30 (NDT)
- Area code: 709

Norris Arm North is a local service district and designated place in the Canadian province of Newfoundland and Labrador. The place is also known as Alderburn. It was originally a fishing and farming settlement.

== Geography ==
Norris Arm North is in Newfoundland within Subdivision D of Division No. 6. It is located near the Trans-Canada Highway just northeast of the town of Norris Arm.

== Demographics ==
As a designated place in the 2016 Census of Population conducted by Statistics Canada, Norris Arm North recorded a population of 202 living in 89 of its 116 total private dwellings, a change of 7.4% from its 2011 population of 188. With a land area of 11.72 km^{2} (4.53 sq mi), it had a population density of 17.2/km^{2} (44.6/sq mi) in 2016.

== Government ==
Norris Arm North is a local service district (LSD) that is governed by a committee responsible for the provision of certain services to the community. The chair of the LSD committee is Terri-Lynn Davis.

== See also ==
- List of communities in Newfoundland and Labrador
- List of designated places in Newfoundland and Labrador
- List of local service districts in Newfoundland and Labrador
