= Thornlea, Newfoundland and Labrador =

Thornlea
- Local service district / designated place
- Location of Thornlea Thornlea (Canada)
- Coordinates: 47.614°N 53.716°W
- Country: Canada
- Province: Newfoundland and Labrador
- Region: Newfoundland
- Census division: 1
- Census subdivision: A

Government
  - Type: Unincorporated

Area
  - Land: 1.76 km^{2} (0.68 sq mi)

Population (2016)
  - Total: 115
- Time zone: UTC−03:30 (NST)
  - Summer (DST): UTC−02:30 (NDT)
- Area code: 709

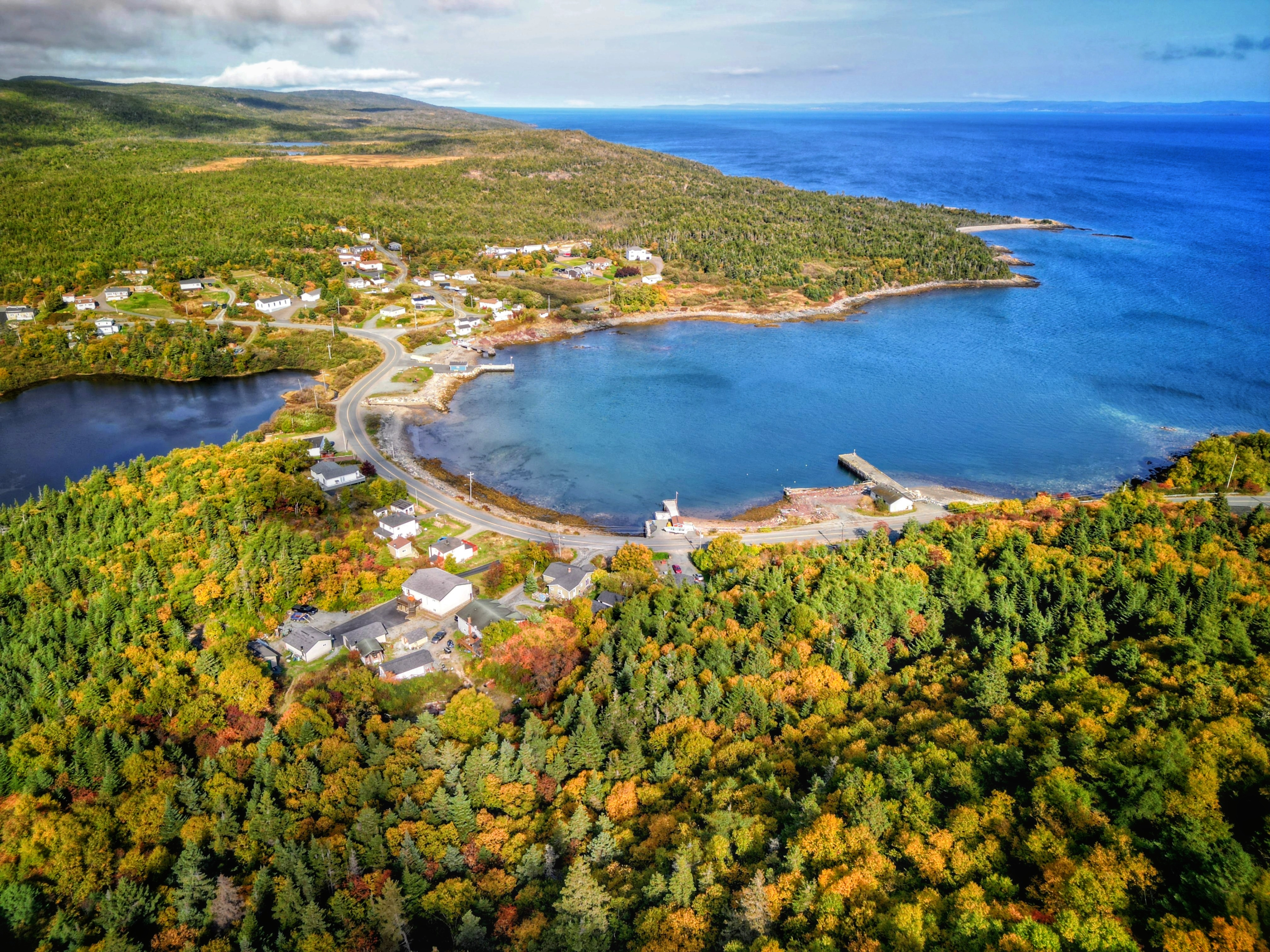
Thornlea

Thornlea is a local service district and designated place in the Canadian province of Newfoundland and Labrador.

== Geography ==
Thornlea is in Newfoundland within Subdivision A of Division No. 1.

== Demographics ==
As a designated place in the 2016 Census of Population conducted by Statistics Canada, Thornlea recorded a population of 115 living in 51 of its 66 total private dwellings, a change of 13.9% from its 2011 population of 101. With a land area of 1.76 km^{2} (0.68 sq mi), it had a population density of 65.3/km^{2} (169.2/sq mi) in 2016.

== Government ==
Thornlea is a local service district (LSD) that is governed by a committee responsible for the provision of certain services to the community. The chair of the LSD committee is Pat Murphy.

== See also ==
- List of communities in Newfoundland and Labrador
- List of designated places in Newfoundland and Labrador
- List of local service districts in Newfoundland and Labrador
