= Hickman's Harbour-Robinson Bight, Newfoundland and Labrador =

Hickman's Harbour-Robinson Bight
- Local service district / designated place
- Location of Hickman's Harbour-Robinson Bight Hickman's Harbour-Robinson Bight (Canada)
- Coordinates: 48.109°N 53.767°W
- Country: Canada
- Province: Newfoundland and Labrador
- Region: Newfoundland
- Census division: 7
- Census subdivision: L

Government
  - Type: Unincorporated

Area
  - Land: 20.73 km^{2} (8.00 sq mi)

Population (2016)
  - Total: 379
- Time zone: UTC−03:30 (NST)
  - Summer (DST): UTC−02:30 (NDT)
- Area code: 709

Hickman's Harbour-Robinson Bight is a local service district and designated place in the Canadian province of Newfoundland and Labrador.

== Geography ==
Hickman's Harbour-Robinson Bight is in Newfoundland within Subdivision L of Division No. 7.

== Demographics ==
As a designated place in the 2016 Census of Population conducted by Statistics Canada, Hickman's Harbour-Robinson Bight recorded a population of 379 living in 152 of its 213 total private dwellings, a change of −5.7% from its 2011 population of 402. With a land area of 20.73 km^{2} (8.00 sq mi), it had a population density of 18.3/km^{2} (47.4/sq mi) in 2016.

== Government ==
Hickman's Harbour-Robinson Bight is a local service district (LSD) that is governed by a committee responsible for the provision of certain services to the community. The chair of the LSD committee is Elizabeth Marsh.

== See also ==
- List of communities in Newfoundland and Labrador
- List of designated places in Newfoundland and Labrador
- List of local service districts in Newfoundland and Labrador
