= Marysvale, Newfoundland and Labrador =

Marysvale
- Local service district / designated place
- Location of Marysvale Marysvale (Canada)
- Coordinates: 47.484°N 53.228°W
- Country: Canada
- Province: Newfoundland and Labrador
- Region: Newfoundland
- Census division: 1
- Census subdivision: O

Government
  - Type: Unincorporated

Area
  - Land: 5.32 km^{2} (2.05 sq mi)

Population (2016)
  - Total: 419
- Time zone: UTC−03:30 (NST)
  - Summer (DST): UTC−02:30 (NDT)
- Area code: 709

Marysvale is a local service district and designated place in the Canadian province of Newfoundland and Labrador.

== Geography ==
Marysvale is in Newfoundland partly within Subdivision N and Subdivision O of Division No. 1.

== Demographics ==
As a designated place in the 2016 Census of Population conducted by Statistics Canada, Marysvale recorded a population of 562 living in 247 of its 395 total private dwellings, a change of −9.2% from its 2011 population of 619. With a land area of 10.43 km^{2} (4.03 sq mi), it had a population density of 53.9/km^{2} (139.6/sq mi) in 2016.

== Government ==
Marysvale is a local service district (LSD) that is governed by a committee responsible for the provision of certain services to the community. The chair of the LSD committee is Mary Alice Lush.

== See also ==
- List of communities in Newfoundland and Labrador
- List of designated places in Newfoundland and Labrador
- List of local service districts in Newfoundland and Labrador
