= Piccadilly Head, Newfoundland and Labrador =

Piccadilly Head
- Local service district / designated place
- Location of Piccadilly Head Piccadilly Head (Canada)
- Coordinates: 48.592°N 58.928°W
- Country: Canada
- Province: Newfoundland and Labrador
- Region: Newfoundland
- Census division: 4
- Census subdivision: E

Government
  - Type: Unincorporated

Area
  - Land: 2.99 km^{2} (1.15 sq mi)

Population (2021)
  - Total: 112
- Time zone: UTC−03:30 (NST)
  - Summer (DST): UTC−02:30 (NDT)
- Area code: 709

Piccadilly Head is a local service district and designated place in the Canadian province of Newfoundland and Labrador.

== Geography ==
Piccadilly Head is in Newfoundland within Subdivision E of Division No. 4.

== Demographics ==
As a designated place in the 2021 Census of Population conducted by Statistics Canada, Piccadilly Head recorded a population of 112 living in 61 of its 77 total private dwellings, a change of −8.6% from its 2016 population of 124. With a land area of 2.99 km^{2} (1.15 sq mi), it had a population density of 41.5/km^{2} (107.4/sq mi) in 2016.

== Government ==
Piccadilly Head is a local service district (LSD) that is governed by a committee responsible for the provision of certain services to the community. The chair of the LSD committee is Calwyn Dollard.

== See also ==
- List of communities in Newfoundland and Labrador
- List of designated places in Newfoundland and Labrador
- List of local service districts in Newfoundland and Labrador
