= Random Island West, Newfoundland and Labrador =

Random Island West
- Local service district / designated place
- Location of Random Island West Random Island West (Canada)
- Coordinates: 48.146°N 53.868°W
- Country: Canada
- Province: Newfoundland and Labrador
- Region: Newfoundland
- Census division: 7
- Census subdivision: L

Government
  - Type: Unincorporated

Area
  - Land: 75.59 km^{2} (29.19 sq mi)

Population (2016)
  - Total: 535
- Time zone: UTC−03:30 (NST)
  - Summer (DST): UTC−02:30 (NDT)
- Area code: 709

Random Island West is a local service district and designated place in the Canadian province of Newfoundland and Labrador.

== Geography ==
Random Island West is in Newfoundland within Subdivision L of Division No. 7.

== Demographics ==
As a designated place in the 2016 Census of Population conducted by Statistics Canada, Random Island West recorded a population of 535 living in 239 of its 302 total private dwellings, a change of 0.9% from its 2011 population of 530. With a land area of 75.59 km^{2} (29.19 sq mi), it had a population density of 7.1/km^{2} (18.3/sq mi) in 2016.

== Government ==
Random Island West is a local service district (LSD) that is governed by a committee responsible for the provision of certain services to the community. The chair of the LSD committee is James Cook.

== See also ==
- List of communities in Newfoundland and Labrador
- List of designated places in Newfoundland and Labrador
- List of local service districts in Newfoundland and Labrador
