= West Bay, Newfoundland and Labrador =

West Bay
- Local service district / designated place
- Location of West Bay West Bay (Canada)
- Coordinates: 48.619°N 58.976°W
- Country: Canada
- Province: Newfoundland and Labrador
- Region: Newfoundland
- Census division: 4
- Census subdivision: E

Government
  - Type: Unincorporated

Area
  - Land: 10.58 km^{2} (4.08 sq mi)

Population (2016)
  - Total: 235
- Time zone: UTC−03:30 (NST)
  - Summer (DST): UTC−02:30 (NDT)
- Area code: 709

West Bay is a local service district and designated place in the Canadian province of Newfoundland and Labrador.

== Geography ==
West Bay is in Newfoundland within Subdivision E of Division No. 4.

== Demographics ==
As a designated place in the 2016 Census of Population conducted by Statistics Canada, West Bay recorded a population of 235 living in 103 of its 124 total private dwellings, a change of −13.9% from its 2011 population of 273. With a land area of 10.58 km^{2} (4.08 sq mi), it had a population density of 22.2/km^{2} (57.5/sq mi) in 2016.

== Government ==
West Bay is a local service district (LSD) that is governed by a committee responsible for the provision of certain services to the community. The chair of the LSD committee is Amanda LePrieur.

== See also ==
- List of communities in Newfoundland and Labrador
- List of designated places in Newfoundland and Labrador
- List of local service districts in Newfoundland and Labrador
