= Little Harbour (East), Placentia Bay, Newfoundland and Labrador =

Little Harbour (East)
- Local service district / designated place
- Location of Little Harbour (East) Little Harbour (East) (Canada)
- Coordinates: 47.648°N 53.936°W
- Country: Canada
- Province: Newfoundland and Labrador
- Region: Newfoundland
- Census division: 1
- Census subdivision: A

Government
  - Type: Unincorporated

Area
  - Land: 1.81 km^{2} (0.70 sq mi)

Population (2016)
  - Total: 91
- Time zone: UTC−03:30 (NST)
  - Summer (DST): UTC−02:30 (NDT)
- Area code: 709

Little Harbour (East) is a local service district and designated place in the Canadian province of Newfoundland and Labrador on the Placentia Bay of the island of Newfoundland.

== Geography ==
Little Harbour (East) is in Newfoundland within Subdivision A of Division No. 1.

== Demographics ==
As a designated place in the 2016 Census of Population conducted by Statistics Canada, Little Harbour (East) recorded a population of 91 living in 48 of its 68 total private dwellings, a change of −18% from its 2011 population of 111. With a land area of 1.81 km^{2} (0.70 sq mi), it had a population density of 50.3/km^{2} (130.2/sq mi) in 2016.

== Government ==
Little Harbour (East), Placentia Bay is a local service district (LSD) that is governed by a committee responsible for the provision of certain services to the community. The chair of the LSD committee is Marcella Hickey.

== See also ==
- List of communities in Newfoundland and Labrador
- List of designated places in Newfoundland and Labrador
- List of local service districts in Newfoundland and Labrador
