= Cape Freels North, Newfoundland and Labrador =

Cape Freels North
- Local service district / designated place
- Location of Cape Freels North Cape Freels North (Canada)
- Coordinates: 49.264°N 53.506°W
- Country: Canada
- Province: Newfoundland and Labrador
- Region: Newfoundland
- Census division: 7
- Census subdivision: A

Government
  - Type: Unincorporated

Area
  - Land: 2.67 km^{2} (1.03 sq mi)

Population (2016)
  - Total: 118
- Time zone: UTC−03:30 (NST)
  - Summer (DST): UTC−02:30 (NDT)
- Area code: 709

Cape Freels North is a local service district and designated place in the Canadian province of Newfoundland and Labrador.

== Geography ==
Cape Freels North is in Newfoundland within Subdivision A of Division No. 7.

== Demographics ==
As a designated place in the 2016 Census of Population conducted by Statistics Canada, Cape Freels North recorded a population of 118 living in 44 of its 51 total private dwellings, a change of −4.1% from its 2011 population of 123. With a land area of 2.67 km^{2} (1.03 sq mi), it had a population density of 44.2/km^{2} (114.5/sq mi) in 2016.

== Government ==
Cape Freels North is a local service district (LSD) that is governed by a committee responsible for the provision of certain services to the community. The chair of the LSD committee is Elizabeth Stagg.

== See also ==
- List of communities in Newfoundland and Labrador
- List of designated places in Newfoundland and Labrador
- List of local service districts in Newfoundland and Labrador
