= Millville to Cape Anguille, Newfoundland and Labrador =

Millville to Cape Anguille
- Designated place
- Location of Millville to Cape Anguille Millville to Cape Anguille (Canada)
- Coordinates: 47.869°N 59.359°W
- Country: Canada
- Province: Newfoundland and Labrador
- Region: Newfoundland
- Census division: 4
- Census subdivision: A

Government
  - Type: Unincorporated

Area
  - Land: 17.15 km^{2} (6.62 sq mi)

Population (2016)
  - Total: 363
- Time zone: UTC−03:30 (NST)
  - Summer (DST): UTC−02:30 (NDT)
- Area code: 709

Millville to Cape Anguille is a designated place in the Canadian province of Newfoundland and Labrador.

== Geography ==
Millville to Cape Anguille is in Newfoundland within Subdivision A of Division No. 4.

== Demographics ==
As a designated place in the 2016 Census of Population conducted by Statistics Canada, Millville to Cape Anguille recorded a population of 363 living in 159 of its 167 total private dwellings, a change of −23.6% from its 2011 population of 475. With a land area of 17.15 km^{2} (6.62 sq mi), it had a population density of 21.2/km^{2} (54.8/sq mi) in 2016.

== See also ==
- List of communities in Newfoundland and Labrador
- List of designated places in Newfoundland and Labrador
