= Smith's Sound, Newfoundland and Labrador =

Smith's Sound
- Local service district / designated place
- Location of Smith's Sound Smith's Sound (Canada)
- Coordinates: 48.211°N 53.844°W
- Country: Canada
- Province: Newfoundland and Labrador
- Region: Newfoundland
- Census division: 7
- Census subdivision: K

Government
  - Type: Unincorporated

Area
  - Land: 26.27 km^{2} (10.14 sq mi)

Population (2016)
  - Total: 366
- Time zone: UTC−03:30 (NST)
  - Summer (DST): UTC−02:30 (NDT)
- Area code: 709

Smith's Sound is a local service district and designated place in the Canadian province of Newfoundland and Labrador.

== Geography ==
Smith's Sound is in Newfoundland within Subdivision K of Division No. 7.

== Demographics ==
As a designated place in the 2016 Census of Population conducted by Statistics Canada, Smith's Sound recorded a population of 366 living in 154 of its 196 total private dwellings, a change of 15.5% from its 2011 population of 317. With a land area of 26.27 km^{2} (10.14 sq mi), it had a population density of 13.9/km^{2} (36.1/sq mi) in 2016.

== Government ==
Smith's Sound is a local service district (LSD) that is governed by a committee responsible for the provision of certain services to the community. The chair of the LSD committee is Alisha Keats.

== See also ==
- List of communities in Newfoundland and Labrador
- List of designated places in Newfoundland and Labrador
- List of local service districts in Newfoundland and Labrador
