= O'Regan's Central, Newfoundland and Labrador =

O'Regan's Central
- Local service district / designated place
- Location of O'Regan's Central O'Regan's Central (Canada)
- Coordinates: 47.866°N 59.182°W
- Country: Canada
- Province: Newfoundland and Labrador
- Region: Newfoundland
- Census division: 4
- Census subdivision: A

Government
  - Type: Unincorporated

Area
  - Land: 23.63 km^{2} (9.12 sq mi)

Population (2016)
  - Total: 107
- Time zone: UTC−03:30 (NST)
  - Summer (DST): UTC−02:30 (NDT)
- Area code: 709

O'Regan's Central is a local service district and designated place in the Canadian province of Newfoundland and Labrador.

== Geography ==
O'Regan's Central is in Newfoundland within Subdivision A of Division No. 4.

== Demographics ==
As a designated place in the 2016 Census of Population conducted by Statistics Canada, O'Regan's Central recorded a population of 107 living in 52 of its 55 total private dwellings, a change of 0% from its 2011 population of 107. With a land area of 23.63 km^{2} (9.12 sq mi), it had a population density of 4.5/km^{2} (11.7/sq mi) in 2016.

== Government ==
O'Regan's Central is a local service district (LSD) that is governed by a committee responsible for the provision of certain services to the community. The chair of the LSD committee is John Skinner.

== See also ==
- List of communities in Newfoundland and Labrador
- List of designated places in Newfoundland and Labrador
- List of local service districts in Newfoundland and Labrador
