= Charlottetown, Bonavista Bay, Newfoundland and Labrador =

Charlottetown
- Local service district / designated place
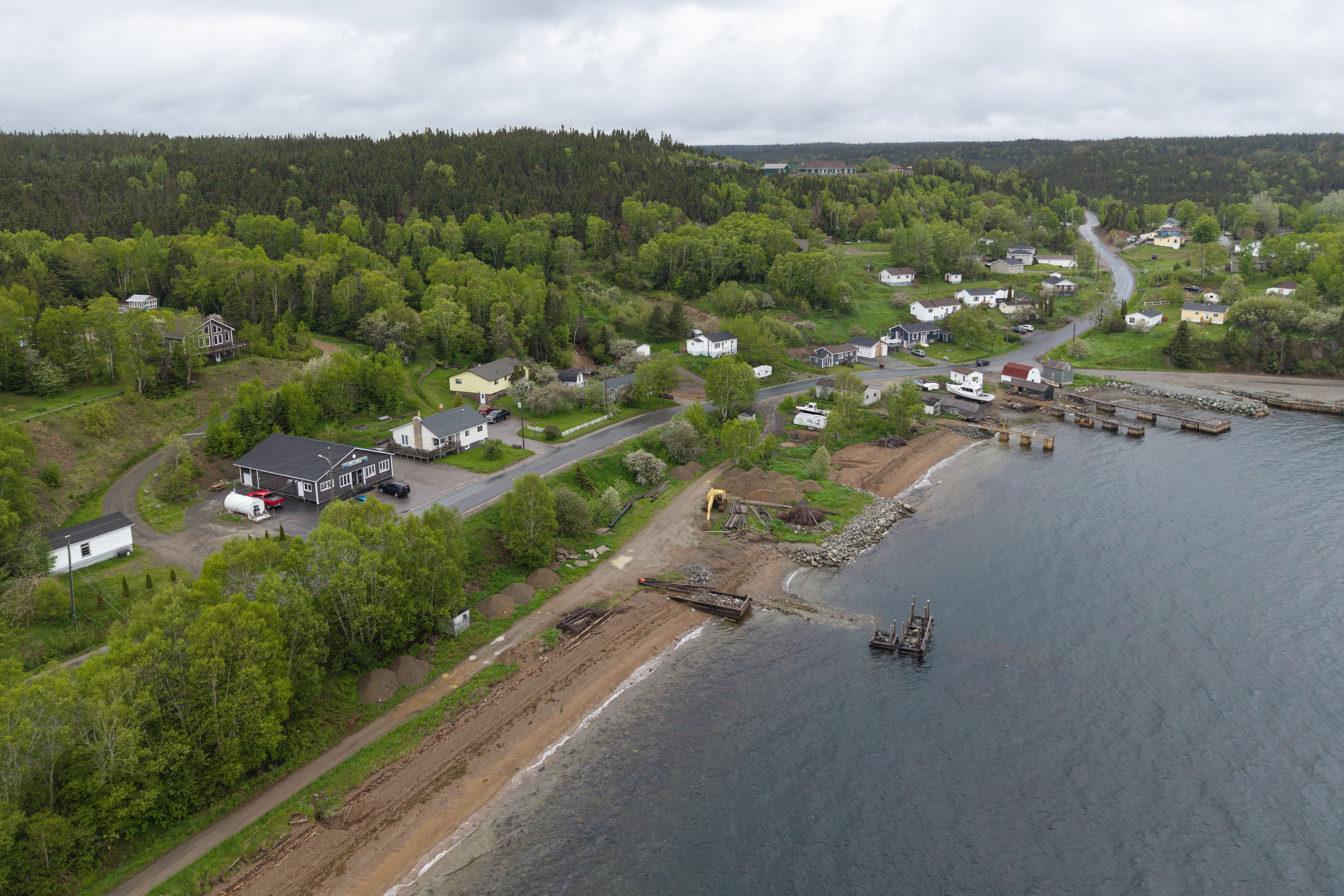
- Charlottetown in 2026

- Location of Charlottetown, Newfoundland
- Coordinates: 48°26′02″N 54°00′25″W
- Country: Canada
- Province: Newfoundland and Labrador
- Census division: 10
- Time zone: UTC-3:30 (NST)
  - Summer (DST): UTC-2:30 (NDT)
- Highways: Route 1 (TCH)

Charlottetown, Bonavista Bay is a local service district and designated place in the Canadian province of Newfoundland and Labrador. It is on the island of Newfoundland within Terra Nova National Park.

== Geography ==
Charlottetown, Bonavista Bay is in Newfoundland within Subdivision E of Division No. 7.

== Demographics ==
As a designated place in the 2016 Census of Population conducted by Statistics Canada, Charlottetown, Bonavista Bay recorded a population of 227 living in 101 of its 109 total private dwellings, a change of −14% from its 2011 population of 264. With a land area of 2.9 km^{2} (1.1 sq mi), it had a population density of 78.3/km^{2} (202.7/sq mi) in 2016.

== Government ==
Charlottetown, Bonavista Bay is a local service district (LSD) that is governed by a committee responsible for the provision of certain services to the community. The chair of the LSD committee is Dave Weinheber.

== See also ==
- List of communities in Newfoundland and Labrador
- List of designated places in Newfoundland and Labrador
- List of local service districts in Newfoundland and Labrador
