= Random Sound West =

Random Sound West Hillview-Adeytown-Hatchet Cove-St. Jones Within
- Local service district / designated place
- Location of Random Sound West Random Sound West (Canada)
- Coordinates: 48.051°N 53.853°W
- Country: Canada
- Province: Newfoundland and Labrador
- Region: Newfoundland
- Census division: 7
- Census subdivision: M

Government
  - Type: Unincorporated

Area
  - Land: 29.96 km^{2} (11.57 sq mi)

Population (2016)
  - Total: 436
- Time zone: UTC−03:30 (NST)
  - Summer (DST): UTC−02:30 (NDT)
- Area code: 709

Random Sound West, previously known as Hillview-Adeytown-Hatchet Cove-St. Jones Within, is a local service district and designated place in the Canadian province of Newfoundland and Labrador.

== Geography ==
Random Sound West is in Newfoundland within Subdivision M of Division No. 7.

== Demographics ==
As a designated place in the 2016 Census of Population conducted by Statistics Canada, Hillview-Adeytown-Hatchet Cove-St. Jones Within (now Random Sound West) recorded a population of 436 living in 198 of its 261 total private dwellings, a change of −0.5% from its 2011 population of 438. With a land area of 29.96 km^{2} (11.57 sq mi), it had a population density of 14.6/km^{2} (37.7/sq mi) in 2016.

== Government ==
Random Sound West is a local service district (LSD) that is governed by a committee responsible for the provision of certain services to the community. The chair of the LSD committee is Robert Gammon.

== See also ==
- List of communities in Newfoundland and Labrador
- List of designated places in Newfoundland and Labrador
- List of local service districts in Newfoundland and Labrador
