= Campbells Creek, Newfoundland and Labrador =

Campbells Creek
- Local service district / designated place
- Location of Campbells Creek Campbells Creek (Canada)
- Coordinates: 48.525°N 58.867°W
- Country: Canada
- Province: Newfoundland and Labrador
- Region: Newfoundland
- Census division: 4
- Census subdivision: E

Government
  - Type: Unincorporated

Area
  - Land: 1.52 km^{2} (0.59 sq mi)

Population (2016)
  - Total: 72
- Time zone: UTC−03:30 (NST)
  - Summer (DST): UTC−02:30 (NDT)
- Area code: 709

Campbells Creek is a local service district and designated place in the Canadian province of Newfoundland and Labrador.

== Geography ==
Campbells Creek is in Newfoundland partly within Subdivision D and Subdivision E of Division No. 4.

== Demographics ==
As a designated place in the 2016 Census of Population conducted by Statistics Canada, Campbells Creek recorded a population of 113 living in 45 of its 47 total private dwellings, a change of 22.8% from its 2011 population of 92. With a land area of 2.44 km^{2} (0.94 sq mi), it had a population density of 46.3/km^{2} (119.9/sq mi) in 2016.

== Government ==
Campbells Creek is a local service district (LSD) that is governed by a committee responsible for the provision of certain services to the community. The chair of the LSD committee is Laetitia MacDonald.

== See also ==
- List of communities in Newfoundland and Labrador
- List of designated places in Newfoundland and Labrador
- List of local service districts in Newfoundland and Labrador
