= Fairhaven, Newfoundland and Labrador =

Fairhaven
- Local service district / designated place
- Location of Fairhaven Fairhaven (Canada)
- Coordinates: 47.537°N 53.89°W
- Country: Canada
- Province: Newfoundland and Labrador
- Region: Newfoundland
- Census division: 1
- Census subdivision: A

Government
  - Type: Unincorporated

Area
  - Land: 5.89 km^{2} (2.27 sq mi)

Population (2016)
  - Total: 85
- Time zone: UTC−03:30 (NST)
  - Summer (DST): UTC−02:30 (NDT)
- Area code: 709

Fairhaven is a local service district and designated place in the Canadian province of Newfoundland and Labrador.

== Geography ==
Fairhaven is in Newfoundland within Subdivision A of Division No. 1.

== Demographics ==
As a designated place in the 2016 Census of Population conducted by Statistics Canada, Fairhaven recorded a population of 85 living in 42 of its 53 total private dwellings, a change of 0% from its 2011 population of 85. With a land area of 5.89 km^{2} (2.27 sq mi), it had a population density of 14.4/km^{2} (37.4/sq mi) in 2016.

== Government ==
Fairhaven is a local service district (LSD) that is governed by a committee responsible for the provision of certain services to the community. The chair of the LSD committee is Effie Crann.

== See also ==
- List of communities in Newfoundland and Labrador
- List of designated places in Newfoundland and Labrador
- List of local service districts in Newfoundland and Labrador
