= Burnt Cove, St. Michael's, Bauline South, Newfoundland and Labrador =

Burnt Cove, St. Michael's, Bauline South
- Local service district / designated place
- Location of Burnt Cove, St. Michael's, Bauline South Burnt Cove, St. Michael's, Bauline South (Canada)
- Coordinates: 47.188°N 52.858°W
- Country: Canada
- Province: Newfoundland and Labrador
- Region: Newfoundland
- Census division: 1
- Census subdivision: U

Government
  - Type: Unincorporated

Area
  - Land: 8.64 km^{2} (3.34 sq mi)

Population (2016)
  - Total: 316
- Time zone: UTC−03:30 (NST)
  - Summer (DST): UTC−02:30 (NDT)
- Area code: 709

Burnt Cove, St. Michael's, Bauline South is a local service district and designated place in the Canadian province of Newfoundland and Labrador.

== Geography ==
Burnt Cove, St. Michael's, Bauline South is in Newfoundland within Subdivision U of Division No. 1.

== Demographics ==
As a designated place in the 2016 Census of Population conducted by Statistics Canada, Burnt Cove, St. Michael's, Bauline South recorded a population of 316 living in 120 of its 140 total private dwellings, a change of 2.6% from its 2011 population of 308. With a land area of 8.64 km^{2} (3.34 sq mi), it had a population density of 36.6/km^{2} (94.7/sq mi) in 2016.

== Government ==
Burnt Cove, St. Michael's, Bauline South is a local service district (LSD) that is governed by a committee responsible for the provision of certain services to the community. The chair of the LSD committee is Diane Tee.

== See also ==
- List of communities in Newfoundland and Labrador
- List of designated places in Newfoundland and Labrador
- List of local service districts in Newfoundland and Labrador
