= Freshwater, Conception Bay, Newfoundland and Labrador =

Settlement in Conception Bay, Newfoundland, Canada

Coordinates: 47.755°N 53.184°W

Location of Freshwater in Newfoundland and Labrador

Freshwater is a local service district and designated place in the Canadian province of Newfoundland and Labrador.

== Geography ==
Freshwater, Conception Bay is in Newfoundland within Subdivision H of Division No. 1.

== Demographics ==
As a designated place in the 2016 Census of Population conducted by Statistics Canada, Freshwater, Conception Bay recorded a population of 228 living in 99 of its 147 total private dwellings, a change of 3.6% from its 2011 population of 220. With a land area of 6.93 km^{2} (2.68 sq mi), it had a population density of 32.9/km^{2} (85.2/sq mi) in 2016.

== Government ==
Freshwater, Conception Bay is a local service district (LSD) that is governed by a committee responsible for the provision of certain services to the community. The chair of the LSD committee is John Parsons.

== See also ==
- List of communities in Newfoundland and Labrador
- List of designated places in Newfoundland and Labrador
- List of local service districts in Newfoundland and Labrador
