= Canning's Cove =

Local service district and designated place in Canada

Coordinates: 48.444°N 53.848°W

Location of Canning's Cove in Newfoundland and Labrador

Canning's Cove is a local service district and designated place in the Canadian province of Newfoundland and Labrador. It is on the Bonavista Bay.

== Geography ==
Canning's Cove is in Newfoundland within Subdivision E of Division No. 7.

== Demographics ==
As a designated place in the 2016 Census of Population conducted by Statistics Canada, Canning's Cove recorded a population of 231 living in 102 of its 128 total private dwellings, a change of -12.5% from its 2011 population of 264. With a land area of 4.25 km^{2} (1.64 sq mi), it had a population density of 54.4/km^{2} (140.8/sq mi) in 2016.

== Government ==
Canning's Cove is a local service district (LSD) that is governed by a committee responsible for the provision of certain services to the community. The chair of the LSD committee is Melvin Simmonds.

== See also ==
- List of communities in Newfoundland and Labrador
- List of designated places in Newfoundland and Labrador
- List of local service districts in Newfoundland and Labrador
