= Forest Field-New Bridge, Newfoundland and Labrador =

Forest Field-New Bridge
- Local service district / designated place
- Location of Forest Field-New Bridge Forest Field-New Bridge (Canada)
- Coordinates: 47.146°N 53.452°W
- Country: Canada
- Province: Newfoundland and Labrador
- Region: Newfoundland
- Census division: 1
- Census subdivision: W

Government
  - Type: Unincorporated

Area
  - Land: 10.95 km^{2} (4.23 sq mi)

Population (2016)
  - Total: 52
- Time zone: UTC−03:30 (NST)
  - Summer (DST): UTC−02:30 (NDT)
- Area code: 709

Forest Field-New Bridge is a local service district and designated place in the Canadian province of Newfoundland and Labrador.

== Geography ==
Forest Field-New Bridge is in Newfoundland within Subdivision W of Division No. 1.

== Demographics ==
As a designated place in the 2016 Census of Population conducted by Statistics Canada, Forest Field-New Bridge recorded a population of 52 living in 27 of its 39 total private dwellings, a change of −25.7% from its 2011 population of 70. With a land area of 10.95 km^{2} (4.23 sq mi), it had a population density of 4.7/km^{2} (12.3/sq mi) in 2016.

== Government ==
Forest Field-New Bridge is a local service district (LSD) that is governed by a committee responsible for the provision of certain services to the community. The chair of the LSD committee is Marjorie Gibbons.

== See also ==
- List of communities in Newfoundland and Labrador
- List of designated places in Newfoundland and Labrador
- List of local service districts in Newfoundland and Labrador
