= Piccadilly Slant-Abraham's Cove =

- Local service district / designated place
- Location of Piccadilly Slant-Abraham's Cove in Newfoundland
- Coordinates: 48°31′11″N 58°54′51″W
- Country: Canada
- Province: Newfoundland and Labrador
- Settled: late 1800s

Population (2021)
  - Total: 350
- Time zone: UTC-3:30 (Newfoundland Time)
  - Summer (DST): UTC-2:30 (Newfoundland Daylight)
- Area code: 709
- Highways: Route 460; Route 463

Piccadilly Slant-Abraham's Cove is a local service district and designated place in the Canadian province of Newfoundland and Labrador. It is located on the island of Newfoundland, along St. George's Bay, on the Port au Port Peninsula. The DPL consists of the fishing villages of Abraham's Cove and Piccadilly.

== Geography ==
Piccadilly Slant-Abraham's Cove is in Newfoundland within Subdivision E of Division No. 4.

=== Communities ===
Abraham's Cove

According to the local population, the Abraham's Cove site was first settled in the late 19th century by the Duffey family, of mixed Acadian and Mi'kmaq ancestry. The population kept livestock and fished for cod, herring, and lobster. With the increasing scarcity of commercial fish, many residents found employment in the nearby Ernest Harmon US AFB in Stephenville, which operated from 1941 to 1966, or at the provincial highways depot. Today, very few local residents still engage in fishing, and many men and women seek seasonal employment elsewhere in the province or in Nova Scotia.

Piccadilly

Piccadilly has its own liquor and confectionery store, which is called Parkview. Its park is located a kilometre from Parkview. It is a beautiful place for camping, the beach is sandy and a lot of people swim and go clamming on the shoals. It has a great view of the bay and nature trails. Camp sites, water, bathrooms, changing rooms, and electricity are available. Down the road about one kilometre is Piccadilly Central High School, which is located near a body of water called Piccadilly Bay which end at an old wooden bridge known as "The Big Hole". There is a wharf across from the Colliers, and marine centre, where the fishermen sell lobsters and fish. There is a church called Our Lady of Fatima where the community gathers on Sundays. In the early 1960s, Piccadilly housed the only theatre west of Stephenville. It was known for showing very old, black and white movies during the winter months while warming its clientele with a wood-burning stove.

== Demographics ==
As a designated place in the 2021 Census of Population conducted by Statistics Canada, Piccadilly Slant-Abraham's Cove recorded a population of 350 living in 163 of its 181 total private dwellings, a change of −5.8% from its 2016 population of 372. With a land area of 16.45 km^{2} (6.35 sq mi), it had a population density of 22.6/km^{2} (58.6/sq mi) in 2016.

== Government ==
Piccadilly Slant-Abraham's Cove is a local service district (LSD) that is governed by a committee responsible for the provision of certain services to the community. The chair of the LSD committee is Troy Skinner.

== Education ==
Piccadilly Central High School opened its doors to high school students on the Port au Port Peninsula in September 1998. After being an elementary school since 1975.

== See also ==
- List of communities in Newfoundland and Labrador
- List of designated places in Newfoundland and Labrador
- List of local service districts in Newfoundland and Labrador
