= Mattis Point =

Local service district in Canada

Location of Mattis Point in Newfoundland and Labrador

Mattis Point is a local service district and designated place in the Canadian province of Newfoundland and Labrador. It is in the Bay St. George area.

== Geography ==
Mattis Point is in Newfoundland within Subdivision C of Division No. 4.

== Demographics ==
As a designated place in the 2016 Census of Population conducted by Statistics Canada, Mattis Point recorded a population of 132 living in 56 of its 59 total private dwellings, a change of 2.3% from its 2011 population of 129. With a land area of 6.49 km^{2} (2.51 sq mi), it had a population density of 20.3/km^{2} (52.7/sq mi) in 2016.

== Government ==
Mattis Point is a local service district (LSD) that is governed by a committee responsible for the provision of certain services to the community. The chair of the LSD committee is Cynthia Bennett.

== See also ==
- List of communities in Newfoundland and Labrador
- List of designated places in Newfoundland and Labrador
- List of local service districts in Newfoundland and Labrador
