= Fox Roost-Margaree, Newfoundland and Labrador =

Fox Roost-Margaree
- Local service district / designated place
- Location of Fox Roost-Margaree Fox Roost-Margaree (Canada)
- Coordinates: 47.59°N 59.039°W
- Country: Canada
- Province: Newfoundland and Labrador
- Region: Newfoundland
- Census division: 3
- Census subdivision: H

Government
  - Type: Unincorporated

Area
  - Land: 17.69 km^{2} (6.83 sq mi)

Population (2016)
  - Total: 327
- Time zone: UTC−03:30 (NST)
  - Summer (DST): UTC−02:30 (NDT)
- Area code: 709

Fox Roost-Margaree is a local service district and designated place in the Canadian province of Newfoundland and Labrador.

== Geography ==
Fox Roost-Margaree is in Newfoundland within Subdivision H of Division No. 3.

== Demographics ==
As a designated place in the 2016 Census of Population conducted by Statistics Canada, Fox Roost-Margaree recorded a population of 327 living in 133 of its 136 total private dwellings, a change of −2.1% from its 2011 population of 334. With a land area of 17.69 km^{2} (6.83 sq mi), it had a population density of 18.5/km^{2} (47.9/sq mi) in 2016.

== Government ==
Fox Roost-Margaree is a local service district (LSD) that is governed by a committee responsible for the provision of certain services to the community. The chair of the LSD committee is Dwayne Vautier.

== See also ==
- List of communities in Newfoundland and Labrador
- List of designated places in Newfoundland and Labrador
- List of local service districts in Newfoundland and Labrador
