= Benoits Siding =

Local service district in Canada

Coordinates: 47°52′07″N 59°06′53″W

Location of Benoits Siding in Newfoundland and Labrador

Benoits Siding is a local service district and designated place in the Canadian province of Newfoundland and Labrador.

== Geography ==
Benoits Siding is in Newfoundland within Subdivision A of Division No. 4.

== Demographics ==
As a designated place in the 2016 Census of Population conducted by Statistics Canada, Benoits Siding recorded a population of 32 living in 14 of its 18 total private dwellings, a change of 540% from its 2011 population of 5. With a land area of 6.23 km^{2} (2.41 sq mi), it had a population density of 5.1/km^{2} (13.3/sq mi) in 2016.

== Government ==
Benoits Siding is a local service district (LSD) that is governed by a committee responsible for the provision of certain services to the community. The chair of the LSD committee is Cathy Bartlett.

== See also ==
- List of communities in Newfoundland and Labrador
- List of designated places in Newfoundland and Labrador
- List of local service districts in Newfoundland and Labrador
