= Bunyan's Cove =

Human settlement in Newfoundland and Labrador, Canada

Coordinates: 48.397°N 54.021°W

Location of Bunyan's Cove in Newfoundland and Labrador

Bunyan's Cove is a local service district and designated place in the Canadian province of Newfoundland and Labrador.

== Geography ==
Bunyan's Cove is in Newfoundland within Subdivision E of Division No. 7.

== Demographics ==
As a designated place in the 2016 Census of Population conducted by Statistics Canada, Bunyan's Cove recorded a population of 457 living in 190 of its 228 total private dwellings, a change of -2.1% from its 2011 population of 467. With a land area of 10.33 km^{2} (3.99 sq mi), it had a population density of 44.2/km^{2} (114.6/sq mi) in 2016.

== Government ==
Bunyan's Cove is a local service district (LSD) that is governed by a committee responsible for the provision of certain services to the community. The chair of the LSD committee is Ruby Nicholson.

== See also ==
- List of communities in Newfoundland and Labrador
- List of designated places in Newfoundland and Labrador
- List of local service districts in Newfoundland and Labrador
