= Barachois Brook =

Local service district in Canada

Coordinates: 48°27′00″N 58°25′57″W

Barachois Brook is a local service district and designated place in the Canadian province of Newfoundland and Labrador. It is on the western coast of the province, on Bay St. George, located just 5 km south of Stephenville Crossing.

"Black Bank", a popular beach, is located in Barachois Brook. It had an estimated population of 150 in 2021.

The post office was established there in 1963. The first Postmaster was Churchill J. Messervey.

Barachois Brook once had a RCMP detachment which is no longer in use. The building, located just outside of St. George's on the outer edge of the community, is now used by the provincial government as a Forestry Resource office.

== Geography ==
Barachois Brook is in Newfoundland within Subdivision C of Division No. 4.

== Demographics ==
As a designated place in the 2016 Census of Population conducted by Statistics Canada, Barachois Brook recorded a population of 167 living in 84 of its 95 total private dwellings, a change of 34.7% from its 2011 population of 124. With a land area of 6.32 km^{2} (2.44 sq mi), it had a population density of 26.4/km^{2} (68.4/sq mi) in 2016.

== Government ==
Barachois Brook is a local service district (LSD) that is governed by a committee responsible for the provision of certain services to the community. The chair of the LSD committee is Gerard Lee.

== See also ==
- List of communities in Newfoundland and Labrador
- List of designated places in Newfoundland and Labrador
- List of local service districts in Newfoundland and Labrador
