= Black Duck, Newfoundland and Labrador =

Local service district in Canada

Coordinates: 48.572°N 58.381°W

Location of Black Duck in Newfoundland and Labrador

Black Duck (also known as Black Duck Siding) is a local service district and designated place in the Canadian province of Newfoundland and Labrador that is 15 km (9 mi) east of the town of Stephenville. It is characterized by Harry's River, which runs past the community and is an Atlantic salmon fishing river.

Black Duck is known as the retirement place of Captain Victor Campbell RN, the Antarctic explorer who established a community of expats there in the 1920s.

== Geography ==
Black Duck is in Newfoundland and straddles the boundary Subdivision C and Subdivision D, both within Division No. 4.

== Demographics ==
As a designated place in the 2016 Census of Population conducted by Statistics Canada, Black Duck recorded a population of 110 living in 48 of its 60 total private dwellings, a change of 11.1% from its 2011 population of 99. With a land area of 19.75 km^{2} (7.63 sq mi), it had a population density of 5.6/km^{2} (14.4/sq mi) in 2016.

== Government ==
Black Duck is a local service district (LSD)of the Town of Stephenville Crossing. that is governed by a committee responsible for the provision of certain services to the community.

== See also ==
- List of communities in Newfoundland and Labrador
- List of designated places in Newfoundland and Labrador
- List of local service districts in Newfoundland and Labrador
