= St. Teresa, Newfoundland and Labrador =

Local service district in Canada

Coordinates: 48.364°N 58.642°W

Location of St. Teresa in Newfoundland and Labrador

St. Teresa is a local service district and designated place in the Canadian province of Newfoundland and Labrador.

== Geography ==
St. Teresa is in Newfoundland within Subdivision C of Division No. 4.

== Demographics ==
As a designated place in the 2016 Census of Population conducted by Statistics Canada, St. Teresa recorded a population of 82 living in 34 of its 35 total private dwellings, a change of -47.4% from its 2011 population of 156. With a land area of 9.16 km^{2} (3.54 sq mi), it had a population density of 9.0/km^{2} (23.2/sq mi) in 2016.

== Government ==
St. Teresa is a local service district (LSD) that is governed by a committee responsible for the provision of certain services to the community. The chair of the LSD committee is Not Active.

== See also ==
- List of communities in Newfoundland and Labrador
- List of designated places in Newfoundland and Labrador
- List of local service districts in Newfoundland and Labrador
