= Georgetown, Newfoundland and Labrador =

Local service district in Canada

Coordinates: 47°30′11″N 53°13′00″W

Georgetown is a local service district and designated place in the Canadian province of Newfoundland and Labrador. It is southeast of Bay Roberts. It had a population of 166 in 1956.

== Geography ==
Georgetown is in Newfoundland within Subdivision N of Division No. 1.

== Demographics ==
As a designated place in the 2016 Census of Population conducted by Statistics Canada, Georgetown recorded a population of 229 living in 97 of its 127 total private dwellings, a change of 35.5% from its 2011 population of 169. With a land area of 3.32 km^{2} (1.28 sq mi), it had a population density of 69.0/km^{2} (178.6/sq mi) in 2016.

== Government ==
Georgetown is a local service district (LSD) that is governed by a committee responsible for the provision of certain services to the community. The chair of the LSD committee is Leonard Walsh.

== See also ==
- List of communities in Newfoundland and Labrador
- List of designated places in Newfoundland and Labrador
- List of local service districts in Newfoundland and Labrador
- Royal eponyms in Canada
