= Burnt Point-Gull Island-Northern Bay, Newfoundland and Labrador =

Burnt Point-Gull Island-Northern Bay
- Local service district / designated place
- Location of Burnt Point-Gull Island-Northern Bay Burnt Point-Gull Island-Northern Bay (Canada)
- Coordinates: 47.949°N 53.07°W
- Country: Canada
- Province: Newfoundland and Labrador
- Region: Newfoundland
- Census division: 1
- Census subdivision: G

Government
  - Type: Unincorporated

Area
  - Land: 12.81 km^{2} (4.95 sq mi)

Population (2016)
  - Total: 546
- Time zone: UTC−03:30 (NST)
  - Summer (DST): UTC−02:30 (NDT)
- Area code: 709

Burnt Point-Gull Island-Northern Bay is a local service district and designated place in the Canadian province of Newfoundland and Labrador.

== Geography ==
Burnt Point-Gull Island-Northern Bay is in Newfoundland within Subdivision G of Division No. 1.

== Demographics ==
As a designated place in the 2016 Census of Population conducted by Statistics Canada, Burnt Point-Gull Island-Northern Bay recorded a population of 546 living in 255 of its 392 total private dwellings, a change of −13.5% from its 2011 population of 631. With a land area of 12.81 km^{2} (4.95 sq mi), it had a population density of 42.6/km^{2} (110.4/sq mi) in 2016.

== Government ==
Burnt Point-Gull Island-Northern Bay is a local service district (LSD) that is governed by a committee responsible for the provision of certain services to the community. The chair of the LSD committee is Joanne Doyle.

== See also ==
- List of communities in Newfoundland and Labrador
- List of designated places in Newfoundland and Labrador
- List of local service districts in Newfoundland and Labrador
