= Birchy Cove =

Local service district and designated place in Newfoundland and Labrador, Canada

Coordinates: 48.598°N 53.185°W

Location of Birchy Cove in Newfoundland and Labrador

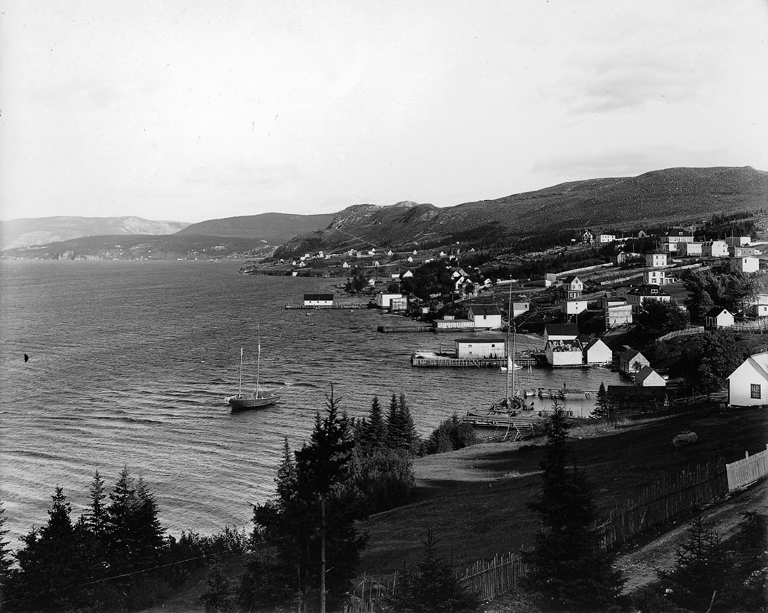
Birchy Cove, 1908

Birchy Cove is a local service district and designated place in the Canadian province of Newfoundland and Labrador.

It is located on the Bonavista Bay side of the Bonavista Peninsula, 2.5 km from Newman's Cove, and 8.4 km from the Town of Bonavista.

== Geography ==
Birchy Cove is in Newfoundland within Subdivision G of Division No. 7.

== Demographics ==
As a designated place in the 2016 Census of Population conducted by Statistics Canada, Birchy Cove recorded a population of 20 living in 13 of its 21 total private dwellings, a change of -33.3% from its 2011 population of 30. With a land area of 4 km^{2} (1.5 sq mi), it had a population density of 5.0/km^{2} (12.9/sq mi) in 2016.

== Government ==
Birchy Cove is a local service district (LSD) that is governed by a committee responsible for the provision of certain services to the community. The chair of the LSD committee is Reg Durdle.

== See also ==
- List of communities in Newfoundland and Labrador
- List of designated places in Newfoundland and Labrador
- List of local service districts in Newfoundland and Labrador
