= Pidgeon Cove-St. Barbe, Newfoundland and Labrador =

Pidgeon Cove-St. Barbe
- Local service district / designated place
- Location of Pidgeon Cove-St. Barbe Pidgeon Cove-St. Barbe (Canada)
- Coordinates: 51.196°N 56.781°W
- Country: Canada
- Province: Newfoundland and Labrador
- Region: Newfoundland
- Census division: 9
- Census subdivision: C

Government
  - Type: Unincorporated

Area
  - Land: 2.13 km^{2} (0.82 sq mi)

Population (2016)
  - Total: 135
- Time zone: UTC−03:30 (NST)
  - Summer (DST): UTC−02:30 (NDT)
- Area code: 709

Pidgeon Cove-St. Barbe is a local service district and designated place in the Canadian province of Newfoundland and Labrador.

== Geography ==
Pidgeon Cove-St. Barbe is in Newfoundland within Subdivision C of Division No. 9.

== Demographics ==
As a designated place in the 2016 Census of Population conducted by Statistics Canada, Pidgeon Cove-St. Barbe recorded a population of 135 living in 55 of its 60 total private dwellings, a change of −2.2% from its 2011 population of 138. With a land area of 2.13 km^{2} (0.82 sq mi), it had a population density of 63.4/km^{2} (164.2/sq mi) in 2016.

== Government ==
Pidgeon Cove-St. Barbe is a local service district (LSD) that is governed by a committee responsible for the provision of certain services to the community. The chair of the LSD committee is Bruce Tucker.

== See also ==
- List of communities in Newfoundland and Labrador
- List of designated places in Newfoundland and Labrador
- List of local service districts in Newfoundland and Labrador
