= Ocean Pond =

Ocean Pond may refer to:

- A nearly circular lake with a diameter of approximately two miles in Osceola National Forest, in Florida
  - Battle of Ocean Pond, or the Battle of Olustee, that took place near the pond
- A lake in Lake Park, Georgia
- Ocean Pond, Newfoundland and Labrador, a settlement near Mahers
