= Birchy =

Birchy may refer to:

- Birchy Bay, Newfoundland and Labrador
- Birchy Cove, settlement in Newfoundland and Labrador
- Birchy, alternate name of Birchville, California
