= Cape Ray, Newfoundland and Labrador =

Local service district and designated place in Canada

Coordinates: 47°38′16″N 59°17′07″W

Cape Ray is a local service district and designated place in the Canadian province of Newfoundland and Labrador. It is on the southwest coast of the island of Newfoundland.

== History ==
Cape Ray, the cape located near the community was the terminus for the overland portion of the transatlantic telegraph cable from St. John's to Cape Ray. From here the cable then takes a submarine route to Cape Breton Island. The area is also known for its discovery of Dorset Paleoeskimo artifacts. An archaeological site has been established in the area.

== Geography ==
Cape Ray is in Newfoundland within Subdivision H of Division No. 3. The community is located on the southwest coast just north of the town of Port aux Basques on Route 408. Nearby is the Cape from which the community draws its name. At the entrance to the harbour is a beach known for its 16 kilometer stretch of white sandy beach where the J.T. Cheeseman Provincial Park is located.

In the past, Cape Ray had been prospected for gold, as it was likely to have due to its resting on a fault line called "The Cape Ray Fault."

Surrounding the community are a large number of bodies of fresh water, and many hills, such as Table Mountain and the Twin Hills.

== Demographics ==
As a designated place in the 2016 Census of Population conducted by Statistics Canada, Cape Ray recorded a population of 352 living in 147 of its 166 total private dwellings, a change of -1.1% from its 2011 population of 356. With a land area of 21.32 km^{2} (8.23 sq mi), it had a population density of 16.5/km^{2} (42.8/sq mi) in 2016.

== Government ==
Cape Ray is a local service district (LSD) that is governed by a committee responsible for the provision of certain services to the community. The chair of the LSD committee is Anne Osmond.

== See also ==
- List of communities in Newfoundland and Labrador
- List of designated places in Newfoundland and Labrador
- List of local service districts in Newfoundland and Labrador
