= Nameless Cove, Newfoundland and Labrador =

Nameless Cove
- Local service district / designated place
- Location of Nameless Cove Nameless Cove (Canada)
- Coordinates: 51.313°N 56.728°W
- Country: Canada
- Province: Newfoundland and Labrador
- Region: Newfoundland
- Census division: 9
- Census subdivision: C

Government
  - Type: Unincorporated

Area
  - Land: 0.64 km^{2} (0.25 sq mi)

Population (2016)
  - Total: 69
- Time zone: UTC−03:30 (NST)
  - Summer (DST): UTC−02:30 (NDT)
- Area code: 709

Nameless Cove is a local service district and designated place in the Canadian province of Newfoundland and Labrador.

== Geography ==
Nameless Cove is in Newfoundland within Subdivision C of Division No. 9.

== Demographics ==
As a designated place in the 2016 Census of Population conducted by Statistics Canada, Nameless Cove recorded a population of 69 living in 26 of its 30 total private dwellings, a change of 0% from its 2011 population of 69. With a land area of 0.64 km^{2} (0.25 sq mi), it had a population density of 107.8/km^{2} (279.2/sq mi) in 2016.

== Government ==
Nameless Cove is a local service district (LSD) that is governed by a committee responsible for the provision of certain services to the community. The chair of the LSD committee is Shirley Burke.

== See also ==
- List of communities in Newfoundland and Labrador
- List of designated places in Newfoundland and Labrador
- List of local service districts in Newfoundland and Labrador
