= Jackson's Cove-Langdon's Cove-Silverdale, Newfoundland and Labrador =

Jackson's Cove-Langdon's Cove-Silverdale
- Local service district / designated place
- Location of Jackson's Cove-Langdon's Cove-Silverdale Jackson's Cove-Langdon's Cove-Silverdale (Canada)
- Coordinates: 49.675°N 56.012°W
- Country: Canada
- Province: Newfoundland and Labrador
- Region: Newfoundland
- Census division: 8
- Census subdivision: P

Government
  - Type: Unincorporated

Area
  - Land: 15.08 km^{2} (5.82 sq mi)

Population (2016)
  - Total: 129
- Time zone: UTC−03:30 (NST)
  - Summer (DST): UTC−02:30 (NDT)
- Area code: 709

Jackson's Cove-Langdon's Cove-Silverdale is a local service district and designated place in the Canadian province of Newfoundland and Labrador.

== Geography ==
Jackson's Cove-Langdon's Cove-Silverdale is in Newfoundland within Subdivision P of Division No. 8.

== History ==
Jackson's Cove was first listed in the 1857 Census with a population of 37; Langdon's Cove, grouped with Nicky's Nose, was first listed in 1874, with a population of 23; Silverdale (Bear Cove until 1921) was listed in 1891 with a population of 29.

The community of Jackson’s Cove was founded in the 1840s by English settlers engaged in lumbering, shipbuilding, fishing and subsistence farming. Starting in the mid 1800s, settlers also found employment in copper mines in nearby Burton’s Pond, Bett’s Cove, and Tilt Cove. Most of the early residents were followers of the Methodist faith, and had built a church as early as 1869.

== Demographics ==
As a designated place in the 2016 Census of Population conducted by Statistics Canada, Jackson's Cove-Langdon's Cove-Silverdale recorded a population of 129 living in 60 of its 105 total private dwellings, a change of −14% from its 2011 population of 150. With a land area of 15.08 km^{2} (5.82 sq mi), it had a population density of 8.6/km^{2} (22.2/sq mi) in 2016.

== Government ==
Jackson's Cove-Langdon's Cove-Silverdale is a local service district (LSD) that is governed by a committee responsible for the provision of certain services to the community. In 2022, the chair of the LSD committee was Antia Kelley.

== See also ==
- List of communities in Newfoundland and Labrador
- List of designated places in Newfoundland and Labrador
- List of local service districts in Newfoundland and Labrador
