= Ship Cove =

There are many small communities called Ship Cove; most are in Newfoundland.

- Ship Cove may refer to Botwood, Newfoundland and Labrador
- Ship Cove, a very small Cape Shore farming community on the southwestern Avalon Peninsula, Newfoundland and Labrador
- Ship Cove on Bell Island, Newfoundland and Labrador
- Ship Cove on the Great Northern Peninsula near Cape Onion, Newfoundland and Labrador
- Ship Cove, a community on the Port au Port Peninsula, Newfoundland and Labrador
- Ship Cove, New Zealand in the Marlborough Sounds of New Zealand
