= Green Island Brook =

- Local service district / designated place
- Location of Green Island Brook Green Island Brook (Canada)
- Coordinates: 51.396°N 56.529°W
- Country: Canada
- Province: Newfoundland and Labrador
- Region: Newfoundland
- Census division: 9
- Census subdivision: C

Government
  - Type: Unincorporated

Area
  - Land: 2.87 km^{2} (1.11 sq mi)

Population (2016)
  - Total: 143
- Time zone: UTC−03:30 (NST)
  - Summer (DST): UTC−02:30 (NDT)
- Area code: 709

Green Island Brook is a local service district and designated place in the Canadian province of Newfoundland and Labrador.

== Geography ==
Green Island Brook is in Newfoundland within Subdivision C of Division No. 9.

== Demographics ==
As a designated place in the 2016 Census of Population conducted by Statistics Canada, Green Island Brook recorded a population of 143 living in 69 of its 83 total private dwellings, a change of −11.2% from its 2011 population of 161. With a land area of 2.87 km^{2} (1.11 sq mi), it had a population density of 49.8/km^{2} (129.0/sq mi) in 2016.

== Government ==
Green Island Brook is a local service district (LSD) that is governed by a committee responsible for the provision of certain services to the community. The chair of the LSD committee is Donald Macey.

== See also ==
- List of communities in Newfoundland and Labrador
- List of designated places in Newfoundland and Labrador
- List of local service districts in Newfoundland and Labrador
