= Stanhope, Newfoundland and Labrador =

Human settlement in Newfoundland and Labrador, Canada

Coordinates: 49.272°N 55.087°W

Location of Stanhope in Newfoundland and Labrador

Stanhope is a local service district and designated place in the Canadian province of Newfoundland and Labrador.

== Geography ==
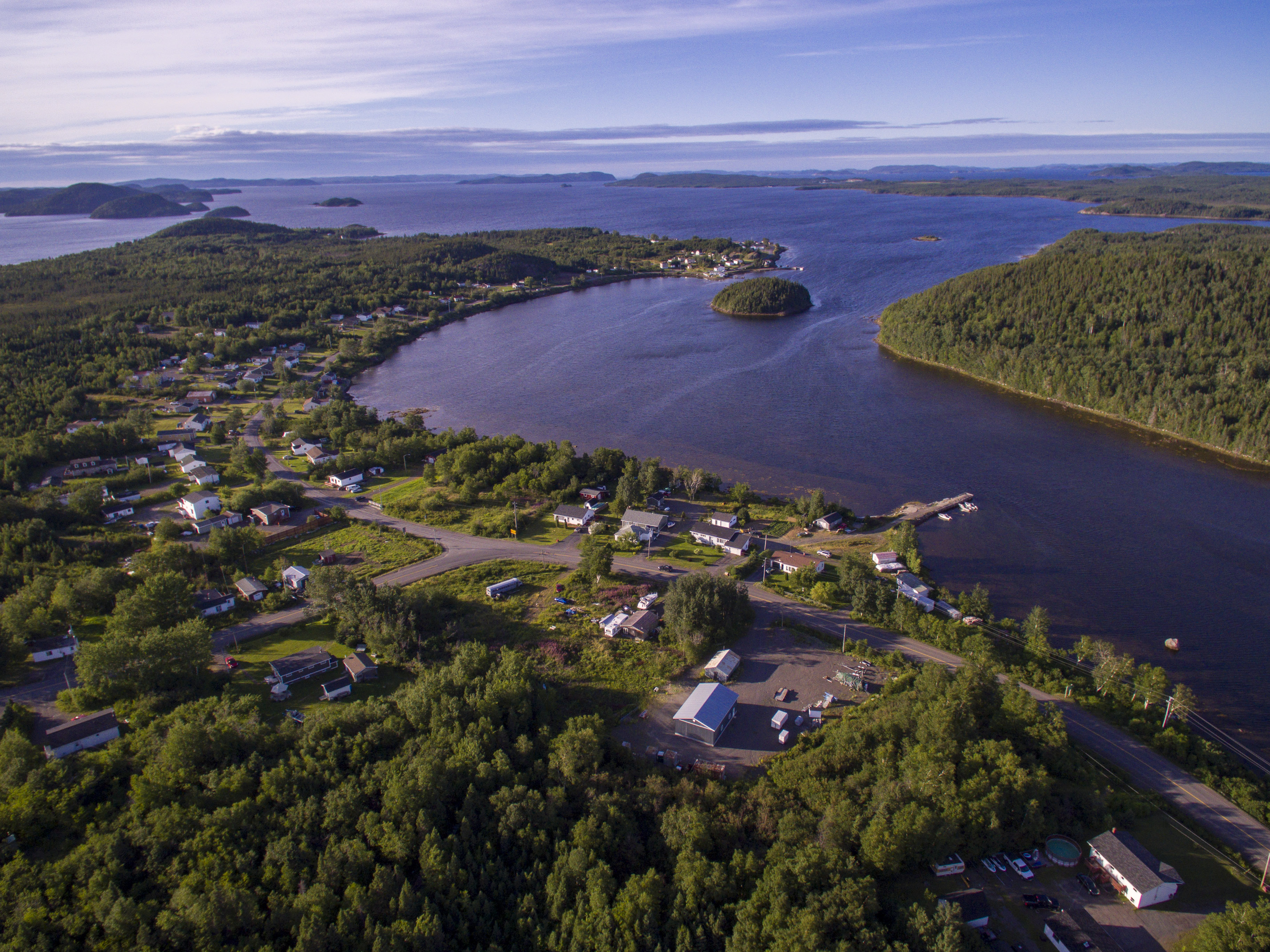
View of the community of Stanhope

Stanhope is in Newfoundland within Subdivision F of Division No. 8.

== Demographics ==
As a designated place in the 2021 Census of Population conducted by Statistics Canada, Stanhope recorded a population of 234 living in 123 of its 142 total private dwellings, a change of -17.2% from its 2011 population of 280. With a land area of 4.53 km^{2} (1.75 sq mi), it had a population density of 61.8/km^{2} (160.1/sq mi) in 2016.

== Government ==
Stanhope is a local service district (LSD) that is governed by a committee responsible for the provision of certain services to the community. The chair of the LSD committee is Harvey Pike.

== See also ==
- List of communities in Newfoundland and Labrador
- List of designated places in Newfoundland and Labrador
- List of local service districts in Newfoundland and Labrador
