= Deer Park/Vineland Road =

- Local service district
- Location of Deer Park/Vineland Road Deer Park/Vineland Road (Canada)
- Coordinates: 47.278°N 53.284°W
- Country: Canada
- Province: Newfoundland and Labrador
- Region: Newfoundland

Government
  - Type: Unincorporated
- Time zone: UTC−03:30 (NST)
  - Summer (DST): UTC−02:30 (NDT)
- Area code: 709
- Website: Official website

Deer Park/Vineland Road is a local service district in the Canadian province of Newfoundland and Labrador.

== Government ==
Deer Park/Vineland Road is a local service district (LSD) that is governed by a committee responsible for the provision of certain services to the community. The chair of the LSD committee is Dave Chaulk.

== See also ==
- List of communities in Newfoundland and Labrador
- List of local service districts in Newfoundland and Labrador
