= Ship Cove, Northern Peninsula, Newfoundland and Labrador =

Ship Cove
- Local service district / designated place
- Location of Ship Cove Ship Cove (Canada)
- Coordinates: 51.607°N 55.636°W
- Country: Canada
- Province: Newfoundland and Labrador
- Region: Newfoundland
- Census division: 9
- Census subdivision: D

Government
  - Type: Unincorporated

Area
  - Land: 2.66 km^{2} (1.03 sq mi)

Population (2016)
  - Total: 75
- Time zone: UTC−03:30 (NST)
  - Summer (DST): UTC−02:30 (NDT)
- Area code: 709

Ship Cove is a local service district and designated place in the Canadian province of Newfoundland and Labrador on the northern peninsula of the island of Newfoundland.

== Geography ==
Ship Cove is in Newfoundland within Subdivision D of Division No. 9.

== Demographics ==
As a designated place in the 2016 Census of Population conducted by Statistics Canada, Ship Cove recorded a population of 75 living in 39 of its 50 total private dwellings, a change of −14.8% from its 2011 population of 88. With a land area of 2.66 km^{2} (1.03 sq mi), it had a population density of 28.2/km^{2} (73.0/sq mi) in 2016.

== Government ==
Ship Cove, Northern Peninsula is a local service district (LSD) that is governed by a committee responsible for the provision of certain services to the community. The chair of the LSD committee is Vicki Hedderson.

== See also ==
- List of communities in Newfoundland and Labrador
- List of designated places in Newfoundland and Labrador
- List of local service districts in Newfoundland and Labrador
