= Quirpon =

Local service district in Newfoundland and Labrador, Canada

Coordinates: 51°34′50″N 55°27′20″W

Quirpon is a local service district in the Canadian province of Newfoundland and Labrador. It is on the northern tip of the Great Northern Peninsula of the island of Newfoundland. It is the most northerly sheltered harbour on the island. This area was historically called "Ikkereitsock" by the Inuit.

Historically a fishing village, its role in the fishery has declined since the northern cod moratorium of 1992.

Quirpon is a designated place in Canadian census data. Published statistics for the Quirpon DPL, which had a population of 180 in the 2021 Canadian Census, also include the nearby village of Straitsview and the historical site at L'Anse aux Meadows.

== Geography ==
Quirpon is in Newfoundland within Subdivision D of Division No. 9.

== Government ==
Quirpon is a local service district (LSD) that is governed by a committee responsible for the provision of certain services to the community.

== See also ==
- List of communities in Newfoundland and Labrador
- List of local service districts in Newfoundland and Labrador
- Newfoundland and Labrador Route 430
