= Portland Creek, Newfoundland and Labrador =

Local service district in Canada

Coordinates: 50.159°N 57.617°W

Location of Portland Creek in Newfoundland and Labrador

Portland Creek is a local service district and designated place in the Canadian province of Newfoundland and Labrador.

== Geography ==
Portland Creek is in Newfoundland within Subdivision H of Division No. 9.

== Demographics ==
As a designated place in the 2016 Census of Population conducted by Statistics Canada, Portland Creek recorded a population of 77 living in 37 of its 52 total private dwellings, a change of -8.3% from its 2011 population of 84. With a land area of 10.73 km^{2} (4.14 sq mi), it had a population density of 7.2/km^{2} (18.6/sq mi) in 2016.

== Government ==
Portland Creek is a local service district (LSD) that is governed by a committee responsible for the provision of certain services to the community. The chair of the LSD committee is Douglas Collett.

== See also ==
- List of communities in Newfoundland and Labrador
- List of designated places in Newfoundland and Labrador
- List of local service districts in Newfoundland and Labrador
