= Hay Cove, Newfoundland and Labrador =

Hay Cove
- Local service district
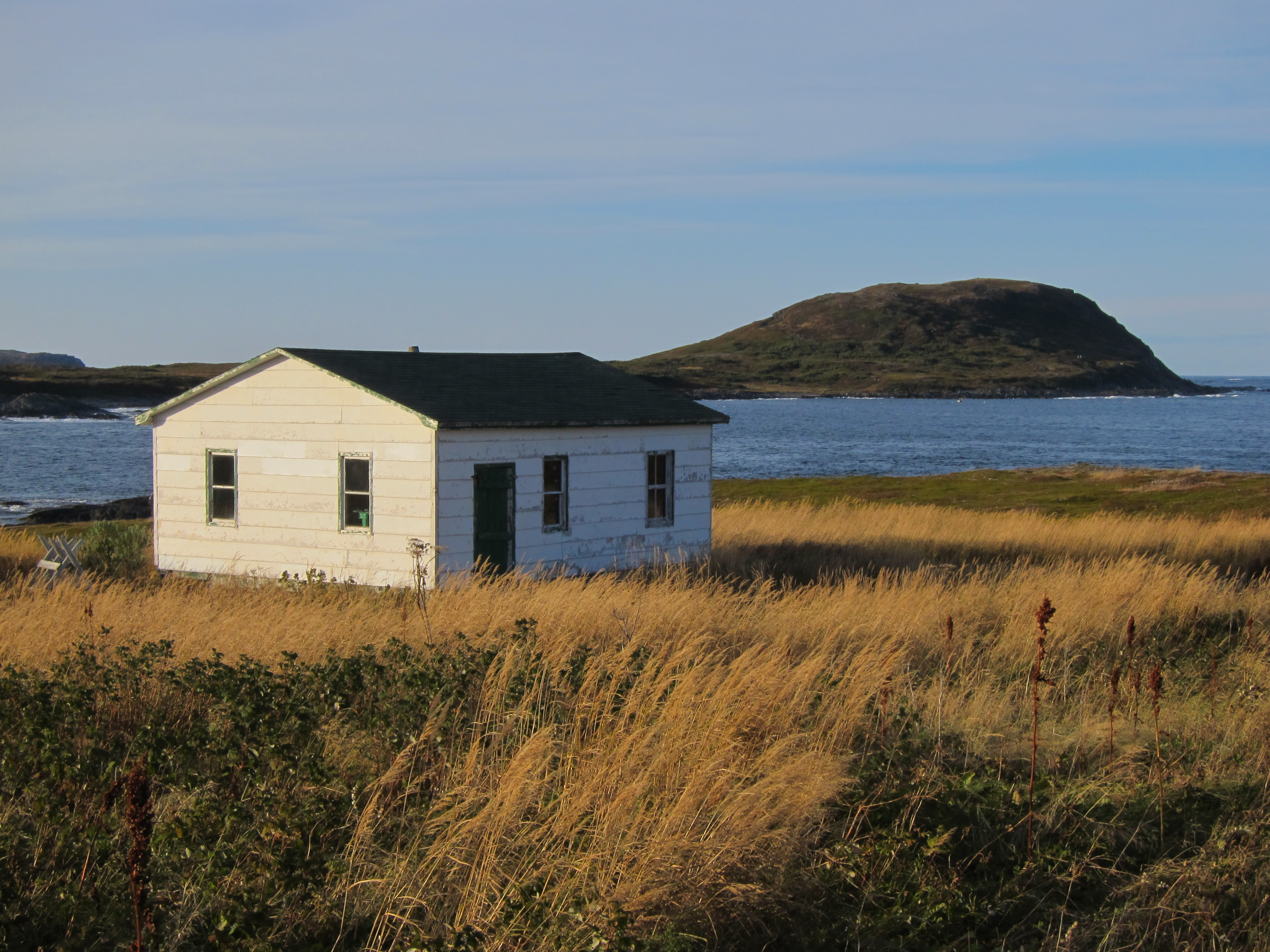
- A building in Hay Cove

- Location of Hay Cove Hay Cove (Canada)
- Coordinates: 51.590°N 55.492°W
- Country: Canada
- Province: Newfoundland and Labrador
- Region: Newfoundland
- Census division: 9
- Census subdivision: D

Government
  - Type: Unincorporated
- Time zone: UTC−03:30 (NST)
  - Summer (DST): UTC−02:30 (NDT)
- Area code: 709

Hay Cove is a local service district in the Canadian province of Newfoundland and Labrador.

== Geography ==
Hay Cove is in Newfoundland within Subdivision D of Division No. 9.

== Government ==
Hay Cove is a local service district (LSD) that is governed by a committee responsible for the provision of certain services to the community. The chair of the LSD committee is Marie Eddison.

== See also ==
- List of communities in Newfoundland and Labrador
- List of local service districts in Newfoundland and Labrador
