= Division No. 6, Newfoundland and Labrador =

Census division in Canada

Division No. 6
- Census division
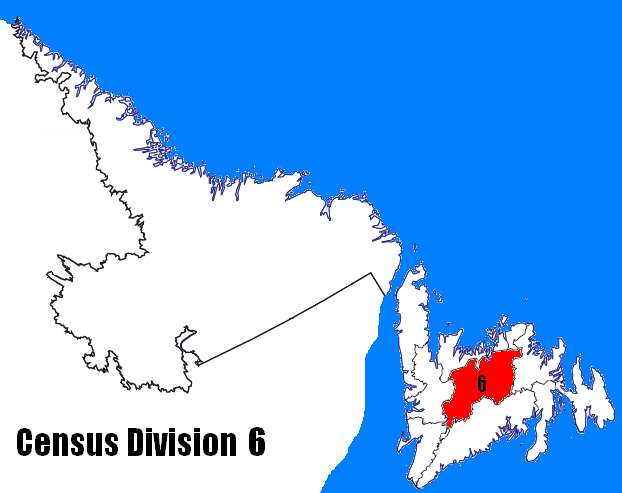
- Coordinates: 49°00′N 56°00′W
- Country: Canada
- Province: Newfoundland and Labrador

Area
  - Total: 16,238.16 km^{2} (6,269.59 sq mi)
- As of 2016

Population (2016)
  - Total: 38,345
  - Density: 2.3614/km^{2} (6.1160/sq mi)

Division No. 6 is a census division in the central part of the island of Newfoundland in the province of Newfoundland and Labrador, Canada. It is divided into 16 parts; 12 towns and four unorganized subdivisions.

The division had a population of 38,345 in the Canada 2016 Census.

== Towns ==
- Appleton
- Badger
- Bishop's Falls
- Botwood
- Buchans
- Gander
- Glenwood
- Grand Falls-Windsor
- Millertown
- Norris Arm
- Northern Arm
- Peterview

== Unorganized subdivisions ==
- Subdivision A
- Subdivision C
- Subdivision D
- Subdivision E

== Demographics ==
Historical populations Division No. 6, NL
Year	Pop.	±%
1951	27,968	—
1961	38,045	+36.0%
1971	40,085	+5.4%
1976	42,850	+6.9%
1981	42,008	−2.0%
1986	40,714	−3.1%
1991	40,236	−1.2%
1996	39,118	−2.8%
2001	36,208	−7.4%
2006	36,208	+0.0%
2011	37,304	+3.0%
2016	38,345	+2.8%
2021	37,339	−2.6%

In the 2021 Census of Population conducted by Statistics Canada, Division No. 6 had a population of 37,339 living in 16,489 of its 19,498 total private dwellings, a change of −2.6% from its 2016 population of 38,345. With a land area of 16,043.38 km^{2} (6,194.38 sq mi), it had a population density of 2.3/km^{2} (6.0/sq mi) in 2021.

== Sources ==
- "Division No. 6, Newfoundland and Labrador (Code 1006) Census Profile". 2011 census. Government of Canada - Statistics Canada.
