= Noddy Bay =

Local service district in Newfoundland and Labrador, Canada

Coordinates: 51.578°N 55.479°W

Location of Noddy Bay in Newfoundland and Labrador

Noddy Bay is a local service district in the Canadian province of Newfoundland and Labrador. It is on the Great Northern Peninsula of the island of Newfoundland. It has a population of 60 people.

== Geography ==
Noddy Bay is in Newfoundland within Subdivision P of Division No. 8.

== Government ==
Noddy Bay is a local service district (LSD) that is governed by a committee responsible for the provision of certain services to the community. The chair of the LSD committee is Carl Hedderson.

== See also ==
- List of local service districts in Newfoundland and Labrador
