= Division No. 1, Subdivision H, Newfoundland and Labrador =

Subdivision 1H
- Unorganized territory
- Division No. 1, Subdivision H
- Location within Newfoundland
- Country: Canada
- Province: Newfoundland and Labrador
- Census division: Division 1

Government
  - MHA: Riley Balsom (PC, Carbonear-Trinity-Bay de Verde)
  - MP: Jonathan Rowe (CON, Terra Nova-The Peninsulas)

Area
  - Land: 56.85 km^{2} (21.95 sq mi)

Population (2016)
  - Total: 390
  - Density: 6.9/km^{2} (18/sq mi)
- Time zone: UTC-3:30 (Newfoundland Time)
  - Summer (DST): UTC-2:30 (Newfoundland Daylight)

Division No. 1, Subdivision H is an unorganized subdivision on the Avalon Peninsula in Newfoundland and Labrador, Canada. It is in Division 1 and contains the unincorporated communities of Clowns Cove, Flatrock, Freshwater, Halfway House, Perry's Cove and Spout Cove.

== Flatrock (Conception Bay) ==
47.759899°N 53.1789739°W Flatrock is an abandoned community in Conception Bay, Newfoundland and Labrador.

It is located about 5km northeast of Carbonear.

== Perry's Cove ==
47°48′N 53°09′W Perry's Cove is a community in Newfoundland, Canada, located about 125 kilometers from St. John's and is situated on the North Shore of Conception Bay, which is on the easternmost part of the province known as the Avalon Peninsula. This community has historically been a part of the Carbonear electoral district during provincial elections, because of its proximity to the much larger center for commerce and medical services located in Carbonear, only 10 kilometers away. The big social event of Perry's Cove is Perry's Cove Days, usually a whole weekend of activities for young and old, held during mid-summer. This is well attended by locals and the many who return home for their summer holidays.

The village currently has a population of roughly 120. The most common names in the community are King, Swain, Kelloway, Butt, Reynolds, and Budden.
