= Division No. 1, Subdivision M, Newfoundland and Labrador =

Subdivision 1M
- Unorganized territory
- Division No. 1, Subdivision M
- Country: Canada
- Province: Newfoundland and Labrador
- Census division: Division 1

Government
  - MHA: Pam Parsons (LIB, Harbour Grace-Port de Grave)
  - MP: Paul Connors (LIB, Avalon)

Area
  - Land: 139.95 km^{2} (54.03 sq mi)

Population (2016)
  - Total: 1,073
  - Density: 7.7/km^{2} (20/sq mi)
- Time zone: UTC-3:30 (Newfoundland Time)
  - Summer (DST): UTC-2:30 (Newfoundland Daylight)

Division No. 1, Subdivision M is an unorganized subdivision on the Avalon Peninsula in Newfoundland and Labrador, Canada in Division 1. It contains the unincorporated communities of Emerald Vale, Goulds Road, Juniper Stump, Mahers and Turks Water. At several times in the past, census enumerating officers have considered Emerald Vale, Turks Water and Juniper Stump - along with other names such as Riverside Mills - to be part of the loosely defined Makinsons/Hodgewater settlement.

== Goulds Road ==
47°29′00″N 53°18′57″W Goulds Road was a village located south of Bay Roberts. It had a population of 139 in 1956.

== Mahers ==
47.402°N 53.364°W Mahers is a settlement in Newfoundland and Labrador that has undergone a recent resurgence after nearly being abandoned after the railway was closed down on the Island. Both Mahers and the nearby Ocean Pond settlement have sizable numbers of summer homes, as do several other locations in the area.
