= Straitsview =

Local service district in Newfoundland and Labrador, Canada

Coordinates: 51.591°N 55.490°W

Location of Straitsview in Newfoundland and Labrador

Straitsview is a local service district in the Canadian province of Newfoundland and Labrador.

== Geography ==
Straitsview is in Newfoundland within Subdivision D of Division No. 9.

== Government ==
Straitsview is a local service district (LSD) that is governed by a committee responsible for the provision of certain services to the community. The chair of the LSD committee is Ford Blake.

== See also ==
- List of local service districts in Newfoundland and Labrador
