= Division No. 3, Newfoundland and Labrador =

Census division in Canada

Division No. 3
- Census division
- Interactive map of Division No. 3
- Coordinates: 47°31′20″N 55°24′39″W
- Country: Canada
- Province: Newfoundland and Labrador

Area
  - Total: 19,912.67 km^{2} (7,688.32 sq mi)
- As of 2016

Population (2021)
  - Total: 13,920
  - Density: 0.6991/km^{2} (1.811/sq mi)

Division No. 3, Newfoundland and Labrador is a census division in the Canadian province of Newfoundland and Labrador, primarily comprising the South Coast of the island of Newfoundland, starting roughly 10km northwest of Channel-Port aux Basques and ending roughly 10km east of Rencontre East. Like all census divisions in Newfoundland and Labrador, but unlike the census divisions of some other provinces, the division exists only as a statistical division for census data, and is not a political entity.

In the Canada 2021 Census, the division had a population of 13,920 (down from 15,560 in 2016) and a land area of 19,912.67 square kilometres.

== Towns ==
- Belleoram
- Burgeo
- Burnt Islands
- Channel-Port aux Basques
- Gaultois
- Harbour Breton
- Hermitage-Sandyville
- Isle aux Morts
- Margaree
- Milltown-Head of Bay d'Espoir
- Morrisville
- Pool's Cove
- Ramea
- Rencontre East
- Rose Blanche-Harbour le Cou
- Seal Cove
- St. Alban's
- St. Jacques-Coomb's Cove

== Unorganized subdivisions ==
- Subdivision A
- Subdivision B
- Subdivision C
- Subdivision D
- Subdivision E
- Subdivision F
- Subdivision H
- Subdivision I
- Subdivision J

== First Nations reserves ==
- Samiajij Miawpukek

== Demographics ==
Historical populations Division No. 3, NL
Year	Pop.	±%
1951	20,434	—
1961	23,299	+14.0%
1971	24,515	+5.2%
1976	25,835	+5.4%
1981	26,209	+1.4%
1986	25,737	−1.8%
1991	24,236	−5.8%
1996	22,459	−7.3%
2001	19,370	−13.8%
2006	17,686	−8.7%
2011	16,306	−7.8%
2016	15,560	−4.6%
2021	13,920	−10.5%

In the 2021 Census of Population conducted by Statistics Canada, Division No. 3 had a population of 13,920 living in 6,342 of its 8,046 total private dwellings, a change of −10.5% from its 2016 population of 15,560. With a land area of 19,272.11 km^{2} (7,441.00 sq mi), it had a population density of 0.7/km^{2} (1.9/sq mi) in 2021.

== See also ==
- List of communities in Newfoundland and Labrador
