= Census division =

Official census terminology used in the United States and Canada

Census divisions, in Canada and the United States, are areas delineated for the purposes of statistical analysis and presentation; they have no government in and of themselves. The census divisions of Canada are second-level census geographic unit, below provinces and territories, and above "census subdivisions" and "dissemination areas". In provinces where they exist, the census division may correspond to a county, a regional municipality or a regional district.

In the United States, the Census Bureau divides the country into four census regions and nine census divisions. The bureau also divides counties (or county equivalents) into either census county divisions or minor civil division, depending on the state.

== See also ==
- Census geographic units of Canada
- Statistics Canada
- United States Census Bureau census regions and divisions
