= Division No. 1, Subdivision A, Newfoundland and Labrador =

Division No. 1, Subdivision A
- Subdivision of unorganized area
- Division No. 1, Subd. A
- Location within Newfoundland
- Country: Canada
- Province: Newfoundland and Labrador
- Census division: Division No. 1

Area
  - Land: 779.54 km^{2} (300.98 sq mi)

Population (2016)
  - Total: 731
  - Density: 0.9/km^{2} (2.3/sq mi)
- Time zone: UTC-3:30 (Newfoundland Time)
  - Summer (DST): UTC-2:30 (Newfoundland Daylight)

Division No. 1, Subdivision A is an unorganized subdivision on the Avalon Peninsula in Newfoundland and Labrador, Canada. It is in Division No. 1, and lies between Trinity Bay and Placentia Bay.

It contains the unincorporated communities of Arnold's Cove Station, Bellevue, Fair Haven, Goobies, Little Harbour East, Rantem, Thornlea and Trinny Cove.

== Arnold's Cove Station ==
47.7845°N 53.9696°W Arnold's Cove Station is a tiny rural community located on Newfoundland's Avalon Peninsula in the province of Newfoundland and Labrador, Canada

It is situated approximately two kilometers from the town of Arnold's Cove, from which it derived its name.

The community was established in the 1890s when Robert Gillespie Reid's Newfoundland Railway was constructed through the area, bypassing Arnold's Cove proper.

Most of the settlers worked for the Reid Newfoundland Railway and in later years the Canadian National Railway.

Members of the United States Army were stationed in the community during World War II.

== Bellevue ==
47°38′N 53°45′W Bellevue is a small community located in Trinity Bay, Newfoundland and Labrador. It was known as Tickle Harbour and appeared on early French maps of Trinity Bay. It is unknown exactly when the community was first settled, but a Thomas Lynch was recorded at Tickle Harbour in 1817, and Benjamin Lester, a merchant of Trinity had business operations there in the 1700s. The community name was changed to Bellevue on December 11, 1896. It has a population of about 200 people, 415 including the communities of Thornlea and Bellevue Beach. It has two stores, one of which is a gas bar. The gas bar (Connie's) has cabins for rent on the side, and is close to a community playground. The wharf once hosted many fishing boats but the local fishermen, for the most part, now dock at the larger wharf in nearby Long Cove. This is convenient because there is a fish plant there. Bellevue is about 110 kilometres (sixty-eight miles) away from St. John's.

In 1911 it had two stores and a church. The first Postmistress was Margaret Lynch in 1894. It had a population of 140 in 1911 and 285 in 1956. Local legend says that Bellevue got its name from a local priest by the name of Father Browne. He travelled to Tickle Harbour on foot from the railway station at Tickle Harbour crossing. When viewing the community on his way down the hill from what is now the transcanada, he renamed the community Bellevue, meaning; beautiful sight or view. The path down the hill to broad lake was always called Father Browne's road by the older people. Folklore says that at the same time that he renamed the community, he blessed a small brook that he drank from, which was also referred to by the older folk as the blessed brook or Father Brown's well.

Bellevue is approximately a ten-minute drive from the neighbouring community of Bellevue Beach (mentioned above). In the years following World War Two, Augustus Whitten (Gus) of St. John's became interested in the area, originally intending to have quiet land for a cottage. Mr Whitten saw business potential as the former highway was paved and passed directly through the area. He sold his store on the South side of St. John's and moved to 'Bellevue Beach,' where he started a local restaurant. As time passed, more families moved to the area and the community gained and lost two stores, a hairdressing shop, built a business of cabins- Fiddler's Green- which is still standing today, and is home to a previously provincial campground. The original restaurant has since also become a club as well as a gas bar and is now being renovated into rooms for rent.

== Fair Haven ==
47°32′00″N 53°54′00″W Fair Haven is a village located southeast of Swift Current. It had a population of 112 in 1951, but the population has been in steady decline since the closure of the fishery in 1993. Fair Haven had 85 people as of the 2011 Canadian Census. The town was known as Famish Gut until the early 1900s.

== Goobies ==
47°56′00″N 53°57′57″W Goobies is a village located northeast of Swift Current. It had a population of 98 in 1956, however its population has grown to 194 according to 2007 census estimate. Its main feature is a large statue of a moose at the ubiquitously province-known Irving gas station just outside the main part of the village. Goobies is an unincorporated community. It is mostly known as a rest stop along the Trans-Canada Highway, with a selection of gas stations and places to eat. Route 210 descends from Goobies down the Burin Peninsula.

== Rantem ==
47°41′N 53°53′W Rantem was a small settlement located south east of Swift Current, Newfoundland and Labrador.

== Thornlea ==
47°36′35″N 53°43′07″W Thornlea is a village located west of Bay Roberts in the province of Newfoundland and Labrador, Canada. The population was 99 in 1951; 140 in 1956.

== Trinny Cove ==
47°29′N 53°55′W Trinny Cove was a settlement located North-west of Long Harbour in Newfoundland and Labrador, Canada.

Trinny Cove was first shown in a 1706 French map of Placentia Bay, it was then named Tinny Cove. It was settled in the early 1800s with the 1835 census showing 12 people living in the community. A Rev. Wix visited the area around this time, mistakenly calling it Tilley Cove. Rev. Wix visited from Great Placentia on a punt of Joseph Dicks', son of Christopher Dicks, a planter, who lived there at the time. At this time many settlers had winter houses in "The Bottom" at Long Harbour. By 1845 the population had grown to its height of 32 people. By 1884 the population had dropped to a low of 6 people. At the start of the 20th Century in 1921 the population had again grown to 23 people in 4 households. The two family names of the community at the time were Thorne and Crann. By 1935 the community had been abandoned, with most people moving to nearby Long Harbour.
