= Division No. 7, Newfoundland and Labrador =

Census division in Canada

Division No. 7
- Census division
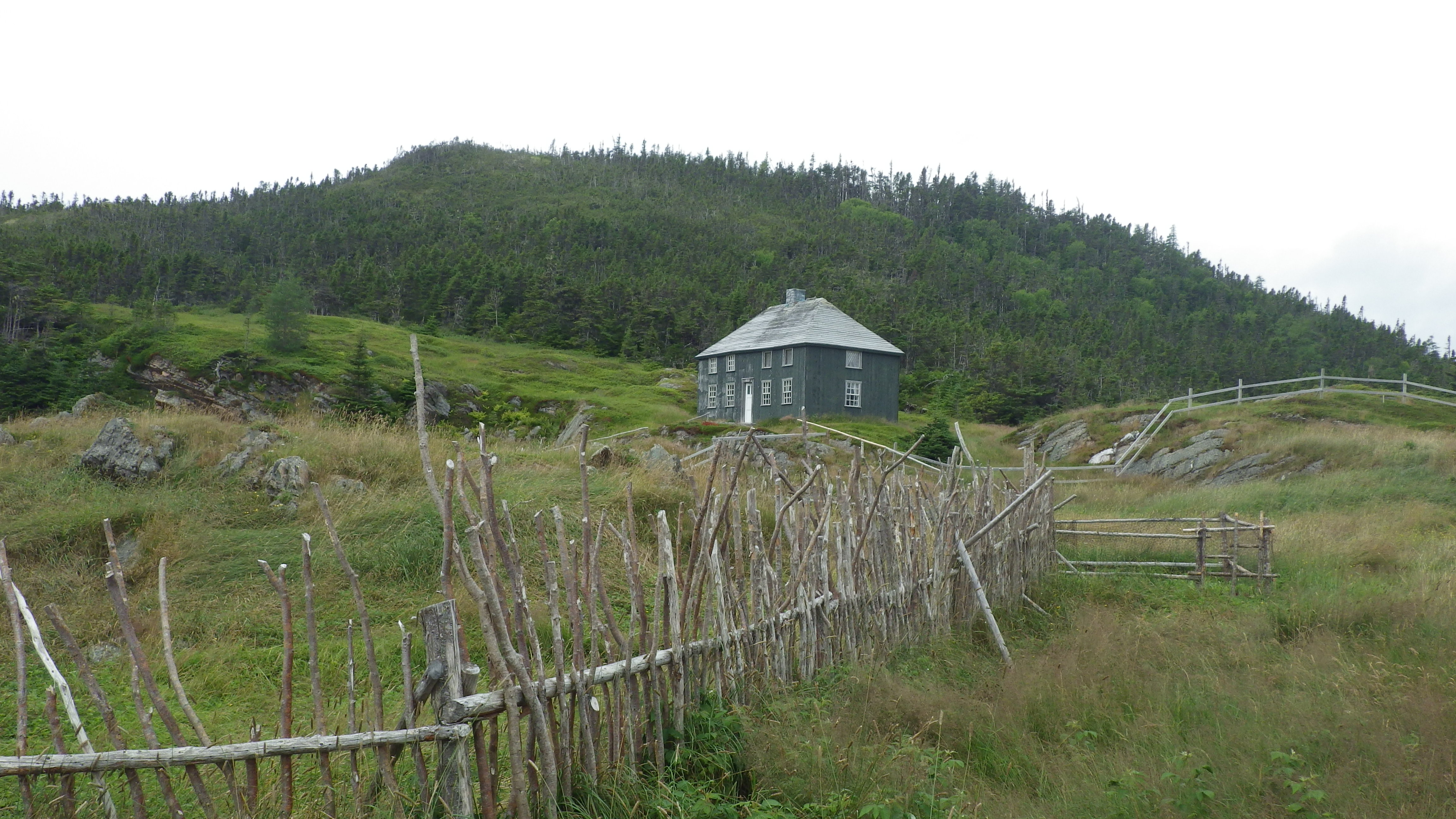

- Coordinates: 48°38′02″N 53°02′27″W
- Country: Canada
- Province: Newfoundland and Labrador

Area
  - Total: 9,672.91 km^{2} (3,734.73 sq mi)
- As of 2021

Population (2021)
  - Total: 33,044
  - Density: 3.4161/km^{2} (8.8478/sq mi)

Division No. 7, Newfoundland and Labrador is a census division in the Canadian province of Newfoundland and Labrador, primarily comprising the Bonavista Bay region. Like all census divisions in Newfoundland and Labrador, but unlike the census divisions of some other provinces, the division exists only as a statistical division for census data, and is not a political entity.

In the Canada 2016 Census, the division had a population of 34,092 and a land area of 9,672.91 square kilometres.

== Towns ==
- Bonavista
- Centreville-Wareham-Trinity
- Clarenville
- Dover
- Duntara
- Eastport
- Elliston
- Gambo
- Glovertown
- Greenspond
- Happy Adventure
- Hare Bay
- Indian Bay
- Keels
- King's Cove
- Musgravetown
- New-Wes-Valley
- Port Blandford
- Port Rexton
- Salvage
- Sandringham
- Sandy Cove
- St. Brendan's
- Terra Nova
- Traytown
- Trinity
- Trinity Bay North

== Unorganized subdivisions ==
- Subdivision A
- Subdivision B
- Subdivision D
- Subdivision E
- Subdivision F
- Subdivision G
- Subdivision I
- Subdivision J
- Subdivision K
- Subdivision L
- Subdivision M
- Subdivision N

== Demographics ==
Historical populations Division No. 7, NL
Year	Pop.	±%
1951	35,294	—
1956	38,209	+8.3%
1961	39,652	+3.8%
1966	39,318	−0.8%
1971	40,575	+3.2%
1976	43,325	+6.8%
1981	43,438	+0.3%
1986	43,618	+0.4%
1991	43,170	−1.0%
1996	41,534	−3.8%
2001	37,335	−10.1%
2006	35,501	−4.9%
2011	34,686	−2.3%
2016	34,092	−1.7%
2021	33,044	−3.1%

In the 2021 Census of Population conducted by Statistics Canada, Division No. 7 had a population of 33,044 living in 14,867 of its 20,304 total private dwellings, a change of −3.1% from its 2016 population of 34,092. With a land area of 9,598.37 km^{2} (3,705.95 sq mi), it had a population density of 3.4/km^{2} (8.9/sq mi) in 2021.

== See also ==
- List of communities in Newfoundland and Labrador
