= Division No. 4, Newfoundland and Labrador =

Census division in Canada

Division No. 4
- Census division
- Interactive map of Division No. 4
- Coordinates: 48°33′00″N 58°34′27″W
- Country: Canada
- Province: Newfoundland and Labrador

Area
  - Total: 7,087.65 km^{2} (2,736.56 sq mi)
- As of 2016

Population (2016)
  - Total: 20,387
  - Density: 2.8764/km^{2} (7.4499/sq mi)

Census Division No. 4 is a Statistics Canada statistical division that comprises the areas of the province of Newfoundland and Labrador called St. George's. It covers a land area of 7087.65 km² and had a population of 20,387 at the 2016 census.

== Towns ==
- Cape St. George
- Gallants
- Kippens
- Lourdes
- Port au Port East
- Port au Port West-Aguathuna-Felix Cove
- St. George's
- Stephenville
- Stephenville Crossing

== Unorganized subdivisions ==
- Subdivision A (including Codroy, Cape Anguille, Doyles, South Branch)
- Subdivision B (including Highlands, Jeffrey’s, Robinsons)
- Subdivision C (including St. Teresa, Flat Bay, Barachois Brook)
- Subdivision D (including Fox Island River)
- Subdivision E (including Mainland)

== Demographics ==
Historical populations Division No. 4, NL
Year	Pop.	±%
1951	15,982	—
1961	24,185	+51.3%
1971	28,350	+17.2%
1976	30,185	+6.5%
1981	27,749	−8.1%
1986	27,278	−1.7%
1991	25,691	−5.8%
1996	24,824	−3.4%
2001	22,162	−10.7%
2006	21,168	−4.5%
2011	20,840	−1.5%
2016	20,387	−2.2%
2021	19,253	−5.6%

In the 2021 Census of Population conducted by Statistics Canada, Division No. 4 had a population of 19,253 living in 9,196 of its 10,900 total private dwellings, a change of −5.6% from its 2016 population of 20,387. With a land area of 7,019.97 km^{2} (2,710.43 sq mi), it had a population density of 2.7/km^{2} (7.1/sq mi) in 2021.

== Sources ==
- "Division No. 4, Newfoundland and Labrador (Code 1004) Census Profile". 2011 census. Government of Canada - Statistics Canada.
