= Division No. 1, Newfoundland and Labrador =

Census division in Canada

Division 1
- Census division
- Division No. 1
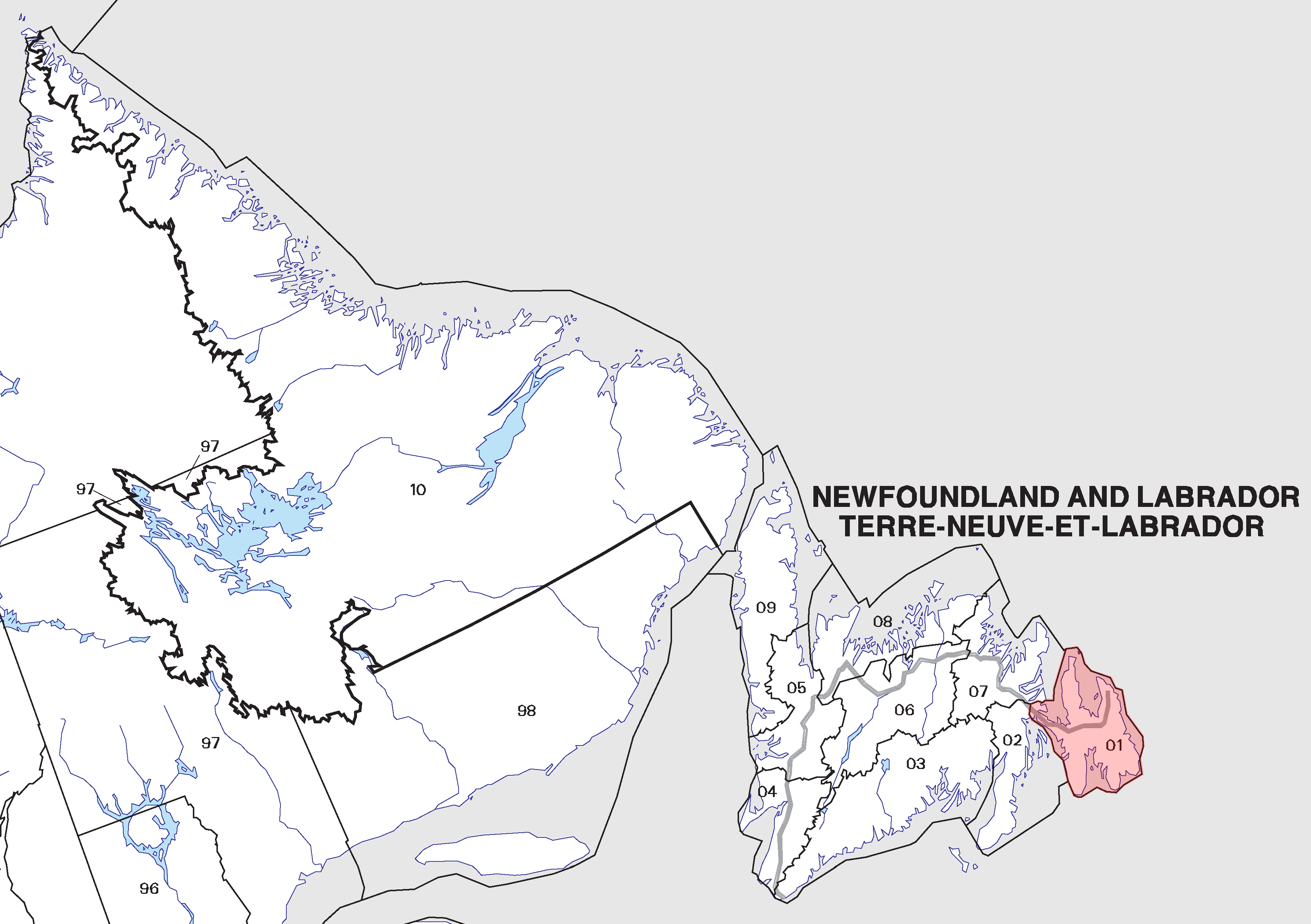
- Coordinates: 47°33′N 52°42′W
- Country: Canada
- Province: Newfoundland and Labrador

Government
  - MPs: Jonathan Rowe, Paul Connors, Tom Osborne and Joanne Thompson

Area
  - Total: 9,220.61 km^{2} (3,560.10 sq mi)
- As of 2016

Population (2016)
  - Total: 270,348
  - Density: 29.3200/km^{2} (75.9384/sq mi)

Division 1, Newfoundland and Labrador is a census division covering the entire Avalon Peninsula including the Isthmus of Avalon of the Canadian province of Newfoundland and Labrador. Like all census divisions in Newfoundland and Labrador, but unlike the census divisions of some other provinces, the division exists only as a statistical division for census data, and is not a political entity.

The area has the largest population of the province, totaling 270,348 – 52% of the provincial total – in 2016. The total land area is 9,220.61 square kilometres. The coast of the Avalon Peninsula is characterized by four main bays and a number of smaller bays. The four main bays are; Trinity Bay, Conception Bay, St. Mary's Bay and Placentia Bay. The largest bay is Placentia Bay.

St. John's, the capital of the province, is located in this division along with the second largest of the three cities of the province, Mount Pearl. The majority of the towns and villages are located along the coast in much of the four main bays as mentioned.

== Communities ==
=== Cities ===
- Mount Pearl
- St. John's

=== Towns ===
- Admirals Beach
- Aquaforte
- Arnold's Cove
- Avondale
- Bauline
- Bay Bulls
- Bay Roberts
- Bay de Verde
- Bishop's Cove
- Branch
- Brigus
- Bryant's Cove
- Cape Broyle
- Carbonear
- Chance Cove
- Chapel Arm
- Clarke's Beach
- Colinet
- Colliers
- Come By Chance
- Conception Bay South
- Conception Harbour
- Cupids
- Fermeuse
- Ferryland
- Flatrock
- Fox Harbour
- Gaskiers
- Hant's Harbour
- Harbour Grace
- Harbour Main-Chapel's Cove-Lakeview
- Heart's Content
- Heart's Delight-Islington
- Heart's Desire
- Holyrood
- Logy Bay-Middle Cove-Outer Cove
- Long Harbour-Mount Arlington Heights
- Mount Carmel-Mitchells Brook-St. Catherines
- New Perlican
- Norman's Cove-Long Cove
- North River
- Old Perlican
- Paradise
- Petty Harbour-Maddox Cove
- Placentia
- Point Lance
- Port Kirwan
- Portugal Cove South
- Portugal Cove-St. Philip's
- Pouch Cove
- Renews-Cappahayden
- Riverhead
- Salmon Cove
- Small Point-Adam's Cove-Blackhead-Broad Cove
- South River
- Southern Harbour
- Spaniard's Bay
- St. Bride's
- St. Joseph's
- St. Mary's
- St. Shott's
- St. Vincent's-St. Stephen's-Peter's River
- Sunnyside
- Torbay
- Trepassey
- Upper Island Cove
- Victoria
- Wabana
- Whitbourne
- Whiteway
- Winterton
- Witless Bay

=== Unorganized subdivisions ===
- Subdivision A
- Subdivision B
- Subdivision C
- Subdivision D
- Subdivision E
- Subdivision F
- Subdivision G
- Subdivision H
- Subdivision I
- Subdivision J
- Subdivision K
- Subdivision L
- Subdivision M
- Subdivision N
- Subdivision O
- Subdivision R
- Subdivision U
- Subdivision V
- Subdivision W
- Subdivision X
- Subdivision Y

== Demographics ==
Historical populations Division No. 1, NL
Year	Pop.	±%
1951	149,543	—
1961	188,904	+26.3%
1971	214,380	+13.5%
1976	228,365	+6.5%
1981	239,410	+4.8%
1986	246,149	+2.8%
1991	253,203	+2.9%
1996	251,523	−0.7%
2001	242,875	−3.4%
2006	248,418	+2.3%
2011	262,410	+5.6%
2016	270,348	+3.0%
2021	271,878	+0.6%

In the 2021 Census of Population conducted by Statistics Canada, Division No. 1 had a population of 271,878 living in 117,178 of its 135,137 total private dwellings, a change of 0.6% from its 2016 population of 270,348. With a land area of 9,104.58 km^{2} (3,515.30 sq mi), it had a population density of 29.9/km^{2} (77.3/sq mi) in 2021.

Top Ten Ethnic Origins for the Population in Division No. 1, Newfoundland and Labrador (Canada 2016 Census)
Ethnic Origin	Percentage of Population
Canadian	51.8%
English	38.0%
Irish	28.4%
Scottish	7.6%
French	4.2%
First Nations (North American Indian)	3.5%
German	2.1%
British Isles origins, not included elsewhere	1.5%
Welsh	1.2%
Newfoundlander	1.0%
Métis	0.8%

== See also ==
- List of communities in Newfoundland and Labrador
