= List of unorganized subdivisions in Newfoundland and Labrador =

The Canadian province of Newfoundland and Labrador is divided into 11 census divisions. The unincorporated portions of these 11 census divisions are divided into 92 unorganized subdivisions for Canadian census statistical purposes.

The most populous unorganized subdivision in Newfoundland and Labrador is Division 1, Subdivision E at 2,835 while six unorganized subdivisions are unpopulated.

The largest and smallest unorganized subdivisions by land area are Division 10, Subdivision D at 64,922.38 km^{2} (25,066.67 sq mi) and Division 1, Subdivision J at 0.45 km^{2} (0.17 sq mi) respectively.

== List ==
List of unorganized subdivisions in Newfoundland and Labrador
Name	Census division	2021 Census of Population				
Name	Census division	Population (2021)	Population (2016)	Change	Land area (km^{2})	Population density
Division 1, Subdivision A	1	653	666	−2.0%	772.38	0.8/km^{2}
Division 1, Subdivision B	1	356	360	−1.1%	454.34	0.8/km^{2}
Division 1, Subdivision C	1	106	100	+6.0%	815.64	0.1/km^{2}
Division 1, Subdivision D	1	119	88	+35.2%	298.06	0.4/km^{2}
Division 1, Subdivision E	1	2,835	2,943	−3.7%	218.85	13.0/km^{2}
Division 1, Subdivision F	1	539	548	−1.6%	173.02	3.1/km^{2}
Division 1, Subdivision G	1	1,673	1,866	−10.3%	302.69	5.5/km^{2}
Division 1, Subdivision H	1	328	390	−15.9%	57.2	5.7/km^{2}
Division 1, Subdivision I	1	320	299	+7.0%	64.11	5.0/km^{2}
Division 1, Subdivision J	1	0	0	NA	0.45	0.0/km^{2}
Division 1, Subdivision K	1	35	28	+25.0%	37.13	0.9/km^{2}
Division 1, Subdivision L	1	874	928	−5.8%	8.1	107.9/km^{2}
Division 1, Subdivision M	1	1,145	1,073	+6.7%	139.98	8.2/km^{2}
Division 1, Subdivision N	1	356	372	−4.3%	12.85	27.7/km^{2}
Division 1, Subdivision O	1	829	663	+25.0%	78.38	10.6/km^{2}
Division 1, Subdivision R	1	264	322	−18.0%	16.82	15.7/km^{2}
Division 1, Subdivision U	1	1,373	1,625	−15.5%	742.38	1.8/km^{2}
Division 1, Subdivision V	1	55	36	+52.8%	870.89	0.1/km^{2}
Division 1, Subdivision W	1	469	435	+7.8%	821.97	0.6/km^{2}
Division 1, Subdivision X	1	541	513	+5.5%	567.62	1.0/km^{2}
Division 1, Subdivision Y	1	1,211	1,118	+8.3%	190.76	6.3/km^{2}
Division 2, Subdivision C	2	538	566	−4.9%	1,463.65	0.4/km^{2}
Division 2, Subdivision D	2	204	226	−9.7%	33.17	6.2/km^{2}
Division 2, Subdivision E	2	251	246	+2.0%	136.58	1.8/km^{2}
Division 2, Subdivision F	2	99	117	−15.4%	198.89	0.5/km^{2}
Division 2, Subdivision G	2	25	10	+150.0%	366.98	0.1/km^{2}
Division 2, Subdivision H	2	196	178	+10.1%	269.35	0.7/km^{2}
Division 2, Subdivision I	2	123	136	−9.6%	491.98	0.3/km^{2}
Division 2, Subdivision J	2	0	0	NA	267.48	0.0/km^{2}
Division 2, Subdivision K	2	502	558	−10.0%	1,027.96	0.5/km^{2}
Division 2, Subdivision L	2	32	0	NA	873.62	0.0/km^{2}
Division 3, Subdivision A	3	45	24	+87.5%	2,940.14	0.0/km^{2}
Division 3, Subdivision B	3	0	0	NA	253.36	0.0/km^{2}
Division 3, Subdivision C	3	146	0	NA	711.65	0.2/km^{2}
Division 3, Subdivision D	3	188	262	−28.2%	6,611.07	0.0/km^{2}
Division 3, Subdivision E	3	74	89	−16.9%	2,468.1	0.0/km^{2}
Division 3, Subdivision F	3	115	119	−3.4%	2,548.59	0.0/km^{2}
Division 3, Subdivision H	3	562	707	−20.5%	665.06	0.8/km^{2}
Division 3, Subdivision I	3	61	87	−29.9%	2,121.16	0.0/km^{2}
Division 3, Subdivision J	3	38	51	−25.5%	646.31	0.1/km^{2}
Division 4, Subdivision A	4	1,530	1,743	−12.2%	1,204.46	1.3/km^{2}
Division 4, Subdivision B	4	1,140	1,174	−2.9%	1,809.34	0.6/km^{2}
Division 4, Subdivision C	4	591	747	−20.9%	2,365.45	0.2/km^{2}
Division 4, Subdivision D	4	1,212	860	+40.9%	1,148.81	1.1/km^{2}
Division 4, Subdivision E	4	1,467	1,957	−25.0%	295.42	5.0/km^{2}
Division 5, Subdivision A	5	291	276	+5.4%	2,412.93	0.1/km^{2}
Division 5, Subdivision C	5	285	276	+3.3%	483.5	0.6/km^{2}
Division 5, Subdivision D	5	30	34	−11.8%	1,320.15	0.0/km^{2}
Division 5, Subdivision E	5	188	216	−13.0%	1,167.5	0.2/km^{2}
Division 5, Subdivision F	5	746	823	−9.4%	823.72	0.9/km^{2}
Division 5, Subdivision G	5	414	468	−11.5%	3,409.22	0.1/km^{2}
Division 6, Subdivision A	6	101	128	−21.1%	5,264.73	0.0/km^{2}
Division 6, Subdivision C	6	354	681	−48.0%	4,007.24	0.1/km^{2}
Division 6, Subdivision D	6	596	563	+5.9%	4,180.74	0.1/km^{2}
Division 6, Subdivision E	6	175	194	−9.8%	2,294.74	0.1/km^{2}
Division 7, Subdivision A	7	140	143	−2.1%	287.64	0.5/km^{2}
Division 7, Subdivision B	7	57	10	+470.0%	858.94	0.1/km^{2}
Division 7, Subdivision D	7	259	230	+12.6%	2,457.85	0.1/km^{2}
Division 7, Subdivision E	7	2,573	2,649	−2.9%	1,631.51	1.6/km^{2}
Division 7, Subdivision F	7	831	846	−1.8%	296.95	2.8/km^{2}
Division 7, Subdivision G	7	316	343	−7.9%	144.35	2.2/km^{2}
Division 7, Subdivision I	7	80	71	+12.7%	170.8	0.5/km^{2}
Division 7, Subdivision J	7	577	459	+25.7%	272.61	2.1/km^{2}
Division 7, Subdivision K	7	1,153	1,275	−9.6%	484.96	2.4/km^{2}
Division 7, Subdivision L	7	1,183	1,232	−4.0%	242.89	4.9/km^{2}
Division 7, Subdivision M	7	1,856	1,966	−5.6%	450.25	4.1/km^{2}
Division 7, Subdivision N	7	55	49	+12.2%	1,402.03	0.0/km^{2}
Division 8, Subdivision A	8	386	317	+21.8%	2,270.17	0.2/km^{2}
Division 8, Subdivision C	8	563	440	+28.0%	1,213.88	0.5/km^{2}
Division 8, Subdivision D	8	5	10	−50.0%	20.11	0.2/km^{2}
Division 8, Subdivision E	8	496	548	−9.5%	707.99	0.7/km^{2}
Division 8, Subdivision F	8	867	930	−6.8%	106.35	8.2/km^{2}
Division 8, Subdivision G	8	409	433	−5.5%	521.39	0.8/km^{2}
Division 8, Subdivision H	8	1,788	1,900	−5.9%	178.01	10.0/km^{2}
Division 8, Subdivision I	8	163	216	−24.5%	8.97	18.2/km^{2}
Division 8, Subdivision L	8	2,772	3,060	−9.4%	1,315.12	2.1/km^{2}
Division 8, Subdivision M	8	141	130	+8.5%	658.7	0.2/km^{2}
Division 8, Subdivision O	8	275	309	−11.0%	409.66	0.7/km^{2}
Division 8, Subdivision P	8	297	337	−11.9%	379.19	0.8/km^{2}
Division 9, Subdivision A	9	183	121	+51.2%	1,726.94	0.1/km^{2}
Division 9, Subdivision C	9	2,220	2,529	−12.2%	1,842.14	1.2/km^{2}
Division 9, Subdivision D	9	534	643	−17.0%	939.74	0.6/km^{2}
Division 9, Subdivision F	9	81	71	+14.1%	4,933.82	0.0/km^{2}
Division 9, Subdivision G	9	96	41	+134.1%	1,256.12	0.1/km^{2}
Division 9, Subdivision H	9	155	159	−2.5%	2,096.29	0.1/km^{2}
Division 10, Subdivision A	10	55	61	−9.8%	3,673.46	0.0/km^{2}
Division 10, Subdivision B	10	211	369	−42.8%	35,501.56	0.0/km^{2}
Division 10, Subdivision C	10	54	71	−23.9%	62,096.93	0.0/km^{2}
Division 10, Subdivision D	10	732	705	+3.8%	64,922.38	0.0/km^{2}
Division 10, Subdivision E	10	0	0	NA	24,865.49	0.0/km^{2}
Division 11, Subdivision C	11	0	0	NA	26,193.25	0.0/km^{2}
Division 11, Subdivision E	11	0	0	NA	40,487.59	0.0/km^{2}

== See also ==
- List of communities in Newfoundland and Labrador
- List of designated places in Newfoundland and Labrador
- List of municipalities in Newfoundland and Labrador
- List of population centres in Newfoundland and Labrador
