= List of census divisions of Newfoundland and Labrador =

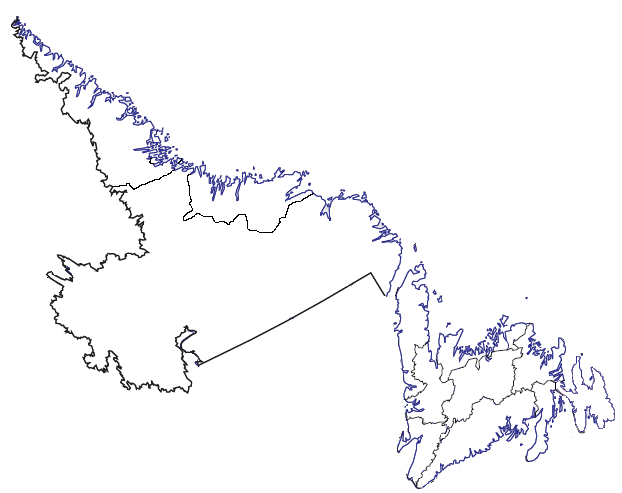
Map of Newfoundland and Labrador showing the 11 census divisions Statistics Canada divides the province into.

The Canadian province of Newfoundland and Labrador is divided into 11 census divisions, which are numbered 1 to 11.

Unlike in some other provinces, census divisions do not reflect the organization of local government in Newfoundland and Labrador. The areas exist solely for the purposes of statistical analysis and presentation and have no government of their own, as the province has no level of government between the provincial and municipal level.

== List of census divisions ==
The region and largest community are listed:

- Division No. 1, Newfoundland and Labrador (Avalon Peninsula-St. John's)
- Division No. 2, Newfoundland and Labrador (Burin Peninsula-Marystown)
- Division No. 3, Newfoundland and Labrador (South Coast-Channel-Port aux Basques)
- Division No. 4, Newfoundland and Labrador (St. George's-Stephenville)
- Division No. 5, Newfoundland and Labrador (Humber District-Corner Brook)
- Division No. 6, Newfoundland and Labrador (Central Newfoundland-Grand Falls-Windsor)
- Division No. 7, Newfoundland and Labrador (Bonavista/Trinity-Clarenville)
- Division No. 8, Newfoundland and Labrador (Notre Dame Bay-Lewisporte)
- Division No. 9, Newfoundland and Labrador (Northern Peninsula-St. Anthony)
- Division No. 10, Newfoundland and Labrador (Labrador-Happy Valley-Goose Bay)
- Division No. 11, Newfoundland and Labrador (Nunatsiavut-Nain)

== Historical districts ==
Newfoundland was once divided into historical districts:

- Bay de Verde
- Bonavista
- Burgeo and La Poile
- Burin
- Carbonear
- Ferryland
- Fogo
- Fortune Bay
- Harbour Grace
- Harbour Main
- Labrador
- Placentia and St. Mary's
- Port de Grave
- St. Barbe's
- St. George's-Port au Port
- St. John's East
- St. John's West
- Trinity
- Twillingate

== See also ==
- Administrative divisions of Canada
- Subdivisions of Canada
