= Devil Bay (Newfoundland and Labrador) =

Natural bay in Newfoundland and Labrador, Canada

Coordinates: 47.633°N 56.615°W

Devil Bay is natural bay on the island of Newfoundland in the province of Newfoundland and Labrador, Canada. Its features include waterfalls and a steep bluff. It is near Hare Bay and Rencontre Bay.
