= Rencontre Bay =

Natural bay in Newfoundland and Labrador, Canada

Coordinates: 47.616°N 56.681°W

Rencontre Bay is natural bay on the island of Newfoundland in the province of Newfoundland and Labrador, Canada. It is near Devil Bay.
