= Humber Valley =

The Humber Valley is a region in the western part of the island of Newfoundland. The Humber Valley is formed by the Humber River.

The upper part of the valley follows the Upper Humber River (upstream from Deer Lake) and contains the communities of Reidville and Cormack.

After the river discharges into Deer Lake, the valley broadens to include the entire width of the lake including the town of Deer Lake, as well as the local service districts of St. Judes and Pynn's Brook, and the town of Pasadena.

The valley narrows at the western end of the lake where it discharges into the Lower Humber River. This remaining part of the valley includes the local service district of Little Rapids, as well as the Humber Valley Golf Resort which is adjacent to the Marble Mountain Ski Resort, and the community of Steady Brook.

The valley ends at the eastern end of Corner Brook where the river discharges into the Bay of Islands at the appropriately named "Humbermouth".

The Humber Valley region has a population of about 36,000, making it the major hub for Western Newfoundland. It is considered one of the most picturesque areas of the province.

The Humber Valley region is sometimes extended to include the communities of Howley, Jackson's Arm and Hampden.

== Regional Council ==
The Great Humber Joint Council was formed by various towns in the Humber Valley Region and consists of:

Member communities

- Deer Lake
- Pasadena
- Steady Brook
- Cormack
- Glenburnie-Birchy Head-Shoal Brook (1)
- Corner Brook
- Massey Drive
- Irishtown-Summerside
- Hughes Brook
- Meadows
- Gillams
- McIvers
- Cox's Cove
- Mount Moriah
- Jackson's Arm
- Hampden
- Howley

Past active member communities

- Reidville
- Humber Arm South

Observing member communities

- Sop's Arm (2)
- Pollards Point (2)
- St. Jude's (2)
- Pynn's Brook (2)
- Little Rapids (2)

Non-active member communities

- Lark Harbour
- York Harbour

(1) GBS is not in the region but the community asked for membership and the borders were shifted to accommodate this addition.

(2) These communities are not incorporated municipalities, rather they are Local Service Districts.

== Electoral representation ==
Federally, the region is represented by the riding of Long Range Mountains. Provincially it is spread across three districts: Corner Brook, Humber-Gros Morne, and Humber-Bay of Islands.

== Economy ==
People in the region work in many different areas like the Kruger pulp mill in Corner Brook, which has a major economic presence in the region; this mill also operates the Deer Lake hydro-electric generating station. The Deer Lake Regional Airport, along with various government departments and facilities, Grenfell Campus, Memorial University, limited agriculture, and a growing tourism industry centred on the Humber Valley Resort, the Marble Mountain Ski Resort, and the region's proximity to Gros Morne National Park are major economic instigators.

== See also ==
- List of communities in Newfoundland and Labrador
