= Pasadena, Newfoundland and Labrador =

Pasadena Crown of the Valley
- Town
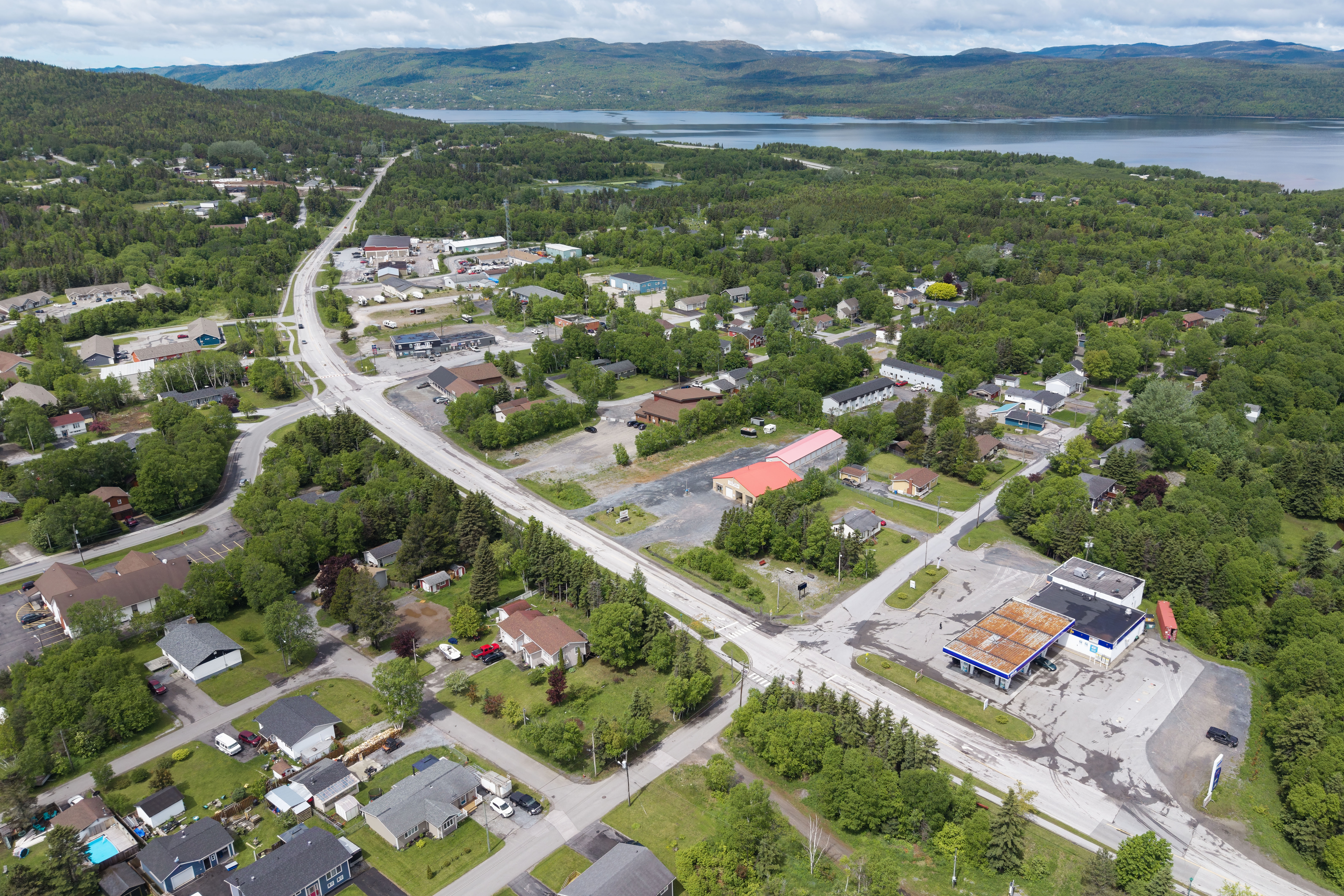
- Pasadena (2026)

- Seal
- Motto: Crown of the Valley
- Location of Pasadena in Newfoundland
- Coordinates: 49°00′58″N 57°36′18″W
- Country: Canada
- Province: Newfoundland and Labrador
- Settled: Early 1920s
- Incorporated: 1969

Government
  - Type: Pasadena Town Council
  - Mayor: Darren Gardner
  - CAO: Brian Hudson
  - MHA: Hal Cormier (PC)
  - MP: Carol Anstey (CONS)

Area
  - Total: 49.16 km^{2} (18.98 sq mi)
- Elevation: 30 m (98 ft)

Population (2021)
  - Total: 3,524
  - Density: 71.68/km^{2} (185.7/sq mi)
- Time zone: UTC– 3:30 (Newfoundland Time)
  - Summer (DST): UTC– 2:30 (Newfoundland Daylight)
- Postal code span: A0L
- Area code: 709
- Highways: Route 1 (TCH)
- Website: Town of Pasadena

Pasadena (/ˌpæsəˈdiːnə/ PASS-ə-DEE-nə) is an incorporated town located in census division 5 which is in the western portion of Newfoundland, Canada. The suburban community is situated on the shores of Deer Lake at the junction of the North Arm Valley and the Humber Valley.

The town was named after Pasadena, California. The meaning of the name, according to the municipal website of the Californian town, derives from the Ojibwe (Chippewa) word for "valley".

== History ==
The Town of Pasadena formerly consisted of three separate communities: South Brook, Pasadena and Midland.

=== South Brook ===
South Brook was located on the sandy shore of Deer Lake. It evolved much earlier than Pasadena, starting out in the early 1920s as a logging camp for the Bowater Company from Corner Brook. The railway also used South Brook, but only as a stop along its route across the island. In 1921, the census showed that South Brook only had a population of 6 people, within 2 families.

However, South Brook area soon saw an increase in activity, when the Bowaters Company started up its woods operations. It established a bunkhouse, cook-house and a company store to supply the needs of the areas wood camps. These camps would employ as many as 100 loggers during the winter months. Logging was the main industry in South Brook. However, the community also had a good supply of rock, which was suitable for the building of the power house in Deer Lake. As such, a quarry was set up in South Brook; rock quarried there was shipped to Deer Lake by train.

Homes began to spring up in South Brook as the men coming to work in the wood camps brought their families with them. With women and children living there, schools, medical aid, and recreation facilities were needed. Church services were held in people’s houses at first; later, all religions used the school as their church.

=== Pasadena ===
In 1923, Leonard Earle, a business man in St. John's, who had a small 11-acre (45,000 m^{2}) farm on the outskirts of the city, heard about some suitable farm land on the West Coast in the Humber Valley area. Wanting to get into farming full-time, he decided to visit the area and attempt to purchase some land. He discussed the acquisition of the land with the paper company officials, but the talks foundered when it was discovered that the company did not own the land. Thus, Earle was forced to return to his small farm in the city.

Ten years later, in 1933, Earle was informed that a 2,500-acre (10 km^{2}) block of land, the same land that he had been interested in years earlier, was for sale. Seizing the opportunity, he sold his St. John's farm and immediately purchased the farmland in the Humber Valley. In the summer of 1933, he hired a group of men from Corner Brook to build a house; with the help of some men that came with him, he cleared the land by hand and capstan. They built bridges and barns and planted vegetables. The flat fertile land and the temperate climate provided ideal conditions for growing such crops as potatoes and carrots. Earle decided to call this part of the Humber Valley, Pasadena, in honour of his wife, who had once lived in Pasadena, California, and also in honour of their marriage, as that is where they were married. The name Pasadena is derived from an Ojibwa (or Chippewa) word meaning "valley", "valley town", "key of the big valley", or "crown of the valley".

The Earles may have been the first family to settle in Pasadena, but it was not long before others became interested in the little community. The first winter, the Earles were joined by Mr. and Mrs. Joseph Ryan. Later that same year, three section men with the Newfoundland Railway, Ned Carter, Jim Carter, and Douglas Tapp were transferred to the area. It was these five families that formed the nucleus of what was to become the Community of Pasadena.

=== Midland ===
The third community area, the community of Midland, evolved in 1936 as part of a government relocation program. Due to a severe decline in the inshore fishery around the Avalon Peninsula, many families were starving and the government of commission began to look for some other means of livelihood for them.

It was on the forest-covered, level land, next door to Pasadena, that the government land settlement began. It was named Midland because of its position – halfway between Deer Lake and Corner Brook. Potential settlers for this community came from outlying areas of the island deeply affected by the Great Depression. The 25 men involved in the resettlement program came from Argentia, Red Island, Lamaline, Burin, Bell Island, and Clarke’s Beach. In June 1936, the men came to Midland. With just one tractor, supplied by the government, they started clearing the land, in preparation for their families to join them. The men cleared two 20-acre (81,000 m^{2}) fields and used them as a community farm until their own individual land was ready. All vegetables grown were taken to the government store to be sold and any profits were shared among the men.

In September 1936, all 25 homes were ready for occupancy. The homes were very simple. There was no electricity or running water and all the bathrooms were located about 30 feet back in the woods. All homes were built and painted alike. Finally that day in September arrived when the men settlers from Midland went to the railway in Pasadena to meet their families. To transport their families and their few belongings from the station, a platform with seats was built on a horse-drawn cart.

Over the years, roads were improved and more land was cleared, but the farms never materialized. Each settler had been given 35 acres (140,000 m^{2}) of land but they only cleared enough land to meet their immediate requirements. It was not long before many of the men were seeking employment elsewhere, such as the American base (Ernest Harmon Air Force Base in Stephenville) and with the Pulp and Paper Industry in Corner Brook. Several of the original settlers even returned to their home towns, preferring fishing to farming.

=== Amalgamation ===
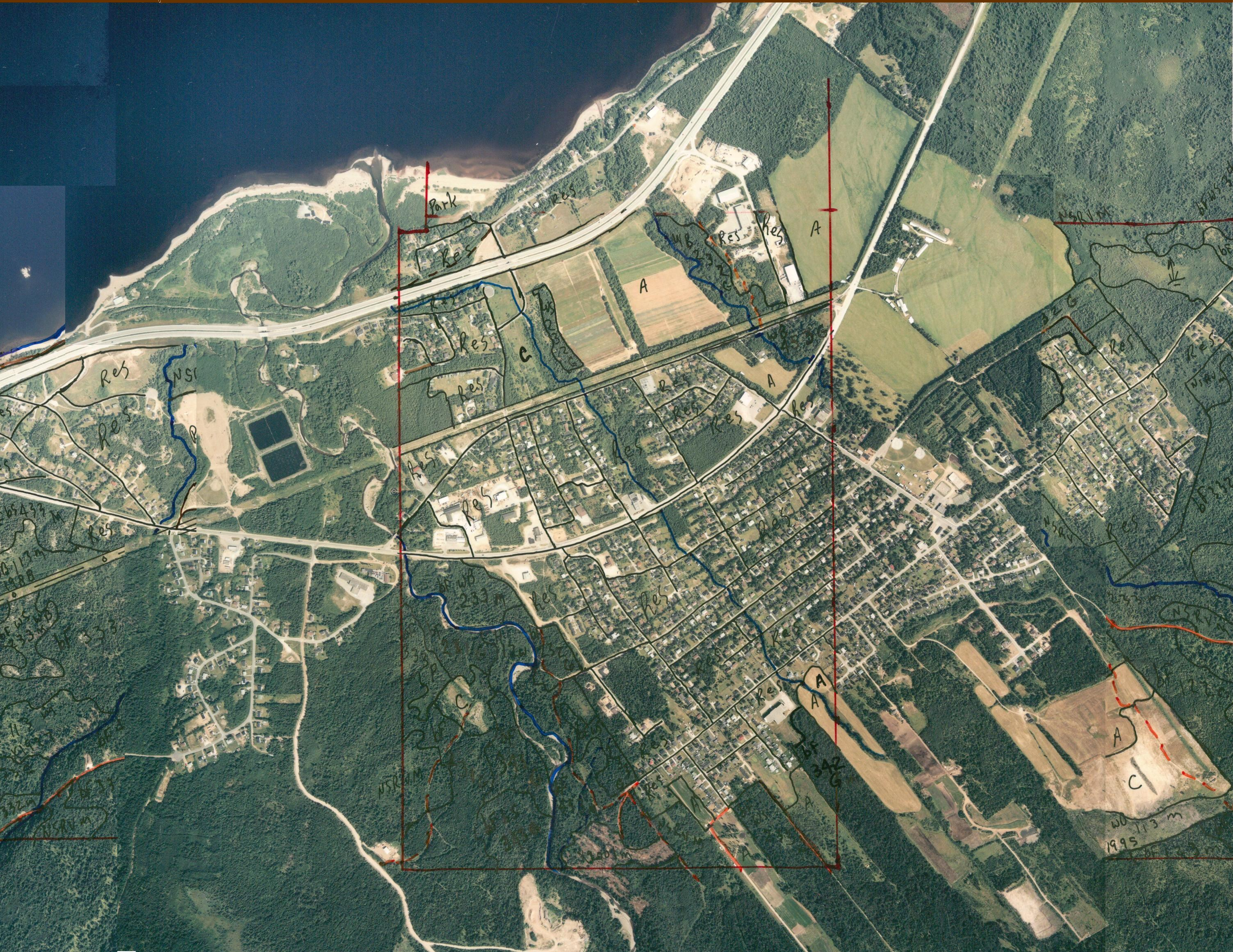
Pasadena Air Photo (2001)

The communities were incorporated in 1955, adopting the name of The Community of Pasadena-Midland. The first Community Council of Pasadena-Midland consisted of Charles Bonnell, Chairman; Nelson Bennett, Secretary; and Allan French, Councillor.

Very little growth took place in the Community of Pasadena-Midland until 1969 when the community status gave way to town status, and was named the Town of Pasadena. The first mayor was Gordon Clarke.

The town experienced rapid growth after receiving its town status. In 1971, the population of Pasadena was 891, but by 1985, it had risen to more than 3,200. In 1985, after much persistence from the town council, the whole town was serviced with municipal water and sewage, all main streets were paved, and a Town Plan and Development Regulations were in place to ensure the orderly growth and development of the town.

It was about this time that the Department of Municipal Affairs in St. John's began to see the possibilities of another merger, this time between the Town of Pasadena and its much smaller neighbor to the west, the Community of South Brook. South Brook had not received nearly as much attention as Pasadena, and could benefit greatly if merged with Pasadena. In 1985, negotiations between the two Councils and the Department of Municipal Affairs for the amalgamation of the Town of Pasadena and the Community of South Brook began.

After much debate between both communities, a consensus in favour of amalgamation was reached. On January 1, 1986, the Community of South Brook was amalgamated with the Town of Pasadena. A new town plan had to be drawn up to incorporate the increased municipal boundaries, a new Comprehensive Development Plan was also prepared to ensure linkage of existing municipal services and pre-planned future expansion. As a result of the continued growth and the addition of the smaller neighboring community, the projections for the future are showing a continuing steady growth in all sections.

=== Recent history ===
In 2012, Pasadena celebrated a "Come Home Year" with hundreds of people visiting during the ten days of festivities in late July of that year.

In October 2016, the town officially opened Pasadena Place. Pasadena Place is a town-owned recreational facility and community meeting place. The facility has a gymnasium, community meeting rooms, a walking track, rock wall, community kitchen, and a fitness centre. The municipality's other recreational facilities include playgrounds, a sensory playground, baseball field, softball fields, soccer facilities, basketball court, tennis courts, a pump track and a number of walking, running, skiing and outdoor community spaces.

Pasadena's growth has seen an influx of young families. The Treehouse Family Resource Centre has a schedule which is designed to cater to the needs of young families in the town and region. Most residents commute to Corner Brook for work.

== Demographics ==
In the 2021 Census of Population conducted by Statistics Canada, Pasadena had a population of 3,524 living in 1,494 of its 1,598 total private dwellings, a change of −2.7% from its 2016 population of 3,620. With a land area of 49.17 km^{2} (18.98 sq mi), it had a population density of 71.7/km^{2} (185.6/sq mi) in 2021.

Demographics
Median age	47.8 (2016)
Number of families	1,240 (2016)
Number of married couples	795 (2016)
Total number of dwellings	1,598
Catholic	28.2%
Protestant	69.9%

== Local attractions ==
- Humber Valley Golf Resort
- Marble Mountain Ski Resort
- Pasadena Beach
- Pasadena Ski and Nature Park

== See also ==
- List of cities and towns in Newfoundland and Labrador
- List of people of Newfoundland and Labrador
