= Mount Musgrave =

Mountain in Newfoundland and Labrador

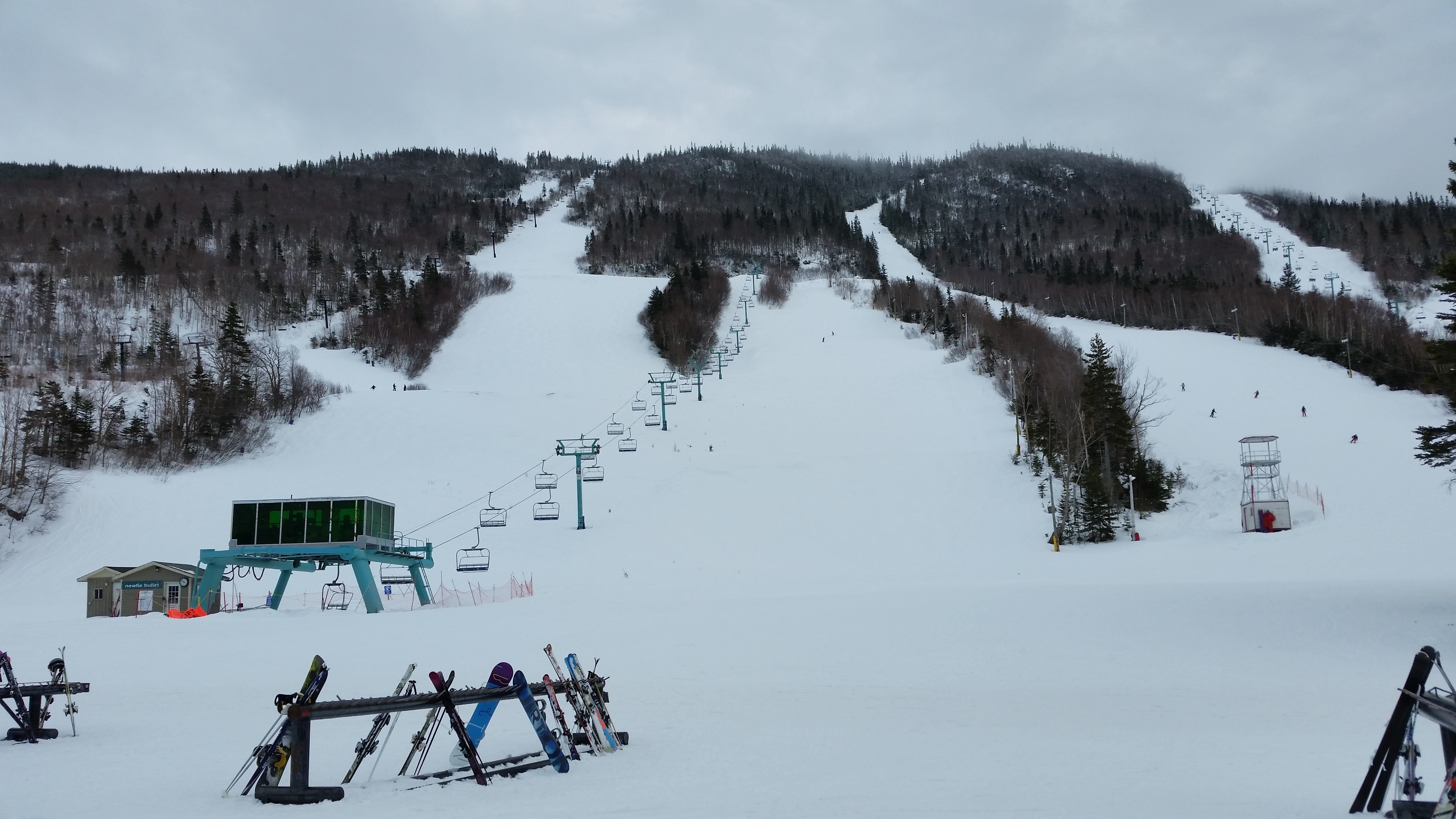

Highest point
- Elevation: 546 m (1,791 ft)
- Prominence: 546 m (1,791 ft)
- Coordinates: 48°55′48″N 57°50′02″W

Geography
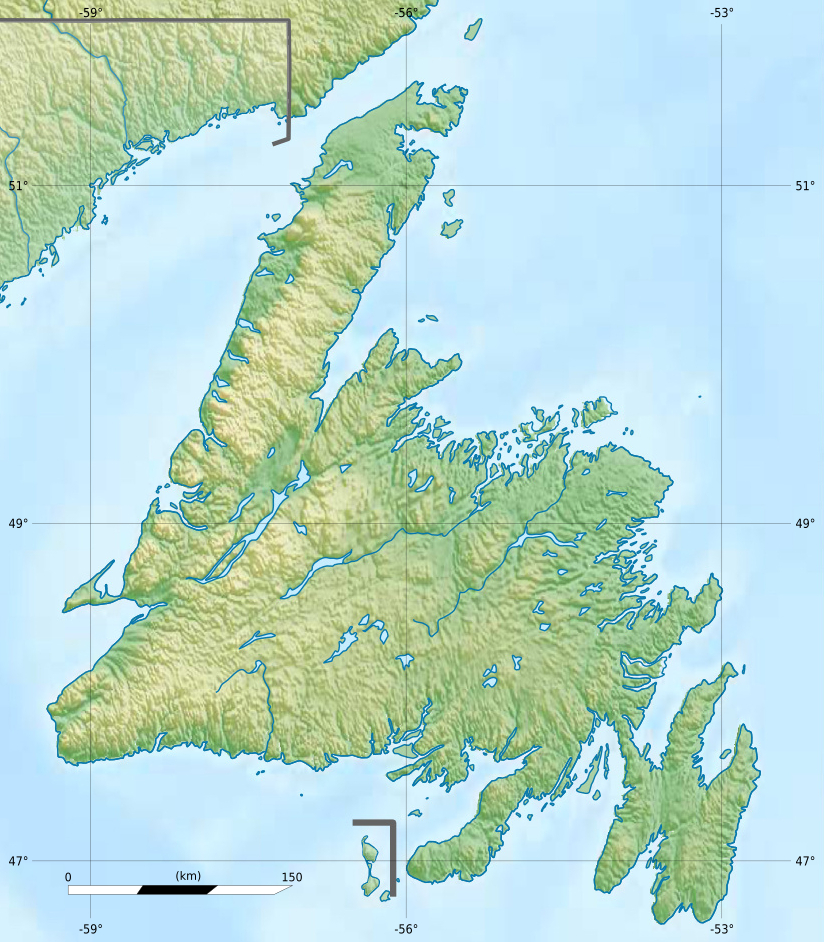
- Location within Newfoundland
- Location: Newfoundland, Canada
- Parent range: Long Range Mountains
- Topo map: NTS 12A13 Corner Brook

Climbing
- Easiest route: class 1 scramble

Mount Musgrave is a mountain located in western Newfoundland, near the southern side of the Humber River valley at Steady Brook, approximately 7 km (4 mi) east of Corner Brook. The peak is named in honour of Sir Anthony Musgrave, a colonial governor of Newfoundland.

The steep ridges that form part of the northern side of the mountain are the location of Marble Mountain Ski Resort, the largest alpine ski resort in Atlantic Canada. The summit of the mountain hosts Environment Canada's doppler weather radar station "XME", part of the Canadian weather radar network.

== See also ==
- Mountain peaks of Canada
