= King City weather radar station =

- Location within Ontario Location within Canada
- Coordinates: 43°57′50″N 79°34′25″W
- Country: Canada
- Province: Ontario
- Regional municipality: York Region
- Township: King
- Community: King City
- Elevation: 358.5 m (1,176 ft)
- Time zone: UTC−05:00 (Eastern Standard Time)
  - Summer (DST): UTC−04:00 (Eastern Daylight Time)
- Type: Research station and weather radar

The King City weather radar station (ICAO site identifier CASKR (CWKR prior to 2021)) is a weather radar located in King City, Ontario, Canada. It is operated by Environment Canada and is part of the Canadian weather radar network, for which it is the primary research station.

The 16.45 hectare site is listed at an elevation of 360 m, and the tower is 27 m tall.

Mounted on the tower was a 5 cm weather radar, and a C-band dual-polarization radar system, installed at the site in 2004, which was replaced during the modernization program of Canadian weather radar network of 2021 by an S band (10 cm), dual-polarization radar.

== Research ==
The station serves a number of research roles, and collects data to fulfill those observational needs. It is "responsible for providing national leadership on radar meteorology research applications".

In 1984, the Research Directorate of the Atmospheric Environment Service established the first Canadian weather radar with Doppler capability in King City. In 2004, a dual-polarization radar was installed for further research. These systems are used for predictive purposes, and the data collected is used for weather forecasts for the Greater Toronto Area and the Golden Horseshoe.

Further, under the auspices of the Cloud Physics and Severe Weather Research Section of Environment Canada, the King Doppler Weather Radar Research Facility collects data for research.

The radar can be useful for observing bird migration patterns, especially when data is taken in aggregate with that of other radar stations. Current active research in dual-polarization radar includes winter precipitation, detection and short-term forecasting of high-impact weather events, quantitative precipitation estimation, satellite validation, and particle type identification.

== Equipment ==
The WSR82D radar installed in 1982 had a fiberglass laminate radome, and a parabolic reflector with a diameter of 6.1m and linear horizontal polarisation. Its gain was 48 dB. The radar emitted a 260 kW beam with a frequency of 5625 MHz and wavelength of 5.33 cm having a beam width of 0.65 degrees. In conventional operation, it had a pulse duration of 2 μs, pulse repetition frequency of 250 pulses per second, and performed 6.0 scanning rotations per minute. In Doppler operation, it had a pulse duration of 0.5 μs, alternating pulse repetition frequencies of 892 and 1190 pulses per second, and a scan rate of 0.75 rotations per minute. In long-range Doppler operation, a pulse repetition frequency of 650 pulses per second and a scan rate of 2 rotations per minute were used. It was replaced in 2004 by a similar radar but with dual polarization capabilities, installed at a height of 27 m.

During the modernization program of Canadian weather radar network, it is being replaced again on the same site in the spring of 2021 by an S band and dual-polarization radar with an estimated construction date from March to June. This new radar uses a klystron, instead of a magnetron, and has:

- Frequency : 2.7 - 2.9 GHz
- Pulse repetition frequency (PRF): 250 – 2000 Hz
- Pulse length (τ): 0.4 μs ... 4.5 μs
- Peak power: 750 kW
- Doppler range: 240 km
- Reflectivity normal range: 300 km
- maximum range: 600 km
- Velocity resolution : ± 146 m/s
- Antenna diameter: 8.5 m
- Beamwidth : < 1°
- Rotation: 6 min^{−1}
