= Nicholsville, Newfoundland =

Hamlet in Newfoundland, Canada

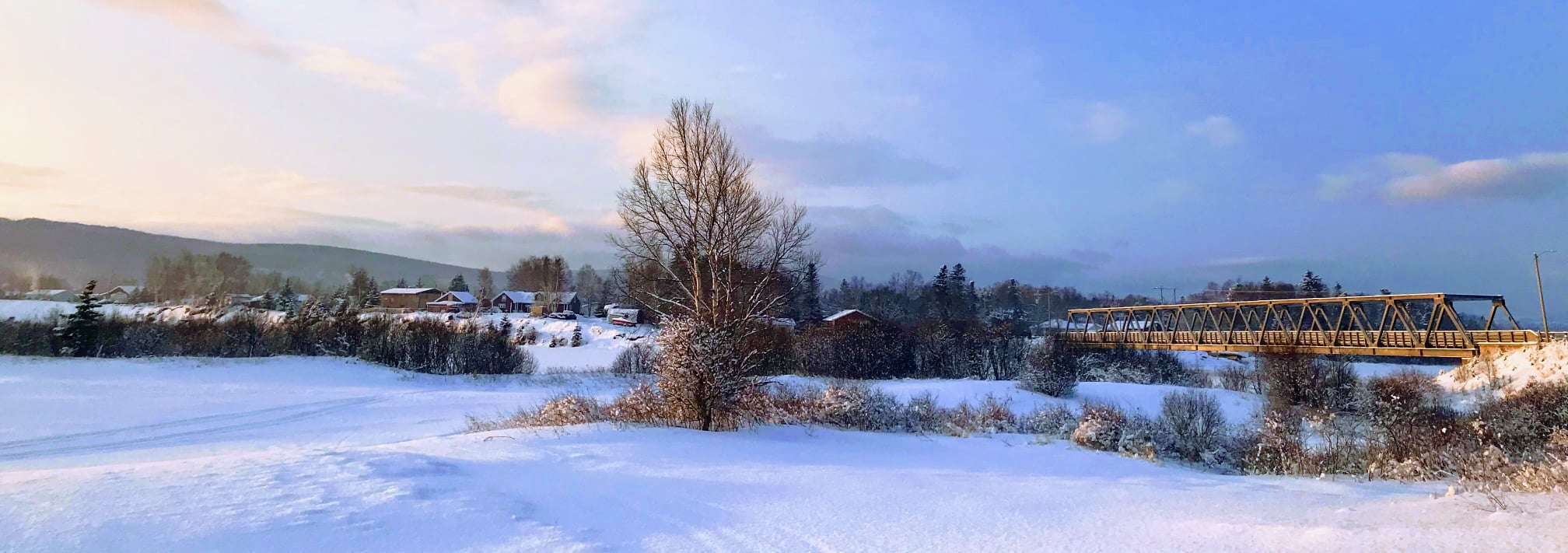
Nicholsville, Newfoundland during winter.

Nicholsville is a hamlet located to the north of, and contiguous with, Deer Lake in Newfoundland, Canada. The hamlet has access to Deer Lake Beach and the Humber River.

It had a population of 509 residents in 1986. In 1994, Nicholsville was amalgamated with Deer Lake, since when specific population statistics for the hamlet have not been recorded.

== History ==
In 1872, a family from Cape Breton Island, led by George Aaron Nichols Sr., settled on the eastern shore of the lake and initiated a pine tree cutting operation. This location was named Nicholsville and experienced growth with the construction of the railway during the 1880s and 1890s.

In 1994, the boundaries of Deer Lake underwent a significant expansion through the amalgamation with two smaller communities, Nicholsville and Spillway.
