= Deer Lake (Newfoundland and Labrador) =

Lake in Newfoundland, Canada

- Qalipue'katik (Mi'kmaq)
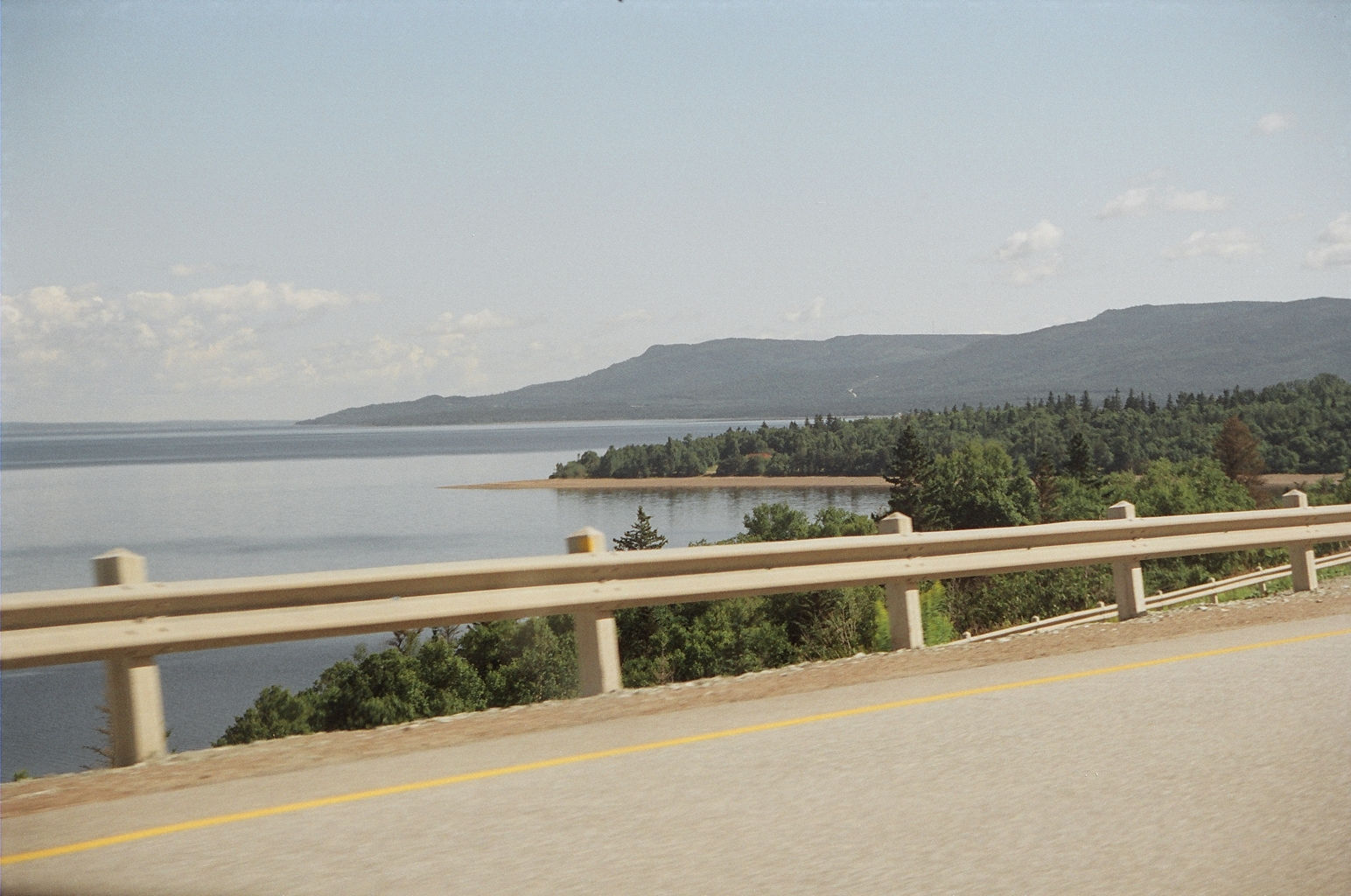

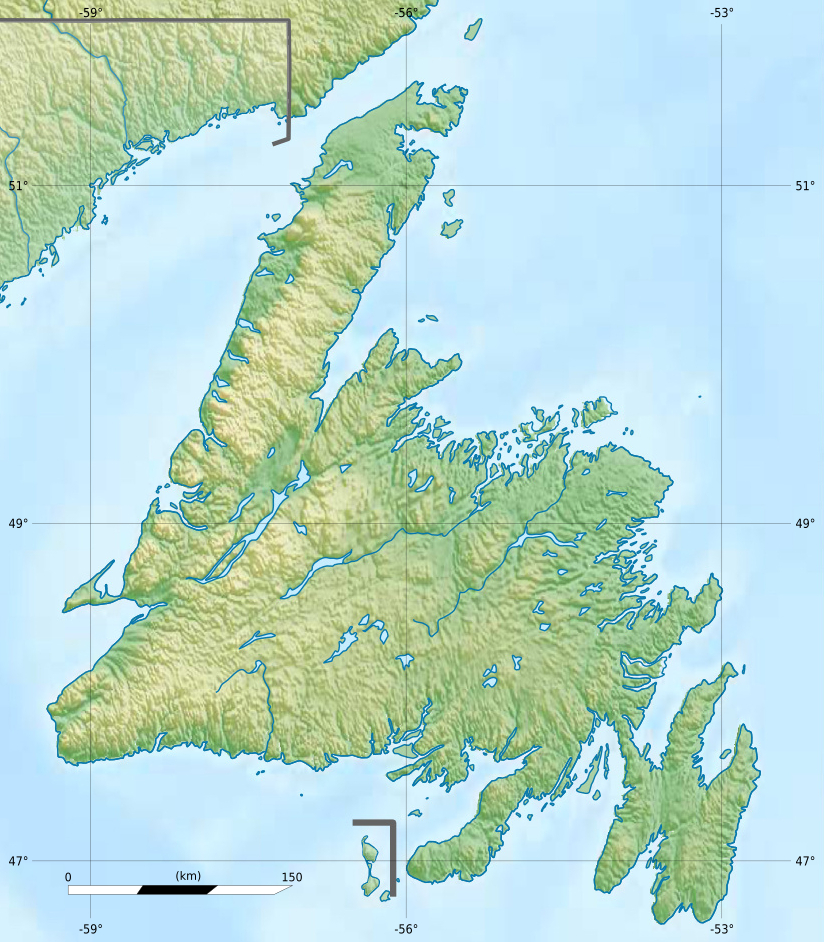
- Location within Newfoundland
- Location: Newfoundland, Canada
- Coordinates: 49.0925°N 57.5728°W
- Primary inflows: upper Humber River
- Primary outflows: lower Humber River
- Basin countries: Canada
- Settlements: Deer Lake, Pasadena

Deer Lake is a lake situated in the western part of the island of Newfoundland, Canada.

Its name is derived from the nickname European settlers to the Humber River valley gave to the woodland caribou, who termed these animals "deer".

The town of Deer Lake is situated on the northeastern shore of the lake at the outlet of the upper Humber River. The lower Humber River drains Deer Lake near the village of Little Rapids. Deer Lake is approximately 50km northeast of Corner Brook.

== See also ==
- List of lakes of Newfoundland and Labrador
