= Australia's weather radars =

Bureau of Meteorology weather radars
- Radar sites of the BoM network, and indicative radar coverage in 2026. Inner radius (100 km) indicates generally reliable coverage. Outer radius (200 km) indicates general limit of potentially useful coverage. Beyond 200km, coverage is generally unreliable due to earth curvature but may occasionally be useful in larger weather systems such as tropical cyclones or intense thunderstorms. Note: Does not show coverage degradation from obstructions.
- Country of origin: Australia
- Manufacturer: Various
- No. built: 68
- Type: non Doppler, Doppler and dual polarisation
- Frequency: C and S bands

The majority of Australia's weather radars are operated by the Bureau of Meteorology (BoM), an executive agency of the Australian Government. The radar network is continually being upgraded with new technology such as doppler and dual polarisation to provide better now-casting. Doppler weather radars are able to detect the movement of precipitation, making it very useful in detecting damaging winds associated with precipitation, and determining if a thunderstorm has a rotating updraft, a key indicator of the presence of the most dangerous type of thunderstorm, a supercell.

The new dual polarisation radars give forecasters the ability to:

- detect debris in the atmosphere, leading to more accurate tornado warnings;
- distinguish between different precipitation types, leading to better estimations of hail size and severity;
- better identify areas of heavy rainfall, leading to more accurate flood warnings; and
- discern between precipitation and non-meteorological echoes such as chaff, birds, and insects.

== The dual polarisation transition ==
The transition to polarimetric (dual-polarised) radars began in 2017 with the upgrade of 4 Meteor 1500 radars located in Melbourne, Brisbane, Adelaide, and Sydney. The network has further been enhanced through the installation of 8 new polarimetric Meteor 735 radars across WA, NSW & Victoria, and two polarimetric WRM200 radars manufactured by Vaisala, one to replace the radar in Dampier, WA which had been destroyed by severe tropical cyclone Damien in 2020, and one to replace an ageing radar near Gove in the Northern Territory. Nine new Meteor 1700s were also installed between 2021 and 2024, 7 located in Qld, and 2 in WA, all equipped with dual polarisation technology. All the radars with the model name 'Meteor' were manufactured by Selex ES, now Leonardo. A temporary polarimetric radar manufactured by Meteopress was installed at Wyndham in 2026 to replace the previous radar that had been severely damaged by lightning.

Specifications are available for the Meteor 735, Meteor 1700, Vaisala WRM200 and the Meteopress C band radar.

== Data Archive ==
Details and historical data from radars listed in the tables below are available through the Australian Unified Data Archive (AURA).

== Future radar network upgrades ==
The BoM has plans to:

- build a new radar at Tennant Creek
- build a new radar in SW Western Australia in the Manjimup-Pemberton region
- build a new radar in SW Queensland in the Quilpie region
- upgrade the Grafton Radar in the next 5-10 years to a dual-polarised doppler radar

== Australian Capital Territory ==
The Australian Capital Territory is served by the Captains Flat radar, located in New South Wales.

== New South Wales ==
Weather radars in New South Wales
Name	Location	Radar elevation AMSL (metres)	Model Name	Beamwidth (degrees)	Range Resolution (metres)	IEEE Frequency Band	Doppler	Dual Pol	Notes
Brewarrina	29°58′14.8″S 146°48′48.7″E	149	Meteor 735	1	250	C	Yes	Yes	Installed 2020
Canberra (Captains Flat)	35°39′41.2″S 149°30′44.1″E	1383	DWSR74S14-13	1.9	250	S	Yes	No	Upgraded 2013
Grafton	29°37′14.3″S 152°57′48″E	50	WSR74S-14	1.9	500	S	No	No	To Be Upgraded to a Dual-Polarising Radar within 5-10 years
Hillston	33°33′7.9″S 145°31′43″E	144	Meteor 735	1	250	C	Yes	Yes	Installed Aug 2021
Moree	29°29′24.9″S 149°50′46.3″E	222	WF100C-8	1.7	500	C	No	No	
Namoi (Blackjack Mountain)	31°1′27.2″S 150°11′31″E	720	DWSR8502S-14	1.9	250	S	Yes	No	
Newcastle	32°43′47.2″S 152°1′31.5″E	84	DWSR74S14-13	1.9	250	S	Yes	No	Upgraded Jun 2013
Norfolk Island	29°2′17.6″S 167°56′28.9″E	121	WF100C-8	1.7		C	No	No	
Sydney (Terrey Hills)	33°42′3″S 151°12′33.9″E	223	Meteor 1500	1	250	S	Yes	Yes	Upgraded 2017
Wagga Wagga	35°9′29.3″S 147°27′22.7″E	229	WF100C-8	1.7	500	C	No	No	
Wollongong (Appin)	34°15′44.4″S 150°52′30.4″E	472	DWSR8502S-14	1.9	250	S	Yes	No	Upgraded 2013
Yeoval	32°44′40.1″S 148°42′29.1″E	487	Meteor 735	1	250	C	Yes	Yes	Installed May 2022 The radar suffers moderate beam obstruction between approximately 70° and 130° due to an area of elevated terrain, meaning there is an underestimation of rain intensity in the lowest radar tilt between the same bearings.
~~Kurnell~~	~~34°0′53.1″S 151°13′34.4″E~~	~~64~~	~~WSR81C-12~~	~~1~~	~~250~~	~~C~~	Yes	No	Decommissioned Archived radar data is uploaded here

== Northern Territory ==
Weather radars in Northern Territory
Name	Location	Radar elevation AMSL (metres)	Model Name	Beamwidth (degrees)	Range Resolution (metres)	IEEE Frequency Band	Doppler	Dual Pol	Notes
Alice Springs	23°47′42.2″S 133°53′20.1″E	563	WF100C-8	1.7	500	C	No	No	
Darwin (Berrimah)	12°27′21.2″S 130°55′35.6″E	60	Wurrung 2502C	1	250	C	Yes	No	Upgraded Sep 2022
Darwin Airport	12°25′28.6″S 130°53′31.5″E	39	Wurrung 2502C	1.7	250	C	Yes	No	Upgraded 2022
Gove	12°16′8.1″S 136°49′13.2″E	63	WRM 200	1	250	C	Yes	Yes	Upgraded 2023
Katherine (Tindal)	14°30′44.5″S 132°26′35.3″E	225	WSR81C-8	1.7	500	C	No	No	
Warruwi	11°38′54.5″S 133°22′47.9″E	44	Wurrung 2502C	1	250	C	Yes	No	Installed Dec 2012

== Queensland ==
Weather radars in Queensland
Name	Location	Radar elevation AMSL (metres)	Model Name	Beamwidth (degrees)	Range Resolution (metres)	IEEE Frequency Band	Doppler	Dual Pol	Notes
Bowen	19°53′8.7″S 148°4′32.4″E	72	WF100C-8	1.7	500	C	No	No	
~~Brisbane Airport~~	~~27°23′29.5″S 153°7′47.9″E~~	~~12~~	~~MeteoPress C~~	~~1.7~~	~~250~~	~~C~~	Yes	Yes	Decommissioned
Brisbane (Mt Stapylton)	27°43′3.8″S 153°14′24″E	175	Meteor 1500	1	250	S	Yes	Yes	Upgraded Sep 2017
Cairns	16°49′5.4″S 145°39′46.9″E	661	Wurrung 2502C	1	250	C	Yes	No	Upgraded Aug 2023.
Emerald	23°32′58.4″S 148°14′21″E	211	DWSR 8502	1.9		S	Yes	No	
Gladstone	23°51′18.4″S 151°15′45″E	93	WSR-74	1.9		S	No	No	
Greenvale	18°59′51.5″S 144°59′45.1″E	512	Meteor 1700	1	250	S	Yes	Yes	Installed Dec 2021
Gympie (Mt Kanigan)	25°57′26.4″S 152°34′36.9″E	354	DWSR 8502	1.9		S	Yes	No	
Longreach	23°26′23.2″S 144°16′56.1″E	201	WF 100C-8	1.7		C	No	No	
Mackay	21°7′2.1″S 149°13′2.2″E	55	Meteor 1700	1	250	S	Yes	Yes	Upgraded Dec 2023.
Marburg	27°36′22.6″S 152°32′24.3″E	386	Meteor 1700	1	250	S	Yes	Yes	In November 2023, a new radar replaced an ageing WSR-74. The radar suffers beam blockage on the tilts 0.6° and 0.83° to the W and SW of the radar, leading to an under-representation of reflectivity values between those bearings.
Mornington Island	16°39′50.8″S 139°10′52.4″E	20	WF 100C-8	1.7		C	No	No	
Mount Isa	20°42′40.3″S 139°33′19″E	517	DWSR 8502	1.9		S	Yes	No	Installed Nov 2012
Richmond	20°45′6.3″S 143°8′29.2″E	245	Meteor 1700	1	250	S	Yes	Yes	Installed Sep 2022
Taroom	25°41′46.2″S 149°53′53.4″E	312	Meteor 1700	1	250	S	Yes	Yes	Installed Apr 2022
Toowoomba	27°16′27.1″S 151°59′35.2″E	781	Meteor 1700	1	250	S	Yes	Yes	Installed Apr 2024
Townsville (Hervey Range)	19°25′11.2″S 146°33′3.4″E	595	Meteor 1700	1	250	S	Yes	Yes	Upgraded Nov 2024
Warrego	26°26′24.6″S 147°20′56.8″E	534	TVDR 2500	1.7		C	Yes	No	Doppler data not viewable on BoM website
Weipa	12°39′59.1″S 141°55′28.7″E	44	Wurrung 2502C	1		C	Yes	No	Upgraded Aug 2015
Willis Island	16°17′14.7″S 149°57′52.5″E	20	Wurrung 2502C	1.7		C	Yes	No	Upgraded Nov 2022

== South Australia ==
Weather radars in South Australia
Name	Location	Radar elevation AMSL (metres)	Model Name	Beamwidth (degrees)	Range Resolution (metres)	IEEE Frequency Band	Doppler	Dual Pol	Notes
Adelaide (Buckland Park)	34°37′1.2″S 138°28′7.5″E	29	Meteor 1500	1	250	S	Yes	Yes	Upgraded 2017
Adelaide (Sellicks Hill)	35°19′46.3″S 138°30′9″E	395	WF 100C-8	1.7		C	No	No	
Ceduna	32°7′47.4″S 133°41′46.9″E	33	Wurrung 2502C	1.7		C	Yes	No	Upgraded May 2021
Mt Gambier	37°44′51.7″S 140°46′28.6″E	80	WF 100C-8	1.7		C	No	No	
Woomera	31°9′20.9″S 136°48′15.8″E	176	WF 100C-8	1.7		C	No	No	

== Tasmania ==
Weather radars in Tasmania
Name	Location	Radar elevation AMSL (metres)	Model Name	Beamwidth (degrees)	Range Resolution (metres)	IEEE Frequency Band	Doppler	Dual Pol	Notes
Hobart (Mt Koonya)	43°6′45.4″S 147°48′18.8″E	512	Wurrung 2502C	1		C	Yes	No	Upgraded Nov 2022
Hobart Airport	42°50′14.5″S 147°30′3.1″E	32	WF 100C-6	2		C	No	No	
N.W. Tasmania (West Takone)	41°10′45″S 145°34′47.9″E	601	Wurrung 2502C	1		C	Yes	No	Upgraded Apr 2016

== Victoria ==
Weather radar in Victoria
Name	Location	Radar elevation AMSL (metres)	Model Name	Beamwidth (degrees)	Range Resolution (metres)	IEEE Frequency Band	Doppler	Dual Pol	Notes
Bairnsdale	37°53′15.1″S 147°34′31.8″E	65	Wurrung 2502C	1.7		C	Yes	No	
Melbourne	37°51′18.8″S 144°45′19.5″E	45	Meteor 1500	1		S	Yes	Yes	Upgraded 2017
Melbourne (Broadmeadows)	37°41′23.5″S 144°56′50″E	123	Wurrung 2502C	1.7		C	Yes	No	
Mildura	34°17′13.6″S 141°35′53.5″E	80	Meteor 735	1		C	Yes	Yes	Installed near Cullulleraine 2020
Rainbow	35°59′51.2″S 142°0′47.9″E	149	Meteor 735	1		C	Yes	Yes	Installed Mar 2020
Yarrawonga	36°1′46.7″S 146°1′21.9″E	147	WSR 81C	1		C	Yes	No	

== Western Australia ==
Weather radars in Western Australia
Name	Location	Radar elevation AMSL (metres)	Model Name	Beamwidth (degrees)	Range Resolution (metres)	IEEE Frequency Band	Doppler	Dual Pol	Notes
Albany	34°56′30.5″S 117°48′58.9″E	93	Meteor 735	1		C	Yes	Yes	Upgraded 2019
Broome	17°56′53.7″S 122°14′7.2″E	31	Wurrung 2502C	1.6		C	Yes	No	
Carnarvon	24°53′16.7″S 113°40′9.7″E	28	Wurrung 2502	1		C	Yes	No	Upgraded 2024
~~Dampier~~	~~20°39′12.7″S 116°40′59.8″E~~	~~58~~	~~WRM 200~~	~~1~~	~~250~~	~~C~~	Yes	Yes	Decommissioned Oct 2026
Esperance	33°49′48.5″S 121°53′30.2″E	43	Meteor 735	1	250	C	Yes	Yes	Upgraded Feb 2020
Geraldton	28°48′16.8″S 114°41′50.4″E	48	Meteor 735	1	250	C	Yes	Yes	Upgraded 2019
Giles	25°1′59.6″S 128°18′6.2″E	607	WF 100C-6	2		C	No	No	
Halls Creek	18°13′44.1″S 127°39′46.1″E	439	Wurrung 2502C	1.7		C	Yes	No	Upgraded 2022 Doppler data not displayed on BoM website
Kalgoorlie	30°47′3.2″S 121°27′17.4″E	390	Wurrung 2502C	1		C	Yes	No	Upgraded 2021
Karratha	20°59′29.3″S 116°52′33″E	213	Meteor 1700	1	250	S	Yes	Yes	Installed Oct 2024
Learmonth	22°6′11.4″S 113°59′58.7″E	333	TVDR 2500	1.7		C	Yes	No	Doppler data not displayed on BoM website
Newdegate	33°5′49″S 119°0′31.6″E	340	Wurrung 2500C	1.7		C	Yes	No	Installed Oct 2016
Perth (Serpentine)	32°23′30.3″S 115°52′1″E	42	Meteor 1700	1	250	S	Yes	Yes	Upgraded Nov 2022
Perth Airport	31°55′38.2″S 115°58′32″E	25	Wurrung 2502C	1.7		C	Yes	No	Doppler data not displayed on BoM website
Port Hedland	20°22′18.7″S 118°37′54″E	24	TVDR 2500	1.7		C	No	No	
South Doodlakine	31°46′40″S 117°57′10″E	416	Wurrung 2502C	1.7		C	Yes	No	Installed Feb 2017
Watheroo	30°21′36.7″S 116°17′22.9″E	367	Wurrung 2502C	1.7		C	Yes	No	Installed Jun 2017
Wyndham	15°27′6.1″S 128°7′15″E	339	MeteoPress C	1.7	250	C	Yes	Yes	Upgraded Oct 2026

== Research Radars ==
Note:

- Whilst the BoM may/may not own these radars, they are often involved with the radars for research applications.

Research radars
Name	Location	Elevation	Operational status	Radar model	IEEE Frequency Band	Doppler	Dual Pol	Notes
CPOL	12.245°S 131.045°E	50m	Inactive (6/12/1998 - 2/5/2017)	N/A	C	Yes	Yes	The data which CPOL has collected is used to study the microphysical and dynamic properties of thunderstorm convection in Darwin, Australia, enabling the improvement of atmospheric models' representations of the convection formed during the pre-monsoon buildup and active monsoon.
CP2	27.6689°S 152.8627°E	185.5m	Inactive (1/11/2007 - 1/6/2015)	N/A	S & X	Yes	Yes	The CP2 Research radar was a 1970's era radar, which the BoM received as a gift from the NCAR in the United States. The BoM retrofitted it with modern parts which gave it the unique ability to collect data at two frequencies, S and X band. The upgrades also provided state of the art dual polarisation and doppler technologies. The CP in its title stands for cloud physics, and the radar has been used to research thunderstorms, drive improvements in rainfall measurements and hail detection and explore the potential for cloud seeding.
Ocean Pol	N/A (Mobile radar)	22m	Active (22/3/2015-)	N/A	C	Yes	Yes	This research radar is installed on the RV Investigator, an ocean research vessel. The radar collects data on research voyages, including trips to Antarctic waters, Heard Island and circumnavigations of Australia.
UQXPOL	N/A (Mobile radar)	N/A	Active (14/10/2014-)	Furuno WR-2100	X	Yes	Yes	This research radar is operated by the University of Queensland and has been involved with research to improve hail detection and hail size prediction algorithms, and also with research into bushfires and pyroconvection as part of a $1 million google.org philanthropic venture.
Monash University x-band	N/A (Mobile radar)	N/A	Active	Meteor 60DX	X	Yes	Yes	

== See also ==
=== Related articles ===
- NEXRAD
- Canadian weather radar network

=== External links ===
- "Official web site for BOM radars".
