= Marble Mountain Ski Resort =

Ski resort in Newfoundland and Labrador

Marble Mountain Resort

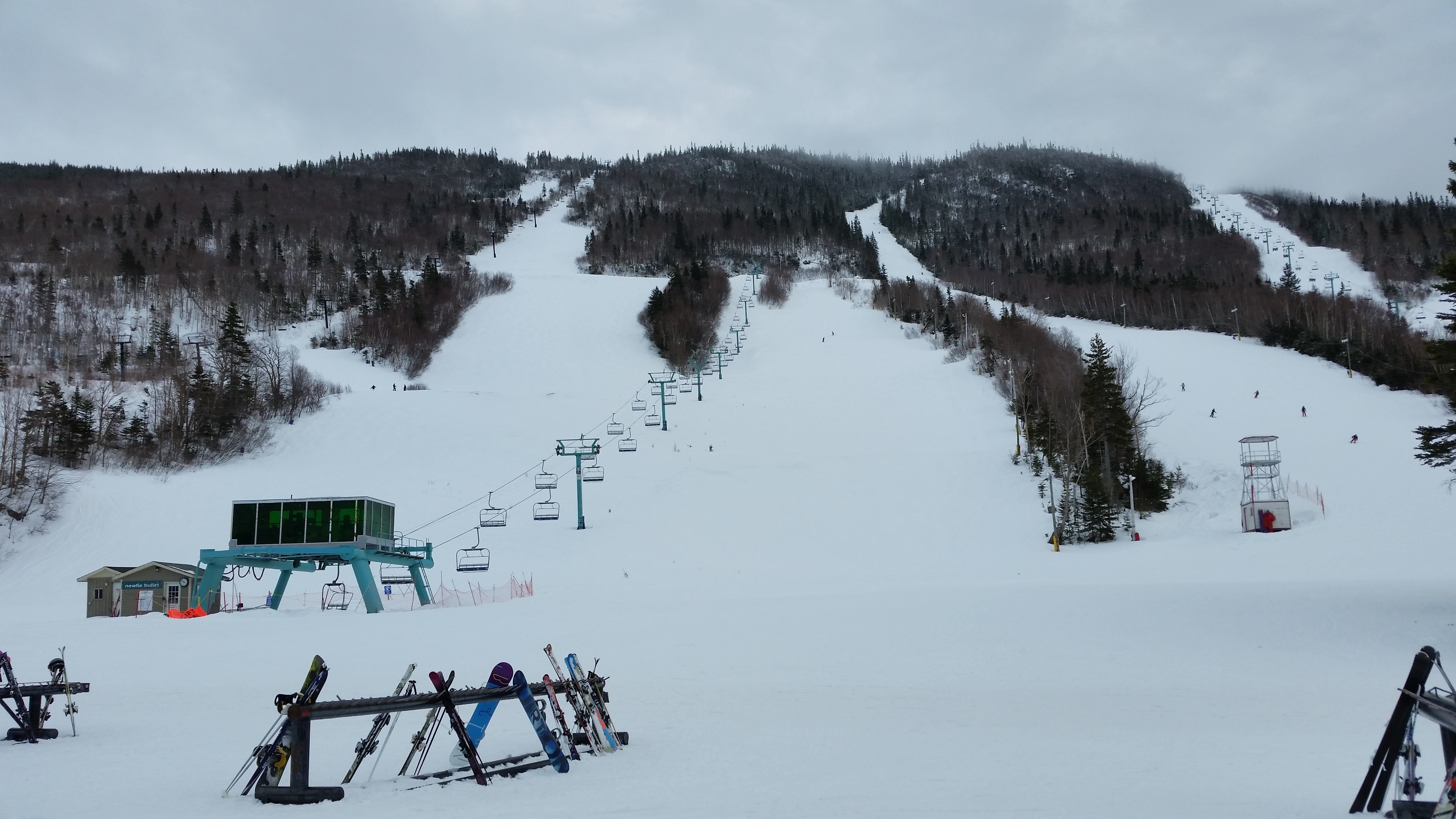
- Interactive map of Marble Mountain Resort
- Location: Steady Brook, Newfoundland; Canada
- Nearest city: Corner Brook
- Coordinates: 48°56′12″N 57°49′38″W
- Vertical: 536 m (1,759 ft)
- Top elevation: 546 m (1,791 ft)
- Base elevation: 10 m (33 ft)
- Skiable area: 225 acres (0.91 km^{2})
- Trails: 39; 5 – Easiest; 17 – More Difficult; 10 – Most Difficult; 6 – Expert
- Longest run: Country Road 4.5 km (3 mi)
- Lift system: 4 lifts: 1 high-speed quad chair; 2 fixed-grip quad chairs; 1 magic carpet
- Terrain parks: 2 – Terrain Park, 7 mogul runs
- Snowfall: 5m (16ft)/year
- Website: Ski Marble

Marble Mountain is a ski resort located in the town of Steady Brook, on the west coast of Newfoundland in the Long Range Mountains.

The resort is located on a series of steep ridges forming part of the southern side of the Humber River valley on Mount Musgrave at Steady Brook, approximately 7 km (4 mi) east of Corner Brook. As the name implies, marble is present; however, it forms only a minor part of the bedrock, which is mostly schist. The peak is named in honour of Sir Anthony Musgrave, a colonial governor of Newfoundland.

Lower elevations of Marble Mountain outside of the ski lanes are covered with a rich mixed forest of abundant balsam fir, white spruce, black spruce and white birch, with some red maple and mountain maple. At higher elevations, black spruce is often dominant and deciduous trees are less abundant.

Marble Mountain is the site of the largest alpine ski resort in Atlantic Canada. Environment Canada's doppler weather radar station "XME", part of the Canadian weather radar network is located near the resort at the summit of Mount Musgrave.

The Marble Mountain Ski Resort has an average of 5 m (16 ft) of snow each year, compared to Mont Tremblant's 3.65 m (12 ft). This produces a three-month ski season. In the winter of 2013/2014, the resort saw more than 21 feet of natural snowfall and in the 2014/2015 season, nearly 20 feet of natural snow fell. Marble Mountain was a venue for the 1999 Canada Winter Games hosted by Corner Brook.

Marble Mountain has the only detachable high speed quad lift in Atlantic Canada, the Lightning Express. It is 1,660 m (5,446 ft) in length and has a ride time of approximately 7 minutes.

On June 29, 2018, the provincial government announced that it would be seeking a request for proposals to divest the government of ownership of Marble Mountain. The resort has been operated by the provincial government since 1988 through the Marble Mountain Development Corporation. The ski hill receives an annual subsidy of close to $1 million.

As of late June 2022, moves were initiated to make Marble Mountain an all-season resort with more emphasis on summer recreation.

== Trails ==
Easy	Intermediate	Difficult	Very Difficult	Freestyle
5	17	10	6	2
Broadway (beginners area)	Steinbergs	Kruncher (m)	Macleod Nine (m)	Crocker's Run
Upalong	Ho Chi Minh Trail	Cruiser	Boomerang (m)	Hot Dog
Country Road	Old Sam	Blow Me Down (OMJ)	Humber View (m)
Little Heart's Ease	Marble Chute	Musgrave (m)	Autobahn (m)
Sleepy Hollow	Nature Trail	Tower 16	Ugly Stick (g)
	Chilliwack	Deep Bight
	Hansen's Run	Corkscrew
	Twister	Tuckamore Tangle (g)
	Knute Chute	Chicken's Way Out
	Bonavista	Cabot Straight
	Caribou Road
	Jigger
	Crooked Feeder
	L'anse Aux Meadows
	Random Passage
	Major's Path
	Langins Lane

- (m) – mogul runs
- (g) – gladed trail with trees

== Lifts ==
Lift Name	Length	Vertical	Type	Ride Time	Make	Build Year
Lightning Express	1,660m	519m	High Speed Detachable Quad	6 Mins	Leitner-Poma	2014
Black Mariah	1,106m	427m	Fixed Grip Quad	10 mins	Poma	1993
Newfie Bullet	473m	220m	Fixed Grip Quad	6 mins	Doppelmayr	1986
Magic Carpet	91m	28m	Surface Lift	2 mins	N/A	2009

== See also ==
- List of ski areas and resorts in Canada
- Weather radar on Marble Mountain
