= Canadian weather radar network =

Weather radars used by the Environment and Climate Change Canada

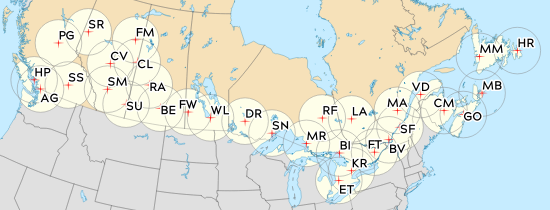
- Location of the weather radars in Canada.
- Country of origin: Canada
- Manufacturer: various
- No. built: 33
- Type: S bands

The Canadian weather radar network consists of 33 weather radars spanning Canada's most populated regions. Their primary purpose is the early detection of precipitation, its motion and the threat it poses to life and property.

Each had until 2018 a range of 256 km (159 mi) in radius around the site to detect reflectivity, 3 angles with a range of 128 km (80 mi), for detecting velocity pattern (Doppler effect), and an extra long range up to 240 km (150 mi) at low elevation angle but strongly folded or aliased (where the maximum unambiguous velocity interval (±Vmax) is less than the full range of velocities being measured which leads to some being displayed with the wrong values).

The renewal of the network, from 2018 to 2023, with new S-Band radars brings these numbers respectively to 300 km (190 mi) for reflectivity and 240 km (150 mi) for full Doppler coverage. Furthermore, the new radars are dual-polarized which means precipitation type can be estimated directly. Starting in June 2021, some of the radars' ranges will be extended to 400 km (250 mi) in the lowest angle of reflectivity data. The range extensions are intended to provide forecasters at the Meteorological Service of Canada, part of Environment and Climate Change Canada, with radar information while nearby radars are being replaced as part of the renewal. Starting on 29 June 2022, a pilot project allowed external users access to the raw data, possibly including the 400 km data.

== History ==
Research in weather radars in Canada began at the end of the Second World War with "Project Stormy Weather". After the war, J.S. Marshall continued at McGill University the work with the "Stormy Weather Group". The Canadian network was thus gradually formed and by 1997, there were 19 weather radars of two kinds across the country: 18 five centimeter wavelength (C-Band) radars and 1 ten centimeter wavelength (S-Band) at McGill, all of the radars detected reflectivity but only Carvel (Edmonton), King City (Toronto) and McGill (Montreal) were equipped with Doppler capabilities.

Environment Canada received approval in 1998 to upgrade the network to Doppler standard and to add 12 more radars with the operational characteristics coming from King City weather radar station (CWKR), the research radar of Environment Canada. However, the McGill radar (at the J. S. Marshall Radar Observatory), while being part of the network, was owned by McGill University. It was a research as well as an operational radar and was modified independently. The Jimmy Lake and Lac Castor stations are owned and operated by the Department of Defense (DND), these are also part of the network.

In February 2017, the Minister of Environment and Climate Change, Catherine McKenna, announced the signature of a $83‑million contract with Selex ES (ex-subsidiary of Leonardo S.p.A. now marketed under Leonardo Electronics) to buy 20 new radars with the most modern technology available (S band and double polarized) to update the network. with the contract containing options to replace all radars in the Canadian Weather Radar Network, by March 31, 2023. The first radar was installed in Radisson, SK in the fall of 2017. The second radar was installed in the summer of 2018 at Blainville in the Montreal region to replace the aging McGill radar (WMN). 2018 also saw replacement radars at Foxwarren MB, Timmins ON (near Smooth Rock Falls), and Spirit River AB and 19 of the new radars were in place by the end of 2020 with the rest being replaced sequentially by 2023. An additional radar will be installed in the Lower Athabasca region in Alberta. In June 2021, to ensure continuity of radar coverage in some areas while radars are being replaced, several of the radars had their ranges extended to 400 km (250 mi) in the lowest angle of reflectivity data. Such areas include the Edmonton area and the southwestern region of Newfoundland.

== Characteristics before 2018 ==
- McGill radar (at the J. S. Marshall Radar Observatory):
  - 9 metre (30 feet) diameter antenna.
  - Uses a klystron to produce a wavelength signal of 10 cm. (S-Band)
  - Doppler since 1993 and dual polarization was added in 1999.
- King City weather radar station
  - This research radar is essentially a WSR-98A (see below) upgraded with dual polarization capability in 2004.
- The rest of the network:
  - The existing radars have antennas from two manufacturers: Enterprise Electronics Corporation (EEC) and Raytheon.
  - some of the existing radars have antennas produced by Andrew Canada. With a diameter almost double the old ones; resolutions improved by the same amount.
  - Use 5.6 cm wavelength emitting magnetrons. (C-Band)
  - Process received reflectivity and Doppler data with Sigmet Radar Data Systems, now a part of Vaisala Oyj.
  - Each radar in the network will thus be called a WSR-98E, WSR-98R or WSR-98A for Weather Surveillance Radar - 1998 (for the year of the start of the program) and the first letter of the manufacturer of the Pedestal/Antenna (Enterprise, Raytheon or Andrew).
  - Antennas of 3.6 metres in diameter for the pre-1998 vintage radars and 6.1 m for the new ones.
  - Pulse length and pulse repetition frequency adjustable. Pulse length 0.8,1.6 and 2.0$\mu$s. Pulse repetition frequency (PRF) 250 Hz and Dual PRF (Doppler Mode) 1190/1200 Hz.
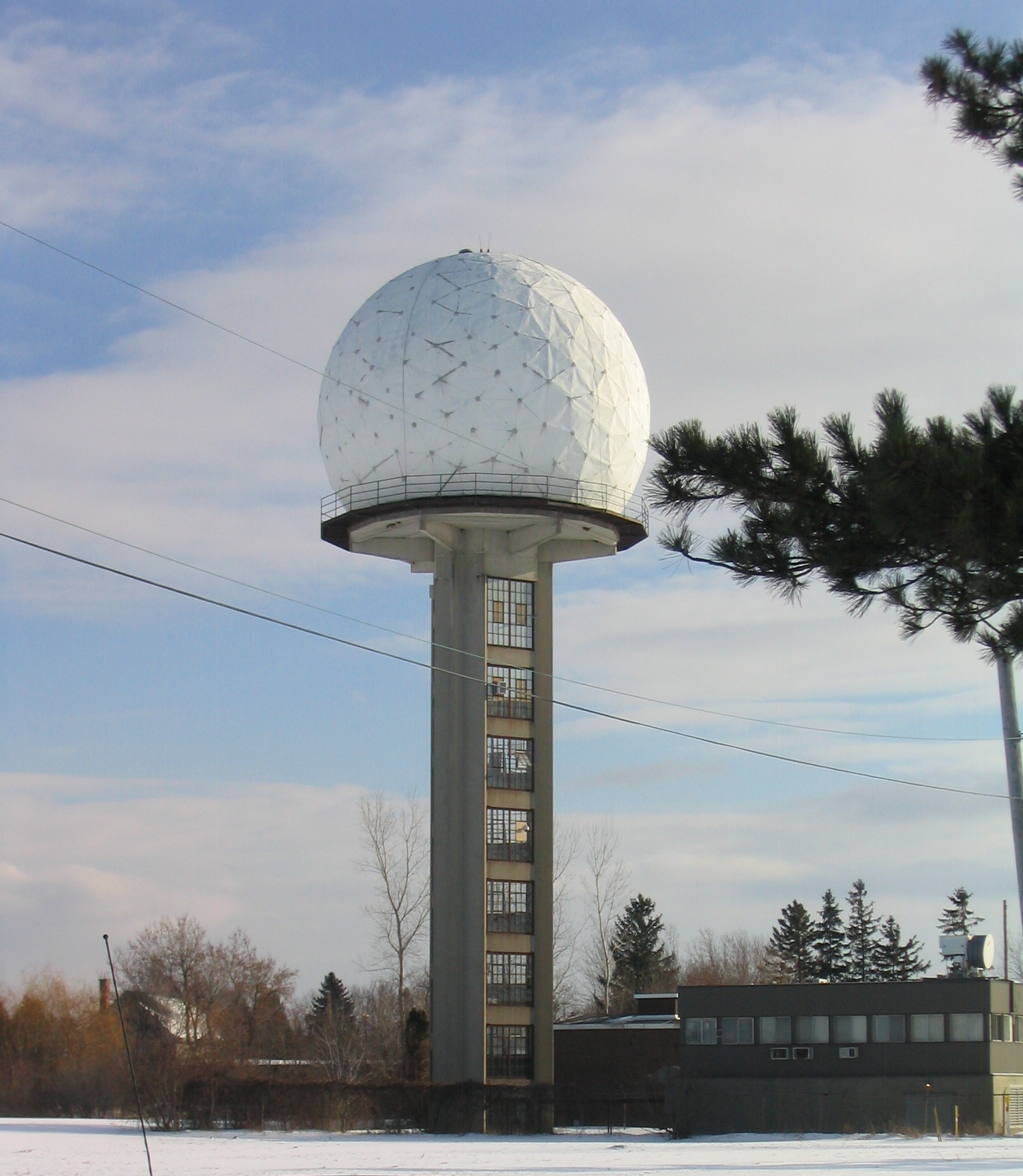
Tower and radome of McGill radar (CWMN).

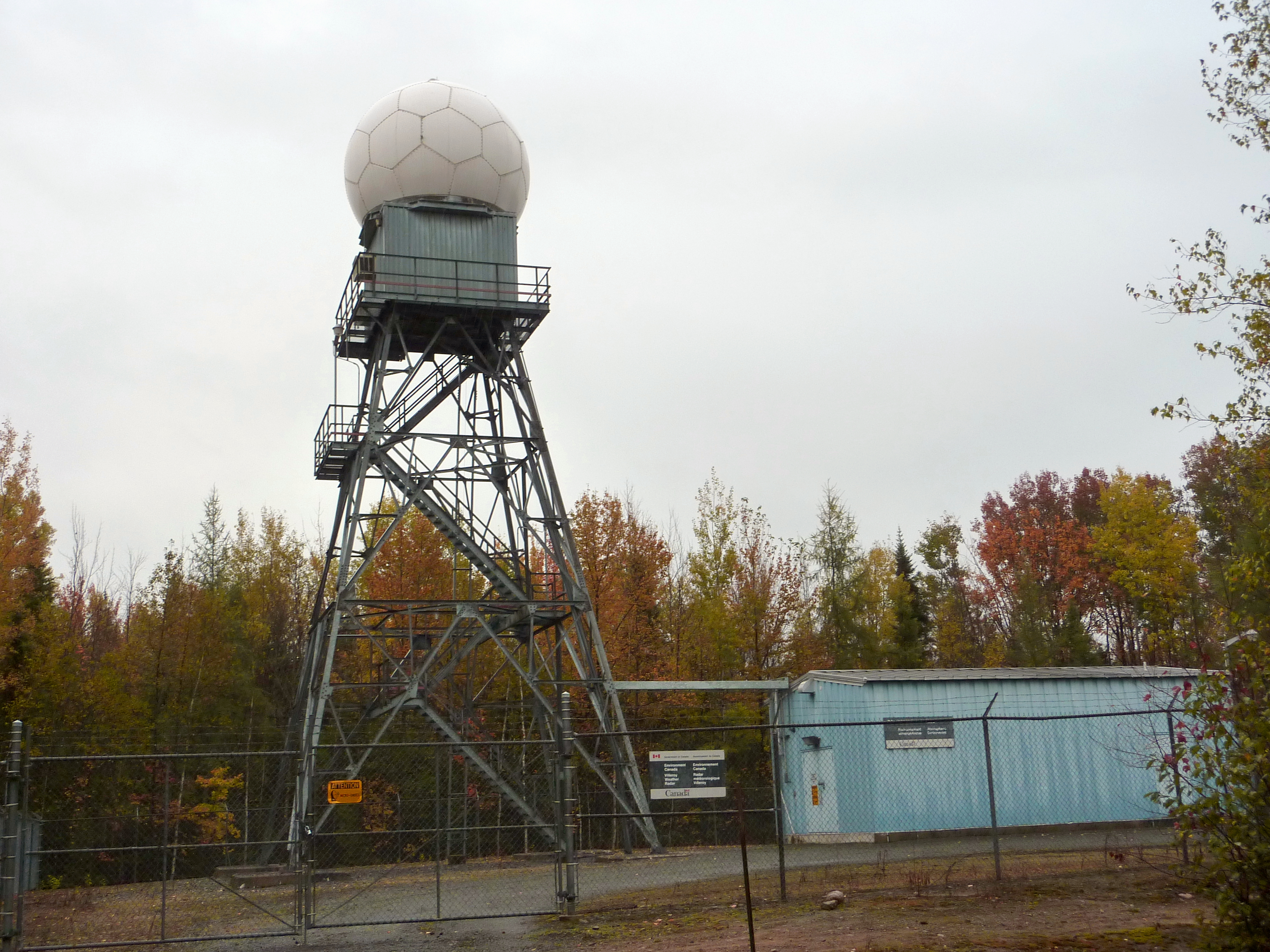
Villeroy radar (a WSR-98E), 75 km southwest of Quebec City : tower and radome to the left, transmitter and receiver in the building on the right.

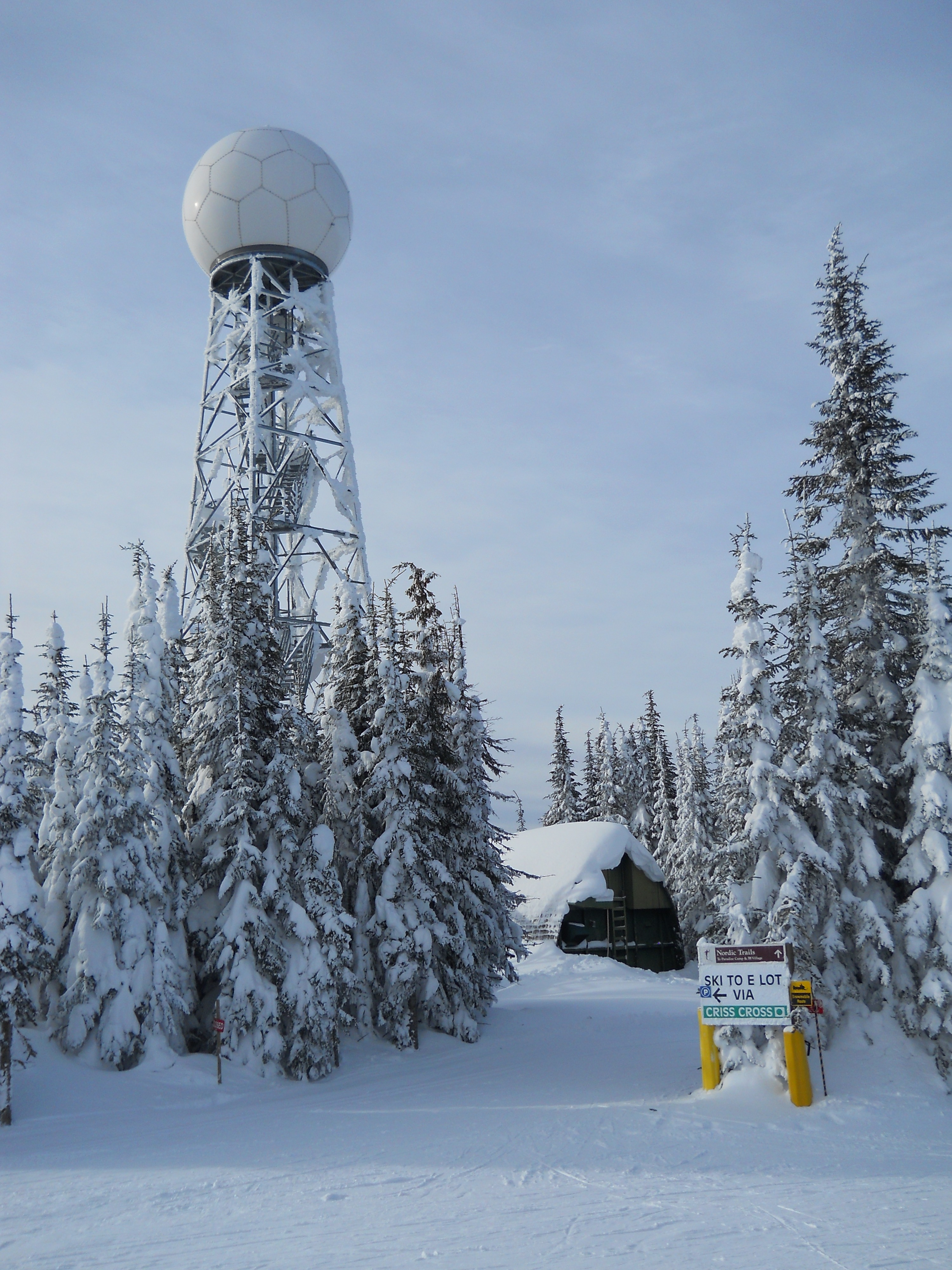
Station CXSS (a WSR-98A) at Silver Star Mountain.

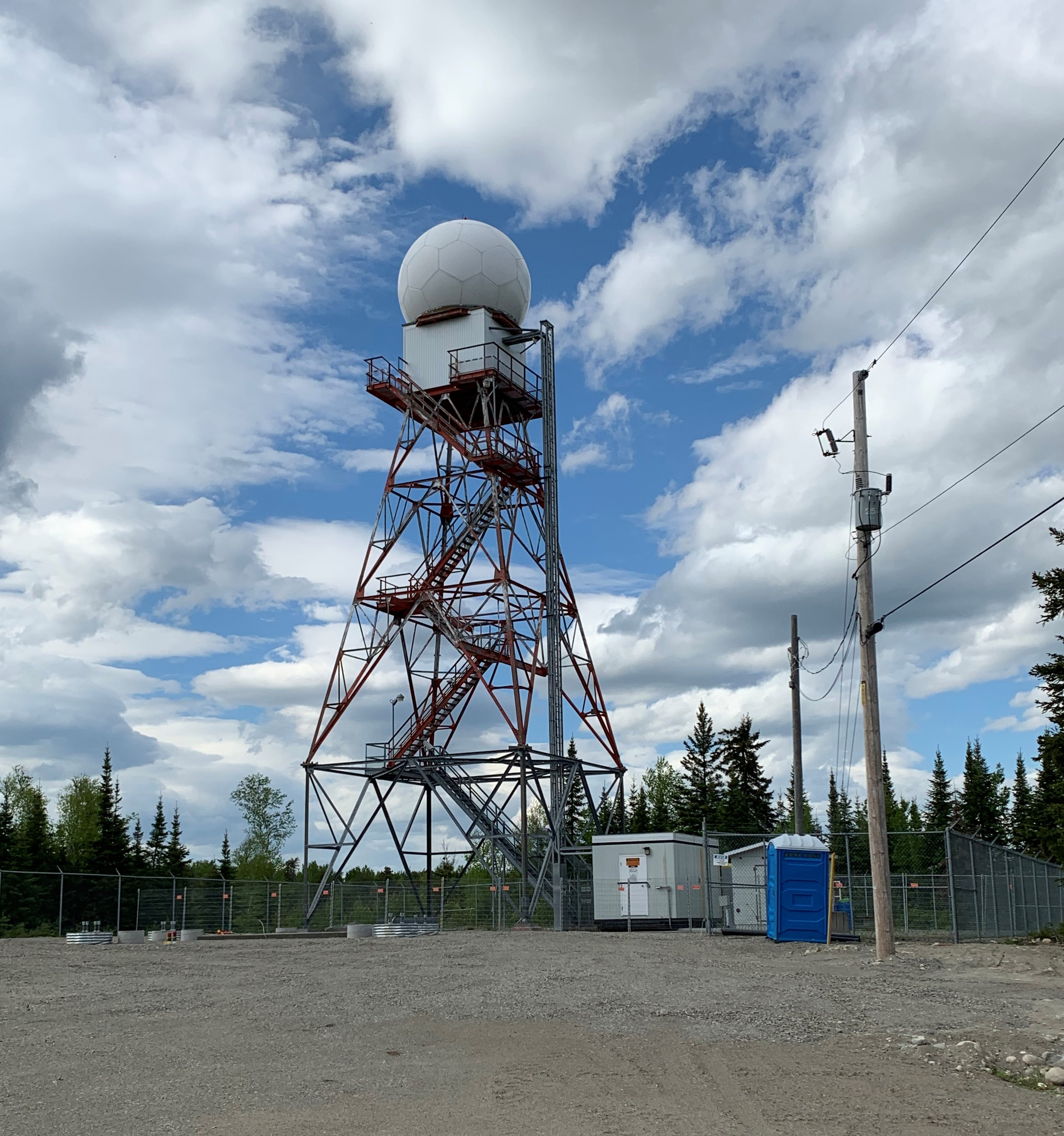
Station CXLA, a WSR-98R, of Landrienne in June 2019 with the base of its replacement in front.

== Scanning strategy ==
Because the network is using C band radars, compromises had to be used (see Doppler dilemma) between maximum reflectivity range and maximum non ambiguous velocities. The actual scanning strategy (2006) is divided in two separate scans over 10 minutes:

- Conventional cycle: 24 elevation angles scanned in 5 minutes to obtain a tri-dimensional view of the atmosphere within 256 km of the radar in reflectivity.
- Doppler cycle: 4 angles scanned in reflectivity and velocities, the first three in a range of 128 km and the last within 256 km. This cycle is used to locate possible small scale rotation and shear in the wind pattern as well as the large scale circulation. The velocity data also help to filter artifacts in the reflectivity such as ground echos.

The McGill radar uses a S-band transmitter instead of a C-band transmitter to acquire reflectivities and velocities during each of its 24 elevation angles with the same 5 minute cycle time.

== Modernization project ==
Environment and Climate Change Canada received the funding from the Treasury Board in 2011 to undergo a major modernization project called 'WES (Weather and Environmental Services) Renewal' to upgrade to dual polarization all Canadian Radars in two separate five year plans. Complete network stabilization and systemic problems resolution were also part of this major effort by Environment and Climate Change Canada. The first five years concentrated on the upgrading and stabilizing of the existing radars. Then all Canadian weather radars will be replaced with a dual polarization S-band radar between 2017 and 2023. A new radar, owned and operated by ECCC, has been installed in Blainville (near Montreal) to replace the use of the McGill radar. As well, a new radar will be installed in the Lower Athabasca area.

The new radars are the Leonardo METEOR 1700S (formerly marketed by Selex ES) which is fully Doppler and dual polarized:

- Transmitter type: Klystron
- Frequency : 2.7 - 2.9 GHz
- Pulse repetition frequency (PRF): 250 – 2000 Hz
- Pulse length (τ): 0.4 μs ... 4.5 μs
- Peak power: 750 kW
- Doppler range: 240 km
- Reflectivity normal range: 300 km
- maximum range: 600 km
- Velocity resolution : ± 146 m/s
- Antenna diameter: 8.5 m
- Beamwidth : < 1°
- Rotation: 6 min^{−1}
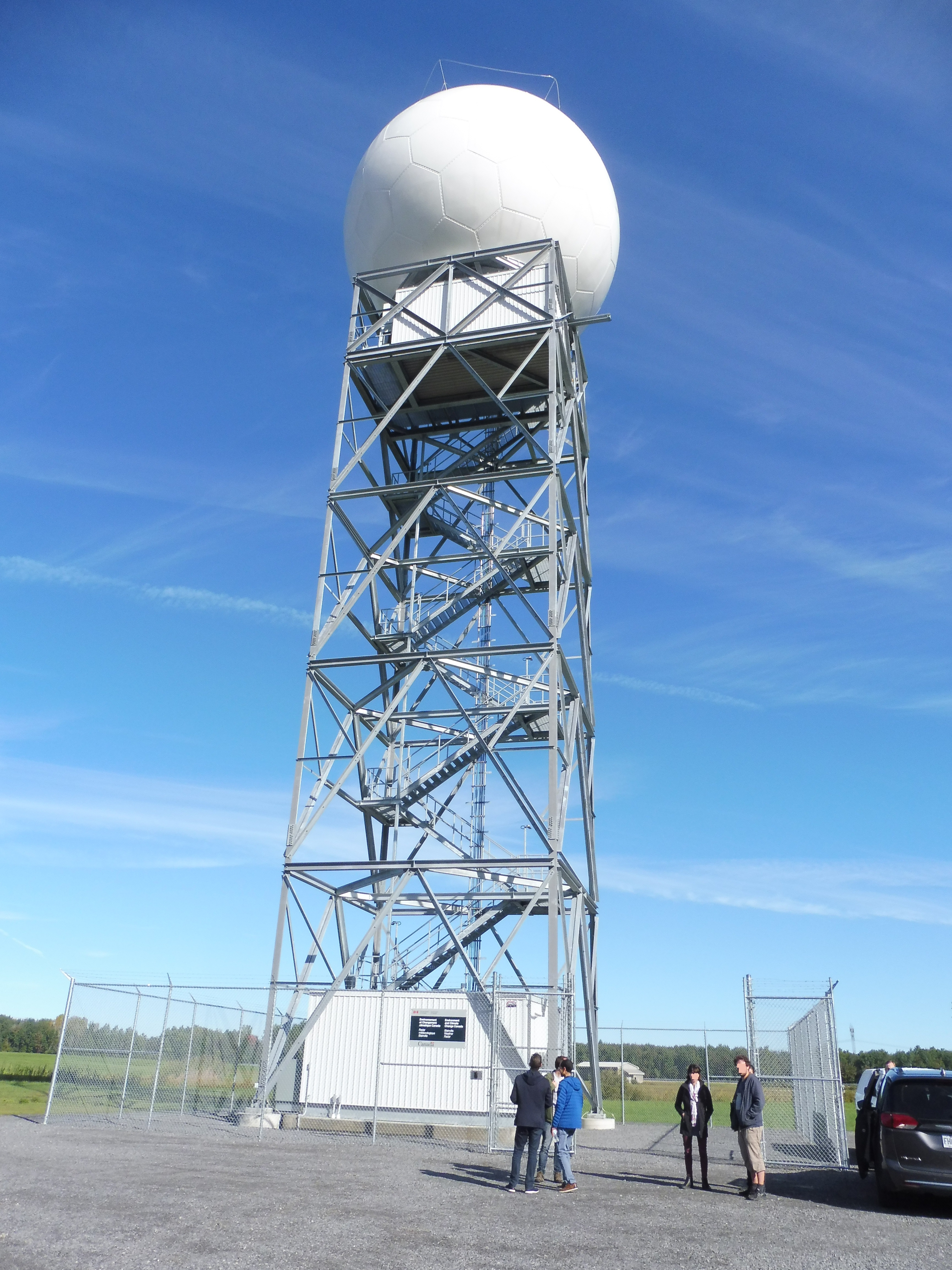
New METEOR 1700S in Blainville, Quebec.

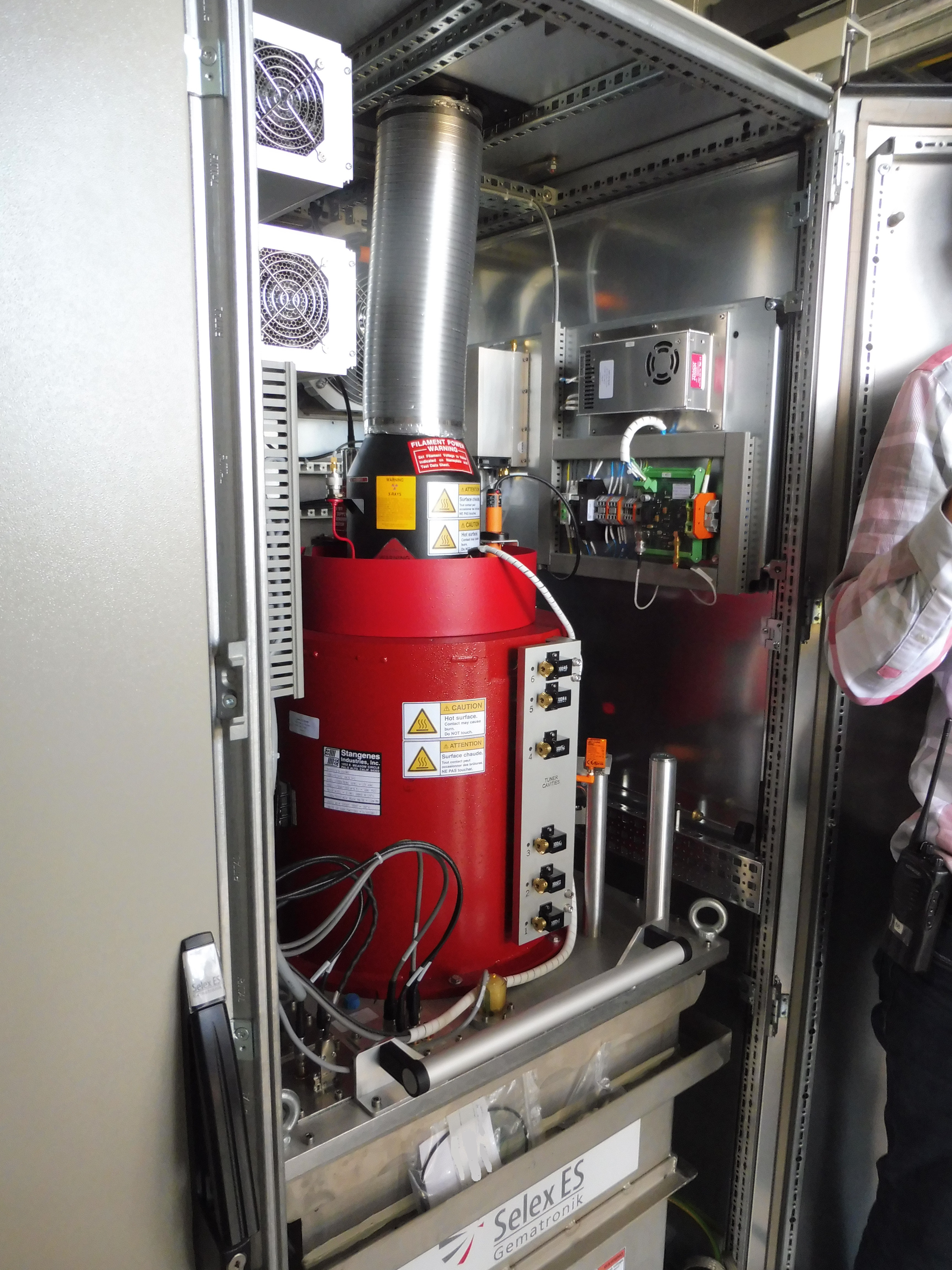
Transmitter's klystron.

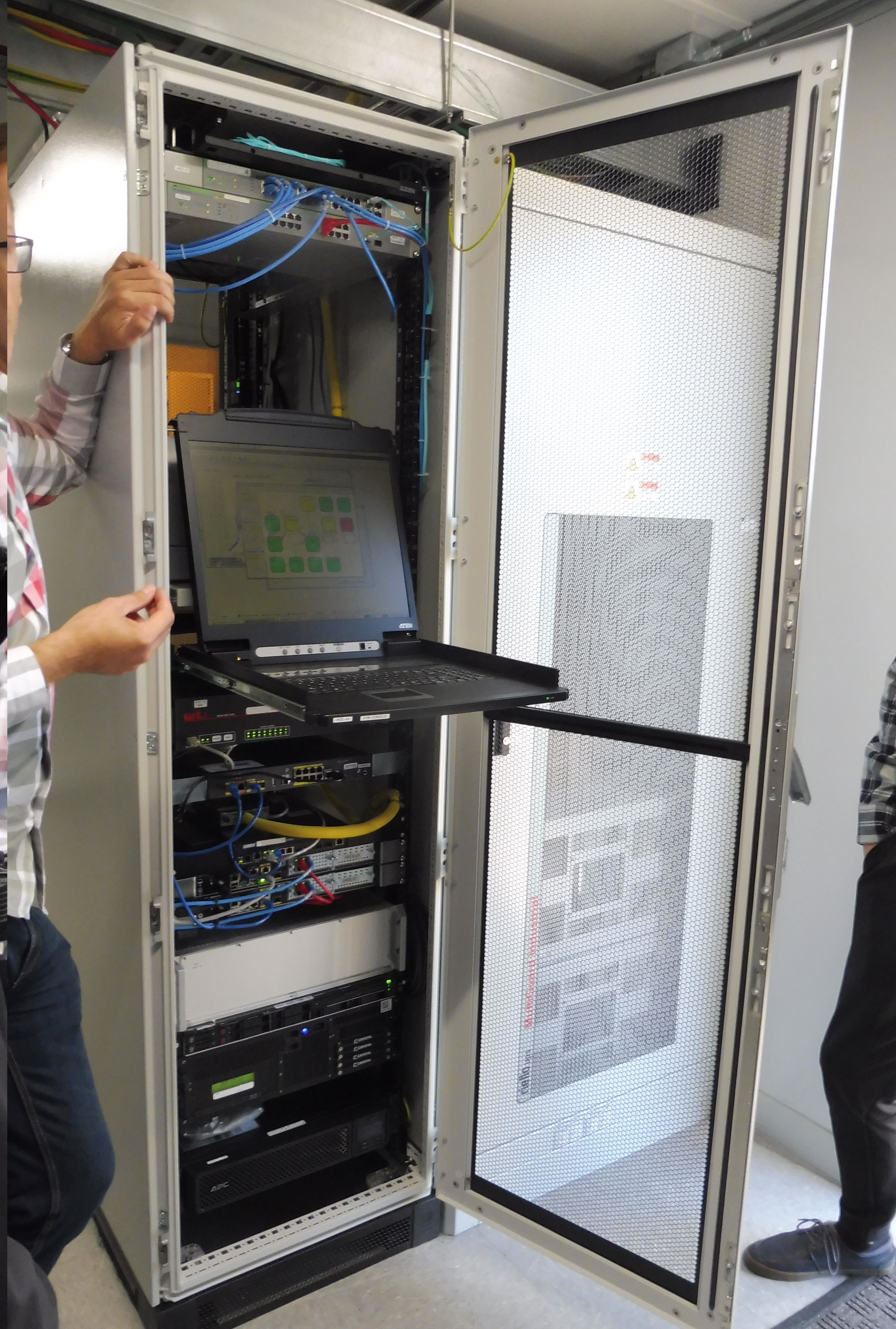
Radar processor.

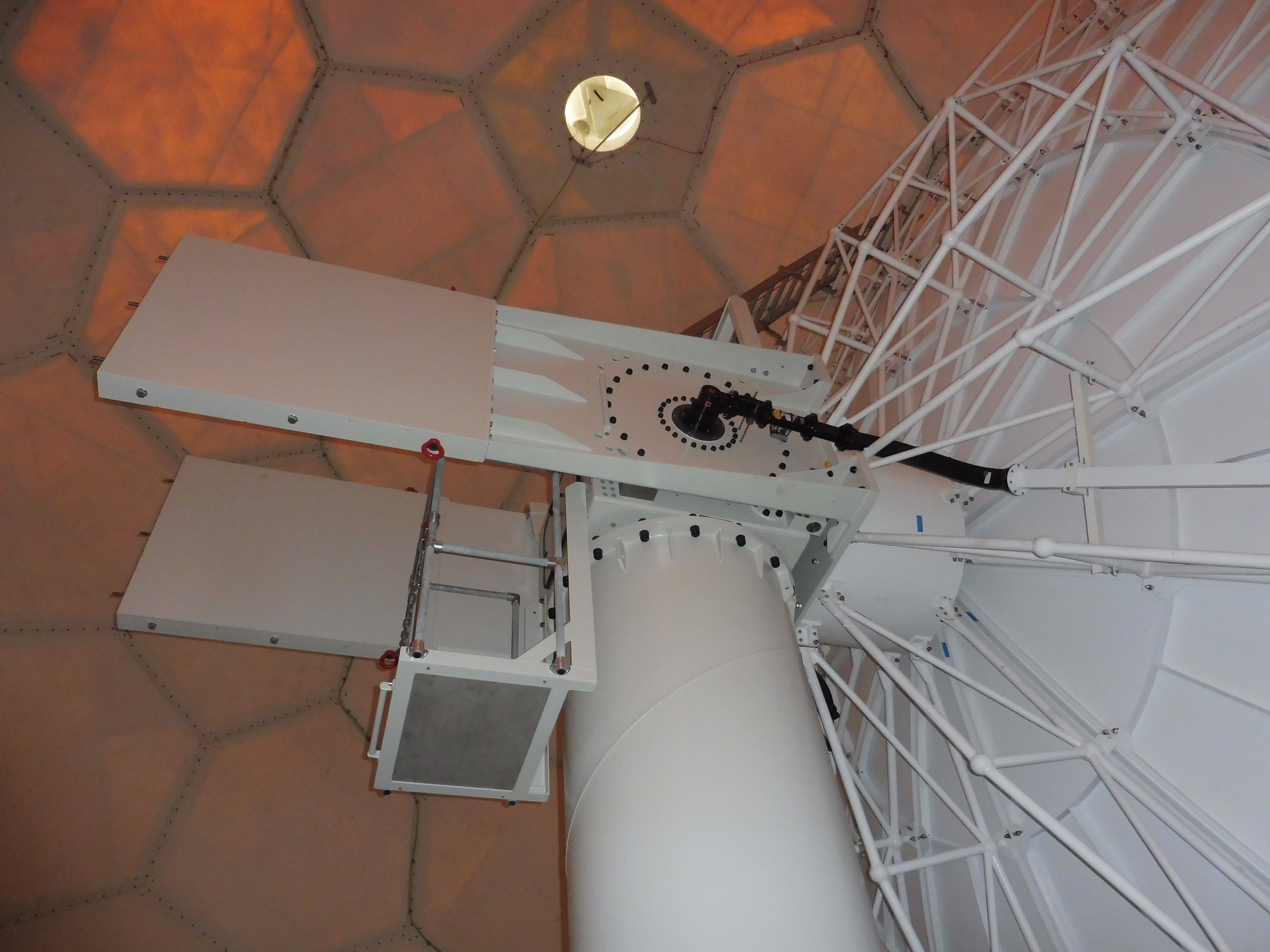
Antenna and pedestal.

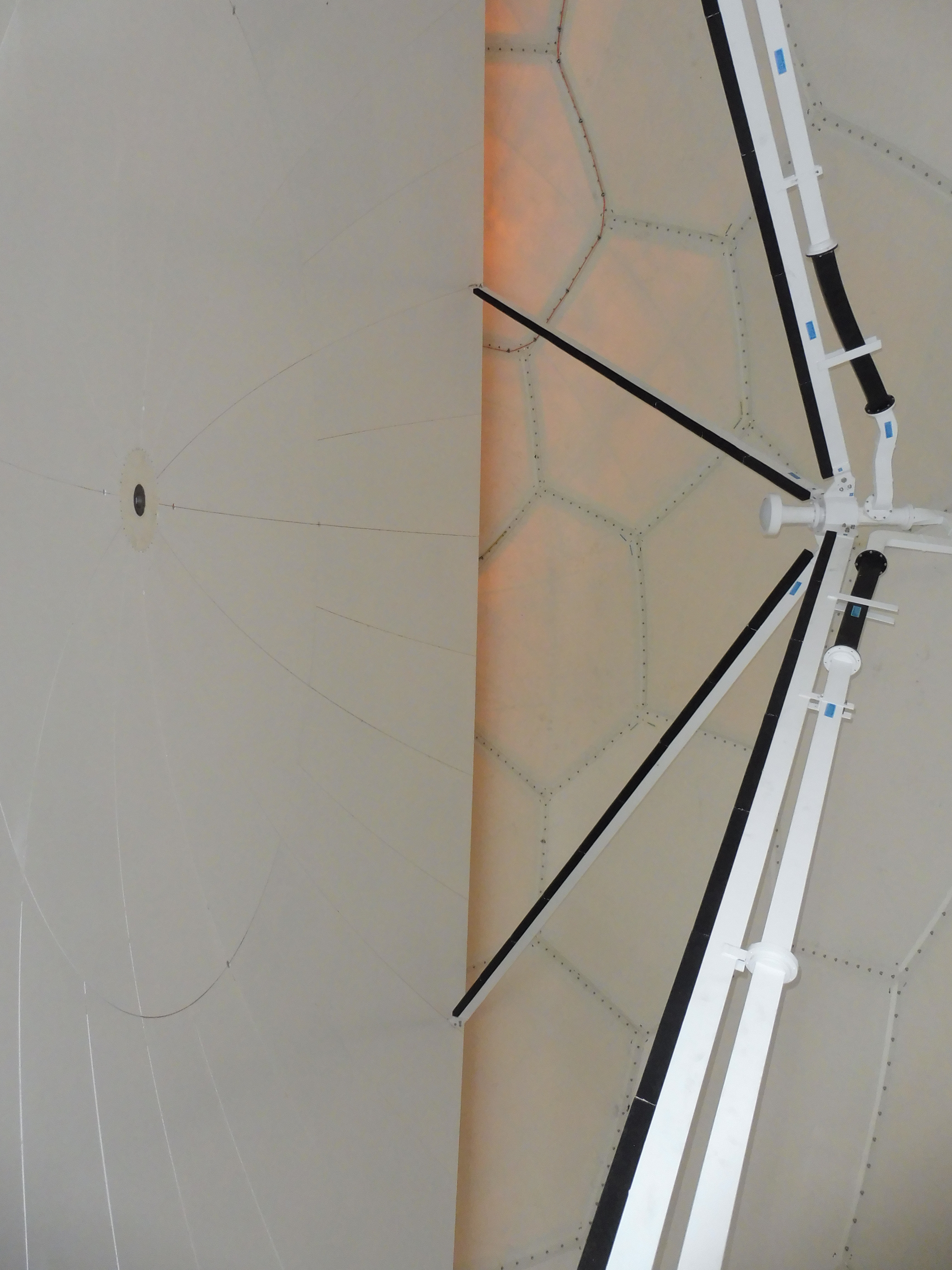
Antenna and feed horn.

These new S-Band radars offer more flexibility over the previous C-Band radars. The scanning strategy of 17 angles scanned in 6 minutes, and the new dual-polarization feature provide:

- Dual polarization will permit to better differentiate the type of precipitation (rain, snow, hail and freezing rain), biological and non-biological targets such as birds, insects, chaff, and tornado debris signature.
- The radial velocity range (Doppler range) will be extended to 240 kilometres (150 mi), from 120 kilometres (75 mi), permitting an improved lead time in weather warnings issuance and a better overlap of radar coverage with other nearby radars.

Starting on June 15, 2021, some of the S-band radars have a modification of the scanning strategy : a low level angle of 0.3 degree will use a low PRF to extend its range to 400 km in reflectivity while a mid-level angle will be eliminated in the cycle in order to help in radar coverage.

== List of radars ==
The first modernization process began in the fall of 1998 with the opening of Bethune radar and ended in 2004 with the one in Timmins. The replacement of C-band 250 kW Magnetron single-pol radars with S-band 1MW Klystron dual-pol radars began in 2017 with the Radisson site and ended in 2023 with the Halfmoon Peak site.

Canadian Weather Radar Network
Site	Location	Province	Coordinates	ID/call sign	Band	Type	Callsign meaning	Notes
Aldergrove	Vancouver	British Columbia	49.01662°N 122.48698°W	CASAG	S	METEOR 1700S	Aldergrove	New radar METEOR 1700S operational since September 7, 2021, replacing C-band CWUJ (WSR-98E).
Bethune	Regina	Saskatchewan	50.57118°N 105.18290°W	CASBE	S	METEOR 1700S	Bethune	New radar commissioned in August 2019 replacing 98A (XBE). A temporary mobile X-band radar was deployed during the upgrade.
Blainville	Montréal	Québec	45.70634°N 73.85852°W	CASBV	S	METEOR 1700S	Blainville	New radar commissioned at the end of September 2018, replacing McGill radar (CWMN).
Britt	Georgian Bay	Ontario	45.79317°N 80.53385°W	CASBI	S	METEOR 1700S	Britt	New radar CASBI became operational on November 22, 2021, replacing the CWBI C-Band (WSR-98A).
Carvel	Edmonton	Alberta	53.56056°N 114.14495°W	CASCV	S	METEOR 1700S	Carvel	The new radar S-Band replace CWHK (WSR-98E) since January 26, 2022
Chipman	Central New Brunswick	New Brunswick	46.22232°N 65.69924°W	CASCM	S	METEOR 1700S	Chipman	New radar commissioned in September 2019 replacing 98E (XNC)
Cold Lake	NW Saskatchewan / NE Alberta	Alberta	54.3785°N 110.061378°W	CASCL	S	METEOR 1700S	Cold Lake	New radar commissioned on October 27, 2021, replacing the C-band 98E at Jimmy Lake (CWHN).
Dryden	Western Ontario	Ontario	49.85823°N 92.79698°W	CASDR	S	METEOR 1700S	Dryden	Replaced C-Band CXDR on September 3, in 2020.
Egbert (near Barrie)	Southern Ontario	Ontario	44.2305662°N 79.7803300°W	CASTS	S	METEOR 1700S	N/A	New radar site for research, training, and tests of material and software. It will be built at the Centre for Atmospheric Research Experiments (CERA).
Exeter	Southwestern Ontario	Ontario	43.37243°N 81.38070°W	CASET	S	METEOR 1700S	Exeter	New radar commissioned in November 2019 replacing 98A (WSO)
Fort McMurray	Northeastern Alberta	Alberta	56.375642°N 111.215177°W	CASFM	S	METEOR 1700S	Fort McMurray	New radar site commissioned on September 26, 2022, around 40 km South of Fort McMurray.
Foxwarren	Eastern Saskatchewan/Western Manitoba	Manitoba	50.54887°N 101.08570°W	CASFW	S	METEOR 1700S	Foxwarren	Radar commissioned in September 2018, replacing CXFW, a C-band radar. A temporary mobile X-band radar was deployed during the upgrade until October 31, 2018.
Franktown	Eastern Ontario	Ontario	45.04101°N 76.11617°W	CASFT	S	METEOR 1700S	Franktown	Radar commissioned in August 2021, replacing CXFT, a C-band radar.
Gore	Central Hants County	Nova Scotia	45.09850°N 63.70433°W	CASGO	S	METEOR 1700S	Gore	New radar METEOR 1700S operational since August 30, 2021, replacing C-band CXGO (WSR-98A).
Halfmoon Peak	Sechelt	British Columbia	49.527017°N 123.853583°W	CASHP	S	METEOR 1700S	Halfmoon Peak	New radar site entered into service on August 21, 2023. This site replaces Mt Sicker (CXSI). Last S-band radar to be installed as part of the 2017-2023 network renewal.
Holyrood	Eastern Newfoundland	Newfoundland and Labrador	47.32644°N 53.12658°W	CASHR	S	METEOR 1700S	Holyrood	Commissioned on October 13, 2020. Replaced the C-band (98E) CWTP.
King City	Southern Ontario	Ontario	43.96393°N 79.57388°W	CASKR	S	METEOR 1700S	King City Radar	Commissioned on June 28, 2021, to replace the C-band (98A) CWKR.
Landrienne	Amos	Quebec	48.55136°N 77.80809°W	CASLA	S	METEOR 1700S	Landrienne Amos	Radar commissioned in October 2019, replacing the previous 98R CXLA C-band radar.
Marble Mountain	Western Newfoundland	Newfoundland and Labrador	48.93028°N 57.83417°W	CASMM	S	METEOR 1700S	Marble Mountain	Radar commissioned on October 31, 2022, replacing the previous 98A CXME C-band radar.
Marion Bridge	Southeastern Cape Breton County	Nova Scotia	45.94972°N 60.20521°W	CASMB	S	METEOR 1700S	Marion Bridge	Radar commissioned in October 2019, replacing the previous CXMB C-band radar.
Mont Apica	Saguenay–Lac-Saint-Jean	Québec	47.977908°N 71.430833°W	CASMA	S	METEOR 1700S	Mont-Apica	New site commissioned January 23, 2023 and operational since February 6. It is replacing CWMB Lac Castor (98E C-band).
Montreal River	Sault Ste Marie	Ontario	47.24773°N 84.59652°W	CASMR	S	METEOR 1700S	Montreal River	Radar commissioned in November 2019, replacing the previous 98E WGJ C-band radar.
Mount Silver Star	Vernon	British Columbia	50.36950°N 119.06436°W	CASSS	S	METEOR 1700S	Silver Star	New radar METEOR, replacing CXSS (WSR-98A), operational since December 14, 2022.
Prince George	Northern B.C.	British Columbia	53.61308°N 122.95441°W	CASPG	S	METEOR 1700S	Prince George	New METEOR 1700S radar replaced the C-Band CXPG (WSR-98R) on December 19, 2022.
Radisson	Saskatoon	Saskatchewan	52.52048°N 107.44269°W	CASRA	S	METEOR 1700S	Radisson	Radar commissioned in February 2018, replacing CXRA, a C-band radar.
Sainte-Françoise/ (Villeroy)	Southwest of Quebec City	Quebec	46.449556°N 71.913831°W	CASSF	S	METEOR 1700S	Sainte-Françoise	Commissioned in November 2020, replacing the C-Band CWVY with no change of site but change of name from Villeroy to Sainte-Françoise, a closer geographical point.
Schuler	Medicine Hat	Alberta	50.31250°N 110.19556°W	CASSU	S	METEOR 1700S	Schuler	Replaced the C-Band CXBU on September 8, 2020.
Smooth Rock Falls	Northeastern Ontario	Ontario	49.28146°N 81.79406°W	CASRF	S	METEOR 1700S	Smooth Rock Falls (The S in CASRF is for S-Band)	Initially known as Timmins CXTI, then Northeast Ontario. Finally Smooth Rock Falls with the dual polarization upgrade Commissioned in 2018/10.
Spirit River	Grande Prairie	Alberta	55.69494°N 119.23043°W	CASSR	S	METEOR 1700S	Spirit River	This radar was replaced in 2018 and commissioned in Feb 2019 replacing CWWW a C-band radar that had been in operation since 2001/10
Strathmore	Calgary	Alberta	51.20613°N 113.39937°W	CASSM	S	METEOR 1700S	Strathmore	Radar commissioned in November 2019, replacing the previous 98A (XSM) C-band radar. A temporary mobile X-band radar was deployed during the upgrade.
Superior West	Shuniah	Ontario	48.595876°N 89.100129°W	CASSN	S	METEOR 1700S	ShuNiah	New radar site replacing Lasseter Lake (CXNI) WSR-98E, operational since July 17, 2023.
Val d'Irène	Lower St. Lawrence	Quebec	48.48028°N 67.60111°W	CASVD	S	METEOR 1700S	Val d'Irène	Replaced the C-Band CAXM (98A) radar. Commissioned on November 2, 2020.
Woodlands	Winnipeg	Manitoba	50.15389°N 97.77833°W	CASWL	S	METEOR 1700S	Woodlands	Replaced the C-band (98A) CXWL on October 19, 2020. A temporary mobile X-band radar was deployed at St. Andrews Airport during the upgrade.

=== Decommissioned sites ===
Decommissioned sites of the Canadian Weather Radar Network
Site	Location	Province	Coordinates	ID/call sign	Band	Type	Callsign meaning	Notes
Lac Castor	Saguenay River	Quebec	48.57581°N 70.66784°W	CWMB	C	98E		Commissioned in February 1999, it was replaced by a new METEOR 1700S at a new site (Mont Apica). The latter is operational since February 6, 2023. On June 1, 2023, the Meteorological Service of Canada announced that the Lac Castor radar has been permanently deactivated.
Jimmy Lake	NW Saskatchewan/NE Alberta	Saskatchewan	54.91319°N 109.95992°W	CWHN	C	98E		Replaced by a new METEOR 1700S southeast of Cold Lake (ID CASCL - 54.3785°N 110.0625°W) since October 27, 2021 and decommissioned since January 20, 2022.
Superior West	Lasseter Lake	Ontario	48.85352°N 89.12150°W	CXNI	C	98E	Nipigon	Replaced by Shuniah S band radar since July 2023.
McGill	Montreal	Quebec	45.42416°N 73.93735°W	CWMN	S	--	Montreal	commissioned September 1968, decommissioned October 3, 2018, and replaced by the Blainville radar.
Mount Sicker	Victoria	British Columbia	48.86099°N 123.75654°W	CXSI	C	98A	Mount Sicker	Suffered major hardware failure in November 2017, decommissioned on December 6, 2018. S-band replacement installed in 2023 on an alternate site at Halfmoon Peak.

== See also ==
=== Related article ===
- NEXRAD, the weather radar network in the United States
- Australian Weather Radars

=== Bibliography ===
- Laramée, Sylvain; Li, Qian; Wong, Pat; Savard, Sylvain; Leibiuk, Peter; Brady, Steven; Czepita, Rick; Nasr, Hamid; Benko, Todd; Romaniuk, Michael; Abt, Mark; Wong, Ingrid (October 7, 2019). "Replacement of the Canadian Weather Radar Network". CMOS Bulletin. 47 (5). Canadian Meteorological and Oceanographic Society.
