= St. Judes, Newfoundland and Labrador =

St. Judes
- Local service district / designated place
- Location of St. Judes St. Judes (Canada)
- Coordinates: 49.142°N 57.44°W
- Country: Canada
- Province: Newfoundland and Labrador
- Region: Newfoundland
- Census division: 5
- Census subdivision: A

Government
  - Type: Unincorporated

Area
  - Land: 13.64 km^{2} (5.27 sq mi)

Population (2016)
  - Total: 214
- Time zone: UTC−03:30 (NST)
  - Summer (DST): UTC−02:30 (NDT)
- Area code: 709

St. Judes is a local service district and designated place in the Canadian province of Newfoundland and Labrador.

== Geography ==
St. Judes is in Newfoundland within Subdivision A of Division No. 5.

== Demographics ==
As a designated place in the 2016 Census of Population conducted by Statistics Canada, St. Judes recorded a population of 214 living in 81 of its 98 total private dwellings, a change of 6.5% from its 2011 population of 201. With a land area of 13.64 km^{2} (5.27 sq mi), it had a population density of 15.7/km^{2} (40.6/sq mi) in 2016.

== Government ==
St. Judes is a local service district (LSD) that is governed by a committee responsible for the provision of certain services to the community. The chair of the LSD committee is Christopher Young.

== See also ==
- List of communities in Newfoundland and Labrador
- List of designated places in Newfoundland and Labrador
- List of local service districts in Newfoundland and Labrador
