= Deer Lake, Newfoundland and Labrador =

Deer Lake
- Town
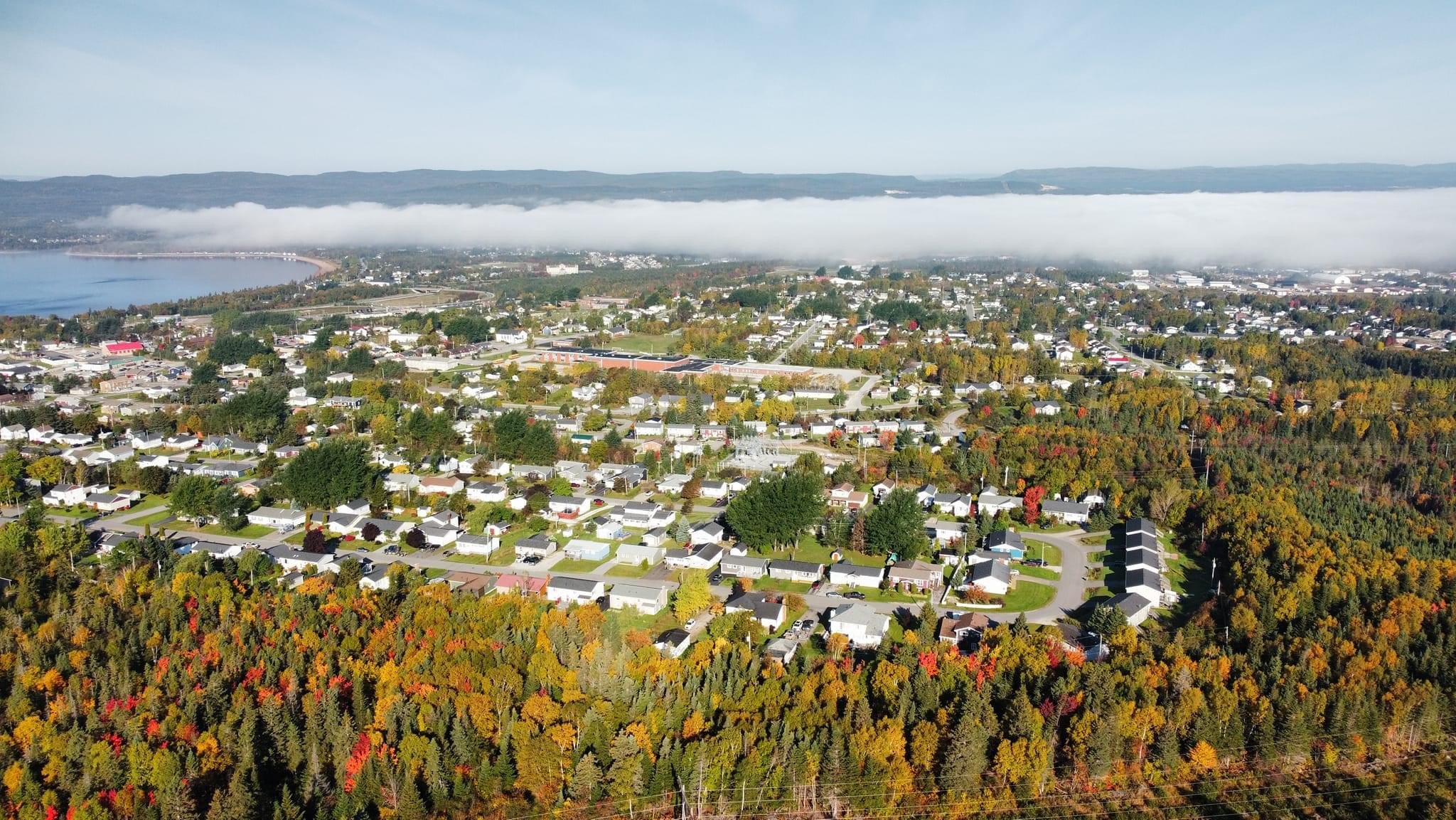
- Deer Lake seen from above.

- Seal

- Location of Deer Lake in Newfoundland Deer Lake (Canada)
- Coordinates: 49°11′42″N 57°23′23″W
- Country: Canada
- Province: Newfoundland and Labrador
- Census division: 5
- Settled: 1864
- Incorporated: 1950

Government
  - Mayor: Dean Ball
  - MHA: Mike Goosney
  - MP: Carol Anstey (CONS)

Area (2021)
  - Land: 73.26 km^{2} (28.29 sq mi)
- Elevation at weather station: 10.7 m (35 ft)

Population (2021)
  - Total: 4,864
  - Density: 66.4/km^{2} (172/sq mi)
- Time zone: UTC−03:30 (NST)
  - Summer (DST): UTC−02:30 (NDT)
- Postal code span: A8A
- Area code: 709
- Highways: Route 1 (TCH); Route 430
- Website: deerlake.ca

Deer Lake is a town in the western part of the island of Newfoundland in the province of Newfoundland and Labrador, Canada. Deer Lake is approximately 50 km northeast of Corner Brook.

The town derives its name from Deer Lake and is situated at the outlet of the upper Humber River at the northeastern end of the lake. It is contiguous with two smaller hamlets, Nicholsville and Spillway.

== History ==
The first settlers in the area arrived from Cape Breton Island, Nova Scotia in 1864. Originally loggers and trappers, the settlers later took up farming.

In 1922, a work camp was set up to support the pulp and paper industry in the form of the International Pulp and Paper Company. The camp would later become the town of Deer Lake. A formal townsite was constructed in 1925 and included a railway terminal, churches and a small hospital. The town was incorporated in 1950 with Phil Hodder as its first mayor.

Deer Lake Regional Airport, one of the busiest airports in the province, was built in 1955; it is one of the town's major employers. In 2004, the airport terminal redesign was started, and completed in June 2007. The primary population that the airport serves is approximately 55,000. The airport serves people from Rocky Harbour to Corner Brook, as well as around Deer Lake.

An air raid siren, brought over from England during the construction of the hydro plant in the 1920s, is located at the plant. It may be heard around town. The whistle blows at 7 and 8 AM, at noon and 1 PM, and at 5 and 6 PM. It is heard throughout the community from Monday to Saturday; it does not sound on Sunday.

== Name ==
The town was named by early settlers of the area. Caribou could be seen crossing the lake in huge quantities. The first Europeans who came to this area, having never before seen caribou called them 'deer'. However, 'deer' in older times could simply mean animal. The town was then named accordingly.

== Economy ==
The town is located in Division No. 5 and is the gateway to the Great Northern Peninsula, owing to an important highway interchange on the Trans-Canada Highway. It is the closest major community to Gros Morne National Park and is home to the Deer Lake Regional Airport.

A hydroelectric plant was established on the Humber River in 1925 to provide electricity to a pulp and paper mill in Corner Brook.

== Sights and tourism ==
Deer Lake offers accommodation for tourists as well as restaurants, supermarkets, convenience stores and gas stations. There is a stadium, swimming pool and a bowling alley in the Hodder Memorial Recreational Complex. St. Paul's United Church of Christ, a wooden church dating from 1955 and the modern Salvation Army building are worth a visit.

The town has two major trail systems: namely, the "Deer Lake Beach Trail," which extends to the north end of Deer Lake, and the Humber River Nature Trail that extends from Nicholsville Bridge to Deer Lake Airport. The town is often referred to as the Snowmobile Hub of Newfoundland and Labrador because it has the advantage of being located at the center of a network of groomed trails that lead to the deep powder and untouched vistas of the province.

The town is home to a number of festivals and events throughout the year. Festivities include the Annual Deer Lake Strawberry Festival, Thomas Amusements Fair, and The Deer Lake Winterfest.

== Demographics ==
In the 2021 Canadian census conducted by Statistics Canada, Deer Lake had a population of 4,864 living in 2,139 of its 2,309 total private dwellings, a change of −7.3% from its 2016 population of 5,249. With a land area of 73.26 km^{2} (28.29 sq mi), it had a population density of 66.4/km^{2} (172.0/sq mi) in 2021.

== Climate ==
Deer Lake has a humid continental climate (Dfb) with moderately warm summers that are on the short side, with winters that are moderated by its proximity to a large body of water. With precipitation high year-round, Deer Lake receives plenty of snowfall in winters.

Climate data for Deer Lake Climate ID: 8401500; coordinates 49°10′N 57°26′W; elevation: 10.7 m (35 ft); 1991–2020 normals
Month	Jan	Feb	Mar	Apr	May	Jun	Jul	Aug	Sep	Oct	Nov	Dec	Year
Record high °C (°F)	16.5 (61.7)	14.0 (57.2)	19.0 (66.2)	23.0 (73.4)	28.0 (82.4)	33.0 (91.4)	35.6 (96.1)	32.2 (90.0)	29.0 (84.2)	23.3 (73.9)	21.1 (70.0)	16.7 (62.1)	35.6 (96.1)
Mean daily maximum °C (°F)	−3.1 (26.4)	−3.4 (25.9)	0.7 (33.3)	6.3 (43.3)	12.9 (55.2)	18.0 (64.4)	21.9 (71.4)	21.6 (70.9)	17.0 (62.6)	10.4 (50.7)	4.6 (40.3)	0.0 (32.0)	8.9 (48.0)
Daily mean °C (°F)	−7.2 (19.0)	−8.0 (17.6)	−4.1 (24.6)	1.9 (35.4)	7.4 (45.3)	12.2 (54.0)	16.5 (61.7)	16.4 (61.5)	12.3 (54.1)	6.6 (43.9)	1.5 (34.7)	−3.3 (26.1)	4.4 (39.8)
Mean daily minimum °C (°F)	−11.2 (11.8)	−12.7 (9.1)	−8.8 (16.2)	−2.5 (27.5)	1.9 (35.4)	6.4 (43.5)	11.0 (51.8)	11.3 (52.3)	7.5 (45.5)	2.7 (36.9)	−1.6 (29.1)	−6.6 (20.1)	−0.2 (31.6)
Record low °C (°F)	−33.9 (−29.0)	−37.2 (−35.0)	−35.0 (−31.0)	−22.0 (−7.6)	−10.6 (12.9)	−4.4 (24.1)	−0.6 (30.9)	−2.2 (28.0)	−5.0 (23.0)	−10.5 (13.1)	−20.6 (−5.1)	−29.4 (−20.9)	−37.2 (−35.0)
Average precipitation mm (inches)	109.8 (4.32)	83.5 (3.29)	71.7 (2.82)	70.1 (2.76)	89.2 (3.51)	88.3 (3.48)	98.5 (3.88)	109.9 (4.33)	106.2 (4.18)	105.7 (4.16)	101.3 (3.99)	97.3 (3.83)	1,131.5 (44.55)
Average rainfall mm (inches)	24.8 (0.98)	17.3 (0.68)	27.5 (1.08)	49.8 (1.96)	84.3 (3.32)	87.8 (3.46)	98.5 (3.88)	109.9 (4.33)	106.2 (4.18)	101.0 (3.98)	74.8 (2.94)	35.6 (1.40)	817.5 (32.19)
Average snowfall cm (inches)	85.0 (33.5)	66.1 (26.0)	44.2 (17.4)	20.3 (8.0)	4.8 (1.9)	0.5 (0.2)	0 (0)	0 (0)	0 (0)	4.8 (1.9)	26.6 (10.5)	61.7 (24.3)	314 (123.7)
Average precipitation days (≥ 0.2 mm)	19.3	16.0	15.1	13.0	15.4	13.9	15.1	15.4	16.0	18.9	17.4	20.4	195.9
Average rainy days (≥ 0.2 mm)	2.7	2.9	5.6	9.5	15.0	13.9	15.1	15.4	16.0	18.7	12.6	6.8	134.2
Average snowy days (≥ 0.2 cm)	16.7	14.0	10.6	4.6	0.83	0.04	0	0	0	0.75	6.2	15.7	69.42
Source: Environment and Climate Change Canada

== Transport ==
The community is served by Deer Lake Regional Airport, which offers direct flights to St. John's, Labrador City, Halifax, Montreal and Toronto. The town is also located on the Trans-Canada Highway, which connects it to the rest of Canada.

== Notable people ==
- Dwight Ball, former Premier of Newfoundland and Labrador
- Darren Langdon, former National Hockey League player
- Carol Anstey, Member of Parliament for Long Range Mountains

== Gallery ==
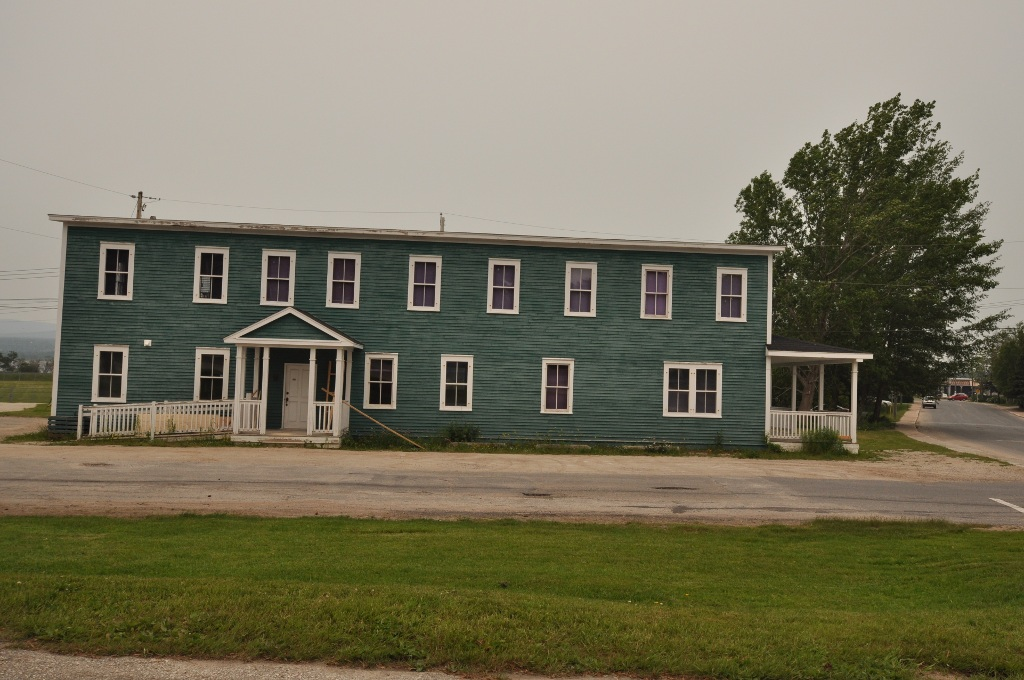
Deer Lake International Pulp and Paper Company staff house

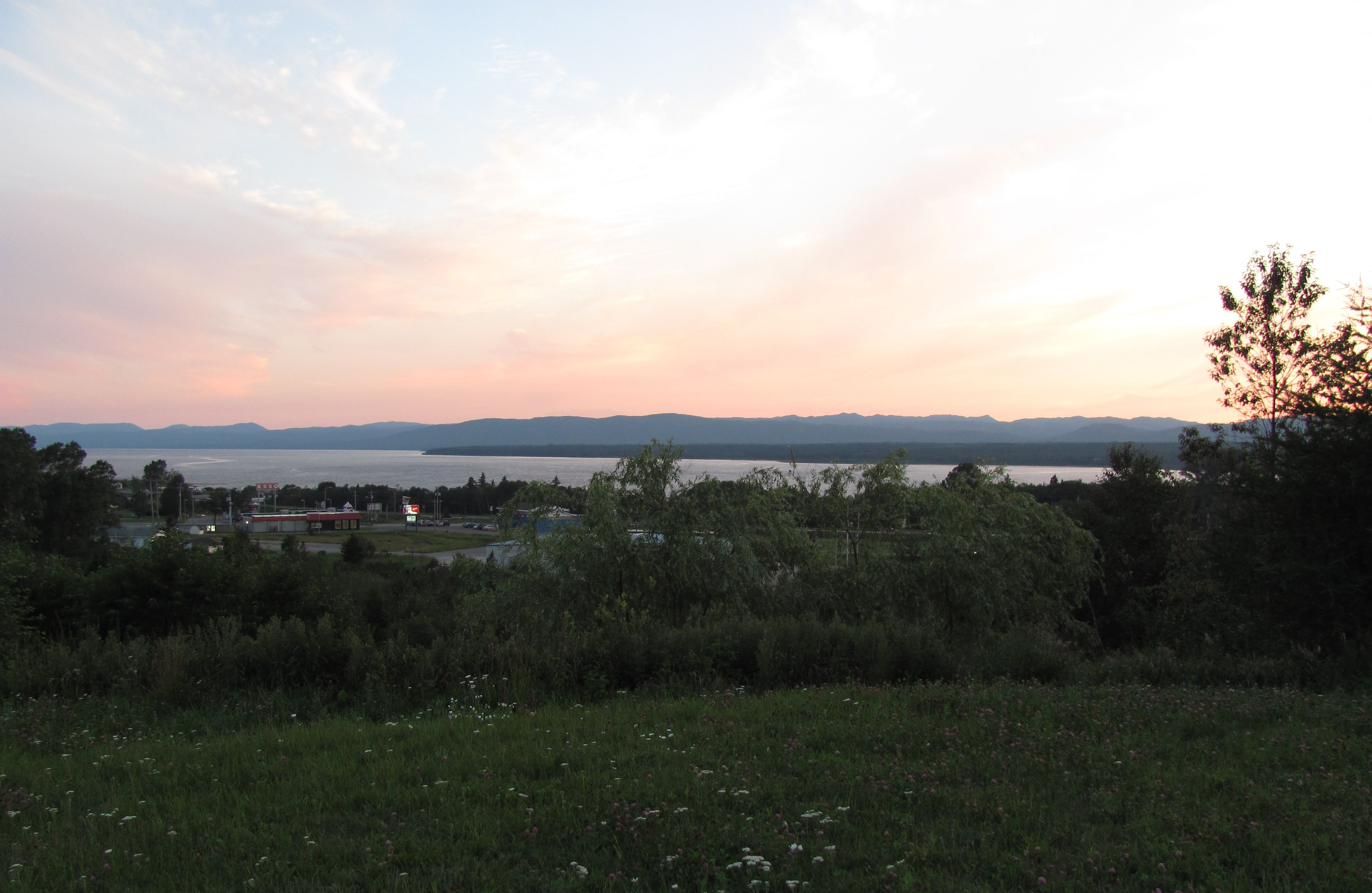
Deer Lake

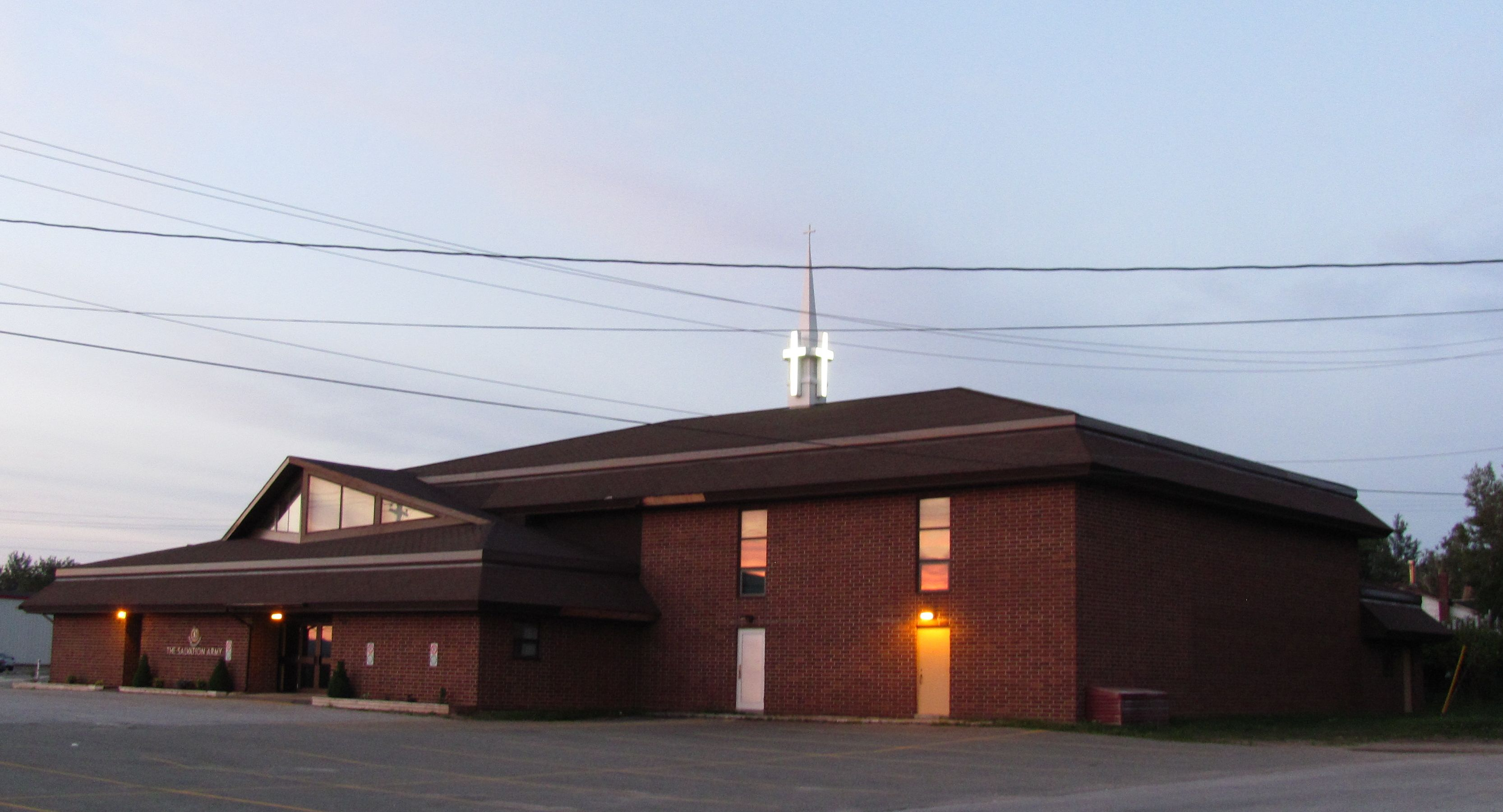
Salvation Army

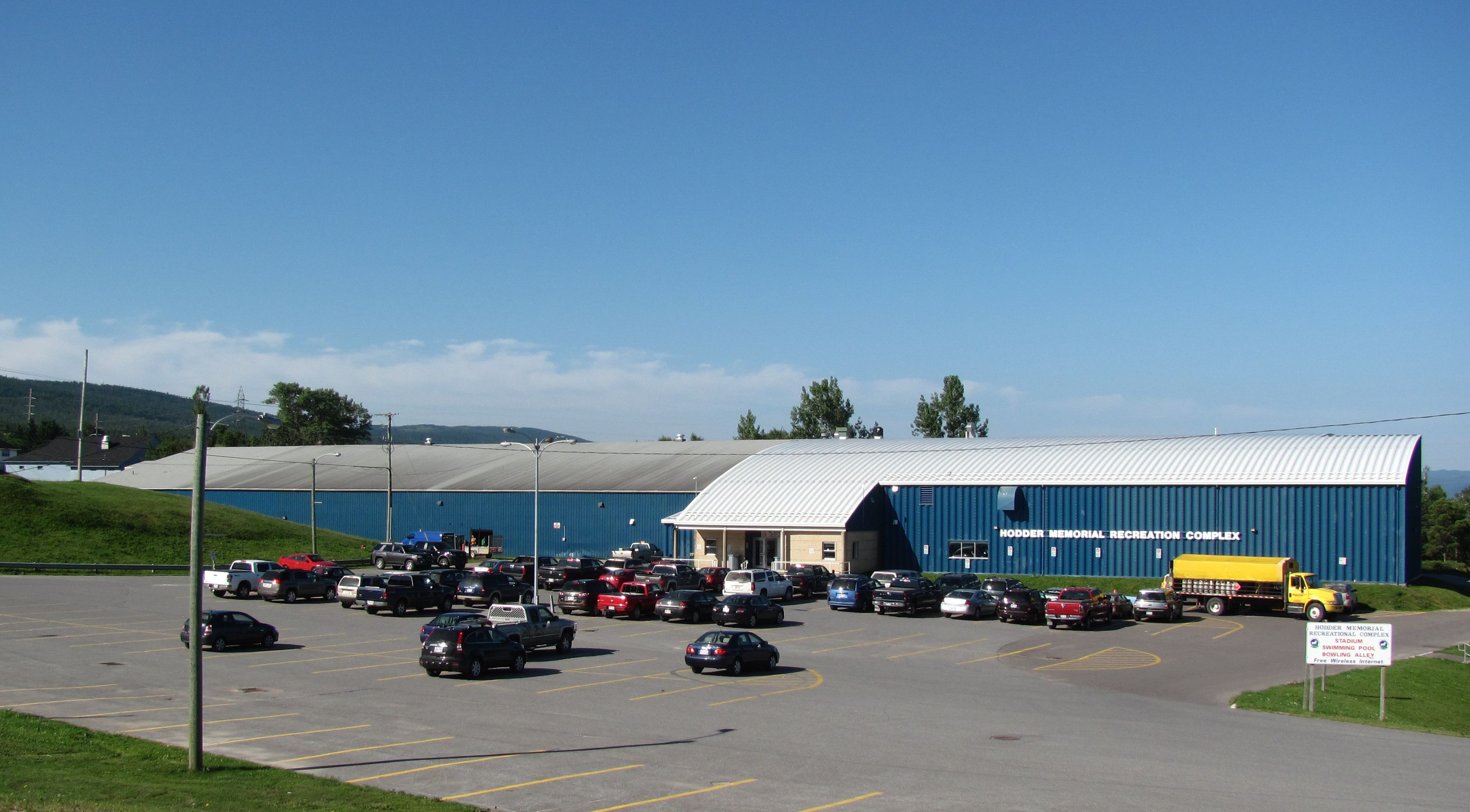
Hodder Memorial Recreational Complex

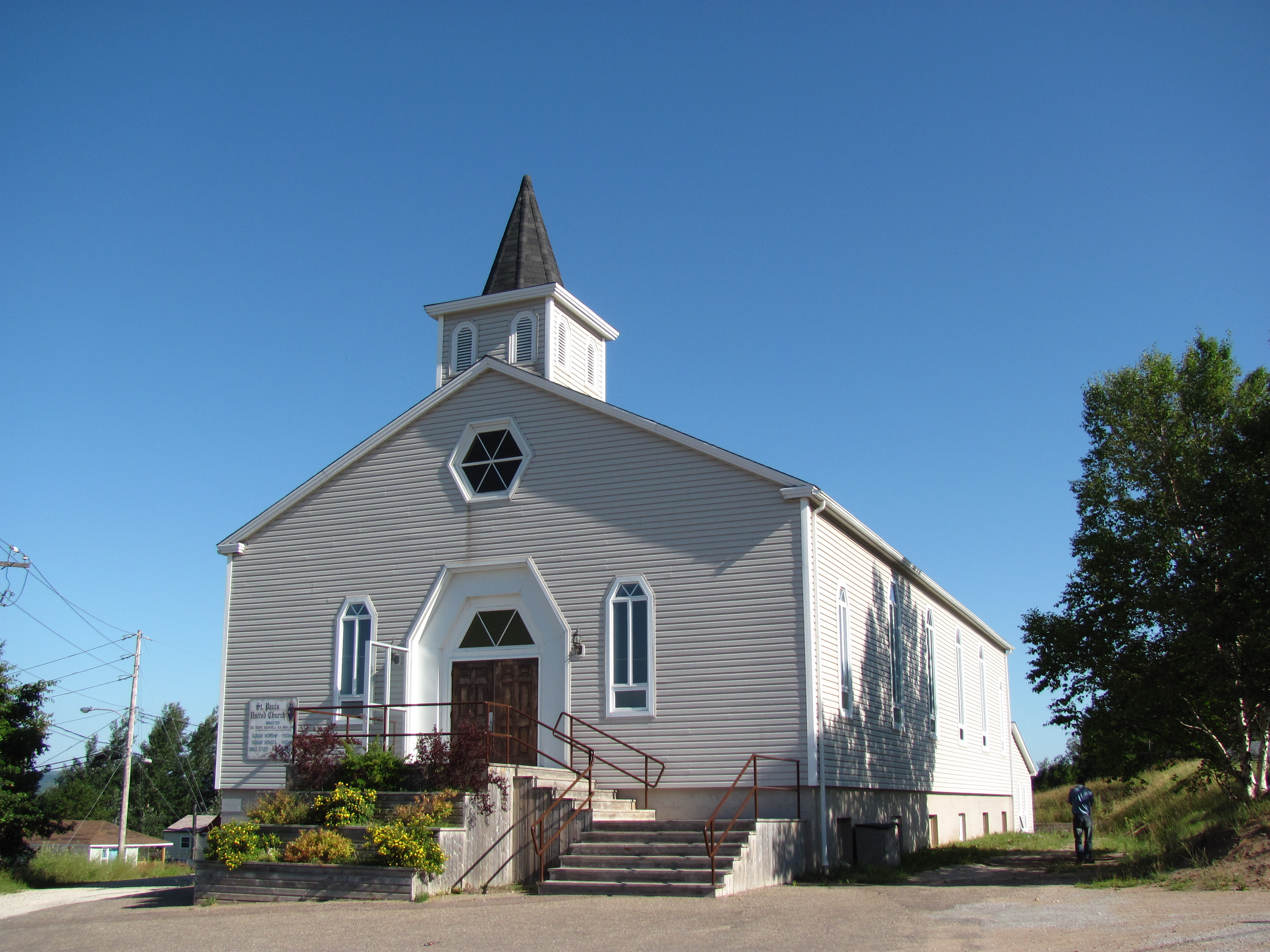
St. Paul's United Church

== See also ==
- List of municipalities in Newfoundland and Labrador
