= Pynns Brook, Newfoundland and Labrador =

Pynns Brook
- Local service district / designated place
- Location of Pynns Brook Pynns Brook (Canada)
- Coordinates: 49.082°N 57.549°W
- Country: Canada
- Province: Newfoundland and Labrador
- Region: Newfoundland
- Census division: 5
- Census subdivision: F

Government
  - Type: Unincorporated

Area
  - Land: 8.06 km^{2} (3.11 sq mi)

Population (2016)
  - Total: 96
- Time zone: UTC−03:30 (NST)
  - Summer (DST): UTC−02:30 (NDT)
- Area code: 709

Pynns Brook is a local service district and designated place in the Canadian province of Newfoundland and Labrador.

== Geography ==
Pynns Brook is in Newfoundland within Subdivision F of Division No. 5.

== Demographics ==
As a designated place in the 2016 Census of Population conducted by Statistics Canada, Pynns Brook recorded a population of 96 living in 45 of its 73 total private dwellings, a change of −10.3% from its 2011 population of 107. With a land area of 8.06 km^{2} (3.11 sq mi), it had a population density of 11.9/km^{2} (30.8/sq mi) in 2016.

== Government ==
Pynns Brook is a local service district (LSD) that is governed by a committee responsible for the provision of certain services to the community. The chair of the LSD committee is Tracy Tipple.

== See also ==
- List of communities in Newfoundland and Labrador
- List of designated places in Newfoundland and Labrador
- List of local service districts in Newfoundland and Labrador
