= Steady Brook =

- Town
- Aerial view (2026)

- Seal

- Location of Steady Brook in Newfoundland
- Coordinates: 48°58′N 57°48′W
- Country: Canada
- Province: Newfoundland and Labrador

Government
  - Mayor: William (Bill) Dawson

Population (2021)
  - Total: 416
- Time zone: UTC-3:30 (Newfoundland Time)
  - Summer (DST): UTC-2:30 (Newfoundland Daylight)
- Area code: 709
- Highways: Route 1 (TCH)
- Website: Steady Brook official site

Steady Brook (2021 population: 416) is a Canadian town in the province of Newfoundland and Labrador. Located on the west coast of the island of Newfoundland, the town is situated 8 kilometres east of the city of Corner Brook in the lower Humber Valley. The town is surrounded by the Long Range Mountains and sits astride the Humber River. Steady Brook has become a thriving community in recent years as a result of provincial investments in the Marble Mountain alpine ski resort, along with golf courses and other recreational amenities.

The twinning of Highway 1, the Trans-Canada Highway, through the valley, as well as the expansion of the Deer Lake Regional Airport has made Steady Brook attractive to active retirees and professionals in the west coast region. Its infrastructure, recreation facilities, community programs and scenic amenities have driven residential development in recent years.

Steady Brook is a progressive 'green community', encouraging recycling and composting, and limited use of cosmetic pesticides.

== Demographics ==
In the 2021 Census of Population conducted by Statistics Canada, Steady Brook had a population of 416 living in 178 of its 195 total private dwellings, a change of −6.3% from its 2016 population of 444. With a land area of 1.24 km^{2} (0.48 sq mi), it had a population density of 335.5/km^{2} (868.9/sq mi) in 2021.

== See also ==
- List of cities and towns in Newfoundland and Labrador
