= Little Rapids, Newfoundland and Labrador =

Human settlement in Newfoundland, Canada

Coordinates: 48°59′N 57°44′W

Little Rapids is a local service district and designated place in the Canadian province of Newfoundland and Labrador. It is east of Corner Brook.

== Geography ==
Little Rapids is in Newfoundland within Subdivision F of Division No. 5. It is made up mostly of farm land and neighbours the Humber Valley Golf Resort.

== Demographics ==
As a designated place in the 2016 Census of Population conducted by Statistics Canada, Little Rapids recorded a population of 225 living in 101 of its 146 total private dwellings, a change of −3.4% from its 2011 population of 233. With a land area of 5.83 km^{2} (2.25 sq mi), it had a population density of 38.6/km^{2} (100.0/sq mi) in 2016.

== Government ==
Little Rapids is a local service district (LSD) that is governed by a committee responsible for the provision of certain services to the community. The chair of the LSD committee is Butch Vardy.

== See also ==
- List of communities in Newfoundland and Labrador
- List of designated places in Newfoundland and Labrador
- List of local service districts in Newfoundland and Labrador
