= Newfoundland and Labrador Route 100 =

Highway in Newfoundland and Labrador

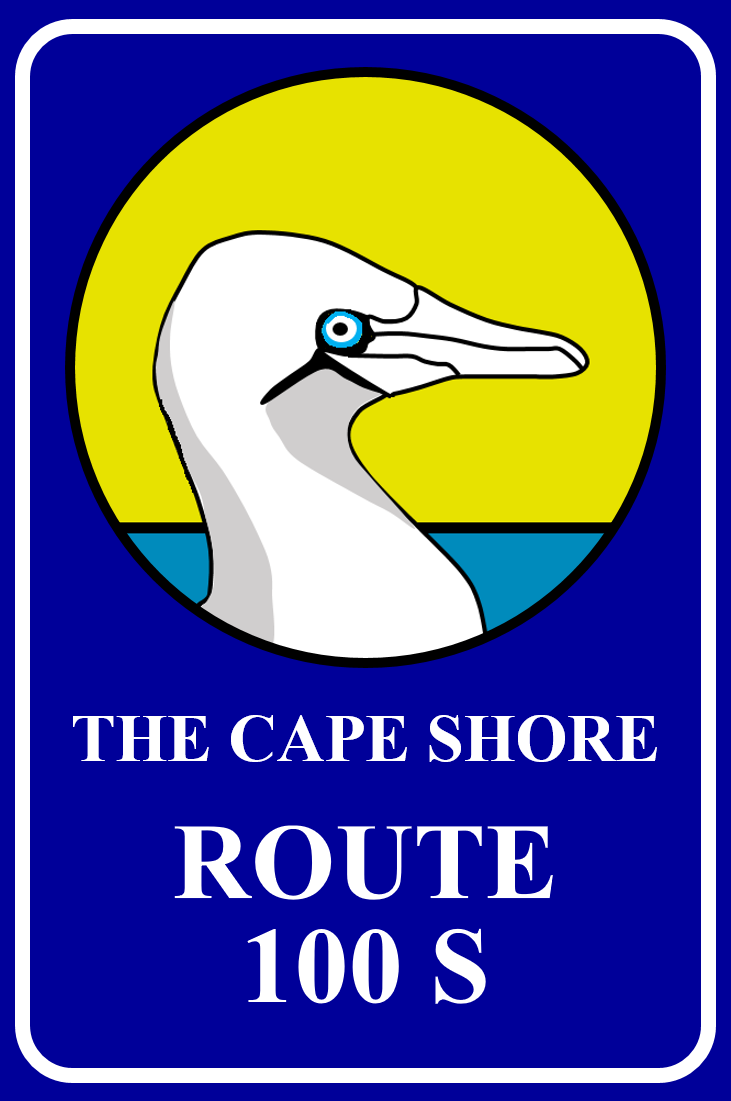
Route 100
- The Cape Shore Highway; Argentia Access Road

Route information
- Maintained by Newfoundland and Labrador Department of Transportation and Infrastructure
- Length: 108 km (67 mi)

Major junctions
- North end: Route 1 (TCH) at Whitbourne
- Route 101 near Dunville; Route 102 at Dunville; Route 91 at Southeast Placentia
- South end: Route 92 at Branch

Location
- Country: Canada
- Province: Newfoundland and Labrador

Highway system
- Highways in Newfoundland and Labrador
← Route 94	→ Route 101

Route 100 (also known as The Cape Shore Highway and Argentia Access Road) is a major highway in Newfoundland and Labrador. The highway begins at its northern terminus at the Trans-Canada Highway (Route 1) in the town of Whitbourne, runs for 108 kilometres (67 mi) until it ends at its southern terminus, the town of Branch, where it transitions into Route 92. Motorists can drive along the coast of Placentia Bay once traveling south of Point Verde.

The route's most important community is the town of Placentia, which is home to the province's only lift bridge.

Route 100 also serves as an access to the Marine Atlantic ferry to Nova Scotia, which is located in Argentia. The ferry only operates during the summer months.

== Route description ==
Route 100 begins as The Cape Shore Highway at an intersection between Route 92 and Loop Road in downtown Branch and it heads west through neighbourhoods to leave town and pass through rural areas, where the highway has intersections with local roads leading to Point Lance, Cape St. Mary's, and Cape St. Mary's Ecological Reserve. Route 100 now turns northward along the coastline as it passes through St. Bride's, Cuslett (where it crosses over a river), Angels Cove, and Patrick's Cove (where it crosses a small brook). The highway now becomes very winding as it passes through Gooseberry Cove and Gooseberry Cove Provincial Park, Ship Cove, Great Baraway, and Point Verde. Route 100 now enters the town of Placentia and immediately meets Route 91 in Southeast Placentia. It turns north and passes through the actual community of Placentia before crossing a lift bridge into Jerseyside. The highway now has an intersection with a local road leading to the Castle Hill National Historic Site before passing through Freshwater. Route 100 now meets a road leading to Argentia and the Nova Scotia ferry before turning eastward and more inland as Argentia Access Road. It now bypasses through Ferndale on its north side before passing through Dunville, where it has an intersection with Route 102. The highway leaves the town limits and heads northeast along a river valley to have an intersection with Route 101 before passing by Fitzgerald's Pond Park. Route 100 now has an intersection with a local road leading to Placentia Junction before passing through rural areas for several kilometres to enter Whitbourne and Route 100 comes to an end shortly thereafter at an intersection with Route 1 (Trans-Canada Highway).

== Major intersections ==
Location	km	mi	Destinations	Notes
Branch	0.0	0.0	Route 92 north (North Harbour-Branch Highway) – North Harbour, Colinet Loop Road	Southern terminus of Route 92 and Route 100; Route 100 begins as the Cape Shore Highway
	4.5	2.8	Point Lance Road (Route 100-17) - Point Lance	
	13.9	8.6	Cape St. Mary's Road - Cape St. Mary's, Cape St. Mary's Ecological Reserve	
Southeast Placentia	62.7	39.0	Route 91 east (Old Placentia Highway) – Colinet	Western terminus of Route 91
Jerseyside	66.8	41.5	Ferndale Road (Route 100-20) - Ferndale	
Freshwater	67.4	41.9	Castle Hill Road - Castle Hill National Historic Site	
Freshwater	69.0	42.9	Argentia Access Road - Argentia, Marine Atlantic Nova Scotia Ferry	Route 100 becomes the Argentia Access Road
Freshwater	72.2	44.9	Ferndale Road (Route 100-20) - Ferndale	
Dunville	76.0	47.2	Route 102 north (Fox Harbour Road) – Fox Harbour, Ship Harbour	Southern terminus of Route 102
Dunville	79.3	49.3	Southeast Placentia Road To Route 91 – Southeast Placentia, Colinet	
	88.6	55.1	Route 101 north (Long Harbour Access Road) – Long Harbour	Southern terminus of Route 101
	97.7	60.7	Placentia Junction Road - Placentia Junction	
Whitbourne	108	67	Route 1 (TCH) – Clarenville, St. John's	Northern terminus
1.000 mi = 1.609 km; 1.000 km = 0.621 mi: Route transition

== Attractions along Route 100 ==
There are numerous attractions along Route 100, including the Marine Atlantic Ferry to Nova Scotia in Argentia and the Castle Hill National Historic Site. Two parks and one reserve are also located along Route 100, those being the Fitzgerald's Pond Park, the Gooseberry Cove Provincial Park, and the Cape St. Mary's Ecological Reserve.
