= Newfoundland and Labrador Route 91 =

Highway in Newfoundland and Labrador, Canada

Route 91
- Old Placentia Highway

Route information
- Maintained by Newfoundland and Labrador Department of Transportation and Infrastructure
- Length: 48 km (30 mi)

Major junctions
- East end: Route 90 at St. Catherine's
- Route 93 in Colinet; Route 81 in Colinet; Route 92 near Colinet
- West end: Route 100 at Southeast Placentia

Location
- Country: Canada
- Province: Newfoundland and Labrador

Highway system
- Highways in Newfoundland and Labrador
| ← Route 90 | → Route 92 |

Route 91, also known as Old Placentia Highway, is a 48-kilometre-long (30 mi) east–west highway located on the Avalon Peninsula in the Canadian province of Newfoundland and Labrador. The highway starts at a junction at Route 90, traveling through the town of Colinet on a paved road, then transitions to a dirt road just west of the Route 92 junction, only to transition back to a paved road prior to approaching its western terminus, Southeast Placentia, where it intersects with Route 100. Along the stretch of dirt road is Cataracts Provincial Park, one of only a small number of active provincial parks remaining since 1997.

== Major intersections ==
| Location | km | mi | Destinations | Notes |
|---|---|---|---|---|
| Southeast Placentia | 0.0 | 0.0 | Route 100 (The Cape Shore Highway) – Placentia, Argentia, St. Bride's, Branch | Western terminus; provides access to the Marine Atlantic Nova Scotia Ferry at Argentia |
| Cataracts Provincial Park | 31.2 | 19.4 | Route 92 south (North Harbour-Branch Highway) – Branch, North Harbour | Northern terminus of Route 92 |
| Colinet | 34.6 | 21.5 | Route 81 north (Markland Road) – Markland, Whitbourne | Southern terminus of Route 81 |
| Colinet | 34.9 | 21.7 | Route 93 east (Mount Carmel Road) – Harricott, Mount Carmel | Western terminus of Route 93 |
| St. Catherine's | 48 | 30 | Route 90 (Salmonier Line/Irish Loop Drive) – Holyrood, St. Mary's, St. Vincent's | Eastern terminus |
1.000 mi = 1.609 km; 1.000 km = 0.621 mi
