= Newfoundland and Labrador Route 92 =

Highway in Newfoundland and Labrador, Canada

Route 92
- North Harbour-Branch Highway

Route information
- Maintained by Newfoundland and Labrador Department of Transportation and Infrastructure
- Length: 51.9 km (32.2 mi)

Major junctions
- North end: Route 91 near Colinet
- South end: Route 100 at Branch

Location
- Country: Canada
- Province: Newfoundland and Labrador

Highway system
- Highways in Newfoundland and Labrador
← Route 91	→ Route 93

Route 92, also known as North Harbour-Branch Highway, is a 51.9-kilometre-long (32.2 mi) highway on the Avalon Peninsula of the Canadian province of Newfoundland and Labrador. Its northern terminus is an intersection at Route 91, near the town of Colinet, and its southern terminus is at the town of Branch, where the route transitions into Route 100.

== Route description ==
Route 92 begins at an intersection between Route 100 (Cape Shore Highway) and Loop Road in Branch and heads east to immediately cross a large Inlet via a Causeway. It then leaves town and winds its way along the coastline for several kilometres as it crosses the Beckfords River. The highway crosses the Red Head River before turning more inland and northeast through rural hilly terrain. Route 92 briefly follows the water again as it passes through North Harbour before turning completely north to cross another river and coming to an end at an intersection with Route 91 (Old Placentia Highway) between Colinet and Cataracts Provincial Park.

== Major intersections ==
Location	km	mi	Destinations	Notes
Branch	0.0	0.0	Route 100 north (The Cape Shore Highway) – St. Bride's, Placentia Loop Road	Southern terminus of Route 92 and Route 100
Cataracts Provincial Park	51.9	32.2	Route 91 (Old Placentia Highway) – Placentia, Colinet	Northern terminus
1.000 mi = 1.609 km; 1.000 km = 0.621 mi
