= Newfoundland and Labrador Route 101 =

Highway in Newfoundland and Labrador, Canada

Route 101
- Long Harbour Access Road

Route information
- Maintained by Newfoundland and Labrador Department of Transportation and Infrastructure
- Length: 14.8 km (9.2 mi)

Major junctions
- South end: Route 100 near Dunville
- North end: Route 202 at Long Harbour

Location
- Country: Canada
- Province: Newfoundland and Labrador

Highway system
- Highways in Newfoundland and Labrador
← Route 100	→ Route 102

Route 101, also known as Long Harbour Access Road, is a 14.8-kilometre-long (9.2 mi) north–south highway located on the Avalon Peninsula in the Canadian province of Newfoundland and Labrador. It is an access road to Long Harbour, with its southern terminus being an intersection at Route 100, near the town of Dunville, and its northern terminus is an intersection at Route 202, near Long Harbour. This highway is used frequently by employees who work at the Vale Nickel Processing Plant in Long Harbour.

== Major intersections ==
Location	km	mi	Destinations	Notes
	0.0	0.0	Route 100 (Argentia Access Road) to Route 1 (TCH) – Argentia, St. Bride's, Marine Atlantic Nova Scotia Ferry	Southern terminus
Long Harbour	14.8	9.2	Route 202 (Long Harbour Road) to Route 1 (TCH) – Long Harbour, Mount Arlington Heights, Chapel Arm	Northern terminus
1.000 mi = 1.609 km; 1.000 km = 0.621 mi
