= Cape Shore =

Region of the Avalon Peninsula in Newfoundland and Labrador, Canada

Coordinates: 46°57′N 54°10′W

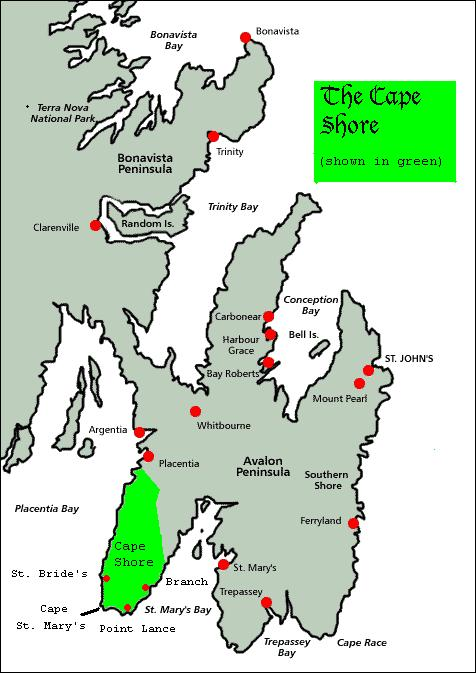
Cape Shore (in green), on the southeastern shore of Placentia Bay and the southwestern shore of St. Mary's Bay. St. John's, the provincial capital, is approximately 160 km to the northeast

The Cape Shore is a region on the southwestern portion of the Avalon Peninsula on the island of Newfoundland, Canada.

Often confused or conflated with the Southern Shore (a rural district with strong Irish-Newfoundland heritage stretching south from St. John's to Trepassey), the Cape Shore is similarly rural and populated by Irish Newfoundlanders, but is geographically distinct. It is named for Cape St. Mary's, the southeastern tip of Placentia Bay, celebrated in the famous Newfoundland ballad Let Me Fish Off Cape St. Mary's.

The Cape Shore begins in the Town of Placentia and continues along the eastern shore of Placentia Bay, rounding Cape St. Mary's to include the St. Mary's Bay communities of Point Lance and Branch (because Branch and Point Lance are approximately 40 km away from the next St. Mary's Bay community, North Harbour, but only 16 km from the largest Cape Shore community, St. Bride's, they are included in the Cape Shore despite technically being in a different bay).

== History ==
Although nearby to Placentia, French capital of Newfoundland until 1713 and important English town afterwards, the Cape Shore was largely uninhabited until the late 18th and early 19th centuries, when the Placentia merchants Saunders and Sweetman began bringing settlers there from the area around Waterford, Ireland. The river valleys of the Cape Shore are relatively fertile areas suitable for types of small-scale farming, a rarity in Newfoundland, and communities like St. Bride's and Angels Cove were originally settled as farming communities, not fishing communities like most settlements in Newfoundland. To this day, commercial sheep, dairy, and vegetable farms are in operation on the Cape Shore.

However, the Cape Shore is adjacent to what were some of the richest fishing grounds in the world, as exhibited in the old Newfoundland saying Cape St. Mary's pays for all (meaning, losses incurred during a poor fishing year could be recouped by a quick fishing trip to Cape St. Mary's). By the latter part of the 19th century, fishing was the main occupation, and continues to be important today, despite the fishing industry's woes in the last 15 years (including the devastating Atlantic cod moratorium).

Today, tourism is an important industry. The Cape St. Mary's Ecological Reserve, just south of St. Bride's, draws thousands of visitors every year. Its rolling green hyper-oceanic barrens and meadows drop 400 feet (120 m) down dramatic sea-cliffs to the pounding surf below. The bird colony on 'bird rock' is the reserve's largest draw, however.

During the breeding season, it is home to 24,000 Northern gannet, 20,000 black-legged kittiwake, 20,000 common murre, and 2,000 thick-billed murre. In addition, more than 100 pairs of razorbill, more than 60 pairs of black guillemot, plus double-crested and great cormorant, and Northern fulmar nest there.

All of these birds nest on or around a 400-foot (120 m) high stack of rock, mere metres from the shore. A pleasant 15 minute walk along the coast from the Interpretation Centre's parking lot brings visitors to the observation point, a mere 10 metres from as many as 60,000 nesting birds. It is one of North America's largest seabird colonies, but it is, without doubt, the very most accessible.

== Communities on the Cape Shore ==
The communities of the Cape Shore include, from north to south:

- Point Verde (just south of Placentia)
- Little Barasway ('Barasway' is a Newfoundland English word meaning barachois)
- Big Barasway or Great Barasway
- Ship Cove (home to Spyglass Creamery, a traditional dairy)
- Gooseberry Cove (a provincial park; home to a sandy beach popular with locals; praised for its beauty by Rex Murphy in his book Points of View)
- Patrick's Cove
- Angels Cove
- Cuslett (home to the Tramore Theatre, an innovative cultural institution that celebrates and preserves the endangered culture of the Cape Shore)
- St. Bride's (the administrative centre for the Cape Shore, home to several business and a K-12 school, Fatima Academy)
- Point Lance (home to a pure white sand beach approximately 1-mile (1.6 km) long)
- Branch, Newfoundland and Labrador

Sometimes Placentia, on the northern edge of the region, is also considered part of the Cape Shore. This large and originally French town however has a totally different history.

== Population ==
According to the 2006 census, Division 1 Subdivision C includes the unincorporated communities from Big Barasway/Great Barasway south to Cuslett. Its population was 185 in 2006 .

St. Bride's had a population of 386 in 2006 . Point Lance had 119 , and Branch had 309 .

Thus, it is possible to estimate the population of the Cape Shore as 999 people in 2006. This is an 11% decline from 2001, when the sum of these 3 towns and one census subdivision was 1,117.

== See also ==
- St. Mary's Bay
- Cape St. Mary's Ecological Reserve
- Irish Newfoundlanders
- Newfoundland Irish
