= Newfoundland and Labrador Route 201 =

Highway in Newfoundland and Labrador, Canada

Route 201
- Osprey Trail

Route information
- Maintained by Newfoundland and Labrador Department of Transportation and Infrastructure
- Length: 28.0 km (17.4 mi)

Major junctions
- South end: Route 1 (TCH) / Route 202 (Exit 27) in Chapel Arm
- Route 203 in Bellevue Beach
- North end: Route 1 (TCH) near Chance Cove

Location
- Country: Canada
- Province: Newfoundland and Labrador

Highway system
- Highways in Newfoundland and Labrador
| ← Route 102 | → Route 202 |

Route 201 (known as the Osprey Trail) is a provincial road in the Canadian province of Newfoundland and Labrador. It is one of only three loop roads designated with a route number that starts and ends at the Trans-Canada Highway (Route 351, Norris Arm Road, and Route 404, Robinsons Road, are the others). The road spans 28 kilometres (17 mi), and allows for a scenic journey along the southern coast of Trinity Bay. There are quite a number of summer cottages along the route, and highway is known for an abundance of ospreys during the summer months.

The image of the osprey used in the logo on the Osprey Trail signage is believed to have been taken from the back of the 1989 issue of Canada’s ten-dollar bill.

== Route description ==
Route 201 begins in Chapel Arm at an interchange between Route 1 (Trans-Canada Highway, Exit 27) and Route 202 (Long Harbour Road). It heads north to pass through downtown before leaving and passing along the coastline to pass through Norman's Cove-Long Cove. The highway now turns to the west and winds its way more inland for several kilometres before passing through Thornlea, Bellevue, and Bellevue Beach, where it has an intersection with Route 203 (Fair Haven Road). Route 201 winds its way along the coastline for a few kilometres to have an intersection with a local road leading to Chance Cove before heading west through hilly terrain to come to an end at another intersection with Route 1 (TCH).

As with most highways in Newfoundland and Labrador, the entire length of Route 201 is a two-lane highway.

== Major intersections ==
| Location | km | mi | Destinations | Notes |
|---|---|---|---|---|
| Chapel Arm | 0.0 | 0.0 | Route 1 (TCH) – Clarenville, St. John's; Route 202 west (Long Harbour Road) – Long Harbour, Mount Arlington Heights | Exit 27 on Route 1; eastern terminus of Route 202; southern terminus of Route 201 |
| Bellevue Beach | 18.6 | 11.6 | Route 203 south (Fair Haven Road) to Route 1 (TCH) – Fair Haven | Northern terminus of Route 203 |
| Chance Cove | 23.7 | 14.7 | Chance Cove Road (Route 201-16) - Chance Cove | |
| | 28.0 | 17.4 | Route 1 (TCH) – Clarenville, St. John's | Northern terminus |
1.000 mi = 1.609 km; 1.000 km = 0.621 mi
