= Newfoundland and Labrador Route 203 =

Highway in Newfoundland and Labrador, Canada

Route 203
- Fair Haven Road

Route information
- Maintained by Newfoundland and Labrador Department of Transportation and Infrastructure
- Length: 13.7 km (8.5 mi)

Major junctions
- South end: Fair Haven
- Route 1 (TCH) in Bellevue Beach
- North end: Route 201 in Bellevue Beach

Location
- Country: Canada
- Province: Newfoundland and Labrador

Highway system
- Highways in Newfoundland and Labrador
| ← Route 202 | → Route 204 |

Route 203, also known as Fair Haven Road, is a 13.7-kilometre-long (8.5 mi) north–south highway along the Avalon Peninsula on the island of Newfoundland. It connects the community of Fair Haven with Bellevue and the Trans-Canada Highway. There are no other major intersections or communities along its entire length, and as with most highways in Newfoundland and Labrador, it is entirely a two-lane highway.

== Major intersections ==
| Location | km | mi | Destinations | Notes |
|---|---|---|---|---|
| Fair Haven | 0.0 | 0.0 | Main Road - Downtown, Harbour | Southern terminus |
| Bellevue Beach | 12.5 | 7.8 | Route 1 (TCH) – Clarenville, St. John's | |
| Bellevue Beach | 13.7 | 8.5 | Route 201 (Osprey Trail) – Chance Cove, Bellevue | Northern terminus |
1.000 mi = 1.609 km; 1.000 km = 0.621 mi
