= Chapel Arm =

- Town
- Location of Chapel Arm in Newfoundland
- Coordinates: 47°31′13.52″N 53°40′20.75″W
- Country: Canada
- Province: Newfoundland and Labrador

Government
  - Mayor: Lloyd Reid
  - Member of Parliament: Jonathan Rowe (C)
  - Member of the House of Assembly: Jeff Dwyer (PC)

Area
  - Land: 28.11 km^{2} (10.85 sq mi)

Population (2021)
  - Total: 446
  - Density: 15.9/km^{2} (41/sq mi)
- Time zone: UTC−03:30 (Newfoundland Time)
  - Summer (DST): UTC−02:30
- Postal code: A0B 1L0
- Area code: 709
- Highways: Route 1 (TCH); Route 201; Route 202
- Website: chapelarm.ca

Chapel Arm is a town in Newfoundland and Labrador, Canada. It is located on the island of Newfoundland and is located at the southeast corner of Trinity Bay, approximately 100 km (62 mi) west of St. John's and two km (one and a half miles) from the Trans-Canada Highway.

With the exception of a few families, the religious denominations are Anglican and Roman Catholic. It has two churches, a parish hall, a community centre, a LOL hall and a modern elementary school serving the communities of Chapel Arm, Norman’s Cove, Bellevue and Long Harbour. It has a doctor's office, municipal building, pharmacist, Home Hardware, and several auto garages.

The majority of people in Chapel Arm own their own homes. There is a well constructed breakwater with landing and docking facilities and a community building used for storage. There are banking facilities and a clinic located at Whitbourne about 13 km (eight miles) away.

With the ongoing construction of the Vale Canada hydro-metallurgical facility in Long Harbour, Chapel Arm has seen a sharp spike in employment and prosperity over the last several years.

== Name origin ==
No one is sure how Chapel Arm got its name. According to M. F. Howley, it was named for Lieutenant Edward Chappell, who sailed up Trinity Bay in 1818 (Encyclopedia of J.R. Smallwood). Historical records would suggest this claim to be incorrect. Early records of Trinity and the records of Benjamin Lester, a Poole merchant working there, mentions: "on November 10, 1767 sent sloop to Chapple for a load of birch and ships timbers that was left there".

The name of Chapel Arm goes back to 1765–1772, when James Cook and Michael Lane surveyed the coastal waters of Trinity Bay. Chapel Arm was more likely named for the spire-shaped headlands which can be seen as you enter this beautiful arm, since these headlands resemble a church or chapel roof.

The latter is the theory accepted by the majority of the population today.

== Demographics ==
In the 2021 Census of Population conducted by Statistics Canada, Chapel Arm had a population of 446 living in 204 of its 241 total private dwellings, a change of −2.4% from its 2016 population of 457. With a land area of 28.08 km^{2} (10.84 sq mi), it had a population density of 15.9/km^{2} (41.1/sq mi) in 2021.

== See also ==
- List of municipalities in Newfoundland and Labrador
