= Newfoundland and Labrador Route 202 =

Highway in Newfoundland and Labrador

Route 202
- Long Harbour Road

Route information
- Maintained by Newfoundland and Labrador Department of Transportation and Infrastructure
- Length: 9.9 km (6.2 mi)

Major junctions
- West end: Main Road / Long Harbour Nickel Processing Plant in Long Harbour-Mount Arlington Heights
- Route 101 in Long Harbour-Mount Arlington Heights
- East end: Route 1 (TCH) / Route 201 in Chapel Arm

Location
- Country: Canada
- Province: Newfoundland and Labrador

Highway system
- Highways in Newfoundland and Labrador
← Route 201	→ Route 203

Route 202, also known as Long Harbour Road, is a 9.9-kilometre-long (6.2 mi) east–west highway along the Avalon Peninsula on the island of Newfoundland. It connects the communities of Long Harbour-Mount Arlington Heights and Long Harbour Station with Chapel Arm and the Trans-Canada Highway.

== Route description ==
Route 202 begins in Long Harbour-Mount Arlington Heights at the intersection between Main Road and the gravel access road for the Long Harbour Nickel Processing Plant. It heads northeast through rural areas to have an intersection with Route 101 (Long Harbour Access Road) before leaving town and passing through rural wooded areas for the next several kilometres, where the highway passes through Long Harbour Station. Route 202 passes through more wooded areas before entering the Chapel Arm town limits and coming to an end at an interchange with Route 1 (Trans-Canada Highway, exit 27), with the road continuing northeast as Route 201 (Osprey Trail) into downtown.

== Major intersections ==
Location	km	mi	Destinations	Notes
Long Harbour-Mount Arlington Heights	0.0	0.0	Main Road (Route 202-10) - Long Harbour, Mount Arlington Heights Main Entrance to Long Harbour Nickel Processing Plant	Western terminus
Long Harbour-Mount Arlington Heights	0.9	0.56	Route 101 south (Long Harbour Access Road) – Placentia, St. Bride's	
Chapel Arm	9.9	6.2	Route 1 (TCH) – Clarenville, St. John's; Route 201 north (Osprey Trail) – Chapel Arm, Norman's Cove	Exit 27 on Route 1; eastern terminus; southern terminus of Route 201
1.000 mi = 1.609 km; 1.000 km = 0.621 mi
