= Patrick's Cove-Angels Cove =

- Local service district / designated place
- Location of Patrick's Cove-Angels Cove in Newfoundland
- Coordinates: 47°02′N 54°07′W
- Country: Canada
- Province: Newfoundland and Labrador
- Census division: Division 1
- Census subdivision: Subdivision C

Population (2006)
  - Total: 97
- Time zone: UTC-3:30 (Newfoundland Time)
  - Summer (DST): UTC-2:30 (Newfoundland Daylight)
- Area code: 709
- Highways: Route 100

Patrick's Cove-Angels Cove is a local service district and designated place in the Canadian province of Newfoundland and Labrador. It is on the Cape Shore of the Avalon Peninsula. The area was first settled by James Coffey in the early 19th century. Coffey had moved to Newfoundland from County Waterford, Ireland to work at Placentia's Saunders and Sweetman firm (often referred to as Sweetman's). Sweetman's firm had sent some of their employees outward from Placentia to start farms in which to supply Sweetman's with produce. Coffey became the first resident of this community.

Coffey married a woman named Catherine McGrath, daughter of Bartholomew McGrath. Together they had ten children. One of these children, Ellen, married a man named James Follet. Follet commanded a schooner that traded on the Cape Shore, bringing provisions to the small communities and freighting their fish to St. John's.

Although Angel's Cove began primarily as a farming community, by 1870 the inhabitants had begun to fish as well, three fishing rooms becoming established by 1874. The first Post master was Henry Coffey. Today's Angel's Cove is made up entirely of those with the last name Coffey and had a population of 51 in 1981. In 1911 the population was 40, in 1951 there were 141 and in 1956 there were 166 people there.

The Patrick's Cove-Angels Cove DPL had a population of 97 in the Canada 2006 Census.

== History ==
Around 1804, the valley of Patrick's Cove, then known as Devil's Cove was settled by a young man from County Tipperary, Ireland. Bartholomew McGrath made this sheltered cove his home, and following his marriage to Catherine Ryan from North Harbour, raised his family of four sons and three daughters there.

When Bartley arrived in Newfoundland he had no background in fishing, being a farmer by profession. However, by 1849 he was going to sea on the bankers (fishing vessels) and his sons had learned to build boats and were beginning to fish locally. By 1845 there were four small skiffs at Patrick's Cove, and as the years passed the number grew to seventeen. At the peak of the fishing season, men came from the Barasways and Point Verd to assist. These were called 'summer men', they came to help and in exchange for services they received food and free board. Today, those who fish, do so out of St. Bride's.

The name Devil's Cove, was changed to Patrick's Cove by Bartholomew's son Bartley on the occasion of the birth of his son, Patrick. The name has help through the years and just about every family in Patrick's Cove with the surname McGrath has a son named Patrick. In the 1800s Patrick's Cove had all McGrath living there.

== Geography ==
Patrick's Cove-Angels Cove is in Newfoundland within Subdivision C of Division No. 1.

== Demographics ==
As a designated place in the 2016 Census of Population conducted by Statistics Canada, Patrick's Cove-Angels Cove recorded a population of 56 living in 32 of its 72 total private dwellings, a change of −3.4% from its 2011 population of 58. With a land area of 11.63 km^{2} (4.49 sq mi), it had a population density of 4.8/km^{2} (12.5/sq mi) in 2016.

== Government ==
Patrick's Cove-Angels Cove is a local service district (LSD) that is governed by a committee responsible for the provision of certain services to the community.

== See also ==
- Cape Shore
- List of communities in Newfoundland and Labrador
- List of designated places in Newfoundland and Labrador
- List of local service districts in Newfoundland and Labrador
