= Newfoundland and Labrador Route 102 =

Highway in Newfoundland and Labrador

Route 102
- Fox Harbour Road; Ship Harbour Road

Route information
- Maintained by Newfoundland and Labrador Department of Transportation and Infrastructure
- Length: 24.0 km (14.9 mi)

Major junctions
- South end: Route 100 in Dunville
- North end: Ship Cove

Location
- Country: Canada
- Province: Newfoundland and Labrador

Highway system
- Highways in Newfoundland and Labrador
| ← Route 101 | → Route 201 |

Route 102 is a 24.0-kilometre-long (14.9 mi) north–south highway along the northwestern corner of the Avalon Peninsula on the island of Newfoundland. It connects the communities of Fox Harbour and Ship Harbour with the town of Dunville and Route 100 (Cape Shore Highway). Between Dunville and Fox Harbour, the road is known as Fox Harbour Road, and between Fox Harbour and Ship Harbour, it is known as Ship Harbour Road.

== Route description ==
Route 102 begins at an intersection with Route 100 in downtown Dunville and heads north through neighbourhoods before leaving town and winding its through wooded areas, where it passes by the site of Villa Marie. The highway now passes through Fox Harbour before coming closer to the coastline and winding its through hilly terrain. Route 102 now passes along the water's edge as it passes through Ship Harbour, where the road dead ends in a neighbourhood.

== Major intersections ==
| Location | km | mi | Destinations | Notes |
|---|---|---|---|---|
| Dunville | 0.0 | 0.0 | Route 100 (Argentia Access) to Route 1 (TCH) – Argentia, St. Bride's | Southern terminus |
| Ship Harbour | 23.5 | 14.6 | Atlantic Charter Road - Atlantic Charter National Historic Site | |
| Ship Harbour | 24.0 | 14.9 | Dead End | Northern terminus |
1.000 mi = 1.609 km; 1.000 km = 0.621 mi
