= Newfoundland and Labrador Route 81 =

Highway in Newfoundland and Labrador

Route 81
- Markland Road

Route information
- Maintained by Newfoundland and Labrador Department of Transportation and Infrastructure
- Length: 28.0 km (17.4 mi)

Major junctions
- South end: Route 91 in Colinet
- North end: Route 1 (TCH) / Route 80 in Whitbourne

Location
- Country: Canada
- Province: Newfoundland and Labrador

Highway system
- Highways in Newfoundland and Labrador
← Route 80	→ Route 90

Route 81, also known as Markland Road, is a 28.0-kilometre-long (17.4 mi) north–south highway on the Avalon Peninsula of Newfoundland, connecting the towns of Colinet and Whitbourne via Markland.

In 2019, Route 81 was voted third Worst Road in Atlantic Canada by the Canadian Automobile Association's Worst Roads list. Markland Road had been on the list for the last decade.

== Route description ==
Route 81 begins along the banks of the Colinet River in Colinet at an intersection with Route 91 (Old Placentia Highway). It heads north to leave Colinet and become a gravel road as it passes through hilly terrain for the next several kilometres. It crosses over several small brooks before becoming paved again and passing through farmland. The highway now crosses over the Hodge River before passing through Markland. Route 81 continues north to pass along the banks of Junction Pond to enter Whitbourne, where it passes through neighbourhoods before making a sharp left onto Main Road in downtown. It now passes by several businesses and passes through some more rural areas before coming to an end at an interchange between Route 1 (Trans Canada Highway, Exit 28), and Route 80 (Trinity Road).

== Major intersections ==
Location	km	mi	Destinations	Notes
Colinet	0.0	0.0	Route 91 (Old Placentia Highway) – St. Catherine's, Placentia	Southern terminus
Whitbourne	28.0	17.4	Route 1 (TCH) – Clarenville, St. John's; Route 80 north (Trinity Road) – Dildo	Exit 28 on Route 1; northern terminus; southern terminus of Route 80
1.000 mi = 1.609 km; 1.000 km = 0.621 mi
