= Agnes Walsh =

Canadian poet, playwright, actor and storyteller (born 1950)

- Born: 1950 (age 75–76); Placentia, Newfoundland and Labrador, Canada
- Occupations: Poet; playwright; actor; storyteller

Agnes Walsh (born 1950) is a Canadian poet, playwright, actor and storyteller from Newfoundland and Labrador.

Born in Placentia, Newfoundland and Labrador, Walsh has won Newfoundland and Labrador Arts and Letters awards for poetry as well as TickleAce poetry and ballad writing awards. Her poems have been translated into French and Portuguese. She has toured Canada, the eastern United States, Portugal, and Ireland reading from her work.

Walsh is also the founder of the Tramore Theatre Troupe on the Cape Shore of Placentia Bay, an ensemble dedicated to preserving and presenting the oral history of that area. The group has performed to packed houses in both Newfoundland and Ireland and hosted Irish cultural exchanges to the Cape Shore area.

She has adapted Nobel Prize-winning Icelandic author Halldór Laxness's The Atom Station for the theatre.

In 2006, Walsh was named the first poet laureate of St. John's.

== Bibliography ==
- In the Old Country of My Heart (1996)
- In the Old Country of My Heart audiobook edition (2003)
- Going Around with Bachelors (2007)
- Answer Me Home: Plays from Tramore Theatre (2011)
- Oderin (2018)
- The Wind Has Robbed the Legs Off a Madwoman (2024)
