= Newfoundland and Labrador Route 93 =

Highway in Newfoundland and Labrador, Canada

Route 93
- Mount Carmel Road

Route information
- Maintained by Newfoundland and Labrador Department of Transportation and Infrastructure
- Length: 17.7 km (11.0 mi)

Major junctions
- West end: Route 91 in Colinet
- East end: Route 90 in Mount Carmel-Mitchells Brook-St. Catherines

Location
- Country: Canada
- Province: Newfoundland and Labrador

Highway system
- Highways in Newfoundland and Labrador
| ← Route 92 | → Route 94 |

Route 93, also known as Mount Carmel Road, is a 17.7-kilometre-long (11.0 mi) east–west highway on the Avalon Peninsula of Newfoundland.

== Route description ==
Route 93 begins along the banks of the Colinet River in Colinet at an intersection with Route 91 (Old Placentia Highway). It heads south through neighbourhoods before passing through rural areas for several kilometres. The highway then turns east as it passes through Harricott to cross over some hills to enter Mount Carmel-Mitchells Brook-St. Catherines and pass through the Mount Carmel portion of town. Route 93 turns north to wind its way along the Salmonier Arm of St. Mary's Bay for several kilometres to enter the St. Carthrines portion of town before coming to an end at an intersection with Route 90 (Salmonier Line), where the Salmonier Arm becomes the Salmonier River.

== Major intersections ==
| Location | km | mi | Destinations | Notes |
|---|---|---|---|---|
| Colinet | 0.0 | 0.0 | Route 91 (Old Placentia Highway) – Placentia, Cataracts Provincial Park, St. Catherine's | Western terminus |
| St. Catherine's | 17.7 | 11.0 | Route 90 (Salmonier Line) – Holyrood, St. Mary's, St. Vincent's | Eastern terminus |
1.000 mi = 1.609 km; 1.000 km = 0.621 mi
