= Division No. 1, Subdivision C, Newfoundland and Labrador =

Subdivision 1C
- Unorganized territory
- Division No. 1, Subdivision C
- Location within Newfoundland
- Country: Canada
- Province: Newfoundland and Labrador
- Census division: Division 1

Government
  - MHA: Sherry Gambin-Walsh (LIB, Placentia—St. Mary's)
  - MP: Jonathan Rowe (CON, Terra Nova-The Peninsulas)

Area
  - Land: 833.08 km^{2} (321.65 sq mi)

Population (2016)
  - Total: 100
  - Density: 0.1/km^{2} (0.26/sq mi)
- Time zone: UTC-3:30 (Newfoundland Time)
  - Summer (DST): UTC-2:30 (Newfoundland Daylight)
- Highways: Route 100

Division No. 1, Subdivision C is an unorganized subdivision on the Avalon Peninsula in Newfoundland and Labrador, Canada. It is in Division 1 and contains the unincorporated communities of Cape St. Mary's, Cuslett, Gooseberry Cove, Great Barasway, Lears Cove, Patrick's Cove-Angels Cove, Ship Cove and Stoney House.

Cape St. Mary's and Bird Island

Cape St. Mary's has a seabird sanctuary that is about forty miles by road from Placentia. In his 1969 book Newfoundland, Harold Horwood explained that this was one of the few places in Newfoundland where people could see large groups of seabirds without needing a boat. Some of the birds found here include gannets, murres, and kittiwakes. Bird Island is not actually an island, but a large piece of cliff that is still connected to the land at the bottom. The tall cliffs give the birds a safe place to build their nests and stay away from animals that might harm them. Horwood also explained that visitors could walk across the open land to see the birds. During late June and early July, the area becomes very busy as the birds build their nests.

== Cuslett ==
46.963°N 54.157°W Cuslett is a settlement by the Atlantic Ocean in Newfoundland and Labrador. Its population in 2013: 37.

== Gooseberry Cove (Placentia Bay) ==
47°04′12″N 54°5′32″W

Historical populations Gooseberry Cove
Year	Pop.
1857	13
1874	11
1891	12
1911	21
1935	10
1951	9

Gooseberry Cove was a small town located on the south-east side of Placentia Bay in Newfoundland and Labrador. The town was first settled by farmers to supply food to the fishermen of the Sweetmans' firm based in nearby Placentia. Because of a lack of available land, distance from fishing grounds and a poor harbour the population remained small, peaking at 21 in 1911. Because of the small population there was never a school, church or medical facility built in Gooseberry Cove. The community was abandoned in the 1950s. In 1980 the beach at Gooseberry Cove, one of the few naturally sandy beaches in Newfoundland, was designated a public recreational beach.

== Great Barasway ==
47.128°N 54.062°W Great Barasway is a settlement in Newfoundland and Labrador.

== Patrick's Cove-Angels Cove ==
see: Patrick's Cove-Angels Cove
