= Markland, Newfoundland and Labrador =

Canadian designated place

Coordinates: 47.378°N 53.546°W

Location of Markland in Newfoundland and Labrador

Markland is a local service district and designated place in the Canadian province of Newfoundland and Labrador.

== History ==
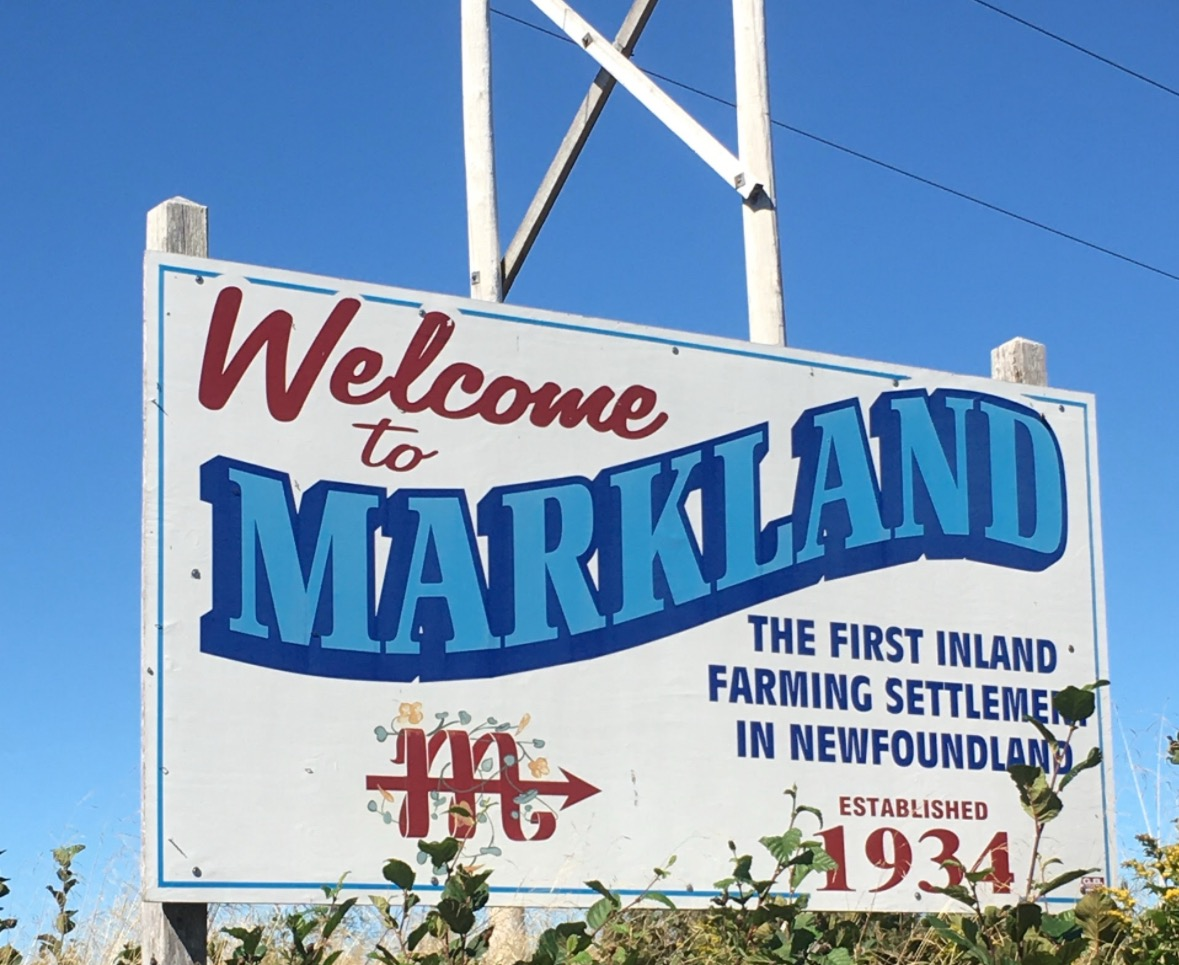
Sign located in Markland, Newfoundland and Labrador.

Markland was founded as an experimental land settlement or agricultural community in 1934. The "Markland experiment" began in the spring of that year when a group of private citizens in St. John's vouched for the Commission of Government to give them relief payments for farming and agriculture. The Commission advanced payments to the trustees and offered a block of land for the settlement on the road between Whitbourne and Colinet. The name Markland was chosen from "forest land" of the Viking (Norse) from the Icelandic Sagas. The Vikings that chose that name was Leif Erikson and Bjarni Herjólfsson on their exploration to Vinland.

Despite initial success, by 1940 the government was not participating as actively in the land settlement scheme and other aspects of the experiment, such as communal farming and interdenominational schooling, had been abandoned. As employment prospects increased in Newfoundland during World War II, many families ceased farming. Markland residents were employed at Argentia after 1941 and by the end of the war, Markland was becoming less of a farming community.

== Geography ==
Markland is in Newfoundland within Subdivision X of Division No. 1. Markland's landscape consists of mostly marshes and thickly wooded areas. Hodge River runs through it.

=== Flora and fauna ===
Wildlife in Markland includes moose, squirrels, rabbits, birds, owls & coyotes.

== Demographics ==
As a designated place in the 2016 Census of Population conducted by Statistics Canada, Markland recorded a population of 223 living in 98 of its 126 total private dwellings, a change of 13.8% from its 2011 population of 196. With a land area of 20.74 km^{2} (8.01 sq mi), it had a population density of 10.8/km^{2} (27.8/sq mi) in 2016.

== Attractions ==
Rodrigues Markland Cottage Winery is located in Markland. They use local hand-picked berries such as blueberry and bakeapple, to produce wine. This Winery offers tours and wine tasting to visitors all year round.

The locals enjoy riding snowmobiles and quad bikes, as well as fishing and boating.

== Government ==
Markland is a local service district (LSD) that is governed by a committee responsible for the provision of certain services to the community. The chair of the LSD committee is Kelly Leonard.

== Notable people ==
Actress and model Shannon Tweed was born in St. John's, but raised in Markland.

== See also ==
- List of communities in Newfoundland and Labrador
- List of designated places in Newfoundland and Labrador
- List of local service districts in Newfoundland and Labrador
