= Chance Cove =

- Town
- Location of Chance Cove in Newfoundland
- Coordinates: 47°40′01.39″N 53°48′48.31″W
- Country: Canada
- Province: Newfoundland and Labrador

Area
  - Land: 18.2 km^{2} (7.0 sq mi)

Population (2021)
  - Total: 213
  - Density: 14.1/km^{2} (37/sq mi)
- Time zone: UTC-3:30 (Newfoundland Time)
  - Summer (DST): UTC-2:30 (Newfoundland Daylight)
- Area code: 709
- Highways: Route 1 (TCH); Route 201

Chance Cove is a town in the Canadian province of Newfoundland and Labrador. The town had a population of 213 in the Canada 2021 Census.

The Chance Cove Coastal Hiking Trail is located in the community.

== Demographics ==
In the 2021 Census of Population conducted by Statistics Canada, Chance Cove had a population of 213 living in 111 of its 129 total private dwellings, a change of −16.8% from its 2016 population of 256. With a land area of 18.14 km^{2} (7.00 sq mi), it had a population density of 11.7/km^{2} (30.4/sq mi) in 2021.

== See also ==
- List of cities and towns in Newfoundland and Labrador
