= Mount Carmel-Mitchells Brook-St. Catherines =

- Town
- Interactive map of Mount Carmel-Mitchells Brook-St. Catherines
- Coordinates: 47°11′11″N 53°25′23″W
- Country: Canada
- Province: Newfoundland and Labrador

Area
  - Total: 61.55 km^{2} (23.76 sq mi)

Population (2021)
  - Total: 382
  - Density: 5.7/km^{2} (15/sq mi)
- Time zone: UTC-3:30 (Newfoundland Time)
  - Summer (DST): UTC-2:30 (Newfoundland Daylight)
- Area code: 709
- Highways: Route 90; Route 91; Route 93
- Website: https://townofmountcarmel.ca/

Mount Carmel-Mitchells Brook-St. Catherines is a town in the Canadian province of Newfoundland and Labrador. The town had a population of 382 in the Canada 2021 Census.

== Demographics ==
In the 2021 Census of Population conducted by Statistics Canada, Mount Carmel-Mitchells Brook-St. Catherine's had a population of 382 living in 203 of its 385 total private dwellings, a change of 9.5% from its 2016 population of 349. With a land area of 60.76 km^{2} (23.46 sq mi), it had a population density of 6.3/km^{2} (16.3/sq mi) in 2021.

== See also ==
- List of cities and towns in Newfoundland and Labrador
