= Fox Harbour, Newfoundland and Labrador =

Fox Harbour
- Town
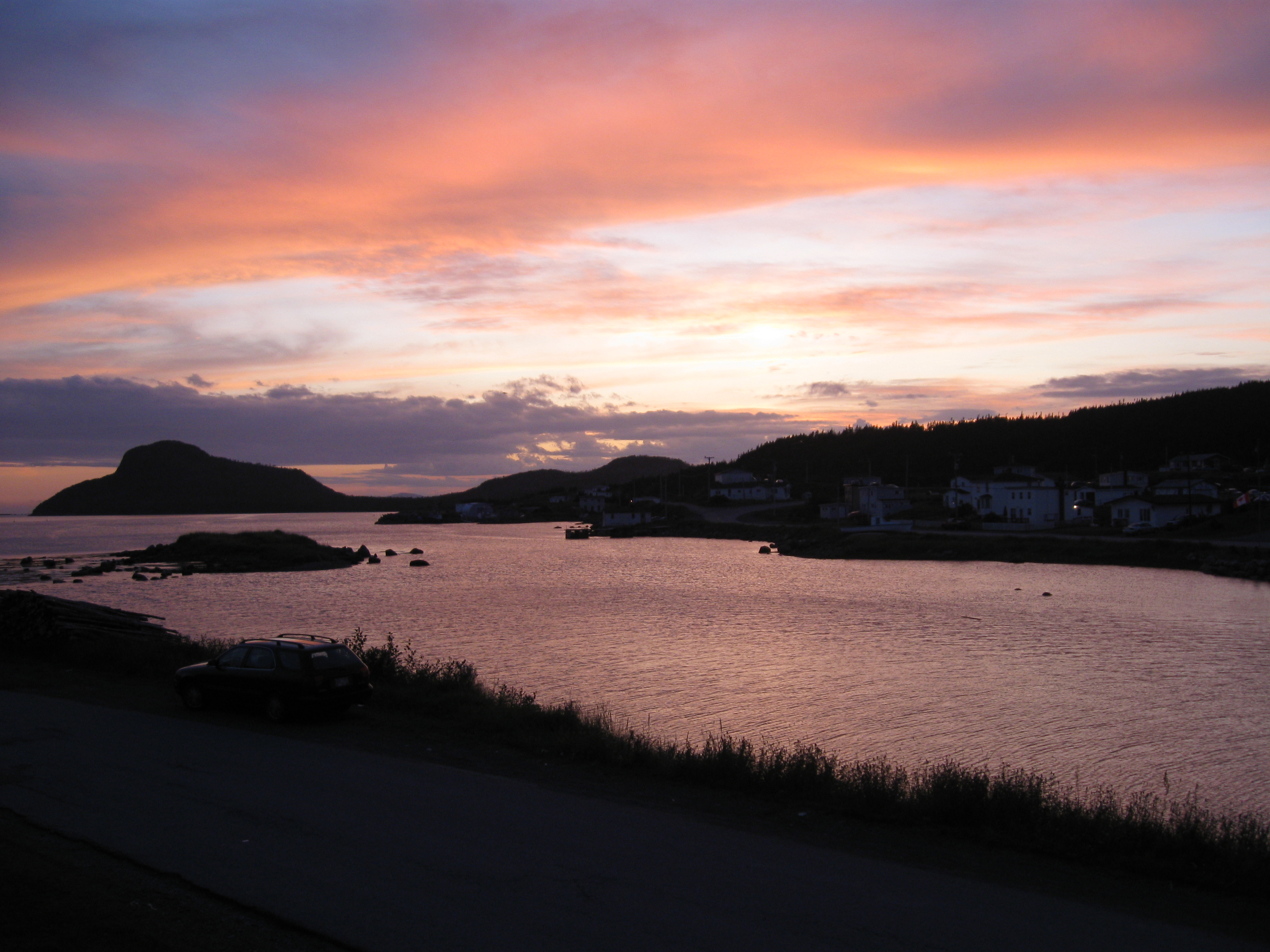
- Fox Harbour at Sunset, Summer 2009

- Location of Fox Harbour Fox Harbour (Canada)
- Coordinates: 47°19′17″N 53°52′58″W
- Country: Canada
- Province: Newfoundland and Labrador
- Settled: early 1800s
- Incorporated: 1964

Population (2021)
  - Total: 226
- Time zone: UTC−03:30 (NST)
  - Summer (DST): UTC−02:30 (NDT)
- Area code: 709
- Highways: Route 102

Fox Harbour is a small community on the Avalon Peninsula of Newfoundland. According to Statistics Canada in 2011, the population was 270. It is surrounded by hills. It is located close to Argentia, the site of the Naval Station Argentia. According to some sources, Fox Harbour got its name from tales of foxes that came down from the surrounding hills and ate the drying fish on the flakes. As well, the community was called Little Glocester before it became officially named Fox Harbour.

== History ==
Fox Harbour started as a fishing community in the early 19th century by the three families of Matthew, Martin, and George Spurvey. However, fisherman from England and Ireland had come overseas to fish there seasonally since the 18th century. All of them returned to England in the 1820s except for a Matthew Spurvey. Other families had settled in Fox Harbour by then with the arrival of Healey, Kelly and Dreaddy families from Ireland in 1806. The population grew over time, and peaked at 746. Fox Harbour was incorporated in 1964, and the council building opened in 1969. The council building now incorporates the fire station, the library, museum, and the council office.

== Demographics ==
In the 2021 Census of Population conducted by Statistics Canada, Fox Harbour had a population of 226 living in 114 of its 136 total private dwellings, a change of −10.3% from its 2016 population of 252. With a land area of 19.81 km^{2} (7.65 sq mi), it had a population density of 11.4/km^{2} (29.5/sq mi) in 2021.

== Religion ==
The population of Fox Harbour is predominantly Roman Catholic. The Roman Catholic Church, the only church in Fox Harbour, was built in 1890. Before the church was built, the people of Fox Harbour had to boat to Argentia to attend church service. In October, 1919 the original church was torn down and a new church built. In 1945, Fox Harbour became a parish and was called Sacred Heart Parish. Fr. Penny was the first appointed parish priest. Recently the Fox Harbour parish joined with the Placentia area to become the Placentia Area Roman Catholic Cluster.

== Education ==
The first school established in Fox Harbour was in 1848. St. Regis was built in 1946 and expanded in 1956. High school students were initially schooled at Laval High School in Placentia. When St. Anne's Academy was opened, the high school students from St. Regis moved from Laval to St. Anne's which was closer to home. However, in the early 1990s St. Regis closed its doors and all students are now bused to St. Anne's Academy from kindergarten to grade six, and Laval from grade seven to grade twelve.

== The Fox Harbour Festival ==
In 1993 Fox Harbour had its first festival. It has been held every year since then. The festival is held in the last weekend of July.

It commences with a cemetery mass followed by a garden party on the Sunday previous to the festival week. During the following week many events are held, including dances for adults and children, and a concert. On Saturday, there is a softball tournament; all residents and visitors are invited to participate (usually in four teams). The turnout is good and the games are lively. Following the softball game a dance is held that night. On Sunday afternoon, a local variety show is held that includes all the local talent.

Local residents organize the event; they are called the Fox Harbour Festival Committee.

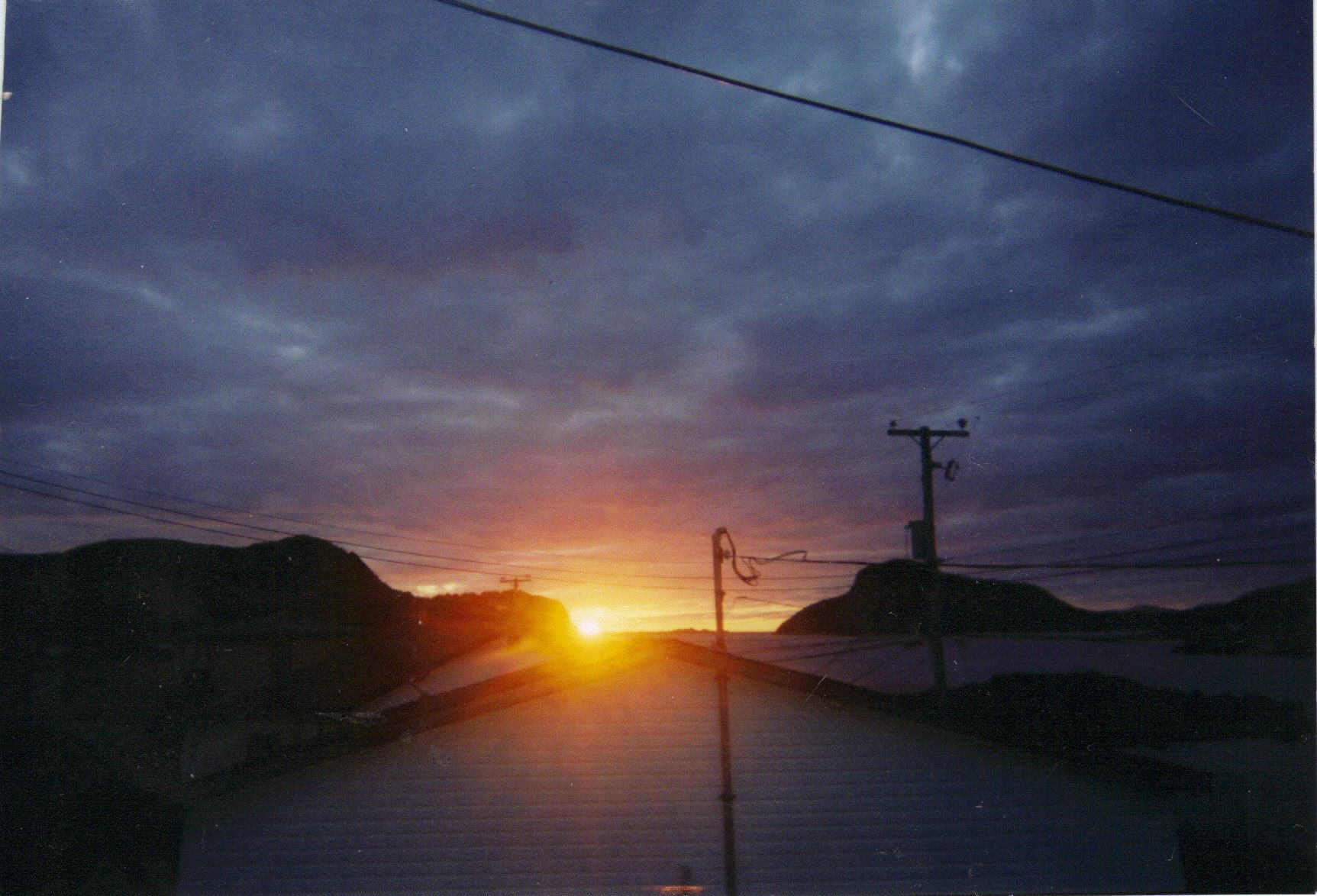
Fox Harbour Sunset

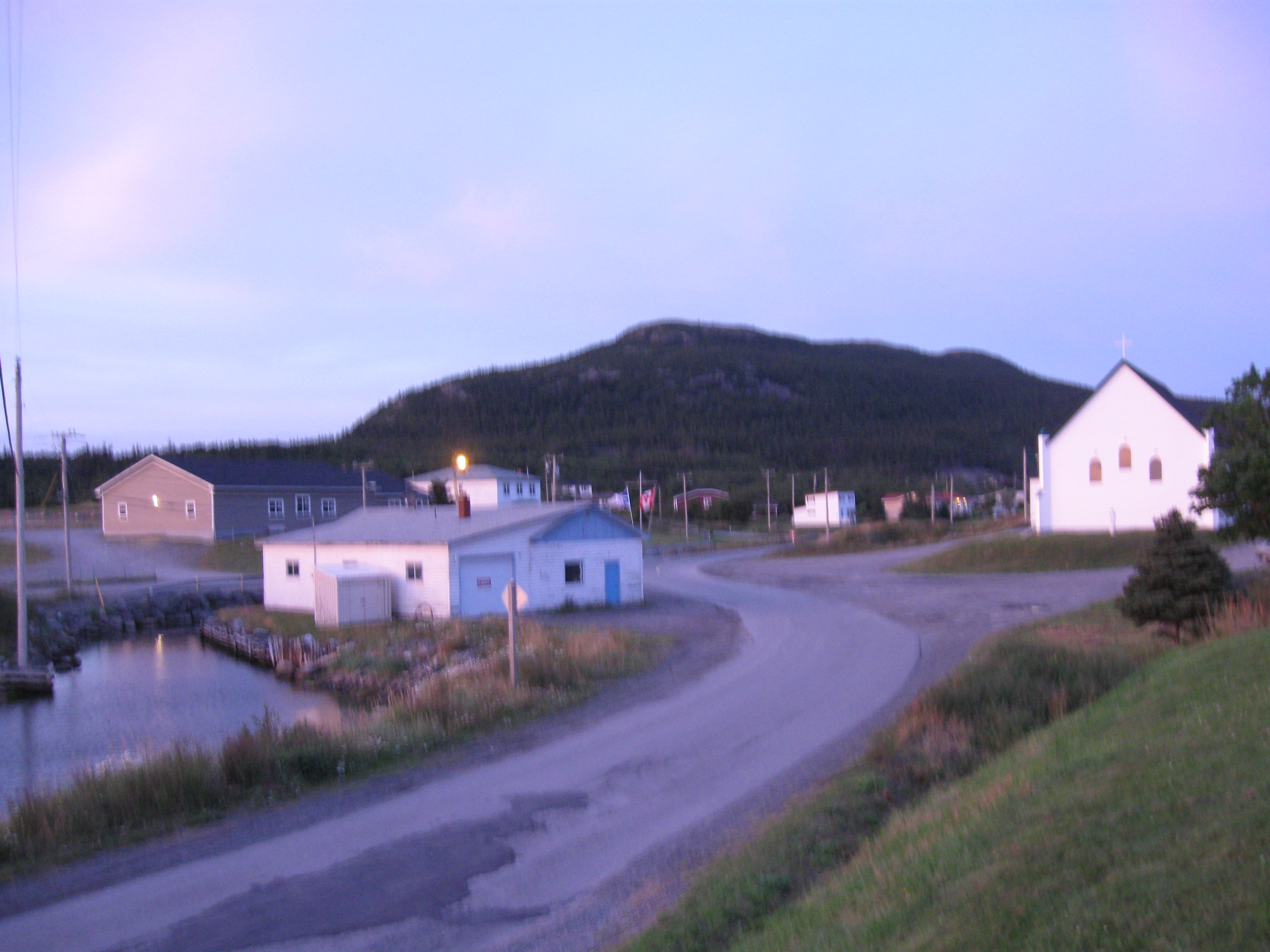
The Town of Fox Harbour

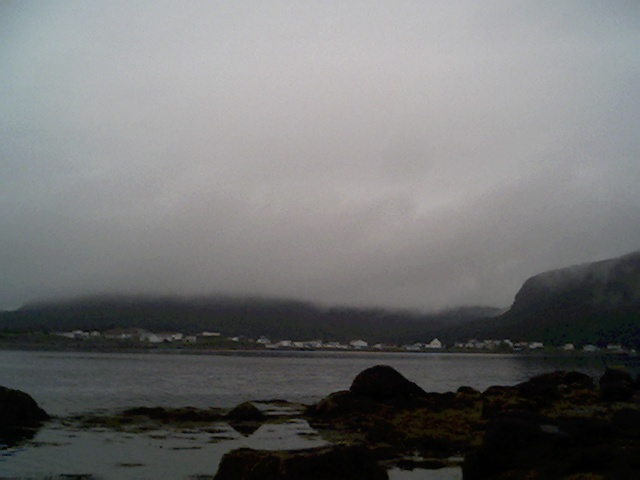
A Foggy Morning in Fox Harbour
