= Whitbourne, Newfoundland and Labrador =

Whitbourne
- Town
- Seal

- Location of Whitbourne in Newfoundland
- Coordinates: 47°25′N 53°32′W
- Country: Canada
- Province: Newfoundland and Labrador
- Census division: 1
- Settled: 1880

Area
  - Total: 21.41 km^{2} (8.27 sq mi)

Population (2021)
  - Total: 955
  - Density: 41.4/km^{2} (107/sq mi)
- Time zone: UTC-3:30 (Newfoundland Time)
  - Summer (DST): UTC-2:30 (Newfoundland Daylight)
- Area code: 709
- Highways: Route 1 (TCH); Route 80; Route 81; Route 100

Whitbourne is a town on the Avalon Peninsula in Newfoundland and Labrador, Canada in Division 1.

== History ==
Whitbourne is named after Sir Richard Whitbourne, one of the most colourful early settlers of Newfoundland. Whitbourne, unlike most communities on the Island of Newfoundland is inland. It was founded in about 1880 during the construction of the Newfoundland Railway and is considered Newfoundland's first inland town. The railway continued to be an important employer in the town until its abandonment in 1988, although its economic significance declined gradually throughout the twentieth century.

Sir Robert Bond, the prime minister from 1900 to 1909, played a role in the expansion and planning of the Town and developed an elaborate country home, the "Grange", there. The house is no longer in existence, but part of the estate is now Sir Robert Bond Park, which is noted for an unusual abundance of northern lichens including the relatively rare blue felt lichen (Degelia plumbea).

== Present day ==
The town of Whitbourne is located just off the Trans-Canada Highway on Route 81. It is located at the centre of three possible routes to visit the Avalon Peninsula. Route 80 is one of the two entrances to the Baccalieu Trail, Route 100 and Route 81 lead to the Marine Atlantic Ferry Service in Argentia and other parts of Placentia and St. Mary's Bays, and Route 1, the Trans Canada leads towards the second entrance to the Baccalieu Trail and the capital city of St. John's. As a result, there is a Provincial Visitor Information Centre on the Trans Canada near the town.

Whitbourne has many of the amenities of a small town that has traditionally been a regional service centre. The town's Wetlands Conservation Trail is of interest to many visitors.

== Demographics ==
In the 2021 Census of Population conducted by Statistics Canada, Whitbourne had a population of 955 living in 419 of its 584 total private dwellings, a change of 7.3% from its 2016 population of 890. With a land area of 21.51 km^{2} (8.31 sq mi), it had a population density of 44.4/km^{2} (115.0/sq mi) in 2021.

== Notable people ==
- Shannon Tweed, Canadian model and actress (born 1957)

== See also ==
- Long Harbour Nickel Processing Plant
- List of cities and towns in Newfoundland and Labrador
