= Point Lance =

Coordinates: 46.800°N 54.067°W

- Town
- Interactive map of Point Lance
- Country: Canada
- Province: Newfoundland and Labrador

Population (2021)
  - Total: 87
- Time zone: UTC-3:30 (Newfoundland Time)
  - Summer (DST): UTC-2:30 (Newfoundland Daylight)
- Area code: 709
- Highways: Route 100

Point Lance is a town in the Canadian province of Newfoundland and Labrador.

In 2016, Point Lance Road was voted Worst Road in Atlantic Canada by the Canadian Automobile Association's Worst Roads list.

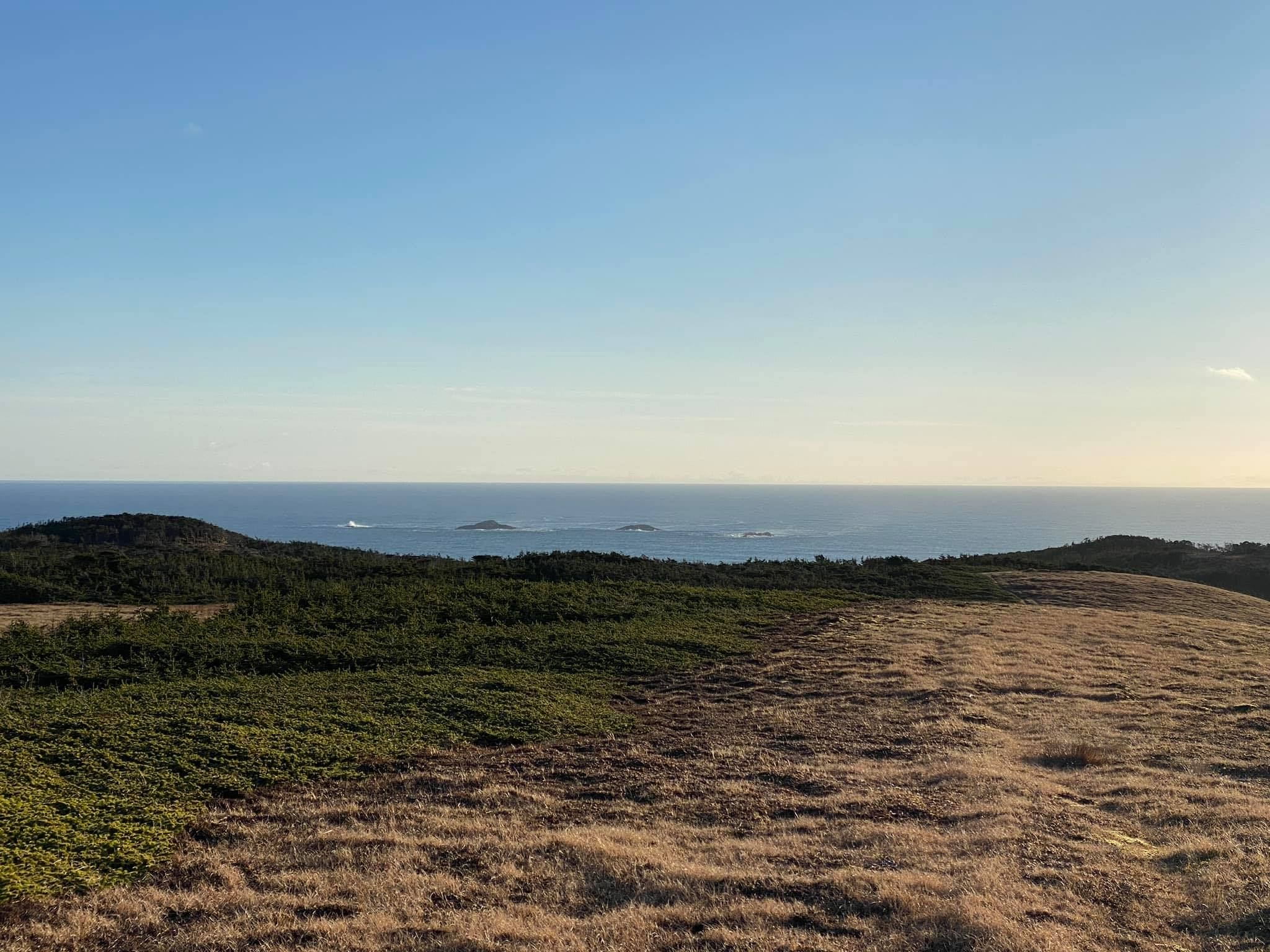

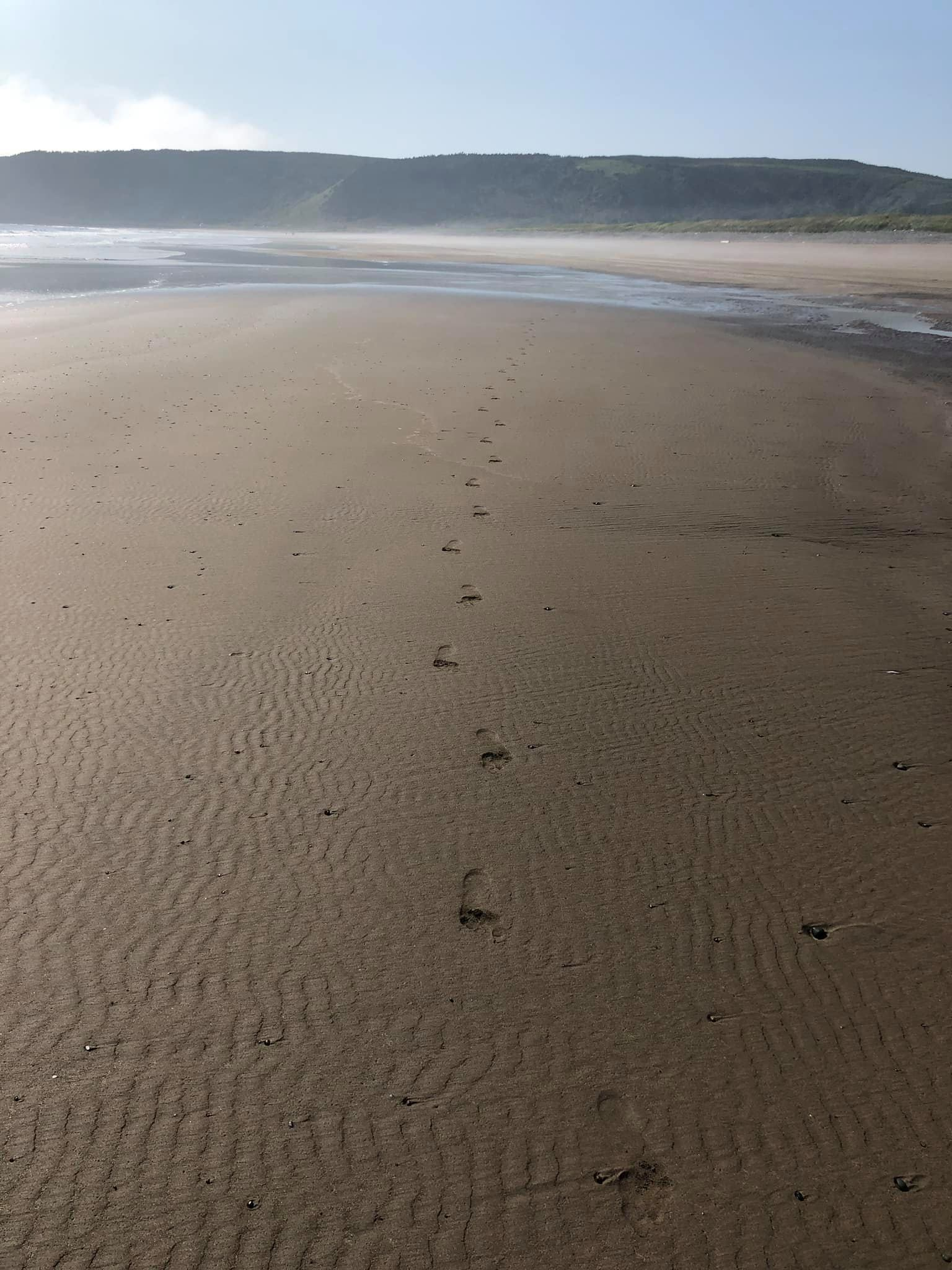
Beach

== Demographics ==
In the 2021 Census of Population conducted by Statistics Canada, Point Lance had a population of 87 living in 40 of its 48 total private dwellings, a change of −14.7% from its 2016 population of 102. With a land area of 28.29 km^{2} (10.92 sq mi), it had a population density of 3.1/km^{2} (8.0/sq mi) in 2021.

== Notable people ==
- Nick Careen, politician

== See also ==
- List of cities and towns in Newfoundland and Labrador
