= Cape St. Mary's Ecological Reserve =

Coastal nature reserve in Newfoundland

- IUCN category Ia (strict nature reserve)
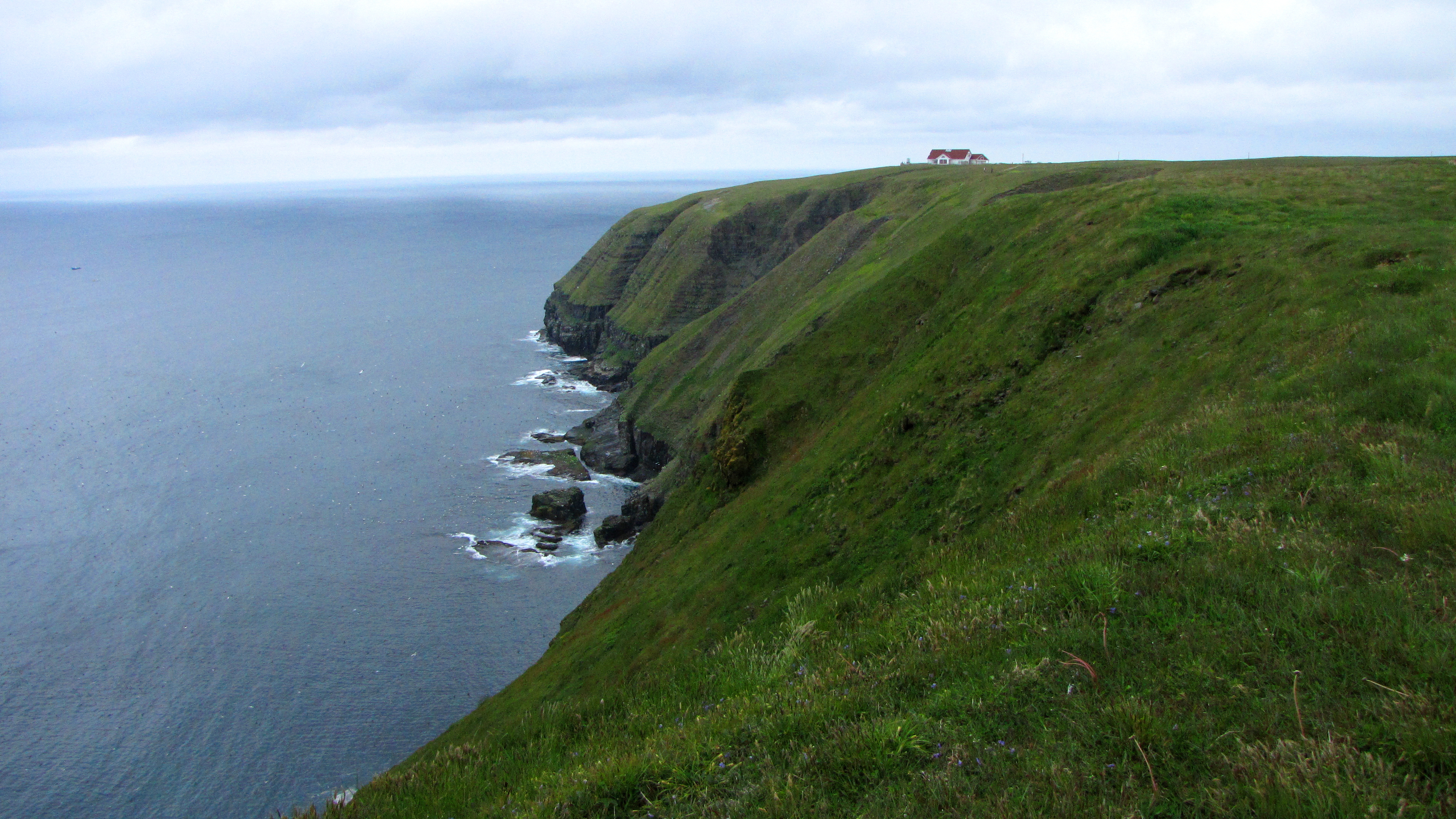
- Interpretive Centre from trail to Bird Rock
- Interactive map of Cape St. Mary's Ecological Reserve
- Location: Newfoundland and Labrador, Canada
- Nearest city: St. John's
- Coordinates: 46°49′55″N 54°09′57″W
- Area: 64 km^{2} (25 sq mi)
- Governing body: Newfoundland and Labrador, Dept. of Environment and Conservation

Location of Cape St. Mary's in Newfoundland

Cape St. Mary's Ecological Reserve is an ecological reserve located near Cape St. Mary's on the Cape Shore, on the southwestern Avalon Peninsula of Newfoundland.

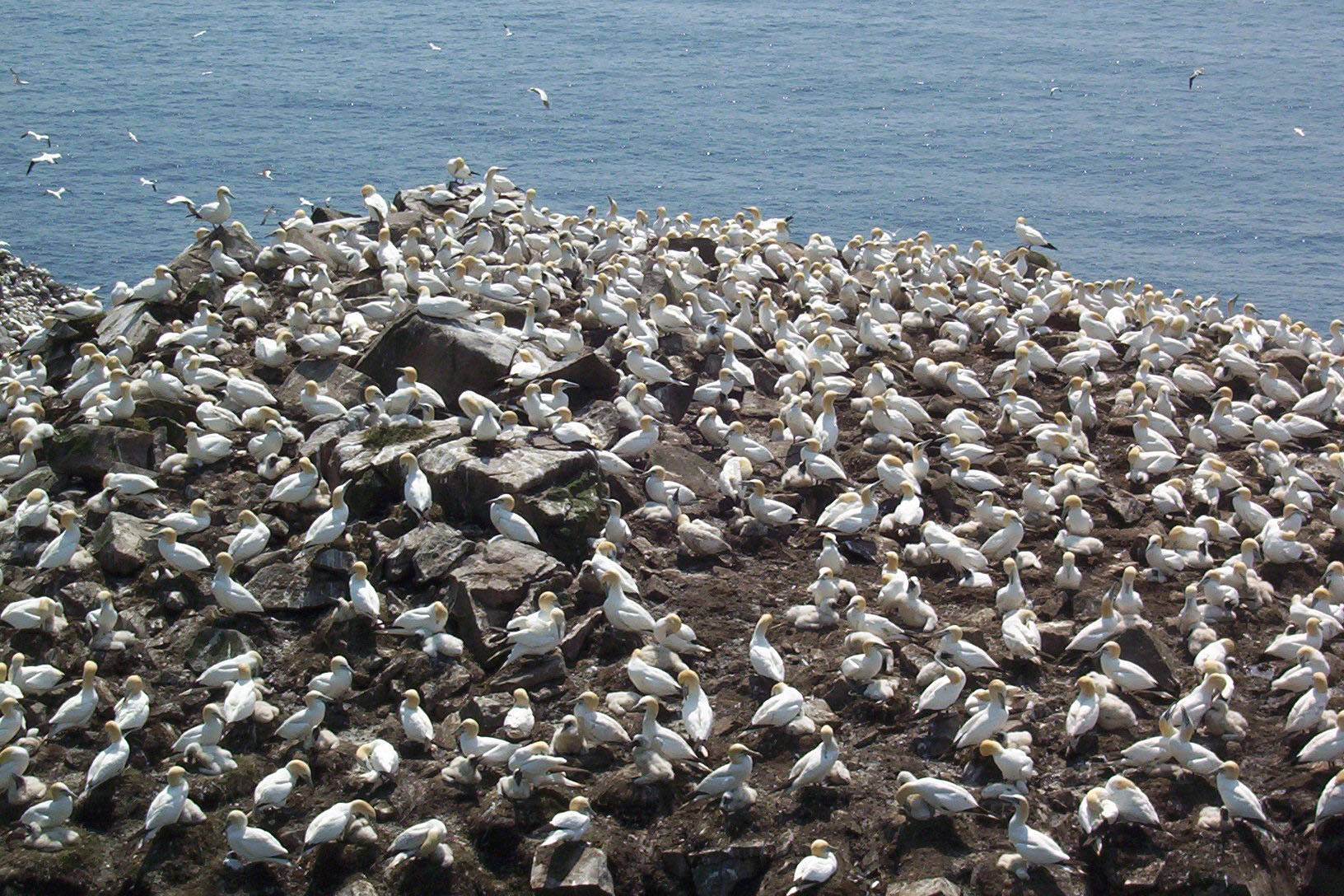
Northern gannets nesting on Bird Rock

It is home to one of North America's largest seabird colonies. The government of Newfoundland and Labrador estimates that the site is home to 30,000 northern gannets, 20,000 black-legged kittiwakes, 20,000 common murres, and 2,000 thick-billed murres, as well as dozens or hundreds of razorbill, and black guillemot breeding pairs. The ocean waters off the reserve also provides winter habitat for harlequin ducks, common eiders, scoters, and long-tailed ducks. The reserve has been designated an Important Bird Area by BirdLife International.

In addition to the numerous birds, humpback whales may be viewed from the heights during the annual capelin run.

The area protected by the reserve also includes sub-Arctic tundra, a mainly treeless plateau bordering the ocean.

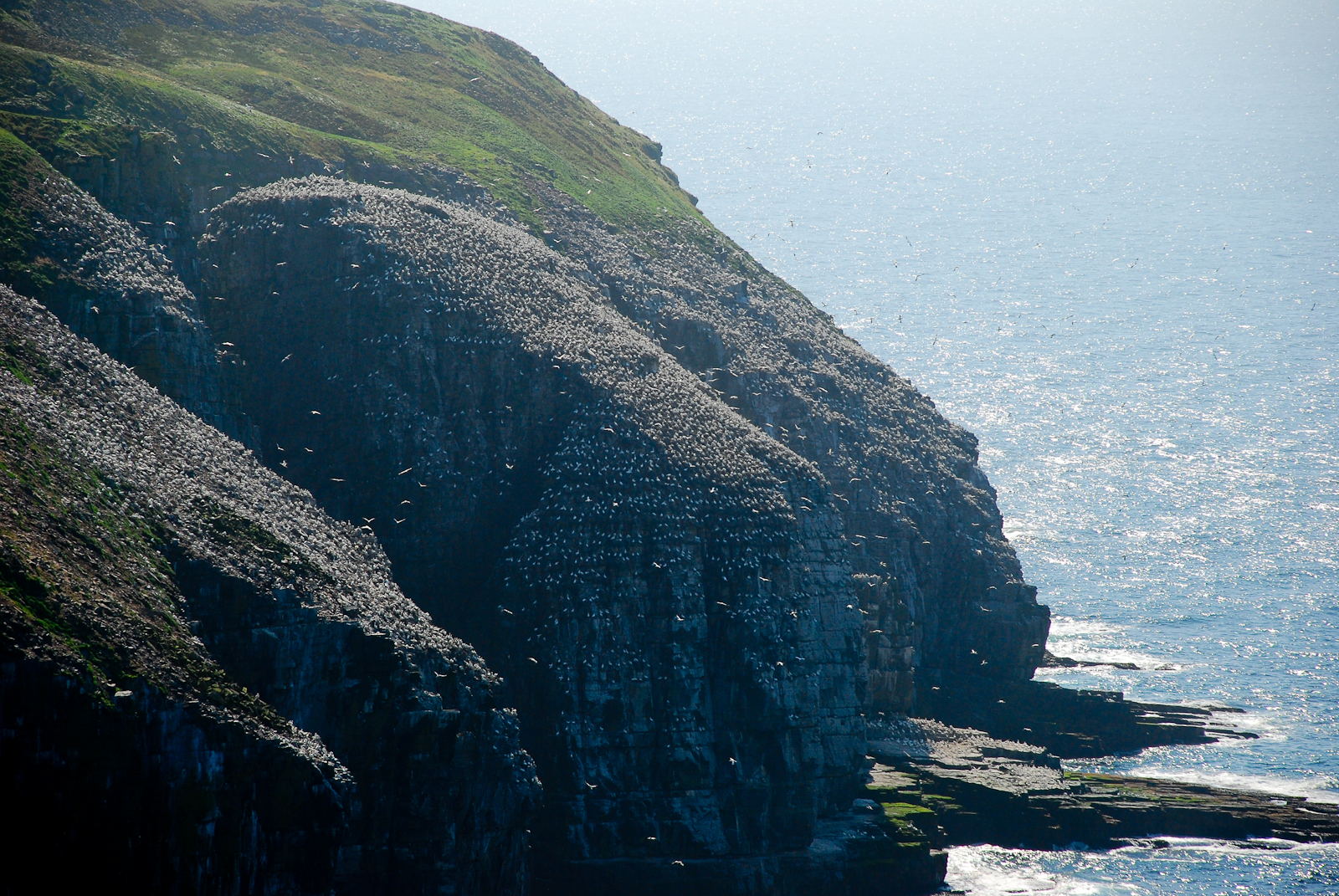
Nesting site from a distance, for scale

Facilities include an interpretive centre, parking and washrooms. A footpath from the centre leads to a viewing location a few hundred metres from "Bird Rock", a large sea stack with several thousand nesting gannets. Other nesting locations can also be viewed from shore.

A lighthouse is also located near the interpretive centre. As is true for many parts of Newfoundland, fog can be encountered at any time of day. Care should be taken near cliff edges.

Inside the interpretive centre, visitors will also find The Rookery Nature Store, operated by the Friends of Cape St. Mary's.
