= Branch, Newfoundland and Labrador =

Town of Branch
- Town
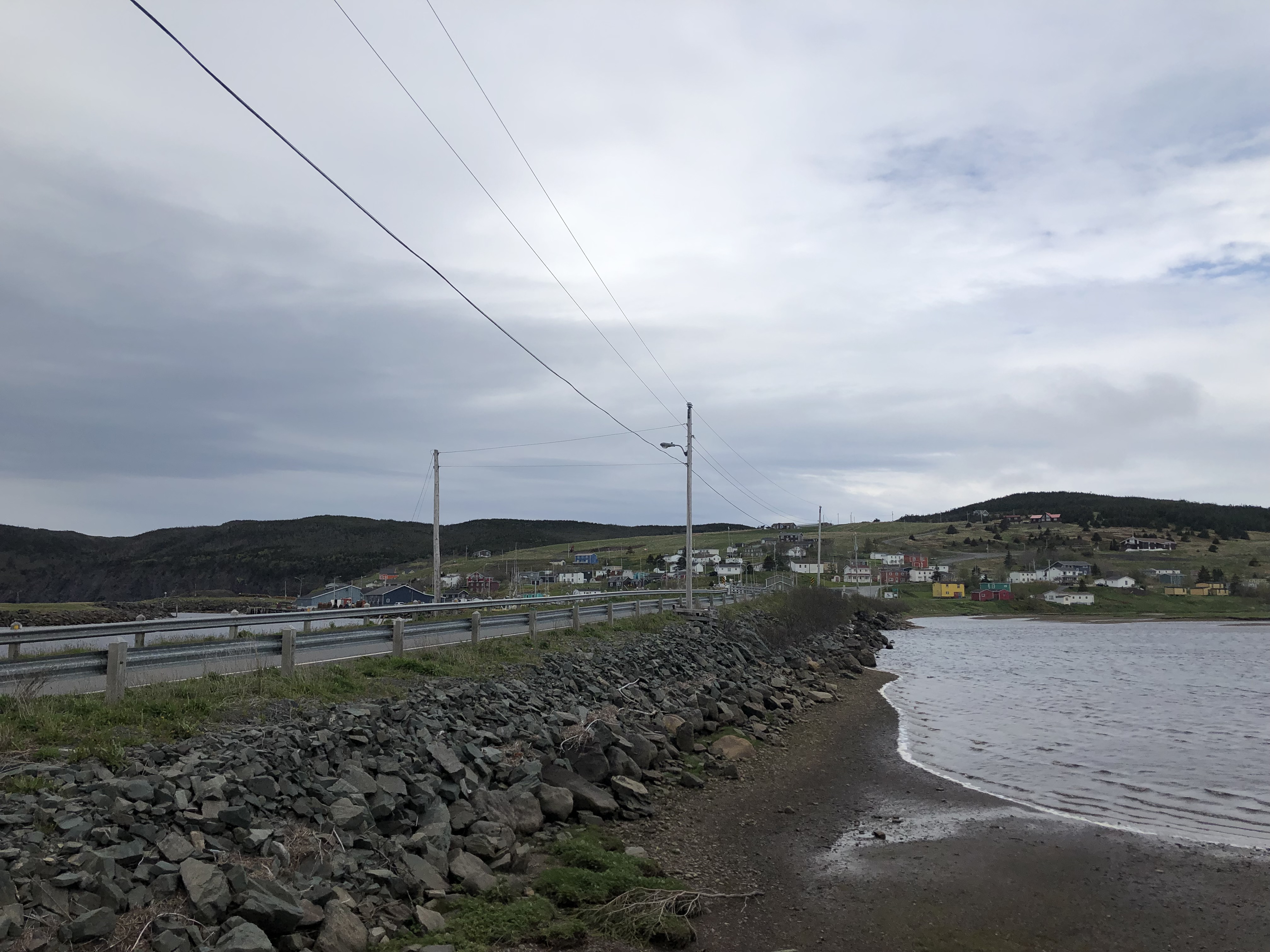
- View of the town of Branch from Route 92

- Location of Branch in Newfoundland
- Coordinates: 46°53′00″N 53°58′00″W
- Country: Canada
- Province: Newfoundland and Labrador

Government
  - Mayor: Kelly Power

Area
  - Land: 16.18 km^{2} (6.25 sq mi)

Population (2021)
  - Total: 223
  - Density: 13.8/km^{2} (36/sq mi)
- Time zone: UTC-3:30 (Newfoundland Time)
  - Summer (DST): UTC-2:30 (Newfoundland Daylight)
- Area code: 709
- Highways: Route 92; Route 100

The Town of Branch is an incorporated community of Newfoundland and Labrador, Canada and had a population of 223 (as of the 2021 census).

== Geography ==
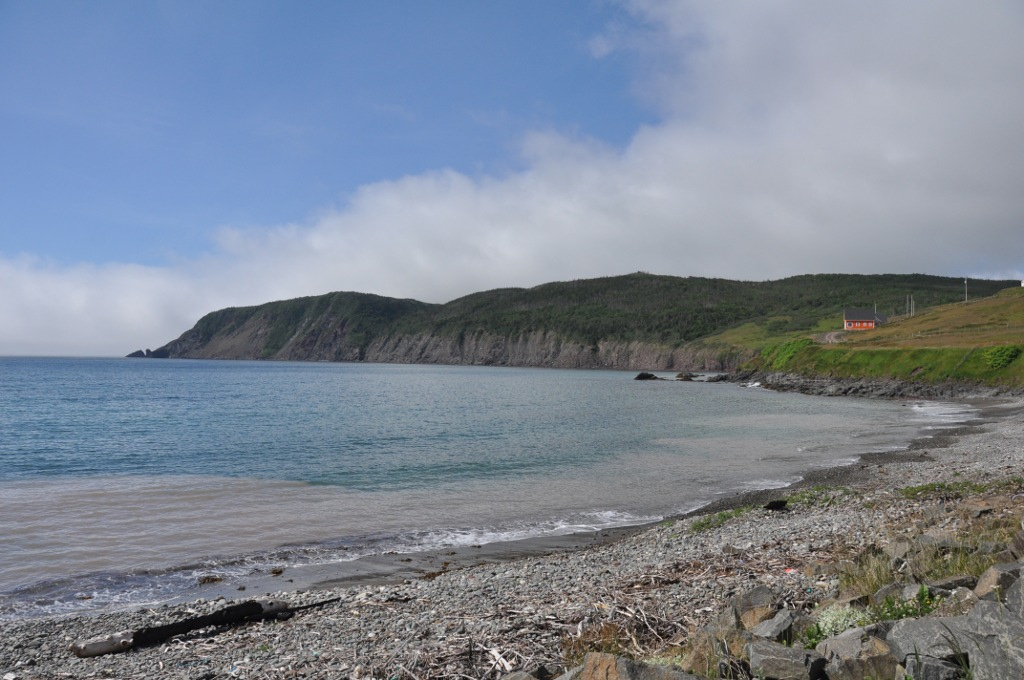
Branch Cove Fossiliferous Rocks

It is located on St. Mary's Bay and can be accessed via Route 100 or Route 92. Nearby communities include Point Lance and St. Bride's, Newfoundland and Labrador.

== History ==
The first settler of Branch was Thomas Nash, an Irish fisherman and boat builder. He arrived in Caplin Bay (Calvert) on the Southern Shore in 1765 and eventually came to Branch in the year 1790.

== Demographics ==
In the 2021 Census of Population conducted by Statistics Canada, Branch had a population of 177 living in 96 of its 142 total private dwellings, a change of −22.4% from its 2016 population of 228. With a land area of 16.18 km^{2} (6.25 sq mi), it had a population density of 10.9/km^{2} (28.3/sq mi) in 2021.
