= Bellevue Beach, Newfoundland and Labrador =

Bellevue Beach
- Local service district / designated place
- Location of Bellevue Beach Bellevue Beach (Canada)
- Coordinates: 47.627°N 53.784°W
- Country: Canada
- Province: Newfoundland and Labrador
- Region: Newfoundland
- Census division: 1
- Census subdivision: A

Government
  - Type: Unincorporated

Area
  - Land: 6.7 km^{2} (2.6 sq mi)

Population (2016)
  - Total: 69
- Time zone: UTC−03:30 (NST)
  - Summer (DST): UTC−02:30 (NDT)
- Area code: 709

Bellevue Beach is a local service district and designated place in the Canadian province of Newfoundland and Labrador.

== Geography ==
Bellevue Beach is in Newfoundland within Subdivision A of Division No. 1.

== Demographics ==
As a designated place in the 2016 Census of Population conducted by Statistics Canada, Bellevue Beach recorded a population of 69 living in 33 of its 98 total private dwellings, a change of −4.2% from its 2011 population of 72. With a land area of 6.7 km^{2} (2.6 sq mi), it had a population density of 10.3/km^{2} (26.7/sq mi) in 2016.

== Government ==
Bellevue Beach is a local service district (LSD) that is governed by a committee responsible for the provision of certain services to the community. The chair of the LSD committee is Shelia J. Fahey.

== See also ==
- List of communities in Newfoundland and Labrador
- List of designated places in Newfoundland and Labrador
- List of local service districts in Newfoundland and Labrador
