= Cape St. Mary's (Newfoundland and Labrador) =

Cape in southeast Newfoundland, Canada

Cape St. Mary's light
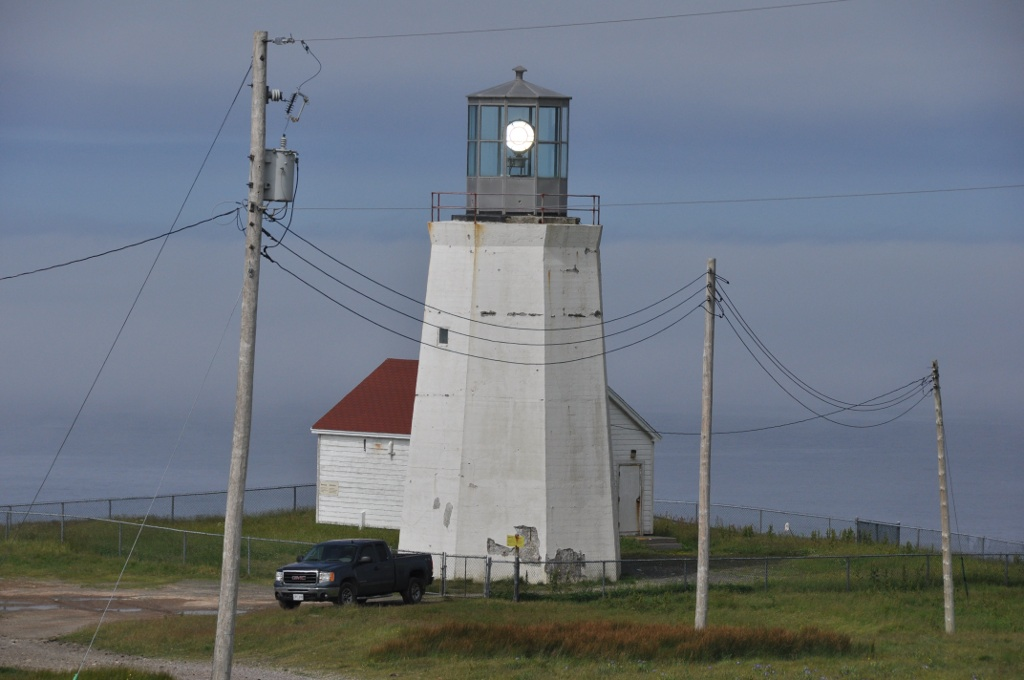
- Cape St. Mary's Lighthouse
- Location: Cape St. Mary's; Avalon Peninsula; Newfoundland; Canada
- Coordinates: 46°49′23.0″N 54°11′45.9″W

Tower
- Constructed: 1860
- Foundation: concrete base
- Construction: cast iron encased in concrete tower
- Height: 11.5 metres (38 ft)
- Shape: octagonal truncated tower with balcony and lantern
- Markings: white tower, grey metallic lantern
- Power source: solar power
- Operator: Cape St. Mary's Ecological Reserve
- Heritage: heritage lighthouse, recognized federal heritage building of Canada
- Fog signal: 1 blast every 30s.

Light
- Focal height: 119 metres (390 ft)
- Range: 21 nautical miles (39 km; 24 mi)
- Characteristic: Fl W 5s.

The headland of Cape St. Mary's is located at the southern tip of the south-western arm of the Avalon Peninsula of the island of Newfoundland in the Canadian province of Newfoundland and Labrador.

Cape St. Mary's is probably one of the most well known capes of the province, it has been written in song and history. There is a well known folk song about the Cape called "Let Me Fish Off Cape St. Mary's" by Otto P. Kelland.

The Cape St. Mary's Ecological Reserve is a wildlife reserve located east of the Cape. The Friends of Cape St. Mary's is a non-profit organisation of persons who are engaged in sharing the colourful and diverse elements of the ecological reserve.

== See also ==
- List of lighthouses in Canada
