= Southeast Placentia =

Settlement in Newfoundland, Canada

Coordinates: 47°13′02″N 53°56′17″W

Location of Southeast Placentia in Newfoundland and Labrador

Southeast Placentia is a settlement in the Canadian province of Newfoundland and Labrador. It is part of the Town of Placentia.
