= Long Harbour-Mount Arlington Heights =

Long Harbour–Mount Arlington Heights
- Town
- Location of Long Harbour–Mount Arlington Heights in Newfoundland
- Coordinates: 47°25′46″N 53°51′30″W
- Country: Canada
- Province: Newfoundland and Labrador

Population (2021)
  - Total: 185
- Time zone: UTC-3:30 (Newfoundland Time)
  - Summer (DST): UTC-2:30 (Newfoundland Daylight)
- Area code: 709
- Highways: Route 101; Route 202

Long Harbour–Mount Arlington Heights is a town in the Canadian province of Newfoundland and Labrador. The town had a population of 185 in the Canada 2021 Census.

The town is the site of the Long Harbour Nickel Processing Plant.

== Demographics ==
In the 2021 Census of Population conducted by Statistics Canada, Long Harbour-Mount Arlington Heights had a population of 185 living in 97 of its 167 total private dwellings, a change of −26% from its 2016 population of 250. With a land area of 18.33 km^{2} (7.08 sq mi), it had a population density of 10.1/km^{2} (26.1/sq mi) in 2021.

== See also ==
- List of cities and towns in Newfoundland and Labrador
