= Cataracts Provincial Park =

Provincial park in Newfoundland and Labrador, Canada

Coordinates: 47.242°N 53.629°W

Location in Newfoundland and Labrador

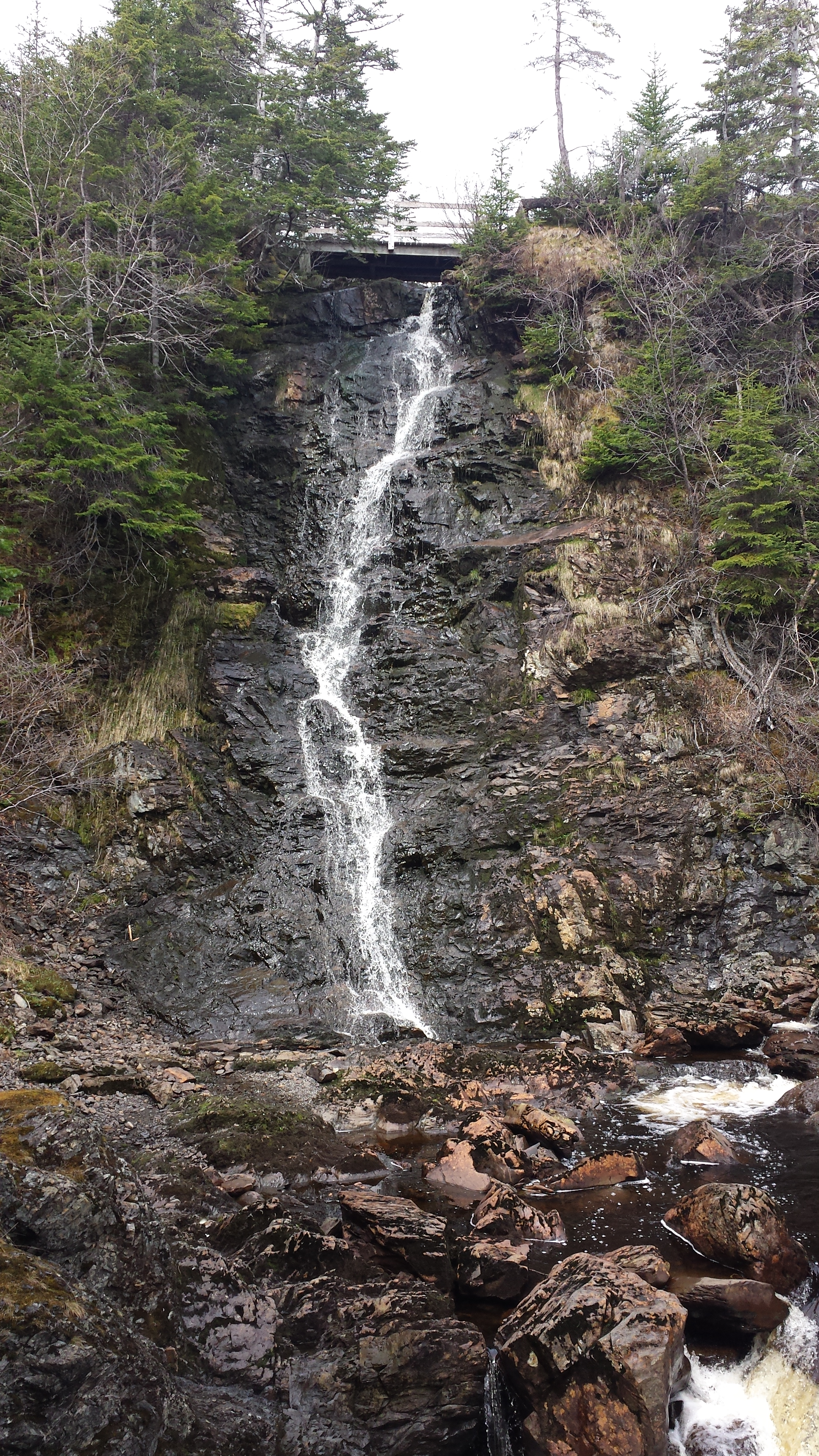
Waterfall in Cataracts Provincial Park, Colinet, Newfoundland and Labrador

Cataracts Provincial Park is located in Colinet, Newfoundland and Labrador, Canada, on the Avalon Peninsula southeast of Placentia. The park consists of a deep river gorge with two cascading waterfalls. There are stairs and walkways that allow visitors to descend the gorge and cross the river. Thirty five known mosses and liverworts in Newfoundland have been identified in this park. There are picnic sites and outhouse facilities available for visitor use.

Cataracts is intended for day use only; overnight camping is not permitted.
