= Bellevue, Newfoundland and Labrador =

Bellevue
- Local service district / designated place
- Location of Bellevue Bellevue (Canada)
- Coordinates: 47.634°N 53.718°W
- Country: Canada
- Province: Newfoundland and Labrador
- Region: Newfoundland
- Census division: 1
- Census subdivision: A

Government
  - Type: Unincorporated

Area
  - Land: 10.37 km^{2} (4.00 sq mi)

Population (2021)
  - Total: 237
- Time zone: UTC−03:30 (NST)
  - Summer (DST): UTC−02:30 (NDT)
- Area code: 709

Bellevue is a local service district and designated place in the Canadian province of Newfoundland and Labrador.

== Geography ==
Bellevue is in Newfoundland within Subdivision A of Division No. 1.

== Demographics ==
As a designated place in the 2021 Census of Population conducted by Statistics Canada, Bellevue recorded a population of 237 living in 81 of its 144 total private dwellings, a change of 48% from its 2011 population of 165. With a land area of 10.37 km^{2} (4.00 sq mi), it had a population density of 15.9/km^{2} (41.2/sq mi) in 2016.

== Government ==
Bellevue is a local service district (LSD) that is governed by a committee responsible for the provision of certain services to the community. The chair of the LSD committee is Gordon McCarthy.

== See also ==
- List of communities in Newfoundland and Labrador
- List of designated places in Newfoundland and Labrador
- List of local service districts in Newfoundland and Labrador
