= Colinet, Newfoundland and Labrador =

Colinet
- Town
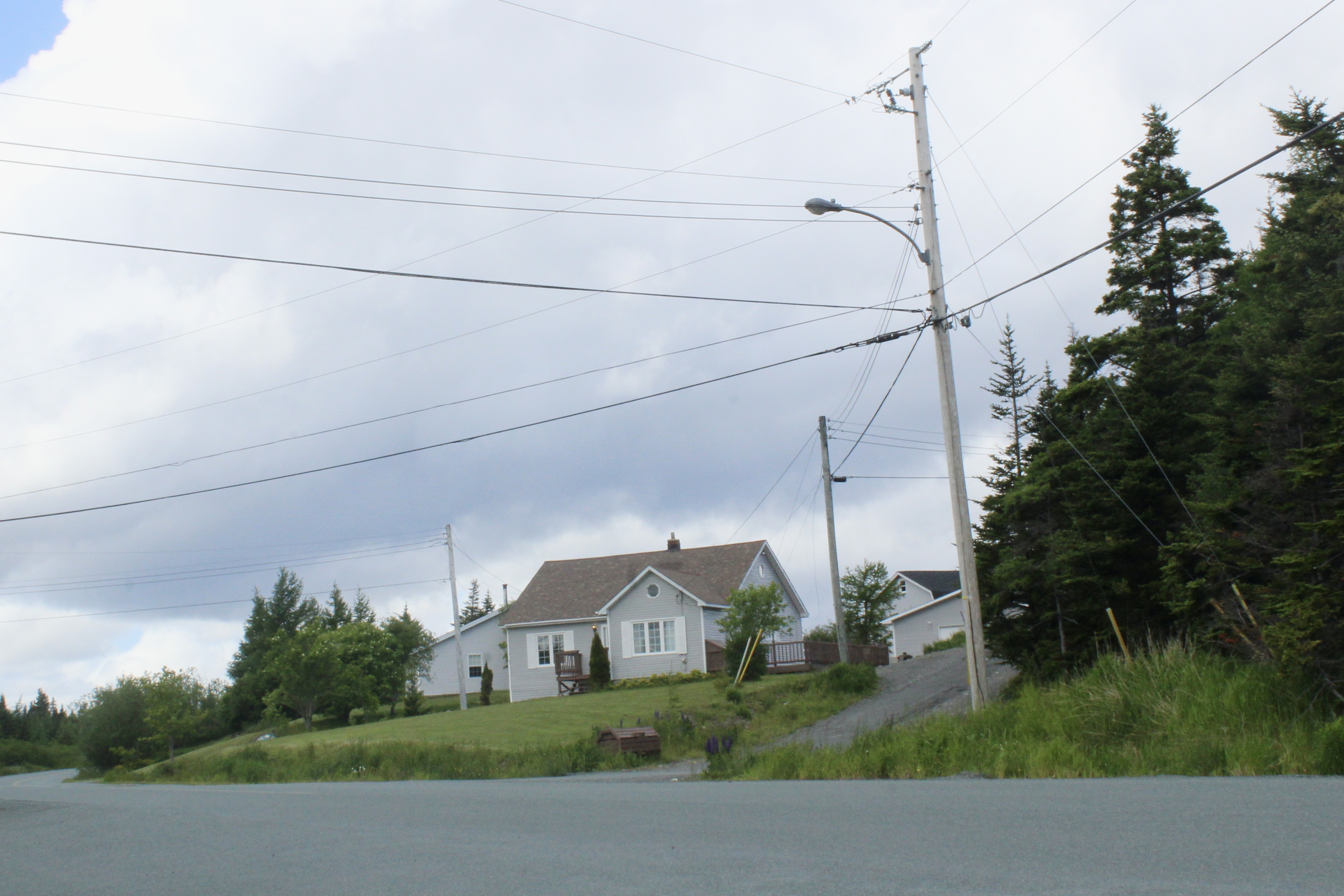

- Location of Colinet in Newfoundland
- Coordinates: 47°13′10″N 53°32′53″W
- Country: Canada
- Province: Newfoundland and Labrador

Area
  - Land: 6.24 km^{2} (2.41 sq mi)
- Elevation: 12 m (39 ft)

Population (2021)
  - Total: 103
  - Density: 12.8/km^{2} (33/sq mi)
- Time zone: UTC-3:30 (Newfoundland Time)
  - Summer (DST): UTC-2:30 (Newfoundland Daylight)
- Area code: 709
- Highways: Route 81; Route 91; Route 93

Colinet is an incorporated town located on the northwest arm of St. Mary's Bay in Newfoundland and Labrador, Canada.

== Geography ==
Colinet is notable for two rivers, the Rocky and the Colinet, which enter the sea in or near the town.

The Rocky River has a man-made salmon ladder spanning the 8 metres (26 ft) waterfalls at its mouth. Originally not a salmon river because of those falls, the river was seeded with salmon fry in the mid-1980s. The salmon began using the man-made ladder to bypass the falls in 1987. In 2002, the river opened to recreational anglers, making it Atlantic Canada's newest salmon river.

=== Climate ===
Climate data for Colinet
Month	Jan	Feb	Mar	Apr	May	Jun	Jul	Aug	Sep	Oct	Nov	Dec	Year
Record high °C (°F)	15 (59)	15.6 (60.1)	16.7 (62.1)	21 (70)	23 (73)	27.8 (82.0)	29.4 (84.9)	28.9 (84.0)	28 (82)	23.5 (74.3)	18 (64)	16.7 (62.1)	29.4 (84.9)
Mean daily maximum °C (°F)	0.2 (32.4)	−0.2 (31.6)	2.2 (36.0)	6.2 (43.2)	10.5 (50.9)	14.2 (57.6)	18.3 (64.9)	19.1 (66.4)	16.1 (61.0)	11.4 (52.5)	7.1 (44.8)	2.5 (36.5)	9 (48)
Mean daily minimum °C (°F)	−7.9 (17.8)	−8.7 (16.3)	−5.4 (22.3)	−1.2 (29.8)	1.9 (35.4)	5.9 (42.6)	10.3 (50.5)	11.3 (52.3)	7.6 (45.7)	3.6 (38.5)	0.1 (32.2)	−4.8 (23.4)	1.1 (34.0)
Record low °C (°F)	−25.6 (−14.1)	−28.9 (−20.0)	−26 (−15)	−13.9 (7.0)	−7.8 (18.0)	−4.4 (24.1)	−1.1 (30.0)	−1.1 (30.0)	−5 (23)	−10 (14)	−14.4 (6.1)	−24.4 (−11.9)	−28.9 (−20.0)
Average precipitation mm (inches)	130.4 (5.13)	113.2 (4.46)	105 (4.1)	92.5 (3.64)	96.9 (3.81)	118.7 (4.67)	102.4 (4.03)	128.4 (5.06)	119.4 (4.70)	136.3 (5.37)	126.4 (4.98)	121.5 (4.78)	1,391 (54.8)
Source: 1961-1990 Environment Canada

== Demographics ==
In the 2021 Census of Population conducted by Statistics Canada, Colinet had a population of 103 living in 54 of its 81 total private dwellings, a change of 28.8% from its 2016 population of 80. With a land area of 6.01 km^{2} (2.32 sq mi), it had a population density of 17.1/km^{2} (44.4/sq mi) in 2021.

Historical populations Colinet, NL
Year	Pop.	±%
2006	165	—
2011	110	−33.3%
2016	80	−27.3%
2021	103	+28.8%

== See also ==
- St. Mary's Bay (Newfoundland and Labrador)
- Placentia
