= Dunville, Newfoundland and Labrador =

Coordinates: 47.283°N 53.883°W

Location of Dunville, Placentia in Newfoundland and Labrador

Dunville is a neighbourhood located in the Town of Placentia, in Canada. it was earlier called Northeast or North East Placentia. The name was formed from "Dunphy's Village" a part of Northeast Placentia. It is a community that makes up the north-eastern section of the Town of Placentia. It stretches approximately 8 km along the northern shore of the North-East Arm of Placentia Bay.

The Post Office was established in 1895 and the first Post Master was Joachim Connors. Dunville was incorporated as a town on June 11, 1963. By 1966, it had a population of 1,606. Along with Freshwater, Argentia, and Jerseyside, it became part of Placentia in 1991.

It was flooded quite badly by Tropical Storm Chantel on August 1, 2007, when approximately 200 mm of rain fell within 6 hours. This washed away several roads and caused a large amount of other damage.

Dunville is served by one K-6 school St. Anne's Academy.

== See also ==
- Placentia, Newfoundland and Labrador
- Placentia Bay
- Argentia
- List of communities in Newfoundland and Labrador
