= Long Harbour Nickel Processing Plant =

- Location within Newfoundland and Labrador

General information
- Type: nickel processing plant
- Location: Long Harbour, Newfoundland and Labrador, Canada
- Coordinates: 47°25′27″N 53°49′0″W
- Construction started: April 2009
- Completed: Fall 2013 (Phase One Construction)
- Cost: 4.75 billion CAD
- Owner: Vale Limited

The Long Harbour Nickel Processing Plant is a Canadian nickel concentrate processing facility located in Long Harbour, Newfoundland and Labrador.

Operated by Vale Limited, construction on the plant started in April 2009 and operations began in 2014. Construction costs were in excess of CAD $4.25 billion. Construction involved over 3,200 workers generating approximately 3,000 person-years of employment. Operation of the plant will require approximately 475 workers.

Production began in July 2014, reported in November 2014. Vale's nickel processing plant in Long Harbour received its first major shipment from its Labrador mine in Voisey's Bay in May 2015. As of that date, a small proportion of the plant's raw materials came from Voisey's Bay but the majority were imported from Indonesia. A spokesman for Vale said 100 per cent of the Long Harbour facility's production materials will come from Voisey's Bay by early 2016.

Using the metal processing technology of hydrometallurgy, the plant is designed to produce 50,000 t (49,000 long tons; 55,000 short tons) per year of finished nickel product, together with associated cobalt and copper products. The hydrometallurgy technology was piloted at a demonstration plant that opened in Argentia, Newfoundland and Labrador in 2004. This demonstration plant operated until 2008 and was instrumental in helping Vale decide to use the hydrometallurgy process for the Long Harbour processing plant.

A processing plant on Newfoundland was one of the requirements established by the Government of Newfoundland and Labrador in order to exploit the nickel deposit at the Voisey's Bay Mine in Labrador. The bulk carrier MV Umiak I was one of several ice-strengthened bulk carriers built to transport nickel concentrate from Voisey's Bay to the Long Harbour Nickel Processing Plant.

The Long Harbour Nickel Processing Plant was built on a partially brownfield site near the port of Long Harbour. The facility consists of a wharf for offloading nickel ore concentrate from bulk carriers, crushing and grinding facilities, a main processing plant approximately 2 km (1.2 mi) south of the port, a pipeline to supply process water, an effluent discharge pipe and diffuser, and a residue pipeline to a nearby disposal area. The hydrometallurgical process in the plant will pressure-leach the nickel ore concentrate in acidic solutions to separate iron, sulfur and other impurities from nickel, copper and cobalt.

On June 11, 2018, Premier Dwight Ball announced Vale is moving forward with its underground mine at Voisey's Bay. Ball stated that the move will extend the mine's operating life by at least 15 years. First ore is expected by April 2021 with processing to take place in Long Harbour.
