= St. Bride's, Newfoundland and Labrador =

St. Bride's
- Town
- Location of St. Bride's in Newfoundland
- Coordinates: 46°55′19″N 54°10′20″W
- Country: Canada
- Province: Newfoundland and Labrador

Government
  - Mayor: Glenn Lake
  - MHA: Sherry Gambin-Walsh
  - MP: Jonathan Rowe

Population (2021)
  - Total: 272
- Time zone: UTC-3:30 (Newfoundland Time)
  - Summer (DST): UTC-2:30 (Newfoundland Daylight)
- Area code: 709
- Highways: Route 100

St. Bride's (Irish: Cill Bhríde) is a town on the Cape Shore of Newfoundland, Canada. Located 166 km Southwest of the capital of Newfoundland and Labrador, St. John's, St. Bride's is a fishing community with a population of approximately 272 people as of 2021. The largest codfish ever caught, weighing in at 125 lbs, was landed here in 1905.

St. Bride's is the largest community on the Cape Shore, and serves as an administrative centre. It is home to Fatima Academy and several businesses and government services.

The community is named for the Irish St. Brigid, which reflects the community's traditional history of ties to the southeast of Ireland, the Irish language in Newfoundland, and to the Catholic Church.

It was the location of St. Bride's Radar Station.

== Demographics ==
In the 2021 Census of Population conducted by Statistics Canada, St. Bride's had a population of 272 living in 166 of its 204 total private dwellings, a change of 7.9% from its 2016 population of 252. With a land area of 5.38 km^{2} (2.08 sq mi), it had a population density of 59.1/km^{2} (153.1/sq mi) in 2021.
