= North Harbour, St. Mary's Bay, Newfoundland and Labrador =

North Harbour
- designated place
- Location of North Harbour North Harbour (Canada)
- Coordinates: 47.166°N 53.661°W
- Country: Canada
- Province: Newfoundland and Labrador
- Region: Newfoundland
- Census division: 1
- Census subdivision: X

Area
  - Land: 8.44 km^{2} (3.26 sq mi)

Population (2016)
  - Total: 69
- Time zone: UTC−03:30 (NST)
  - Summer (DST): UTC−02:30 (NDT)
- Area code: 709

North Harbour is a designated place in the Canadian province of Newfoundland and Labrador on St. Mary's Bay of the island of Newfoundland.

== Geography ==
North Harbour is in Newfoundland within Subdivision X of Division No. 1.

== Demographics ==
As a designated place in the 2016 Census of Population conducted by Statistics Canada, North Harbour recorded a population of 69 living in 32 of its 61 total private dwellings, a change of −25% from its 2011 population of 92. With a land area of 8.44 km^{2} (3.26 sq mi), it had a population density of 8.2/km^{2} (21.2/sq mi) in 2016.

== See also ==
- List of communities in Newfoundland and Labrador
- List of designated places in Newfoundland and Labrador
