= List of Newfoundland and Labrador highways =

This is a list of highways in Newfoundland and Labrador. Newfoundland and Labrador is unusual among jurisdictions in Canada in that it exclusively uses highway marker signs that do not use either the province's name, symbols, or other official insignia.

== Main provincial highways ==
List of Newfoundland and Labrador highways that traverse both the island and mainland part of the province and those that lead into distinct regions of the province.

Number	Length (km)	Length (mi)	Southern or western terminus	Northern or eastern terminus	Formed	Removed	Notes
Route 1 (TCH)	903	561	Marine Atlantic Nova Scotia ferry / Route 470 in Channel-Port aux Basques	Route 30 / E White Hills Road in St. John's	—	—	Trans Canada Highway
Route 100	108	67	Route 92 at Branch	Route 1 (TCH) at Whitbourne	—	—	Argentia Access Road and Cape Shore Highway
Route 210	198	123	Route 220 at Grand Bank	Route 1 (TCH) in Goobies	—	—	also known as the Burin Peninsula Highway and Heritage Run
Route 230	110	68	Route 1 (TCH) at Thorburn Lake	Route 235 in Bonavista	—	—	
Route 320	80.9	50.3	Route 1 (TCH) at Gambo	Route 330 at New-Wes-Valley	—	—	
Route 330	142	88	Route 1 (TCH) at Gander	Route 320 at New-Wes-Valley	—	—	
Route 340	106.3	66.1	Route 1 (TCH) at Notre Dame Junction	Long Point Lighthouse near Crow Head	—	—	also known as Road to the Isles
Route 350	70.7	43.9	Route 1 (TCH) at Bishops Falls	Oceanside Nature Park at Leading Tickles	—	—	
Route 360	204	127	Dead End in Harbour Breton	Route 1 (TCH) at Bishops Falls	—	—	
Route 410	89.9	55.9	Route 1 (TCH) at Sheppardville	Dead End in Fleur-de-Lys	—	—	also known as Dorset Trail
Route 430	413	257	Route 1 (TCH) at Deer Lake	West Street / Goose Cove Road in St. Anthony	—	—	
Route 480	150	93	Ramea Ferry in Burgeo	Route 1 (TCH) at Southwest Brook	—	—	
Route 500	543	337	R-389 at Labrador City	Route 520 at Happy Valley-Goose Bay	—	—	Trans-Labrador Highway
Route 510	606	377	R-138 at L'Anse-au-Clair	Route 500 at Cartwright	—	—	Trans-Labrador Highway

== Regional roads ==
Main transportation routes leading into and around the various regions of the province sorted by regions.

=== Avalon Peninsula and Isthmus Region ===
- Route 2, Pitts Memorial Drive and Peacekeeper's Way
- Route 3, Robert E. Howlett Memorial Drive
- Route 3A, Team Gushue Highway
- Route 10, Southern Shore Highway (eastern side of Irish Loop Drive)
- Route 11, Petty Harbour Road
- Route 13, Witless Bay Line
- Route 20, Torbay Road and Pouch Cove Road
- Route 21, Bauline Line
- Route 30, Logy Bay Road
- Route 40, Portugal Cove Road
- Route 41, Beachy Cove Road
- Route 50, Thorburn Road
- Route 60, Topsail Road and Conception Bay Highway
- Route 61, Foxtrap Access Road
- Route 62, Holyrood Access Road
- Route 63, Avondale Access Road
- Route 70, Roaches Line and Conception Bay North Highway
- Route 71, Hodgewater Line
- Route 72, Port de Grave Road
- Route 73, New Harbour Road
- Route 74, Heart's Content Highway
- Route 75, Veterans Memorial Highway
- Route 80, Trinity Road
- Route 81, Markland Road
- Route 90, Salmonier Line and St. Mary's Bay Highway (western portion of the Irish Loop Drive)
- Route 91, Old Placentia Highway
- Route 92, North Harbour-Branch Highway
- Route 93, Mount Carmel Road
- Route 94, Admirals Beach Road
- Route 100, Argentia Access Road and Cape Shore Highway
- Route 101, Long Harbour Access Road
- Route 102, Fox Harbour Road and Ship Harbour Road
- Route 201, Chapel Arm-Bellevue Road (Osprey Trail)
- Route 202, Long Harbour Road
- Route 203, Fair Haven Road

=== Burin Peninsula ===
- Route 210, Heritage Run (Burin Peninsula Highway)
- Route 211, English Harbour East Road
- Route 212, Bay L'Argent Road
- Route 213, Garnish Road
- Route 214, Monkstown Road
- Route 215, Petit Forte Road
- Route 220, Burin Peninsula Highway
- Route 220A, Creston Boulevard
- Route 221, Burin Road
- Route 222, Salt Pond-Winterland Road

=== Bonavista Peninsula and area ===
- Route 204, Southwest Arm Road
- Route 205, Hatchet Cove Road
- Route 230, Discovery Trail (Bonavista Peninsula Highway)
- Route 230A, Old Bonavista Peninsula Highway
- Route 231, Random Island Road
- Route 232, Smith Sound Road
- Route 233, Clode Sound Road
- Route 234, Winter Brook Road
- Route 235, Bonavista Bay Highway
- Route 236, Stock Cove Road
- Route 237, Blackhead Bay Road
- Route 238, Elliston Road
- Route 239, New Bonaventure Road

=== Kittiwake Coast, Fogo Island and Twillingate areas ===
- Route 301, Terra Nova Road
- Route 310, Road to the Beaches
- Route 320, Road to the Shore, east side
- Route 330, Road to the Shore, west side
- Route 331, Boyd's Cove Highway
- Route 332, Frederickton Road
- Route 333, Fogo Island Road
- Route 334, Joe Batt's Arm Road
- Route 335, Farewell Road
- Route 340, Road to the Isles
- Route 341, Laurenceton Road
- Route 342, Embree Road
- Route 343, Road to Comfort Cove
- Route 344, Cottlesville Road
- Route 345, Moreton's Harbour Road
- Route 346, Toogood Arm Road

=== Exploits River Valley and Bay d'Espoir region ===
- Route 350, Botwood Highway
- Route 351, Rattling Brook Road
- Route 352, Fortune Harbour Road
- Route 360, Bay d'Espoir Highway
- Route 361, St. Albans Road
- Route 362, Belleoram Road
- Route 363, Coomb's Cove Road
- Route 364, Hermitage River Road
- Route 365, Conne River Road
- Route 370, Buchans Highway
- Route 371, Millertown Junction Road (believed to be abandoned)

=== Baie Verte Region ===
- Route 380, Beothuk Trail
- Route 381, Port Anson Road
- Route 382, Long Island Tickle Road
- Route 390, Springdale Road
- Route 391, Harry's Harbour Road
- Route 392, Beachside Road
- Route 410, Dorset Trail
- Route 411, Purbeck's Cove Road
- Route 412, Seal Cove Road
- Route 413, Burlington Road
- Route 414, La Scie Highway
- Route 415, Nippers Harbour Road
- Route 416, Round Harbour Road
- Route 417, Pacquet Road
- Route 418, Ming's Bight Road
- Route 419, Wild Cove Road

=== Great Northern Peninsula and area ===
- Route 401, Howley Road
- Route 420, White Bay South Highway
- Route 421, Hampden Road
- Route 422, Cormack Road
- Route 430, The Viking Trail (Great Northern Peninsula Highway)
- Route 431, Bonne Bay Road
- Route 432, Main Brook Highway
- Route 433, Englee Highway
- Route 434, Conche Road
- Route 435, Cook's Harbour Road
- Route 436, L'Anse aux Meadows Road
- Route 437, Cape Onion Road
- Route 438, Croque Road

=== Western Newfoundland ===
- Route 402, Gallants Road
- Route 403, Flat Bay Road
- Route 404, Robinsons Road
- Route 405, Highlands Road
- Route 406, Codroy Road
- Route 407, St. Andrews-Searston Road
- Route 408, Cape Ray Road
- Route 440, Admiral Palliser's Trail (formerly North Shore Highway)
- Route 450, Captain Cook's Trail (formerly South Shore Highway)
- Route 450A, Lewin Parkway
- Route 460, White's Road / Hansen Memorial Highway / Kippens Road / Port au Port Highway

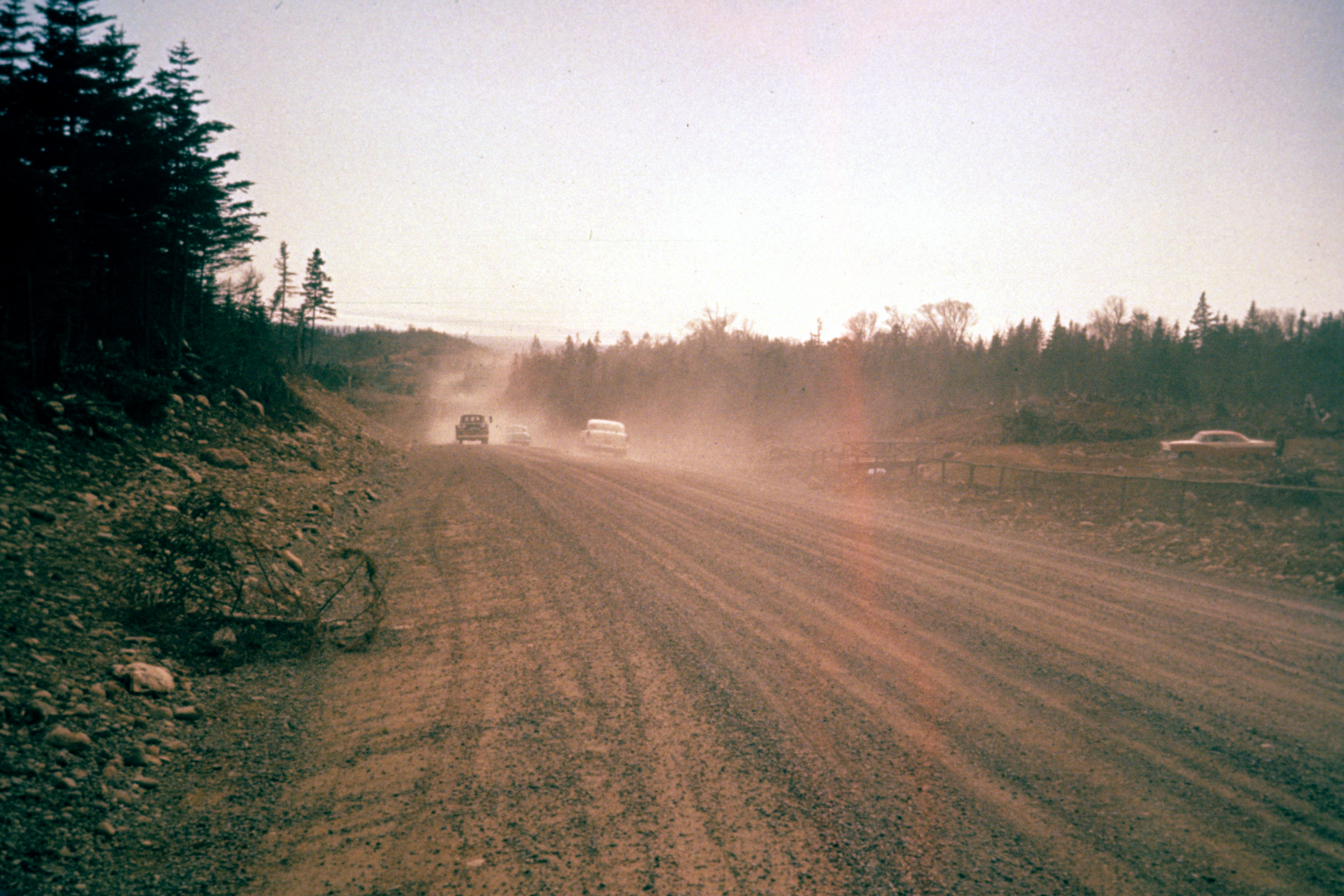
Hansen Memorial Highway 1963

- Route 461, St. George's Highway
- Route 462, Point au Mal Road
- Route 463, Lourdes Road
- Route 470, La Poile Highway
- Route 480, Burgeo Highway
- Route 490, Stephenville Access Road

=== Labrador ===
- Route 500, Trans-Labrador Highway
- Route 503, Grenfell Drive
- Route 510, Labrador South Highway
- Route 513, St. Lewis Highway
- Route 514, Charlottetown Highway
- Route 516, Cartwright Highway
- Route 520, Northwest River Road

== Local roads ==
There is also an extensive system of numbered local roads in Newfoundland and Labrador. These roads are numbered based on an intersecting primary highway, with another two-digit number following a dash (i.e. 210–01).

=== Avalon Peninsula and Isthmus Region ===
- Route 10-30, Tors Cove Road
- Route 10-32, Burnt Cove Road
- Route 10-33, La Manche Road
- Route 10-34, Brigus South
- Route 10-35, Admirals Cove Road
- Route 10-37, Calvert Road
- Route 10-42, Port Kirwan Road
- Route 10-45, Kingmans Road
- Route 10-46, Wharf Road in Renews
- Route 10-50, Portugal Cove South Road
- Route 10-52, St. Shott's Road
- Route 20-16, Indian Meal Line (linking Torbay and Portugal Cove)
- Route 20-17, Wind Gap Road (to Flatrock)
- Route 20-19, Pouch Cove Line
- Route 20-21, Pine Line in Torbay
- Route 30-16, Middle Cove Road
- Route 31-11, Road to Memorial University of Newfoundland Marine Sciences Laboratory
- Route 40-12, Old Broad Cove Road in Portugal Cove-St. Philips
- Route 40-15, Bauline Line in Portugal Cove-St. Philips
- Route 41-10, Witch Hazel Road in Portugal Cove-St. Philips
- Route 50-17, Tolt Road in Portugal Cove-St. Philips
- Route 50-25, Bennetts Road in Portugal Cove-St. Philips
- Route 60-23, Holyrood Thermal Generating Station Road
- Route 60-17, Terminal Road in Foxtrap
- Route 60-24, Chapels Cove Road
- Route 60-30, Cemetery Road in Conception Harbour
- Route 60-31, Colliers Harbour Road
- Route 60-33, New Line Road
- Route 60-34, Marysvale Road
- Route 60-35, Old Mill Road
- Route 60-36, Georgetown Road
- Route 60-37, Church Road in Georgetown
- Route 60-39, Path End Road
- Route 60-40, Curnews Road
- Route 70-10, Mahers Road
- Route 70-11, Goulds Ridge Road
- Route 70-13, Bareneed Road
- Route 70-17, Cranes Road (to Upper Island Cove)
- Route 70-18, Thickett Road (to Upper Island Cove)
- Route 70-20, Bryants Cove Road
- Route 70-24, Glover Road (near Harbour Grace)
- Route 70-30, Freshwater Road (not to be confused with street in St. John's)
- Route 70-32, Flatrock Road (in Carbonear)
- Route 70-33, Old North Shore Highway (Victoria to Salmon Cove)
- Route 70-37, Perry's Cove Road
- Route 70-42, Bradleys Cove Road
- Route 70-43, Western Bay Line
- Route 70-51, Lower Island Cove Road
- Route 70-53, Caplin Cove Road
- Route 70-54, Low Point Road
- Route 70-56, Red Head Cove Road
- Route 70-57, New Road in Red Head Cove
- Route 70-58, Back Road in Grates Cove
- Route 70-61, Grates Cove Road
- Route 70-62, North River Road
- Route 70-63, Country Road in Bay Roberts
- Route 70-64, Shearstown Road
- Route 80-10, Spread Eagle Road (near Old Shop)
- Route 80-10-1, Old Shop Road
- Route 80-15, Dildo Harbour Road
- Route 80-16, Dildo Road
- Route 80-18, Andersons Cove Road
- Route 80-19, Harbour Drive in New Harbour
- Route 80-20, West Side Road in Hopeall
- Route 80-20-1, Old Hopeall Road
- Route 80-21, Hopeall Road
- Route 80-22, West Side Road in Greens Harbour
- Route 80-23, Crocker's Cove Road
- Route 80-24, Old Main Road in Whiteway
- Route 80-31, Hants Harbour Road
- Route 100-17, Point Lance Road
- Route 100-20, Ferndale Road
- Route 201-14, Access Road to Bellevue
- Route 202-10, Long Harbour Local Road
- Route 2-1-01, Little Harbour East Road
- Route 2-1-02, Southern Harbour Road
- Route 2-1-03, Arnold's Cove Road
- Route 2-1-04, Arnold's Cove Station Road
- Route 2-1-05, Come By Chance Refinery Road
- Route 2-1-06, Come By Chance Road
- Route 2-1-07, Sunnyside Road

=== Burin Peninsula ===
- Route 210-10, Goobies Road
- Route 210-11, North Harbour Road
- Route 210-13, Garden Cove Road
- Route 210-15, Boat Harbour West Road
- Route 210-16, Spur Road in Boat Harbour
- Route 210-17, Spur Road in Brookside
- Route 210-23, Jean de Baie Road
- Route 210-24, Spanish Room Road
- Route 210-26, Spur Road in Spanish Room
- Route 210-33, Spur Roads in Swift Current
- Route 211-12, Spur Road in Grand Le Pierre
- Route 214-10, Davis Cove Road
- Route 220-10, Little Bay Road
- Route 221-15, Mortier Road
- Route 222-10, Winterland Road

=== Bonavista Peninsula and area ===
- Route 2-1-08, Ivany's Cove Road (formerly Route 204–10)
- Route 2-1-09, Deep Bight Road and Spur Roads
- Route 2-1-10, Charlottetown Road
- Route 204-17, Butter Cove Road
- Route 204-19, Gooseberry Cove Road
- Route 230-14, Sweet Bay Road and Spur Roads
- Route 230-15, Trinity East Road and Spur Roads
- Route 230-17, Champneys West Road and Spur Roads
- Route 230-19, Champney's Arm Road
- Route 230-21, English Harbour Road and Spur Roads
- Route 230-26, Little Catalina Road
- Route 231-10, Snook's Harbour Road
- Route 231-16, Hickman's Harbour Road and Spur Roads
- Route 231-19, Lower Lance Cove Road and Spur Roads
- Route 233-10, Canning's Cove Road and Spur Roads
- Route 233-13, Port Blandford Road and Spur Roads
- Route 234-10, Lethbridge Road and Spur Roads
- Route 235–13, Summerville Road
- Route 235–17, Tickle Cove Road
- Route 235–20, Keels Road
- Route 238-11, Maberly Road
- Route 239-15, Old Bonaventure Road

=== Kittiwake Coast, Fogo Island and Twillingate areas ===
- Route 3-1-06, Benton Road
- Route 310-11, Traytown Access Road
- Route 310-13, Culls Harbour Road
- Route 310-25, Happy Adventure Road
- Route 310-26, Powells Cove Road
- Route 310-27, Sandy Cove Road (Bonavista Bay)
- Route 310-32, Burnside Road
- Route 320-26, Dover Road
- Route 320-33, Greenspond Road (renamed Derrick Bragg Way in February 2024)
- Route 320-34, Pool's Island Road
- Route 320-36, New-Wes-Valley Road (formerly Wesleyville Road)
- Route 330-13, Carmanville South Road
- Route 330-14, Ladle Cove Road
- Route 330-16, Aspen Cove Road
- Route 330-28, Cape Freels North Road
- Route 330-24, Newtown Road
- Route 330-45, Deadman's Bay Road
- Route 331-10, Horwood Road
- Route 331-11, Rodgers Cove Road
- Route 333-11, Stag Harbour North Road
- Route 333-16, Stag Harbour South Road
- Route 333-18, Deep Bay Road
- Route 333-21, Island Harbour Road
- Route 335-10, Port Albert Road
- Route 335-14, Change Island Road
- Route 340-17, Baytona Road
- Route 340-23, Boyd's Cove South Road
- Route 340-27, Boyd's Cove North Road
- Route 340-29, Fairbanks Road
- Route 340-36, Newville Road
- Route 340-37, Herring Neck Road
- Route 340-46, Bayview Cove Road
- Route 340-49, Little Harbour Road
- Route 340-69, Old Newville Road
- Route 340-73, Indian Cove Road
- Route 341-10, Stanhope Road
- Route 341-12, Porterville Road
- Route 345-11, Virgin Arm Point Road
- Route 345-17, Bridgeport Road
- Route 345-20, Valleypond Road
- Route 346-10 and Route 346-11, Pikes Arm Roads
- Route 346-13, Rogers Cove-Cobbs Arm Road

=== Exploits River Valley and Bay d'Espoir Region ===
- Route 3-1-09, Norris Arm North Road
- Route 3-1-12, Wooddale Road
- Route 3-1-13, Grenfell Heights Road in Grand Falls-Windsor
- Route 3-1-18, Old Badger Road near Price Farm
- Route 3-1-20, Old Badger Road in Badger
- Route 350-13, Peterview Road
- Route 350-17, Pleasantview Road
- Route 350-21, Glovers Harbour Road
- Route 351-10, Old Trans-Canada Highway (to the former Sir Robert Bond Bridge)
- Route 361-10, Milltown Road
- Route 361-11, Conne River Barasway Road
- Route 361-18, St. Albans Airfield Road
- Route 362-10, Pool's Cove Road
- Route 363-10, English Harbour West Road
- Route 363-13, Boxey Road
- Route 363-15, Wreck Cove Road
- Route 370-11, Millertown Road
- Route 370-12, Millertown Front Road
- Route 380-16, Brighton Road
- Route 391-10, King's Point Road
- Route 391-11, Jacksons Cove Road
- Route 391-14, Langdown Cove Road

=== Baie Verte and White Bay region ===
- Route 410-10, Coachman's Cove Road
- Route 411-11, Bear Cove Road
- Route 413-10, Smith's Harbour Road
- Route 413-12, Local Road in Smith's Harbour
- Route 414-10, Brent's Cove Road
- Route 414-11, Harbour Round Road
- Route 414-12, Tilt Cove Road
- Route 414-13, Shoe Cove Road
- Route 414-14, Cape St. John Road
- Route 416-10, Snooks Arm Road
- Route 416-11, Town of Harbour Round
- Route 417-10, Woodstock East Road
- Route 418-10, Local Roads in Mings Bight
- Route 420-10, Pollard's Point Road
- Route 421-11, Bayside Road in Hampden
- Route 421-12, Loop Road in Hampden

=== Great Northern Peninsula and area ===
- Route 430-15, Norris Point Road
- Route 430-21, Cow Head Road
- Route 430-24, Portland Creek Road
- Route 430-28, Port au Choix Road
- Route 430-32, Bartletts Harbour Road
- Route 430-33, Castors River South Road
- Route 430-34, Castors River North Road
- Route 430-36, Reefs Harbour Road
- Route 430-37, Brig Bay Road
- Route 430-46, Bird Cove Road
- Route 430-47, Plum Point Road
- Route 430-48, Blue Cove Road
- Route 430-49, Pond Cove Road
- Route 430-50, St. Barbe Road
- Route 430-52, Forresters Point Road
- Route 430-56, Anchor Point Road
- Route 430-68, Shoal Cove East Road
- Route 430-69, Green Island Cove Road
- Route 430-70, Green Island Brook Road
- Route 430-71, Wharf Road in Green Island Brook
- Route 430-75, St. Anthony Bight Road
- Route 430-76, Great Brehat Road
- Route 430-80, St. Carols Road
- Route 431-10, Lomond Road
- Route 431-11, Woody Point Road
- Route 433-10, Bide Arm Road
- Route 435-10, Wharf Road in Cook's Harbour
- Route 436-11, Quirpon Road
- Route 436-12, Wharf Road in St. Lunaire
- Route 436-13, Wharf Road in Griquet
- Route 436-15, Noddy Bay Road
- Route 436-17, Straitsview Road
- Route 437-10, Spur Road in Raleigh

=== Western ===
- Route 4-1-06, Steel Mountain Road
- Route 4-1-07, South Branch Road
- Route 4-1-08, Local Roads in South Branch
- Route 403-11, Station Road in St. Theresa
- Route 404-11, Cartyville Road
- Route 404-12, Local Roads in Jeffreys
- Route 404-13, Local Roads in Robinsons
- Route 404-14, Station Road in Robinsons
- Route 404-15, Local Roads in Fischells
- Route 404-16, Station Road in Heatherton
- Route 405-10, King's Road in St. Fintans
- Route 405-11, St. David's Road
- Route 405-12, Maidstone Road
- Route 405-13, Loch Leven Road
- Route 405-14, Joe McGinn's Road in Highlands
- Route 405-16, Local Roads in St. David's
- Route 406-10, Local Road in Codroy
- Route 406-11, Doyles Road
- Route 406-12, Benoit's Siding Road
- Route 406-13, O'Regans Road
- Route 407-10, Radio Range Road in St. Andrews
- Route 407-11, St. Andrews Post Office Road
- Route 407-12, Loch Lomond-Upper Ferry Road
- Route 407-13, Block Road near Searston
- Route 460-10, White's Road (to Stephenville Crossing)
- Route 460-11, Cold Brook Road
- Route 460-13, Boswarlos Road
- Route 460-14, Felix Cove-Aguathuna Road
- Route 460-15, Roads in Aguathuna
- Route 460-16, Romaines Road in Port au Port
- Route 461-11, Mattis Point Road
- Route 461-12, Shallop Cove Road
- Route 463-11, Long Point Road
- Route 470-10, Margaree Road
- Route 470-11, Fox Roost Road
- Route 470-14, Diamond Cove Road
- Route 470-16, Harbour Le Cou Road

=== Labrador ===
- Route 500-10, Duley Lake Road
- Route 503-11, Airport Road in Labrador City
- Route 510-11, L'Anse Amour Road
- Route 511-10, Pinsent's Arm Road
