= Demographics of Newfoundland and Labrador =

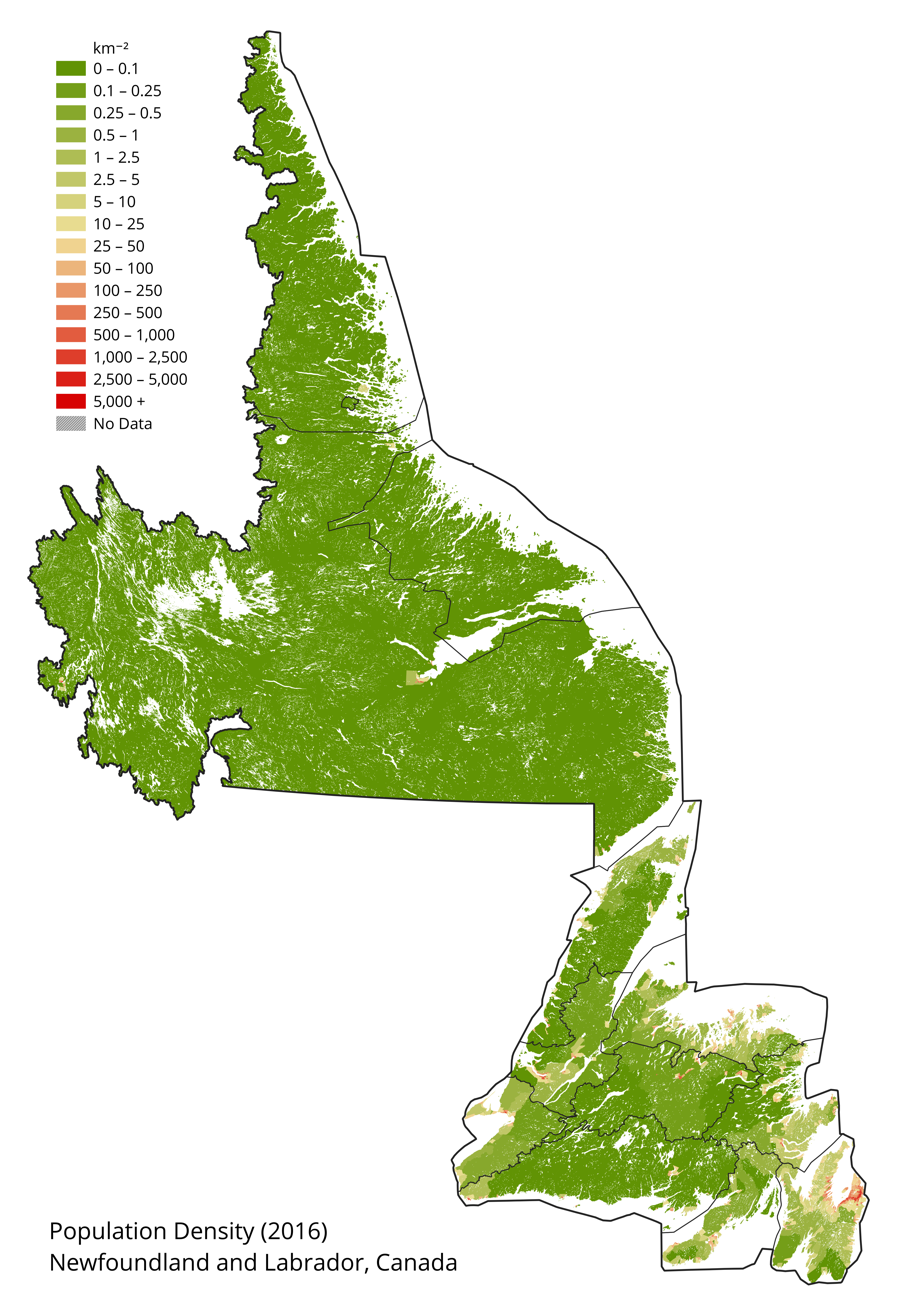
Canada Newfoundland and Labrador Density 2016

Newfoundland and Labrador is a province of Canada on the country's Atlantic coast in northeastern North America. The province has an area of 405,212 square kilometres (100,130,000 acres) and a population in 2024 of 545,880, with approximately 95% of the provincial population residing on the Island of Newfoundland (including its associated smaller islands), with more than half of the population residing on the Avalon Peninsula. People from Newfoundland and Labrador are called "Newfoundlanders," "Labradorians" (as appropriate), or "Newfoundlanders and Labradorians".

== Population history ==
Since entering confederation, Newfoundland and Labrador has always been ranked 9th among provinces in population.

Historical populations
Year	Pop.	±%
1825	55,719	—
1836	73,705	+32.3%
1845	96,295	+30.6%
1851	101,600	+5.5%
1857	124,288	+22.3%
1869	146,536	+17.9%
1874	161,374	+10.1%
1884	197,335	+22.3%
1891	202,040	+2.4%
1901	220,984	+9.4%
1911	242,619	+9.8%
1921	263,033	+8.4%
1935	289,588	+10.1%
1951	361,416	+24.8%
1956	415,074	+14.8%
1961	457,853	+10.3%
1966	493,396	+7.8%
1971	522,100	+5.8%
1976	557,720	+6.8%
1981	567,681	+1.8%
1986	568,350	+0.1%
1991	568,475	+0.0%
1996	551,790	−2.9%
2001	512,930	−7.0%
2006	505,469	−1.5%
2011	514,536	+1.8%
2016	519,716	+1.0%
2021	510,550	−1.8%
Source: and Statistics Canada

View chart definition.

Source: Statistics Canada

== Population geography ==
=== Cities and towns ===
Census Metropolitan Areas and Census Agglomerations in the province by population

Urban Area	2016
St. John's (CMA)	205,955
Corner Brook (CA)	31,917
Grand Falls-Windsor (CA)	14,171
Gander (CA)	13,234
Bay Roberts (CA)	11,083

=== Municipalities by population ===
Municipalities in the province by population are
Rank	Municipality	2016
1	St. John's	110,525
2	Conception Bay South	27,168
3	Paradise	22,957
4	Mount Pearl	22,477
5	Corner Brook	19,333
6	Grand Falls-Windsor	13,853
7	Gander	11,880
8	Portugal Cove-St. Philip's	8,415
9	Happy Valley-Goose Bay	8,040
10	Torbay	7,852
11	Labrador City	7,220
12	Stephenville	6,540
13	Clarenville	6,704
14	Bay Roberts	5,974
15	Marystown	5,974
16	Deer Lake	4,864
17	Carbonear	4,696
18	Channel-Port aux Basques	3,547
19	Pasadena	3,524
20	Placentia	3,289
21	Bonavista	3,190
22	Lewisporte	3,288
23	Bishop's Falls	3,156
24	Harbour Grace	2,995
25	Springdale	2,971
26	Botwood	2,875
27	Spaniard's Bay	2,653
28	Holyrood	2,463
29	Burin	2,315
30	Grand Bank	2,310
31	St. Anthony	2,258
32	Fogo Island	2,244
33	Logy Bay-Middle Cove-Outer Cove	2,221
34	Twillingate	2,196
35	New-Wes-Valley	2,172
36	Wabana	2,146
37	Glovertown	2,083
38	Pouch Cove	2,069
39	Kippens	2,008
40	Gambo	1,978
41	Wabush	1,906
42	Trinity Bay North	1,819
43	Victoria	1,800
44	Stephenville Crossing	1,719
45	Flatrock	1,683
46	Harbour Breton	1,634
47	Massey Drive	1,632
48	Witless Bay	1,619
49	Humber Arm South	1,599
50	Upper Island Cove	1,561
51	Clarke's Beach	1,558
52	Bay Bulls	1,500
53	Irishtown-Summerside	1,418
54	Fortune	1,401
55	Baie Verte	1,313
56	Burgeo	1,307
57	St. George's	1,203
58	St. Lawrence	1,192
59	St. Alban's	1,186
60	Centreville-Wareham-Trinity	1,147
61	Nain	1,125
62	Harbour Main-Chapel's Cove-Lakeview	1,067
63	Sheshatshiu	1,023
64	Roddickton-Bide Arm	999
65	Musgrave Harbour	990
66	Triton	983
67	Hare Bay	969
68	Petty Harbour-Maddox Cove	960
69	Samiajij Miawpukek	956
70	Arnold's Cove	949
71	Rocky Harbour	947
72	Natuashish	936
73	Summerford	906
74	Whitbourne	890
75	LaScie	872
76	Cape St. George	853
77	Peterview	828
78	Robert's Arm	805
79	Port aux Choix	789
80	Glenwood	778
81	Milltown-Head of Bay D'Espoir	749
82	Mount Moriah	746
83	Cupids	743
84	Carmanville	740
85	Norris Arm	737
86	Brigus	723
87	Badger	704
88	Embree	701
89	Cox's Cove	688
90	Conception Harbour	685
91	Salmon Cove	680
92	Heart's Delight-Islington	674
93	Port Saunders	674
94	Norris Point	670
95	Norman's Cove-Long Cove	666
96	Isle aux Morts	664
97	Dover	662
98	King's Point	659
99	Colliers	654
100	South River	647
101	Buchans	642
102	Avondale	641
103	Old Perlican	633
104	Meadows	626
105	Lawn	624
106	Burnt Islands	622
107	St. Lunaire-Griquet	604
108	Port Blandford	601
109	Cormack	597
110	Point Leamington	591
111	St. Jacques-Coomb's Cove	588
112	Port au Port East	579
113	Appleton	574
114	Hopedale	574
115	North River	570
116	Garnish	568
117	Musgravetown	564
118	L'Anse au Loup	558
119	Trout River	552
120	Birchy Bay	550
121	North West River	547
122	Lewin's Cove	544
123	McIvers	538
124	Englee	527
125	Lark Harbour	522
126	Reidville	509
127	Eastport	501
128	Lumsden	501
129	Cape Broyle	489
130	South Brook	482
131	Terrenceville	482
132	Trepassey	481
133	Middle Arm	474
134	Lourdes	465
135	Chapel Arm	457
136	Bauline	452
137	Campbellton	452
138	Winterton	450
139	Port au Port West-Aguathuna-Felix Cove	449
140	Ramea	447
141	Steady Brook	444
142	St. Bernard's-Jacques Fontaine	433
143	Hampden	429
144	Cow Head	428
145	Cartwright	427
146	Northern Arm	426
147	Hermitage-Sandyville	422
148	Ferryland	414
149	Port Hope Simpson	412
150	Gillams	410
151	Forteau	409
152	Comfort Cove-Newstead	407
153	Sunnyside	396
154	Bryant's Cove	395
155	Rose Blanche-Harbour le Cou	394
156	Bay de Verde	392
157	Winterland	390
158	Small Point-Adam's Cove-Blackhead-Broad Cove	387
159	Makkovik	377
160	Belleoram	374
161	Whiteway	373
162	Southern Harbour	369
163	Mount Carmel-Mitchells Brook-St. Catharine's	349
164	St. Mary's	347
165	Parson's Pond	345
166	York Harbour	344
167	Mary's Harbour	341
168	Heart's Content	340
169	Port Rexton	340
170	Hant's Harbour	329
171	Fermeuse	325
172	Ming's Bight	319
173	Hawke's Bay	315
174	Anchor Point	314
175	Burlington	314
176	St. Vincent's-St. Stephen's-Peter's River	313
177	Elliston	308
178	Rigolet	305
179	Seal Cove (White Bay)	303
180	Renews-Cappahayden	301
181	Fox Cove-Mortier	295
182	Pilley's Cove	294
183	Leading Tickles	292
184	Charlottetown	290
185	Bishop's Cove	287
186	Jackson's Arm	284
187	Woody Point	282
188	Little Burnt Bay	281
189	Cottlesville	271
190	Flower's Cove	270
191	Lamaline	267
192	Traytown	267
193	Greenspond	266
194	Baytona	262
195	Chance Cove	256
196	Hughes Brook	255
197	Daniel's Harbour	253
198	Fox Harbour	252
199	St. Bride's	252
200	Parkers Cove	248
201	Rushoon	245
202	Fleur de Lys	244
203	Main Brook	243
204	Seal Cove (Fortune Bay)	242
205	Bay L'Argent	241
206	St. Pauls	238
207	Grand le Pierre	235
208	Gaskiers-Point La Haye	232
209	Point May	231
210	Sandringham	229
211	Branch	228
212	Come By Chance	228
213	Glenburnie-Birchy Head-Shoal Brook	224
214	L'Anse-au-Clair	216
215	River of Ponds	215
216	Heart's Desire	213
217	Change Islands	208
218	Howley	205
219	Happy Adventure	200
220	Westport	195
221	St. Lewis	194
222	Pool's Cove	193
223	Woodstock	190
224	Red Harbour	189
225	Brighton	188
226	New Perlican	186
227	Long Harbour-Mount Arlington Heights	185
228	Riverhead	185
229	Bird Cove	179
230	Crow Head	177
231	Postville	177
232	Raleigh	177
233	Indian Bay	175
234	Goose Cove East	174
235	Conche	170
236	Frenchman's Cove	169
237	Red Bay	169
238	Trinity	169
239	Lushes Bight-Beaumount-Beaumont North	168
240	Pacquet	164
241	Lord's Cove	162
242	Brent's Cove	157
243	Point of Bay	154
244	Portugal Cove South	150
245	St. Brendan's	145
246	English Harbour East	139
247	Recontre East	139
248	Gaultois	136
249	Admirals Beach	135
250	Beachside	132
251	Point Anson	130
252	Little Bay East	127
253	Baine Harbour	124
254	Salvage	124
255	Cook's Harbour	123
256	Sandy Cove	122
257	St. Joseph's	115
258	West St. Modeste	111
259	Coachman's Cove	105
260	Little Bay	105
261	Miles Cove	104
262	Point Lance	102
263	Morrisville	101
264	King's Cove	90
265	Pinware	88
266	Point au Gaul	88
267	Nippers Harbour	85
268	Millertown	81
269	Aquaforte	80
270	Colinet	80
271	Terra Nova	73
272	Little Bay Islands	71
273	St. Shott's	66
274	Bellburns	53
275	Port Kirwan	52
276	Keels	51
278	Gallants	50
279	Duntara	30
280	Sally's Cove	20
281	Tilt Cove	5

== Ethnicity ==
More than half the population identified their ethnocultural ancestry as Canadian, while two-fifths identified English ancestry, and one-fifth identified Irish ancestry. However, Canadian is written on the census first, and many people write in other ethnic groups after it, which are listed in another section, so numbers do not necessarily represent accurate responses to ethnicity.

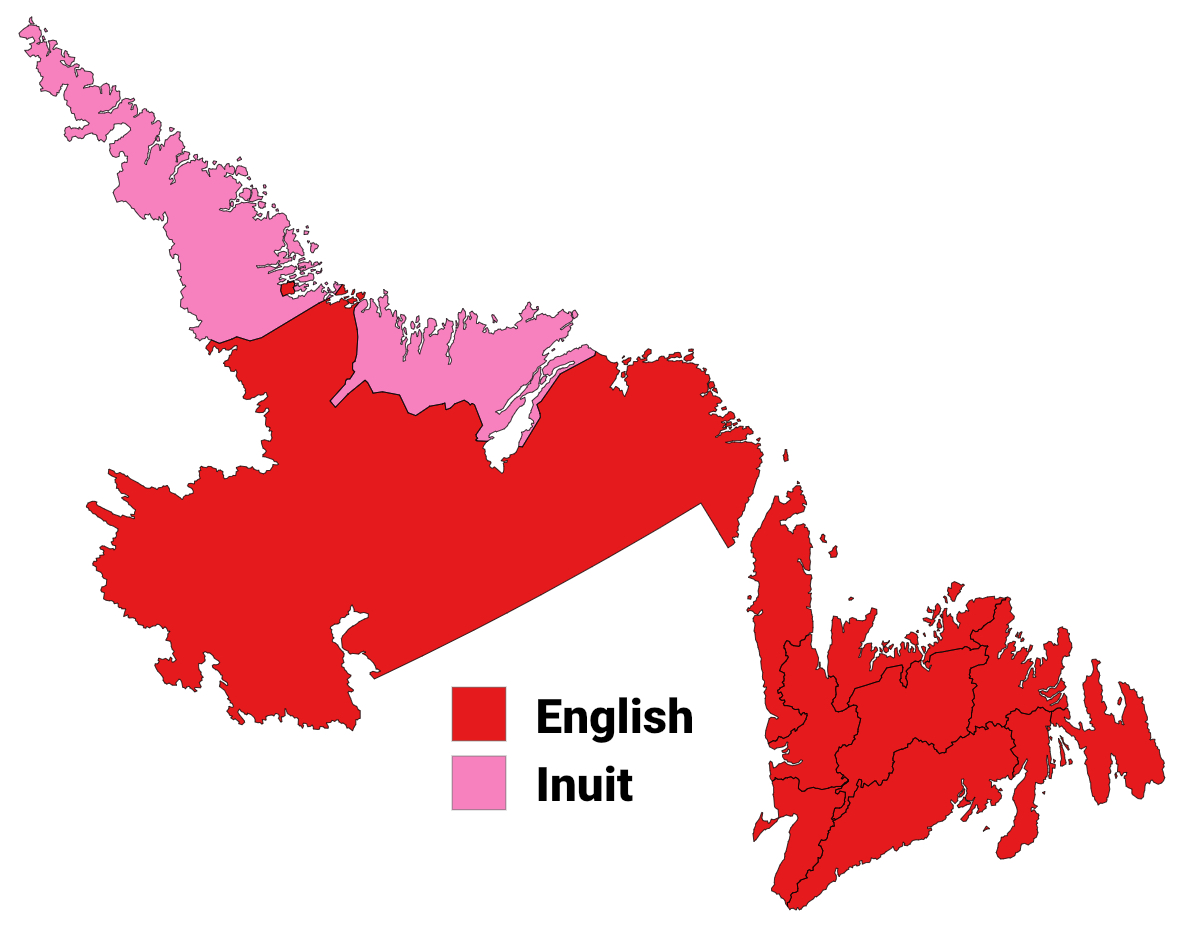
Largest ethnic origins by census division, 2021 census

More than 100,000 Newfoundlanders have applied for membership in the Qalipu Mi'kmaq First Nation Band, equivalent to one-fifth of the total population.

Ethnicity	2001	%	2021	%
Canadian	271,345	43.41%	125,120	24.9%
English	200,120	39.39%	175,045	34.9%
Irish	100,260	19.73%	122,115	24.3%
Scottish	30,295	5.96%	33,270	6.6%
French	27,785	5.47%	23,645	4.7%
Indigenous	16,030	3.16%	14,405	2.9%
Inuit	7,445	1.47%	9,365	1.9%
German	6,275	1.24%	7,335	1.5%
Métis	6,120	1.20%	6,715	1.3%
Newfoundlander	3,585	0.71%	34,640	6.9%
Welsh	2,790	0.55%	5,750	1.1%
Dutch (Netherlands)	1,385	0.27%	1,830	0.4%
Italian	1,180	0.23%	2,290	0.5%
Norwegian	1,180	0.23%	1,840	0.4%
Chinese	1,110	0.22%	2,265	0.5%
American (USA)	1,065	0.21%	2,180	0.4%
East Indian	940	0.19%	2,765	0.6%
British	925	0.18%	18,305	3.6%
Spanish	765	0.15%	1,160	0.2%
Portuguese	735	0.14%	1,215	0.2%
Polish	665	0.13%	1,290	0.3%
Swedish	655	0.13%	1,035	0.2%
Ukrainian	580	0.11%		
Lebanese	515	0.10%		
Danish	455	0.09%		
Jewish	370	0.07%	550	0.1%
Filipino	340	0.07%		
Russian	285	0.06%		
Greek	245	0.05%		
Hungarian (Magyar)	245	0.05%		
Austrian	225	0.04%		
African (Black), n.i.e.	180	0.04%		
Egyptian	165	0.03%		
Finnish	145	0.03%		
Black	120	0.02%		
Jamaican	120	0.02%		
Acadian	115	0.02%		
Arab, n.i.e.	115	0.02%		
Belgian	115	0.02%		
Czech	115	0.02%		
Romanian	115	0.02%		
South African	105	0.02%		

The same data on ethnocultural ancestry, grouped more geographically by Statistics Canada, are shown below:

Origins	2001	%
North American	274,755	54.08%
British Isles	266,010	52.36%
Aboriginal	28,065	5.52%
French	27,835	5.48%
Western European	7,705	1.52%
Southern European	3,285	0.65%
Northern European	2,510	0.49%
Eastern European	2,050	0.40%
East and Southeast Asian	1,685	0.33%

Origins	2001	%
South Asian	1,110	0.22%
Arab	915	0.18%
Other European	520	0.10%
African	465	0.09%
Caribbean	270	0.05%
West Asian	130	0.03%
Latin, Central and South American	75	0.01%
Oceania	45	0.01%

Percentages are calculated as a proportion of the total number of respondents (508,075) and may total more than 100% due to dual responses.
Only groups of more than 0.02% are shown

== Visible minorities and Indigenous peoples ==
Indigenous and visible minority identity (2021):
1. European Canadian (87.4%)
2. Visible minority (3.40%)
3. First Nations (5.70%)
4. Métis (1.50%)
5. Inuit (1.50%)
6. Other Indigenous (0.70%)

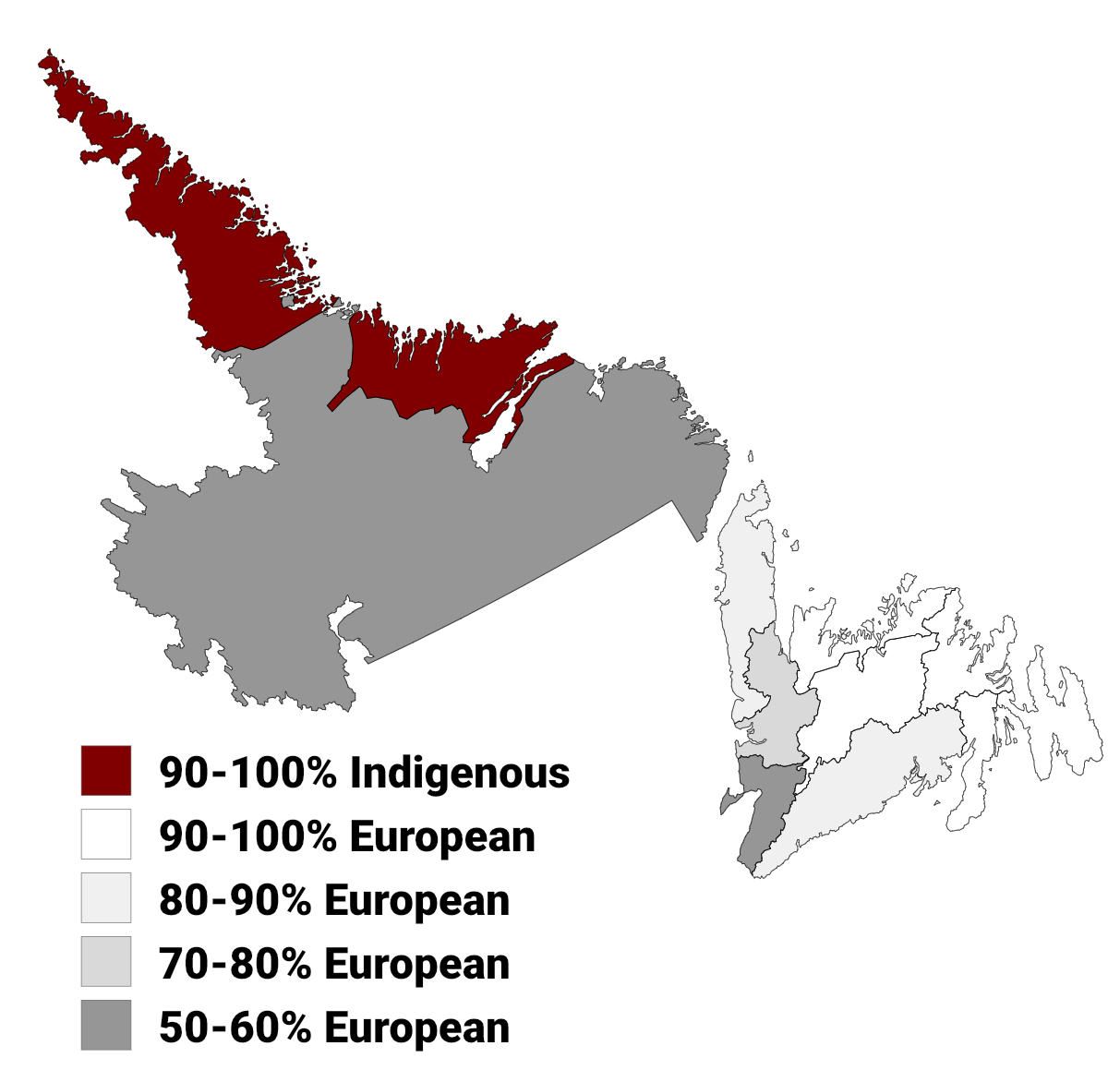
Largest panethnic groups in Newfoundland and Labrador by percentage of total population by census division, 2021 census

Visible minority & Indigenous population in Newfoundland and Labrador (1986–2021)
Group	Population	2021 census		2016 census		2011 census		2006 census		2001 census		1996 census		1991 census		1986 census	
Group	Population	Pop.	%	Pop.	%	Pop.	%	Pop.	%	Pop.	%	Pop.	%	Pop.	%	Pop.	%
Non-Indigenous / non-visible minority group	British Isles (Note: Including multiple responses.) (Note: 1996-present census populations for British Isles and French origins may be undercounts, due to the creation of the "Canadian" ethnic origin category. All citizens of Canada are classified as "Canadians" as defined by Canada's nationality laws. However, "Canadian" as an ethnic group has since 1996 been added to census questionnaires for possible ancestry. "Canadian" was included as an example on the English questionnaire and "Canadien" as an example on the French questionnaire. "The majority of respondents to this selection are from the eastern part of the country that was first settled. Respondents generally are visibly European (Anglophones and Francophones), however no-longer self identify with their ethnic ancestral origins. This response is attributed to a multitude or generational distance from ancestral lineage. Source 1: Jack Jedwab (April 2008). "Our 'Cense' of Self: the 2006 Census saw 1.6 million 'Canadian' Canadians Return to British and French origins" (PDF). Association for Canadian Studies. p. 2. Archived from the original (PDF) on October 2, 2011. "Virtually all persons who reported "Canadian" in 1996 had English or French as a mother tongue, were born in Canada and had both parents born inside Canada. This suggests that many of these respondents were people whose families have been in this country for several generations. In effect the "new Canadians" were persons that previously reported either British or French origins. Moreover in 1996 some 55% of people with both parents born in Canada reported Canadian (alone or in combination with other origins). By contrast, only 4% of people with both parents born outside Canada reported Canadian. Thus the Canadian response did not appeal widely to either immigrants or their children. Most important however was that nearly half of those persons reporting Canadian origin in 1996 were in Quebec this represented a majority of the mother tongue francophone population[...]In the 2001 Census, 11.7 million people, or 39% of the total population, reported Canadian as their ethnic origin, either alone or in combination with other origins. Some 4.9 million Quebecers out of 7.1 million individuals reported Canadian or "Canadien" thus accounting for nearly seven in ten persons (nearly eighty percent of francophones in Quebec)." Source 2: Don Kerr (2007). The Changing Face of Canada: Essential Readings in Population. Canadian Scholars' Press. pp. 313–317. ISBN 978-1-55130-322-2. Source 3: Jantzen (2006) Footnote 5: Note that Canadian and Canadien have been separated since the two terms mean different things. In English, it usually means someone whose family has been in Canada for multiple generations. In French it is referring to "Les Habitants", settlers of New France during the 17th and 18th centuries who earned their living primarily from agricultural labour. Source 4: Jantzen (2006): The reporting of French New World ancestries (Canadien, Québécois, and French-Canadian) is concentrated in the 4th+ generations; 79% of French-Canadian, 88% of Canadien and 90% of Québécois are in the 4th+generations category. Source 5: Jantzen (2005): According to Table 3, the 4th+ generations are highest because of a strong sense of belonging to their ethnic or cultural group among those respondents reporting the New World ancestries of Canadien and Québécois. Source 6: Jantzen (2006): For respondents of French and New World ancestries the pattern is different. Where generational data is available, it is possible to see that not all respondents reporting these ancestries report a high sense of belonging to their ethnic or cultural group. The high proportions are focused among those respondents that are in the 4th+ generations, and unlike with the British Isles example, the difference between the 2nd and 3rd generations to the 4th+ generation is more pronounced. Since these ancestries are concentrated in the 4th+ generations, their high proportions of sense of belonging to ethnic or cultural group push up the 4th+ generational results.)	268,890	53.55%	259,465	50.65%	290,400	57.25%	285,265	56.98%	266,010	52.36%	403,885	73.82%	539,045	95.59%	542,115	96.12%
Non-Indigenous / non-visible minority group	European, n.i.e. & n.o.s.	119,150	23.73%	143,830	28.08%	123,970	24.44%	135,085	26.98%	176,050	34.65%	70,370	12.86%	585	0.1%	540	0.1%
Non-Indigenous / non-visible minority group	French	25,190	5.02%	27,435	5.36%	29,335	5.78%	30,690	6.13%	27,835	5.48%	37,310	6.82%	36,280	6.43%	39,830	7.06%
Non-Indigenous / non-visible minority group	Western European	10,350	2.06%	11,045	2.16%	10,180	2.01%	9,720	1.94%	7,705	1.52%	9,290	1.7%	9,625	1.71%	8,755	1.55%
Non-Indigenous / non-visible minority group	Southern European	5,825	1.16%	4,765	0.93%	3,985	0.79%	4,250	0.85%	3,285	0.65%	3,830	0.7%	3,445	0.61%	2,325	0.41%
Non-Indigenous / non-visible minority group	Northern European	5,145	1.02%	3,940	0.77%	3,095	0.61%	3,310	0.66%	2,510	0.49%	3,150	0.58%	2,085	0.37%	1,450	0.26%
Non-Indigenous / non-visible minority group	Eastern European	4,150	0.83%	4,230	0.83%	3,575	0.7%	3,115	0.62%	2,050	0.4%	2,295	0.42%	1,985	0.35%	1,945	0.34%
Total non-Indigenous / non-visible minority population (Note: Single responses only unless otherwise specified.)		438,700	87.37%	454,710	88.77%	464,540	91.58%	471,435	94.17%	485,445	95.55%	530,130	96.89%	546,440	96.9%	550,965	97.69%
Indigenous (Note: Statistics Canada defines Indigenous identity as persons who identify with the Indigenous Peoples of Canada.) group	First Nations	28,435	5.66%	28,375	5.54%	19,315	3.81%	7,765	1.55%	7,035	1.38%	4,355	0.8%	5,840 (Note: Including multiple Indigenous responses.)	1.04%	4,470	0.79%
Indigenous group	Inuk (Inuit)	7,330	1.46%	6,450	1.26%	6,265	1.24%	4,715	0.94%	4,555	0.9%	4,120	0.75%	6,455	1.14%	3,580	0.63%
Indigenous group	Métis	7,330	1.46%	7,785	1.52%	7,660	1.51%	6,470	1.29%	5,480	1.08%	4,555	0.83%	1,605	0.28%	945	0.17%
Indigenous group	Indigenous responses, n.i.e.	2,765	0.55%	2,555	0.5%	2,300	0.45%	4,205	0.84%	1,505	0.3%	—N/a	—N/a	—N/a	—N/a	—N/a	—N/a
Indigenous group	Multiple Indigenous responses	685	0.14%	555	0.11%	260	0.05%	290	0.06%	190	0.04%	175	0.03%	—N/a	—N/a	605	0.11%
Total Indigenous population		46,545	9.27%	45,725	8.93%	35,800	7.06%	23,450	4.68%	18,780	3.7%	13,210	2.41%	13,260	2.35%	9,600	1.7%
Visible minority (Note: Statistics Canada defines visible minorities as defined in the Employment Equity Act which defines visible minorities as "persons, other than Aboriginal peoples, who are non-Caucasian in race or non-white in colour".) group	South Asian	4,550	0.91%	2,645	0.52%	1,855	0.37%	1,590	0.32%	1,005	0.2%	925	0.17%	1,010	0.18%	865	0.15%
Visible minority group	Black	3,590	0.71%	2,355	0.46%	1,450	0.29%	900	0.18%	840	0.17%	595	0.11%	510	0.09%	180	0.03%
Visible minority group	Filipino	2,265	0.45%	1,390	0.27%	350	0.07%	305	0.06%	260	0.05%	280	0.05%	220	0.04%	345	0.06%
Visible minority group	Chinese	2,000	0.4%	2,325	0.45%	1,645	0.32%	1,325	0.26%	925	0.18%	1,335	0.24%	1,105	0.2%	1,040	0.18%
Visible minority group	Arab	1,745	0.35%	1,375	0.27%	370	0.07%	545	0.11%	270	0.05%	—N/a	—N/a	—N/a	—N/a	—N/a	—N/a
Visible minority group	Latin American	750	0.15%	635	0.12%	185	0.04%	485	0.1%	85	0.02%	95	0.02%	170	0.03%	40	0.01%
Visible minority group	West Asian	550	0.11%	215	0.04%	150	0.03%	115	0.02%	85	0.02%	—N/a	—N/a	—N/a	—N/a	—N/a	—N/a
Visible minority group	Southeast Asian	510	0.1%	340	0.07%	320	0.06%	120	0.02%	120	0.02%	155	0.03%	125	0.02%	85	0.02%
Visible minority group	Multiple visible minorities	400	0.08%	250	0.05%	245	0.05%	60	0.01%	45	0.01%	45	0.01%	105	0.02%	80	0.01%
Visible minority group	Korean	220	0.04%	75	0.01%	80	0.02%	60	0.01%	105	0.02%	0	0%	55	0.01%	5	0%
Visible minority group	Visible minority, n.i.e.	205	0.04%	145	0.03%	210	0.04%	75	0.01%	45	0.01%	90	0.02%	10	0%	5	0%
Visible minority group	Japanese	80	0.02%	60	0.01%	65	0.01%	140	0.03%	70	0.01%	50	0.01%	30	0.01%	35	0.01%
Visible minority group	Arab/West Asian	—N/a	—N/a	—N/a	—N/a	—N/a	—N/a	—N/a	—N/a	—N/a	—N/a	230	0.04%	910	0.16%	730	0.13%
Total visible minority population		16,855	3.36%	11,815	2.31%	6,930	1.37%	5,720	1.14%	3,850	0.76%	3,815	0.7%	4,240	0.75%	3,420	0.61%
Total responses		502,100	98.34%	512,250	98.56%	507,270	98.59%	500,605	99.04%	508,075	99.05%	547,155	99.16%	563,940	99.2%	563,985	99.23%
Total population		510,550	100%	519,716	100%	514,536	100%	505,469	100%	512,930	100%	551,790	100%	568,475	100%	568,350	100%

== Languages ==
=== Knowledge of languages ===
The question on knowledge of languages allows for multiple responses. The following figures are from the 2021 Canadian Census, and lists languages that were selected by at least 0.2 per cent of respondents.

Knowledge of languages in Newfoundland and Labrador
Language	2021	
Language	Pop.	%
English	501,135	99.81%
French	26,130	5.2%
Arabic	2,195	0.44%
Spanish	2,085	0.42%
Innu (Montagnais)	1,925	0.38%
Tagalog	1,810	0.36%
Hindi	1,565	0.31%
Mandarin	1,170	0.23%
German	1,075	0.21%
Punjabi	1,040	0.21%
Bengali	875	0.17%
American Sign Language	875	0.17%

=== Mother tongue ===
Languages of Newfoundland and Labrador (2016):
1. English (96.9%)
2. French (0.50%)
3. Other language (2.30%)
4. Multiple (0.30%)

The 2006 Canadian census showed a population of 505,469.
Of the 499,830 singular responses to the census question concerning mother tongue the most commonly reported languages were:

		2006	%	2001	%
1.	English	488,405	97.71%	499,750	98.49%
2.	French	1,885	0.38%	2,180	0.43%
3.	Algonquian languages	1,625	0.33%	1,510	0.30%
	Montagnais–Naskapi	1,585	0.32%	1,495	0.29%
4.	Chinese	1,080	0.22%	525	0.10%
	Cantonese	185	0.04%	55	0.01%
	Mandarin	120	0.02%	25	~
5.	Spanish	670	0.13%	50	0.01%
6.	German	655	0.13%	340	0.07%
7.	Inuktitut	595	0.12%	550	0.11%
8.	Urdu	550	0.11%	90	0.02%
9.	Arabic	540	0.11%	210	0.04%
10.	Dutch	300	0.06%	95	0.02%
11.	Russian	225	0.05%	75	0.01%
12.	Scandinavian languages	220	0.04%	125	0.02%
	Norwegian	85	0.02%	40	0.01%
	Danish	65	0.01%	55	0.01%
	Swedish	65	0.01%	25	~
13.	Italian	195	0.04%	115	0.02%
14.	Germanic languages n.i.e.	180	0.04%	75	0.01%
15.	Tagalog (Filipino)	180	0.04%	130	0.03%
16.	Serbo-Croatian (all)	170	0.03%	130	0.03%
	Serbian	135	0.03%	15	~
	Croatian	35	0.01%	40	0.01%
	Serbo-Croatian	0	~	75	0.01%

		2006	%	2001	%
17.	Bengali	165	0.03%	55	0.01%
18.	Portuguese	150	0.03%	105	0.02%
19.	Hungarian	140	0.03%	45	0.01%
20.	Panjabi (Punjabi)	120	0.02%	95	0.02%
21.	African languages n.i.e.	100	0.02%	10	~
21.	Non-verbal languages	100	0.02%	N	N
23.	Bantu languages	95	0.02%	0	~
23.	Bulgarian	95	0.02%	75	0.01%
25.	Niger–Congo languages n.i.e.	85	0.13%	40	0.1%
26.	Romanian	75	0.02%	15	~
27.	Greek	70	0.01%	40	0.01%
27.	Japanese	70	0.01%	45	0.01%
29.	Telugu	65	0.01%	45	0.01%
30.	Persian	60	0.01%	70	0.01%
30.	Ukrainian	60	0.01%	20	~
32.	Czech	50	0.01%	15	~
32.	Gujarati	50	0.01%	50	0.01%
32.	Hindi	50	0.01%	55	0.01%
32.	Korean	50	0.01%	50	0.01%
36.	Malayalam	40	0.01%	10	~
37.	Turkish	40	0.01%	25	~
38.	Welsh	35	0.01%	20	~
39.	Gaelic languages	30	0.01%	10	~
40.

Note: "n.i.e.": not included elsewhere

There were also about 25 single-language responses for Amharic, 25 for Bisayan languages, 20 for Sinhala and 20 for Slovak. In addition, there were also 435 responses of English and a non-official language; 30 of French and a non-official language; 295 of English and French; and 10 of English, French, and a non-official language. (Figures shown are for the number of single language responses and the percentage of total single-language responses.)

== Religion ==
A 93.2% majority of Newfoundlanders identify as Christian. Among this group, Roman Catholics form a plurality of 38.4%. As Newfoundland and Labrador has received less recent immigration than the rest of Canada, a relatively small number of Christian denominations are represented in the province.

One well-established feature of Newfoundland's religious landscape is the Salvation Army, whose members are more widespread in Newfoundland and Labrador than any other province. Also notable are missionaries of the Moravian Church, who have a long history with the Labrador Inuit of Nunatsiavut, although they were not active in other regions of the province.

Religious groups in Newfoundland and Labrador (1981−2021)
Religious group	2021 Canadian census		2011 Canadian census		2001 Canadian census		1991 Canadian census		1981 Canadian census	
Religious group	Pop.	%	Pop.	%	Pop.	%	Pop.	%	Pop.	%
Christianity	413,915	82.44%	472,720	93.19%	493,485	97.13%	553,230	98.1%	557,225	98.84%
Irreligion	80,330	16%	31,330	6.18%	12,865	2.53%	9,270	1.64%	5,605	0.99%
Islam	3,995	0.8%	1,200	0.24%	625	0.12%	300	0.05%	100	0.02%
Hinduism	1,200	0.24%	635	0.13%	400	0.08%	445	0.08%	315	0.06%
Sikhism	855	0.17%	100	0.02%	130	0.03%	130	0.02%	65	0.01%
Buddhism	490	0.1%	400	0.08%	180	0.04%	105	0.02%	135	0.02%
Judaism	240	0.05%	175	0.03%	140	0.03%	125	0.02%	220	0.04%
Indigenous spirituality	105	0.02%	30	0.01%	50	0.01%	10	0%	10	0%
Other	965	0.19%	685	0.14%	200	0.04%	325	0.06%	75	0.01%
Total responses	502,100	98.34%	507,270	98.59%	508,075	99.05%	563,940	99.2%	563,750	99.31%
Total population	510,550	100%	514,536	100%	512,930	100%	568,475	100%	567,681	100%

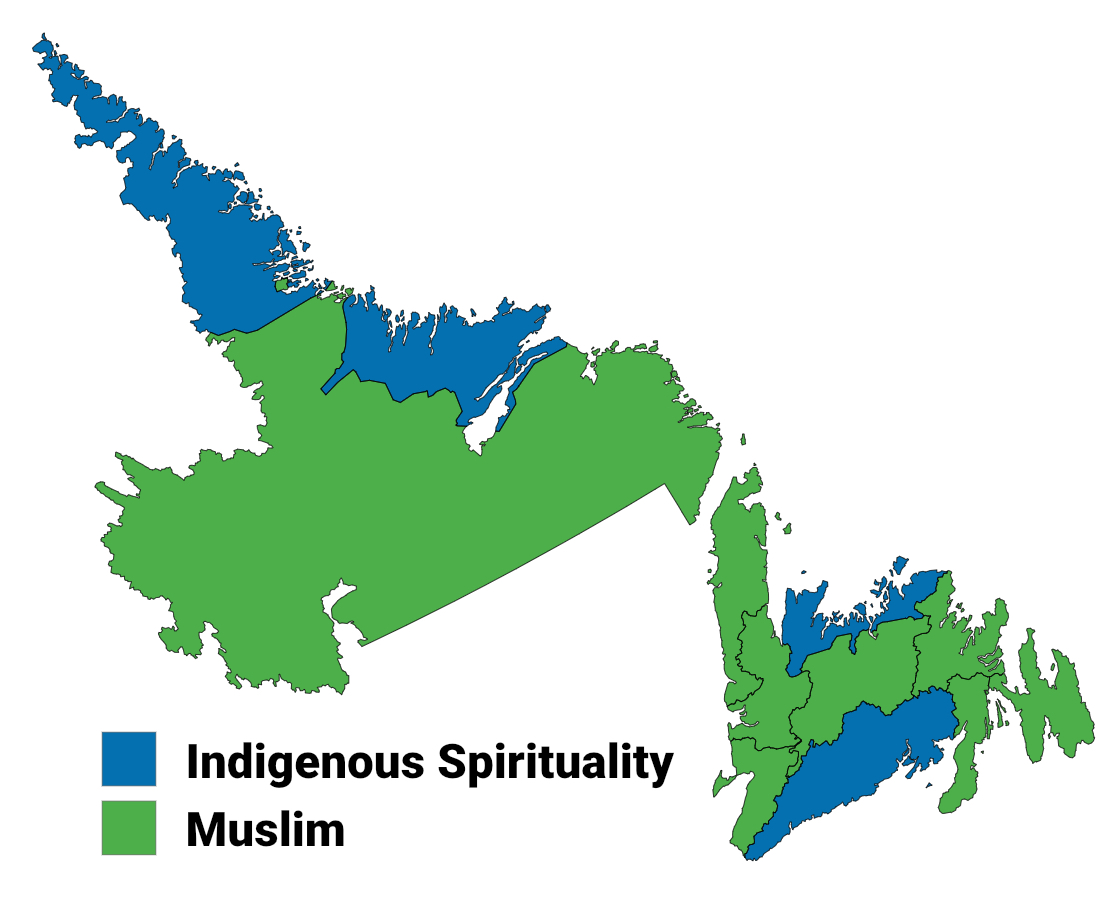
Largest non-Christian religion in Newfoundland and Labrador by census division, 2021 census

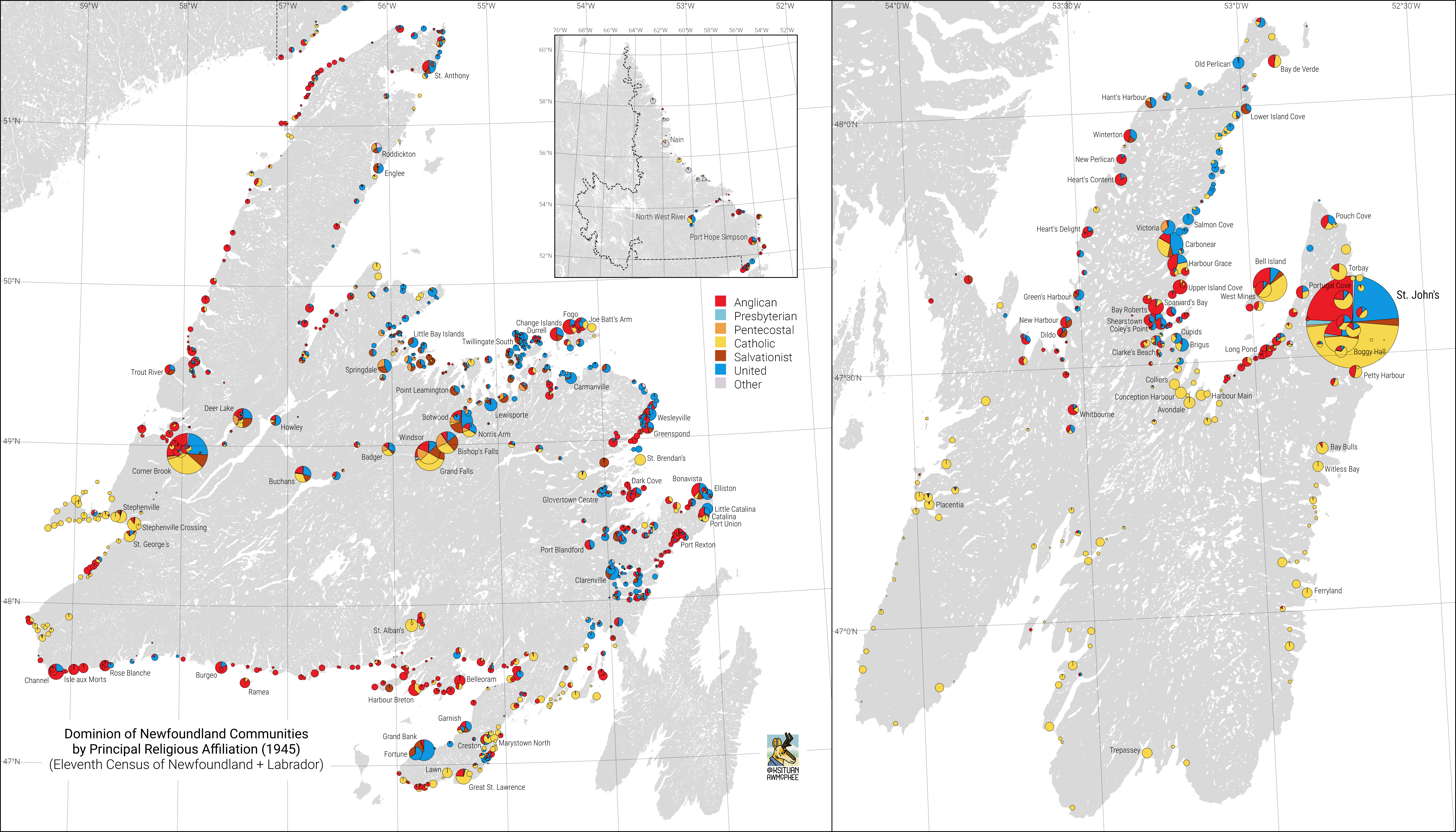
The Dominion of Newfoundland's final census of religion, 1945.

== Migration ==
=== Immigration ===
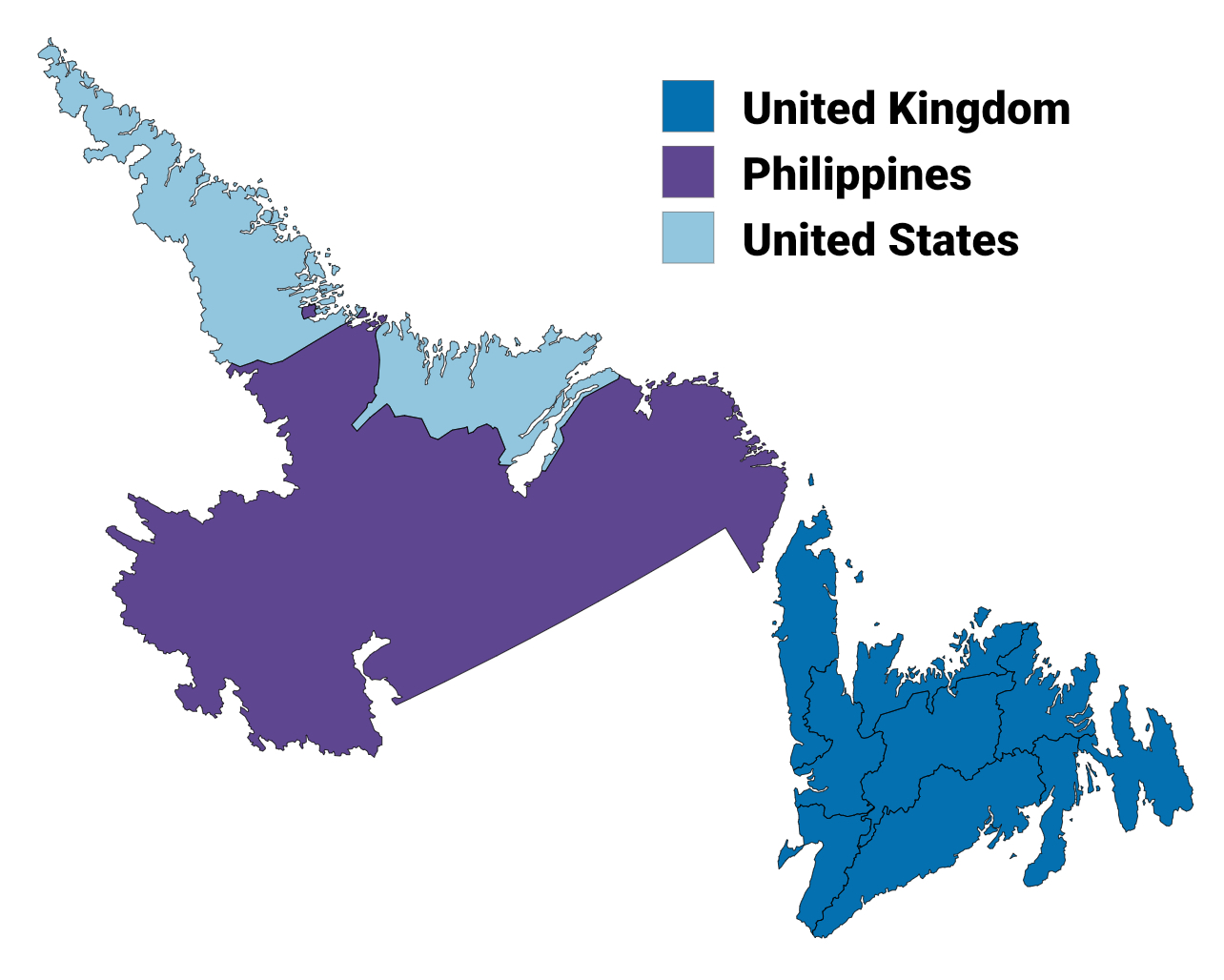
Largest nation of immigrants by census division, 2021 census

Newfoundland and Labrador Immigration Statistics
Year	Immigrant percentage	Immigrant population	Total population
1857	12.4%	15,239	122,638
1869	6.9%	10,158	146,536
1951	1.1%	3,829	361,416
1961	1.4%	6,269	457,853
1971	1.7%	8,945	522,105

The 2021 census reported that immigrants (individuals born outside Canada) comprise 14,250 persons or 2.8 percent of the total population of Newfoundland and Labrador.

Immigrants in Newfoundland and Labrador by country of birth
Country of birth	2021 census		2016 census		2011 census		2006 census		2001 census		1996 census		1991 census		1986 census		1981 census		1971 census		1961 census		1951 census	
Country of birth	Pop.	%	Pop.	%	Pop.	%	Pop.	%	Pop.	%	Pop.	%	Pop.	%	Pop.	%	Pop.	%	Pop.	%	Pop.	%	Pop.	%
United Kingdom	2,300	16.1%	2,215	18.3%	2,490	27.2%	2,335	27.9%	2,595	32.3%	3,015	35.5%	2,905	34.3%	3,340	37.4%	4,025	41.1%	3,835	42.9%	2,941	46.9%	1,973	51.5%
Philippines	1,650	11.6%	855	7.1%	155	1.7%	165	2%	175	2.2%	175	2.1%	155	1.8%	230	2.6%	265	2.7%	—N/a	—N/a	—N/a	—N/a	—N/a	—N/a
United States	1,390	9.8%	1,540	12.8%	1,575	17.2%	1,400	16.7%	1,600	19.9%	1,685	19.8%	1,850	21.9%	2,260	25.3%	2,255	23%	1,890	21.1%	1,116	17.8%	975	25.5%
India	835	5.9%	635	5.3%	375	4.1%	435	5.2%	465	5.8%	375	4.4%	365	4.3%	360	4%	345	3.5%	250	2.8%	18	0.3%	5	0.1%
China & Taiwan	680 (Note: China: 630 / Taiwan: 50)	4.8%	870 (Note: China: 835 / Taiwan: 35)	7.2%	630 (Note: China: 515 / Taiwan: 115)	6.9%	370 (Note: China: 340 / Taiwan: 30)	4.4%	280 (Note: China: 240 / Taiwan: 40)	3.5%	410 (Note: China: 350 / Taiwan: 60)	4.8%	260 (Note: China: 235 / Taiwan: 25)	3.1%	270 (Note: China: 260 / Taiwan: 10)	3%	255 (Note: China: 120 / Taiwan: 135)	2.6%	260	2.9%	242	3.9%	141	3.7%
Syria & Lebanon	565 (Note: Syria: 485 / Lebanon: 80)	4%	350 (Note: Syria: 315 / Lebanon: 35)	2.9%	10 (Note: Syria: 10 / Lebanon: 0)	0.1%	50 (Note: Syria: 10 / Lebanon: 40)	0.6%	35 (Note: Syria: 15 / Lebanon: 20)	0.4%	20 (Note: Syria: 0 / Lebanon: 20)	0.2%	10 (Note: Syria: 0 / Lebanon: 10)	0.1%	10 (Note: Syria: 0 / Lebanon: 10)	0.1%	10	0.1%	—N/a	—N/a	—N/a	—N/a	—N/a	—N/a
Nigeria & Ghana	485 (Note: Nigeria: 455 / Ghana: 30)	3.4%	225 (Note: Nigeria: 185 / Ghana: 40)	1.9%	110 (Note: Nigeria: 110 / Ghana: 0)	1.2%	30 (Note: Nigeria: 10 / Ghana: 20)	0.4%	30 (Note: Nigeria: 20 / Ghana: 10)	0.4%	30 (Note: Nigeria: 20 / Ghana: 10)	0.4%	25	0.3%	5	0.1%	10	0.1%	—N/a	—N/a	—N/a	—N/a	—N/a	—N/a
Ireland	290	2%	180	1.5%	180	2%	150	1.8%	135	1.7%	240	2.8%	210	2.5%	235	2.6%	110	1.1%	300	3.4%	303	4.8%	172	4.5%
Jamaica & Trinidad and Tobago	280 (Note: Jamaica: 220 / Trinidad and Tobago: 60)	2%	145 (Note: Jamaica: 115 / Trinidad and Tobago: 30)	1.2%	35 (Note: Jamaica: 15 / Trinidad and Tobago: 20)	0.4%	55 (Note: Jamaica: 40 / Trinidad and Tobago: 15)	0.7%	55 (Note: Jamaica: 15 / Trinidad and Tobago: 40)	0.7%	60 (Note: Jamaica: 10 / Trinidad and Tobago: 50)	0.7%	65 (Note: Jamaica: 30 / Trinidad and Tobago: 35)	0.8%	45 (Note: Jamaica: 15 / Trinidad and Tobago: 30)	0.5%	95	1%	35	0.4%	28 (Note: All individuals born in the British West Indies.)	0.4%	11	0.3%
Germany & Austria	260 (Note: Germany: 245 / Austria: 15)	1.8%	405 (Note: Germany: 365 / Austria: 40)	3.4%	360 (Note: Germany: 320 / Austria: 40)	3.9%	405 (Note: Germany: 385 / Austria: 20)	4.8%	410 (Note: Germany: 400 / Austria: 10)	5.1%	325 (Note: Germany: 295 / Austria: 30)	3.8%	360 (Note: Germany: 315 / Austria: 45)	4.3%	405 (Note: Germany: 380 / Austria: 25)	4.5%	525 (Note: Germany: 500 / Austria: 25)	5.4%	710	7.9%	536	8.6%	73	1.9%
Bangladesh	230	1.6%	160	1.3%	120	1.3%	45	0.5%	35	0.4%	10	0.1%	40	0.5%	0	0%	60	0.6%	—N/a	—N/a	—N/a	—N/a	—N/a	—N/a
Eritrea & Ethiopia	230 (Note: Eritrea: 155 / Ethiopia: 75)	1.6%	105 (Note: Eritrea: 55 / Ethiopia: 50)	0.9%	60 (Note: Eritrea: 60 / Ethiopia: 0)	0.7%	40 (Note: Eritrea: 0 / Ethiopia: 40)	0.5%	0 (Note: Eritrea: 0 / Ethiopia: 0)	0%	0	0%	0	0%	5	0.1%	—N/a	—N/a	—N/a	—N/a	—N/a	—N/a	—N/a	—N/a
Pakistan	215	1.5%	245	2%	205	2.2%	170	2%	70	0.9%	10	0.1%	25	0.3%	20	0.2%	20	0.2%	20	0.2%	—N/a	—N/a	—N/a	—N/a
France & Belgium	210 (Note: France: 195 / Belgium: 15)	1.5%	175 (Note: France: 160 / Belgium: 15)	1.4%	75 (Note: France: 75 / Belgium: 0)	0.8%	115 (Note: France: 95 / Belgium: 20)	1.4%	130 (Note: France: 110 / Belgium: 20)	1.6%	100 (Note: France: 85 / Belgium: 15)	1.2%	55 (Note: France: 45 / Belgium: 10)	0.6%	130 (Note: France: 120 / Belgium: 10)	1.5%	140 (Note: France: 125 / Belgium: 15)	1.4%	190	2.1%	165	2.6%	39	1%
Egypt	205	1.4%	215	1.8%	75	0.8%	125	1.5%	110	1.4%	140	1.6%	75	0.9%	45	0.5%	10	0.1%	—N/a	—N/a	—N/a	—N/a	—N/a	—N/a
Russia & Ukraine	200 (Note: Russia: 125 / Ukraine: 75)	1.4%	250 (Note: Russia: 165 / Ukraine: 85)	2.1%	85 (Note: Russia: 85 / Ukraine: 0)	0.9%	85 (Note: Russia: 75 / Ukraine: 10)	1%	20 (Note: Russia: 20 / Ukraine: 0)	0.2%	155 (Note: Includes total persons born in all republics of the Soviet Union.)	1.8%	140	1.7%	45	0.5%	40	0.4%	65	0.7%	182	2.9%	91	2.4%
Iraq	190	1.3%	220	1.8%	95	1%	85	1%	30	0.4%	15	0.2%	10	0.1%	5	0.1%	—N/a	—N/a	—N/a	—N/a	—N/a	—N/a	—N/a	—N/a
South Africa	185	1.3%	135	1.1%	160	1.7%	125	1.5%	140	1.7%	150	1.8%	115	1.4%	40	0.4%	5	0.1%	—N/a	—N/a	24	0.4%	5	0.1%
Scandinavia (Note: Includes Denmark, Finland, Iceland, Norway and Sweden.)	180	1.3%	120	1%	85	0.9%	85	1%	125	1.6%	100	1.2%	100	1.2%	115	1.3%	175	1.8%	100	1.1%	69	1.1%	77	2%
Sudan & South Sudan	175	1.2%	45	0.4%	50	0.5%	105	1.3%	0	0%	10	0.1%	0	0%	5	0.1%	5	0.1%	—N/a	—N/a	—N/a	—N/a	—N/a	—N/a
Colombia	145	1%	110	0.9%	55	0.6%	120	1.4%	15	0.2%	25	0.3%	10	0.1%	15	0.2%	—N/a	—N/a	—N/a	—N/a	—N/a	—N/a	—N/a	—N/a
Former Yugoslavia	140	1%	160	1.3%	75	0.8%	95	1.1%	160	2%	100	1.2%	10	0.1%	15	0.2%	55	0.6%	5	0.1%	10	0.2%	2	0.1%
Iran	140	1%	70	0.6%	130	1.4%	25	0.3%	40	0.5%	20	0.2%	50	0.6%	95	1.1%	35	0.4%	—N/a	—N/a	—N/a	—N/a	—N/a	—N/a
Australia & New Zealand	125	0.9%	65	0.5%	100	1.1%	30	0.4%	25	0.3%	65	0.8%	85	1%	70	0.8%	65	0.7%	60	0.7%	39	0.6%	11	0.3%
Jordan	110	0.8%	90	0.7%	0	0%	0	0%	15	0.2%	0	0%	—N/a	—N/a	—N/a	—N/a	—N/a	—N/a	—N/a	—N/a	—N/a	—N/a	—N/a	—N/a
South Korea	105	0.7%	35	0.3%	45	0.5%	10	0.1%	40	0.5%	0	0%	30	0.4%	5	0.1%	25	0.3%	—N/a	—N/a	—N/a	—N/a	—N/a	—N/a
Netherlands	100	0.7%	100	0.8%	75	0.8%	145	1.7%	90	1.1%	90	1.1%	105	1.2%	145	1.6%	80	0.8%	115	1.3%	155	2.5%	21	0.5%
Romania	100	0.7%	50	0.4%	55	0.6%	65	0.8%	50	0.6%	10	0.1%	15	0.2%	10	0.1%	5	0.1%	0	0%	8	0.1%	3	0.1%
Libya	100	0.7%	30	0.2%	0	0%	15	0.2%	0	0%	0	0%	0	0%	0	0%	5	0.1%	—N/a	—N/a	—N/a	—N/a	—N/a	—N/a
Sri Lanka	100	0.7%	115	1%	105	1.1%	75	0.9%	40	0.5%	75	0.9%	65	0.8%	10	0.1%	75	0.8%	—N/a	—N/a	—N/a	—N/a	—N/a	—N/a
DR Congo & Cameroon	100 (Note: DR Congo: 80 / Cameroon: 20)	0.7%	50 (Note: DR Congo: 35 / Cameroon: 15)	0.4%	35 (Note: DR Congo: 35 / Cameroon: 0)	0.4%	10 (Note: DR Congo: 10 / Cameroon: 0)	0.1%	10 (Note: DR Congo: 10 / Cameroon: 0)	0.1%	10 (Note: DR Congo: 10 / Cameroon: 0)	0.1%	0	0%	0	0%	0	0%	—N/a	—N/a	—N/a	—N/a	—N/a	—N/a
Italy	95	0.7%	80	0.7%	25	0.3%	45	0.5%	75	0.9%	80	0.9%	45	0.5%	70	0.8%	110	1.1%	65	0.7%	88	1.4%	8	0.2%
Vietnam	90	0.6%	30	0.2%	40	0.4%	15	0.2%	95	1.2%	80	0.9%	75	0.9%	60	0.7%	115	1.2%	—N/a	—N/a	—N/a	—N/a	—N/a	—N/a
Kenya & Tanzania & Uganda	85 (Note: Kenya: 45 / Tanzania: 25 / Uganda: 15)	0.6%	120 (Note: Kenya: 25 / Tanzania: 50 / Uganda: 45)	1%	115 (Note: Kenya: 25 / Tanzania: 25 / Uganda: 65)	1.3%	45 (Note: Kenya: 25 / Tanzania: 10 / Uganda: 10)	0.5%	55 (Note: Kenya: 35 / Tanzania: 10 / Uganda: 10)	0.7%	65 (Note: Kenya: 15 / Tanzania: 20 / Uganda: 30)	0.8%	65 (Note: Kenya: 20 / Tanzania: 35 / Uganda: 10)	0.8%	40 (Note: Kenya: 20 / Tanzania: 10 / Uganda: 10)	0.4%	70	0.7%	—N/a	—N/a	—N/a	—N/a	—N/a	—N/a
Hong Kong	85	0.6%	80	0.7%	85	0.9%	110	1.3%	30	0.4%	95	1.1%	100	1.2%	70	0.8%	60	0.6%	—N/a	—N/a	—N/a	—N/a	—N/a	—N/a
Brazil	85	0.6%	30	0.2%	0	0%	15	0.2%	10	0.1%	10	0.1%	0	0%	5	0.1%	0	0%	—N/a	—N/a	—N/a	—N/a	—N/a	—N/a
Portugal	80	0.6%	135	1.1%	90	1%	115	1.4%	105	1.3%	80	0.9%	135	1.6%	190	2.1%	185	1.9%	180	2%	—N/a	—N/a	—N/a	—N/a
Malaysia & Singapore	70 (Note: Malaysia: 50 / Singapore: 20)	0.5%	50 (Note: Malaysia: 30 / Singapore: 20)	0.4%	35 (Note: Malaysia: 25 / Singapore: 10)	0.4%	35 (Note: Malaysia: 25 / Singapore: 10)	0.4%	40 (Note: Malaysia: 30 / Singapore: 10)	0.5%	70 (Note: Malaysia: 50 / Singapore: 20)	0.8%	25 (Note: Malaysia: 15 / Singapore: 10)	0.3%	35 (Note: Malaysia: 25 / Singapore: 10)	0.4%	—N/a	—N/a	—N/a	—N/a	—N/a	—N/a	—N/a	—N/a
Algeria & Tunisia	70 (Note: Algeria: 30 / Tunisia: 40)	0.5%	30 (Note: Algeria: 30 / Tunisia: 0)	0.2%	20 (Note: Algeria: 20 / Tunisia: 0)	0.2%	20 (Note: Algeria: 10 / Tunisia: 10)	0.2%	20 (Note: Algeria: 10 / Tunisia: 10)	0.2%	0	0%	0	0%	5	0.1%	5	0.1%	—N/a	—N/a	—N/a	—N/a	—N/a	—N/a
Poland	65	0.5%	75	0.6%	60	0.7%	60	0.7%	90	1.1%	75	0.9%	110	1.3%	95	1.1%	55	0.6%	50	0.6%	125	2%	76	2%
United Arab Emirates	60	0.4%	60	0.5%	0	0%	0	0%	0	0%	0	0%	—N/a	—N/a	—N/a	—N/a	—N/a	—N/a	—N/a	—N/a	—N/a	—N/a	—N/a	—N/a
Saudi Arabia	60	0.4%	40	0.3%	25	0.3%	30	0.4%	15	0.2%	0	0%	—N/a	—N/a	—N/a	—N/a	—N/a	—N/a	—N/a	—N/a	—N/a	—N/a	—N/a	—N/a
Thailand	55	0.4%	50	0.4%	50	0.5%	25	0.3%	15	0.2%	10	0.1%	15	0.2%	15	0.2%	—N/a	—N/a	—N/a	—N/a	—N/a	—N/a	—N/a	—N/a
Zimbabwe	55	0.4%	45	0.4%	15	0.2%	10	0.1%	0	0%	0	0%	—N/a	—N/a	—N/a	—N/a	—N/a	—N/a	—N/a	—N/a	—N/a	—N/a	—N/a	—N/a
Switzerland	55	0.4%	35	0.3%	30	0.3%	30	0.4%	15	0.2%	10	0.1%	20	0.2%	35	0.4%	15	0.2%	25	0.3%	11	0.2%	3	0.1%
Turkey	55	0.4%	30	0.2%	30	0.3%	20	0.2%	10	0.1%	10	0.1%	10	0.1%	15	0.2%	5	0.1%	—N/a	—N/a	—N/a	—N/a	—N/a	—N/a
Cuba	50	0.4%	85	0.7%	10	0.1%	45	0.5%	15	0.2%	20	0.2%	25	0.3%	5	0.1%	—N/a	—N/a	—N/a	—N/a	—N/a	—N/a	—N/a	—N/a
El Salvador & Guatemala & Nicaragua	45 (Note: El Salvador: 35 / Guatemala: 0 / Nicaragua: 10)	0.3%	55 (Note: El Salvador: 10 / Guatemala: 15 / Nicaragua: 30)	0.5%	10 (Note: El Salvador: 10 / Guatemala: 0 / Nicaragua: 0)	0.1%	95 (Note: El Salvador: 95 / Guatemala: 0 / Nicaragua: 0)	1.1%	20 (Note: El Salvador: 10 / Guatemala: 10 / Nicaragua: 0)	0.2%	10 (Note: El Salvador: 10 / Guatemala: 0 / Nicaragua: 0)	0.1%	20 (Note: El Salvador: 20 / Guatemala: 0 / Nicaragua: 0)	0.2%	5 (Note: El Salvador: 5 / Guatemala: 0 / Nicaragua: 0)	0.1%	25	0.3%	—N/a	—N/a	—N/a	—N/a	—N/a	—N/a
Israel & Palestine	40	0.3%	20	0.2%	10	0.1%	20	0.2%	10	0.1%	0	0%	0	0%	0	0%	15	0.2%	—N/a	—N/a	—N/a	—N/a	—N/a	—N/a
Czech Republic & Slovakia	35	0.2%	20	0.2%	15	0.2%	75	0.9%	40	0.5%	35	0.4%	65	0.8%	15	0.2%	30	0.3%	20	0.2%	9	0.1%	1	0%
Total immigrants	14,250	2.8%	12,075	2.4%	9,160	1.8%	8,380	1.7%	8,030	1.6%	8,490	1.6%	8,465	1.5%	8,920	1.6%	9,785	1.7%	8,945	1.7%	6,269	1.4%	3,829	1.1%
Total responses	502,100	98.3%	512,255	98.6%	507,270	98.6%	500,605	99%	508,075	99.1%	547,160	99.2%	563,935	99.2%	564,005	99.2%	563,750	99.3%	522,105	100%	457,853	100%	361,416	100%
Total population	510,550	100%	519,716	100%	514,536	100%	505,469	100%	512,930	100%	551,792	100%	568,474	100%	568,349	100%	567,681	100%	522,104	100%	457,853	100%	361,416	100%

=== Recent immigration ===
The 2021 Canadian census counted a total of 4,270 people who immigrated to Newfoundland and Labrador between 2016 and 2021.

Recent immigrants to Newfoundland and Labrador by Country of birth (2016 to 2021)
Country of Birth	Population	% recent immigrants
Philippines	940	22%
Syria	400	9.4%
India	325	7.6%
Nigeria	300	7%
China	195	4.6%
United States	145	3.4%
Jamaica	140	3.3%
United Kingdom	125	2.9%
Pakistan	105	2.5%
Eritrea	100	2.3%
Bangladesh	80	1.9%
Sudan	70	1.6%
Ireland	60	1.4%
South Africa	60	1.4%
Iraq	60	1.4%
Libya	55	1.3%
Democratic Republic of the Congo	55	1.3%
Lebanon	55	1.3%
Egypt	35	0.8%
Tunisia	35	0.8%
Iran	35	0.8%
South Korea	35	0.8%
Vietnam	35	0.8%
Trinidad and Tobago	30	0.7%
Brazil	30	0.7%
Total recent immigrants	4,270	100%

=== Interprovincial migration ===
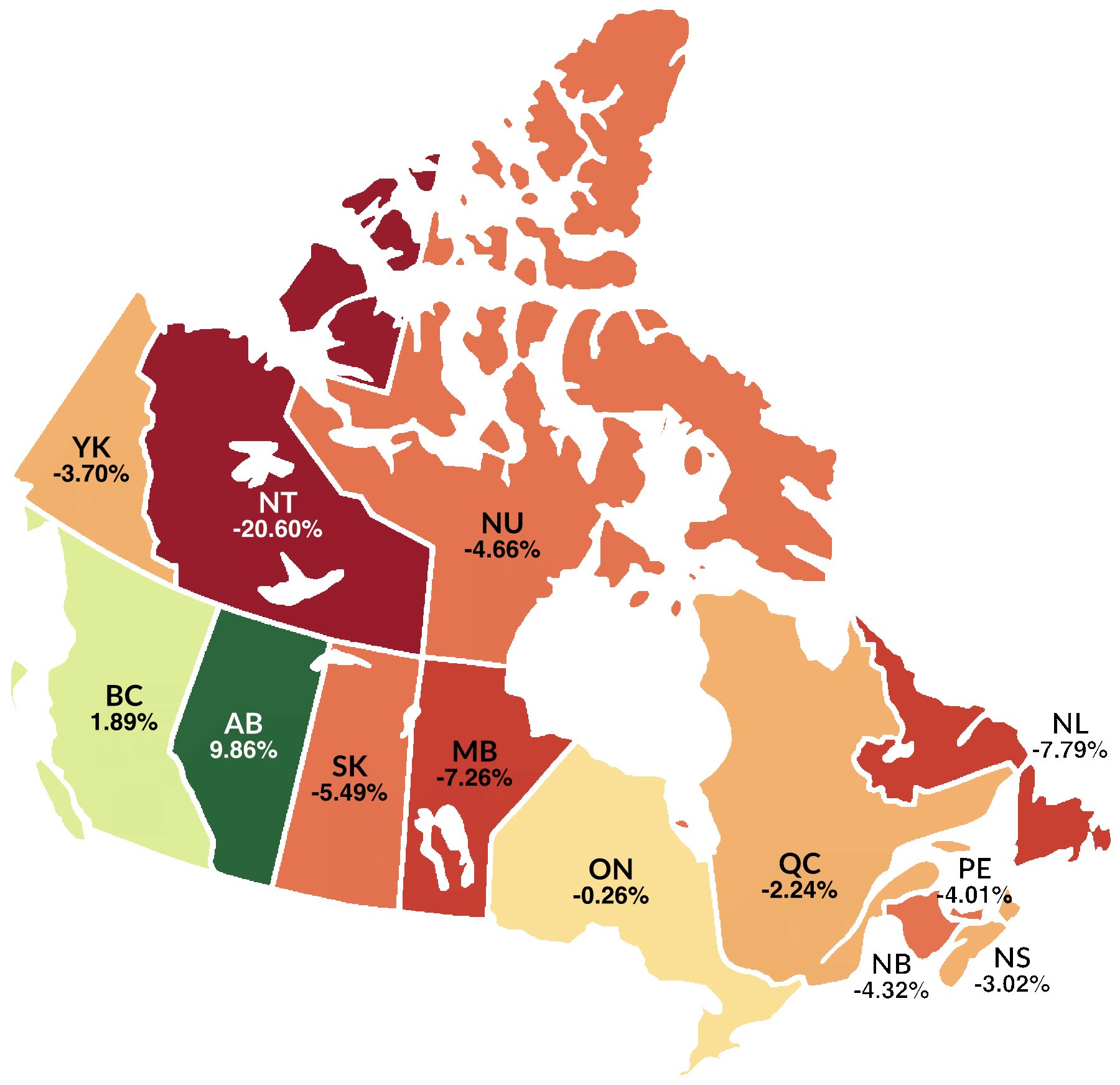
Net cumulative interprovincial migration per Province from 1997 to 2017, as a share of population of each Provinces

Since it started being recorded in 1971, Newfoundland and Labrador is the province that has lost the biggest share of its population to interprovincial migration, which was especially high in the 1990s. Out-migration from the province was curtailed in 2008 and net migration stayed positive through 2014, when it again dropped due to bleak finances and rising unemployment (caused by falling oil prices). With the announcement of the 2016 provincial budget, St. John's Telegram columnist Russell Wangersky published the column "Get out if you can", which urged young Newfoundlanders to leave the province to avoid future hardships.

Interprovincial migration in Newfoundland and Labrador
	In-migrants	Out-migrants	Net migration
2008–09	10,262	8,385	1,877
2009–10	8,998	7,440	1,558
2010–11	7,785	7,755	30
2011–12	8,173	7,628	545
2012–13	7,283	6,788	495
2013–14	6,994	6,760	234
2014–15	7,012	6,851	161
2015–16	6,600	6,368	232
2016–17	5,400	6,830	−1,430
2017–18	5,187	7,920	−2,733
2018–19	5,207	9,706	−4,501

Source: Statistics Canada

== See also ==
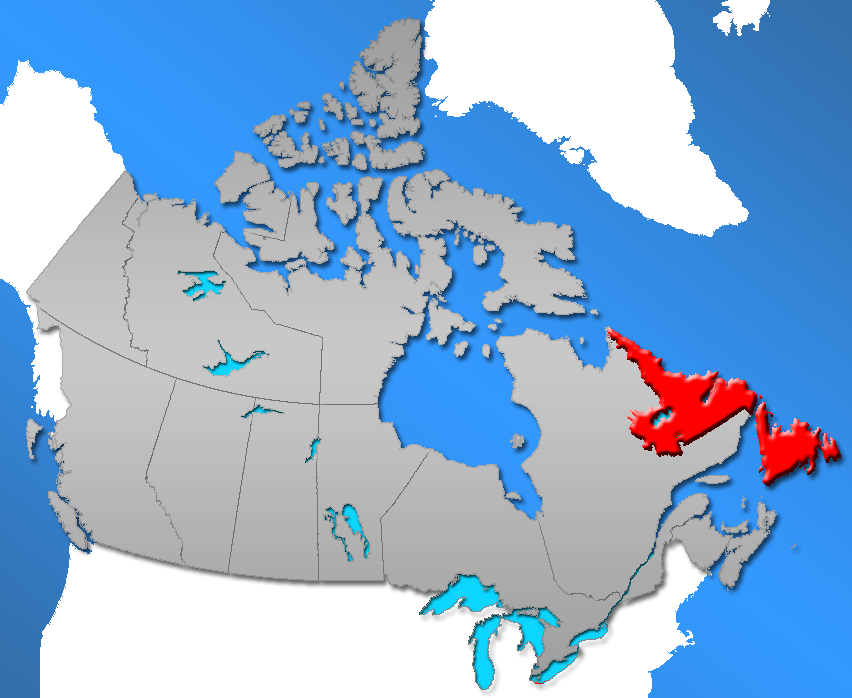
Demographics of Canada's provinces and territories
- Demographics of Canada
- Population of Canada by province and territory
