= Division No. 5, Newfoundland and Labrador =

Census division in Canada

Division No. 5
- Census division
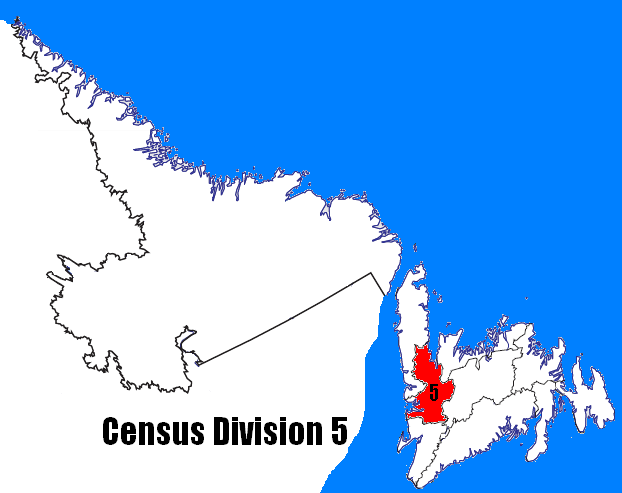
- Coordinates: 48°57′33″N 57°55′34″W
- Country: Canada
- Province: Newfoundland and Labrador

Government
  - MPs: Carol Anstey (Cons)

Area
  - Total: 10,366.48 km^{2} (4,002.52 sq mi)
- As of 2016

Population (2016)
  - Total: 42,014
  - Density: 4.0529/km^{2} (10.497/sq mi)

Census Division No. 5 is a Statistics Canada statistical division composed of the areas of the province of Newfoundland and Labrador called Humber Valley, Bay of Islands, and White Bay. It covers a land area of 10,365.63 km² (4,002.19 sq mi), and had a population of 42,014 according to the 2016 census.

== Cities ==
- Corner Brook

== Towns ==
- Cormack
- Cox's Cove
- Deer Lake
- Gillams
- Hampden
- Howley
- Hughes Brook
- Humber Arm South
- Irishtown-Summerside
- Jackson's Arm
- Lark Harbour
- Massey Drive
- McIvers
- Meadows
- Mount Moriah
- Pasadena
- Reidville
- Steady Brook
- York Harbour

== Unorganized subdivisions ==
- Subdivision A (Includes: St. Jude's, and Hinds Lake)
- Subdivision C (Includes: Spruce Brook, George's Lake, Pinchgut Lake)
- Subdivision D (Includes: North Arm, Middle Arm, Goose Arm, Serpentine Lake)
- Subdivision E (Includes: Galeville, The Beaches)
- Subdivision F (Includes: Pynn's Brook, Little Rapids, Humber Valley Resort)
- Subdivision G (Includes: Pollards Point, Sops Arm)

== Demographics ==
Historical populations Division No. 5, NL
Year	Pop.	±%
1951	28,089	—
1961	39,086	+39.2%
1971	44,880	+14.8%
1976	46,330	+3.2%
1981	46,901	+1.2%
1986	45,648	−2.7%
1991	45,314	−0.7%
1996	44,319	−2.2%
2001	40,466	−8.7%
2006	40,805	+0.8%
2011	41,004	+0.5%
2016	42,014	+2.5%
2021	40,396	−3.9%

In the 2021 Census of Population conducted by Statistics Canada, Division No. 5 had a population of 40,396 living in 17,967 of its 20,875 total private dwellings, a change of −3.9% from its 2016 population of 42,014. With a land area of 10,293.76 km^{2} (3,974.44 sq mi), it had a population density of 3.9/km^{2} (10.2/sq mi) in 2021.

== Sources ==
- "Division No. 5, Newfoundland and Labrador (Code 1005) Census Profile". 2011 census. Government of Canada - Statistics Canada.
