= Humber Arm =

Bay of Newfoundland and Labrador

- The Humber Arm, Bay of Islands
- Interactive map of Humber Arm
- Location: Western Newfoundland, Newfoundland and Labrador, Canada
- Coordinates: 49°00′07″N 58°05′29″W
- Type: Fjord / arm of a bay
- Part of: Bay of Islands
- Primary inflows: Humber River
- Primary outflows: Bay of Islands → Gulf of St. Lawrence
- Basin countries: Canada
- Settlements: Corner Brook, Humber Arm South, Frenchman's Cove

The Humber Arm is the southernmost arm of the Bay of Islands on the west coast of Newfoundland. The arm has the highest concentration of fresh water of the entire bay, due to inflow of the Humber River.

The Humber is one of the major rivers on the island of Newfoundland, making the Bay of Islands an important estuary. Near the mouth of the Humber River appropriately named "Humber Mouth", is the city of Corner Brook (2006 pop.: 20,083), as well as several neighbouring suburbs. The Humber River was used for many years to float logs down to the Bay of Islands where a large Bowater pulp and paper mill at Corner Brook turned them into paper products. Today this mill is owned by Kruger Inc and its logs are transported by truck from the Goose Arm area and the Northern Peninsula and by barge from Labrador and Quebec. Although the river is mainly used for recreational purposes, the bay still sees active shipping to and from Corner Brook's port, known as Western Terminals and is used by MSC and various Cruise lines, most notably the Cunard Line with the supership Queen Mary 2.

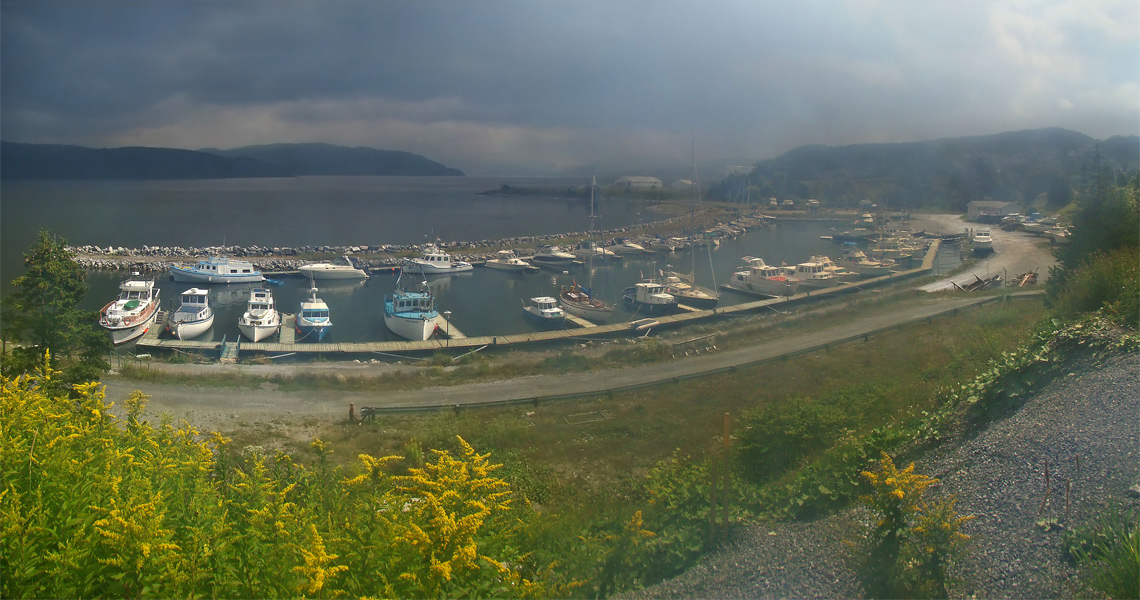
Petries, on the southern shore of the Humber Arm

Other communities surrounding the Humber Arm include Mount Moriah, Humber Arm South, Lark Harbour, Hughes Brook, Irishtown-Summerside, Meadows, Gillams, and McIvers.

== See also ==
- Bay of Islands
- Humber River
- Corner Brook
- Curling
- Newfoundland and Labrador
