= Woods Island, Newfoundland and Labrador =

Woods Island Innismara
- Abandoned Town
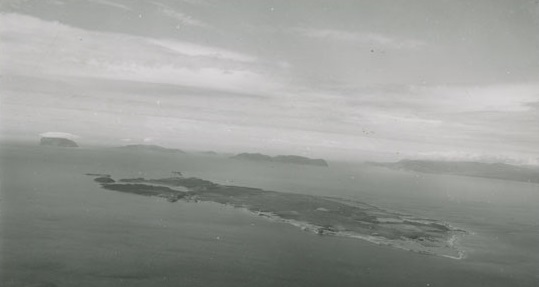
- Woods Island from the air, circa 1950

- Location of Woods Island in Newfoundland
- Coordinates: 49°05′54.0″N 58°11′41.5″W
- Country: Canada
- Province: Newfoundland and Labrador
- Census division: 5

Population (1951)
  - Total: 502
- Time zone: UTC– 3:30 (Newfoundland Time)
  - Summer (DST): UTC– 2:30 (Newfoundland Daylight)
- Area code: 709
- Bay: Bay of Islands

Woods Island is an island in the Canadian province of Newfoundland and Labrador. It contains an abandoned town with the same name.

== Geography ==
As the largest natural island in the Bay of Islands at over 2000 acres in size, Woods Island is at the heart of the Humber Arm. Lying approximately 2.5 miles from the nearest mainland at Frenchman's Cove or 3.5 miles to the town of McIvers in the Humber River Basin area. The Humber Basin area is characterized by the existence of several harbours, coves, islands and the large Humber River. The Humber River, a few miles downward from Woods Island, is the main geographic draw for its settlers. It extends approximately 150 km from Woods Island towards Deer Lake and is surrounded by the boreal forest. The Humber River is rich in salmon and can easily be paddled upward from its head.

Settlement in Woods Island is primarily centered around the harbour area of the island which is generally protected from the open ocean and the elements such as wind, rain and waves. However, there is a smaller settlement in the Innismara area of the island, and a former settlement on the south of the island at Tibbo's (Thibault's) Cove. Woods Island Harbour is characterized by a well protected anchorage for small schooners and fishing boats. A sandbar across the entrance of the harbour restricts any vessels above this size. The physical island is low in elevation, with the highest peak only reaching 200 feet above sea level and there is a slight ridge in the center of the island. Parts of the shoreline of the island are characterized by rocky cliffs of 20 to 40 feet high. Woods Island is well timbered by spruce and fir trees, with the occasional swamp found in various places around the island. The island itself is composed of ordovician shales and sandstones. A thin slice of gravel created by the ocean covers the western two-thirds of Woods Island, this is where the soil is best used for agriculture.

There are no bodies of water on Woods Island so therefore all water was obtained during occupation through surface wells typically of a depth of a couple feet to up to approximately 30 feet. These wells did not dry up other than a few instances on the Northeastern section of the island.

== History ==
Woods Island was used seasonally by European settlers at least from the 1780s and the Mi'kmaq before that.

== Demographics ==
The island was home to a peak population of 502 in 1951.

== Economy ==
The fishery, particularly the herring fishery, was the main occupation of most of the male residents of the community.

== Ethnic Origin and Religion ==
The island was home to both European and Mi'kmaq residents. The primary religion in the 20th century was Roman Catholic, with Church of England being a minority. In 1953, there was Roman Catholic Church, a Catholic Recreation Hall and a resident Catholic priest and in comparison Woods Island only had one Anglican church with no minister present.

== Culture ==
The fishery is intertwined with the culture which is a mix of Irish and Celtic influences.

== Climate ==
Woods Island experiences a typical Newfoundland climate.

== See also ==
- Bay of Islands, Newfoundland and Labrador
- Humber Arm South
- Newfoundland outport
- Resettlement (Newfoundland)
