= Newfoundland and Labrador Route 440 =

Highway in Newfoundland and Labrador, Canada

Route 440
- Admiral Palliser's Trail

Route information
- Maintained by Newfoundland and Labrador Department of Transportation and Infrastructure
- Length: 39.6 km (24.6 mi)

Major junctions
- South end: Route 1 (TCH) at Corner Brook
- North end: Main Street in Cox's Cove

Location
- Country: Canada
- Province: Newfoundland and Labrador

Highway system
- Highways in Newfoundland and Labrador
| ← Route 438 | → Route 450 |

Route 440 (also known as Admiral Palliser's Trail) is a relatively short highway in the Canadian province of Newfoundland and Labrador, on the West Coast. The highway was named in honor of Admiral Hugh Palliser. The highway starts at an interchange at Route 1 in Corner Brook, and terminates at Cox's Cove. The speed limit is 80 km/h except in communities where the speed is reduced to 50 km/h (except in Cox's Cove where the speed is reduced to 30 km/h).

There are no local roads or communities branching off Route 440, except in Cox's Cove, where the route ends to a T-intersection.

== Route description ==
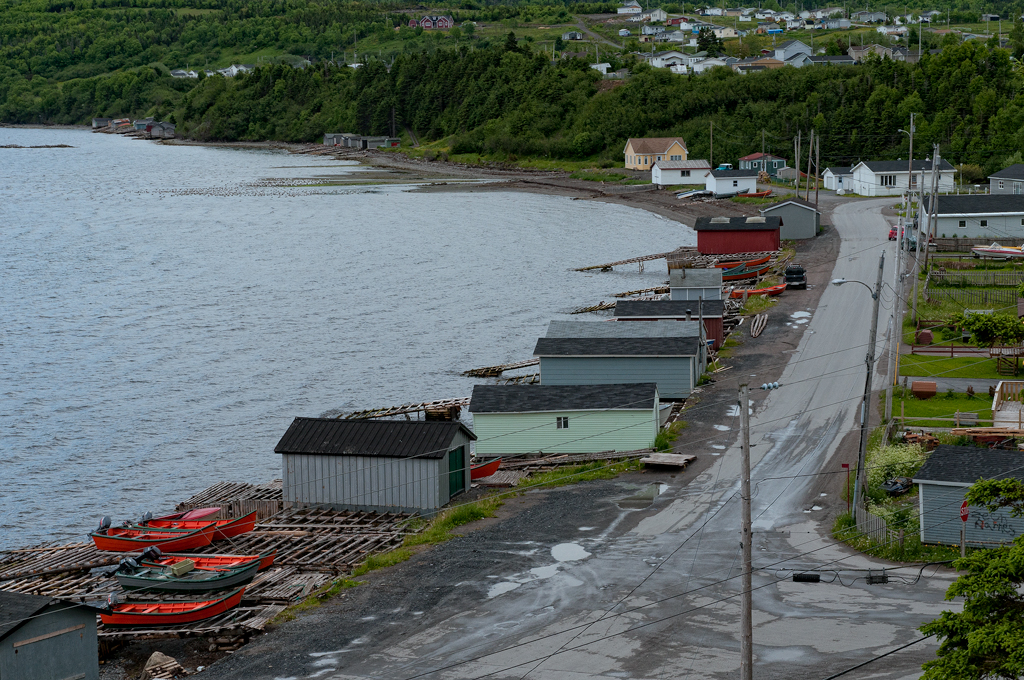
Route 440 ends at this T-intersection in Cox's Cove

Route 440 begins at the westernmost edge of Corner Brook at an interchange with Route 1 (Trans-Canada Highway, Exit 7). It heads west along the banks of the Humber River for a couple of kilometres to a small neighbourhood, where it makes a sharp right turn to cross the river at an intersection with Riverside Drive. The highway heads north past a private RV Park and a large cemetery before leaving Corner Brook and winding its way through the Long Range Mountains to pass through Hughes Brook (where it crosses the river of the same name). Route 440 now passes along the northern coastline of the Humber Arm as it passes through Irishtown-Summerside, Meadows, Gillams, and McIvers. The highway turns northeast through inland terrain for several kilometres to enter Cox's Cove, where Route 440 comes to an end along the coastline of the Bay of Islands at a Y-Intersection with Main Street.

== Major intersections ==
| Location | km | mi | Destinations | Notes |
|---|---|---|---|---|
| Corner Brook | 0.0 | 0.0 | Route 1 (TCH) – Deer Lake, Port aux Basques | Exit 7 on Route 1; southern terminus |
| Corner Brook | 1.3 | 0.81 | Riverside Drive - Downtown | |
| Cox's Cove | 39.6 | 24.6 | Main Street | Northern terminus |
1.000 mi = 1.609 km; 1.000 km = 0.621 mi
