= Atlantic Canada =

Region of Eastern Canada

Coordinates: 47°N 62°W

Atlantic Canada Provinces de l'Atlantique (French)
- Region
- Atlantic Canada (red) within the rest of Canada
- Country: Canada
- Composition: New Brunswick; Newfoundland and Labrador; Nova Scotia; Prince Edward Island
- Most populous municipality: Halifax

Area
  - Total: 539,064 km^{2} (208,134 sq mi)

Population (2021)
  - Total: 2,409,874
  - Density: 4/km^{2} (10/sq mi)

Time zones
- The Maritimes and Labrador: UTC-4:00 (AST)
- Newfoundland: UTC-3:30 (NST)

Atlantic Canada, also called the Atlantic provinces (French: provinces de l'Atlantique), is the region of Eastern Canada comprising four provinces: New Brunswick, Newfoundland and Labrador, Nova Scotia, and Prince Edward Island. As of 2021, the landmass of the four Atlantic provinces was approximately 488,000 km^{2} (188,000 sq mi), and had a population of over 2.4 million people. The term Atlantic Canada was popularized following the admission of Newfoundland as a Canadian province in 1949. The province of Newfoundland and Labrador is not included in the Maritimes, another significant regional term, but is included in Atlantic Canada.

== History ==
The Atlantic Provinces are the historical territories of the Mi'kmaq, Wolastoqiyik, Naskapi, Beothuk and Nunatsiavut peoples. The people of Nunatsiavut are the Labrador Inuit (Labradormiut), who are descended from the Thule people.

=== Exploration and settlement ===
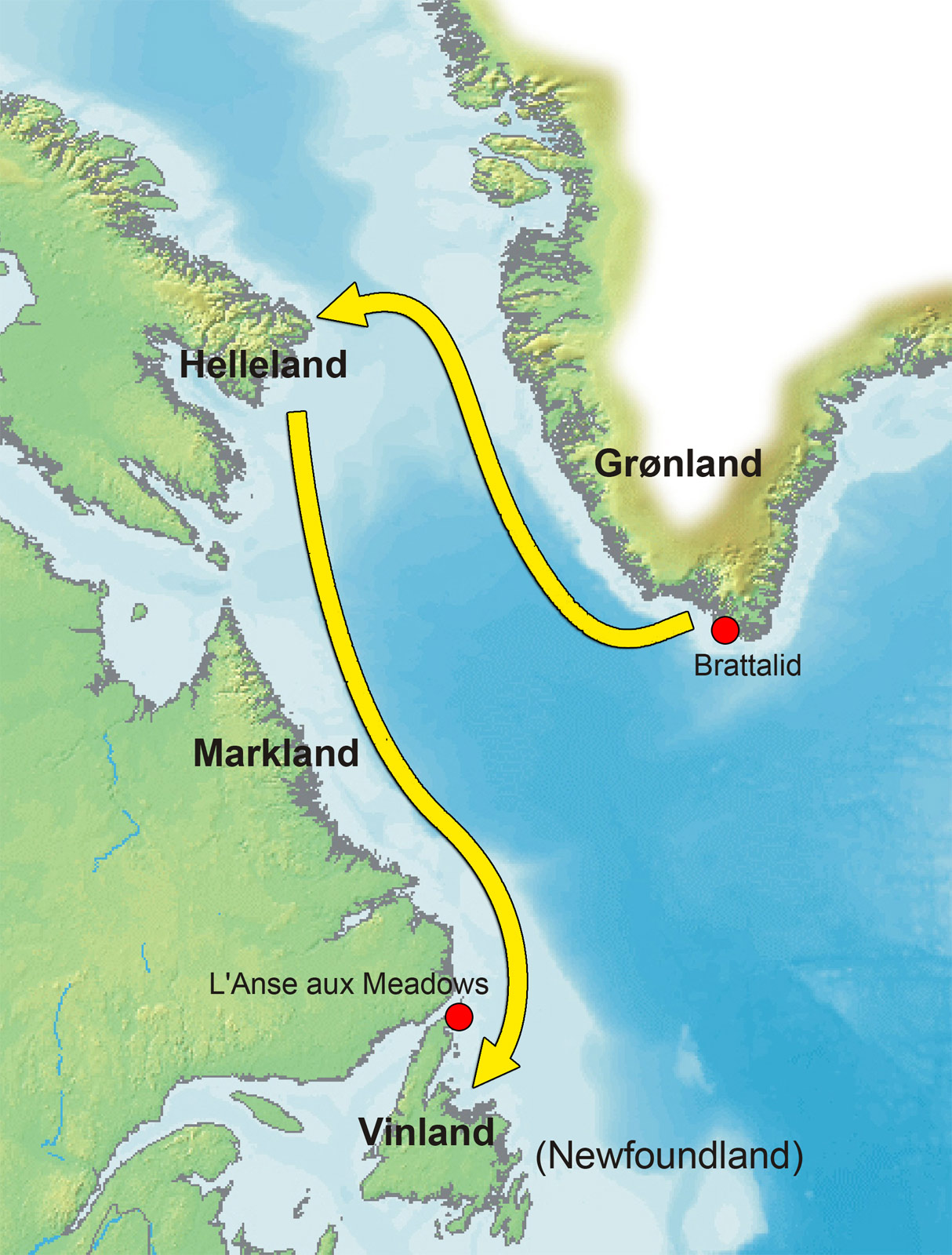
Viking migration to modern day Newfoundland

Leif Erikson and other members of his family began exploring the North American coast in 986 CE. Leif landed in three places, and in the third established a small settlement called Vinland. The location of Vinland is uncertain, but an archaeological site on the northern tip of Newfoundland at L'Anse aux Meadows has been identified as a good candidate. It was a modest Viking settlement and is the oldest confirmed presence of Europeans in North America. The Vikings would make brief excursions to North America for the next 200 years, though further attempts at colonization were thwarted. The site produced the first evidence of pre-Columbian trans-oceanic contact of Europeans with the Americas outside of Greenland.

Acadia, a colony of New France, was established in areas of present-day Atlantic Canada in 1604, under the leadership of Samuel de Champlain and Pierre Dugua, Sieur de Mons. The French would form alliances with many indigenous groups within Atlantic Canada, including the Mi'kmaq of Acadia, who joined the Wabanaki Confederacy, important allies to New France.

=== British expansion ===
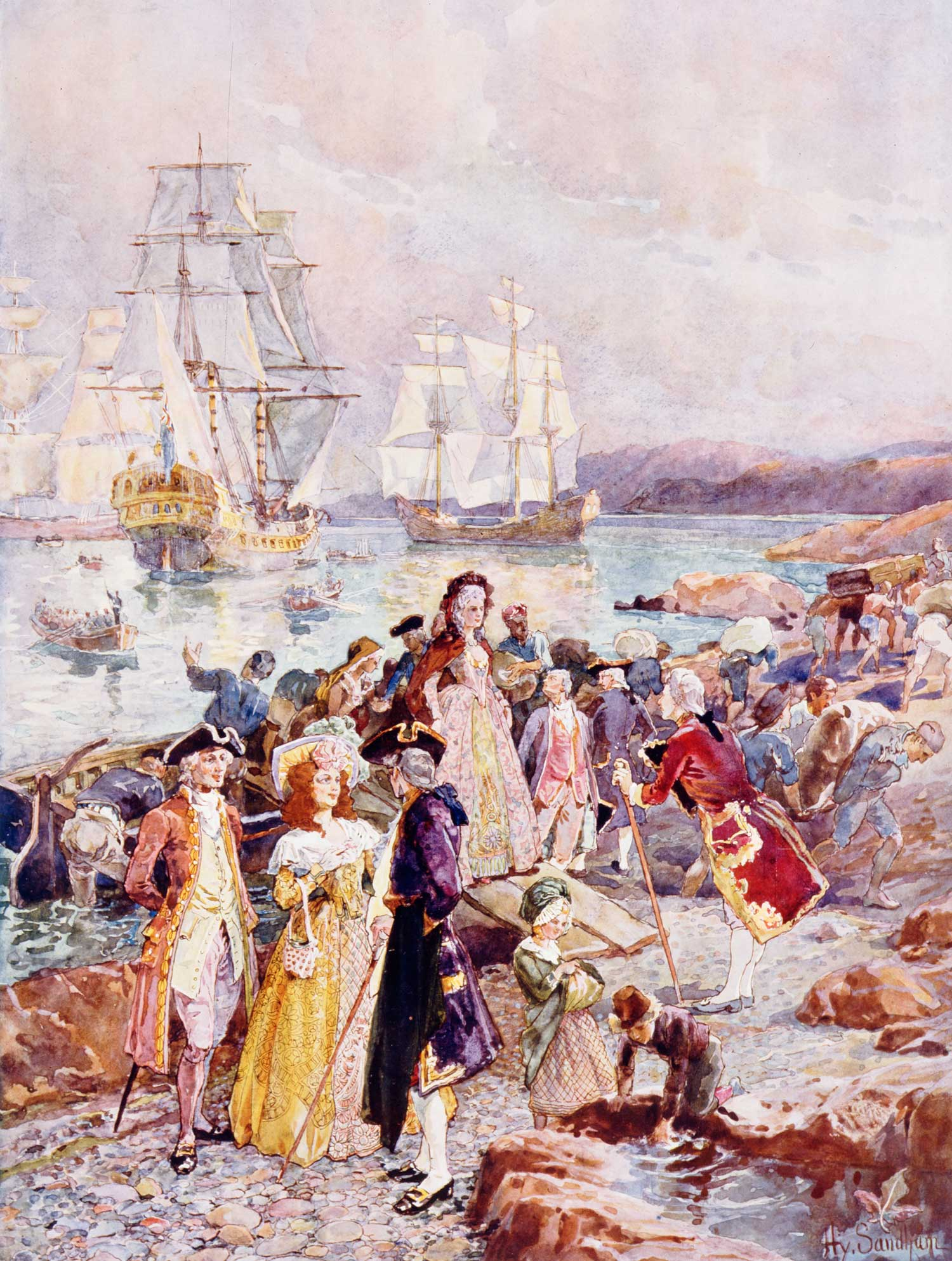
Painting shows romanticised view of United Empire Loyalists arriving in New Brunswick, ca. 1783

Competition for control of the island of Newfoundland and its waters contributed to major ongoing conflicts and occasional wars between France and Britain. The first major agreement between the two powers over access to this coastline came with the Treaty of Utrecht of 1713, giving Britain governance over the entire island and establishing the first French Shore, giving France and its migratory fishery almost exclusive access to a substantial stretch of the island's coastline.

Despite reoccurring wars and conflicts, Britain acquiesced to France's demands for continuing access to this fishery. Between 1755 and 1764 during the Seven Years' War, the British forcibly removed thousands of Acadians from Nova Scotia and New Brunswick in an event known as the Great Expulsion or Le Grand Dérangement. Following the Seven Years' War and the Treaty of Paris of 1763, Newfoundland's governor, Admiral Hugh Palliser, consolidated British control by carrying out the first systematic hydrographic charting of the island, including the Bay of Islands and Humber Arm, much of it by the Royal Naval officer James Cook.

After the signing of the Treaty of Paris in 1764, some of the Acadians returned and settled in the area that would become New Brunswick. The effect of this migration can still be seen today, as the province of New Brunswick is the only officially bilingual province in Canada, with over a quarter of residents speaking French at home.

=== Immigration: from loyalists to the Irish ===
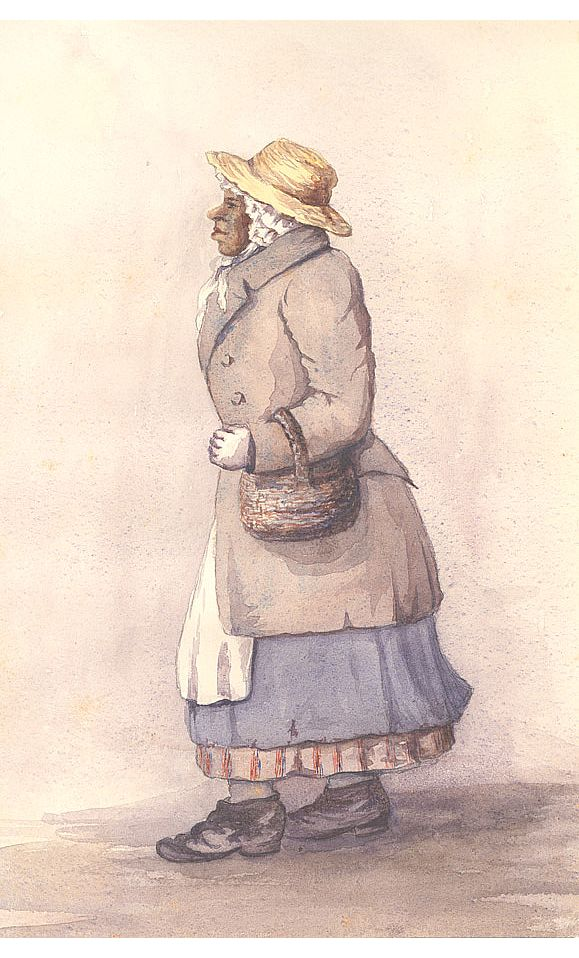
Rose Fortune, daughter of Fortune a free Negro, who immigrated to Nova Scotia as a child after the American Revolution.

After the conclusion of the American Revolution with the signing of the Treaty of Paris in 1783, many loyalists from the United States settled in the region. This influx of immigrants caused the partition of Nova Scotia, creating New Brunswick. Further, these immigrants changed the culture and character of the region, which had historically been French, towards more British styled communities. It also marked one of the first large waves of migration to the area that established a predominantly Anglo-Canadian population. Some of the new settlers brought with them Black slaves. An additional 3,000 Black loyalists and former slaves who had sided with the British were emancipated and evacuated with other Loyalists from New York to Nova Scotia. Most of the free Blacks settled at Birchtown, the most prominent Black township in North America at the time.

The War of 1812 significantly impacted the provinces of Atlantic Canada, where they played crucial roles in naval operations, privateering, and as strategic support bases for the British war effort against the United States.

In the mid-19th century, the region's population grew due to the immigration from Ireland as a result of the great potato famine. Saint John and Halifax, both port cities, particularly received a significant influx of Irish immigrants within the region, with Saint John's quarantine station on Partridge Island being the second-busiest in British North America during the epidemic typhus outbreak in 1847.

=== Creating "Atlantic Canada" ===
The first premier of Newfoundland, Joey Smallwood, coined the term "Atlantic Canada" when the Dominion of Newfoundland joined Canada in 1949. He believed that it would have been presumptuous for Newfoundland to assume that it could include itself within the existing term "Maritime provinces," which was used to describe the cultural similarities shared by New Brunswick, Prince Edward Island, and Nova Scotia. The other provinces of Atlantic Canada entered Confederation during the 19th century, with New Brunswick and Nova Scotia being founding members of the Dominion of Canada in 1867, and later Prince Edward Island in 1873.

== Geography ==
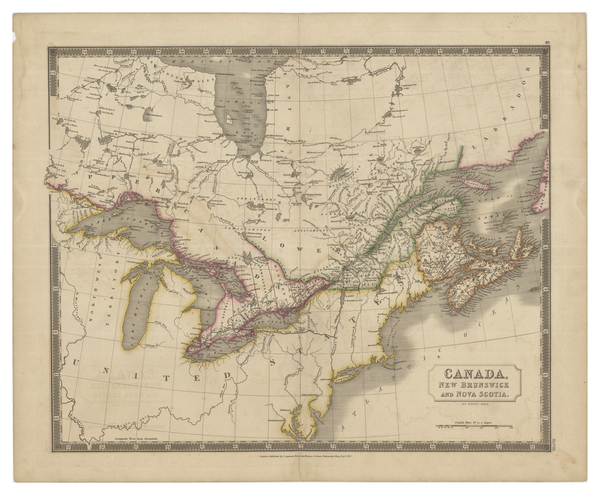
Historical map showing parts of Atlantic Canada

Atlantic Canada is characterized by its rugged coastlines, gravel beaches, rugged mountains, and dense forests.

=== Region and nearby area ===
The area is bordered by the Atlantic Ocean to the east and south and Quebec to the west. The region shares two international borders one with the United States and its State of Maine, and another off the coast of Newfoundland with France and its overseas collectivity of Saint Pierre and Miquelon. The region's maritime environment has influenced the region's climate, culture, and economy. The area encompasses a mix of urban centers, like Halifax and St. John's, and rural communities that rely on fishing and tourism.

=== Canadian dividing ===
Although Quebec has a physical Atlantic coast on the Gulf of St. Lawrence, it is generally not considered an Atlantic Province; instead, it is classified as part of Central Canada, along with Ontario.

Atlantic and Central Canada together are also known as Eastern Canada. Atlantic Canada includes a section of the Appalachian Mountains known as the Appalachian Uplands. In each Atlantic province, Upland regions have been divided into three highland areas. The mountain range results in coastal regions being fjorded. Some areas contain glaciofluvial deposits.

== Economy ==
Atlantic Canada's primary industries are natural resource extraction and power generation, including fishing, hydroelectricity, wind power, forestry, oil, and mining.

=== Fishing and the Atlantic Ocean ===
The Atlantic provinces contribute a large part of Canada's fish production, with many coastal communities primarily dependent on fisheries. Over half of all ocean-related jobs in Canada are found in Atlantic Canada, with 75% of the ocean economy centred in its provinces. The access point for many such fisheries is the Gulf of St. Lawrence and the Atlantic continental shelf. Due to the collapse of the Atlantic northwest cod fishery, Canada imposed a moratorium of cod fishing in 1992. This affected the region significantly, and caused the loss of between 30,000 and 50,000 jobs in the region, which was the largest single layoff in Canadian history. The Atlantic Canada Opportunities Agency is the official agency responsible for creating economic opportunities within Atlantic Canada.

=== Power production ===
Labrador hosts the second largest hydroelectric system in Canada at Churchill Falls, where it produces 35,000 GWh of power each year. Elsewhere in the region, wind power and hydrogen generation have begun to make a large impact on the energy landscape, including exporting energy to Canada and hydrogen overseas.

=== Resources ===
The region is host to parts of Canada's eastern boreal forests, which were historically used for timber production and boat production.

Nova Scotia has historically been an exporter of gypsum, and now produces over 60% of the gypsum in Canada. In the Atlantic provinces, iron, anhydrite, salt, coal, limestone, silica, sand, quartz, marble, slate, sandstone, granite, and peat are also mined.

== Sources ==
This article incorporates text by John Douglas Belshaw available under the CC BY-SA 4.0 license.

This article incorporates text by Rainer Baehre available under the CC BY 3.0 license.
