= Old Home Week =

American cultural practice

Old Home Week or Old Home Day is a practice that originated in the New England region of the United States similar to a harvest holiday or festival. In its beginning in the 19th–20th century it involved a municipal effort to invite former residents of a village, town, or city—usually individuals who grew up in the municipality as children and moved elsewhere in adulthood—to visit the "Old Home", the parental household and home town. Some municipalities celebrate the holiday annually, while others celebrate it every few years.

In the late 20th and early 21st century, the practice has spread to other parts of North America and has become a broader celebration with an emphasis on local culture and history. The Wilmington, Vermont town web site describes the event as follows:

Old Home Week is a town event held every 10 years. It is best described as a town reunion, a celebration of [a place's] citizens, past, present and future, and a honoring of its history. Events traditionally include a parade, a town dinner, class and family reunions and tours of local points of interest.
…[it] is a decennial celebration and gathering of friends and acquaintances, all sharing the common experience of having resided and/or attended school, in [the area]. It is also a celebration for all those who now live in and love their town. Nobody is an outsider during Old Home Week.

== See also ==
- Come Home Year
