= Indian Bay (Newfoundland and Labrador) =

Natural bay in Newfoundland and Labrador, Canada

Coordinates: 49.016°N 53.798°W

Indian Bay is a natural bay off the island of Newfoundland in the province of Newfoundland and Labrador, Canada.
