= Middle Arm, Avalon Peninsula, Newfoundland and Labrador =

Settlement in Newfoundland and Labrador, Canada

Coordinates: 47.437°N 53.202°W

Location of Middle Arm in Newfoundland and Labrador

Middle Arm is a settlement in Newfoundland and Labrador.
