= Come Home Year =

Canadian tradition

Come Home Year is a Canadian civic event for many towns that encourages a return to home town. Due to significant economic migration away from many of the small rural towns, these events draw many generations to celebrate.

In 2000, there was a provincial "Come Home Year" in Newfoundland and Labrador where many people came back to visit their various communities. 2022 was also a "Come Home Year". According to Tourism NL, “Come Home 2022 will encourage former residents of Newfoundland and Labrador now living away to come home, remind residents of the province of the wonders here in their own 'backyard,' and complement ongoing work to attract and expand marketing efforts with non-resident visitors.”

In 2017, McIvers, Newfoundland hosted a Come Home event that temporarily tripled the town's population.
