= Cox's Cove =

- Town
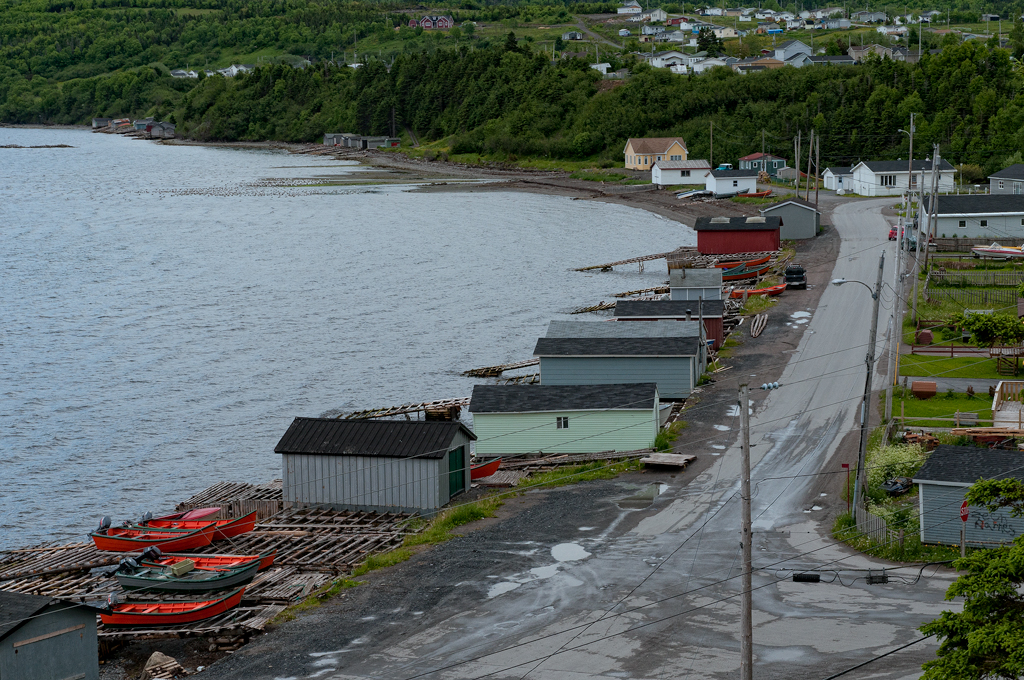
- Route 440 Y-Intersection with Main Street
- Interactive map of Cox's Cove
- Coordinates: 49.118°N 58.074°W
- Country: Canada
- Province: Newfoundland and Labrador
- Established: 1840

Government
  - Type: Town Council

Area
  - Land: 7.21 km^{2} (2.78 sq mi)

Population (2021)
  - Total: 664
  - Density: 95.4/km^{2} (247/sq mi)
- Time zone: UTC-3:30 (Newfoundland Time)
  - Summer (DST): UTC-2:30 (Newfoundland Daylight)
- Area code: 709
- Highways: Route 440

Cox's Cove is a town in the Canadian province of Newfoundland and Labrador. The town had a population of 664 in the Canada 2021 Census. The small community is mainly based on the fishery, mink farm, and construction industries.

Cox's Cove is approximately 40km northwest of Corner Brook.

== History ==
A fishing and logging community on the south side of Middle Arm in the Bay of Islands, Cox's Cove was originally settled 1840 by Thomas O'Grady and George, John and William Cox, herring and lobster fishermen. The community was also a regular port of call for the northern coastal boats. Cox's Cove was designated a reception centre in 1965 under the first Federal-Provincial Community Consolidation Programme, and from 1965 to 1970 received families from the nearby communities of Penguin Arm and Brakes Cove. Cox's Cove was incorporated in 1969, and the community had a full range of municipal services by 1980. In 1970 the Government of Newfoundland and Labrador established a new fish plant in the community. In 1979, Cox's Cove received a new water and sewerage system serving seventy per cent of the community. In 1981, the herring fishery and plant employed the majority of Cox's Cove's labour force. In the early 2000s, a mink farm began operations in the town, the farm closed in 2019.

For many years during the summer, Cox's Cove hosted the Big Hill Festival.

== Demographics ==
In the 2021 Census of Population conducted by Statistics Canada, Cox's Cove had a population of 664 living in 302 of its 335 total private dwellings, a change of −3.5% from its 2016 population of 688. With a land area of 7.23 km^{2} (2.79 sq mi), it had a population density of 91.8/km^{2} (237.9/sq mi) in 2021.

== See also ==
- List of cities and towns in Newfoundland and Labrador
