= Hughes Brook =

Town in Canada

Coordinates: 48°59′50″N 57°52′45″W

- Town
- Interactive map of Hughes Brook
- Country: Canada
- Province: Newfoundland and Labrador

Area
  - Land: 1.60 km^{2} (0.62 sq mi)

Population (2021)
  - Total: 236
  - Density: 159.5/km^{2} (413/sq mi)
- Time zone: UTC-3:30 (Newfoundland Time)
  - Summer (DST): UTC-2:30 (Newfoundland Daylight)
- Area code: 709
- Highways: Route 440

Hughes Brook is a town in the Canadian province of Newfoundland and Labrador. The town had a population of 236 in the Canada 2021 Census. It is located to the northeast of Corner Brook, in the western Bay of Islands area.

== Demographics ==
In the 2021 Census of Population conducted by Statistics Canada, Hughes Brook had a population of 236 living in 89 of its 97 total private dwellings, a change of −7.5% from its 2016 population of 255. With a land area of 1.56 km^{2} (0.60 sq mi), it had a population density of 151.3/km^{2} (391.8/sq mi) in 2021.

== See also ==
- List of cities and towns in Newfoundland and Labrador
