= Humber River (Newfoundland and Labrador) =

River in Newfoundland and Labrador

Coordinates: 48°57′30.65″N 57°53′41.26″W

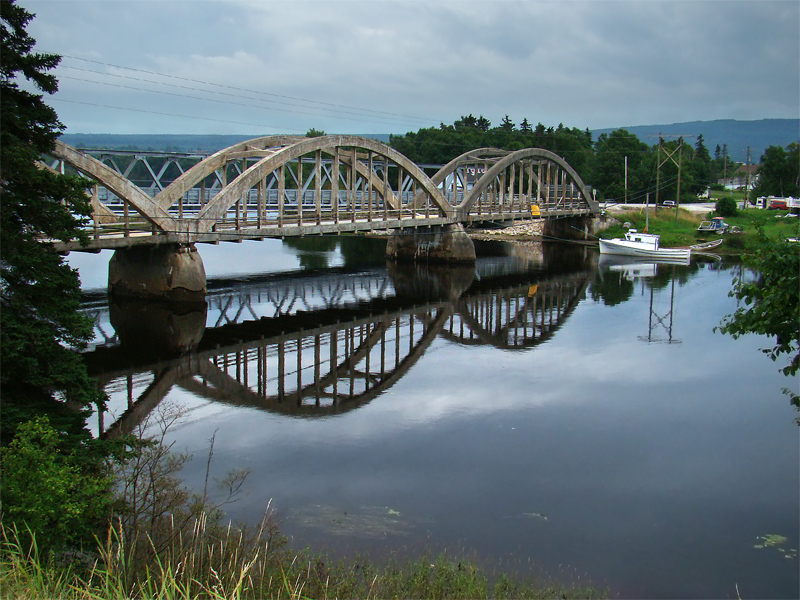
Nicholsville Bridge over the Humber

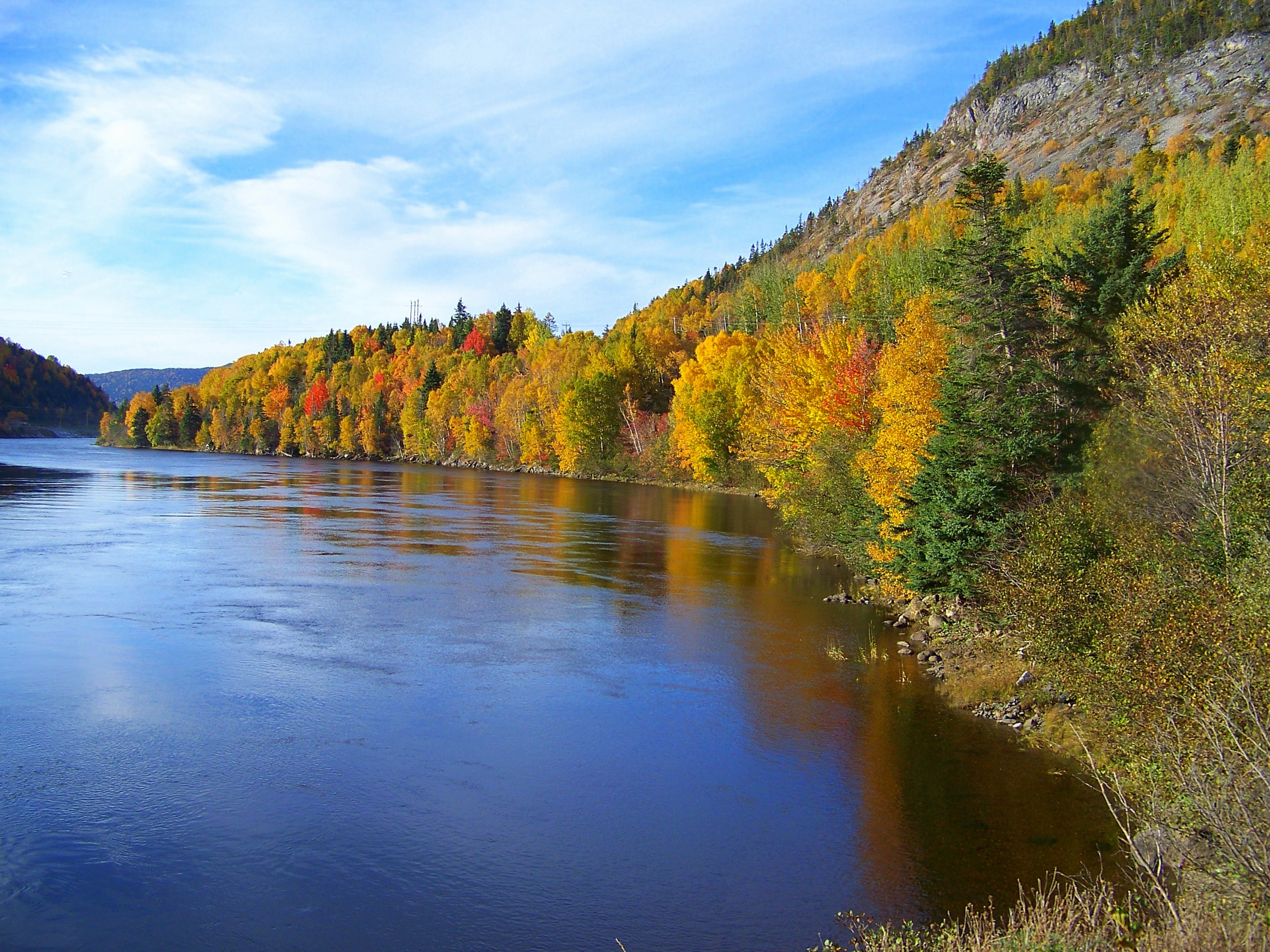
Autumn on the Humber

The Humber River is a river on Newfoundland in the Canadian province of Newfoundland and Labrador. It is approximately 120 kilometres long; it flows through the Long Range Mountains, southeast then southwest, through Deer Lake, to the Bay of Islands at Corner Brook. It begins near the town of Hampden. Taylor's Brook, Aidies Stream and Dead Water Brook run into the upper Humber. The Humber is one of Newfoundland's longest rivers.

James Cook first charted the Humber in the summer of 1767. It was named for its English counterpart the Humber (estuary).

The Humber is rich in Atlantic salmon. From the 1800s, the river was used as a waterway for European trappers and loggers. It is one of the world's best recreational salmon fishing rivers.

== See also ==
- Humber Arm
- List of rivers of Newfoundland and Labrador
