= Irishtown-Summerside =

- Town
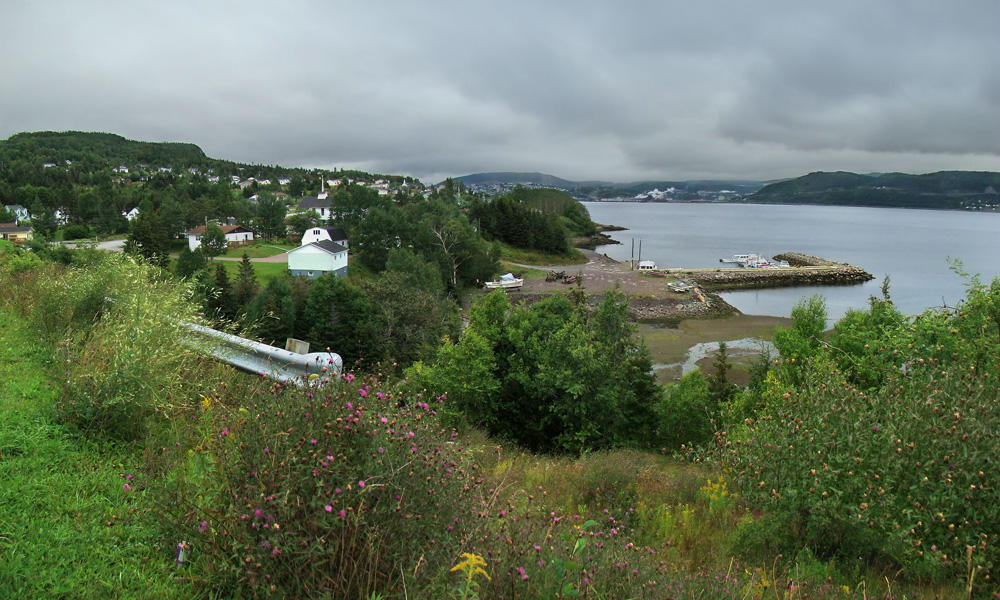
- Summerside, on the shore of the Humber Arm
- Interactive map of Irishtown-Summerside
- Coordinates: 48°59′14″N 57°57′25″W
- Country: Canada
- Province: Newfoundland and Labrador

Population (2021)
  - Total: 1,260
- Time zone: UTC-3:30 (Newfoundland Time)
  - Summer (DST): UTC-2:30 (Newfoundland Daylight)
- Area code: 709
- Highways: Route 440

Irishtown-Summerside is a town in the Canadian province of Newfoundland and Labrador. It is located about 2.5 miles (4.0 km) north of Corner Brook. The Post Office was established on March 1, 1965, and the first Postmistress was Blanch Anderson. The town had a population of 1,260 in the Canada 2021 Census.

The first permanent settlers of Irishtown-Summerside were John Loader and his family. This contiguous settlement was formerly two separate villages – one of which was known originally as Petipas (or Petipa's) Cove. Two smaller settlements (Davis (or Davis's) Cove and Christopher's Cove) were formerly both separately reported in the census.

== Demographics ==
In the 2021 Census of Population conducted by Statistics Canada, Irishtown-Summerside had a population of 1,260 living in 532 of its 583 total private dwellings. There was a change of −11.1% from its 2016 population of 1,418. With a land area of 11.88 km^{2} (4.59 sq mi), it had a population density of 106.1/km^{2} (274.7/sq mi) in 2021.

== See also ==
- List of cities and towns in Newfoundland and Labrador
