= Gillams, Newfoundland and Labrador =

Coordinates: 49.0156°N 58.0691°W

Gillams
- Town
- Interactive map of Gillams
- Country: Canada
- Province: Newfoundland and Labrador

Population (2021)
  - Total: 429
- Time zone: UTC-3:30 (Newfoundland Time)
  - Summer (DST): UTC-2:30 (Newfoundland Daylight)
- Area code: 709
- Highways: Route 440

Gillams is a town located north west of the city of Corner Brook in the Canadian province of Newfoundland and Labrador.

== Demographics ==
In the 2021 Census of Population conducted by Statistics Canada, Gillams had a population of 429 living in 213 of its 226 total private dwellings, a change of 4.6% from its 2016 population of 410. With a land area of 6.72 km^{2} (2.59 sq mi), it had a population density of 75.3/km^{2} (195.0/sq mi) in 2021.

== See also ==
- List of cities and towns in Newfoundland and Labrador
