= Humber Arm South =

Town of Humber Arm South Elmastukwek Humber Arm South
- Town
- Interactive map of Town of Humber Arm South
- Coordinates: 49°00′56″N 58°10′04″W
- Country: Canada
- Province: Newfoundland and Labrador

Government
  - Type: Town Council
  - Mayor: Erica Humber-Shears
  - MHA: Eddie Joyce (IND)
  - MP: Carol Anstey (Cons)

Population (2021)
  - Total: 1,537
- Time zone: UTC-3:30 (Newfoundland Time)
  - Summer (DST): UTC-2:30 (Newfoundland Daylight)
- Area code: 709
- Highways: Route 450

Humber Arm South is a town in the Canadian province of Newfoundland and Labrador. The town consists of the communities of Halfway Point, Benoit's Cove, John's Beach, and Frenchman's Cove. The town had a population of 1,537 in the Canada 2021 Census. The Town's Post Office is located in Benoit's Cove. Humber Arm South is located in the Bay of Islands and is in the Humber-Bay of Islands electoral district. The town's residents are of Mi'kmaq, Innu, and European descent.

== History ==
The Town of Humber Arm South consists of the descendants of the Mi'kmaq people from the area, the descendants of the immigrants from England who settled here in the early 1800s, and the people who resettled from Wood's Island. Some of those communities still exist within the incorporated municipality, which includes:

- Frenchman's Cove is subsection of the town and a formerly independent, unincorporated town. It had a population of 166 in the Canada 2006 Census. The area has been inhabited since before 1836, with the earliest known documentation about it when it appeared in the first Newfoundland Census. According to local folklore and tradition, the first settlers were named Cluetts and were of French origin. The small-boat inshore fishery was the economic mainstay of the area until the late 1800s when men went to work on the schooners operating from Grand Bank. Residents also grew turnips, cabbages, and potatoes, as well as hay for their horses, cattle, sheep, and chickens.
- Benoit's Cove: a postal and fishing outlet and a formerly independent, unincorporated town. This area of the town has been inhabited since before 1911. The Way Office was established in 1887. The first Waymaster was James Evitt. It had a population of 76 in 1911 and 295 in 1956.
- Halfway Point: a small settlement which had its first family living within it as early as 1864. Mail service closed in 1966 and it had a population of 146 in 1956.
- John's Beach: a small settlement which had one of the earliest known Anglican church and schools in the Bay of Islands. The John's Beach Anglican graveyard has some of the oldest graves in the Bay of Islands.

== Demographics ==
In the 2021 Census of Population conducted by Statistics Canada, Humber Arm South had a population of 1,537 living in 688 of its 748 total private dwellings, a change of −3.9% from its 2016 population of 1,599. With a land area of 65.14 km^{2} (25.15 sq mi), it had a population density of 23.6/km^{2} (61.1/sq mi) in 2021.

== See also ==
- List of cities and towns in Newfoundland and Labrador
- Woods Island, Newfoundland and Labrador
