= Meadows, Newfoundland and Labrador =

Meadows
- Town
- Interactive map of Meadows
- Coordinates: 48°59′48″N 58°02′43″W
- Country: Canada
- Province: Newfoundland and Labrador

Population (2021)
  - Total: 560
- Time zone: UTC-3:30 (Newfoundland Time)
  - Summer (DST): UTC-2:30 (Newfoundland Daylight)
- Postal code span: A2H 6B9
- Area code: 709
- Highways: Route 440

Meadows is a town in the Canadian province of Newfoundland and Labrador. The town had a population of 404 in the Canada 2021 Census. The town has a senior citizen's complex, a convenience store/take-out, and the North Shore's only school, Templeton Academy, a k-12 school. It also has its own water supply, and provides water for the neighbouring town of Gilliams.

== Demographics ==
In the 2021 Census of Population conducted by Statistics Canada, Meadows had a population of 560 living in 178 of its 198 total private dwellings, a change of −35.5% from its 2016 population of 626. With a land area of 3.82 km^{2} (1.47 sq mi), it had a population density of 105.8/km^{2} (273.9/sq mi) in 2021.

== See also ==
- List of cities and towns in Newfoundland and Labrador
