= Mount Moriah, Newfoundland and Labrador =

Mount Moriah
- Town
- Interactive map of Mount Moriah
- Coordinates: 48°57′30″N 58°04′15″W
- Country: Canada
- Province: Newfoundland and Labrador

Government
  - Type: Town Council
  - Mayor: Harold Payne
  - MHA: Eddie Joyce (IND)
  - MP: Carol Anstey (Cons)

Population (2021)
  - Total: 700
- Time zone: UTC-3:30 (Newfoundland Time)
  - Summer (DST): UTC-2:30 (Newfoundland Daylight)
- Area code: 709
- Highways: Route 450

Mount Moriah is a town in the Canadian province of Newfoundland and Labrador. The town had a population of 700 in the Canada 2021 Census.

== Demographics ==
In the 2021 Census of Population conducted by Statistics Canada, Mount Moriah had a population of 700 living in 285 of its 309 total private dwellings; this is a change of −6.2% from its 2016 population of 746. With a land area of 15.71 km^{2} (6.07 sq mi), it had a population density of 44.6/km^{2} (115.4/sq mi) in 2021.

== See also ==
- Bay of Islands
- List of cities and towns in Newfoundland and Labrador
