= McIvers =

- Town
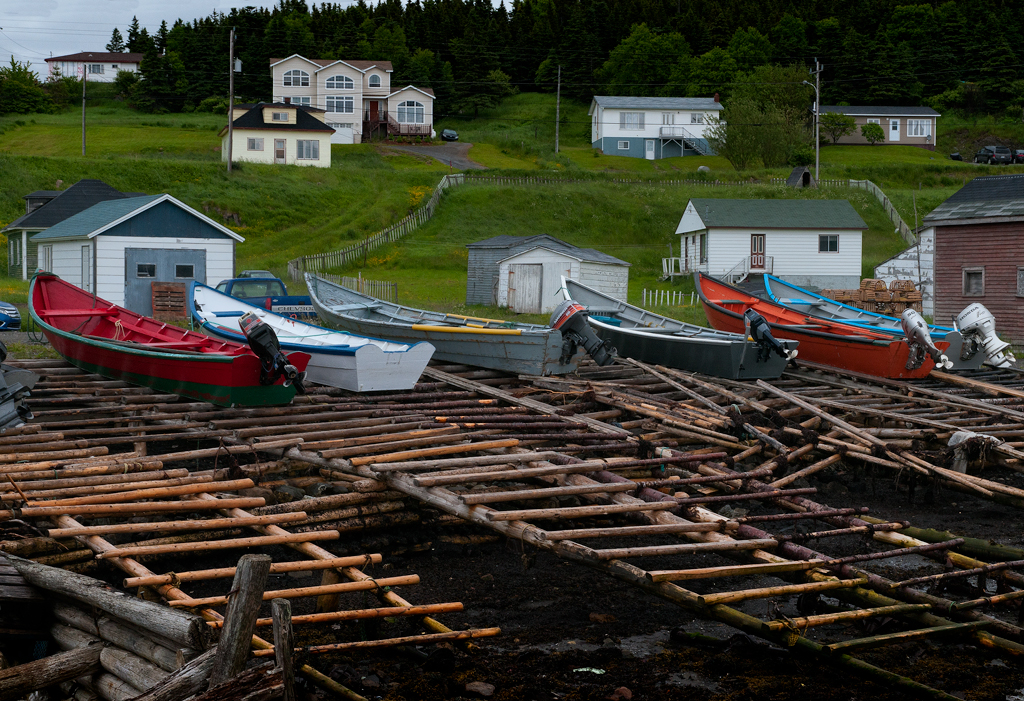
- Interactive map of McIvers
- Coordinates: 49°03′39″N 58°06′34″W
- Country: Canada
- Province: Newfoundland and Labrador

Government
  - Mayor: Susan Park
  - MHA: Eddie Joyce
  - MP: Carol Anstey

Population (2021)
  - Total: 513
- Time zone: UTC-3:30 (Newfoundland Time)
  - Summer (DST): UTC-2:30 (Newfoundland Daylight)
- Area code: 709
- Highways: Route 440

McIvers is a town in the Canadian province of Newfoundland and Labrador. The town had a population of 575 in the Canada 2021 Census. The town celebrated its Come Home Year in 2017, following a successful Chase the Ace fundraiser the previous year which largely funded the event. The town is located on the north shore of the Bay of Islands, Newfoundland and Labrador.

== Demographics ==
In the 2021 Census of Population conducted by Statistics Canada, McIvers had a population of 513 living in 240 of its 264 total private dwellings, a change of −4.6% from its 2016 population of 538. With a land area of 11.97 km^{2} (4.62 sq mi), it had a population density of 48.0/km^{2} (124.4/sq mi) in 2021.

== See also ==
- List of cities and towns in Newfoundland and Labrador
