= Bay of Islands, Newfoundland and Labrador =

Bay of Islands
- Elmastukwek (Mi'kmaq)
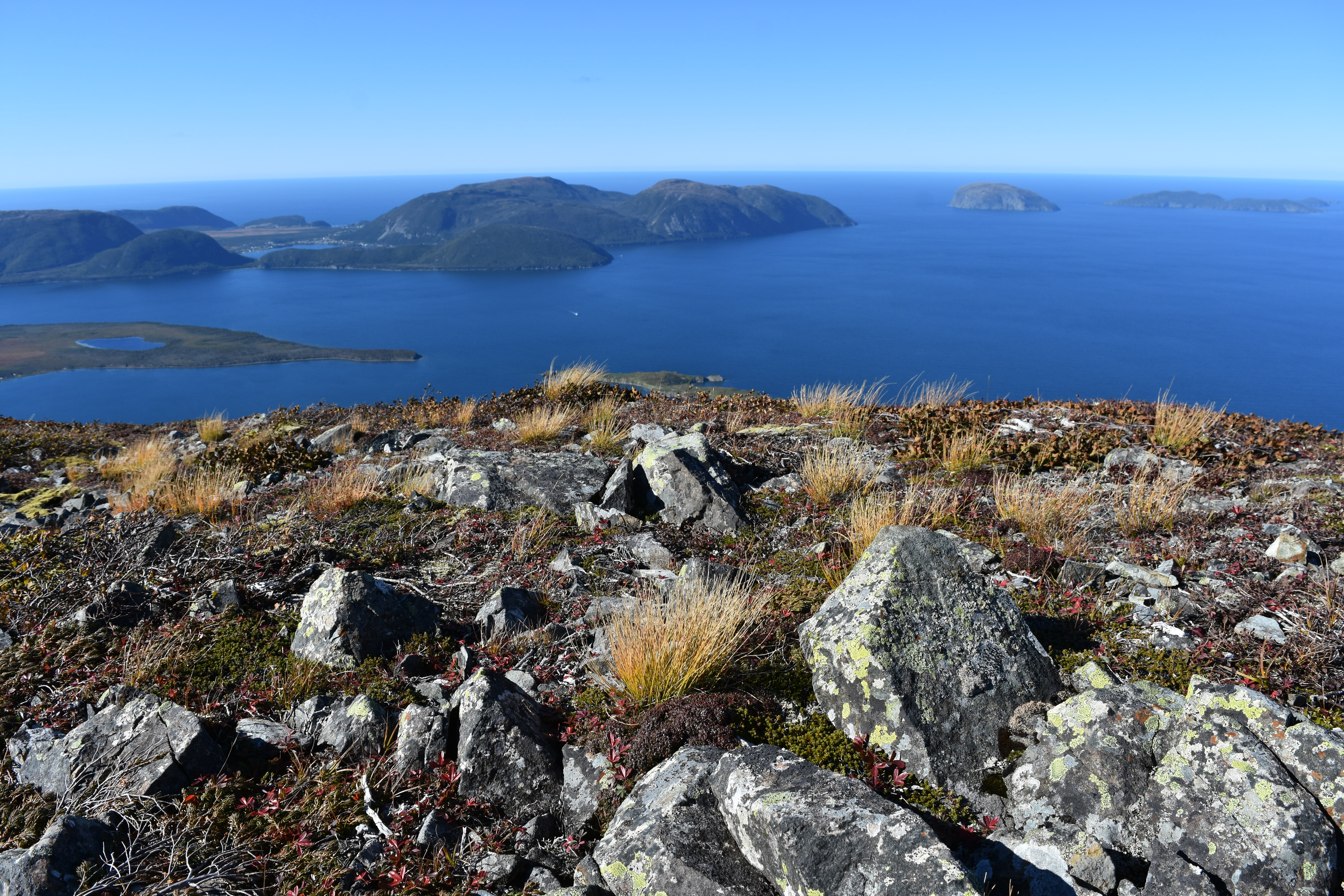
- Bay of Islands viewed from top of Blow Me Down Mountain

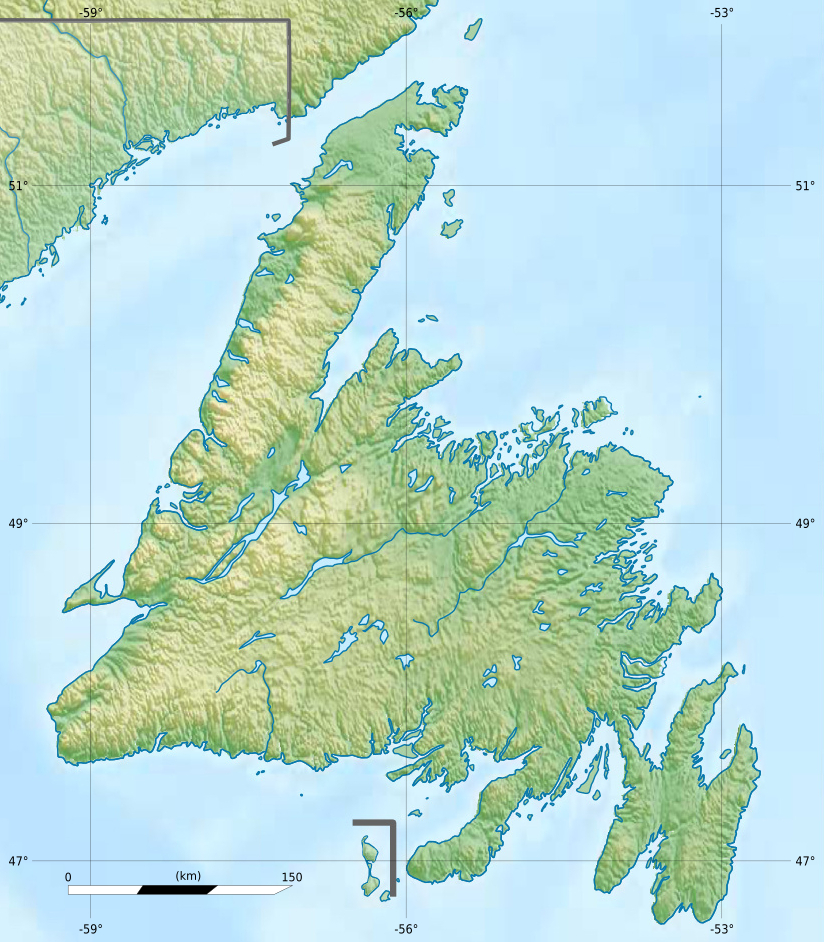
- Location of the Bay of Islands in Newfoundland

- Location: Newfoundland and Labrador
- Coordinates: 49°09′57″N 58°15′51″W
- River sources: Humber River
- Ocean/sea sources: Gulf of St. Lawrence, North Atlantic Ocean
- Basin countries: Canada
- Islands: Eagle Island, French Island, Governors Island, Green Island, Guernsey Island, Hen Island, Outer Shag Rock, Puffin Island, Seal Island, Shag Rocks, Sleep Island, The Hat, Tweed Island, Pearl Island, and Woods Island (largest)

The Bay of Islands is an extensive inlet located on the west coast of the island of Newfoundland, in Canada. It is a sub-basin of the Gulf of St. Lawrence, consisting of many inlets such as Humber Arm and Goose Arm.

The Bay of Islands is bordered on the north and south by North Arm Hills and Blow Me Down mountains, which are part of the Humber Arm Allochthon, which also include the Lewis Hills and the Tablelands. The largest island in the bay is Woods Island (which was formerly inhabited), which is surrounded in most directions by the Long Range Mountains and is directly north of the Lewis Hills.

The Way Office was established on July 1, 1883. The first Waymaster was Thomas Carter.

Flowing into the Bay of Islands is the Humber River. Draining Deer Lake, the Humber is one of the major rivers on the island of Newfoundland, making the Bay of Islands an important estuary. Near the mouth of the Humber River, appropriately named "Humber Mouth", is the city of Corner Brook (2011 pop.: 19,886), as well as several neighboring suburbs. The Humber River was used for many years to float logs down to the Bay of Islands where a large Bowater pulp and paper mill at Corner Brook turned them into paper products. Today this mill is owned by Kruger Inc and its logs are transported by truck. Although the river is mainly used for recreational purposes, the bay still sees active shipping to and from Corner Brook's port.

Other towns along the shores of the Bay of Islands are mostly dependent upon the fishing industry. On the southern shore of Humber Arm, the southernmost bay, communities include Mt Moriah, Humber Arm South, Lark Harbour, and York Harbour. On the northern shore of Humber Arm, communities include Hughes Brook, Irishtown-Summerside, Meadows, Gillams, McIvers, and (on Middle Arm, north of Humber Arm) Cox's Cove. There are still fish plants in Cox's Cove, Humber Arm South, and Curling. Curling was once an incorporated community; however, it is now amalgamated with Corner Brook.

== See also ==
- List of communities in Newfoundland and Labrador
- Woods Island, Newfoundland and Labrador
