= Newfoundland and Labrador Route 1 =

Highway in Newfoundland and Labrador, Canada

Route 1
- Route Transcanadienne
- Trans-Canada Highway
- Route 1 highlighted in red

Route information
- Maintained by Newfoundland and Labrador Department of Transportation and Infrastructure
- Length: 903 km (561 mi)

Major junctions
- West end: Route 470 / Marine Atlantic Nova Scotia ferry in Channel-Port aux Basques
- Route 480 at Barachois Pond Provincial Park; Route 430 in Deer Lake; Route 410 in Sheppardville; Route 340 in Notre Dame Junction; Route 330 in Gander; Route 230 at Thorburn Lake; Route 210 in Goobies; Route 100 in Whitbourne; Route 75 in Roaches Line; Route 2 in St. John’s
- East end: Route 30 / E White Hills Road in St. John's

Location
- Country: Canada
- Province: Newfoundland and Labrador

Highway system
- Trans-Canada Highway; Highways in Newfoundland and Labrador
← Route 520	→ Route 2

Route 1 is a highway in the Canada province of Newfoundland and Labrador, and is the easternmost stretch of the Trans-Canada Highway. Route 1 is the primary east–west road on the island of Newfoundland.

The eastern terminus of Route 1 is St. John's. From there, the highway crosses the island 903 kilometres (561 mi) to Channel-Port aux Basques, its western terminus.

From there, the Trans-Canada Highway is carried across the Cabot Strait by ferry to North Sydney, Nova Scotia.

== Route description ==
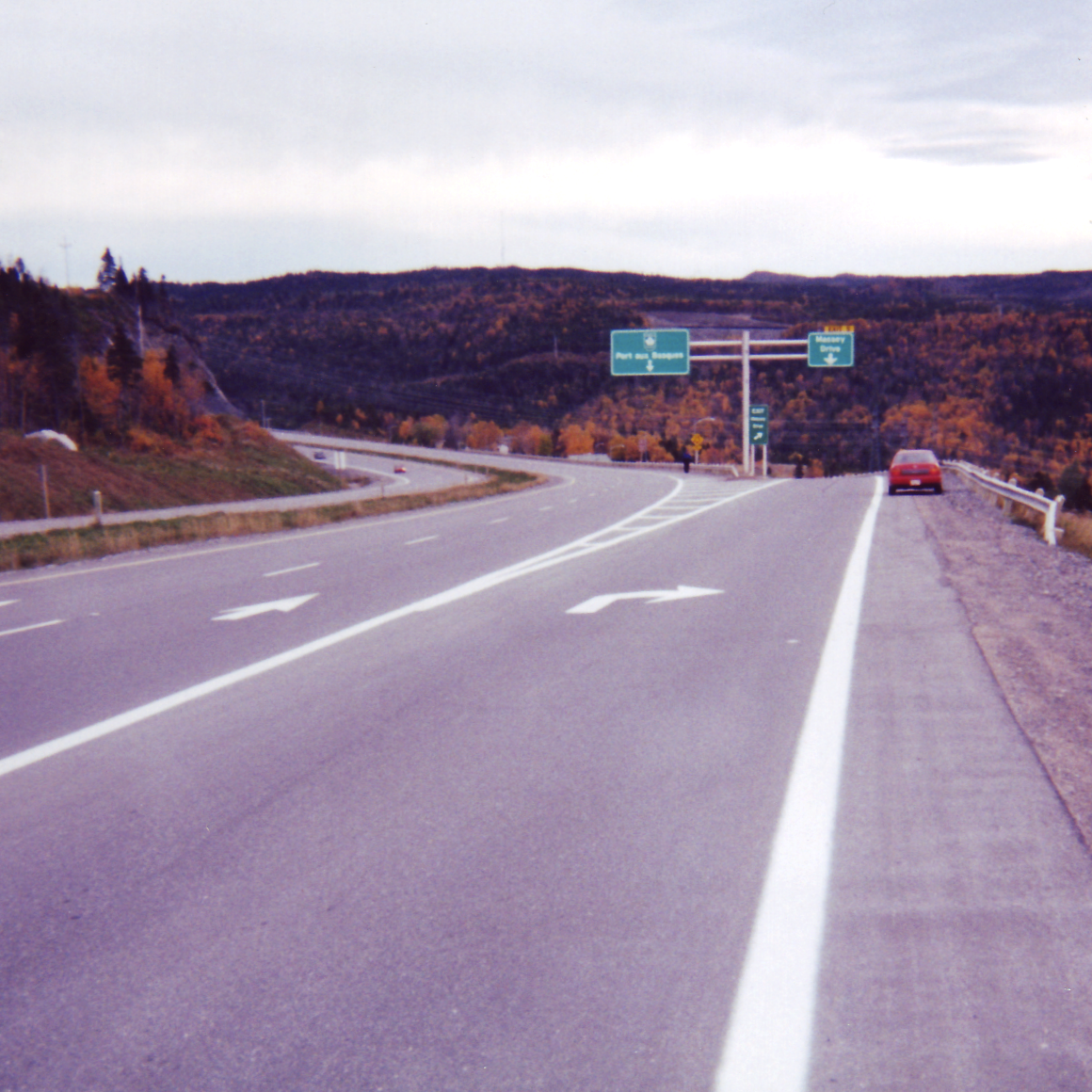
Trans Canada Highway Route 1 at Corner Brook. This is a 4-lane section at this point in the highway's 903-kilometre length.

The following description details the highway from its eastern terminus to its western terminus.

Route 1's official eastern terminus is at the interchange with Logy Bay Road in the northeastern part of St. John's, marking the eastern end of the Trans-Canada Highway. The highway begins as a freeway, proceeding west on the Outer Ring Road. Route 1 maintains the name Outer Ring Road, intersecting with St. John's roads such as Aberdeen Avenue, Torbay Road, Portugal Cove Road, Allandale Road, Team Gushue Highway, Thorburn Road, Topsail Road and Kenmount Road until the interchange with Pitts Memorial Drive, 20 km to the west.

Route 1 proceeds in a generally southwestern direction for another 25 km as it follows the southern shore of Conception Bay (several kilometres inland) until it reaches the interchange with Route 13 where it turns west and then northwest, continuing for another 29 km on a 4-lane expressway to Whitbourne where the freeway ends at the interchange with Route 80/81.

Route 1 transitions to a 2-lane, controlled access highway and continues northwest from Whitbourne along the isthmus of the Avalon Peninsula and 188 km north to Glovertown, bypassing Clarenville, small communities like Arnold's Cove, Goobies and passing through Terra Nova National Park; park admission is not required to use Route 1. The Bonavista Peninsula and Burin Peninsula can be accessed via interchanges near Clarenville and Goobies, respectively.

From Glovertown, the highway proceeds northwest 182 km to Badger, bypassing Gander, Glenwood. Lewisporte (about 11 km north on Route 340), Norris Arm Bishop's Falls and Grand Falls-Windsor; Route 1 has a 6 km 4-lane section through Grand Falls-Windsor. As of August 2008, there are no gas stations along the highway between the towns of Gander and Bishop's Falls. The Isles of Notre Dame region of the province, which includes Fogo, the Twillingate Islands, New World Island and surrounding areas, can be accessed via Route 340 at the Notre Dame Junction interchange near Lewisporte. The Bay d'Espoir region can be accessed via the Bay D'Espoir Highway near Botwood. Botwood, Point Leamington and Leading Tickles can be accessed via the Botwood Highway, officially Route 350 at an interchange in the Bishop's Falls-Grand Falls-Windsor area.

From Badger, Route 1 heads due north for 64 km to Springdale where the highway swings southwest for 137 km to Pasadena, passing through Deer Lake.

At Pasadena, the highway transitions to a 4-lane expressway and continues southwest along the south shore of Deer Lake before following the Humber River through the narrow Humber Valley. The 4-lane section proceeds for 38 km in a southwest direction, where it transitions back to a 2-lane controlled access highway west of the interchange with Route 450 (Lewin Parkway), southwest of Corner Brook.

From the Confederation Drive interchange, Route 1 proceeds for 213 km in a southwest direction, bypassing Stephenville (accessible via Route 460 and Route 490) and passing through the Codroy Valley (where it is a 2-lane uncontrolled access highway) to Port aux Basques. It terminates southeast of the town at the Marine Atlantic ferry terminal, where travelers can continue to Nova Scotia, New Brunswick, Quebec, and the rest of Canada.

== Outer Ring Road ==
New highway construction during the 1990s extended Route 1 on what is called the Outer Ring Road to the interchange with Logy Bay Road in the northeast part of St. John's, including passing by the Stavanger Drive Shopping Area. The bypass opened in phases moving increasingly eastward from Kenmount Road to Logy Bay Road, between 1998 and 2003. Prior to this construction, Route 1 and the Trans-Canada Highway designation began at St. John's City Hall on New Gower Street and proceeded west on Pitts Memorial Drive and then on the current alignment of Route 1 to the southwest. It is for this reason that the city named its hockey arena and convention centre Mile One Centre, adjacent to the city hall.

To follow an unofficial alignment of Route 1 from St. John's City Hall, one must head geographically east for 1.5 km into the southeastern part of the city, continuing onto Duckworth Street (Route 60). Proceed north for 1 km on Cavendish Square and King's Bridge Road before turning east for 1.5 km along the north shore of Quidi Vidi Lake on The Boulevard, Or Turn Right Onto Forest Road And Continue To Quidi Vidi Village Road. At The Turnoff To Barrows Road, Keep Left.

Continue north on East White Hills Road, which becomes controlled access several hundred metres north of its intersection with The Boulevard. The East White Hills Road transitions into the Outer Ring Road 4 km to the north at the interchange with the Logy Bay Road.

== Exit list ==
Location	km	mi	Exit	Destinations	Notes
Cabot Strait	893	555	-	Hwy 105 (TCH) west – Canso Causeway	Continuation into Nova Scotia
Cabot Strait	893	555	Marine Atlantic ferry to North Sydney		
Channel-Port aux Basques	893	555	Channel-Port aux Basques ferry terminal		
Channel-Port aux Basques	892	554	(1)	Route 470 – Isle aux Morts	Provides access to La Poile-Rose Blanche ferry
Channel-Port aux Basques	890	550	-	High Street	Unnumbered Exit, To Downtown Port Aux Basques.
Channel-Port aux Basques	888	552	-	Grand Bay West	At-grade intersection
	886	551	-	Edna's Road - Long Grade	At-grade intersection
	883	549	-	J.T. Cheeseman Provincial Park main entrance	At-grade intersection; access road into park
	877	545	-	Route 408 – Cape Ray	At-grade intersection
Tompkins	868	539	-	Route 407 – Tompkins, St. Andrew's	At-grade intersection
Doyles	866	538	-	Route 406 – Upper Ferry, Codroy	At-grade intersection
South Branch	849	528	-	South Branch	At-grade intersection
South Branch	846	526	-	South Branch	At-grade intersection
	810	500	-	Route 405 – St. David's, Highlands	At-grade intersection
	809	503	-	Crabbes River Park main entrance	At-grade intersection; access road into park
	806	501	-	Route 404 – Jeffrey's, McKay's	At-grade intersection
Robinsons	800	500	-	Route 404 – Robinsons, Heatherton	At-grade intersection
	773	480	-	Route 403 – Flat Bay, St. Teresa	At-grade intersection
	769	478	-	Route 461 – St. George's, Barachois Brook	At-grade intersection
Barachois Brook	763	474	2	Route 490 – Stephenville, Stephenville Crossing	Katarina Roxon Way, Alternate Route To Port Aux Port Peninsula
Barachois Pond Provincial Park	755	469	-	Barachois Pond Provincial Park main entrance	At-grade intersection; access road into park
Barachois Pond Provincial Park	752	467	-	Route 480 (Burgeo Highway) – Burgeo	At-grade intersection; Beware Of Potholes;provides access to Ramea ferry
Harry's Brook	740	460	3	Route 460 (White's Road, Hansen Highway) – Stephenville, Port au Port Peninsula	
	730	450	-	Route 402 – Gallants	At-grade intersection
Corner Brook	696	432	4	Route 450 (Lewin Parkway)	Access To Lark Harbour
Corner Brook	692	430	5	Massey Drive	
Corner Brook	690	430	6	Route 450A (Lewin Parkway)	
Corner Brook	687	427	7	Route 440 (Riverside Drive) – Cox's Cove	Admiral Palliser's Trail
Steady Brook	683	424	8	Marble Drive	Marble Mountain
Humber Village	676	420	9	Marble Drive	
Little Rapids	673	418	10	Strawberry Loop, Strawberry Lane	
Little Rapids	671	417	11	Bonnell Drive, Boom Siding Road	
Pasadena	666	414	12	Main Street, Boom Siding Road	
Pasadena	661	411	13	Stentaford Avenue	
St. Jude's	643	400	14	Ridgeview Road	
Deer Lake	640	400	15A	Glide Lake Road	
Deer Lake	638	396	15	High Street	
Deer Lake	637	396	16	Route 430 – Port au Choix, St. Anthony	Viking Trail; Ferry connection to Blanc-Sablon, QC (and Labrador) and Route 510
Deer Lake	636	395	-	Airport road - Deer Lake Regional Airport	At-grade intersection; access road into airport
	609	378	-	Route 401 – Howley	At-grade intersection
Sandy Lake	594	369	-	Route 420 – Hampden, Jackson's Arm	At-grade intersection
Sheppardville	543	337	-	Route 410 – Baie Verte, La Scie	At-grade intersection; Dorset Trail, Also Serves Westport And Fleur de Lys
Sheppardville	542	337	-	Sheppardville	At-grade intersection
	523	325	-	Route 390 – Springdale, King's Point	At-grade intersection
	522	324	-	Springdale Airport main entrance	At-grade intersection; access road into airport
South Brook	511	318	-	Route 380 – Roberts Arm, Triton	At-grade intersection; provides access to Long Island ferry; Beothuck Trail
	468	291	-	Catamaran Park main entrance	At-grade intersection; access road into park
Badger	459	285	-	Route 370 – Millertown, Buchans	At-grade intersection; Buchans Highway, Provides Access To Mid-Island Route
	440	270	-	Red Cliff	Now closed at-grade intersection
	437	272	-	Red Cliff	At-grade intersection
Grand Falls-Windsor	432	268	17	Main Street	
Grand Falls-Windsor	431	268	-	Duggan Street	Unnumbered Exit; westbound exit and entrance only
Grand Falls-Windsor	431	268	18 A/B	Cromer Avenue	
Grand Falls-Windsor	430	270	19	Union Street	
Grand Falls-Windsor	428	266	20	Scott Avenue	
Bishops Falls	421	262	21	Main Street - Bishops Falls	
Bishops Falls	413	257	22	Route 350 – Bishops Falls, Botwood	Serves Leading Tickles And Fortune Harbour
Bishops Falls	412	256	-	Route 360 – St. Alban's, Harbour Breton	At-grade intersection; Bay d'Espoir Highway. Beware Of Potholes
Norris Arm	400	250	-	Route 351 – Norris Arm	At-grade intersection
Norris Arm	390	240	-	Route 351 – Norris Arm	At-grade intersection
	388	241	-	Norris Arm North Side	At-grade intersection
Notre Dame Junction	382	237	23	Route 340 – Lewisporte, Twillingate	Road to the Isles; Also Serves Little Burnt Bay; provides access to Fogo Island and Change Islands ferries
Notre Dame Junction	381	237	-	Notre Dame Provincial Park main entrance	At-grade intersection; access road into park
Glenwood	361	224	-	Forest Resource Road - Salmon Pond, Lumber Yard	Unnumbered Exit
Glenwood	360	220	-	Spruce Avenue	At-grade intersection
Glenwood	359	223	-	Main Street / River Drive	At-grade intersection
Appleton	359	223	-	River Road / Richards Road	At-grade intersection
Appleton	358	222	-	Bowater Road / Simms Road	At-grade intersection
Gander	340	210	-	Magee Road - Gander	At-grade intersection
Gander	338	210	-	Caldwell Street - Gander	At-grade intersection
Gander	338	210	-	Cobhan Street - Gander	At-grade intersection
Gander	337	209	-	Route 330 – Gander, Carmanville, Musgrave Harbour	At-grade intersection; Road to the shore; provides access to Gander International Airport and Canadian Forces Base Gander, Alternate Route To Lewisporte, Little Burnt Bay, And Twillingate
Benton	321	199	-	Benton	At-grade intersection
Gambo	297	185	24	Route 320 – Gambo, New-Wes-Valley	Road to the Shore, Route To New-Wes-Valley, Brookfield, Wesleyville
Glovertown	280	170	25	Route 310 – Glovertown	Road to the Beaches, Alternate Route To Eastport Peninsula
Terra Nova National Park	271	168	-	To Route 310 – Terra Nova National Park	At-grade intersection
Terra Nova National Park	255	158	-	Route 301 (Terra Nova Road) – Terra Nova	At-grade intersection
Terra Nova National Park	247	153	-	Charlottetown	At-grade intersection
Port Blandford	227	141	-	Main Street - Port Blandford	At-grade intersection, To Downtown Port Blandford
Port Blandford	224	139	-	Blackmore’s Road - Port Blandford	At-grade intersection
Port Blandford	223	139	-	Route 233 – Port Blandford, Musgravetown	At-grade intersection, Also Serves Bunyan’s Cove, Bloomfield, Lethbridge And Brooklyn
George's Brook	207	129	26	Route 230 – Catalina, Trinity, Bonavista	Discovery Trail, Also Serves George’s Brook, Burgoyne’s Cove, Lethbridge, And Brooklyn. Access To Route 235.
Clarenville	195	121	-	Route 230A (Manitoba Drive) – Clarenville, George's Brook	At-grade intersection, Serves Shoal Harbour, Downtown Clarenville, Milton, Bourgoyne’s Cove, Georges Brook, Random Island.
Deep Bight	186	116	-	Deep Bight, Adeytown	At-grade intersection
Adeytown	181	112	-	Adeytown, Deep Bight	At-grade intersection
Hillview	178	111	-	Route 205 – Hillview, St. Jones Within	At-grade intersection
Ivany's Cove	175	109	-	Ivany's Cove, North West Brook	At-grade intersection
North West Brook	172	107	-	Route 204 – Hodge's Cove, Little Heart's Ease	At-grade intersection, Also Serves Gooseberry Cove And Southport
Goobies	165	103	-	Route 210 – Goobies, Marystown, Grand Bank	At-grade intersection; provides access to Saint Pierre and Miquelon ferry
Come By Chance	154	96	26B	Main Road - Come By Chance, Sunnyside	
Arnold's Cove	146	91	26A	Refinery Road - Arnold's Cove	
	139	86	-	Southern Harbour	At-grade intersection
	126	78	-	Route 201 – Chance Cove, Bellevue	At-grade intersection; Osprey Trail, Also Serves Bellevue Beach
Bellevue Beach	119	74	-	Route 203 to Route 201 – Bellevue, Fair Haven	At-grade intersection, Beware Of Potholes On Route 203.
Chapel Arm	104	65	27	Route 201 / Route 202 – Long Harbour, Norman's Cove-Long Cove	Osprey Trail (Route 201)
Whitbourne	92	57	-	Route 100 – Placentia, St. Bride's, Argentia	At-grade intersection; provides access to Marine Atlantic Ferry at Argentia
Whitbourne	90	56	28	Route 80 (Trinity Road) / Route 81 (Markland Road) – Whitbourne, New Harbour	Baccalieu Trail (Route 80)
Ocean Pond	81	50	29	Ocean Pond Road	
Grand Pond	77	48	30	Route 71 (Hodgewater Line) – Makinsons	
Roaches Line	72	45	31	Route 75 (Veterans Memorial Highway) to Route 70 – Bay Roberts, Carbonear	Baccalieu Trail, Serves Brigus, Cupids, South River, Clarke’s Beach, North River, Bay Roberts, Port De Grave, Spaniard’s Bay, Tilton, Harbour Grace, Carbonear, Bristol’s Hope
Brigus Junction	70	43	32	Brigus Junction Road - Brigus Junction	
Middle Gull Pond	66	41	33	Middle Gull Pond Road	
Avondale	64	40	34	Route 63 (Avondale Access Road) – Avondale, Harbour Main	Also Serves Conception Harbour, Bacon Cove, Kitchuses, Colliers, Marysvale, Georgetown, Brigus, Cupids
Holyrood	60	37	35	Route 90 (Salmonier Line) – Holyrood, St. Mary's	Western portion of Irish Loop Drive, Also Serves St. Catherines
Holyrood	51	32	36	Route 62 (Holyrood Access Road) – Downtown Holyrood, CBS	Liam Hickey Drive. Serves Downtown Holyrood
Butter Pot	48	30	37	Route 13 (Witless Bay Line) – Bay Bulls	Recently Resurfaced
Butter Pot	43	27	38	Butter Pot Provincial Park	
Conception Bay South	33	21	39	Route 61 (Foxtrap Access Road) – Foxtrap, Peachytown, Codner, Greeleytown	
St. John's	25	16	40	Paddy's Pond/Cochrane Pond	
St. John's	21	13	41	Danny Drive - Galway	Access to Galway Business Centre
	19	12	41 A/B	Route 2 (Pitts Memorial Drive/Peacekeepers Way) – Conception Bay South, Mount Pearl, Downtown, Goulds, Kilbride, Southlands	Outer Ring Road
Mount Pearl	17	11	42 A/B	Kenmount Road - Mount Pearl	Outer Ring Road, Access To McNamara And Donovans Industrial Parks
Paradise	16	9.9	43	Route 60 (Topsail Road) – Paradise, Mount Pearl, St. John’s	Outer Ring Road
St. John's	11	6.8	44	Route 50 (Thorburn Road) – St. Philip's, Kelsey Drive, Avalon Mall	Outer Ring Road
St. John's	9	5.6	45	Route 3A (Team Gushue Highway)	Outer Ring Road
St. John's	6	3.7	46	Allandale Road - Confederation Building, Pippy Park	Outer Ring Road
St. John's	4	2.5	47 A/B	Route 40 (Portugal Cove Road) – Downtown St. John’s, Portugal Cove	Outer Ring Road. Provides access to St. John's International Airport and the Bell Island Ferry
St. John's	3	1.9	48 A/B	Route 20 (Torbay Road) – Torbay, Middle Cove, Flatrock, Bauline, Pouch Cove	Outer Ring Road. No access from Route 20 to Route 1 eastbound
St. John's	2	1.2	49	Aberdeen Avenue, Stavanger Drive	Outer Ring Road
St. John's	0	0.0	50	Route 30 (Logy Bay Road)	Outer Ring Road. Eastern terminus; eastbound exit and westbound entrance; road continues east as E White Hills Road
1.000 mi = 1.609 km; 1.000 km = 0.621 mi: Closed/former; Incomplete access; Tolled

Trans-Canada Highway
Previous route NS Highway 105	Route 1	Next route Terminus
