= Newfoundland and Labrador Route 204 =

Highway in Newfoundland and Labrador, Canada

Route 204
- Southwest Arm Road

Route information
- Maintained by Newfoundland and Labrador Department of Transportation and Infrastructure
- Length: 30.5 km (19.0 mi)

Major junctions
- West end: Route 1 (TCH) in North West Brook
- East end: Southport

Location
- Country: Canada
- Province: Newfoundland and Labrador

Highway system
- Highways in Newfoundland and Labrador
← Route 203	→ Route 205

Route 204, also known as Southwest Arm Road, is a 30.5-kilometre-long (19.0 mi) east–west highway on the island of Newfoundland in the province of Newfoundland and Labrador. It connects the communities along the southern shore of the Southwest Arm of Trinity Bay with the Trans-Canada Highway (Route 1) at North West Brook. It is a very curvy two-lane highway traversing very hilly terrain for its entire length.

== Route description ==
Route 204 begins at an intersection with Route 1 (Trans-Canada Highway) in North West Brook and it heads north to pass through downtown and have an intersection with Harbour Drive, which provides access to Ivany's Cove. The highway now curves to the east and begins winding its way along the southern shore of Southwest Arm, with the road passing through the communities of Queen's Cove, Long Beach, Hodge's Cove, Caplin Cove, Little Heart's Ease, and Butter Cove, where it has two intersections with a local road that loops through Gooseberry Cove. Route 204 now makes a sharp left turn and heads northward for a few kilometres before entering Southport and coming to a dead end in a neighbourhood just past the town's harbour.

== Major intersections ==
Location	km	mi	Destinations	Notes
North West Brook	0.0	0.0	Route 1 (TCH) – Clarenville, St. John's	Western terminus
North West Brook	1.5	0.93	Harbour Drive - Ivany's Cove	
Butter Cove	28.3	17.6	Gooseberry Cove Road - Gooseberry Cove	
	29.3	18.2	Gooseberry Cove Road - Gooseberry Cove	
Southport	30.5	19.0	Dead End	Eastern terminus
1.000 mi = 1.609 km; 1.000 km = 0.621 mi
