= Caplin Cove-Southport, Newfoundland and Labrador =

Designated place in Newfoundland and Labrador

Caplin Cove-Southport
- Local service district / designated place
- Location within Newfoundland and Labrador Location within Canada
- Coordinates: 48.013°N 53.686°W
- Country: Canada
- Province: Newfoundland and Labrador
- Census division: 7
- Census subdivision: M

Area
  - Land: 26.46 km^{2} (10.22 sq mi)

Population (2016)
  - Total: 687
- Time zone: UTC−03:30 (NST)
  - Summer (DST): UTC−02:30 (NDT)
- Highways: Route 204

Caplin Cove-Southport is a local service district and designated place in Trinity Bay in the Canadian province of Newfoundland and Labrador. Caplin Cove-Southport is approximately 50 km from Clarenville.

== History ==
Caplin Cove-Southport was created as a local service district and designated place in 2004, consisting of five communities (Butter Cove, Caplin Cove, Gooseberry Cove, Little Heart's Ease and Southport). In 2012, the community of Long Beach was annexed by the district.

== Geography ==
Caplin Cove-Southport is in Newfoundland within Subdivision M of Division No. 7. The community of Long Beach is west of Hodge's Cove, while the five others are east of it. All communities are located on Newfoundland and Labrador Route 204.

== Demographics ==
As a designated place in the 2016 Census of Population conducted by Statistics Canada, Caplin Cove-Southport recorded a population of 687 living in 316 of its 406 total private dwellings, a change of −12.6% from its 2011 population of 786. With a land area of 26.46 km^{2} (10.22 sq mi), it had a population density of 26.0/km^{2} (67.2/sq mi) in 2016.

== Government ==
Caplin Cove-Southport is a local service district (LSD) that is governed by a committee responsible for the provision of certain services to the community. The chair of the LSD committee is Valerie Johnson.

== See also ==
- Cod fisheries
- Newfoundland outport
- List of designated places in Newfoundland and Labrador
- List of local service districts in Newfoundland and Labrador
- Trinity Bay (Newfoundland and Labrador)
