= Loreburn, Newfoundland and Labrador =

Coordinates: 48.046°N 53.714°W

Location of Loreburn in Newfoundland and Labrador

Loreburn, named Long Cove until 1912, is a resettled community located on the north shore of Southwest Arm on the island of Newfoundland in Newfoundland and Labrador, Canada. The community was first settled by Benjamin and Maria (Banton) Price and their family of Hant's Harbour, Trinity Bay. Before the Prices arrived, Loreburn was also used by the Dean family of Southport as a winter tilting location. According to the 1935 census the population of Loreburn was 46 in ten families. In 1945 the population peaked at 49 in ten families. Loreburn's economy was primarily based around the inshore fishery and Caleb Meadus and his sons, Herbert and Calvert, were among the first fishermen in the province to experiment with the introduction of nylon gill nets (c. 1962). The only religious denomination at Loreburn was Methodist/United Church. They constructed their first church circa 1916–1920. In 1989 the pulpit from the church was re-erected in the United Church at Green's Harbour, Trinity Bay. By 1966 the population of Loreburn began to decline and there were only eight students enrolled at the school. With the declining population and the topography of the area making it difficult to construct a road from St. Jones Within to Loreburn, the remaining seven families of Prices, Meadus and Flights petitioned the provincial government to grant them resettlement status. In 1967 five families moved to St. Jones Within and two families moved to Little Heart's Ease.
