= Newfoundland and Labrador Route 205 =

Highway in Newfoundland and Labrador

Route 205
- Hatchet Cove Road

Route information
- Maintained by Newfoundland and Labrador Department of Transportation and Infrastructure
- Length: 17.2 km (10.7 mi)

Major junctions
- West end: Route 1 (TCH) at Hillview
- East end: St. Jones Within

Location
- Country: Canada
- Province: Newfoundland and Labrador

Highway system
- Highways in Newfoundland and Labrador
← Route 204	→ Route 210

Route 205, also known as Hatchet Cove Road, is a relatively short east-west highway on the island of Newfoundland in the Canadian province of Newfoundland and Labrador. It connects the communities along the northern shore of the Southwest Arm of Trinity Bay with Route 1. It is the last provincial route heading west along the Trans-Canada Highway (Route 1) before approaching the Town of Clarenville.

== Route description ==
Route 205 begins in Hillview at an intersection with Route 1 (TCH). It winds its way eastward through the community before leaving Hillview and passing through rural wooded terrain for several kilometres. The highway now passes through Hatchet Cove before heading through hilly areas to enter St. Jones Within, where it comes to a dead end after passing through town along Northside Road.

== Major intersections ==
Location	km	mi	Destinations	Notes
Hillview	0.0	0.0	Route 1 (TCH) – Clarenville, St. John's	Western terminus
St. Jones Within	17.2	10.7	Dead End	Eastern terminus
1.000 mi = 1.609 km; 1.000 km = 0.621 mi
