= Hillview-Adeytown =

- Former designated place
- Location of Adeytown in Newfoundland
- Coordinates: 48°04′26″N 53°56′00″W
- Country: Canada
- Province: Newfoundland and Labrador
- Created: 1999
- Abolished: 2008

Population (2006)
  - Total: 307
- Time zone: UTC– 3:30 (Newfoundland Time)
  - Summer (DST): UTC– 2:30 (Newfoundland Daylight)
- Area code: 709
- Highways: Route 1 (TCH); Route 205

Hillview-Adeytown is a former local service district and former designated place on the east coast of Newfoundland in Newfoundland and Labrador, Canada that existed from 1999 until 2008. It consisted of the village of Hillview on the Southwest Arm of Trinity Bay and the village of Adeytown (/ˈeɪdɪtən/ AY-dih-tən) on the Northwest Arm of Trinity Bay, just south of Clarenville.

Today Hillview-Adeytown is part of the designated place of Hillview-Adeytown-Hatchet Cove-St. Jones Within and part of the local service district of Random Sound West.

== History of Adeytown ==
Adeytown (formerly called Lee Bight), like Deep Bight, Piston Mere, Maggoty Cove and Forrester's Point, was founded in the 1850s and 1860s as a small logging operation and, with the building of the Newfoundland Railway, it grew as the demand for lumber was at a peak.

Edward and Pasco Adey came to Lee Bight c.1865 from Hant's Harbour with the intention of logging. Lee Bight had all of the natural requirements for a logging operation, a nearby timber stand sufficient to support a water powered sawmill from a nearby fast flowing brook and clear access to the sea to ship the sawn lumber.

Around 1865, Edward, Israel, and Pasco Adey came to Lee Bight (later Adeytown), from Hants Harbour with the intention of logging. By 1870 a water powered sawmill had been built, one of several in the Northwest Arm in Trinity Bay at the time. The first (Methodist) school in Lee Bight was reported in 1883 with 16 students taught by a Miss Mary Mayo. Miss. Mayo had split her time at the Lee Bight School and the half at the Deep Bight school nearby.

In the early 20th century Adeytown had closed its Methodist school and shared one with Caplin Cove. By 1911 Adeytown had 2 sawmills and a church along with the school shared with Caplin Cove and about 30 people were living there for the 1911 Census. At the height of its economic boom in 1921 Adeytown had become a full logging town with 7 sawmills operating, also by this time there was 38 residents living in Adeytown.

As of September 13, 1966, the Adeytown Post Office closed and in 1970 the school was closed and students were bussed to Deep Bight for Elementary School and Clarenville for High School.

== History of Hillview ==
Hillview (formerly called Northern Bight and North Bight) was populated in the mid-1800s, and renamed in 1913.

In the mid-1800s, James Stoyles and David Benson arrived to Northern Bight (later Hillview) from Grates Cove. By 1891, Hillview had 212 residents. Employment in Hillview varied from fisherman, clergy, farmers, and merchants. In the 1950s, the Labrador fishery and local sawmilling no longer contributed to Hillview, though proximity to Clarenville provided employment opportunities.

Hillview, as Northern Bight, contained the Northern Bight railroad station, which allowed freight to be unloaded and loaded onto boats in Hillview.

Hillview students, as well as Adeytown students, travel to Clarenville for high school.

== See also ==
- List of communities in Newfoundland and Labrador
