= List of protected areas of Newfoundland and Labrador =

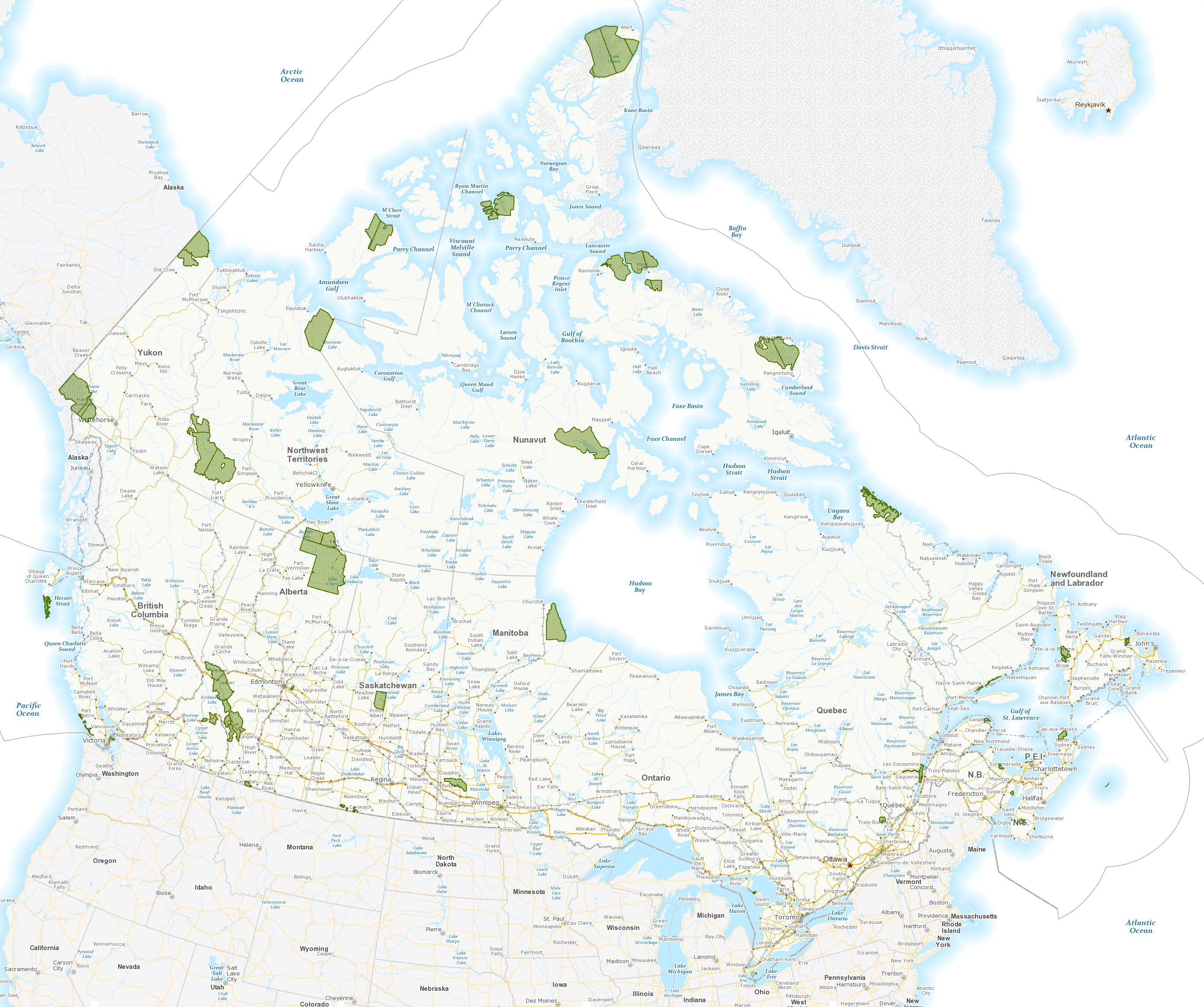
Canada's National Parks and National Reserves by provinces and territories

This is a list of protected areas of Newfoundland and Labrador in Canada.

== National parks ==
- Gros Morne National Park
- Terra Nova National Park
- Torngat Mountains National Park
- Akami−Uapishkᵘ−KakKasuak−Mealy Mountains National Park Reserve

== Provincial parks ==
The Government of Newfoundland and Labrador Environment and Conservation Department, Parks and Natural Areas Division maintains a number of full-use, day use and natural scenic attraction parks, as well as a set of Provincial Park Reserves in both the island and mainland portions of the province.

The T'Railway Provincial Park follows the abandoned Newfoundland Railway line from St. John's to Channel-Port aux Basques.

14 of the 22 provincial parks provide a variety of day use and camping facilities.

Name	Location	Established	Type	Picture	Coordinates
The Arches Provincial Park	Great Northern Peninsula	1980	Day Use		50.11361°N 57.66305°W
Barachois Pond Provincial Park		1961	Camping		48.4722°N 58.2531°W
Blow Me Down Provincial Park	Shore of the Bay of Islands	1975	Camping		49.092°N 58.363°W
Butter Pot Provincial Park	Avalon Peninsula		Camping		47.3847°N 53.0608°W
Cataracts Provincial Park	Avalon Peninsula	1980	Day Use		47.24194°N 53.63027°W
Chance Cove Provincial Park	Avalon Peninsula	1974	Day Use		46.7761°N 53.0361°W
Codroy Valley Provincial Park	Codroy Valley	1978	<closed>		47.8336°N 59.3377°W
Deadman's Bay Provincial Park		1978	Day Use		49.3316°N 53.6925°W
Dildo Run Provincial Park	New World Island	1967	Camping		49.5356°N 54.7219°W
Dungeon Provincial Park	Bonavista Peninsula	1983	Day Use		48.6666°N 53.0838°W
Frenchman's Cove Provincial Park	Burin Peninsula	1970	Camping		47.209°N 55.403°W
Gooseberry Cove Provincial Park	Avalon Peninsula	1980	Day Use		47.068°N 54.0877°W
J.T. Cheeseman Provincial Park		1960	Camping		47.632°N 59.254°W
La Manche Provincial Park	Avalon Peninsula	1975	Camping		47.177°N 52.89°W
Lockston Path Provincial Park	Bonavista Peninsula	1967	Camping		48.438°N 53.3797°W
Main River Waterway Provincial Park	Great Northern Peninsula		Waterway		49.825291°N 57.194068°W
Notre Dame Provincial Park		1960	Camping		49.1161°N 55.0864°W
Pinware River Provincial Park	South coast of Labrador	1975	Camping		51.632°N 56.7042°W
Pistolet Bay Provincial Park	Great Northern Peninsula	1987	Camping		51.533°N 55.682°W
Sandbanks Provincial Park	Burgeo	1985	Camping		47.6072°N 57.6472°W
Sir Richard Squires Memorial Provincial Park		1954	Camping		49.3525°N 57.2027°W
T'Railway Provincial Park	Island of Newfoundland	1997	Linear Rail Trail		48.9672°N 55.616°W

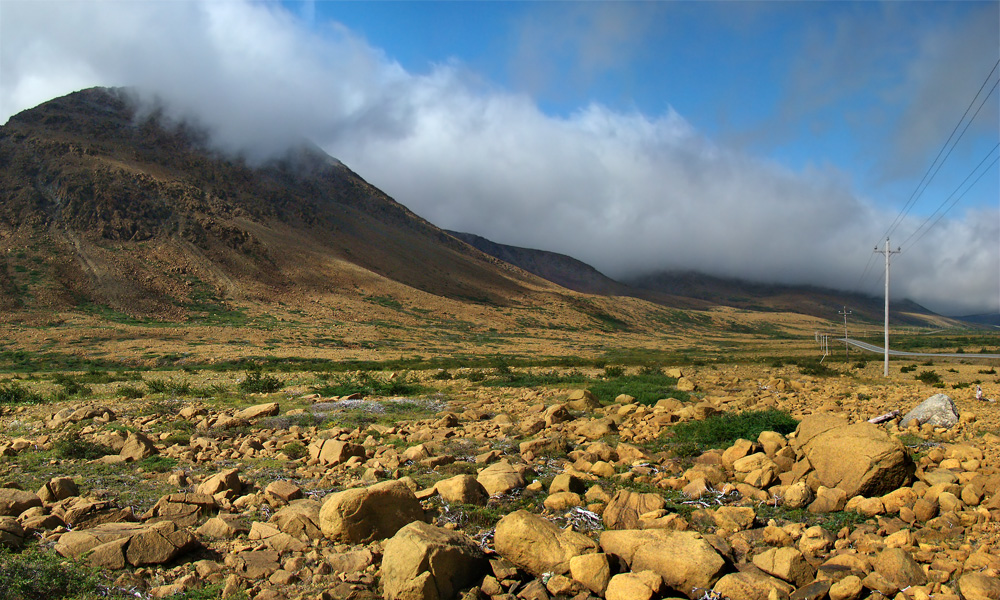
Gros Morne National Park

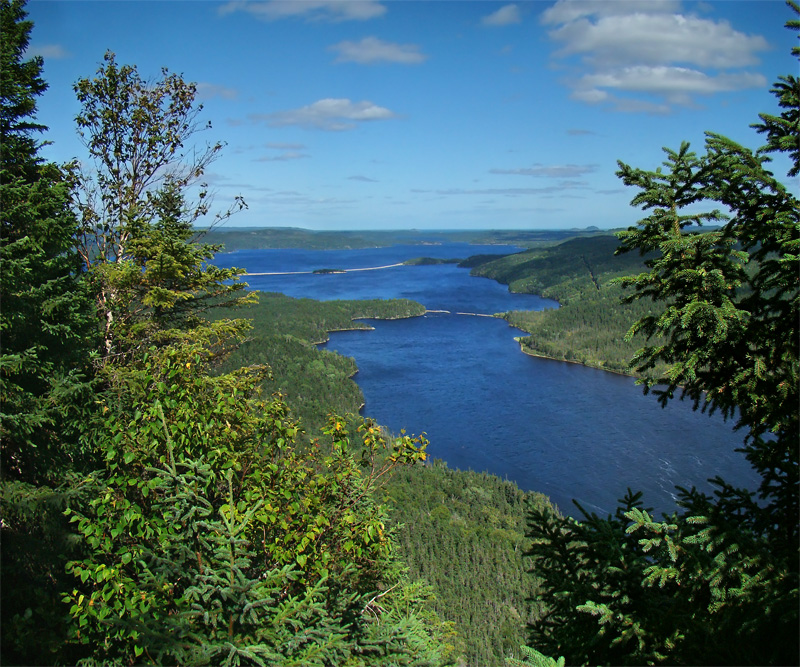
Terra Nova National Park

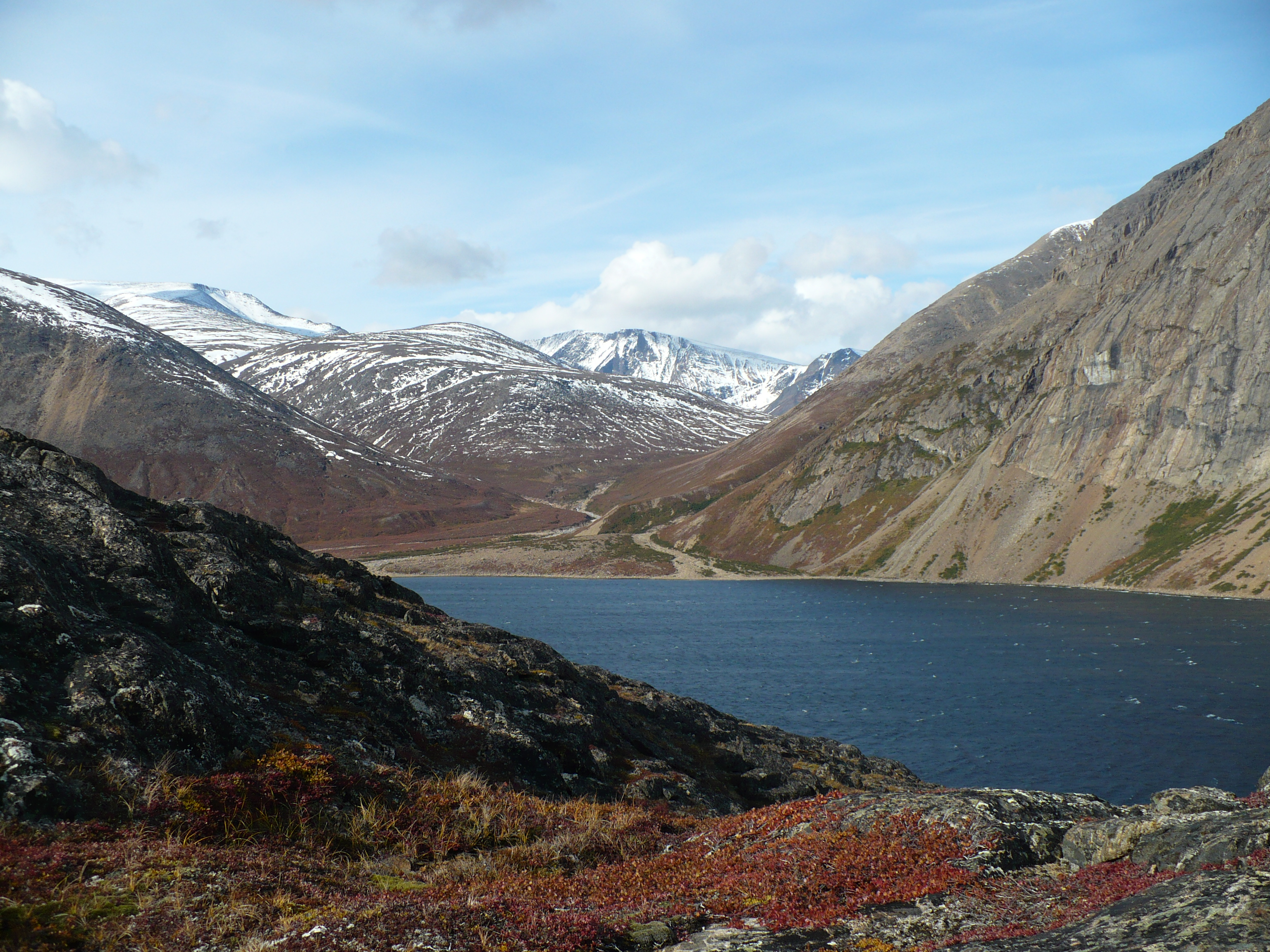
Torngat Mountains National Park

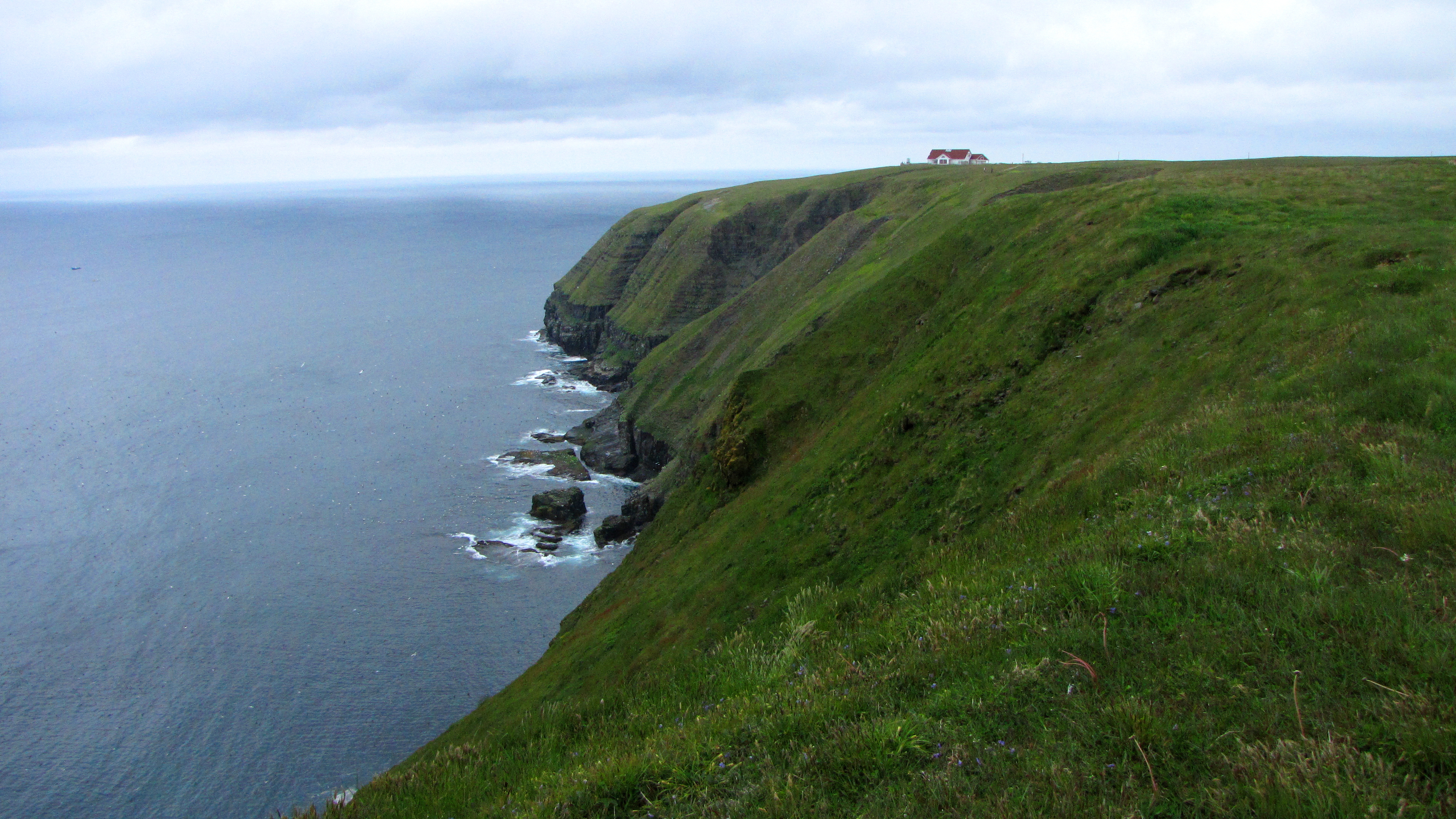
Cape St. Mary's Ecological Reserve

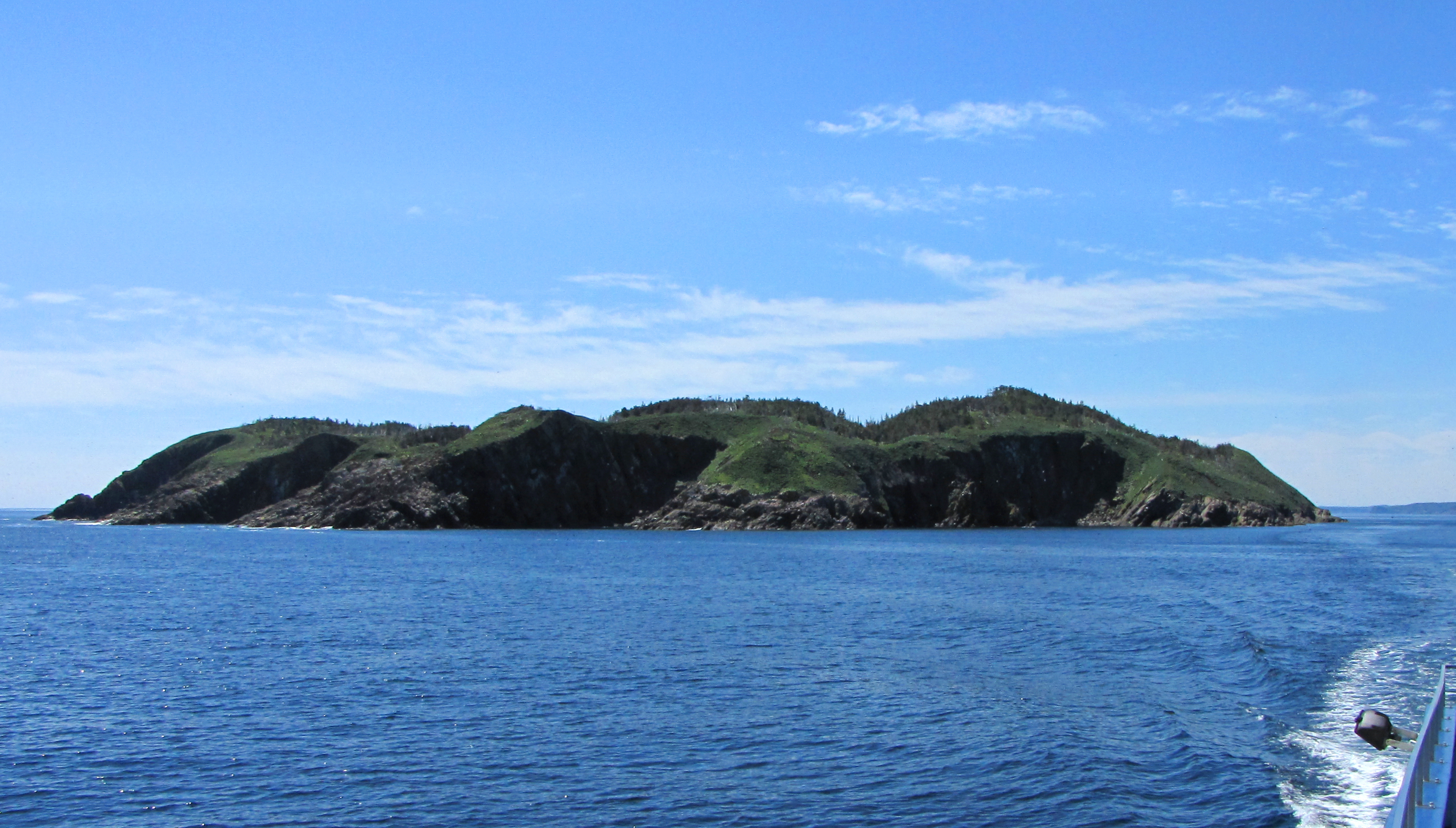
Witless Bay Ecological Reserve

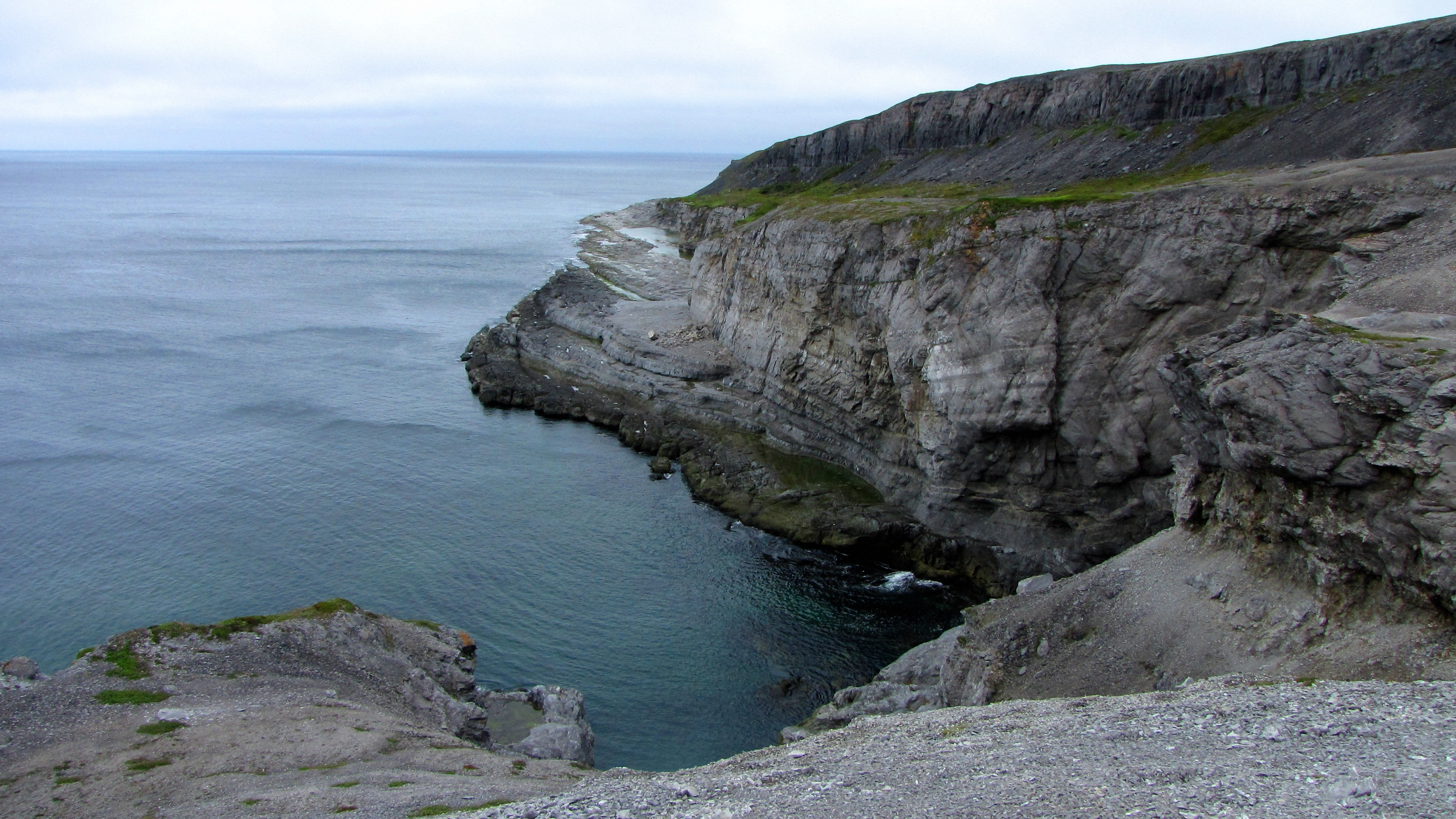
Burnt Cape Ecological Reserve

=== Provincial park reserves ===
The provincial park reserves protect significant natural features or landscapes, and provide no day use or camping facilities. Many of these parks are the remaining landmass of former provincial parks privatized in 1995 or 1997, excluding campground space leased or sold to private operators or closed.

- Bellevue Beach Provincial Park Reserve — Bellevue
- Duley Lake Provincial Park Reserve — Labrador City
- Fitzgeralds Pond Provincial Park Reserve — Dunville, NL
- Flatwater Pond Provincial Park Reserve — Baie Verte
- Grand Codroy Provincial Park Reserve — Doyles
- Grand Lake Provincial Park Reserve — Goose Bay
- Jack's Pond Provincial Park Reserve — Arnold's Cove
- Jipujijkuei Kuespem Provincial Park Reserve — Morrisville
- Jonathan's Pond Provincial Park Reserve — Gander
- Marine Drive Provincial Park Reserve — Pouch Cove
- Windmill Bight Provincial Park Reserve — Lumsden

== Wilderness and Ecological Reserves ==
These provincial reserves are intended to protect wilderness areas and wildlife habitat. They were created under the terms of the Wilderness and Ecological Reserves Act (WER Act) of 1980. With the exception of Burnt Cape, Cape St. Mary's, Mistaken Point, and Witless Bay, these areas contain few facilities and provide limited access to the public.

- Avalon Wilderness Reserve
- Baccalieu Island Ecological Reserve
- Bay du Nord Wilderness Reserve
- Burnt Cape Ecological Reserve
- Cape St. Mary's Ecological Reserve
- Fortune Head Ecological Reserve
- Funk Island Ecological Reserve
- Gannet Islands Ecological Reserve
- Hare Bay Islands Ecological Reserve
- Hawke Hill Ecological Reserve
- King George IV Ecological Reserve
- Little Grand Lake Provisional Ecological Reserve
- Mistaken Point Ecological Reserve
- Redfir Lake - Kapitagas Channel Ecological Reserve
- Table Point Ecological Reserve
- Watts Point Ecological Reserve
- West Brook Ecological Reserve
- Witless Bay Ecological Reserve

== Privatization ==
Between 1995 and 1997, due to rising debt, the provincial government embarked on a program to reduce expenses in the Parks and Recreation system by privatizing a number of Provincial Parks and Natural and Scenic Attractions. This policy was controversial and was still being referenced negatively in debates in the Provincial House of Assembly as late as 2004.

The privatization initiative was intended to retain the level of parks and recreational areas available to residents of and tourists in the province, while reducing the expense to the provincial government. It is unclear how successful this was, as at least of some of the privatized properties were no longer operating as of 2001.

=== Parks Privatized or Closed (1997) ===
These parks and natural scenic attractions were privatized or closed in a second privatization initiative in 1997.

Provincial Parks:

- Backside Pond Provincial Park — Trinity Bay; privately owned and operating as of at least 2024.
- Beothuck Provincial Park — Grand Falls-Windsor; privately owned and operating as of 2019.
- Catamaran Provincial Park — Badger; privately owned and operating as of 2019.
- David Smallwood Provincial Park — Gambo
- Flatwater Pond Provincial Park — Baie Verte
- Gushues Pond Provincial Park — Conception Bay; privately owned and operating as of 2019.
- Indian River Provincial Park — Springdale; privately owned and operating as Blue Canoe as of 2020.
- Northern Bay Sands — Northern Bay, Conception Bay
- Piccadilly Head Provincial Park — Port au Port
- River of Ponds Provincial Park — River of Ponds
- Sop's Arm Provincial Park — White Bay
- Square Pond Provincial Park — Gambo; privately owned and operating as of 2011.

Natural and Scenic Attractions:

- Eastport North — Glovertown
- Middle Cove — St. John's
- Pearson's Peak — Grand Falls-Windsor
- Point au Mal — Stephenville
- Point la Haye — Trepassey
- Salmon Cove Sands — Salmon Cove, Conception Bay
- Topsail Beach — St. John's

=== Parks privatized or closed (1995) ===
These 29 parks were apparently privatized or closed in an initial privatization initiative in 1995.

Provincial Parks:

- Blue Ponds Provincial Park — Corner Brook; privately owned and operating as an RV park as of 2013.
- Cochrane Pond Provincial Park — St. John's; privately owned and operating as of 2013.
- Crabbes River Provincial Park — Crabbes River; privately owned and operating as an RV park as of 2013.
- Freshwater Pond Provincial Park — Marystown
- Holyrood Pond Provincial Park — St. Mary's Bay
- Jipujijkuek Kuespem Provincial Park (formerly Little River Provincial Park) — Morrisville
- Mary March Provincial Park — Buchans
- Mummichog Provincial Park — Channel-Port aux Basques
- Pipers Hole River Provincial Park — Swift Current; known to be abandoned by 2008.

Natural and Scenic Attractions and Outdoor Recreation Parks:

- Aspen Brook Provincial Park — Grand Falls-Windsor
- Black Bank Provincial Park — Barachois Brook
- Bottle Cove Provincial Park — Lark Harbour
- Dog Bay Pond Provincial Park — Summerford
- Father Duffy's Well Provincial Park — Salmonier
- Glenwood Provincial Park — Glenwood
- French Islands Provincial Park — Burin
- Indian Cove Neck Provincial Park — Lewisporte
- Jiggin' Head Provincial Park — Summerville
- Maberly Provincial Park — Bonavista
- Northeast Arm Provincial Park — Glovertown
- Otter Bay Provincial Park — Channel-Port aux Basques
- Pasadena Beach Provincial Park — Pasadena
- Pearson's Peak Provincial Park — Grand Falls-Windsor
- Rattle Falls Provincial Park — Summerville
- Smith Sound Provincial Park — Clarenville
- South West Pond Provincial Park — Salmonier
- Stag Lake Provincial Park — Corner Brook
- Thorburn Lake Provincial Park — Clarenville
- Three Mile Lake Provincial Park — Port au Choix

== See also ==
- List of Canadian provincial parks
- List of National Parks of Canada
