= Blow Me Down Provincial Park =

Provincial park in Newfoundland and Labrador, Canada

Coordinates: 49.092°N 58.363°W

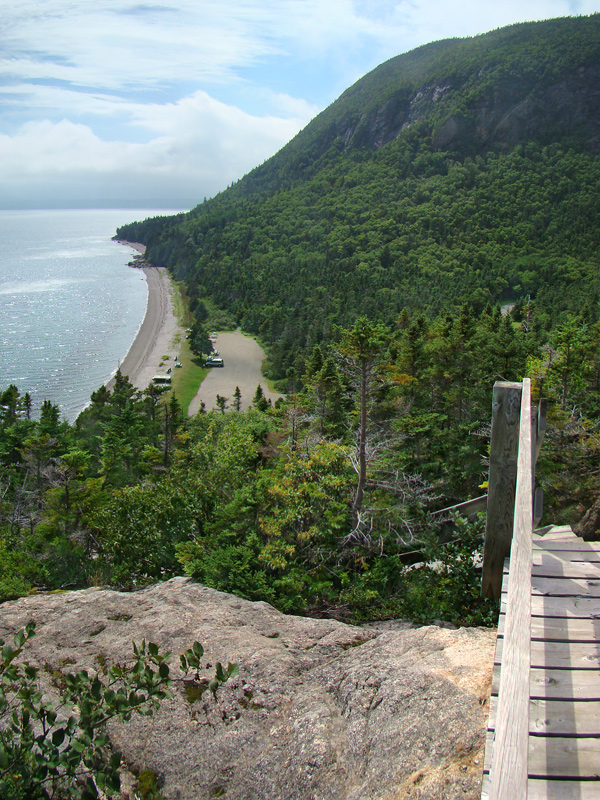
Overlooking the Bay of Islands

Blow Me Down Provincial Park is a smaller Provincial Park on the west coast of the island of Newfoundland. The park is located on Route 450, about 60 km (37 mi) west of Corner Brook and the Trans-Canada Highway, on a small peninsula between Lark Harbour and York Harbour at the mouth of the Bay of Islands.

== See also ==
- List of Newfoundland and Labrador parks
- List of Canadian provincial parks
- List of National Parks of Canada
