= Loreburn =

Loreburn may refer to:

- Loreburn, Newfoundland and Labrador, Canada
- Loreburn, Saskatchewan, Canada
  - Rural Municipality of Loreburn No. 254
- Robert Reid, 1st Earl Loreburn

== See also ==
- Loreburn Hall
- Loreburn Report
