= Newfoundland and Labrador Route 450 =

Highway in Newfoundland and Labrador

Route 450
- Captain Cook's Trail

Route information
- Maintained by Newfoundland and Labrador Department of Transportation and Infrastructure
- Length: 54.7 km (34.0 mi)

Major junctions
- West end: End of pavement in Lark Harbour
- Route 450A in Corner Brook
- East end: Route 1 (TCH) at Corner Brook

Location
- Country: Canada
- Province: Newfoundland and Labrador

Highway system
- Highways in Newfoundland and Labrador
← Route 440	→ Route 450A

Route 450 (also known as Captain Cook's Trail) is a highway in the Canadian province of Newfoundland and Labrador. The highway starts at an interchange at Route 1 (Trans-Canada Highway) in Corner Brook. When approaching O'Connell Drive, motorists can turn left to continue their journey along the route. The route terminates at a cul-de-sac in Lark Harbour.

Route 450 made headlines in Newfoundland in January 2018 when massive rainfall caused flooding on January 13 and created a huge crater causing a large portion in the highway to collapse, thus separating residents in Lark Harbour and York Harbour from the remainder of the island. The impacted portion of the road was reopened to traffic on January 17, 2018.

== Route description ==
Route 450 begins in Corner Brook at an interchange with Route 1 (Trans-Canada Highway, Exit 4), with the road continuing northeast as Massey Drive to the town of the same name. It heads west along the southern edge of the city to have an intersection with Wheelers Road, which provides access to the Grenfell Campus. The highway now heads northwest through neighbourhood/industrial area to have intersections with Mac Donald Brown Drive, Lundrigan Drive, Sunnyslope Drive, O'Connell Drive, before making a sharp left turn at an intersection with Route 450A (Lewin Parkway). Route 450 now passes through the Curling section of town before leaving Corner Brook before winding its along the southern shore of Humber Arm to pass through Mount Moriah (where it crosses Cooks Brook), Humber Arm South (where a couple of turns are needed to stay on the highway, one to the right, and the other to the left), and York Harbour, all within the rugged terrain of the Lewis Hills portion of the Long Range Mountains. The highway now enters Lark Harbour and passes by Blow Me Down Provincial Park before passing through town, where it has an intersection with a local road leading to Bottle Cove and Little Port, before the pavement (and Route 450) comes to an end at the eastern edge of town.

== Attractions along Route 450 ==
- Blow Me Down Provincial Park

== Major intersections ==
Location	km	mi	Destinations	Notes
Lark Harbour	0.0	0.0	End of provincial maintenance	Western terminus
Lark Harbour	1.6	0.99	Little Port Road - Little Port, Bottle Cove	
Lark Harbour / York Harbour town line	3.0	1.9	Blow Me Down Provincial Park main entrance	Access road into park
Corner Brook	45.5	28.3	Route 450A east (Lewin Parkway) – Downtown	Western terminus of Route 450A
Corner Brook	52.2	32.4	Wheelers Road - Grenfell Campus	
Corner Brook	54.7	34.0	Route 1 (TCH) – Deer Lake, Port aux Basques Massey Drive - Massey Drive	Exit 4 on Route 1; eastern terminus; road continues east as Massey Drive
1.000 mi = 1.609 km; 1.000 km = 0.621 mi
