= St. Jones =

St. Jones may refer to:

- St. Jones River, a river flowing to Delaware Bay in central Delaware, United States
- St. Jones Within, Newfoundland and Labrador, Canada
