= Bottle Cove =

- Fishing Village
- Location of Bottle Cove in Newfoundland
- Coordinates: 49°06′51″N 58°24′33″W
- Country: Canada
- Province: Newfoundland and Labrador

Population (2006)
  - Total: Approx. 10
- Time zone: UTC-3:30 (Newfoundland Time)
  - Summer (DST): UTC-2:30 (Newfoundland Daylight)
- Area code: 709

Bottle Cove is located on the west coast of Newfoundland. It opens directly onto the Gulf of Saint Lawrence, although it is typically included in the regional descriptor, "Bay of Islands," which lies at the mouth of the Humber Arm. Bottle Cove is also referred to as Bottle Cove Provincial Park and as Bottle Cove Day Park (no amenities) in official Parks documentation.

Bottle Cove lies in the Newfoundland Time Zone (UTC−3.5) and observes daylight saving time. Newfoundland is considered to have a humid continental climate. Winter day temperatures in the area of Bottle Cove tend to average 0 degrees C (32 degrees Fahrenheit). Summer has an average day temperature of around 16 °C (61°Fahrenheit).

== History ==
There is little specific written documentation available regarding the history of Bottle Cove. Small evidence of possible use by members of the Little Passage culture (dating to approximately 1200-1500 AD) has been found in the cove (e.g., an arrow flint point, found by Averil Childs in 1971).

Bottle Cove is believed to have been used as a French fishing station from the early 16th century. A fishing station was always seasonal, with fishermen setting up a temporary base and then returning to their home country at the end of the fishing season. Given the proximity of Bottle Cove—especially by sea—to Port-aux-Basques which was a fishing station for Basque fishermen during the 15th century, it is highly likely that the cove was frequented by Basque fisherman before French fisherfolk laid claim to it. The name of the cove is an Anglicisation of "bateau" which is French for "boat". "Bottle" fits the cove well, though, due to its almost perfect circular shape and narrowly separated headlands opening to the Gulf.

Census records for 1891 show 38 people living in Bottle Cove, and by 1921 listed seven families (42 people in all) living in Bottle Cove. The cove was used as a port for local fishermen during the 20th century until Little Port, two kilometres away, was developed as a modern port and safe harbour for boats in the 1970s. Today, a few fishing sheds remain along the shore of Bottle Cove. Currently, there are six homes to be found dotted about the Cove itself.

Bottle Cove, and nearby Lark Harbour and York Harbour were outport settlements until 1961, when a road (Route 450) to Corner Brook was completed and the communities no longer needed to travel by boat to buy supplies and obtain key services. Residential telephones only became available to the community in the early 1970s. Today there is still no mobile phone access and internet and television access is by satellite dish. Free community internet provision is available at the Lark Harbour Library via the Community Access Programme (CAP).

== Points of interest ==
Captain James Cook charted the area in 1776. A cairn on the northern headland of Bottle Cove marks what Cook referred to as "Trail's End" — the farthest point of this particular branch of the Humber Arm mapped by Cook. Locals tell how the detailed maps of this area created by Cook are still in maritime use.

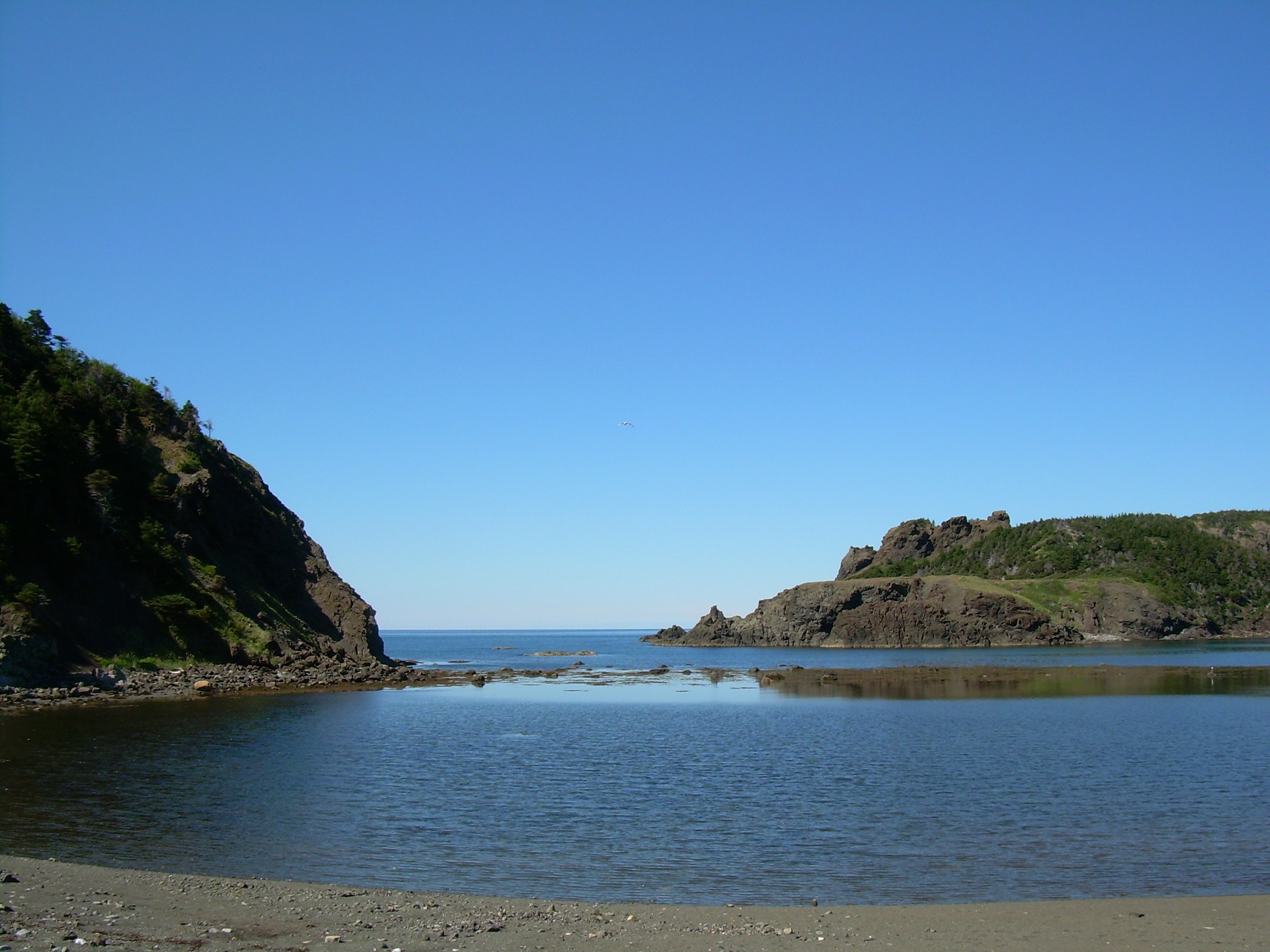
A view of Bottle Cove, looking towards the headland. The wave cut platform (and Cook's Trail's End) are visible on the right-hand side of this picture.

Bottle Cove is renowned for its geological richness. The cliffs surrounding the cove are part of the Appalachian Mountains. Much of the rock formations visible in the Cove are "part of a slice of rocks, tens of kilometres across, known as the Humber Arm Allochthon". This layer of rock was pushed up and over sedimentary rocks during tectonic plate movement. "As the allochthon was moving, shales underneath it were broken up and mixed with sedimentary, volcanic and ocean crust rocks (ophiolite) from the slice itself, to form material known as mélange". In addition, rounded, bulbous masses—dark green and red basalt pillow lavas—thought to have been extruded under water can be seen at low tide. The sea has carved these sedimentary, mélange and lava rocks into curious and intriguing shapes. At low tide it is possible to walk to a sea-carved "cave" on the south side of the cove.

Bottle Cove is host to a raised wave-cut platform: "As the glaciers shrank inland from Gulf of St. Lawrence, they paused at the mouths of many fjords about 13000 years ago and sea level stabilized 35 m above its present level. Wave action, combined with intense frost action during the severe climate, cut this prominent intertidal platform into the solid rock. Eventual disappearance of the glaciers allowed the land to rebound and the old shoreline was left high and dry." This platform forms part of one headland of the cove.

== Walking trails ==
View from South Head walking trail

During recent years the Outer Bay of Islands Enhancement Committee has overseen the construction of numerous walking trails and facilities. The trails are well-defined and include long stretches of wooden boardwalk as well as trails cut through bushland of varying degrees of length and difficulty. They range from short (15 minute) strolls on fairly level ground to half day hikes. Difficulty levels vary from easy to extreme.

Popular hikes in the vicinity of Bottle Cove include Little Port Head (extreme in places), South Head Lighthouse (moderate), Cedar Cove (easy to moderate), and Trail End (marking the end point of Captain Cook's mapping of the Bay of Islands).
