= Appleton, Newfoundland and Labrador =

Appleton
- Town
- Motto: Room to Grow
- Location of Appleton in Newfoundland
- Coordinates: 48°59′08″N 54°51′53″W
- Country: Canada
- Province: Newfoundland and Labrador
- Census division: 6
- Incorporated: February 27, 1962

Government
  - Mayor: Garrett Watton

Area
  - Land: 6.39 km^{2} (2.47 sq mi)

Population (2021)
  - Total: 620
- Time zone: UTC-3:30 (Newfoundland Time)
  - Summer (DST): UTC-2:30 (Newfoundland Daylight)
- Area code: 709
- Highways: Route 1 (TCH)
- Website: townofappleton.com

Appleton is a town in the northeastern part of Newfoundland in the province of Newfoundland and Labrador, Canada.

It is located in Division No. 6, on Gander Lake, southeast of Glenwood.

== History ==
Appleton was incorporated on February 27, 1962. On January 27, 1962, a public meeting was held at the Appleton Community School for the purpose of organizing the community under the Community Councils Act. Mr. William B. Temple acted as Chairman and Lewis C. Little acted as Secretary. There were thirty-seven voters in attendance. It was voted that there would be five members on the Appleton Community Council:

- Miss Zippoorah Steele
- Mr. Wilfred Richards
- Mr. Lewis C. Little
- Mr. Leslie Reid
- Mr. Cyril Ford

== Demographics ==
In the 2021 Census of Population conducted by Statistics Canada, Appleton had a population of 620 living in 265 of its 285 total private dwellings, a change of 8% from its 2016 population of 574. With a land area of 6.33 km^{2} (2.44 sq mi), it had a population density of 97.9/km^{2} (253.7/sq mi) in 2021.

Demographics
Population in 2016	574
Population change from 2011	-7.7%
Median age (2016)	48.2
Number of families (2016)	195
Number of married couples (2016)	320
Total number of dwellings (2016)	240
Catholic (2001);	23.5%
Protestant (2001)	75.7%
2016 Land Area (km^{2})	6.39

	North: Division No. 6, Subd. E
West: Glenwood	Appleton	East: Division No. 6, Subd. E
	South: Division No. 6, Subd. E

== See also ==
- List of cities and towns in Newfoundland and Labrador
