= Southwest Arm =

Location of Southwest Arm in Newfoundland and Labrador

Southwest Arm is an inlet of Random Sound, Trinity Bay, in Newfoundland and Labrador.

The Southwest Arm is bordered by a number of small communities called outports. On the north side of the arm are Ivany's Cove, Hillview, Hatchet Cove, and St. Jones Within. On the southern shore are Northwest Brook, Queen's Cove, Long Beach, Hodge's Cove, Caplin Cove, Little Heart's Ease, Gooseberry Cove, Southport and Butter Cove.
