= Norris Arm =

- Town
- Seal
- Motto: "The Town With The Sensational Sunset"
- Location of Norris Arm in Newfoundland
- Coordinates: 49°05′N 55°16′W
- Country: Canada
- Province: Newfoundland and Labrador
- Census division: 6
- Settled: 1700s
- Incorporated (town): 1971

Government
  - Type: Town Council
  - Mayor: Ross Rowsell
  - MP: Clifford Small (CPC)
  - MHA: Pleaman Forsey (PC)

Area
  - Total: 41.49 km^{2} (16.02 sq mi)
- Elevation: 22 m (72 ft)

Population (2021)
  - Total: 708
  - Density: 17.1/km^{2} (44.2/sq mi)
- Time zone: UTC-3:30 (Newfoundland Time)
  - Summer (DST): UTC-2:30 (Newfoundland Daylight)
- Postal Code Span: A0G
- Area code: 709
- Highways: Route 1 (TCH); Route 351
- Website: https://municipalnl.ca/municipality/norris-arm/

Norris Arm is a town in north-central Newfoundland, Newfoundland and Labrador, Canada. It is in Division No. 6, on the Bay of Exploits.

== Demographics ==
In the 2021 Census of Population conducted by Statistics Canada, Norris Arm had a population of 708 living in 334 of its 435 total private dwellings, a change of −3.9% from its 2016 population of 737. With a land area of 41.35 km^{2} (15.97 sq mi), it had a population density of 17.1/km^{2} (44.3/sq mi) in 2021.

== Climate ==
Climate data for Norris Arm
Month	Jan	Feb	Mar	Apr	May	Jun	Jul	Aug	Sep	Oct	Nov	Dec	Year
Record high °C (°F)	13.5 (56.3)	14 (57)	17 (63)	23.5 (74.3)	29 (84)	33 (91)	34 (93)	35 (95)	30 (86)	25.6 (78.1)	21.1 (70.0)	17.8 (64.0)	35 (95)
Mean daily maximum °C (°F)	−2 (28)	−2.2 (28.0)	1.7 (35.1)	6.4 (43.5)	13 (55)	18.8 (65.8)	23.4 (74.1)	22.1 (71.8)	17.1 (62.8)	11 (52)	5.9 (42.6)	0.5 (32.9)	9.7 (49.5)
Daily mean °C (°F)	−6.8 (19.8)	−7.4 (18.7)	−3 (27)	2.2 (36.0)	7.8 (46.0)	13 (55)	17.7 (63.9)	16.7 (62.1)	12 (54)	6.7 (44.1)	2.2 (36.0)	−3.6 (25.5)	4.8 (40.6)
Mean daily minimum °C (°F)	−11.8 (10.8)	−12.8 (9.0)	−7.8 (18.0)	−2 (28)	2.5 (36.5)	7.1 (44.8)	11.9 (53.4)	11.3 (52.3)	6.9 (44.4)	2.4 (36.3)	−1.6 (29.1)	−7.9 (17.8)	−0.2 (31.6)
Record low °C (°F)	−32.8 (−27.0)	−36.7 (−34.1)	−32 (−26)	−18.5 (−1.3)	−9.4 (15.1)	−3.5 (25.7)	0 (32)	−0.6 (30.9)	−3.3 (26.1)	−10 (14)	−20 (−4)	−33.3 (−27.9)	−36.7 (−34.1)
Average precipitation mm (inches)	108 (4.3)	92.3 (3.63)	105.6 (4.16)	82.4 (3.24)	81.7 (3.22)	85.3 (3.36)	80.4 (3.17)	103.1 (4.06)	82.7 (3.26)	104.4 (4.11)	100.5 (3.96)	107.8 (4.24)	1,134.2 (44.65)
Source: 1961-1990 Environment Canada

== See also ==
- List of cities and towns in Newfoundland and Labrador
