= Newfoundland and Labrador Route 450A =

Highway in Newfoundland and Labrador, Canada

Route 450A
- Lewin Parkway

Route information
- Auxiliary route of Route 450
- Maintained by Newfoundland and Labrador Department of Transportation and Infrastructure
- Length: 6.5 km (4.0 mi)

Major junctions
- West end: Route 450 in Corner Brook
- East end: Route 1 (TCH) in Corner Brook

Location
- Country: Canada
- Province: Newfoundland and Labrador

Highway system
- Highways in Newfoundland and Labrador
← Route 450	→ Route 460

Route 450A, also known as Lewin Parkway, is an alternate route of Route 450 in the city of Corner Brook, Newfoundland and Labrador. The route runs from Route 450, through downtown Corner Brook, to Route 1 (Trans-Canada Highway). Lewin Parkway functions as a city route through Corner Brook, and is designated as the route between Route 450 and Route 1. Route 450A is about 6.5 kilometres (4.0 mi) long.

The section of Route 450A between the Trans-Canada Highway and the Riverside Drive is designated as a Core Route (Intermodule link) of Canada's National Highway System as it connects Route 1 with the Port of Corner Brook.

== Major intersections ==
The entire route is in Corner Brook.

km	mi	Destinations	Notes
0.0	0.0	Route 450 to Route 1 (TCH) – Mount Moriah, Humber Arm South	At-grade; through traffic follows Route 450 east
3.4	2.1	Mill Road	
4.0	2.5	Riverside Drive, Humber Road, Main Street	Grade separated
6.0	3.7	Confederation Drive	
6.5	4.0	Route 1 (TCH) – Deer Lake, St. John's, Channel-Port aux Basques	Grade separated; exit 6 on Route 1
1.000 mi = 1.609 km; 1.000 km = 0.621 mi
