= Howley, Newfoundland and Labrador =

Coordinates: 49.167°N 57.117°W

Howley
- Town
- Interactive map of Howley
- Country: Canada
- Province: Newfoundland and Labrador

Population (2021)
  - Total: 179
- Time zone: UTC-3:30 (Newfoundland Time)
  - Summer (DST): UTC-2:30 (Newfoundland Daylight)
- Area code: 709
- Highways: Route 401

Howley is a town in the Canadian province of Newfoundland and Labrador, with a population of 179. It is located on Route 401, 13 km from the Trans-Canada Highway (Route 1), approximately thirty minutes' drive from the Deer Lake Airport. Services in Howley include a pub, a convenience store, a bed and breakfast, a campground, and a small hotel.

== Demographics ==
In the 2021 Census of Population conducted by Statistics Canada, Howley had a population of 179 living in 96 of its 135 total private dwellings, a change of −12.7% from its 2016 population of 205. With a land area of 19.91 km^{2} (7.69 sq mi), it had a population density of 9.0/km^{2} (23.3/sq mi) in 2021.

== See also ==
- List of cities and towns in Newfoundland and Labrador
