= Newfoundland and Labrador Route 401 =

Highway in Newfoundland and Labrador, Canada

Route 401
- Howley Road

Route information
- Maintained by Newfoundland and Labrador Department of Transportation and Infrastructure
- Length: 13 km (8.1 mi)

Major junctions
- South end: End of asphalt pavement in Howley
- North end: Route 1 (TCH) east of Deer Lake

Location
- Country: Canada
- Province: Newfoundland and Labrador

Highway system
- Highways in Newfoundland and Labrador
← Route 392	→ Route 402

Route 401, also known as Howley Road, is a 13-kilometre-long (8.1 mi) minor highway in the western region of Newfoundland in the Canadian province of Newfoundland and Labrador. The highway begins at a junction with the Trans-Canada Highway (Route 1) and continues to its southern terminus, the community of Howley. There are no other major intersections or communities along the entire length of Route 401. As with most highways in Newfoundland and Labrador, Route 401 is a two-lane highway in its entirety. Route 401 in NL is one of just a couple highways in Newfoundland that now have a kilometer-marker signs, installed by the local community sandy Lake fire department to help locating fires and accidents.

== Major intersections ==
Location	km	mi	Destinations	Notes
	0.0	0.0	Route 1 (TCH) – Deer Lake, Grand Falls-Windsor	Northern terminus
Howley	13	8.1	End of provincial maintenance	Southern terminus; road continues as a gravel road
1.000 mi = 1.609 km; 1.000 km = 0.621 mi
