= Pipers Hole River Provincial Park =

Provincial park in Newfoundland and Labrador, Canada

Coordinates: 47°55′50″N 54°16′17″W

Pipers Hole River Provincial Park was a provincial park situated near Swift Current, Newfoundland and Labrador. The park was privatized in 1995 as a cost-cutting initiative by the provincial government. Between 1995 and 2008 the new owner failed and abandoned the property, and the park is no longer operating and is no longer a protected area under provincial jurisdiction.
