= Gander Lake =

Lake in Newfoundland, Canada

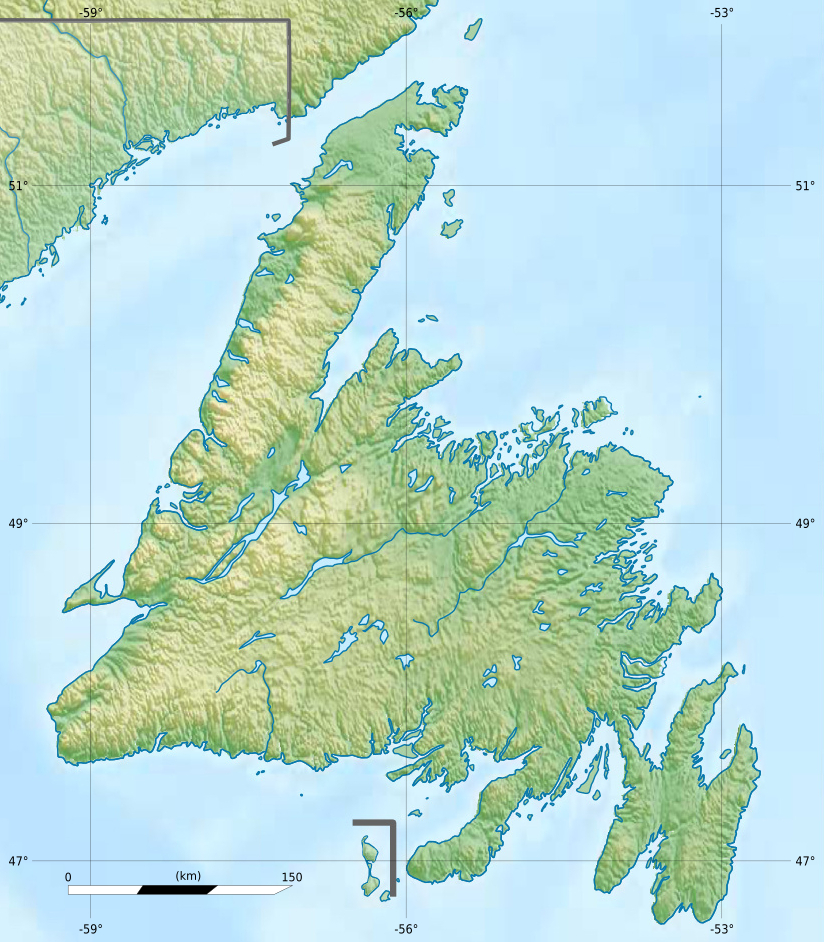
- Location within Newfoundland

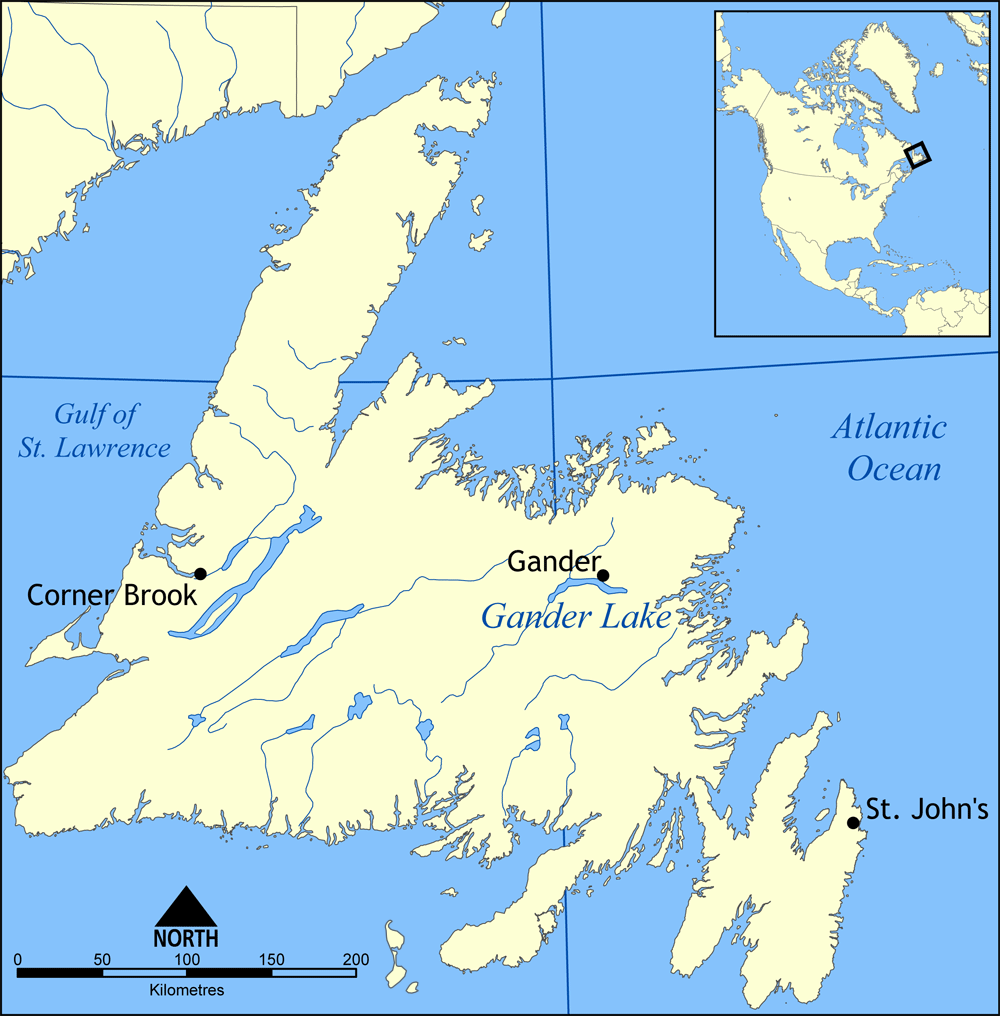
- Map showing the location of Gander Lake
- Location: Newfoundland
- Coordinates: 48°55′52″N 54°44′03″W
- Basin countries: Canada
- Max. length: 56 km (35 mi)
- Max. width: 4 km (2.5 mi)
- Surface area: 113.2 km^{2} (43.7 sq mi)
- Average depth: 105.4 m (346 ft)
- Max. depth: 288 m (945 ft)
- Water volume: 11.93 km^{3} (9,670,000 acre⋅ft)
- Surface elevation: 29 m (95 ft)

Gander Lake is located in the central part of the island of Newfoundland in the Canadian province of Newfoundland and Labrador. It is the third-largest lake in Newfoundland. Gander Lake, Gander River and Gander Bay are thought to have gained their names from the wild geese that frequent the area.

Measuring 56 km (35 mi) in length and several kilometres in width, the lake is oriented roughly northwest–southeast. The town of Gander is located on the northern shore at roughly its midpoint, and the towns of Appleton and Glenwood are situated on the Western extremity of the lake, on the banks of the Gander River. Gander Lake has been measured to a depth of 288 m (945 ft) in some areas.

It is the main source of water for the towns of Gander, Appleton and Glenwood.

== Access ==
Near the southeastern end of the lake, just over 12 km (7.5 mi) outside of the town of Gander, there is a small, quarry-cut, artificial harbour, commonly known as "Little Harbour". This area contains is a concrete public boat launch and a fire pit area for day trips. Camping is frowned upon, if not outright forbidden in the immediate area of the boat launch. However there are two pebble beaches which are used by tenters, accessible from the dirt roads surrounding the cove. Boaters have much better access to both pebble and sand beaches that run along both sides of the lake, such as one commonly known as the "fifteen mile brook", which are excellent for camping. Other well known areas throughout the lake include "Hunt's Cove", "Southwest", "Gander River" and "Denty's Pit".
