= Stavanger Drive Shopping Area =

Coordinates: 47.61581°N 52.71719°W

The Stavanger Drive Shopping Area (also known as Cabot Square Power Centre) is a commercial district in the northeastern part of St. John's, Newfoundland and Labrador, Canada. It is located at the intersection of Torbay Road and Stavanger Drive, just north of Route 1 (Trans-Canada Highway or Outer Ring Road). The district first opened in 1995 with stores of Costco (then known as Price Club) and Zellers. As of 2015, the original area bordering Stavanger Drive has become almost entirely saturated with stores, and most further expansions are occurring to its northwest, around Hebron Way. It is accessible via two interchanges off Route 1, which are Exit 48 (Torbay Road) and Exit 49 (Aberdeen Avenue). The area is located close to St. John's International Airport.

== Tenants ==
=== Other retailers ===
- A Buck or Two
- Addition Elle
- Bombay
- La-Z-Boy Furniture Galleries
- Mark's
- Michaels
- Old Navy
- Pier 1 Imports
- Princess Auto
- Reitmans
- Royal Bank of Canada
- The Shoe Company
- SportChek
- PetSmart
- Dollarama
- Bulk Barn
- le boudoir
- Mastermind Toys
- PetValu
- Best Buy
- la vie en rose
- Wal-Mart
- Chatters
- GameStop (formerly EB Games)
- Dominion
- Canadian Tire
- Winners
- Marshalls
- Piper's
- Newfoundland Canvas
- Cleo
- Staples
- Kent

=== Restaurants ===
- Boston Pizza
- Quesada Burritos & Tacos
- McDonald's
- Little Caesars
- freshii
- Swiss Chalet
- KFC
- Starbucks
- Montana's
- Tim Hortons
- Harvey's
- Pita Pit
- Wing'n'It
- Second Cup
- Subway

=== Hotels ===
- Hampton Inn & Suites
