= Newfoundland and Labrador Route 351 =

Highway in Newfoundland and Labrador, Canada

Route 351
- Rattling Brook Road

Route information
- Maintained by Newfoundland and Labrador Department of Transportation and Infrastructure
- Length: 11.5 km (7.1 mi)

Location
- Country: Canada
- Province: Newfoundland and Labrador

Highway system
- Highways in Newfoundland and Labrador
← Route 350	→ Route 352

Route 351 is a highway on the island of Newfoundland in the Canadian province of Newfoundland and Labrador. It is one of a small number of provincial routes that start and end on the same highway (in this case, the Trans-Canada Highway) (Route 1). It is a very short route, running through its only community, Norris Arm.

== Major intersections ==
The entire route is in Norris Arm.

km	mi	Destinations	Notes
0.0	0.0	Route 1 (TCH) – Gander, Grand Falls-Windsor	Western terminus
2.2	1.4	Sandy Point Road (Route 3-1-09) - Sandy Point, Jumpers Brook	
11.5	7.1	Route 1 (TCH) – Gander, Grand Falls-Windsor	Eastern terminus
1.000 mi = 1.609 km; 1.000 km = 0.621 mi
