= Gooseberry Cove =

Coordinates: 48°01′58″N 53°38′31″W

Location of Gooseberry Cove in Newfoundland and Labrador

Gooseberry Cove is a settlement in the Trinity Bay area of Newfoundland located on an area of land known as the Southwest Arm, which extends off the Trans Canada Highway on Route 204. It is neighbored by the communities of Butter Cove and Southport.

Gooseberry Cove was first settled by inshore fishing families sometime around 1832. The earliest names which were present were Langor, Seward, Balsom and Smith, and many of these family names can be still found in the community today. It became a village in 1940, with a population of 640; by 1956 the population had dropped to 141. The first Postmistress was Delilah Florence Smith.

Within the community is the main road which runs right through the community itself, with one small side-road which leads to the fish plant and community wharf. There is another road which circumvents the community and leads to nearby Southport, and though built in the 1980s is still referred to as "The New Road". Many residents have built homes along The New Road. Gooseberry cove is home to three hiking trails, all of which begin behind St. Alban's Anglican church. The shortest being Jack Baker's Hill path, a moderate one kilometer trail that follows the seaside cliffs and barrens before exiting near the community's wharf. Heart's Ease Beach trail, being the most popular. Is a moderate three kilometer loop that takes you across a rocky tombolo beach and to the coastal headlands which includes a large sea arch. The longest and most difficult trail being the West Random Head trail. A strenuous 7.5 km out and back trail that takes you along the coastal cliffs to West Random Head. a headland separating Trinity Bay and Random Sound.

== Businesses ==
Almost entirely a fishing community, the village has a small convenience store, a post office, and a modest fish plant (each of which employs just one person). The community once had a small school which accommodated Kindergarten to Grade 6, but that school was shut down in the late 1980s, with all children now being bused to nearby Little Heart's Ease for schooling.

== Employment ==
Most of the residents engage in the fishery for their primary source of employment, and most of those who do not must travel to the nearby town of Clarenville for work. Following the collapse of the cod fishery in the late 1980s and early 1990s, the once abundant cod and caplin fisheries were replaced by the crab fishery, and this focus has persisted into the 21st century.

There is also St. Alban's Anglican Church and a Catholic church.

Near the community is a cod fish farm, which is operated by Claude Seward.

== See also ==
- List of communities in Newfoundland and Labrador
- List of people of Newfoundland and Labrador
