= Little Port, Newfoundland and Labrador =

Settlement in Canada

Coordinates: 49.101°N 58.385°W

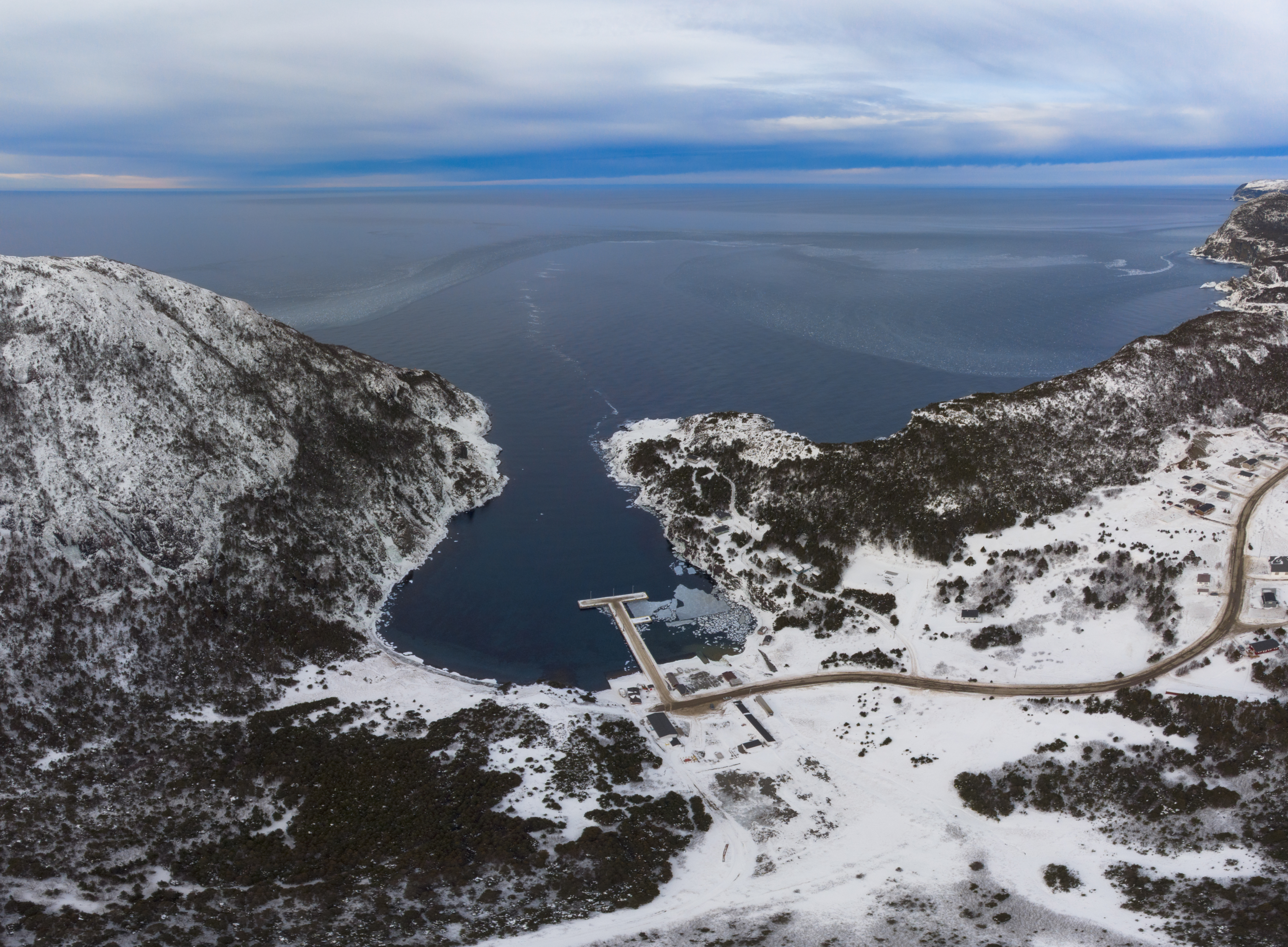
Little Port Head, Newfoundland

Location of Little Port in Newfoundland and Labrador

Little Port is a settlement in the Canadian province of Newfoundland and Labrador.
