= Barachois Pond Provincial Park =

Provincial park in Newfoundland and Labrador, Canada

- IUCN category II (national park)
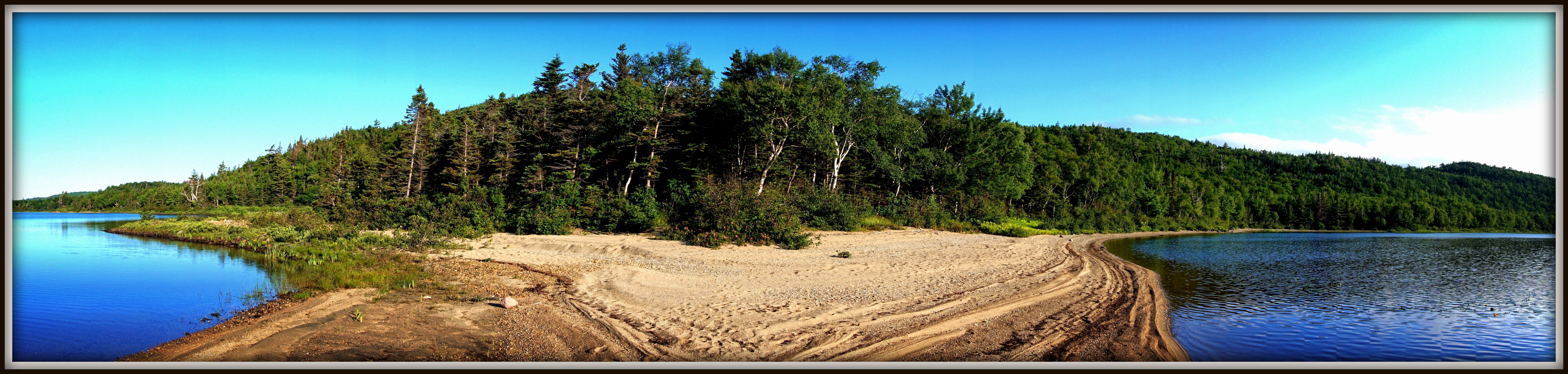

- Location within Canada
- Interactive map of Barachois Pond Provincial Park
- Location: Newfoundland, Canada
- Nearest city: Stephenville, St. George's
- Coordinates: 48°28′20″N 58°15′11″W
- Area: 35 km^{2} (14 sq mi)
- Governing body: Newfoundland and Labrador Government - Parks & Natural Areas Division

Barachois Pond Provincial Park is a large and popular Provincial Park in the southwest of the island of Newfoundland. The park covers an area of 35 km^{2} (14 sq mi). The park is off the Trans-Canada Highway, near Stephenville.

There is a hiking path to the top of Erin Mountain, a peak in the Long Range Mountains, which run along the west coast of Newfoundland. This trail takes about 2 hours and goes by many streams and wildlife.

Barachois Pond is a large lake located in the park.

Chipmunks were first introduced into Newfoundland here.

== See also ==
- Barachois
- List of Newfoundland and Labrador parks
- List of Canadian provincial parks
- List of National Parks of Canada
