= Benton, Newfoundland and Labrador =

Local Service District in Newfoundland and Labrador, Canada

Coordinates: 48.899°N 54.413°W

Location of Benton in Newfoundland and Labrador

Benton is a local service district and designated place in the Canadian province of Newfoundland and Labrador.

== History ==
When the railway was constructed in the late 1800s, Benton became a sawmill town. The railroad also made it possible for a handful of mines and quarries (though less well known) able to operate in Central Newfoundland. This included a granite quarry at Benton called Hall's Quarry.

The Newfoundland Railway was constructed between 1881 and 1897. The track arrived in Benton at the end of the 1892 construction season. The first inhabitants of Benton were Railway Section crews. Closely followed by shop keepers, quarry men, loggers and sawmill operators. Issac Penney arrived in Benton in the 1920s and was a section foreman for the railway. Jim Wicks brought his family to Benton in 1939 and was a cook in the logging camps and later ran a general store. 1979 Theodore Keats and his Son Allan started working as prospectors traveling all over Newfoundland and Labrador in search of the Theodore's Grandfather "Soulis Joe's" lost silver mine. in the years to follow. many of the Keats' family joined the prospecting field Brothers, Brother in laws, sons, nephews and grandsons. This field has been a great success especially for Allan and his son Kevin? Also for Stephen and Mick Stares (Allan's nephews). In 2007 Four generations of Keats Stares family won a prestigious award the PDAC Convention "Bill Dennis Prospectors of the Year Award!" November 3, 2023 Allan Keats received honorary membership to the Canadian Institute of Mining. The mining industry continues to be a huge success because of the prospectors of this little community of Benton!

== Geography ==
Benton is in Newfoundland within Subdivision E of Division No. 6.

== Demographics ==
As a designated place in the 2016 Census of Population conducted by Statistics Canada, Benton recorded a population of 154 living in 69 of its 83 total private dwellings, a change of -9.9% from its 2011 population of 171. With a land area of 4.71 km^{2} (1.82 sq mi), it had a population density of 32.7/km^{2} (84.7/sq mi) in 2016.

== Government ==
Benton is a local service district (LSD) that is governed by a committee responsible for the provision of certain services to the community. The chair of the LSD committee is Terry Hynes.

== See also ==
- List of communities in Newfoundland and Labrador
- List of designated places in Newfoundland and Labrador
- List of local service districts in Newfoundland and Labrador
