= J.T. Cheeseman Provincial Park =

Provincial park in Canada

Coordinates: 47.632°N 59.254°W

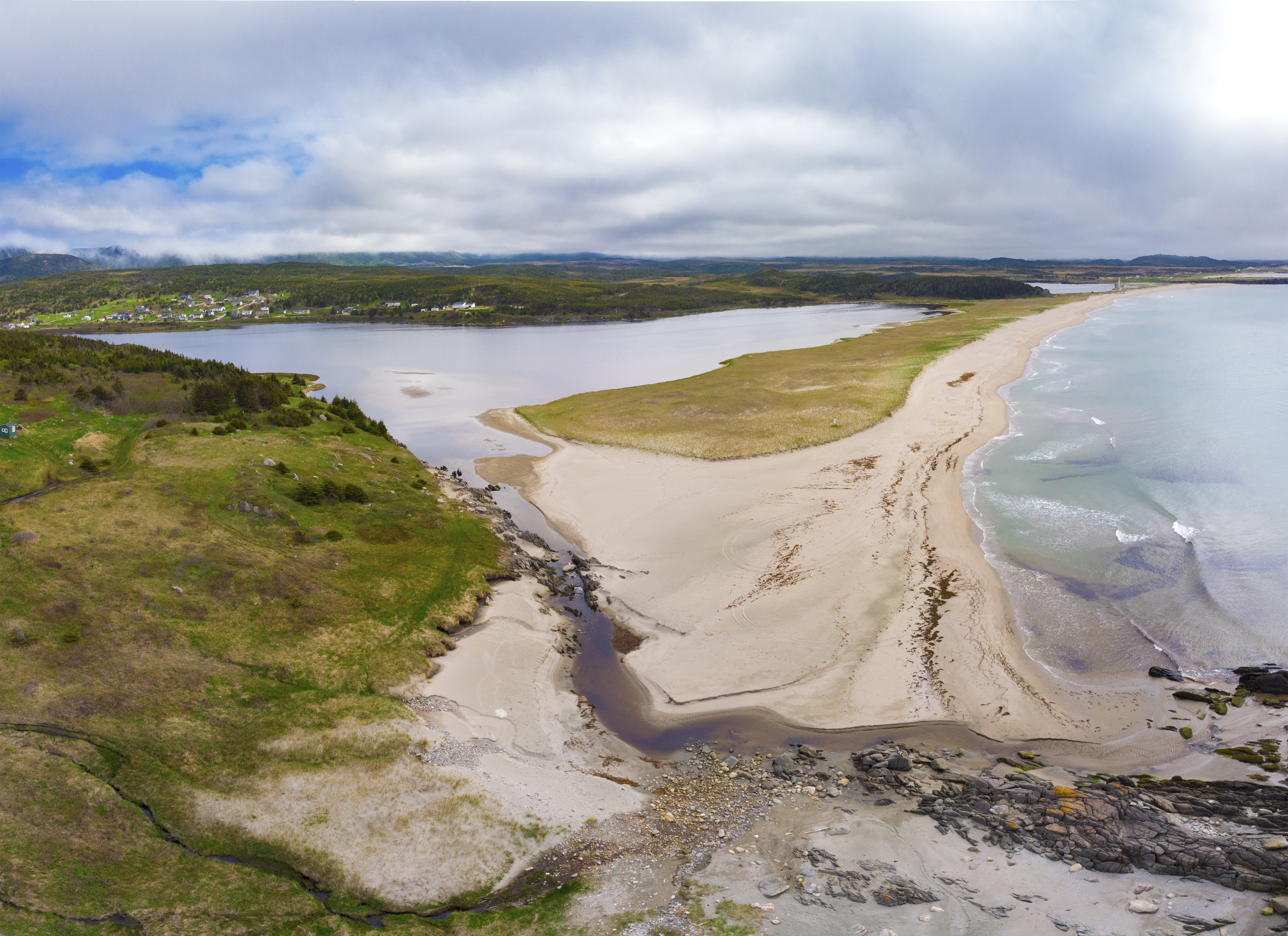
Beach at J.T. Cheeseman Provincial Park

J.T. Cheeseman Provincial Park in Newfoundland and Labrador

J.T. Cheeseman Provincial Park, is a provincial park near Channel-Port aux Basques, Newfoundland and Labrador. It is named after businessman and politician John T. Cheeseman.

== See also ==
- List of Newfoundland and Labrador parks
- List of Canadian provincial parks
