= Northwest Arm =

Northwest Arm or North West Arm may refer to:

- Northwest Arm (Halifax)
- Northwest Arm (Random Island)
- North West Arm, Newfoundland
- North West Arm, Nova Scotia
