= Brigus Junction =

Settlement in Newfoundland and Labrador

Coordinates: 47.400°N 53.285°W

Location of Brigus Junction in Newfoundland and Labrador

Brigus Junction is a designated place in the Canadian province of Newfoundland and Labrador.

The community was mainly used as a railway junction for the Newfoundland Railway that split the mainline (St. John's - Port Aux Basques) and the Carbonear Branchline.

== Geography ==
Brigus Junction is in Newfoundland within Subdivision O of Division No. 1.

== Demographics ==
As a designated place in the 2016 Census of Population conducted by Statistics Canada, Brigus Junction recorded a population of 155 living in 75 of its 553 total private dwellings, a change of 28.1% from its 2011 population of 121. With a land area of 8.14 km^{2} (3.14 sq mi), it had a population density of 19.0/km^{2} (49.3/sq mi) in 2016.

== See also ==
- List of communities in Newfoundland and Labrador
- List of designated places in Newfoundland and Labrador
