= York Harbour =

Coordinates: 49.050°N 58.383°W

- Town
- Interactive map of York Harbour
- Country: Canada
- Province: Newfoundland and Labrador

Population (2021)
  - Total: 372
- Time zone: UTC-3:30 (Newfoundland Time)
  - Summer (DST): UTC-2:30 (Newfoundland Daylight)
- Area code: 709
- Highways: Route 450

York Harbour is a town in the Canadian province of Newfoundland and Labrador. The Post Office was established in 1960. The first Postmistress was Mrs. Stella Wheeler. The population was 372 in 2021. York Harbour is approximately 50km southwest of Corner Brook and neighbours Lark Harbour.

== Demographics ==
In the 2021 Census of Population conducted by Statistics Canada, York Harbour had a population of 372 living in 162 of its 244 total private dwellings, a change of 8.1% from its 2016 population of 344. With a land area of 13.88 km^{2} (5.36 sq mi), it had a population density of 26.8/km^{2} (69.4/sq mi) in 2021.

== See also ==
- List of communities in Newfoundland and Labrador
