= Southport, Newfoundland and Labrador =

Coordinates: 48°03′N 53°38′W

View of Southport

Southport is a community in the Canadian province of Newfoundland and Labrador. It is located on the southern side of the entrance to Trinity Bay's Southwest Arm, about 41 km southeast of Clarenville. It is part of the local service district and designated place of Caplin Cove-Southport.

== History ==
The early settlers were inshore fishing families, but the community also became involved in the Labrador fishery in the 1870s. Early residents traded most catches with merchants in Trinity and visiting trading schooners. By 1890 Henry Alcock of Harbour Grace had established a mercantile business at Southport and nearby Hickman's Harbour had become a local mercantile centre as well.

By 1956, when Southport received its first road connection with the province's highway system, the population of the community had peaked at approximately 225.

By this time, however, the Labrador fishery had died and most fishing was carried out in local waters for cod, turbot, mackerel, herring, capelin and lobster. All cod landings were salted and dried on community flakes for marketing before the mid-1950s at which time fishermen increasingly began selling their catches fresh to local merchants and outside buyers. By this date Southport had become one of the principal centres in Newfoundland for the production of salted or pickled turbot and was a significant mackerel bar seine fishing centre with much of the pickled mackerel product being sold to West Indian markets. Its large output of pickled turbot was sold primarily in the lumber camps of Newfoundland, the Maritimes, Quebec and Maine. In the early 1960s a number of Southport fishermen were amongst the pioneers in the expansion of the groundfish longliner/gillnetter vessel fishery and constructed their own 45'vessels at Southport and also helped pioneer the development of the groundfish gillnet and purse seine pelagic fishery along the province's east/northeast coast for species such as cod, turbot, flounder, capelin, herring and mackerel. By 1992, when the northern cod moratorium was implemented, larger vessels dominated the Southport fishing industry but smaller inshore vessels were still being deployed by some fishing crews. Several of these larger vessels were also venturing as far as the Grand Banks for cod, crab and tuna in the post 1985 period. In the post 1970 period Southport Fish Products and Clarenville Ocean Products operated a multi-species processing/buying facility in the community.

After 1970 a number of Southport families erected homes on the road between Southport and Gooseberry Cove. As of 2020, there are less than 50 permanent residents in the community. Heart's Ease Beach Trail, located near the settlement, is quickly becoming a favorite hiking spot.
