= Deep Bight, Newfoundland and Labrador =

Local service district and designated place in Newfoundland and Labrador, Canada

Coordinates: 48°05′37″N 53°56′43″W

Deep Bight is a local service district and designated place in the Canadian province of Newfoundland and Labrador. It is south of Clarenville. It became a post office on April 1, 1949, and was still active by 1966.

== Geography ==
Deep Bight is in Newfoundland within Subdivision M of Division No. 7.

== Demographics ==
As a designated place in the 2016 Census of Population conducted by Statistics Canada, Deep Bight recorded a population of 186 living in 89 of its 101 total private dwellings, a change of 5.7% from its 2011 population of 176. With a land area of 15.35 km^{2} (5.93 sq mi), it had a population density of 12.1/km^{2} (31.4/sq mi) in 2016.

== Government ==
Deep Bight is a local service district (LSD) that is governed by a committee responsible for the provision of certain services to the community. The chair of the LSD committee is Darrell Payne.

== See also ==
- List of communities in Newfoundland and Labrador
- List of designated places in Newfoundland and Labrador
- List of local service districts in Newfoundland and Labrador
