= Long Beach, Newfoundland and Labrador =

Settlement in Newfoundland and Labrador, Canada

Long Beach
- Settlement
- Interactive map of Long Beach
- Coordinates: 47°59′47″N 53°48′59″W
- Country: Canada
- Province: Newfoundland and Labrador
- Time zone: UTC−3:30 (NST)
  - Summer (DST): UTC−2:30 (NDT)

Long Beach is a settlement in the Canadian province of Newfoundland and Labrador, located south east of Clarenville in Trinity Bay on the island of Newfoundland. Long Beach was the last recorded community in Southwest Arm to be settled, in 1865, when settlers came to live there from Grates Cove. The Post office first opened in 1889 and the first Postmaster was M.H. Vey. Some of the surnames that were residents of Long Beach were: Abbott, Fry, Harris, King, Vey, Barfitt and Quinton.

== See also ==
- List of communities in Newfoundland and Labrador
