= North West Brook - Ivany's Cove =

Community in Newfoundland and Labrador, Canada

North West Brook – Ivany’s Cove
- Unincorporated community
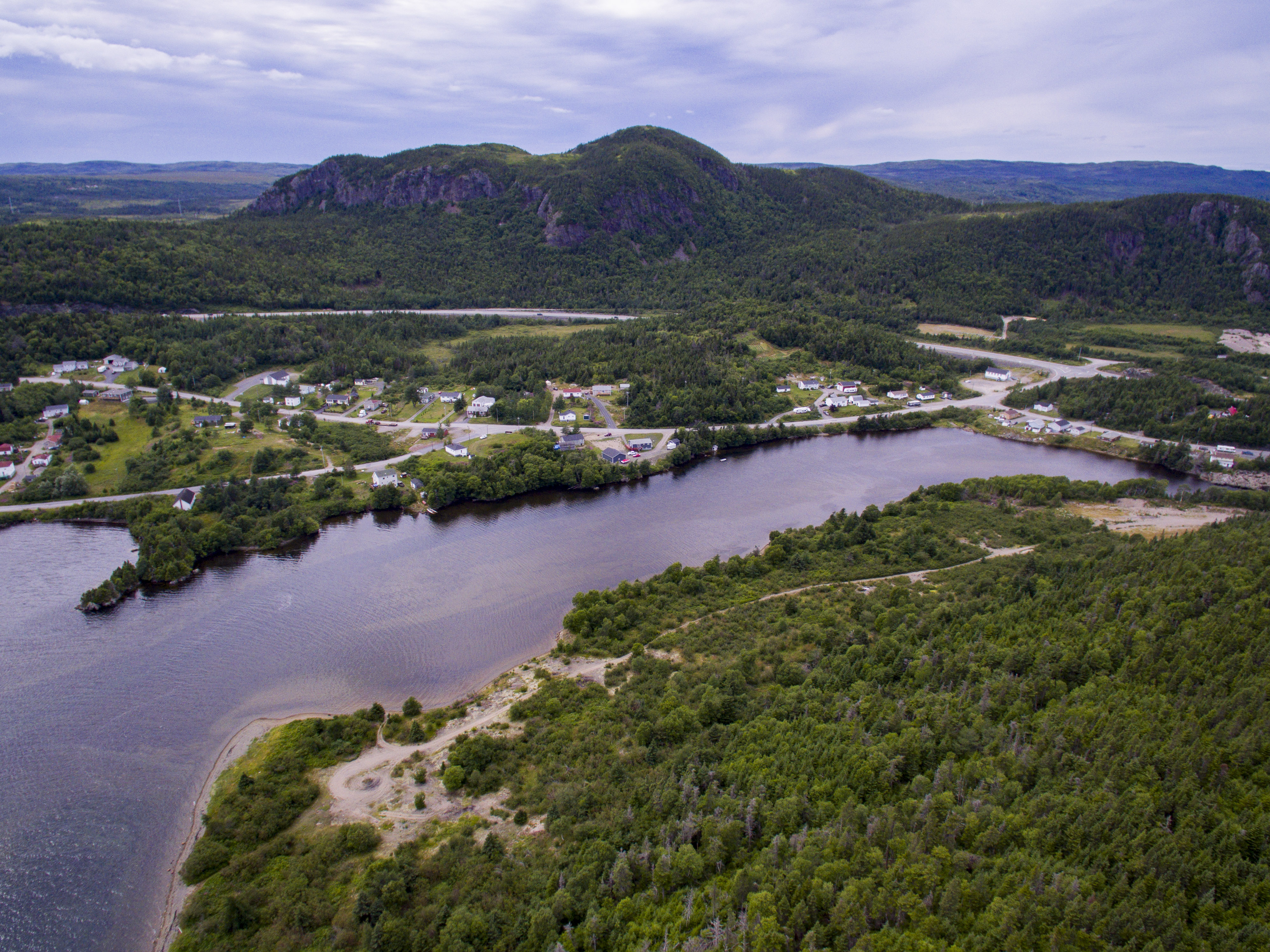
- The community of North West Brook, Newfoundland
- Interactive map of North West Brook – Ivany’s Cove
- Country: Canada
- Province: Newfoundland and Labrador
- Time zone: UTC−3:30 (Newfoundland Time)
  - Summer (DST): UTC−2:30 (Newfoundland Daylight Time)
- Area code: 709

North West Brook - Ivany's Cove is an unincorporated community located in Trinity Bay in Newfoundland and Labrador, on the Southern Shore of the Southwest Arm.
