= Butter Cove, Newfoundland and Labrador =

Coordinates: 48.026°N 53.648°W

Location of Butter Cove in Newfoundland and Labrador

Butter Cove is a small community in Trinity Bay, Newfoundland and Labrador. The community is between Little Heart's Ease and Gooseberry Cove.

The history of Butter Cove can be dated back to 1845. According to records, Moses and Honor Spurrell, along with their children, were the first to settle in the little community.

It is also known as Ganny Cove.
