= Glenwood, Newfoundland and Labrador =

Glenwood
- Town
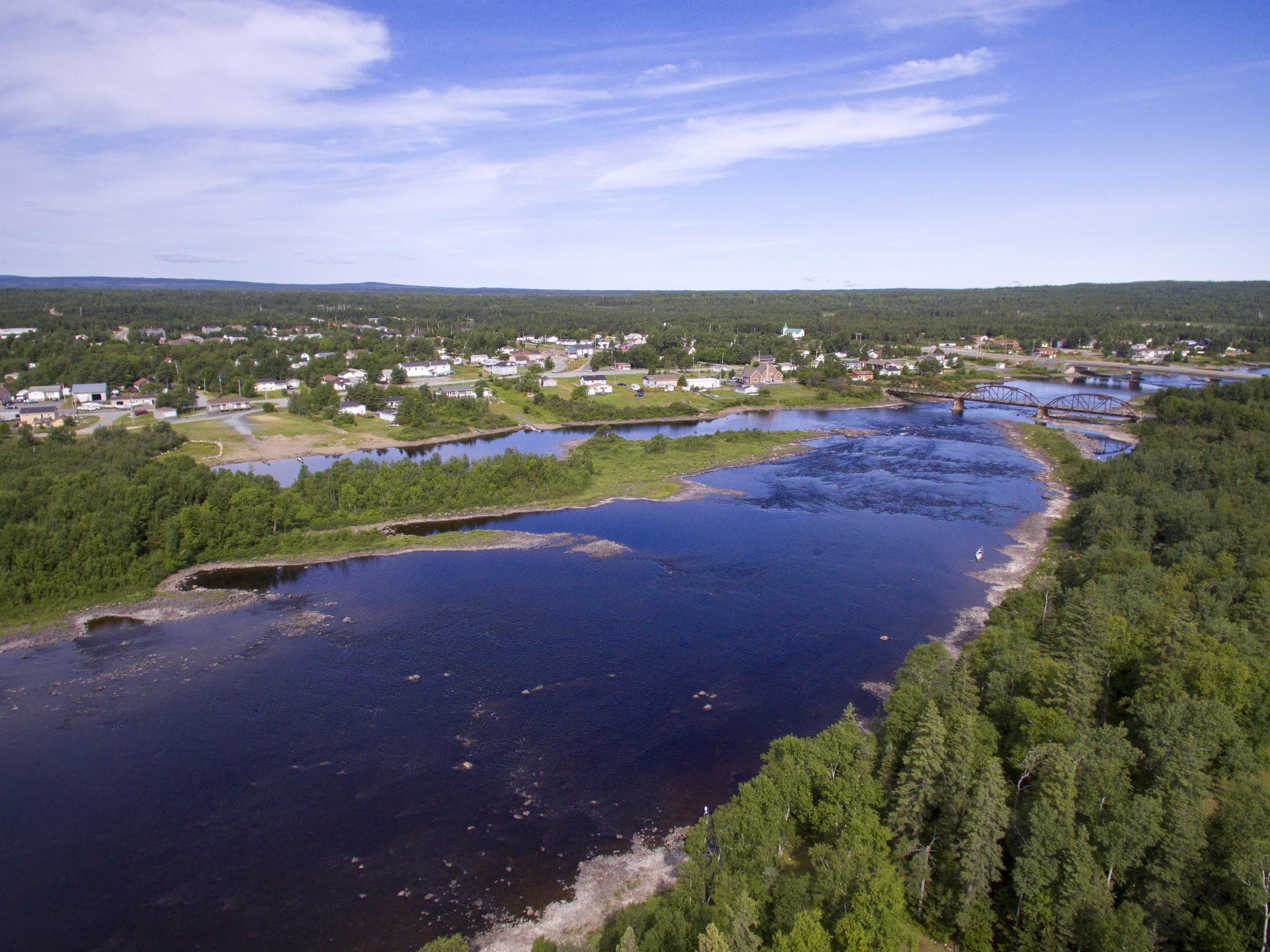

- Seal

- Location of Glenwood in Newfoundland
- Coordinates: 49.000°N 54.883°W
- Country: Canada
- Province: Newfoundland and Labrador
- Census division: 6

Area
  - Total: 6.92 km^{2} (2.67 sq mi)

Population (2021)
  - Total: 739
  - Density: 107/km^{2} (277/sq mi)
- Time zone: UTC-3:30 (Newfoundland Time)
  - Summer (DST): UTC-2:30 (Newfoundland Daylight)
- Area code: 709
- Highways: Route 1 (TCH)

Glenwood is a town in northeastern Newfoundland, Newfoundland and Labrador, Canada. It is in Division No. 6 on Gander Lake.

== Demographics ==
In the 2021 Census of Population conducted by Statistics Canada, Glenwood had a population of 739 living in 327 of its 361 total private dwellings, a change of −5% from its 2016 population of 778. With a land area of 7.08 km^{2} (2.73 sq mi), it had a population density of 104.4/km^{2} (270.3/sq mi) in 2021.

== See also ==
- List of cities and towns in Newfoundland and Labrador
