= Lark Harbour =

- Town
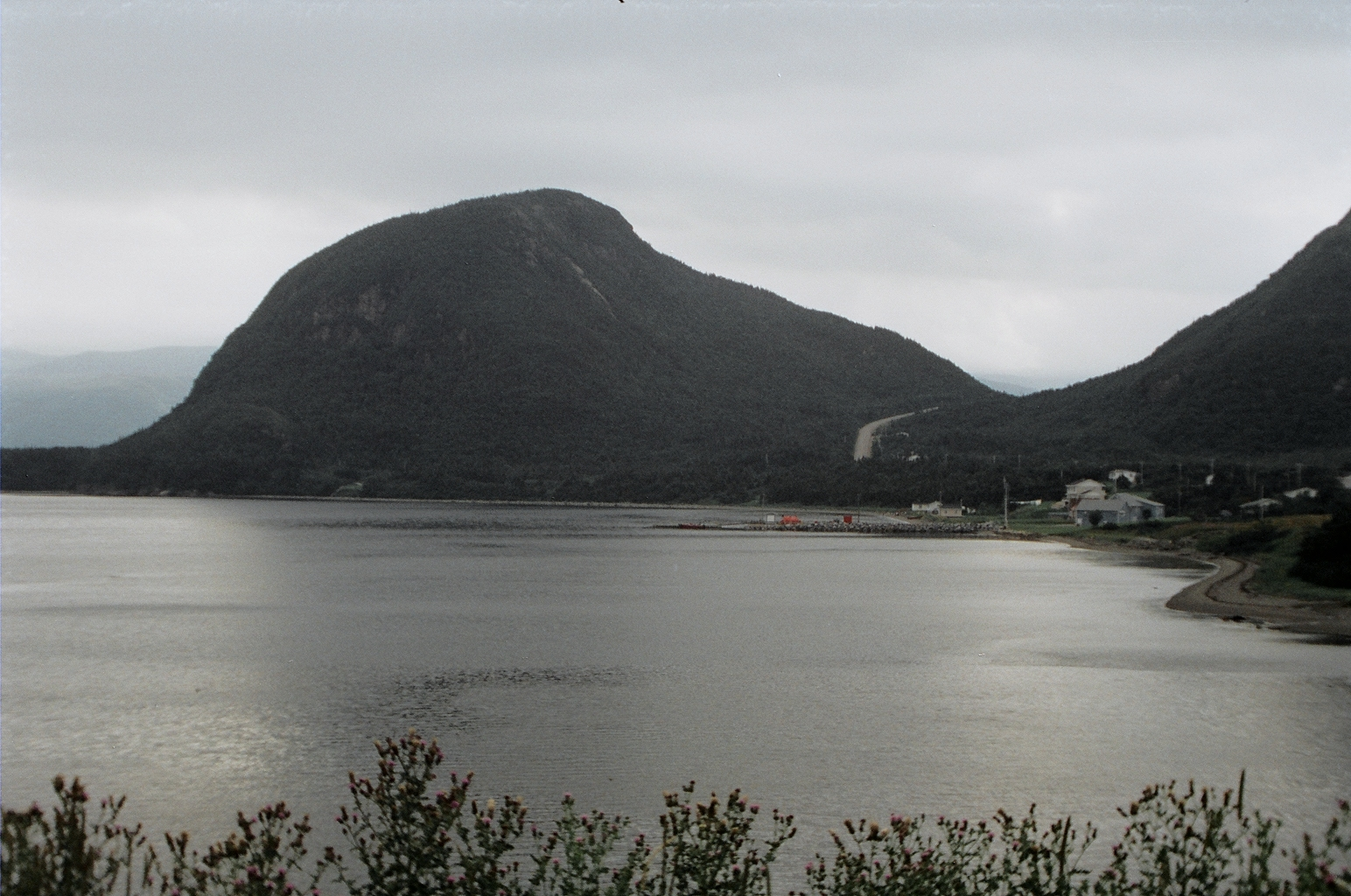
- Lark Harbour (showing promontory in Blow Me Down Provincial Park)

- Location of Lark Harbour in Newfoundland
- Coordinates: 49°06′N 58°22′W
- Country: Canada
- Province: Newfoundland and Labrador

Population (2021)
  - Total: 508
- Time zone: UTC-3:30 (Newfoundland Time)
  - Summer (DST): UTC-2:30 (Newfoundland Daylight)
- Area code: 709
- Highways: Route 450
- Current lighthouse
- Constructed: 2010
- Foundation: concrete base
- Construction: fiberglass tower
- Shape: cylindrical tower with light
- Markings: White (tower), Stripe (2, red, horizontal orientation)
- Operator: Canadian Coast Guard
- Focal height: 35 m (115 ft)
- Range: 6 nmi (11 km; 6.9 mi)
- Characteristic: Fl W 4s
- Second lighthouse
- Constructed: 1950
- Foundation: concrete base
- Construction: concrete tower
- Height: 10 m (33 ft)
- Shape: hexagonal frustum tower with balcony and lantern
- Markings: White (tower), red (lantern)
- Deactivated: 2010
- First lighthouse
- Constructed: 1925
- Foundation: concrete base
- Construction: wooden tower
- Height: 6 m (20 ft)
- Deactivated: 1950
- Focal height: 35 m (115 ft)

Lark Harbour is small fishing community on the western coast of Newfoundland, on the south side of the Bay of Islands, and west of the City of Corner Brook.

Combined with neighbouring York Harbour, there is a population of about 880. Blow Me Down Provincial Park lies on the boundary between the two communities.

Lark Harbour is approximately 50 km southwest of Corner Brook.

== Demographics ==
In the 2021 Census of Population conducted by Statistics Canada, Lark Harbour had a population of 508 living in 221 of its 290 total private dwellings, a change of −2.7% from its 2016 population of 522. With a land area of 12.94 km^{2} (5.00 sq mi), it had a population density of 39.3/km^{2} (101.7/sq mi) in 2021.

== See also ==
- List of lighthouses in Canada
