= Northwest Brook-Ivany's Cove-Queens Cove, Newfoundland and Labrador =

Northwest Brook-Ivany's Cove-Queens Cove
- Designated place
- Location of Northwest Brook-Ivany's Cove-Queens Cove Northwest Brook-Ivany's Cove-Queens Cove (Canada)
- Coordinates: 48.018°N 53.949°W
- Country: Canada
- Province: Newfoundland and Labrador
- Region: Newfoundland
- Census division: 7
- Census subdivision: M

Government
  - Type: Unincorporated

Area
  - Land: 13.31 km^{2} (5.14 sq mi)

Population (2016)
  - Total: 391
- Time zone: UTC−03:30 (NST)
  - Summer (DST): UTC−02:30 (NDT)
- Area code: 709

Northwest Brook-Ivany's Cove-Queens Cove is a designated place in the Canadian province of Newfoundland and Labrador. These communities is unincorporated. These communities is a local service district (LSD) that is governed by a committee responsible for the provision of certain services to the community.

== Geography ==
Northwest Brook-Ivany's Cove-Queens Cove is in Newfoundland within Subdivision M of Division No. 7.

== Demographics ==
As a designated place in the 2016 Census of Population conducted by Statistics Canada, Northwest Brook-Ivany's Cove-Queens Cove recorded a population of 391 living in 162 of its 193 total private dwellings, a change of 2.9% from its 2011 population of 380. With a land area of 13.31 km^{2} (5.14 sq mi), it had a population density of 29.4/km^{2} (76.1/sq mi) in 2016.

== See also ==
- List of communities in Newfoundland and Labrador
- List of designated places in Newfoundland and Labrador
- Royal eponyms in Canada
