= Hodge's Cove =

Human settlement in Newfoundland and Labrador, Canada

Hodge's Cove is a local service district and designated place in the Canadian province of Newfoundland and Labrador. It is southeast of Clarenville. Hodge's Cove was settled in 1861 and was first referred to as Hodge's Hole. It is not known for sure, but the settlement's name may have come from visitors who made short trips to the area to cut wood. As early as the 1840s, fisherman from Grates Cove in Trinity Bay came to Southwest Arm looking for wood. The way office was established in 1884 and the first way master was James Drover. It had a population of 261 in 2016.

== Geography ==
Hodges Cove is located on the southern shoreline of Southwest Arm in a valley with the surrounding hills rising to an elevation of 150 meters. The community features three pebble beaches and two islands locally known as "The little island", which can be accessed by foot at low tide. and "The big island". In the middle of the community contains Hodge's Cove pond, a shallow tidal pond in which its mudflats are a popular spot for birds, especially Canada geese.

== Demographics ==
As a designated place in the 2016 Census of Population conducted by Statistics Canada, Hodges Cove recorded a population of 261 living in 119 of its 151 total private dwellings, a change of -5.1% from its 2011 population of 275. With a land area of 6.03 km^{2} (2.33 sq mi), it had a population density of 43.3/km^{2} (112.1/sq mi) in 2016.

== Government ==
Hodges Cove is a local service district (LSD) that is governed by a committee responsible for the provision of certain services to the community. The chair of the LSD committee is Cameron Martin.

== See also ==
- List of communities in Newfoundland and Labrador
- List of designated places in Newfoundland and Labrador
- List of local service districts in Newfoundland and Labrador
