= St. Jones Within =

Small settlement in Newfoundland, Canada

Coordinates: 48°02′39″N 53°45′10″W

St. Jones Within is located in Trinity Bay, Newfoundland and Labrador. It takes approximately two hours to drive there from the province's capital city, St. John's. Most of the houses in the community are built around the sheltered harbour.

== Population ==
In 2001 St. Jones Within had a population of 94.

See: 1921 Census, 1935 Census, 1945 Census, and Cemetery Data.

== Religion ==
St. Jones Within has one United church. The minister lives in the nearby community of Hillview.

== Transportation ==
Travel to St. Jones Within can be via the Trans-Canada Highway at the Hillview exit, or by boat via Southwest Arm, Trinity Bay.
