= Little Heart's Ease, Newfoundland and Labrador =

Community in Newfoundland and Labrador, Canada

Coordinates: 48°01′N 53°41′W

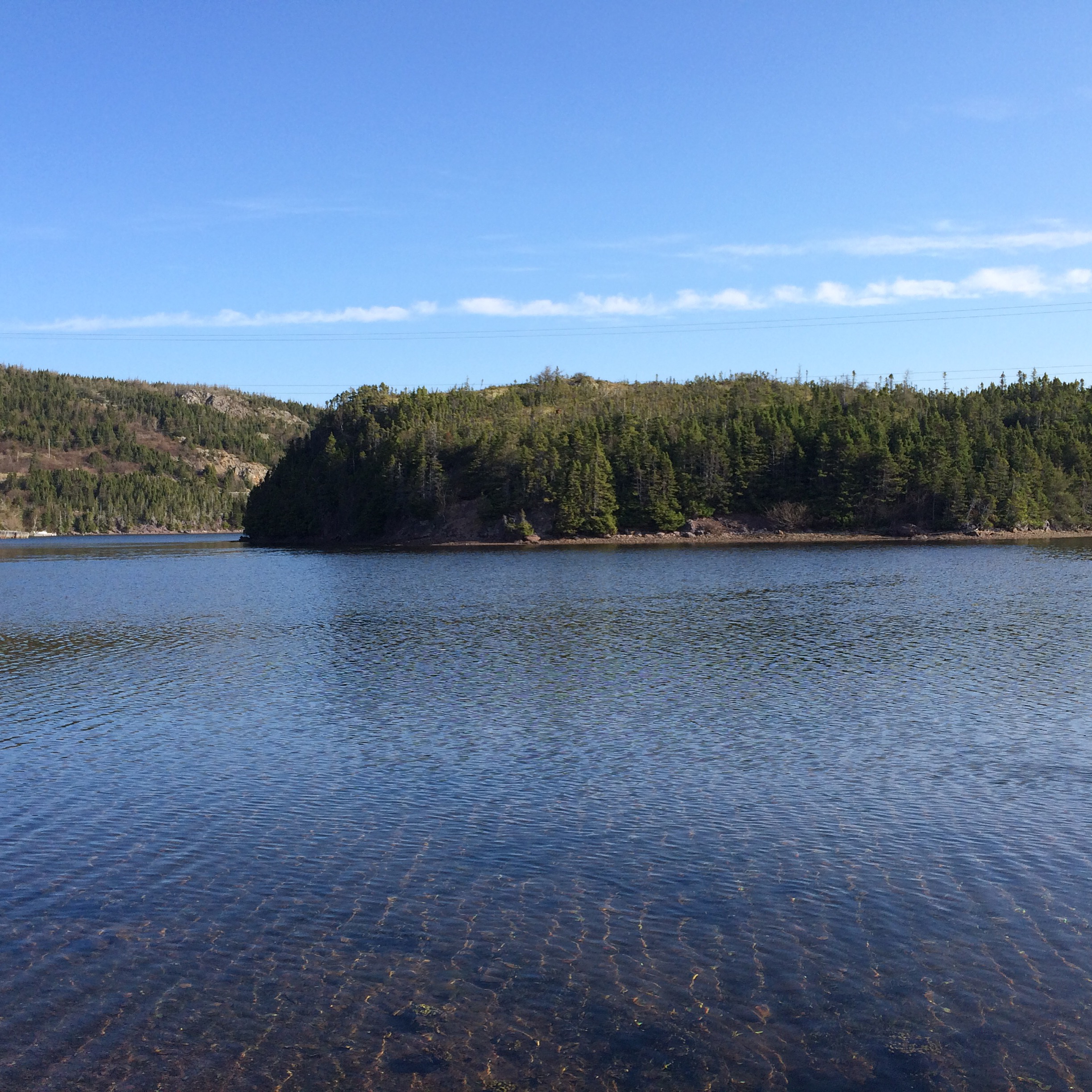
Nice Day in the Bay

Little Heart's Ease is a community on the Southwest Arm on the east coast of Newfoundland, southeast of Clarenville. The Post Office was established in 1893. The first Postmaster was Eli Martin. It had a population of 443 in 1996. About 1612 it was referred as "Hearts Ease" by Governor John Guy of Cupids, as did Sir Richard Whitbourne, Governor of Renews. It was known for its fishing activity and as a very secure harbour for schooners. Today long-liners and draggers still enjoy its protection.

== See also ==
- List of communities in Newfoundland and Labrador
- Southwest Arm
