= Newfoundland and Labrador Route 414 =

Highway in Newfoundland and Labrador, Canada

Route 414
- La Scie Highway

Route information
- Maintained by Newfoundland and Labrador Department of Transportation and Infrastructure
- Length: 52.8 km (32.8 mi)

Major junctions
- West end: Route 410 near Baie Verte
- Route 418 to Ming's Bight; Route 417 to Pacquet; Route 415 to Nipper's Harbour; Route 416 to Snook's Arm
- East end: La Scie

Location
- Country: Canada
- Province: Newfoundland and Labrador

Highway system
- Highways in Newfoundland and Labrador
← Route 413	→ Route 415

Route 414, also known as La Scie Highway, is a highway located on the Baie Verte Peninsula of Newfoundland in the Canadian province of Newfoundland and Labrador. Its western terminus is the intersection at Route 410, about 7 kilometres south of Baie Verte, and its eastern terminus is the Town of La Scie.

== Route description ==
Route 414 begins at an intersection with Route 410 (Dorset Trail) just south of Baie Verte. It heads eastward down the centre of the eastern half of the peninsula, having intersections with Route 418 (Ming's Bight Road), Route 417 (Pacquet Road), and Route 415 (Nipper's Harbour Road). The highway travels closer to the coastline as it has an intersection with a local roads leading to Harbour Round, Brent's Cove, Tilt Cove, Shoe Cove, as well as having an intersection with Route 416 (Round Harbour Road). Route 414 turns northward to have an intersection with Cape St. John Road, which provides access to the site of the historic La Scie Air Station, before entering the town limits of La Scie, where Route 414 comes to an end at an intersection with Water Street in Downtown.

== Major intersections ==
Location	km	mi	Destinations	Notes
	0.0	0.0	Route 410 (Dorset Trail) to Route 1 (TCH) – Baie Verte, Seal Cove	Western terminus
	12.2	7.6	Route 418 north (Ming's Bight Road) – Ming's Bight	Southern terminus of Route 418
	22.5	14.0	Route 417 north (Pacquet Road) – Pacquet, Woodstock	Southern terminus of Route 417
	35.2	21.9	Route 415 south (Nipper's Harbour Road) – Nipper's Harbour	Northern terminus of Route 415
	40.8	25.4	Route 416 south (Round Harbour Road) – Snook's Arm, Round Harbour, Baie Verte, Newfoundland and Labrador	Northern terminus of Route 416
	41.9	26.0	Brent's Cove Road (Route 414-10) - Brent's Cove, Harbour Round	
	46.7	29.0	Tilt Cove Road (Route 414-12) - Tilt Cove	
	49.8	30.9	Shoe Cove Road (Route 414-13) - Shoe Cove	
	51.5	32.0	Cape St. John Road (Route 414-14) - La Scie Air Station	
La Scie	52.8	32.8	Water Street	Eastern terminus
1.000 mi = 1.609 km; 1.000 km = 0.621 mi
