= Newfoundland and Labrador Route 410 =

Highway in Newfoundland and Labrador, Canada

Route 410
- Dorset Trail

Route information
- Maintained by Newfoundland and Labrador Department of Transportation and Infrastructure
- Length: 89.9 km (55.9 mi)

Major junctions
- South end: Route 1 (TCH) in Sheppardville
- Route 411 to Westport; Route 413 to Burlington; Route 414 to La Scie; Route 412 in Baie Verte
- North end: Dead End in Fleur de Lys

Location
- Country: Canada
- Province: Newfoundland and Labrador

Highway system
- Highways in Newfoundland and Labrador
← Route 408	→ Route 411

Route 410, also known as Dorset Trail, is an 89.9-kilometre-long (55.9 mi) north-south highway on the northern coast of Newfoundland in the Canadian province of Newfoundland and Labrador. It leads from Sheppardville, at Route 1 (Trans-Canada Highway), to a dead end in Fleur de Lys, Newfoundland and Labrador. Route 410 serves as the primary roadway access on-and-off the Baie Verte Peninsula. Baie Verte is the most populous community along the route.

In 2022, Route 410 was voted the Worst Road in Atlantic Canada by the Canadian Automobile Association's Worst Roads list.

== Route description ==
Route 410 begins in Sheppardville at an intersection with Route 1 (Trans-Canada Highway) and it heads north to cross the Indian River and wind its way through rural hilly terrain for several kilometres. The highway passes by Flatwater Pond Park to have intersections with Route 411 (Purbeck's Cove Road) and Route 413 (Burlington Road) before passing through more rural areas. Route 410 now has an intersection with Route 414 (La Scie Highway) before entering Baie Verte. It has an intersection with Route 412 (Seal Cove Road) before passing through neighbourhoods and downtown. The highway now leaves Baie Verte and winds its way through hilly terrain for the next several kilometres. Route 410 has a Y-Intersection with a local road leading to Coachman's Cove before entering Fleur de Lys, where Route 410 comes to a dead end after passing through town.

== Major intersections ==
Location	km	mi	Destinations	Notes
Sheppardville	0.0	0.0	Route 1 (TCH) – Deer Lake, Grand Falls-Windsor	Southern terminus
	40.1	24.9	Flatwater Pond Park main entrance	Access road into park
	44.0	27.3	Route 411 west (Purbeck's Cove Road) – Westport, Purbeck's Cove	Eastern terminus of Route 411
	45.2	28.1	Route 413 east (Burlington Road) – Burlington, Middle Arm	Western terminus of Route 413
	57.3	35.6	Route 414 east (La Scie Highway) – Ming's Bight, La Scie	Western terminus of Route 414
Baie Verte	59.3	36.8	Route 412 west (Seal Cove Road) – Wild Cove, Seal Cove	Eastern terminus of Route 412
	79.9	49.6	Coachman's Cove Road (Route 410-10) - Coachman's Cove	
Fleur de Lys	89.9	55.9	Dead End	Northern terminus
1.000 mi = 1.609 km; 1.000 km = 0.621 mi

== Attractions along Route 410 ==
- Flatwater Pond Park (former Provincial Park)

== See also ==
- List of Newfoundland and Labrador highways
