= Newfoundland and Labrador Route 416 =

Highway in Newfoundland and Labrador, Canada

Route 416
- Round Harbour Road

Route information
- Maintained by Newfoundland and Labrador Department of Transportation and Infrastructure
- Length: 9.5 km (5.9 mi)

Major junctions
- South end: Round Harbour
- North end: Route 414 near Brent's Cove

Location
- Country: Canada
- Province: Newfoundland and Labrador

Highway system
- Highways in Newfoundland and Labrador
| ← Route 415 | → Route 417 |

Route 416, also known as Round Harbour Road, is a short 9.5-kilometre-long (5.9 mi) north–south highway on the Baie Verte Peninsula of Newfoundland in the Canadian province of Newfoundland and Labrador. It connects the nearly abandoned community of Round Harbour, as well as the community of Snook's Arm before terminating at Route 414 (La Scie Highway) near the town of Brent's Cove. Route 416 is entirely a gravel two-lane roadway.

== Route description ==
Route 416 begins in Round Harbour at the harbour in the centre of town. It leaves the community and winds its way northwest through hilly terrain for a few kilometres to pass through Snook's Arm, where it makes a sharp right turn to the north at an intersection with a local road leading to downtown. The highway winds its way north through wooded areas for a few more kilometres before Route 416 comes to an end at an intersection with Route 414 just south of Brent's Cove.

== Major intersections ==
| Location | km | mi | Destinations | Notes |
|---|---|---|---|---|
| Round Harbour | 0.0 | 0.0 | Dead End at the town's harbour | Southern terminus |
| Snook's Arm | 4.2 | 2.6 | Snook's Arm Road (Route 416-10) - Downtown | |
| | 9.5 | 5.9 | Route 414 (La Scie Highway) to Route 1 (TCH) – La Scie, Seal Cove, Baie Verte | Northern terminus |
1.000 mi = 1.609 km; 1.000 km = 0.621 mi
