= Newfoundland and Labrador Route 417 =

Highway in Newfoundland and Labrador

Route 417
- Pacquet Road

Route information
- Maintained by Newfoundland and Labrador Department of Transportation and Infrastructure
- Length: 11.3 km (7.0 mi)

Major junctions
- South end: Route 414 near Woodstock
- North end: Pacquet

Location
- Country: Canada
- Province: Newfoundland and Labrador

Highway system
- Highways in Newfoundland and Labrador
← Route 416	→ Route 418

Route 417, also known as Pacquet Road, is a short 11.3-kilometre-long (7.0 mi) north–south highway on the Baie Verte Peninsula of Newfoundland in the Canadian Province of Newfoundland and Labrador. It connects the towns of Pacquet and Woodstock with Route 414 (La Scie Highway).

== Route description ==
Route 417 begins at an intersection with Route 414 and it heads north through rural wooded areas for a few kilometres. It now passes through Woodstock, where it makes a sharp left to follow along the waters edge just west of downtown, before winding its way through hilly terrain for a few more kilometres. The highway now enters Pacquet, where it winds its way through town before coming to a dead end in a neighbourhood.

== Major intersections ==
Location	km	mi	Destinations	Notes
	0.0	0.0	Route 414 (La Scie Highway) to Route 1 (TCH) – La Scie, Baie Verte, Fleur de Lys	Southern terminus
Woodstock	6.4	4.0	Main Street (Route 417-10) - Downtown	
Pacquet	11.3	7.0	Dead End	Northern terminus
1.000 mi = 1.609 km; 1.000 km = 0.621 mi
