= Newfoundland and Labrador Route 411 =

Highway in Newfoundland and Labrador, Canada

Route 411
- Purbeck's Cove Road

Route information
- Maintained by Newfoundland and Labrador Department of Transportation and Infrastructure
- Length: 27.7 km (17.2 mi)

Major junctions
- West end: Westport
- East end: Route 410 near Baie Verte

Location
- Country: Canada
- Province: Newfoundland and Labrador

Highway system
- Highways in Newfoundland and Labrador
← Route 410	→ Route 412

Route 411, also known as Purbeck's Cove Road, is a 27.7-kilometre-long (17.2 mi) east–west highway on the Baie Verte Peninsula of Newfoundland in the Canadian province of Newfoundland and Labrador. It connects the town of Westport, along with the community of Purbeck's Cove, with Route 410 (Dorset Trail), serving as the only road access to these aforementioned settlements.

== Route description ==
Route 411 begins at a fork in the road along the coast of White Bay in downtown Westport. It heads northeast to have an intersection with a short, narrow, winding gravel road that leads to Purbeck's Cove further to the south. The highway now leaves town and winds its way east through rural areas for several kilometres, where it passes through Western Arm and has an intersection with a local road leading to Bear Cove, before coming to an end at an intersection with Route 410 between Sheppardville and Baie Verte, just north of Flatwater Pond Park.

== Major intersections ==
Location	km	mi	Destinations	Notes
Westport	0.0	0.0	Fork in the road in downtown	Western terminus
Westport	1.0	0.62	Purbeck's Cove Road - Purbeck's Cove	
	16.8	10.4	Bear Cove Road, Newfoundland and Labrador Route 411-11 - Bear Cove, White Bay, Newfoundland and Labrador	
	27.7	17.2	Route 410 (Dorset Trail) to Route 1 (TCH) – Baie Verte, La Scie	Eastern terminus
1.000 mi = 1.609 km; 1.000 km = 0.621 mi
