= Burlington, Newfoundland and Labrador =

Burlington
- Town
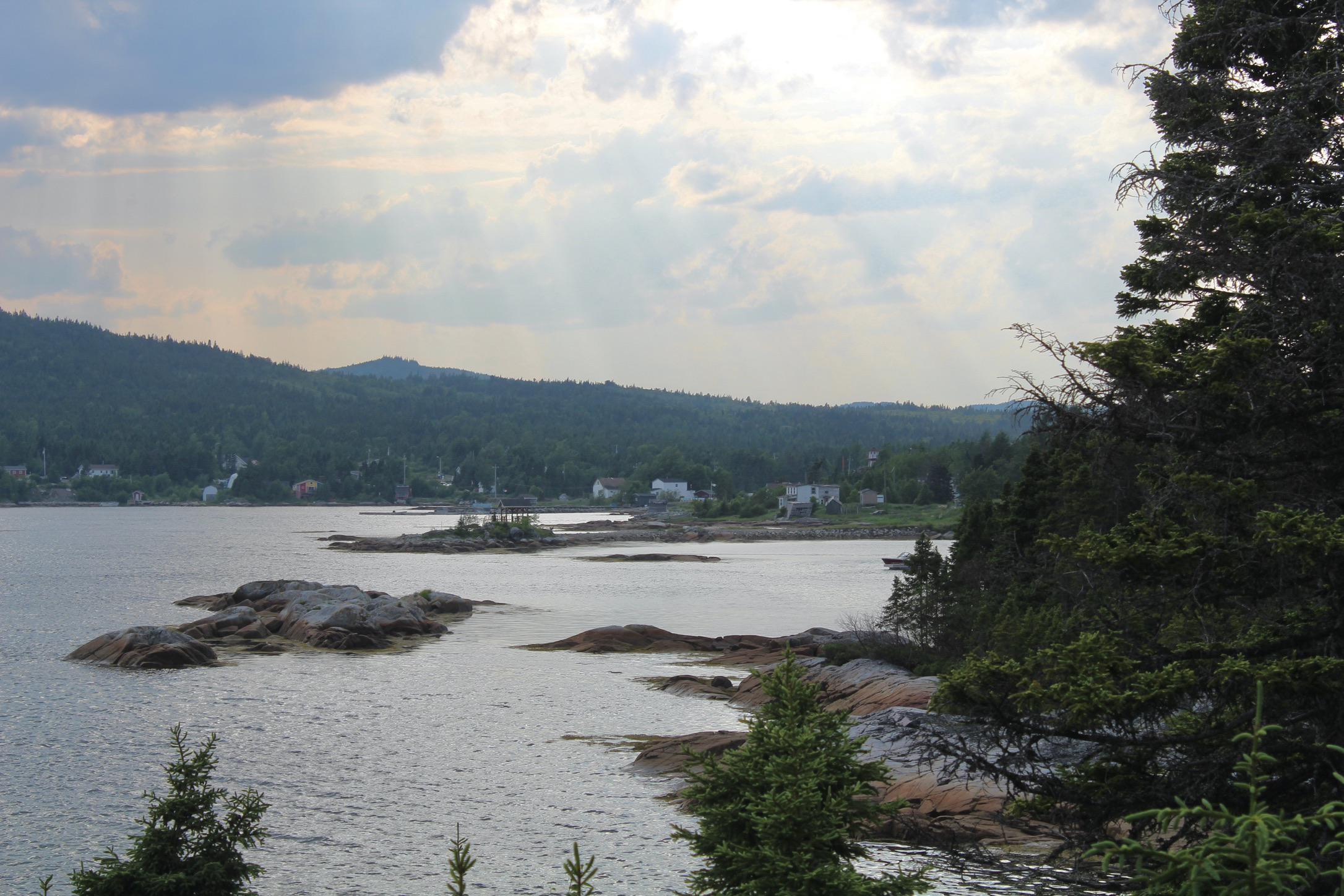
- Green Bay in Burlington

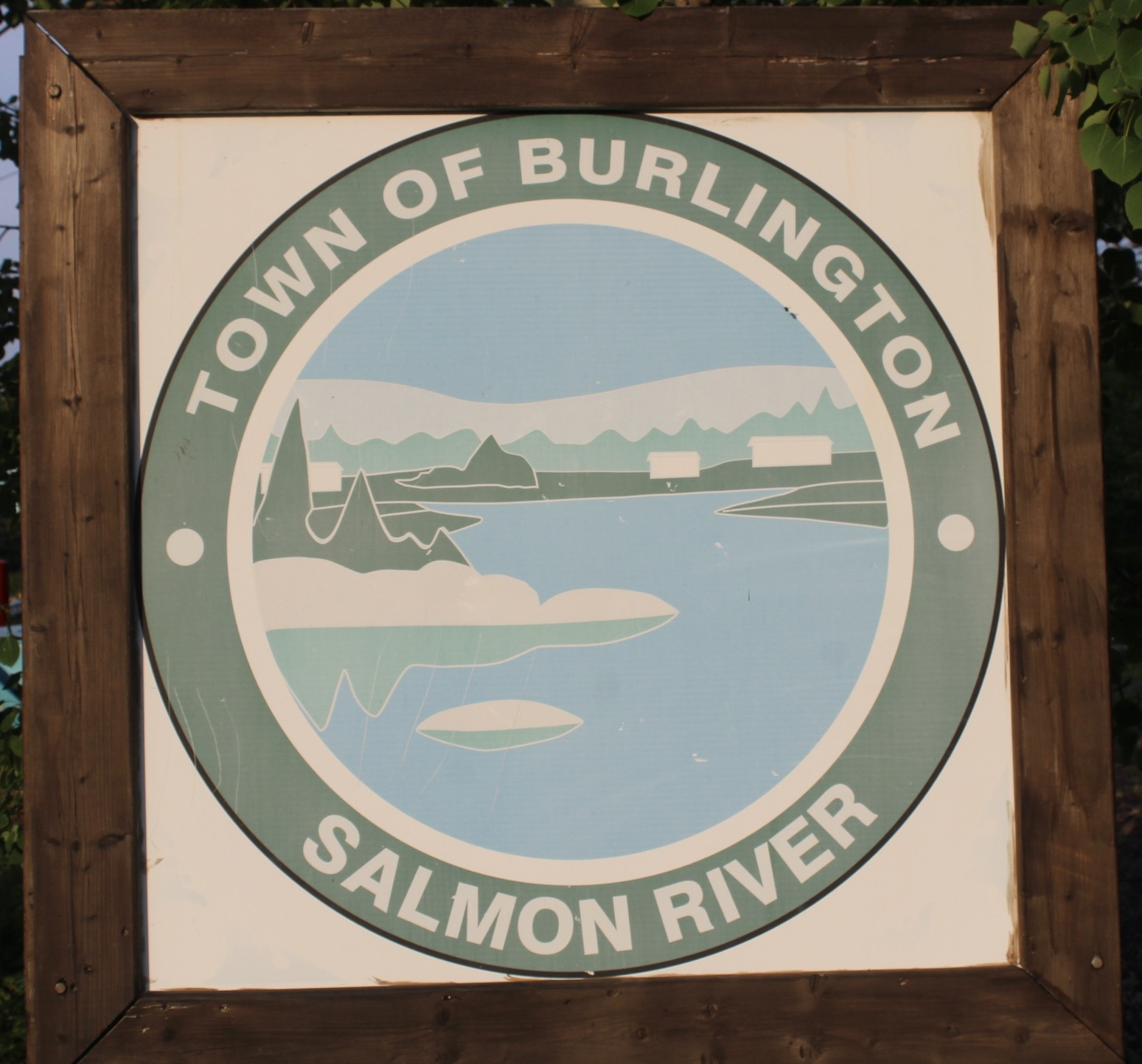
- Seal

- Location in Newfoundland and Labrador
- Coordinates: 49°45′01″N 56°01′03″W
- Country: Canada
- Province: Newfoundland and Labrador

Government
  - Mayor: Rudy Norman

Area
  - Total: 4.11 km^{2} (1.59 sq mi)
- Elevation: 3 m (9.8 ft)

Population (2021)
  - Total: 304
  - Density: 74.0/km^{2} (192/sq mi)
- Time zone: UTC-3:30 (Newfoundland Time)
  - Summer (DST): UTC-2:30 (Newfoundland Time)
- Postal Code: A0K 1S0
- Area code: Area code 709
- Highways: Route 413
- Website: townofburlington.ca

Burlington is an incorporated town in Newfoundland and Labrador, Canada. It is a small fishing and lumbering community on Route 413 at the north side of the mouth of Green Bay. Burlington is located approximately 40 km from Baie Verte.

== History ==
Burlington was once named Northwest Arm, and was permanently settled in the mid-19th century. The community was renamed in the early part of 1915 due to a mix-up in the mail service. After many residents complained that their mail was sent to another community with a similar name, the town leaders felt the need to have a name change. Out of three separate entries, 'Burlington' was chosen.

There was no large industry in the 19th century. The early settlers fished for cod and cleared land to grow potatoes, cabbage and small fruits. Keeping animals provided meat for the winter and milk and butter in season. Settlers built their own boats for fishing in Labrador, or they were employed by the inshore fishery. When mines opened at both Bett's Cove and Tilt Cove, some of the Burlington men went to both communities for work.

Logging pitprops for the United Kingdom were started in 1915 by a contractor named John Jennings. This industry was closed in 1918 when the sale of pitprops ended. Lumber camps opened in 1920, but closed during the Depression of the 1930s. In 1935, the Thistle family started cutting export wood. They remained a major economic force in Burlington for approximately 30 years. Camps later opened for the cutting of pulpwood and continued for about ten years. In 1969 pulpwood was again the main industry, shipped out by truck from Burlington.

== Language ==
According to the 2021 census, 100% of Burlington's population speaks English, with the census also stating that 100% of the population only know how to speak English. Burlington and surrounding area has a distinct dialect that is still heard by many today, because of its English and Irish heritage.

== Demographics ==
Population trend
Year	Pop.	±%
1996	432	—
2001	409	−5.3%
2006	376	−8.1%
2011	349	−7.2%
2016	314	−10.0%
2021	304	−3.2%

In the 2021 Census of Population conducted by Statistics Canada, Burlington had a population of 304 living in 119 of its 135 total private dwellings, a change of −3.2% from its 2016 population of 314. With a land area of 4.09 km^{2} (1.58 sq mi), it had a population density of 74.3/km^{2} (192.5/sq mi) in 2021.

Canada census – Burlington community profile

	2021	2016	2011
Population	304 (-3.2% from 2016)	314 (-10.0% from 2011)	349 (-7.2% from 2006)
Land area	4.09 km^{2} (1.58 sq mi)	4.1 km^{2} (1.6 sq mi)	4.1 km^{2} (1.6 sq mi)
Population density	74.3/km^{2} (192/sq mi)	76.7/km^{2} (199/sq mi)	85.2/km^{2} (221/sq mi)
Median age	52.0 (M: 53.2, F: 51.2)	43.2 (M: 43.4, F: 43.0)	43.6 (M: 44.4, F: 42.3)
Private dwellings	135 (total) 119 (occupied)	120 (total)	137 (total)
Median household income	$76,500

References: 2021 2016 2011

== Notable residents ==
- Rex Goudie
- Shaun Majumder

== Towns and communities nearby ==
- Middle Arm
- Smith's Harbour
- Baie Verte
- Springdale
- Kings Island

== See also ==
- Baie Verte Peninsula
- List of cities and towns in Newfoundland and Labrador
