= Newfoundland and Labrador Route 418 =

Road in Newfoundland and Labrador, Canada

Route 418
- Ming's Bight Road

Route information
- Maintained by Newfoundland and Labrador Department of Transportation and Infrastructure
- Length: 9.2 km (5.7 mi)

Major junctions
- South end: Route 414 near Baie Verte
- North end: Ming's Bight

Location
- Country: Canada
- Province: Newfoundland and Labrador

Highway system
- Highways in Newfoundland and Labrador
← Route 417	→ Route 419

Route 418, also known as Ming's Bight Road, is a short 9.2-kilometre-long (5.7 mi) north–south highway on the Baie Verte Peninsula of Newfoundland in the Canadian province of Newfoundland and Labrador. It connects the town of Ming's Bight with Route 414 (La Scie Highway), which in turn connects it with La Scie and Baie Verte. The entire length of Route 418 is a rural two-lane highway, with no other major intersections or communities of any kind along the highway.

== Major intersections ==
Location	km	mi	Destinations	Notes
	0.0	0.0	Route 414 (La Scie Highway) to Route 1 (TCH) – La Scie, Baie Verte, Fleur de Lys	Southern terminus
Ming's Bight	9.2	5.7	Main Street	Northern terminus
1.000 mi = 1.609 km; 1.000 km = 0.621 mi
