= Snook's Arm =

Human settlement in Canada

- Location of Snook's Arm in Newfoundland
- Coordinates: 49°53′10″N 55°37′37″W
- Country: Canada
- Province: Newfoundland and Labrador

Population (2016)
  - Total: 10
- Time zone: UTC-3:30 (Newfoundland Time)
  - Summer (DST): UTC-2:30 (Newfoundland Daylight)
- Area code: 709
- Highways: Route 416

Snook's Arm is a designated place in the Canadian province of Newfoundland and Labrador. The community was entirely resettled in 2018.

== History ==
The first homes at Snook's Arm were probably built by settlers of Twillingate, who had been using the nearby village of Round Harbour as a fishing outpost. Local tradition held that the first permanent settlers were John Foss and William Young; while Snook is a surname with some provenance in Newfoundland, there is no evidence that a family with that name had ever lived in the community. The community first appeared in census records in 1857.

An inshore fishing community for much of its existence, the Cabot Whaling Factory owned by Augustus W. Harvey opened a whaling factory there in the 1890s alongside another in Beaverton, and the village saw modest population growth before it closed by 1911. The residents were predominantly Methodist and the local church, built in the early 20th century, served as the community's school house until a separate building was completed in 1947. Following Confederation with Canada in 1949, Snook's Arm residents increasingly found employment at the fish plant in nearby La Scie, and students were eventually bused to a regional high school there by the 1970s. Prominent surnames included Austin and Osborne, both of which were families from Tilt Cove that had moved during a downturn in mining activity, and Foote, which had earlier been present in the abandoned village of Venom's Bight.

Although connected to the Trans-Canada Highway via Route 416, the road was rarely open during the winter, and the community never had a population exceeding 100. The 1992 collapse of the Atlantic cod fishery dealt a fatal blow to the village's economy. On November 14, 2017, Snook's Arm was approved for relocation by the provincial government, with Minister of Municipal Affairs Brian Warr citing the difficulties of living in the area during the winter as a primary motivation for the residents in initiating resettlement procedures.

Snook's Arm serves as the primary setting of Netflix's limited series Below.

== Geography ==
Snook's Arm is on the Eastern side of the Baie Verte Peninsula in Newfoundland within Subdivision O of Division No. 8.

== Demographics ==
As a designated place in the 2016 Census of Population conducted by Statistics Canada, Snook's Arm recorded a population of 10 living in 5 of its 14 total private dwellings, a change of −44.4% from its 2011 population of 18. With a land area of 0.82 km^{2} (0.32 sq mi), it had a population density of 12.2/km^{2} (31.6/sq mi) in 2016.

== See also ==
- Baie Verte Peninsula
- List of designated places in Newfoundland and Labrador
- Resettlement (Newfoundland)
