= Newfoundland and Labrador Route 413 =

Highway in Newfoundland and Labrador, Canada

Route 413

Route information
- Maintained by Newfoundland and Labrador Department of Transportation and Infrastructure
- Length: 31.1 km (19.3 mi)

Major junctions
- West end: Route 410 13 km south of Baie Verte
- East end: Main Street in Middle Arm

Location
- Country: Canada
- Province: Newfoundland and Labrador

Highway system
- Highways in Newfoundland and Labrador
← Route 412	→ Route 414

Route 413 is a highway on the Baie Verte Peninsula of Newfoundland in the Canadian province of Newfoundland and Labrador. It is a short route, running from a junction at Route 410 (Dorset Trail) and ending at its eastern terminus at Middle Arm.

== Route description ==
Route 413 begins at an intersection with Route 410 south of Baie Verte and it heads east through rural wooded areas for several kilometres. It passes through Burlington, where it has an intersection with a local road leading to Smith's Harbour, before winding its way south along the coastline of Notre Dame Bay to enter Middle Arm, where it comes to an end at an intersection with Main Street in downtown.

== Major intersections ==
Location	km	mi	Destinations	Notes
	0.0	0.0	Route 410 (Dorset Trail) to Route 1 (TCH) – Baie Verte, Fleur de Lys	Western terminus
Burlington	23.3	14.5	Bridge Street (Route 413-10) - Smith's Harbour	
Middle Arm	31.1	19.3	Main Street	Eastern terminus
1.000 mi = 1.609 km; 1.000 km = 0.621 mi
