= Newfoundland and Labrador Route 419 =

Highway in Newfoundland and Labrador, Canada

Route 419
- Wild Cove Road

Route information
- Maintained by Newfoundland and Labrador Department of Transportation and Infrastructure
- Length: 12.0 km (7.5 mi)

Major junctions
- South end: Route 412 near Baie Verte
- North end: Wild Cove

Location
- Country: Canada
- Province: Newfoundland and Labrador

Highway system
- Highways in Newfoundland and Labrador
← Route 418	→ Route 420

Route 419, also known as Wild Cove Road, is a short 12.0-kilometre-long (7.5 mi) north–south highway on the Baie Verte Peninsula of Newfoundland in the Canadian province of Newfoundland and Labrador. It connects the community of Wild Cove with the town of Baie Verte via Route 412 (Seal Cove Road), serving as the only road access to Wild Cove. There are no other major intersections or communities of any kind along the entire length of Route 419, with the highway being winding and curvy as it traverses very hilly terrain. As with most highways in Newfoundland and Labrador, the entire length of Route 419 is a two-lane highway.

Route 419 is one of only two highways in the entire province of Newfoundland and Labrador ending with the number 9, the other being Route 239 on the Bonavista Peninsula.

== Major intersections ==
Location	km	mi	Destinations	Notes
	0.0	0.0	Route 412 (Seal Cove Road) – Baie Verte, Seal Cove	Southern terminus
Wild Cove	12.0	7.5	Dead End	Northern terminus
1.000 mi = 1.609 km; 1.000 km = 0.621 mi
