= Newfoundland and Labrador Route 412 =

Highway in Newfoundland and Labrador, Canada

Route 412
- Seal Cove Road

Route information
- Maintained by Newfoundland and Labrador Department of Transportation and Infrastructure
- Length: 13.5 km (8.4 mi)

Major junctions
- West end: Seal Cove
- Route 419 near Wild Cove
- East end: Route 410 in Baie Verte

Location
- Country: Canada
- Province: Newfoundland and Labrador

Highway system
- Highways in Newfoundland and Labrador
← Route 411	→ Route 413

Route 412, also known as Seal Cove Road, is a 13.5-kilometre-long (8.4 mi) east–west highway on the Baie Verte Peninsula of Newfoundland in the Canadian province of Newfoundland and Labrador. It connects the town of Seal Cove, along the community of Wild Cove (via Route 419), with Baie Verte and Route 410 (Dorset Trail).

== Route description ==
Route 412 begins along the coast of White Bay in downtown Seal Cove. It winds its way east to climb a hill to leave town and passing through rural wooded areas for several kilometres, where it has an intersection with Route 419 (Wild Cove Road). The highway passes through more wooded areas to enter Baie Verte and it comes to an end at an intersection with Route 410 at the southwestern edge of town.

== Major intersections ==
Location	km	mi	Destinations	Notes
Seal Cove	0.0	0.0	Main Road	Western terminus
	8.8	5.5	Route 419 north (Wild Cove Road) – Wild Cove	Southern terminus of Route 419
Baie Verte	13.5	8.4	Route 410 (Dorset Trail) to Route 1 (TCH) – Fleur de Lys, Downtown, La Scie	Eastern terminus
1.000 mi = 1.609 km; 1.000 km = 0.621 mi
