= Newfoundland and Labrador Route 415 =

Highway in Newfoundland and Labrador, Canada

Route 415
- Nipper's Harbour Road

Route information
- Maintained by Newfoundland and Labrador Department of Transportation and Infrastructure
- Length: 18.3 km (11.4 mi)

Major junctions
- South end: Nipper's Harbour
- North end: Route 414 near Harbour Round

Location
- Country: Canada
- Province: Newfoundland and Labrador

Highway system
- Highways in Newfoundland and Labrador
← Route 414	→ Route 416

Route 415, also known as Nipper's Harbour Road, is a 18.3-kilometre-long (11.4 mi) north–south highway on the Baie Verte Peninsula of Newfoundland in the Canadian Province of Newfoundland and Labrador. It serves as the only road access to the town of Nipper's Harbour, connecting it with Route 414 (La Scie Highway) at the other end. Route 415 is a winding, two-lane, gravel road for its entire length, with no other major intersections or highways of any kind, traveling almost exclusively through wooded and hilly terrain.

== Major intersections ==
Location	km	mi	Destinations	Notes
Nipper's Harbour	0.0	0.0	Dead End on Main Street	Southern terminus
	18.3	11.4	Route 414 (La Scie Highway) to Route 1 (TCH) – La Scie, Seal Cove, Baie Verte	Northern terminus
1.000 mi = 1.609 km; 1.000 km = 0.621 mi
