= Coachman's Cove =

- Town
- Location of Coachman's Cove in Newfoundland
- Coordinates: 50°03′33.07″N 56°07′09.25″W
- Country: Canada
- Province: Newfoundland and Labrador

Area
  - Land: 18.15 km^{2} (7.01 sq mi)

Population (2021)
  - Total: 111
  - Density: 5.8/km^{2} (15/sq mi)
- Time zone: UTC-3:30 (Newfoundland Time)
  - Summer (DST): UTC-2:30 (Newfoundland Daylight)
- Area code: 709
- Highways: Route 410

Coachman's Cove is a town in the Canadian province of Newfoundland and Labrador. The town had a population of 111 in the Canada 2021 Census.

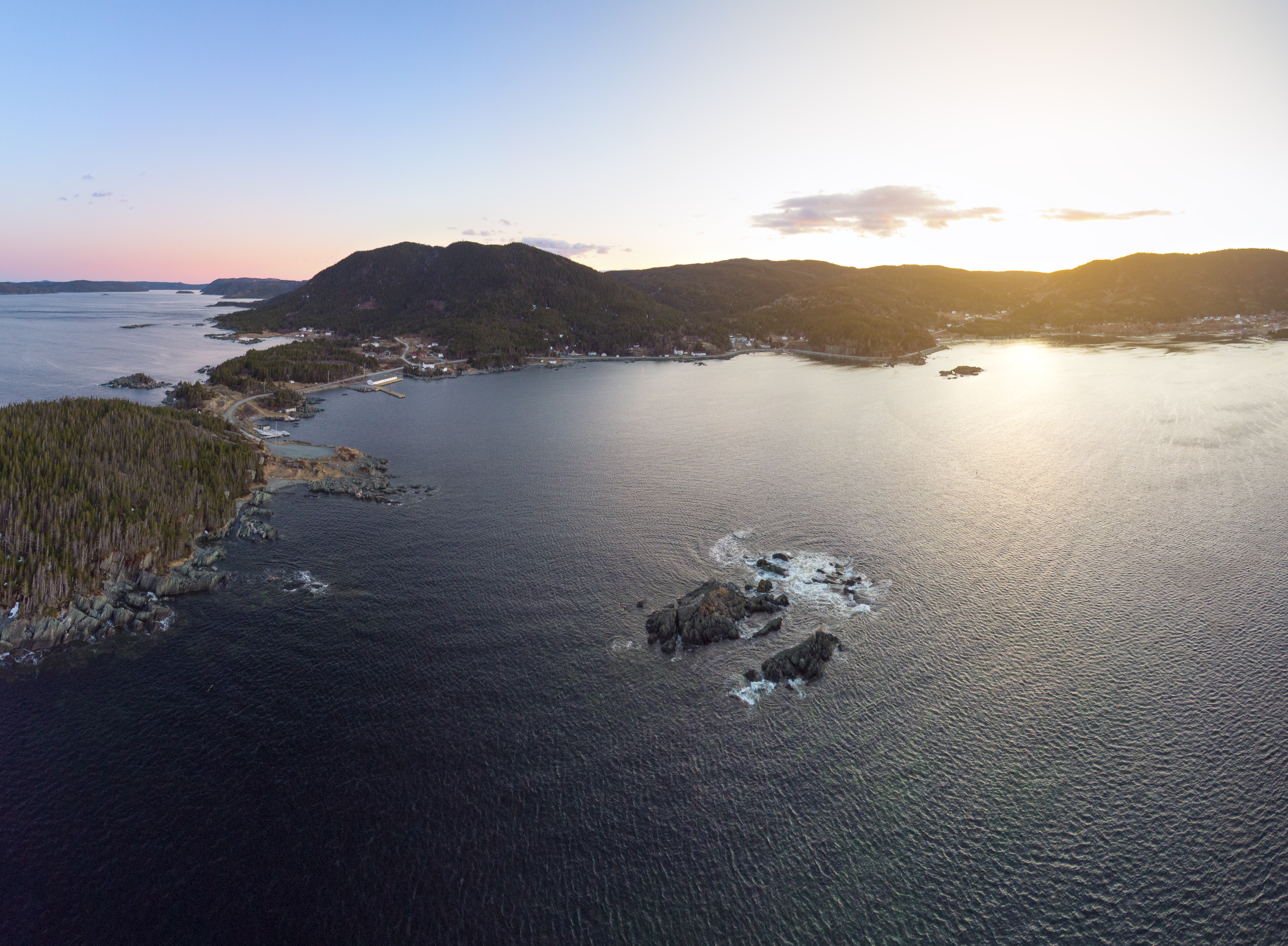
Coachman's Cove with Gentille Island in the foreground

== History ==
Coachman's Cove was originally named Pot d'Etain, which means Tin Pot Islands. It was incorporated in 1970 and is located north of Baie Verte on the east side of a promontory near a tip of the Baie Verte Peninsula. Its name was derived from Irish settlers who were living there year-round in the 1860s. The first permanent settlers to arrive in Coachman's Cove possibly came at the invitation of the French in the early 19th century to act as guardians of French stages and fishing equipment during the winter months. These settlers decided to stay and establish a permanent fishing settlement.

Like other communities on the Baie Verte Peninsula, Coachman's Cove had a double identity and double population. During the summer the community had mostly French, Roman Catholic residents, who came from France to fish for cod from June to September. During the winter months the population of Coachman's Cove was made up of Anglo-Irish Newfoundlanders. The first names associated with the settlement were Downey, Bailey, Norman, Dobbin, Dow, Demfy, and Drover.

It is likely that the large number of inhabitants recorded in the 1869 census included the French summer fishermen because the population of Coachman's Cove did not go above 200 again until 1921. Coachman's Cove was first recorded in the census of 1869, with 237 inhabitants. In 1872 there were fifty-one people living in the community. The building of the church there in 1872 showed the importance of the community to the French as a fishing station.

By 1935, the population of Coachman's Cove was 295. The early settlers of Coachman's Cove depended mainly on the cod and herring fisheries for their livelihood, but by 1935 the lumbering and sawmilling industries became increasingly the main source of employment for the community. Five years later, in 1940, there were three sawmills and by 1950 lumbering had become the main employer in Coachman's Cove. In the winter months, the fishermen worked in the woods and in the local sawmills. It was reported that the sawmills in the area supplied the timber for all the piers on the northeast coast.

By 1952, Coachman's Cove had a public wharf, a Credit Union and a two-room Roman Catholic school. During the 1960s Coachman's Cove was linked by road to other settlements on the Baie Verte Peninsula. The high rate of unemployment and the community's isolation made livelihood difficult in the 1960s and 1970s. Approximately 35 men went to work at the Asbestos mines in Baie Verte when it opened in 1963-64. The remainder of the people were employed as fishermen and seasonal labourers.

Coachman's Cove today is a quaint quiet community and still shows signs of its French history. The uncovering of a new Paleo-Eskimo site in 1999-2000 shows that the area surrounding Coachman's Cove was inhabited approximately 3,000 years ago.

== Demographics ==
In the 2021 Census of Population conducted by Statistics Canada, Coachman's Cove had a population of 111 living in 50 of its 74 total private dwellings, a change of 5.7% from its 2016 population of 105. With a land area of 18.99 km^{2} (7.33 sq mi), it had a population density of 5.8/km^{2} (15.1/sq mi) in 2021.
