= List of highways numbered 410 =

The following highways are numbered 410:

== Canada ==
- Manitoba Provincial Road 410
- Newfoundland and Labrador Route 410
- Ontario Highway 410
- Quebec Autoroute 410

== Japan ==
- Japan National Route 410

== Philippines ==
- N410_highway_(Philippines)

== Thailand ==
- Thailand Route 410 (Pattani-Betong Highway)

== United States ==
- Interstate 410
- U.S. Route 410 (former)
- Georgia State Route 410 (unsigned designation for the western half of the Stone Mountain Freeway)
- Louisiana Highway 410
- Maryland Route 410
- New York:
  - New York State Route 410
  - County Route 410 (Erie County, New York)
- North Carolina Highway 410
- Oregon Route 410
- Pennsylvania Route 410
- Puerto Rico Highway 410
- South Carolina Highway 410
- Texas State Highway Loop 410, two former roads
- Virginia State Route 410 (former)
- Washington State Route 410
- Wyoming Highway 410

Preceded by 409	Lists of highways 410	Succeeded by 411
