= Balsam Bud Cove =

Cove of island of Newfoundland, Canada

Balsam Bud Cove is a cove of the island of Newfoundland in the Canadian province of Newfoundland and Labrador. It is located on Green Bay and is a part of the now resettled community of Round Harbour.
