= List of highways numbered 415 =

The following highways are numbered 415:

== Canada ==
- Manitoba Provincial Road 415
- New Brunswick Route 415
- Newfoundland and Labrador Route 415

== Costa Rica ==
- National Route 415

== India ==
- National Highway 415 (India)

== Japan ==
- Japan National Route 415

== United States ==
- Interstate 415 (former)
- Florida:
  - Florida State Road 415
    - County Road 415 (Volusia County, Florida)
  - Florida State Road 415A (former)
  - County Road 415 (Seminole County, Florida)
- Georgia State Route 415 (unsigned designation for Interstate 520)
- Iowa Highway 415
- Louisiana Highway 415
  - Louisiana Highway 415 Spur
- Maryland Route 415
- New York:
  - New York State Route 415
    - County Route 415 (Steuben County, New York) (former)
  - New York State 415 (former)
- Pennsylvania Route 415
- Puerto Rico Highway 415
- Virginia State Route 415

Preceded by 414	Lists of highways 415	Succeeded by 416
