= Ivanhoe, Newfoundland and Labrador =

Human settlement in Newfoundland and Labrador

Coordinates: 48°12′N 53°31′W

Ivanhoe, originally Old Tilt, was a small settlement on the island of Ireland's Eye in the Trinity area of Newfoundland and Labrador.

Ivanhoe was established as Old Tilt no later than 1891, although Ireland's Eye had been in use since the 1600s. It had a population of 21 in 1891 and a peak population of 101 in 1945. The post office in Ivanhoe was built on September 4, 1952, and opened to the public for business on September 11 of that year. The first postmistress was Mrs. Lillian Ivany, in honour of whom the post office itself was named. Ivanhoe was resettled on September 13, 1966.

Ivanhoe shared Ireland's Eye with several other resettled communities, including Ireland's Eye and Black Duck Cove.

== See also ==
- Ireland's Eye, Newfoundland and Labrador
- Black Duck Cove, Trinity Bay, Newfoundland and Labrador
- Resettlement (Newfoundland)
- List of ghost towns in Newfoundland and Labrador
