= Ireland's Eye, Newfoundland and Labrador =

Former settlement in Canada

Coordinates: 48°13′N 53°30′W

Location of Ireland's Eye in Newfoundland

Ireland's Eye was a small settlement on an island of the same name off the northeast corner of Random Island in Newfoundland and Labrador, Canada. It is accessible only by boat.

Ireland's Eye was occupied as early as 1675. A way office was established in 1886. The first waymaster was Thomas Cooper. The schooner Annie E. Conrad ran aground here on 16 July 1929. There was a post office between 1941 and 1965. The population was 157 in 1911, 92 in 1956, and 16 by 1966. The community was resettled on October 12, 1965.

Ireland's Eye shared the island with several other resettled communities, including Ivanhoe and Black Duck Cove.

== See also ==
- Ivanhoe, Newfoundland and Labrador
- Black Duck Cove, Trinity Bay, Newfoundland and Labrador
- Resettlement (Newfoundland)
- List of communities in Newfoundland and Labrador
