= List of highways numbered 412 =

The following highways are numbered 412:

== Canada ==
- Newfoundland and Labrador Route 412
- Ontario Highway 412

== Israel ==
- Route 412 (Israel)

== Japan ==
- Japan National Route 412

== United Kingdom ==
- A412 road

== United States ==
- U.S. Route 412
- Georgia State Route 412 (unsigned designation for former proposed Interstate 175)
- New York:
  - New York State Route 412
  - County Route 412 (Albany County, New York)
  - County Route 412 (Erie County, New York)
- Ohio State Route 412
- Oklahoma:
  - Oklahoma State Highway 412A
  - Oklahoma State Highway 412B
  - Oklahoma State Highway 412P
- Pennsylvania Route 412
- Puerto Rico Highway 412
- South Carolina Highway 412
- Virginia State Route 412
- Wyoming Highway 412

Preceded by 411	Lists of highways 412	Succeeded by 413
