= List of highways numbered 416 =

The following highways are numbered 416:

== Canada ==
- Manitoba Provincial Road 416
- Newfoundland and Labrador Route 416
- Highway 416 (Ontario)

== Costa Rica ==
- National Route 416

== Japan ==
- Japan National Route 416

== United States ==
- Florida:
  - Florida State Road 416
  - County Road 416 (Pinellas County, Florida)
- Louisiana Highway 416
- Maryland Route 416 (former)
- New York State Route 416
- Ohio State Route 416
- Pennsylvania Route 416
- Puerto Rico Highway 416
- Tennessee State Route 416
- Texas State Highway Loop 416 (former)

Preceded by 415	Lists of highways 416	Succeeded by 417
