= List of highways numbered 411 =

Route 411 or Highway 411 may refer to:

== Canada ==
- Manitoba Provincial Road 411
- Newfoundland and Labrador Route 411

== Costa Rica ==
- National Route 411

== Cuba ==
- San Jose–Tapaste Road (2–411)

== Israel ==
- Route 411 (Israel)

== Japan ==
- Japan National Route 411

== United States ==
- U.S. Route 411
- Georgia State Route 411 (unsigned designation for Interstate 185)
- Louisiana Highway 411
- Mississippi Highway 411
- New Mexico State Road 411
- New York:
  - New York State Route 411
  - County Route 411 (Albany County, New York)
- North Carolina Highway 411
- Puerto Rico Highway 411
- Washington State Route 411
  - Washington State Route 411 Spur
- Wyoming Highway 411

Preceded by 410	Lists of highways 411	Succeeded by 412
