= Garia (disambiguation) =

Garia may refer to:

== Places ==
- Garia, a neighbourhood of south Kolkata, India
- Garia, Newfoundland and Labrador

== People ==
- Garia, a clan of the Bharwad people found mostly in India

== Events ==
- Garia puja, a festival in Tripura, India
