= Nipper's Harbour =

- Town
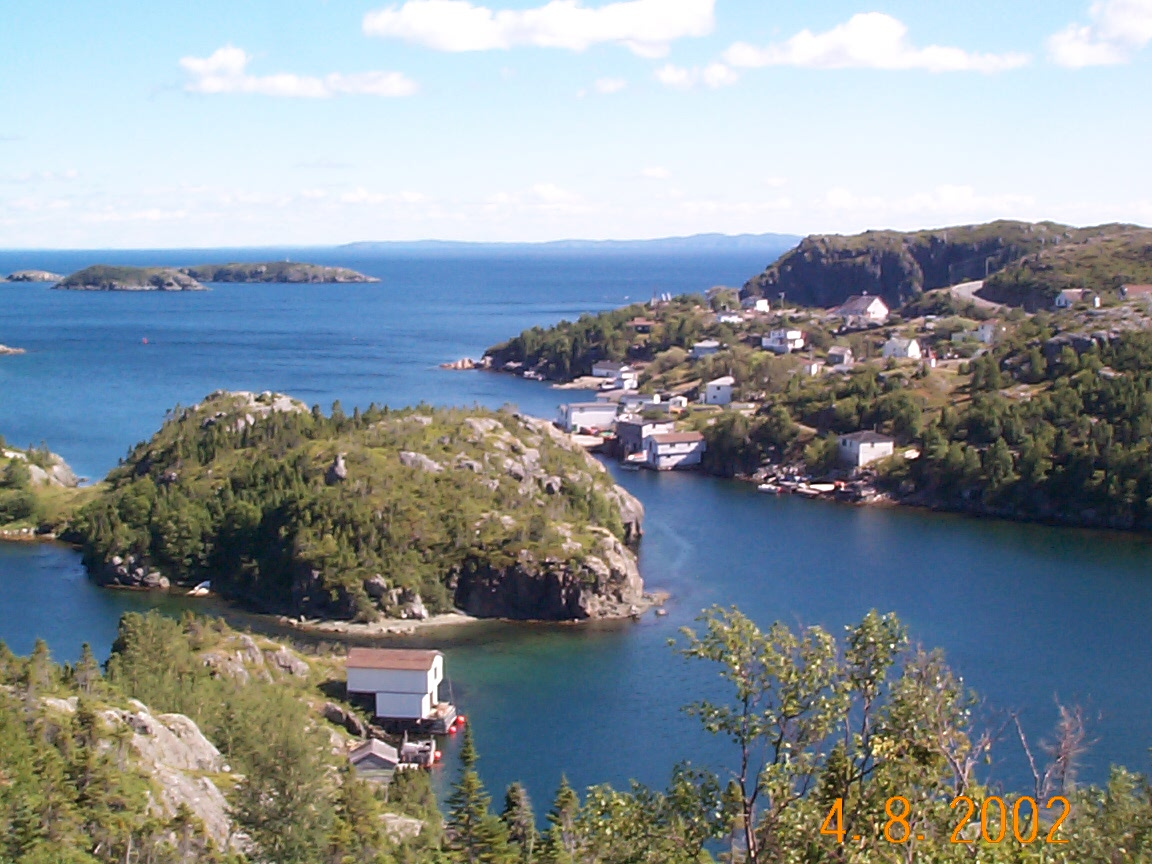

- Location of Nipper's Harbour in Newfoundland
- Coordinates: 49°47′11.03″N 55°51′41.74″W
- Country: Canada
- Province: Newfoundland and Labrador
- Settled: 1804

Population (2021)
  - Total: 74
- Time zone: UTC-3:30 (Newfoundland Time)
  - Summer (DST): UTC-2:30 (Newfoundland Daylight)
- Area code: 709
- Highways: Route 415

Nipper's Harbour is a town located on the east coast of the Baie Verte Peninsula of Newfoundland in the Canadian province of Newfoundland and Labrador. This incorporated community of 85 people is located on a rocky inlet that combines Nipper's Harbour and Noble's Cove, and where the primary industry is the inshore fishery. The town is approximately 58 km from Baie Verte.

In 2013, the town voted 98% in favour of resettlement; however, the provincial government refused to offer financial compensation to the residents, arguing that it would be more cost efficient for them to not resettle.

In 2021, the local school, Bayview Primary, closed due to no enrolment.

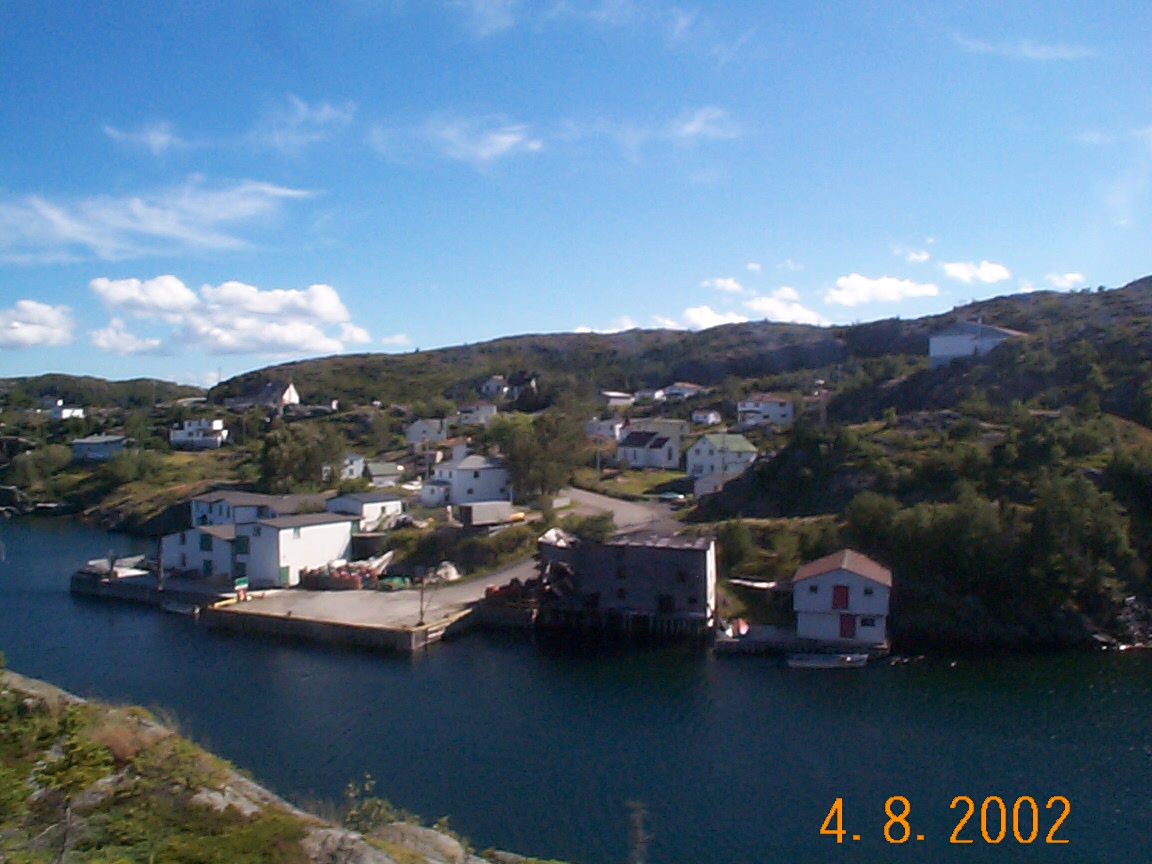
The Bait Depot

== Etymology ==
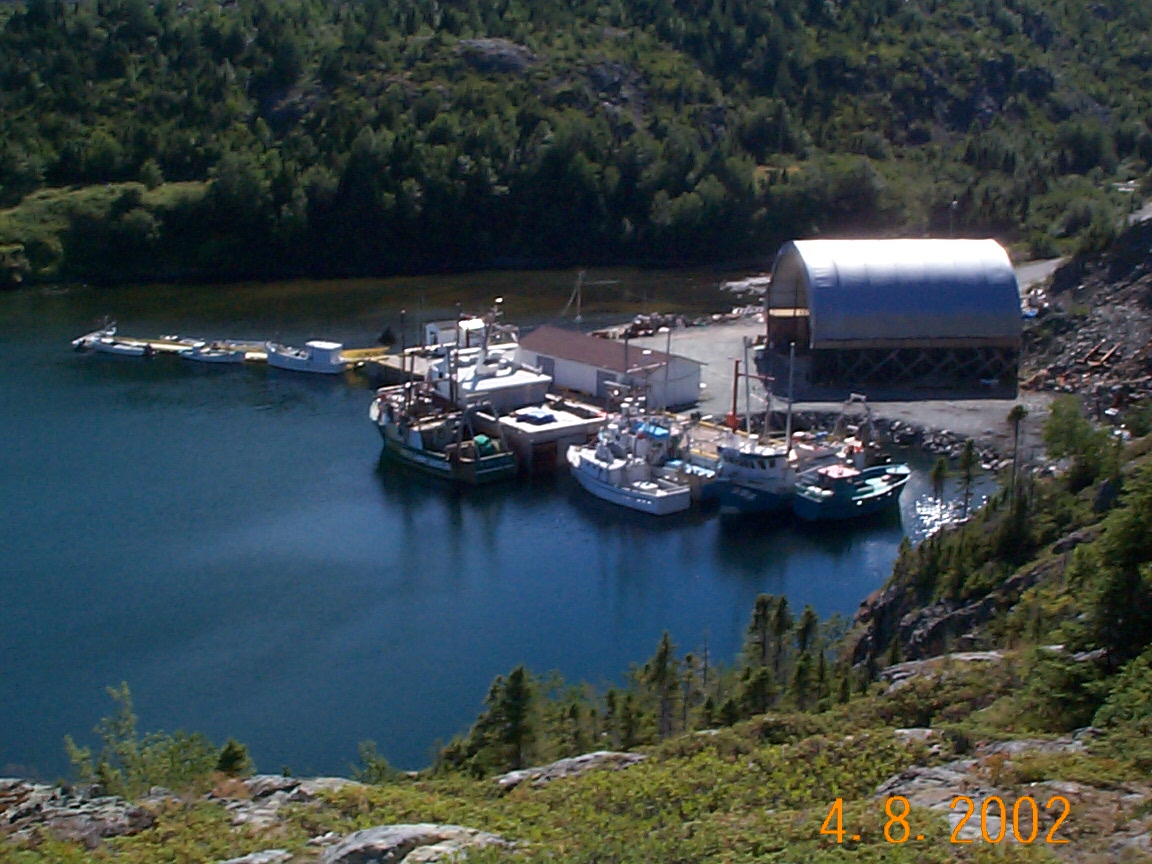
"The Bottom"

The derivation of the name is believed to be from the local name for the mosquito, the "jarnipper."

== Geography ==
Nipper's Harbour is on the east coast of the Baie Verte Peninsula and part of the Notre Dame Bay waterway. By road, it is approximately 200 km north of Deer Lake International Airport, and roughly 650 km northwest via the Trans Canada Highway from the provincial capital, St. John's.

A group of seven small islands (Nipper's Islands) are located approximately one mile offshore from the harbour entrance. The largest island, Seal Island, was the site of a large lighthouse until 40 years ago; the smallest, Gull Island, is a nesting sight for local seagulls.

== Demographics ==
In the 2021 Census of Population conducted by Statistics Canada, Nippers Harbour had a population of 74 living in 34 of its 66 total private dwellings, a change of −12.9% from its 2016 population of 85. With a land area of 1.93 km^{2} (0.75 sq mi), it had a population density of 38.3/km^{2} (99.3/sq mi) in 2021.

== See also ==
- Baie Verte Peninsula
- List of cities and towns in Newfoundland and Labrador
