= List of highways numbered 414 =

The following highways are numbered 414:

== Canada ==
- Newfoundland and Labrador Route 414

== Costa Rica ==
- National Route 414

== Japan ==
- Japan National Route 414

== United States ==
- Florida State Road 414
- Georgia State Route 414 (unsigned designation for former proposed Interstate 420
- Louisiana Highway 414
- Maryland Route 414
- New York State Route 414
- Oregon Route 414
- Pennsylvania Route 414
- Puerto Rico Highway 414
- South Carolina Highway 414
- Wyoming Highway 414

Preceded by 413	Lists of highways 414	Succeeded by 415
