= List of highways numbered 413 =

Route 413 or Highway 413 may refer to:

== Canada ==
- Newfoundland and Labrador Route 413
- Ontario Highway 413

== Costa Rica ==
- National Route 413

== Japan ==
- Japan National Route 413

== United Kingdom ==
- A413 road Gerrards Cross - Towcester

== United States ==
- Georgia State Route 413 (unsigned designation for Interstate 675)
- Louisiana Highway 413
- Maryland Route 413
- Missouri Route 413
- New Jersey Route 413
- New York:
  - New York State Route 413 (former)
  - County Route 413 (Erie County, New York)
- Oregon Route 413
- Pennsylvania Route 413
- South Carolina Highway 413
- Virginia State Route 413
- Wyoming Highway 413

Territories

- Puerto Rico Highway 413

Preceded by 412	Lists of highways 413	Succeeded by 414
