= Black Duck Cove =

Black Duck Cove may refer to:

- Black Duck Cove, Great Northern Peninsula, Newfoundland and Labrador
- Black Duck Cove, Notre Dame Bay, Newfoundland and Labrador
- Black Duck Cove, Trinity Bay, Newfoundland and Labrador
