= Grand Bruit, Newfoundland and Labrador =

Human settlement in Canada

Coordinates: 47°40′24″N 58°13′33″W

Grand Bruit (/ˈɡrændbrɪt/; means "great noise" in French) is a designated place and former settlement in the Canadian province of Newfoundland and Labrador. It is on the southwestern coast of the island of Newfoundland. Grand Bruit was resettled in 2010. The community was divided down the middle by a waterfall, hence the name "Grand Bruit" which is French for "great noise".

== History ==
Grand Bruit was founded in the early 19th century. It experienced depopulation related to changing economic and demographic conditions in rural Newfoundland, in particular the collapse of the Newfoundland cod fisheries in the early 1990s.

The last school in the community closed on June 22, 2007, as the last students from the town graduated from elementary school.

By 2009, Grand Bruit had an aging population of 31. By September 2009, 26 out of 31 residents had voted their intent to move the community and take payouts from the Government of Newfoundland and Labrador of $100,000. A provincial law on resettling outports requires 90 percent of a community to consent to relocation before a community can be moved. Residents have the option to apply for government permits to return to their homes seasonally for use as summer cottages.

As of July 2010, the last remaining residents of Grand Bruit accepted the provincial government's offer of $80,000 per household ($90,000 offered to households of two or more residents). By 2010, the last permanent residents had relocated and ferry service ceased.

== Geography ==
Grand Bruit is in Newfoundland within Subdivision I of Division No. 3. It is east of Channel-Port aux Basques.

== Demographics ==
As a designated place in the 2021 Census of Population conducted by Statistics Canada, Grand Bruit recorded a population of 0 living in 0 of its 0 total private dwellings, a change of nan% from its 2016 population of 0. With a land area of 1.74 km^{2} (0.67 sq mi), it had a population density of 0.0/km^{2} (0.0/sq mi) in 2016.

== See also ==
- List of designated places in Newfoundland and Labrador
- Newfoundland outport
- Resettlement (Newfoundland)
