= Pacquet =

Coordinates: 49°59′25″N 55°53′20″W

- Town
- Interactive map of Pacquet
- Country: Canada
- Province: Newfoundland and Labrador

Population (2021)
  - Total: 145
- Time zone: UTC-3:30 (Newfoundland Time)
  - Summer (DST): UTC-2:30 (Newfoundland Daylight)
- Area code: 709
- Highways: Route 417

Pacquet ("hideaway" in French) is a town in the Canadian province of Newfoundland and Labrador. The town had a population of 145 in 2021, down from 184 in the Canada 2011 Census.

Located in White Bay, on the Baie Verte Peninsula in northeastern Newfoundland, it was surveyed in 1801 by Capt. Edgell, Edgell Island being his namesake.

It is not known for certain when Pacquet was first settled. A fishing and logging community, it is on what was once part of the French Shore. Pacquet (then spelled "Paquet") was a base for French seasonal fishermen from about the time of the Treaty of Utrecht in 1713, and Frenchmen continued to visit its sheltered harbour until late in the nineteenth century. The first recorded residents were an elderly man and a young girl, who were there by 1857. Twelve years later, two Roman Catholic families were in residence, but the population did not grow substantially until the 1880s, when the French officially left the area. In 2019, Pacquet's First United Church was destroyed by fire.

== Demographics ==
In the 2021 Census of Population conducted by Statistics Canada, Pacquet had a population of 145 living in 76 of its 97 total private dwellings, a change of −11.6% from its 2016 population of 164. With a land area of 14.44 km^{2} (5.58 sq mi), it had a population density of 10.0/km^{2} (26.0/sq mi) in 2021.

== See also ==
- List of cities and towns in Newfoundland and Labrador
- CNLR 332/96 - Town of Pacquet Order under the Municipalities Act
