= Brad Brown =

Canadian ice hockey player (born 1975)

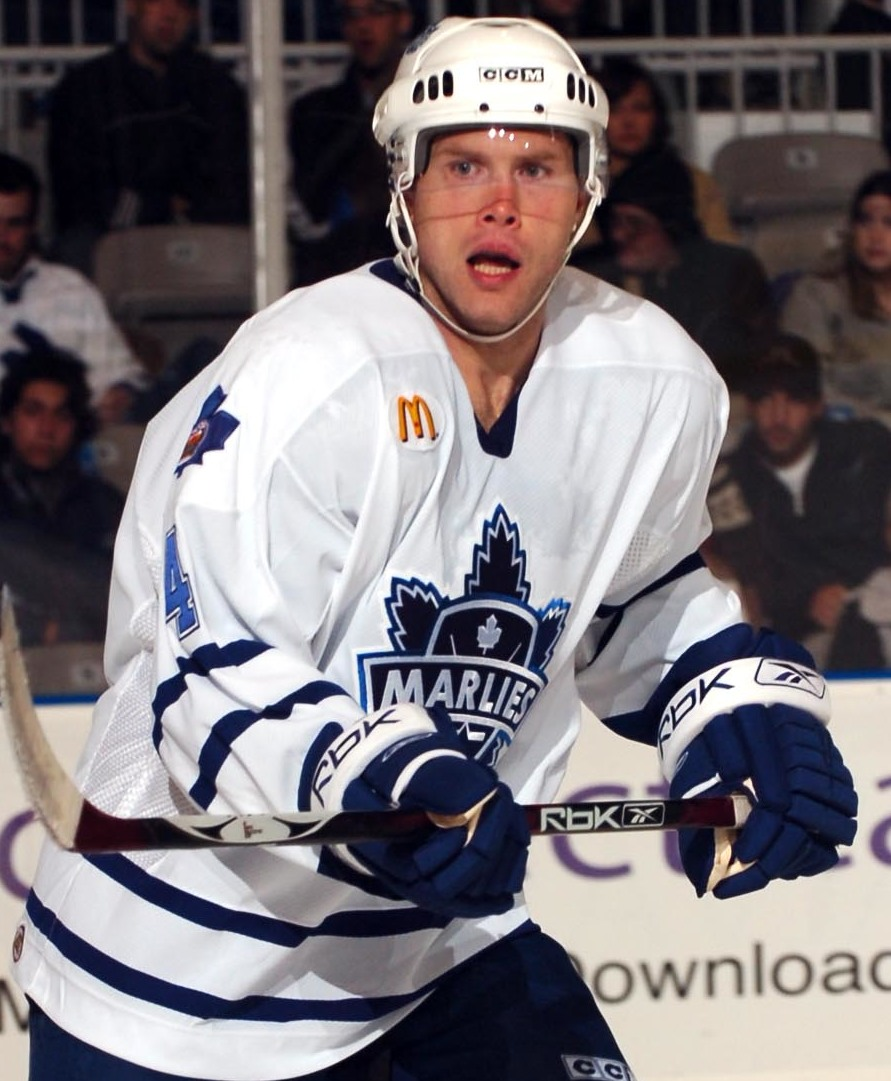
- Brown with the Toronto Marlies in 2006
- Born: December 27, 1975 (age 50) Baie Verte, Newfoundland, Canada
- Height: 6 ft 3 in (191 cm)
- Weight: 218 lb (99 kg; 15 st 8 lb)
- Position: Defence
- Shot: Right
- Played for: Montreal Canadiens; Chicago Blackhawks; New York Rangers; Minnesota Wild; Buffalo Sabres
- NHL draft: 18th overall, 1994; Montreal Canadiens
- Playing career: 1995–2009

Bradley Lorne Brown (born December 27, 1975) is a Canadian former professional ice hockey defenceman.

== Playing career ==
As a youth, Brown played in the 1989 Quebec International Pee-Wee Hockey Tournament with a minor ice hockey team from Mississauga.

Brown played junior hockey with the North Bay Centennials and Barrie Colts in the Ontario Hockey League. As captain of the Centennials in the 1994–95 season, he received the OHL Humanitarian of the Year for working with special needs children and the community. Brown was drafted in the first round, 18th overall, by the Montreal Canadiens in the 1994 NHL entry draft. he made his professional debut in the 1995–96 season, finishing out the year with the Fredericton Canadiens of the AHL.

A defensive defenseman, Brown made his NHL debut the following year in the 1996–97 season with the Montreal Canadiens on November 1, 1996, against the Boston Bruins. Playing mostly for the Fredericton in the next two years Brown's career was established after he was traded by the Canadiens, along with Jocelyn Thibault and Dave Manson, to the Chicago Blackhawks for Jeff Hackett, Eric Weinrich, and Alain Nasreddine on November 16, 1998.

Brown played the next two seasons as a fixture on the Blackhawks defense. Prior to the 2000–01 season, Brown was traded by the Blackhawks along with Michal Grosek to the New York Rangers on October 5, 2000.

On July 31, 2001, Brown was signed as a free agent by the Minnesota Wild. Brown was an integral part of the Wild's defense until the end of the 2003–04 season when he was traded to the Buffalo Sabres of a fourth-round pick on March 8, 2004.

After the 2004 NHL Lockout, Brown was signed by the Toronto Maple Leafs on September 10, 2005. Brown however struggled with form and never played for the Leafs, except for preseason games. Rather playing through his contract with Leafs affiliate, the Toronto Marlies.

On September 18, 2008, Brown was invited to the Philadelphia Flyers training camp but was later released on September 30, 2008. Brown instead started the 2008–09 season in the ECHL with the Fresno Falcons. He was given a tryout with the Quad City Flames of the AHL before he was signed by the Flames for the rest of the year on December 26, 2008.

== Personal life ==
After hockey, Brown became an account executive in the consulting services department of Ottawa-based IT company Maplesoft. He is also president of the Maplesoft Hawks Hockey Organization. The program consists of boys and girls' spring AAA hockey teams as well as unique skill development camps and clinics that operate year-round.

== Career statistics ==
			Regular season					Playoffs
Season	Team	League	GP	G	A	Pts	PIM	GP	G	A	Pts	PIM
1990–91	Toronto Red Wings AAA	Midget	80	15	45	60	105	—	—	—	—	—
1990–91	St. Michael's Buzzers	MetJHL	2	0	0	0	0	—	—	—	—	—
1991–92	North Bay Centennials	OHL	49	2	9	11	170	18	0	6	6	43
1992–93	North Bay Centennials	OHL	61	4	9	13	228	2	0	2	2	13
1993–94	North Bay Centennials	OHL	66	8	24	32	196	18	3	12	15	33
1994–95	North Bay Centennials	OHL	64	8	38	46	172	6	1	4	5	8
1995–96	Barrie Colts	OHL	27	3	13	16	82	—	—	—	—	—
1995–96	Fredericton Canadiens	AHL	38	0	3	3	148	10	2	1	3	6
1996–97	Fredericton Canadiens	AHL	64	3	7	10	368	—	—	—	—	—
1996–97	Montreal Canadiens	NHL	8	0	0	0	22	—	—	—	—	—
1997–98	Fredericton Canadiens	AHL	64	1	8	9	297	4	0	0	0	29
1998–99	Montreal Canadiens	NHL	5	0	0	0	21	—	—	—	—	—
1998–99	Chicago Blackhawks	NHL	61	1	7	8	184	—	—	—	—	—
1999–2000	Chicago Blackhawks	NHL	57	0	9	9	134	—	—	—	—	—
2000–01	New York Rangers	NHL	48	1	3	4	107	—	—	—	—	—
2001–02	Minnesota Wild	NHL	51	0	4	4	123	—	—	—	—	—
2002–03	Minnesota Wild	NHL	57	0	1	1	90	11	0	0	0	16
2003–04	Minnesota Wild	NHL	30	0	1	1	54	—	—	—	—	—
2003–04	Buffalo Sabres	NHL	13	0	2	2	12	—	—	—	—	—
2005–06	Toronto Marlies	AHL	38	2	2	4	93	2	0	0	0	0
2006–07	Toronto Marlies	AHL	36	0	3	3	62	—	—	—	—	—
2007–08	Florida Everblades	ECHL	26	2	1	3	68	2	0	0	0	0
2007–08	Hartford Wolf Pack	AHL	10	0	1	1	5	—	—	—	—	—
2008–09	Fresno Falcons	ECHL	16	0	2	2	32	—	—	—	—	—
2008–09	Quad City Flames	AHL	46	1	1	2	96	—	—	—	—	—
AHL totals			296	7	25	32	1069	16	2	1	3	35
NHL totals			330	2	27	29	747	11	0	0	0	16

== See also ==
- Captain (ice hockey)

Preceded by Saku Koivu	Montreal Canadiens first-round draft pick 1994	Succeeded by Terry Ryan
Preceded by Filip Kuba	Minnesota Wild captain December–January 2001–2002	Succeeded by Andrew Brunette
Preceded by Brad Bombardir	Minnesota Wild captain October 2003	Succeeded by Andrew Brunette
