= Black Duck Cove, Trinity Bay, Newfoundland and Labrador =

Coordinates: 48.219°N 53.501°W

Location of Black Duck Cove in Newfoundland and Labrador

Black Duck Cove was a small settlement on the island of Ireland's Eye off the northeast corner of Random Island in Newfoundland and Labrador. It was resettled along with other communities on the island in the 1900s.

It shared the island with several other resettled communities, including Ireland's Eye and Ivanhoe.

== See also ==
- Ivanhoe, Newfoundland and Labrador
- Ireland's Eye, Newfoundland and Labrador
- Resettlement (Newfoundland)
- List of communities in Newfoundland and Labrador
