= Resettlement (Newfoundland) =

Canadian provincial centralization efforts since 1954

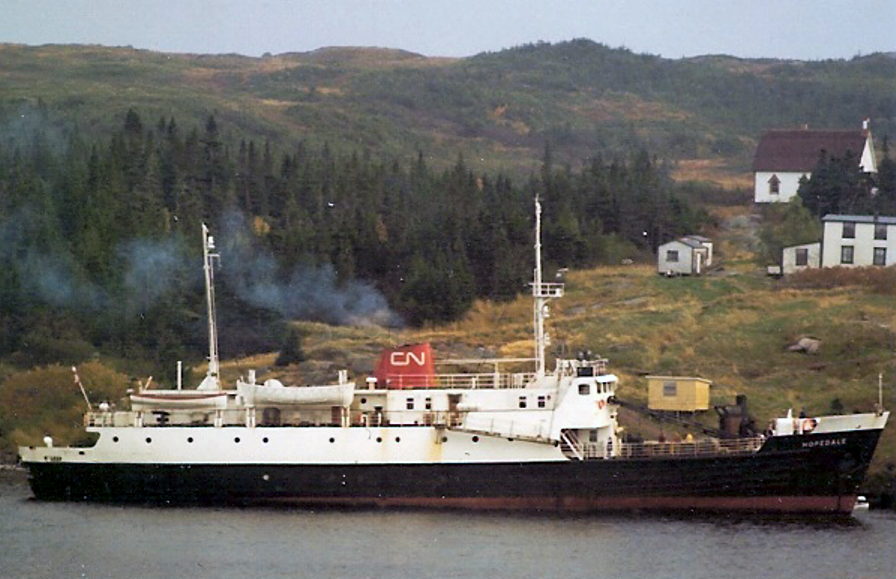
The ferry Hopedale calls at a remote outport on La Poile Bay in southwestern Newfoundland in 1971. Such communities as this were depopulated through resettlement programs of the provincial government between 1954 and 1975.

Resettlement in Newfoundland and Labrador terms refers to an organized approach to centralize the population into growth areas. It is used in the current context when referring to a voluntary relocation initiated from isolated communities themselves.

Three attempts of resettlement were initiated by the Government between 1954 and 1975 which resulted in the abandonment of 300 communities and nearly 30,000 people moved. Government's attempt of resettlement has been viewed as one of the most controversial government programs of the post-Confederation Newfoundland and Labrador.

In the 21st century, the Community Relocation Policy allows for voluntary relocation of isolated settlements. From 2002 to 2020, nine communities relocated.

== Background ==
The history and commerce of Newfoundland and Labrador was built on the fishery and thus many small communities were established throughout the entire coastal region. Some of these communities were seasonal fishing stations and some eventually grew into communities which were very much isolated from much of the country except for water transportation or overland hiking trails. In many communities the seasonal inshore cod fishery provided both sustenance and the vast majority of employment opportunities.

In the early 20th century, settlement patterns and population distribution were changing due to a number of factors. Newfoundlanders began moving to larger centres such as St. John's. For example, in 1874, the population of St. John's was 30,574 and the major Conception Bay districts had a combined population of 41,368. By 1935, the population of the Conception Bay districts had increased by over 4,500 people, while the population of St. John's had more than doubled to 65,256 people.

Other parts of the island and Labrador went through major changes in resource development that affected areas outside the Avalon Peninsula. The construction of paper mills in both Grand Falls and Corner Brook drew many people from coastal towns and villages. These areas contributed to growth in other areas such as Botwood and Deer Lake. Mineral discoveries at places such as Wabush and Labrador City, St. Lawrence, Baie Verte and Buchans also contributed to the movement of people away from the outports. World War II also had a part to play when air force bases were built at Stephenville, Argentia and Goose Bay, and the booming international airport in Gander.

The 1992 cod moratorium especially affected Newfoundland's rural outports, where the loss of an important source of income caused widespread out-migration. Some communities have tried to compensate by fishing shellfish, crab and shrimp, but their stocks are faltering in recent years. The moratorium is still in effect, but it has been slightly loosened to allow for some fishing. However, the stocks remain critical according to industry experts.

The ever-shrinking communities are struggling with an aging population that needs access to essential services. As of October 2017, the province's marine transportation system costs $76 million annually. It is often cited as a burden to the economy, requiring spending millions of dollars to guarantee frequent transport from communities with no more than a hundred residents.

== Prior to 1954 ==
Prior to the start of the government sponsored resettlement program, many communities were abandoned for various reasons including disease, lack of work and natural disaster. One of the earliest examples of this is the community of Garia. The community lost 3/4 of its inhabitants after they decided to move to Anticosti Island for work in 1873. The remaining residents slowly moved away and the community was abandoned in the 1910s.

Between 1946 and 1954, it is estimated that 49 communities were abandoned without government intervention. Government officials had long petitioned for a greater concentration of the population, citing many benefits. In 1953 the Newfoundland Department of Welfare offered small amounts of financial assistance to residents of 110 communities to accelerate the process which had come naturally. This became the beginning of the government assisted resettlement program for the province.

Labrador on a much smaller scale was experiencing a resettlement when the Moravian Church in the northern part of Labrador was relocating the Inuit to centres such as Hebron and Nain. Dr. Wilfred Grenfell, in his efforts to provide health and educational benefits to the people of southern Labrador and the northern coast of the Great Northern Peninsula, also helped to the centralization of populations in areas such as St. Anthony and Charlottetown.

== First Resettlement Program (1954-1965) ==
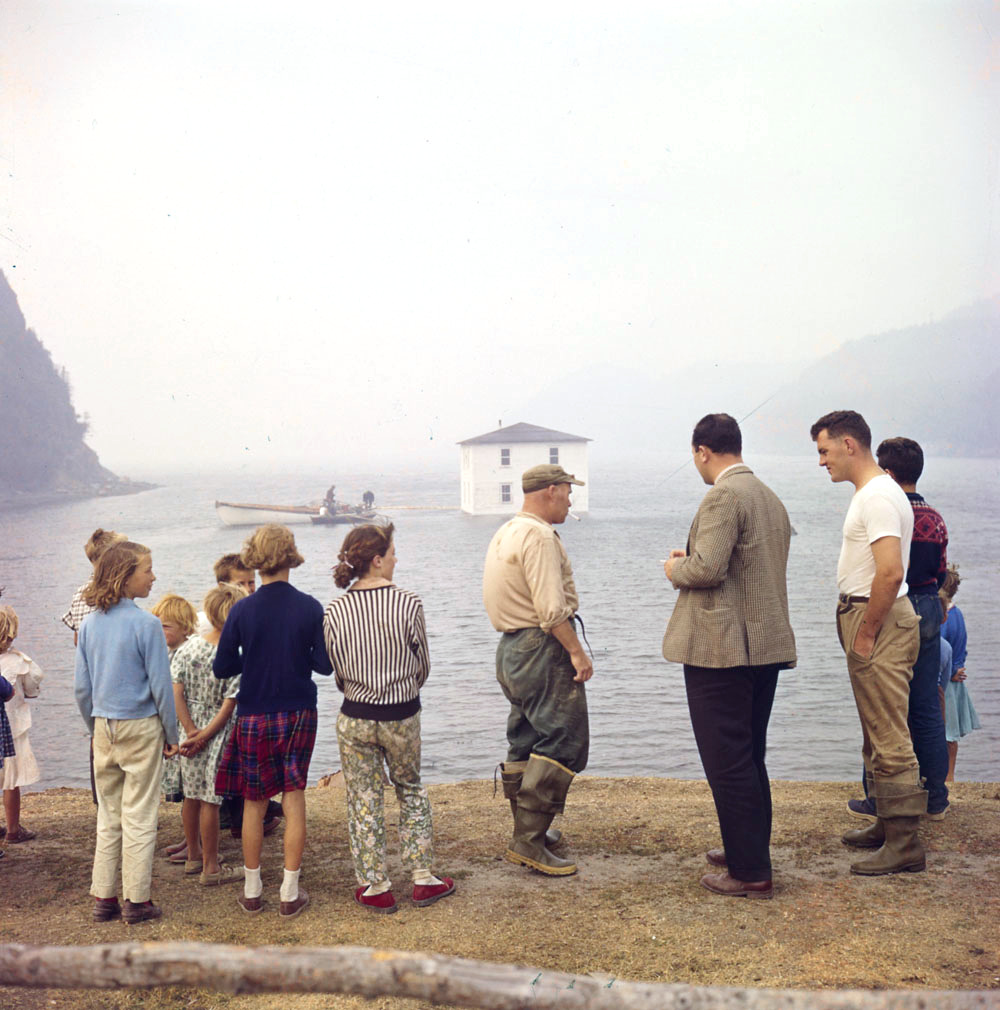
1961 Resettlement of Silver Fox Island: a house being relocated to Dover.

In 1954, the provincial Department of Welfare introduced a program to encourage residents of small coastal communities to move to larger "growth centres". The government would pay for the relocation of all of a family's belongings as well as their house to the new community. This was changed to a cash payment of $150 per family at the start of the program and gradually increased to $600 per family by the end of the program. This was a significant amount of money as a fisherman working in the inshore fishery was generally earning under $500 per year. In order for a community to be eligible for assistance every member would have to agree to relocate. By 1965, the program had helped resettle 115 communities with a combined population of 7500.

== Second and Third Resettlement Programs (1965-1975) ==
In 1965, the provincial and federal governments partnered in a new resettlement program. The new program was administered by the Department of Fisheries. Under the new program the assistance was increased to $1,000 per family plus $200 for each dependant in addition to moving costs. The proportion of residents who needed to agree to the move decreased to 90% and later to 80%. A second federal-provincial agreement was started in 1970, with responsibility being shared by the federal Department of Regional Economic Expansion (DREE) and the provincial Department of Community and Social Development. Between 1965 and 1975 some 148 communities were abandoned, involving the relocation of an additional 20,000 people.

== Community Relocation Policy (2010s) ==
State-assisted relocation is still practiced in Newfoundland and Labrador, but the requests must come from the communities themselves. The modern Community Relocation Policy clearly states that the government cannot encourage or "initiate any actions" to promote resettlement. Essential services, including electricity, are terminated in the communities where the vote reaches a threshold of 90-per-cent. In 2013, the compensation was boosted from $100,000 to $270,000 per household.

Despite a community voting in favour, state-assisted relocation has been refused in some settlements, where the cost for compensation exceeds the amount saved in services cut. Even if Nippers Harbour voted with a majority of 98%, the government has declared that the consequences to the economy would outweigh the benefits.

Since 2000, nine communities have relocated — Great Harbour Deep (2002), Petites (2003), Big Brook (2004), Grand Bruit (2010), Round Harbour (2016), William's Harbour (2017), Snook's Arm (2018) and Little Bay Islands (2019).

In 2021, the provincial government's Community Relocation Policy was changed lowering the vote required for relocation from 90 percent to 75 percent.

Following the policy change, in 2021 Francois voted against resettlement. In 2023, Gaultois voted against resettlement.

In 2025, the last 4 residents of the Tilt Cove, a town famous for its small population, announced that they'd all accept resettlement.

== In art ==
The social change caused by resettlement has appeared in some works of literature and music. The song "The Government Game" by the Newfoundland writer Al Pittman describes the issue, with lyrics such as "It's surely a sad sight, their movin' around,/ A-wishin they still lived by the cod-fishin' ground;/ But there's no goin' back now, there's nothing to gain,/ Now that they've played in the government game." The song "Out From St Leonards" also describes the resettlement, noting how residents left "with their houses in tow" by physically shipping buildings to their new homes. His best-known play West Moon is set in a resettled outport, where the ghosts of the dead lament the abandonment of their home.

Canadian folk singer Stan Rogers, although born in Ontario, had strong roots in the Maritimes and wrote many songs about the effects of resettlement. His first studio album, Fogarty's Cove, deals extensively with the topic.

The resettlement of an outport community is a focal point of Newfoundland author Michael Crummey's 2014 novel Sweetland, and its theatrical feature film adaptation Sweetland.

Newfoundland-based photographer April MacDonald has extensively documented the legacy of homes and villages abandoned by resettled Newfoundlanders.

The 2026 Netflix limited series "Below" is set in a small Newfoundland community in the midst of a resettlement debate.

== See also ==
- History of Newfoundland and Labrador
- Collapse of the Atlantic northwest cod fishery
- Newfoundland outport
