= Below (miniseries) =

2026 Canadian miniseries

- Release poster
- Genre: Supernatural; Mystery thriller
- Created by: Jesse McKeown
- Showrunner: Jesse McKeown
- Starring: Josh Hartnett; Mackenzie Davis; Charlie Heaton; Ruby Stokes; Kaleb Horn; Rohan Campbell; Willow Kean
- Music by: Mark Korven
- Country of origin: Canada
- Original language: English
- No. of episodes: 6

Production
- Executive producers: Jesse McKeown; Jessica Rhoades; Chris Hatcher; Josh Hartnett; Jamie Childs; Louise Sutton; Sharon Hall
- Producer: Allison White
- Cinematography: William Baldy; Guy Godfree; Bobby Shore
- Editors: Matthew Tabern; Matthew Hannam; Mike Phillips; Jonathan Eagan
- Running time: 37–47 minutes
- Production companies: Pacesetter Productions; Paddy Wagon Pictures

Original release
- Network: Netflix
- Release: October 8, 2026

Below is a 2026 Canadian thriller television miniseries created by Jesse McKeown and starring Josh Hartnett, Mackenzie Davis, and Charlie Heaton. It premiered on Netflix on October 8, 2026. The series received generally positive reviews from critics.

== Premise ==
When the remote Newfoundland town of Snook's Arm is terrorized by a mysterious sea creature, a hard-bitten fisherman must fight to protect his family, his community, and his vanishing way of life.

== Cast and characters ==
=== Main ===
- Josh Hartnett as Calvin Penney, a fisherman and iceberg harvester in Snook's Arm
- Mackenzie Davis as Dr. Fonda Howander, a marine biologist at the Seal Cove Ocean Science Centre. McKeown based her on real-life marine biologist Dr. Annie Mercier.
- Charlie Heaton as Wade Penney, Calvin's oldest son
- Ruby Stokes as Mary Penney, Calvin's daughter who attends a university in Montreal
- Kaleb Horn as Noah Townsend, Mary's boyfriend from Montreal
- Rohan Campbell as Jay Penney, Calvin's youngest son who works in Alberta
- Willow Kean as Ruth Penney, the harbourmaster in Snook's Arm and Calvin's older sister

=== Recurring ===
- Mary Walsh as Linda Best, the Mayor of Snook's Arm who also works as a bartender
- Natasha Henstridge as Jan Hicks, a potter who is the local Resettlement Liaison Officer with a secret of her own
- Joshua Close as Jaxon Noseworthy, a Fisheries and Oceans Canada officer in Snook's Arm
- Stephen Oates as Barry Pike, Dr. Howander's colleague
- Josh Cruddas as Connor Kopecko, a loan shark that Jay owes money to
- Matthew Worko as Mo Abdullahi, Connor's associate
- Marthe Bernard as Maggie Budgell, Walton's daughter who was hallucinated as an "old hag"

=== Guest ===
- Joel Thomas Hynes as Jerry Biles, a rival iceberg harvester of Calvin
- Darrin Baker as Keith Pratt, an Airbnb guest staying with Calvin and Candice-Marie's husband
- Zerha Leverman as Candice-Marie Pratt, an Airbnb guest staying with Calvin and Keith's wife
- Tantoo Cardinal as Anik, a contact of Dr. Howander
- David Wenham as Steve Bruner, the commander of the RSV Sir John Franklin
- Alexander Karim as Dr. Hugo Sayed, a legendary marine biologist and member of Bruner's crew
- Jeff Yung as Jojo, the helmsman for Bruner's crew
- Shawn Doyle as Walton Budgell, an old childhood friend of Calvin
- Cathy Jones as Irene Tulk, a resident of Snook's Arm and a B&B host for Connor and Mo
- Andy Jones as Churrance Budgell, Walton's father and Maggie's grandfather
- Frank Moore as Jim Crocker, a prominent member of the Crockers, one of Newfoundland's oldest merchant-class families that have power over Snook's Arm and other fishing villages

== Episodes ==
No.	Title	Directed by	Written by	Original release date
1	"Come Home Year"	Jamie Childs	Jesse McKeown	October 8, 2026
In 1986, a young Calvin Penney watches his father die while saving the family from a sea creature as they resettle from Little Pot Rock to Snook's Arm. Forty years later, Calvin faces a new government resettlement offer, backed by the influential Crocker family, which the town will decide by vote. While harvesting iceberg ice to sell to a vodka distiller, Calvin brings a contaminated sample to marine researcher Dr. Fonda Howander, who suspects a link to his childhood encounter. His children Mary and Jay return home for the summer, and a massive iceberg appears offshore. That night, Calvin's son Wade and local fisherman Jerry go out to harvest ice from it. Their boat is attacked and Jerry is killed, leaving Wade clinging to a buoy.
2	"Crown and Anchor"	Jamie Childs	Jesse McKeown	October 8, 2026
Calvin tells the town that Jerry died when the iceberg collapsed, keeping the creature secret. Wade claims to remember nothing of the attack but develops an unquenchable thirst, a circular bite mark on his back, and a nightmare in which an old woman pins him to his bed. Fonda identifies the bite as belonging to a giant squid. Jay, who is being threatened over unpaid debts, grows close to resettlement officer Jan. After learning that several local fish farms have reported heavy losses, Calvin and Fonda visit the farm of a missing fisherman named Pittman. They find footage of the Airbnb couple and the moose that was found earlier being grabbed into the water by the creature. Calvin races to warn residents at a town garden party to stay away from the shore.
3	"Sir John Franklin"	Helen Shaver	Perry Chafe	October 8, 2026
Wade encounters the Sir John Franklin, a vessel carrying conservationist Steve and marine biologist Dr. Hugo Sayed, who are searching for an undiscovered species of cephalopod. Fonda's warning about the giant squid is met with skepticism at a town meeting. Calvin offers to guide Steve's crew himself, angering Wade, who storms off. Sayed confirms Fonda's theory that the squid is ancient and has claimed the iceberg as its territory. Calvin learns that Jay owes money and has voted in favour of resettlement. Meanwhile, residents begin showing signs of extreme thirst after consuming ice from the bay, and Fonda returns to find the Ocean Science Centre ransacked.
4	"The Ocean Will Have Us All"	Helen Shaver	Karen Walton	October 8, 2026
Aboard the Sir John Franklin, Calvin insists the creature must be killed, while Steve wants it captured alive. Sayed wounds the squid with a tracking shot. In Snook's Arm, an outbreak of extreme thirst spreads through town, and the afflicted, including Noah, are gathered in the town hall, where he proposes to Mary. At gunpoint, Steve forces Calvin to join him and Sayed in a submersible. The squid, having bitten off its own tracked arm, attacks and overturns the vessel. Sayed shoots Steve before being killed by the creature. Calvin surfaces and washes ashore, where three figures watch him from a distance.
5	"Little Pot Rock"	Stephen Dunn	Jesse McKeown	October 8, 2026
Calvin wakes on the supposedly abandoned island of Little Pot Rock and finds Wade there, along with his old friend Walton and Walton's family, who stayed behind during the 1986 resettlement. They call the squid "Mother" and believe it provides fish in exchange for offerings. Calvin finds his father's grave and discovers a Crocker mining permit, learning that the family is pushing resettlement to access copper and cobalt deposits. In Snook's Arm, Jay survives a car crash into the water after his creditors abduct him, and Fonda finds a baby squid in a block of ice, realizing the iceberg is the creature's nest. Suspecting Walton plans to sacrifice Wade, Calvin sets fire to the house and escapes with his son.
6	"The Unfathering Deep"	Jamie Childs	Jesse McKeown & Natty Zavitz	October 8, 2026
Calvin and Wade return to find Snook's Arm under military evacuation. Jan is revealed to be the daughter of Jim Crocker who supports a planned airstrike on the iceberg. Knowing the iceberg holds the squid's nest, Calvin, his family and Fonda devise a plan to move it out of the harbour. Mary and Wade break apart the ice with gunfire while Calvin tows the nest section away. The strike is called off when the commanding officer refuses to fire with a civilian in range. Calvin and the squid share a look recalling their first encounter forty years earlier, and the creature dies after releasing its eggs. A year later, Calvin runs a brewing business and Wade commands his boat until the two spot another giant iceberg offshore.

== Production ==
=== Development ===
The six-episode limited series was ordered by Netflix in February 2025 with Jesse McKeown serving as creator, writer, and showrunner. McKeown believed that Newfoundland would "be a great place for something big and something kind of epic" given its rugged coastlines and close-knit communities. In choosing to focus on a mysterious sea creature, McKeown cited the province's local supernatural legends:

Folks here have been dealing with unexplained phenomena and tragic events for hundreds of years. [...] Killer storms. Maritime disasters. The collapse of the cod fishery. People going hungry. Surviving the winter here can be a horror movie in and of itself. So, these strange events fit into a long history of unimaginable difficulties.

Other writers of the series include Karen Walton, Perry Chafe and Natty Zavitz. Jamie Child, Helen Shaver, Stephen Dunn served as directors of the series. McKeown, Childs, Jessica Rhoades, Chris Hatcher, Louise Sutton, Sharon Hall served as executive producers of the series.

=== Casting ===
In May 2025, it was announced that Josh Hartnett had been tapped for the lead role of the series, in addition to executive producing. In June 2025, Mackenzie Davis was cast opposite Hartnett. In July 2025, Charlie Heaton, Natasha Henstridge, Joshua Close and Rohan Campbell joined the cast. In August 2025, Willow Kean, Ruby Stokes and Kaleb Horn joined the series.

=== Filming ===
Production of the series began in June 2025. Much of the filming was done in Brigus South with the town's existing homes being made to look like other buildings such as a church and a fish plant. Although the show is set in the fictional town of Snook's Arm, it does share its name with the former Newfoundland village of Snook's Arm which was resettled in 2018.

== Release ==
The series received a preview screening in the Primetime program at the 2026 Toronto International Film Festival. All episodes were released on Netflix on October 8, 2026.

== Reception ==
The review aggregator website Rotten Tomatoes reported a 87% approval rating based on 52 critic reviews, with an average rating of 6.3/10. The website's critics consensus reads: "Below features the classic tropes of better creature features but uses its limited time wisely, ensuring all who dive in come out the other end thoroughly thrilled." Metacritic, which uses a weighted average, assigned a score of 70 out of 100 based on 17 critics, indicating "generally favorable" reviews.
