= Round Harbour, Baie Verte, Newfoundland and Labrador =

Small settlement near Baie Verte

Coordinates: 49°51′05″N 55°40′06″W

Round Harbour was a small settlement located southeast of Baie Verte, Newfoundland and Labrador. The community was entirely resettled in 2016.

== See also ==
- Baie Verte Peninsula
- List of designated places in Newfoundland and Labrador
- Resettlement (Newfoundland)
