= Garia Bay =

Bay in Newfoundland and Labrador, Canada

Coordinates: 47.683°N 58.548°W

Garia Bay is natural bay on the island of Newfoundland in the province of Newfoundland and Labrador, Canada.
