= Shoe Cove, Notre Dame Bay, Newfoundland and Labrador =

Shoe Cove
- Local service district
- Location of Shoe Cove Shoe Cove (Canada)
- Coordinates: 49.916°N 55.565°W
- Country: Canada
- Province: Newfoundland and Labrador
- Region: Newfoundland
- Census division: 8
- Census subdivision: O

Government
  - Type: Unincorporated

Population (2021)
  - Total: 16
- Time zone: UTC−03:30 (NST)
  - Summer (DST): UTC−02:30 (NDT)
- Area code: 709

Shoe Cove is a local service district in the Canadian province of Newfoundland and Labrador.

== Geography ==
Shoe Cove is in Newfoundland within Subdivision O of Division No. 8.

== Government ==
Shoe Cove is a local service district (LSD) that is governed by a committee responsible for the provision of certain services to the community. The chair of the LSD committee is Sandy Newbury.

== See also ==
- List of communities in Newfoundland and Labrador
- List of local service districts in Newfoundland and Labrador
