= La Scie Air Station =

US Air Force radar station

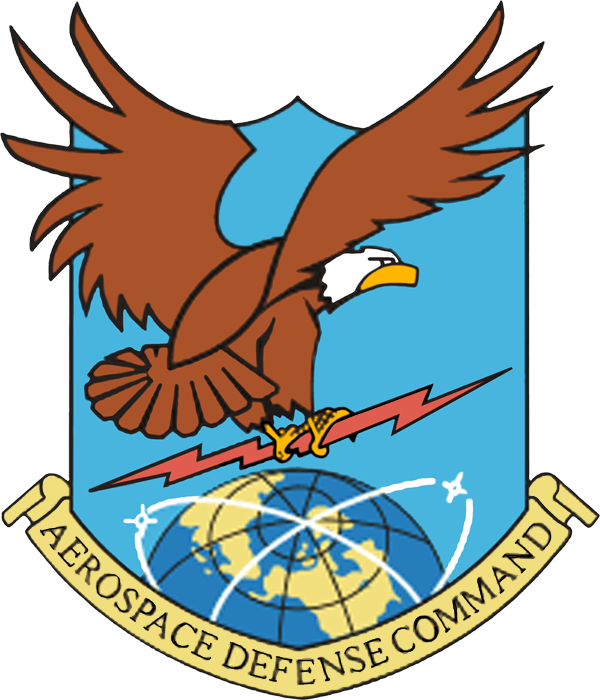
La Scie Air Station
- Part of Pinetree Line
- Newfoundland, Canada
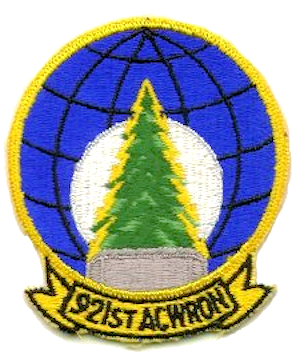
- Emblem of the 921st Aircraft Control and Warning Squadron

Site information
- Type: Radar Station
- Code: N-26B
- Controlled by: Aerospace Defense Command

Location
- Coordinates: 49°58′50″N 055°31′48″W

Site history
- Built: 1957
- Built by: United States Air Force
- In use: 1957-1961

Location of La Scie AS

La Scie Air Station (ADC ID: N-26B) was a General Surveillance Gap Filler Radar station in the Canadian province of Newfoundland and Labrador, It was located 210 miles (340 km) east-northeast of St.John's, Near La Scie. It was closed in 1961.

== History ==
The site was established in 1957 as a staffed Gap Filler radar station, built by the United States Air Force, under operational control of Saint Anthony Air Station and part of Pinetree Line of Ground-Control Intercept (GCI) radar sites.

The station was assigned to Aerospace Defense Command in 1957, and was given designation "N-26B" (later C-26B). Aerospace Defense Command stationed the 642d Aircraft Control and Warning Squadron at the station in 1957. It operated an AN/FPS-14 Gap Filler search radar.

As a staffed Gap Filler base, the 921st's role was to guide interceptor aircraft toward unidentified intruders picked up on the unit's radar scopes. These interceptors were assigned to the 64th Air Division at Goose AFB, Labrador.

== USAF units and assignments ==
Units:

- 921st Aircraft Control and Warning Squadron,

Assigned to Air Defense Command, 1 April 1957
Discontinued 1961

Assignments:

- 4731st Air Defense Group, 1 April 1957
- Goose Air Defense Sector, 6 June 1960

== See also ==
- List of USAF Aerospace Defense Command General Surveillance Radar Stations
