= Interstate 410 (disambiguation) =

Interstate 410 is a loop around San Antonio, Texas.

Interstate 410 may also refer to:

- Interstate 10 in Arizona, a portion of which was formerly known as I-410
- Interstate 410 (Baton Rouge, Louisiana), a cancelled loop through the Baton Rouge metropolitan area partially retained as I-110
- Interstate 410 (New Orleans, Louisiana), a cancelled southern bypass of the New Orleans metropolitan area known as the Dixie Freeway
