= Woodstock, Newfoundland and Labrador =

Woodstock
- Town
- Interactive map of Woodstock
- Coordinates: 49°57′57″N 55°53′30″W
- Country: Canada
- Province: Newfoundland and Labrador

Population (2021)
  - Total: 195
- Time zone: UTC-3:30 (Newfoundland Time)
  - Summer (DST): UTC-2:30 (Newfoundland Daylight)
- Forward sortation area: A0K
- Area code: 709
- Highways: Route 417

Woodstock is a town in the Canadian province of Newfoundland and Labrador. The town had a population of 195 in 2021, up from 190 in the Canada 2016 Census.

== Demographics ==
In the 2021 Census of Population conducted by Statistics Canada, Woodstock had a population of 195 living in 90 of its 97 total private dwellings, a change of 2.6% from its 2016 population of 190. With a land area of 10.05 km^{2} (3.88 sq mi), it had a population density of 19.4/km^{2} (50.3/sq mi) in 2021.

== See also ==
- List of cities and towns in Newfoundland and Labrador
