= Garia, Newfoundland and Labrador =

Abandoned community in Newfoundland, Canada

Coordinates: 47°39′7″N 58°32′32″W

Location of Garia in Newfoundland

Historical populations
Year	Pop.
1836	12
1857	129
1869	195
1874	55
1891	29
1911	6

Garia was a small town located in Garia Bay on the south coast of Newfoundland and Labrador. The origin of the town's name is probably from the French word 'gare'. The first record of the existence of this community was in 1765 when James Cook recorded one fishing stage in the area. The first record of permanent inhabitants was in the 1836 census when 12 inhabitants were living in the town. The population peaked in 1869 at 195. In 1873 approximately three-quarters of the population left for work on Anticosti Island, leaving only 55 inhabitants by 1874. The population continued to decline until the community was abandoned sometime after 1911.

== See also ==
- List of communities in Newfoundland and Labrador
- List of ghost towns in Newfoundland and Labrador
