= Sheppardville, Newfoundland and Labrador =

Sheppardville
- Local service district / designated place
- Location of Sheppardville Sheppardville (Canada)
- Coordinates: 49.44°N 56.424°W
- Country: Canada
- Province: Newfoundland and Labrador
- Region: Newfoundland
- Census division: 8
- Census subdivision: C

Government
  - Type: Unincorporated

Area
  - Land: 18.52 km^{2} (7.15 sq mi)

Population (2016)
  - Total: 85
- Time zone: UTC−03:30 (NST)
  - Summer (DST): UTC−02:30 (NDT)
- Area code: 709

Sheppardville is a local service district and designated place in the Canadian province of Newfoundland and Labrador.

== Geography ==
Sheppardville is in Newfoundland within Subdivision C of Division No. 8.

== Demographics ==
As a designated place in the 2016 Census of Population conducted by Statistics Canada, Sheppardville recorded a population of 85 living in 35 of its 40 total private dwellings, a change of 10.4% from its 2011 population of 77. With a land area of 18.52 km^{2} (7.15 sq mi), it had a population density of 4.6/km^{2} (11.9/sq mi) in 2016.

== Government ==
Sheppardville is a local service district (LSD) that is governed by a committee responsible for the provision of certain services to the community. The chair of the LSD committee is Gordon Sheppard.

== See also ==
- Newfoundland and Labrador Route 410
- List of designated places in Newfoundland and Labrador
- List of local service districts in Newfoundland and Labrador
