= Brent's Cove =

Town in Newfoundland and Labrador

- Town
- Location of Brent's Cove in Newfoundland
- Coordinates: 49°56′07.87″N 55°42′44.77″W
- Country: Canada
- Province: Newfoundland and Labrador

Government
  - Mayor: Jordan Haas

Area
  - Land: 1.02 km^{2} (0.39 sq mi)

Population (2021)
  - Total: 119
  - Density: 153.6/km^{2} (398/sq mi)
- Time zone: UTC-3:30 (Newfoundland Time)
  - Summer (DST): UTC-2:30 (Newfoundland Daylight)
- Area code: 709
- Highways: Route 414

Brent's Cove is a town in the Canadian province of Newfoundland and Labrador.

== Demographics ==
In the 2021 Census of Population conducted by Statistics Canada, Brent's Cove had a population of 119 living in 64 of its 84 total private dwellings, a change of −24.2% from its 2016 population of 157. With a land area of 1.02 km^{2} (0.39 sq mi), it had a population density of 116.7/km^{2} (302.2/sq mi) in 2021.

== See also ==
- List of cities and towns in Newfoundland and Labrador
