= Middle Arm, Baie Verte Peninsula, Newfoundland and Labrador =

Middle Arm
- Town
- Location of Middle Arm in Newfoundland
- Coordinates: 49°42′17″N 56°05′32″W
- Country: Canada
- Province: Newfoundland and Labrador

Population (2021)
  - Total: 443
- Time zone: UTC-3:30 (Newfoundland Time)
  - Summer (DST): UTC-2:30 (Newfoundland Daylight)
- Area code: 709
- Highways: Route 413

Middle Arm is a village in the Canadian province of Newfoundland and Labrador. It is located on the northern shore of an inlet of Notre Dame Bay in the north-central part of Newfoundland.

The town had a population of 443 in the Canada 2021 Census.

== Demographics ==
In the 2021 Census of Population conducted by Statistics Canada, Middle Arm had a population of 443 living in 175 of its 192 total private dwellings, a change of −6.5% from its 2016 population of 474. With a land area of 24.93 km^{2} (9.63 sq mi), it had a population density of 17.8/km^{2} (46.0/sq mi) in 2021.

== See also ==
- Baie Verte Peninsula
- List of cities and towns in Newfoundland and Labrador
