= Westport, Newfoundland and Labrador =

Coordinates: 49.783°N 56.633°W

Westport
- Town
- Interactive map of Westport
- Country: Canada
- Province: Newfoundland and Labrador

Population (2021)
  - Total: 185
- Time zone: UTC-3:30 (Newfoundland Time)
  - Summer (DST): UTC-2:30 (Newfoundland Daylight)
- Postal code: A0K 5R0
- Area code: 709
- Highways: Route 411
- Westport Cove Lighthouse
- Constructed: 1906
- Construction: structural wood (tower)
- Height: 3 m (9.8 ft)
- Shape: octagonal truncated tower with lantern
- Markings: White
- Power source: solar power
- Operator: Canadian Coast Guard
- Focal height: 10 m (33 ft)
- Lens: sixth-order dioptric lens
- Range: 7 nmi (13 km; 8.1 mi)
- Characteristic: Fl W 4s

Westport is a town in the Canadian province of Newfoundland and Labrador. The town had a population of 185 in 2021, down from 195 in the Canada 2016 Census.

== Demographics ==
In the 2021 Census of Population conducted by Statistics Canada, Westport had a population of 185 living in 84 of its 124 total private dwellings, a change of −5.1% from its 2016 population of 195. With a land area of 5.23 km^{2} (2.02 sq mi), it had a population density of 35.4/km^{2} (91.6/sq mi) in 2021.

== See also ==
- List of lighthouses in Canada
- List of cities and towns in Newfoundland and Labrador
