= Ming's Bight =

- Town
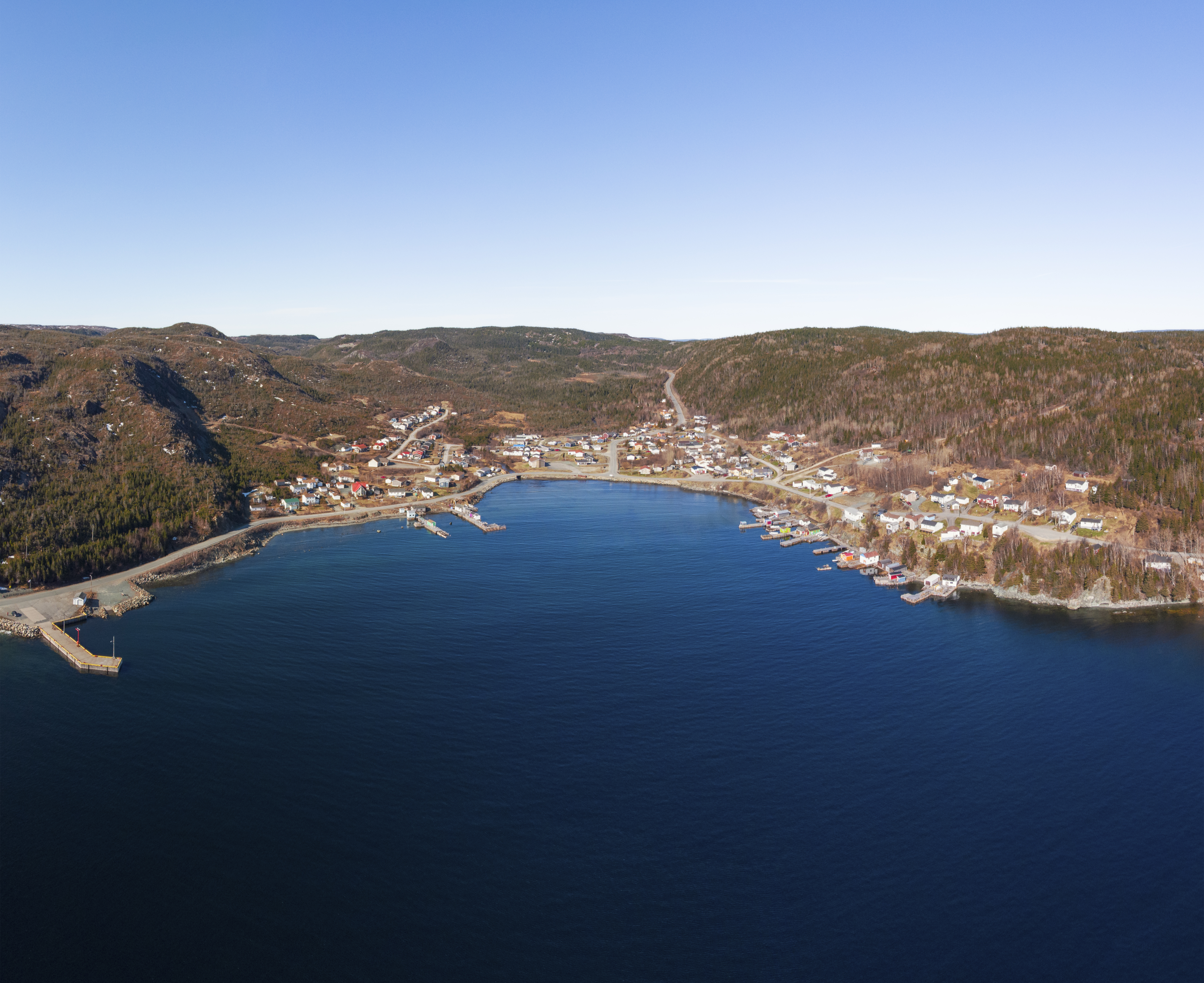
- Interactive map of Ming's Bight
- Coordinates: 49°58′35″N 56°2′48″W
- Country: Canada
- Province: Newfoundland and Labrador

Population (2021)
  - Total: 298
- Time zone: UTC-3:30 (Newfoundland Time)
  - Summer (DST): UTC-2:30 (Newfoundland Daylight)
- Area code: 709
- Highways: Route 418

Ming's Bight is a town in the Canadian province of Newfoundland and Labrador. The town had a population of 298 in 2021 Census, down from 319 in the Canada 2016 Census.

== Demographics ==
In the 2021 Census of Population conducted by Statistics Canada, Ming's Bight had a population of 298 living in 124 of its 141 total private dwellings, a change of −6.6% from its 2016 population of 319. With a land area of 3.81 km^{2} (1.47 sq mi), it had a population density of 78.2/km^{2} (202.6/sq mi) in 2021.

== See also ==
- Baie Verte, Newfoundland and Labrador
- List of cities and towns in Newfoundland and Labrador
