= Wild Cove, White Bay, Newfoundland and Labrador =

Designated place in Canada

Coordinates: 49°59′37″N 56°20′10″W

Wild Cove is a local service district and designated place in the Canadian province of Newfoundland and Labrador. It is on the Baie Verte Peninsula of the island of Newfoundland.

== Geography ==
Wild Cove, White Bay is on the island of Newfoundland within Subdivision A of Division No. 8. It is located on the western side of the peninsula along the hilly coastline of White Bay.

== Demographics ==
As a designated place in the 2016 Census of Population conducted by Statistics Canada, Wild Cove, White Bay recorded a population of 49 living in 25 of its 37 total private dwellings, a change of -25.8% from its 2011 population of 66. With a land area of 2.76 km^{2} (1.07 sq mi), it had a population density of 17.8/km^{2} (46.0/sq mi) in 2016.

== Government ==
Wild Cove, White Bay is a local service district (LSD) that is governed by a committee responsible for the provision of certain services to the community. The chair of the LSD committee is Larry Pinksen.

== Transportation ==
Roadway access to the rest of Newfoundland is provided by Route 419 (Wild Cove Road).

== See also ==
- List of communities in Newfoundland and Labrador
- List of designated places in Newfoundland and Labrador
- List of local service districts in Newfoundland and Labrador
