= Smith's Harbour =

Community in Newfoundland, Canada

Coordinates: 49.742°N 55.978°W

Location of Smith's Harbour in Newfoundland and Labrador

Smith's Harbour is a local service district and designated place in the Canadian province of Newfoundland and Labrador.

== Geography ==
Smith's Harbour is in Newfoundland within Subdivision O of Division No. 8.

== Demographics ==
As a designated place in the 2016 Census of Population conducted by Statistics Canada, Smith's Harbour recorded a population of 131 living in 52 of its 70 total private dwellings, a change of -10.3% from its 2011 population of 146. With a land area of 2.41 km^{2} (0.93 sq mi), it had a population density of 54.4/km^{2} (140.8/sq mi) in 2016.

== Government ==
Smith's Harbour is a local service district (LSD) that is governed by a committee responsible for the provision of certain services to the community. The chair of the LSD committee is Ariel Osmond.

== See also ==
- List of communities in Newfoundland and Labrador
- List of designated places in Newfoundland and Labrador
- List of local service districts in Newfoundland and Labrador
