= Fleur de Lys, Newfoundland and Labrador =

Coordinates: 50°07′20″N 56°07′55″W

Fleur de Lys
- Town
- Interactive map of Fleur de Lys
- Country: Canada
- Province: Newfoundland and Labrador

Government
  - Mayor: Joy Walsh

Population (2021)
  - Total: 207
- Time zone: UTC-3:30 (Newfoundland Time)
  - Summer (DST): UTC-2:30 (Newfoundland Daylight)
- Area code: 709
- Highways: Route 410

Fleur de Lys (/ˌflɜːrdəˈliː/) is a town in the Canadian province of Newfoundland and Labrador. The town had a population of 207 in the Canada 2021 Census. Fleur de Lys is located approximately 26 km north of Baie Verte.

== Demographics ==
In the 2021 Census of Population conducted by Statistics Canada, Fleur de Lys had a population of 207 living in 116 of its 159 total private dwellings, a change of −15.2% from its 2016 population of 244. With a land area of 39.54 km^{2} (15.27 sq mi), it had a population density of 5.2/km^{2} (13.6/sq mi) in 2021.

== See also ==
- Baie Verte Peninsula
