= Purbeck's Cove =

Coordinates: 49.747°N 56.647°W

Location of Purbeck's Cove in Newfoundland and Labrador

Purbeck's Cove is a settlement in Newfoundland and Labrador.
