= Tilt Cove =

- Town
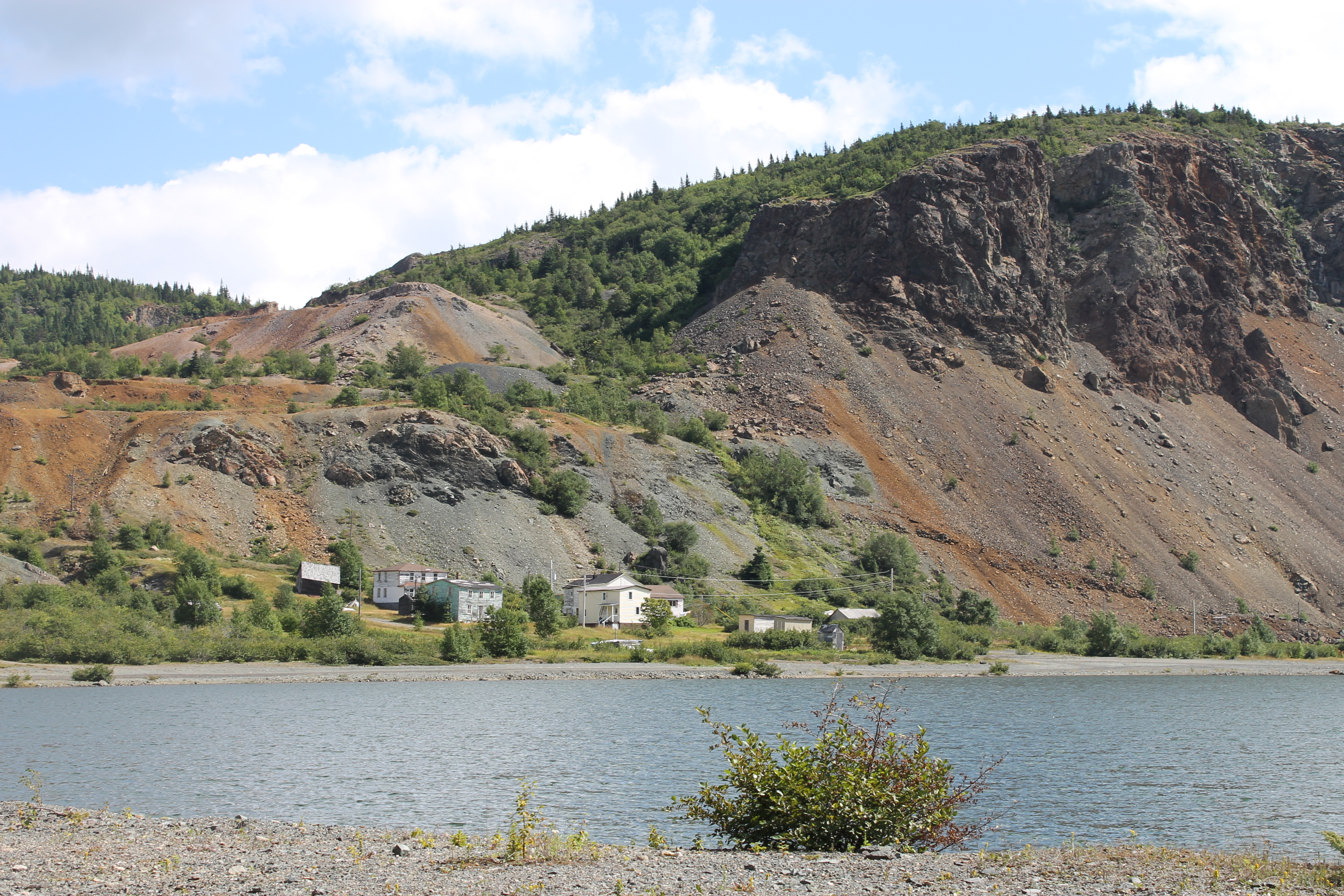

- Location of Tilt Cove in Newfoundland
- Coordinates: 49°53′10″N 55°37′37″W
- Country: Canada
- Province: Newfoundland and Labrador

Population (2021)
  - Total: 4
- Time zone: UTC-3:30 (Newfoundland Time)
  - Summer (DST): UTC-2:30 (Newfoundland Daylight)
- Area code: 709
- Highways: Route 414

Tilt Cove (/tɪlt koʊv/) is a town located southeast of Baie Verte on Notre Dame Bay and was founded in 1813. With an official population of 5 at the 2021 census, Tilt Cove is known as "Canada's smallest town." A source of gold, copper, and zinc ores, Tilt Cove was the site of the first mine in Newfoundland. The Tilt Cove mine opened in 1864 and "was soon employing several hundred men at good wages". Postal service was established in 1869.

The population was 1,370 in 1901 but had fallen to 57 by 1956.

In November 2023, the four permanent residents of Tilt Cove, two married couples, voted in favour of relocating. They relocated in 2025.

== History ==
Tilt Cove was settled in 1813 or earlier by George and Mary Winsor from Plymouth, Devon, England as a tiny fishing settlement of around 25 people. In 1857, Smith McKay discovered rich deposits of copper ore and in 1864, in conjunction with C.F. Bennett, he began mining operations. In the 1880s, the Tilt Cove mine changed ownership to the Cape Copper Company. In 1916, the population peaked to 1500.

Tilt Cove (date unknown)

In the late afternoon of 11 March 1912, an avalanche at Tilt Cove killed five people and injured another five. The victims' funerals took place on 14 March 1912.

The mines closed in 1920, driving the population down to around 100. It remained low until the mines were reopened in the 1950s by Canadian mining promoter Matthew James Boylen in response to a provincial government policy encouraging mineral exploration. Mining stopped again around a decade later.

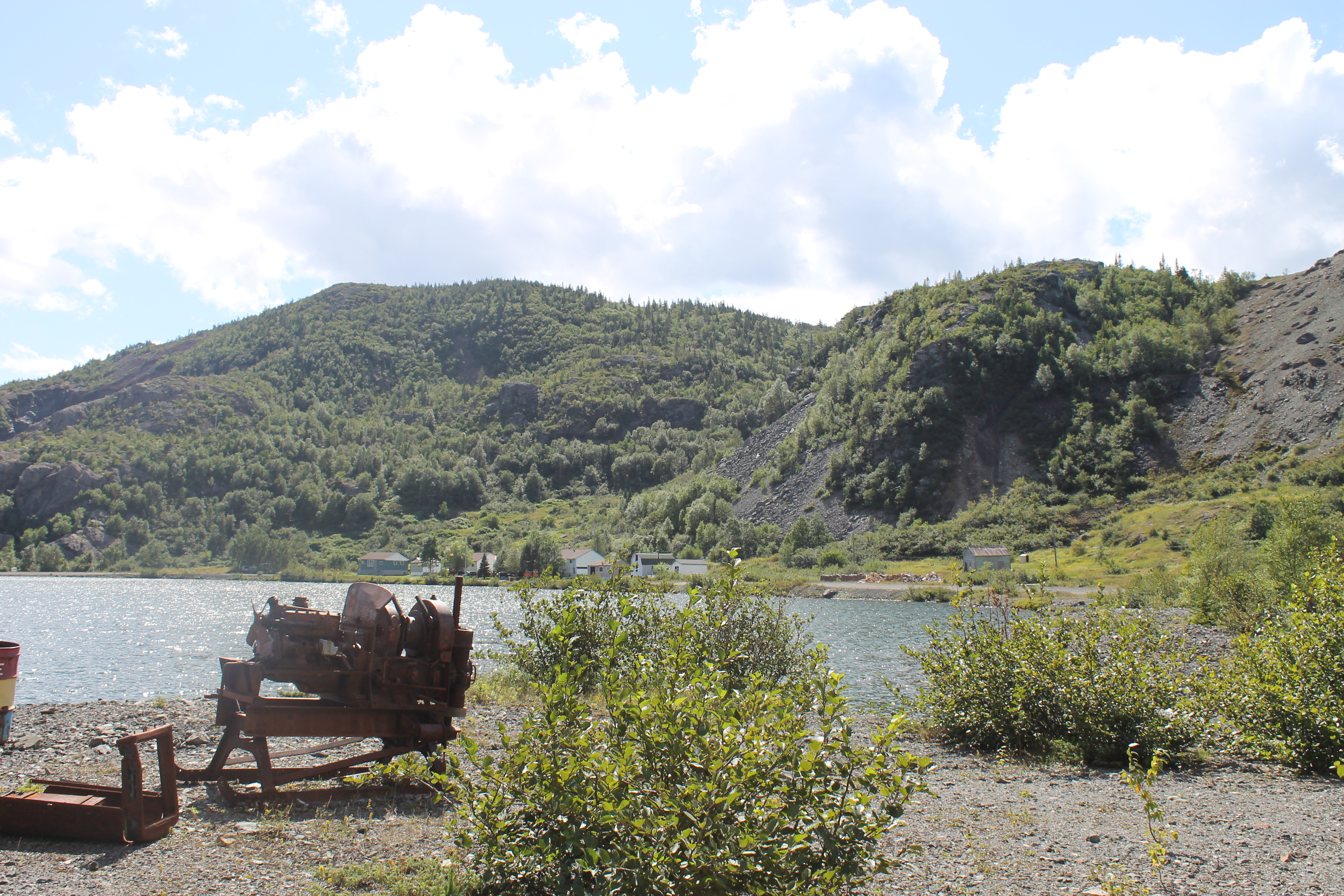
Tilt Cove, looking south

=== Recent mining activity ===
On 7 July 1999, Cabo Mining entered into an agreement with the Tilt Cove Mining Company, resulting in Cabo Mining acquiring a 100% interest in the Tilt Cove property subject to a 3% NSR by paying a combination of shares and 1.27 million Canadian dollars to Tilt Cove.

On 23 May 2008, surface sampling returned gold and copper assays (up to 69.39 g/t and 10.4% respectively) from surface grab samples.

The current owner of the Tilt Cove mine is Metals Creek, which negotiated terms to process surface material remaining at Tilt Cove: "Transportation of the Tilt Cove stockpile to the Nugget Pond Mill began on June 7th, 2011 with subsequent processing of the ore beginning on June 10th, 2011. 20,882 wet metric tonnes of material was processed at a grade of 1.79 g/t gold. This processing resulted in a $173,372 Net smelter return payment from Rambler Mining to Metals Creek Resources as well as roughly 20,000 to 30,000 tonnes of material still remaining in the stockpile." Ongoing work was in progress to produce a 3D model of the Tilt Cove Mine in 2014.

=== Relocation efforts ===
In March 2019, the remaining residents of Tilt Cove, two married couples, applied to the provincial government for assistance in relocating away from the area. They were denied and appealed the decision with evidence of significant maintenance needs for the settlement's only road.

In November 2023, the province approved the relocation assistance after both couples voted 100% in resettling. In 2025, the two couples, siblings who married siblings, moved to King's Point, further south on Green Bay, where they have family and were able to find rental accommodations. After their departure, the province plans to shut down power supply to the town, despite there still being some part-time residents.

== Demographics ==
In the 2021 Census of Population conducted by Statistics Canada, Tilt Cove had a population of 5 living in 2 of its 9 total private dwellings, a change of 0% from 2016. With a land area of 3.1 km^{2} (1.2 sq mi), it had a population density of 1.6/km^{2} (4.2/sq mi) in 2021.

== Attractions ==
The Queen of Swansea Memorial was erected in Tilt Cove in memory of the passengers and crew who perished on Gull Island following the 1867 sinking of the vessel Queen of Swansea, the ship which transported copper ore from Tilt Cove to Wales.

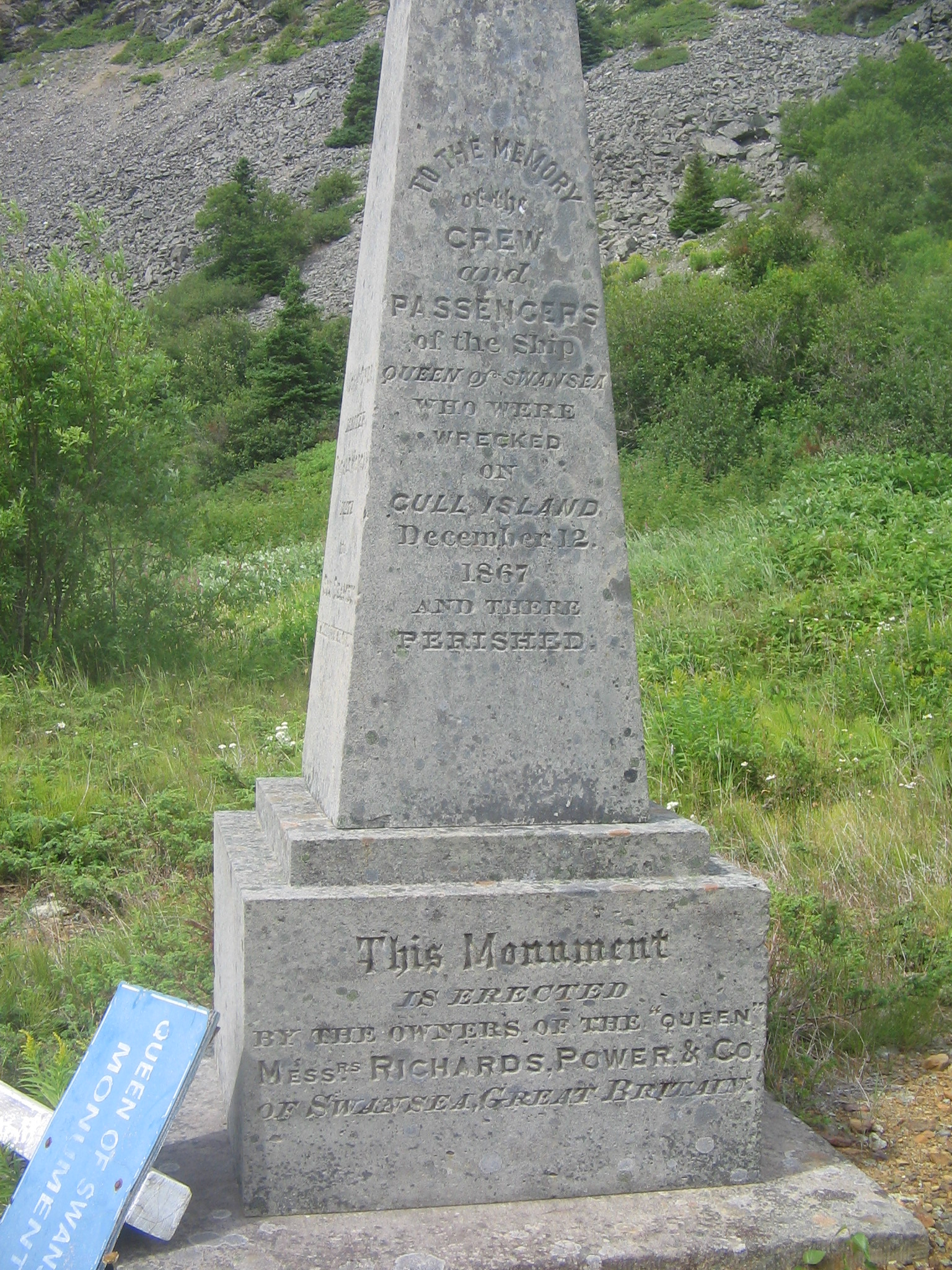
The monument to the Queen of Swansea shipwreck

A resident maintained a small museum about Tilt Cove's history in his home.

== See also ==
- List of cities and towns in Newfoundland and Labrador
