= Seal Cove, White Bay, Newfoundland and Labrador =

Seal Cove
- Town
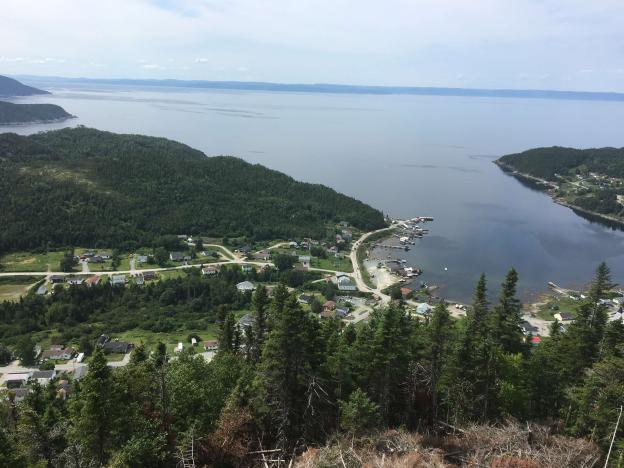
- View of Seal Cove seen from the Bond Site Lookout

- Location of Seal Cove in Newfoundland
- Coordinates: 49°55′53″N 56°22′24″W
- Country: Canada
- Province: Newfoundland and Labrador

Population (2021)
  - Total: 281
- Time zone: UTC-3:30 (Newfoundland Time)
  - Summer (DST): UTC-2:30 (Newfoundland Daylight)
- Area code: 709
- Highways: Route 412

Seal Cove is a town in the Canadian province of Newfoundland and Labrador, located on White Bay. The town has had a stable population of 281 (2021 census).

Seal Cove is a picturesque small town located on the White Bay shore of the Baie Verte Peninsula in the northern portion of Southern Arm. The inhabitants work mainly in fishing, mining and forestry industries. There is a small general store, school, and church.

== Demographics ==
In the 2021 Census of Population conducted by Statistics Canada, Seal Cove had a population of 281 living in 131 of its 167 total private dwellings, a change of −7.3% from its 2016 population of 303. With a land area of 10.79 km^{2} (4.17 sq mi), it had a population density of 26.0/km^{2} (67.5/sq mi) in 2021.

== Bond Site Lookout ==
Seal Cove is home to The Bond Site Lookout, named in honor of Dr. Bond, the founder of the lookout and constructor of the initial trail in 1981. Dr. Bond was a dentist working at the Baie Verte Hospital who had a passion for hand gliding. He discovered the hill while visiting friends in the town of Seal Cove. In the fall and winter of 1981, he constructed a trail to the top of the hill. On June 19, 1982, Dr. Bond took his first flight off the hill while residents of the town looked on in admiration. According to residents he glided for 15–20 minutes before landing in the local baseball field.

In the late 1980s the Town hired students to construct steps for the trail along with constructing a platform from which visitors can hand glide or admire the view. When planning a trip to Seal Cove's Bond Site be prepared for a steep climb of around 200 ft from the highway parking lot. The steps and platform are maintained by the town, but hikers should take care as the local weather can weaken the wood quickly and black bears are known to frequent the area.

A bear awareness course is a must for hikers who would like to travel trails in this area.

== Gallery ==
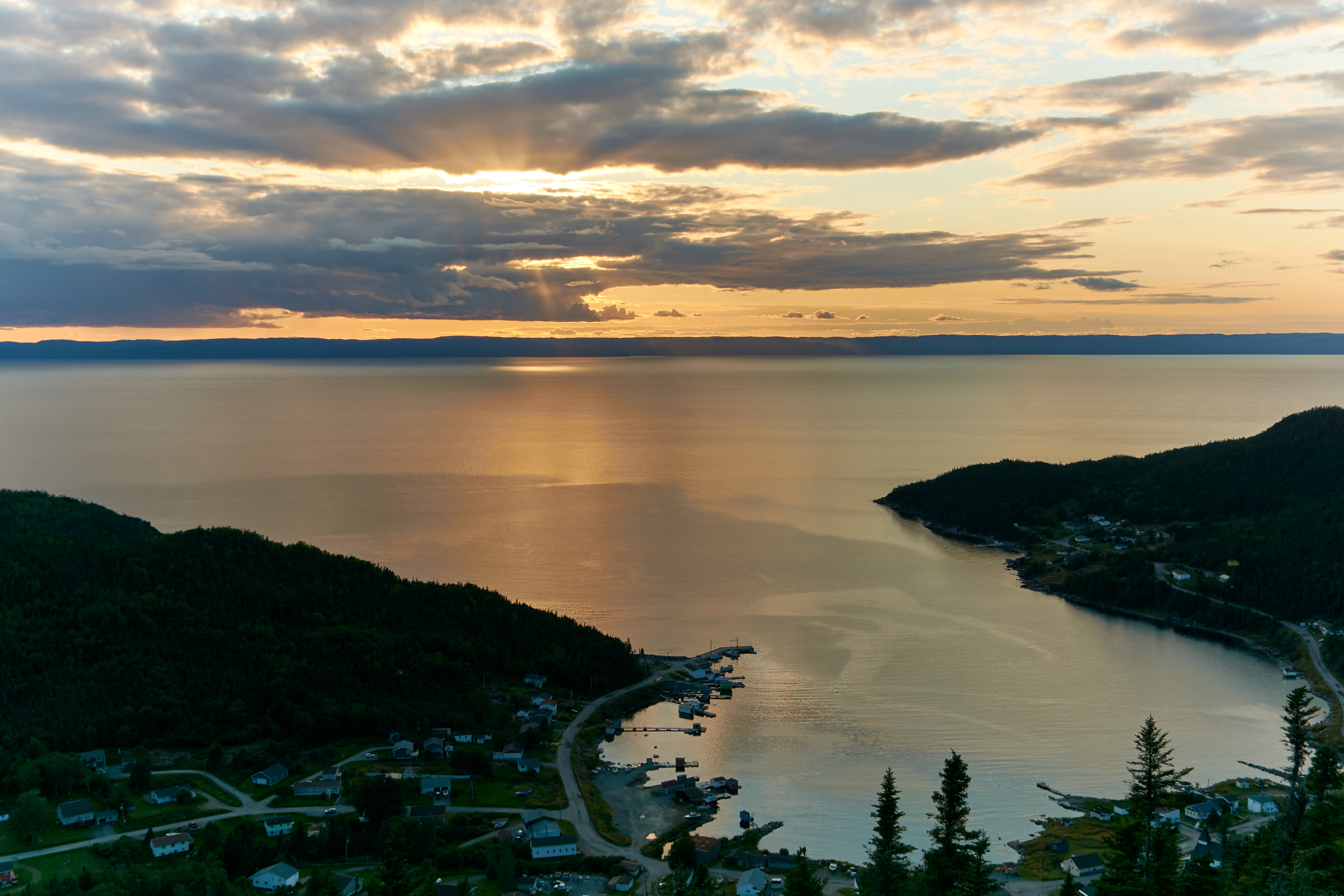
View from “The Bond Site” Lookout

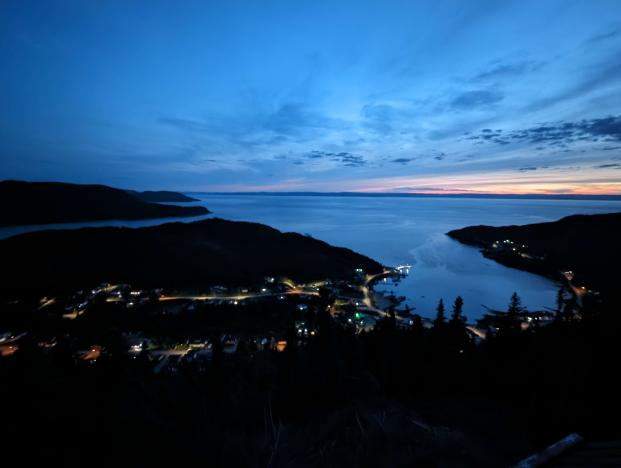
Image of the "Bond Site" view during night

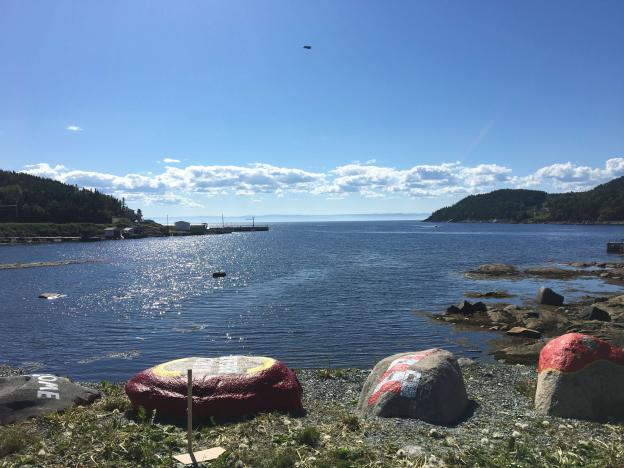
View of the sea from the public gazebo

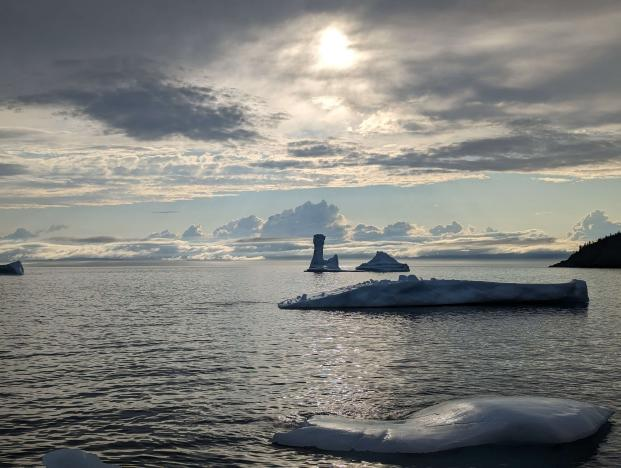
Image of an oddly shaped iceberg taken in Seal Cove

== See also ==
- List of cities and towns in Newfoundland and Labrador
