= LaScie =

Coordinates: 49°57′30″N 55°35′30″W

La Scie
- Town
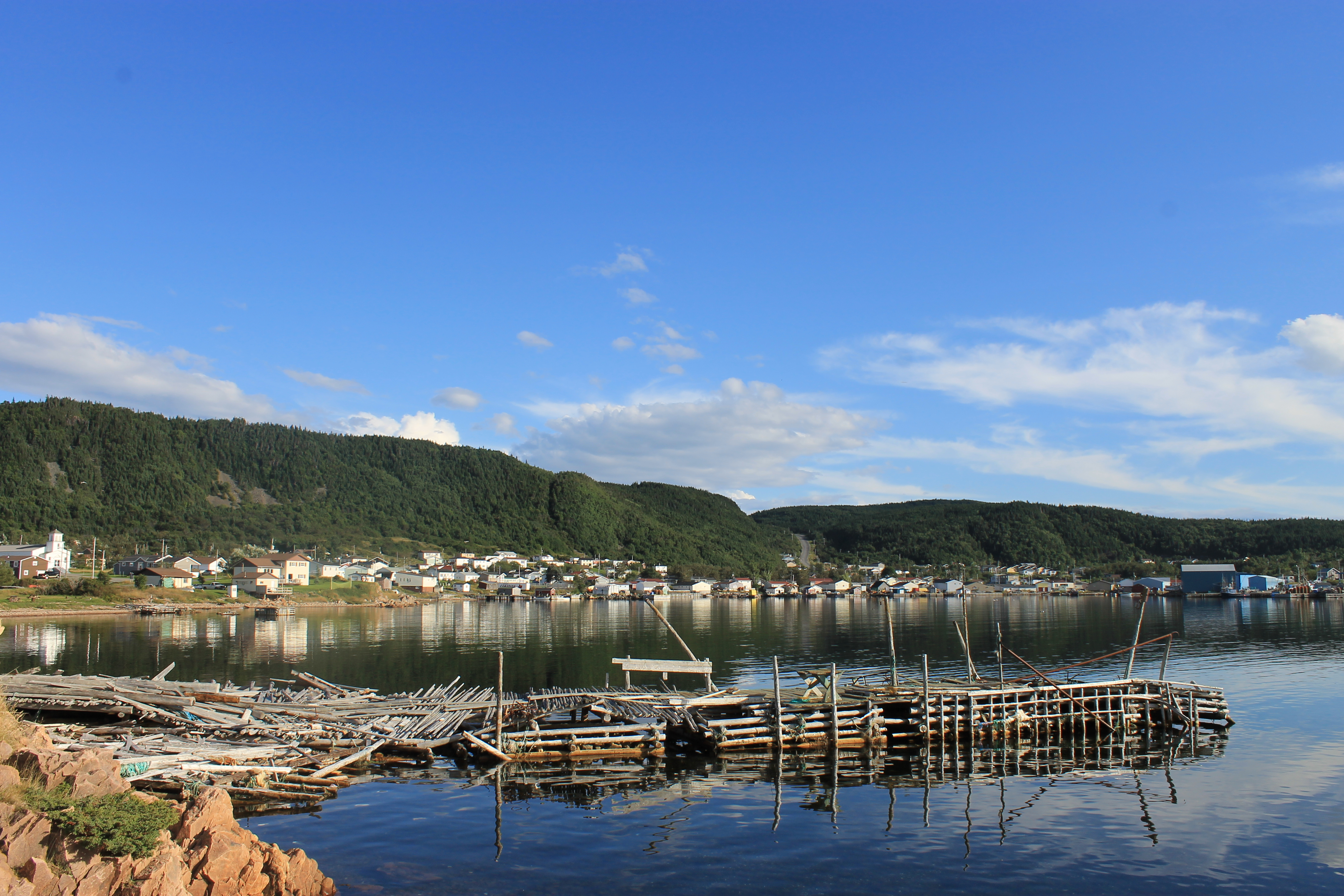

- Seal
- Interactive map of La Scie
- Country: Canada
- Province: Newfoundland and Labrador

Population (2021)
  - Total: 820
- Time zone: UTC-3:30 (Newfoundland Time)
  - Summer (DST): UTC-2:30 (Newfoundland Daylight)
- Area code: 709
- Highways: Route 414

La Scie (sometimes spelled "LaScie") is a town in the Canadian province of Newfoundland and Labrador. The town had a population of 820 in the Canada 2021 Census, down from 872 in 2016.

== History ==
The name of the town originates from French fishermen who called it La Scie, which in French means "The Saw". This is reference to the silhouette of the hills around the town which resemble the teeth of a saw blade. This is also depicted in the town's seal. LaScie was settled by Irish and English fisherman after the French relinquished their fishing rights to the French Shore in 1904. By 1911 the population had grown to 429.

The United States Air Force built and operated a radar station in the area from 1957 to 1961.

On November 7, 2020, a fire destroyed a town building which housed the community's fire hall, the local ambulance service, a library, family resource centre and council chambers.

== Demographics ==
In the 2021 Census of Population conducted by Statistics Canada, LaScie had a population of 820 living in 364 of its 407 total private dwellings, a change of −6% from its 2016 population of 872. With a land area of 29.16 km^{2} (11.26 sq mi), it had a population density of 28.1/km^{2} (72.8/sq mi) in 2021.

== See also ==
- List of cities and towns in Newfoundland and Labrador
- La Scie Air Station
