= Baie Verte, Newfoundland and Labrador =

Baie Verte
- Town
- Seal

- Location of Baie Verte in Newfoundland
- Coordinates: 49°54′31″N 56°11′41″W
- Country: Canada
- Province: Newfoundland and Labrador
- Incorporated: 1968

Government
  - Mayor: Shawn Russell

Area
  - Land: 371.09 km^{2} (143.28 sq mi)

Population (2021)
  - Total: 1,311
  - Density: 3.5/km^{2} (9.1/sq mi)
- Time zone: UTC-03:30 (NST)
  - Summer (DST): UTC-02:30 (NDT)
- Area code: 709
- Highways: Route 410; Route 412

Baie Verte (2021 Population 1,311) is a town located on the north coast of the island portion of the Canadian province of Newfoundland and Labrador on the Baie Verte Peninsula.

The French named the area for its greenness, "green bay."

== Geography ==
Baie Verte is one of 42 communities that make up the Emerald Zone which is located in the North Central portion of Newfoundland. Baie Verte dates to the late 19th century, but remained a small village until the discovery of asbestos and other ore bodies of copper, lead, zinc and gold in the mid-1950s when the town underwent major expansion. Bowering Brother's steamers called in the area in the 1950s to transport the ore found here. It became a town in 1968.

The major Baie Verte fault line starts here and runs from here to Long Island Sound by way of Vermont.

=== Climate ===
Climate data for Baie Verte Coordinates 49°55′N 56°11′W; elevation: 110 m (360 ft); 1961–1990, extremes 1958–1995
Month	Jan	Feb	Mar	Apr	May	Jun	Jul	Aug	Sep	Oct	Nov	Dec	Year
Record high °C (°F)	11.1 (52.0)	10.6 (51.1)	16.0 (60.8)	20.0 (68.0)	26.7 (80.1)	32.2 (90.0)	34.0 (93.2)	32.2 (90.0)	29.0 (84.2)	23.3 (73.9)	20.0 (68.0)	14.4 (57.9)	34.0 (93.2)
Mean daily maximum °C (°F)	−3.8 (25.2)	−3.7 (25.3)	0.0 (32.0)	3.9 (39.0)	9.6 (49.3)	16.6 (61.9)	21.2 (70.2)	20.0 (68.0)	15.2 (59.4)	9.2 (48.6)	4.0 (39.2)	−1.0 (30.2)	7.6 (45.7)
Daily mean °C (°F)	−8.4 (16.9)	−8.9 (16.0)	−4.6 (23.7)	0.1 (32.2)	5.1 (41.2)	11.0 (51.8)	15.6 (60.1)	14.9 (58.8)	10.5 (50.9)	5.1 (41.2)	0.5 (32.9)	−5.0 (23.0)	3.0 (37.4)
Mean daily minimum °C (°F)	−13.1 (8.4)	−14.2 (6.4)	−9.3 (15.3)	−3.8 (25.2)	0.5 (32.9)	5.4 (41.7)	10.1 (50.2)	9.7 (49.5)	5.8 (42.4)	1.0 (33.8)	−2.9 (26.8)	−9.1 (15.6)	−1.7 (28.9)
Record low °C (°F)	−28.0 (−18.4)	−33.9 (−29.0)	−30.0 (−22.0)	−20.0 (−4.0)	−13.9 (7.0)	−5.0 (23.0)	0.0 (32.0)	−1.1 (30.0)	−3.9 (25.0)	−11.1 (12.0)	−20.0 (−4.0)	−27.8 (−18.0)	−33.9 (−29.0)
Average precipitation mm (inches)	106.7 (4.20)	83.9 (3.30)	82.1 (3.23)	70.2 (2.76)	81.6 (3.21)	91.5 (3.60)	72.3 (2.85)	103.0 (4.06)	93.2 (3.67)	105.2 (4.14)	104.5 (4.11)	106.7 (4.20)	1,100.8 (43.34)
Average rainfall mm (inches)	17.7 (0.70)	11.6 (0.46)	26.1 (1.03)	32.3 (1.27)	70.6 (2.78)	90.5 (3.56)	72.3 (2.85)	103.0 (4.06)	93.2 (3.67)	100.4 (3.95)	73.3 (2.89)	30.1 (1.19)	721.1 (28.41)
Average snowfall cm (inches)	89.0 (35.0)	74.9 (29.5)	57.0 (22.4)	37.8 (14.9)	10.2 (4.0)	0.9 (0.4)	0 (0)	0 (0)	0 (0)	4.7 (1.9)	30.1 (11.9)	75.5 (29.7)	380.1 (149.7)
Average precipitation days (≥ 0.2 mm)	12	10	11	10	12	12	12	13	15	14	13	13	147
Average rainy days (≥ 0.2 mm)	2	1	3	5	11	12	12	13	15	14	9	3	100
Average snowy days (≥ 0.2 cm)	11	9	8	6	2	trace	0	0	0	trace	5	10	51
Source: 1961-1990 Environment and Climate Change Canada

== History ==
The Baie Verte asbestos deposit was discovered in 1955, and Advocate Mines, a division of the giant Johns-Manville Company, began open-pit mining there in 1963. In the 1970s the town was gripped by a strike by asbestos miners over working conditions which lasted for 15 weeks. The Advocate mine shut down in 1981, was reopened in 1982 by Transpacific Asbestos Ltd., but closed permanently in 1990.

The Point Rousse Project is located within the Baie Verte Mining District, on the Point Rousse/Ming's Bight Peninsula. The Project covers three prospective gold trends: the Scrape Trend, the Goldenville Trend and the Deer Cove Trend. These trends have approximately 20 km of cumulative strike length and include three deposits (Pine Cove, Stog’er Tight and Argyle).

Anaconda Mining has been mining at the Pine Cove open pit mine in Baie Verte continuously since 2010, and has produced in excess of 118,028 ounces of gold.

== Demographics ==
In the 2021 Census of Population conducted by Statistics Canada, Baie Verte had a population of 1,311 living in 556 of its 647 total private dwellings, a change of −0.2% from its 2016 population of 1,313. With a land area of 371.37 km^{2} (143.39 sq mi), it had a population density of 3.5/km^{2} (9.1/sq mi) in 2021.

== Notable people ==
- Brad Brown, National Hockey League player

== See also ==
- List of cities and towns in Newfoundland and Labrador
