= Baie Verte Peninsula =

Peninsula on Newfoundland, Canada

Coordinates: 49.86°N 56.16°W

Location of Baie Verte Peninsula in Newfoundland

The Baie Verte Peninsula is a large peninsula on the north central coast of the island of Newfoundland in the Canadian province of Newfoundland and Labrador.

The Baie Verte Peninsula is a geologically complex area on the northwest coast of Newfoundland. The region is composed of multiple geological domains and has undergone extensive tectonic activity, uplift, and deformation, producing multiple unconformity surfaces. In addition, multiple phases of intrusion, some with volcanic cover sequences, add to the complexity of the geological model. The peninsula is home to many communities; the largest is Baie Verte, where Green Bay gets its name.

The Rambler area, of the Baie Verte Peninsula, has a long history of mineral exploration dating back to 1903 when local prospector Enos England first discovered the ‘England Vein’. The peninsula also contains valuable volcanogenic massive sulphide deposits, some of which have elevated gold concentrations, up to several grams per tonne locally.

The Share Foundation is a local charity that provides medical services.

== See also ==
- List of communities in Newfoundland and Labrador
- Newfoundland and Labrador Route 410

== Images ==
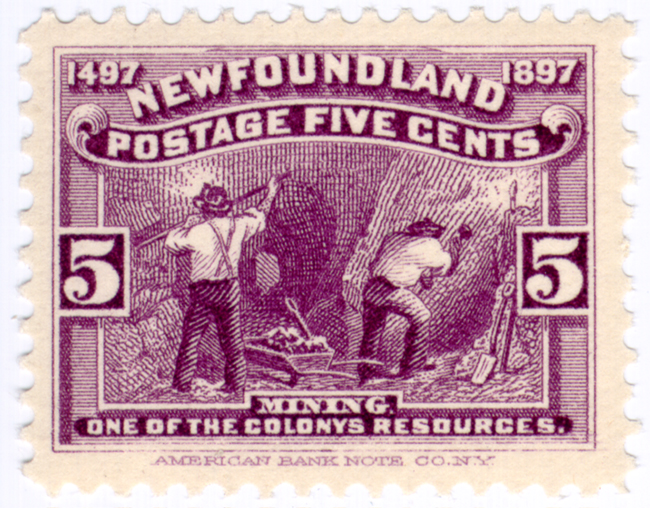
Copper mine, Tilt Cove, Baie Verte peninsula. When the mine was booming, over 5,000 people lived in the community but now only a few families live in the area.
