= 2025 Newfoundland and Labrador municipal elections =

Local elections in Canada

- October 2, 2025

Municipal elections in Newfoundland and Labrador were held on October 2, 2025. Voters in the Canadian province of Newfoundland and Labrador elected mayors, councillors, and all other elected officials in all of the province's municipalities and local service districts. Municipal elections in the province are non-partisan.

In 2024, the date of the election was changed from September 30, 2025 to avoid clashing with the National Day for Truth and Reconciliation. Municipal elections in the provincial capital of St. John's were postponed until October 8, 2025 due to the ongoing Canada Post strike. The election in Small Point-Adam's Cove-Blackhead-Broad Cove was deferred until April 14, 2026 as the town is recovering from the damage incurred by the Kingston wildfire.

== Admirals Beach ==
=== Town Council ===
Candidates	Votes	%
Garry White (X)	Acclaimed	
Richard Linehan (X)	Acclaimed	
Mildred Linehan (X)	Acclaimed	
Marion Power (X)	Acclaimed	
Michelle Dalton (X)	Acclaimed	

== Anchor Point ==
=== Town Council ===
Candidates	Votes	%
Shawn Dempster (X)	Acclaimed	
Enid Genge (X)	Acclaimed	
Oscar Genge (X)	Acclaimed	
Roland Genge (X)	Acclaimed	
Gerry Gros (X)	Acclaimed	

== Appleton ==
=== Town Council ===
Candidates	Votes	%
Garrett Watton (X)	127	15.6%
Courtney Gillingham (X)	122	15%
Ryan Steele (X)	111	13.7%
Craig Steele (X)	99	12.2%
John Hanlon	99	12.2%
Barrie Silmarie	95	11.7%
Kerri-lee Silmarie	84	10.3%
Lacey Phillips	72	8.8%

== Aquaforte ==
=== Town Council ===
Candidates	Votes	%
Elizabeth Croft (X)	Acclaimed	
Jerome Croft (X)	Acclaimed	
Deborah Hynes (X)	Acclaimed	
Earon Kavanagh (X)	Acclaimed	

== Arnold's Cove ==
=== Town Council ===
Canadiates	Votes	%
Brenda Brown (X)	Acclaimed	
John Barrett (X)	Acclaimed	
Megan Billings (X)	Acclaimed	
Derek W.B Hapgood	Acclaimed	
Thomas Osbourne	Acclaimed	
Matthew Osbourne	Acclaimed	
Linda Penney (X)	Acclaimed	

== Avondale ==
=== Town Council ===
Candidates	Votes	%
Tom Cantwell (X)	Acclaimed	
Chris Chaulk	Acclaimed	
Justin Foote	Acclaimed	
Tom Gushue	Acclaimed	
John O'Leary	Acclaimed	
Donna Phillips	Acclaimed	

== Badger ==
=== Town Council ===
Candidates	Votes	%
Dennis Butt (X)	228	14%
Neil Penton	210	12.9%
Michelle Noseworthy (X)	196	12%
Nick Blackwood (X)	170	10.4%
Ann Marie Young (X)	158	9.7%
Tiffany Maher	151	9.2%
Nicole Eddy	131	8%
Camilla Keefe	118	7.2%
Jazmin Eddy (X)	111	6.8%
Joanne Butt	82	5%
Renee Kennedy	69	4.2%

== Baie Verte ==
=== Town Council ===
Candidates	Votes	%
Jamie Seymour	388	13.7%
Amanda Cox	323	11.4%
Lorne Head	318	11.3%
Tony Decker	317	11.2%
Laurie Walker (X)	278	9.8%
Fern Downey (X)	245	8.7%
Christa Payne (X)	242	8.5%
Kim Hewlett (X)	227	8%
Stephen Mckenna	168	5.9%
Sherry Haas	99	3.5%
Madison Noble	92	3.2%
Cordell Shears	85	3%
Bradley Haas	32	0.11%

== Baine Harbour ==
=== Town Council ===
Candidates	Votes	%
Todd Kenway	52	18.5%
Carl Harris	51	18.1%
Shauna Whiffen	51	18.1%
Randy Kenway	47	16.7%
Lori Butler	46	16.3%
Hughie Reid	34	12%

== Bauline ==
Candidates	Votes	%
Christopher Dredge (X)	156	16.9%
Craig Legrow (X)	119	12.9%
Heidi Kolodniski (X)	106	11.5%
Ralph Legrow	102	11%
Neville Collins	99	10.7%
Justin Kinsella	82	8.9%
Terry Hillier (X)	72	7.8%
Kim Janes	72	7.8%
Stephen Antle	67	7.2%
Gary King	43	4.6%

== Bay Bulls ==
=== Town Council ===
Candidates	Votes	%
Ethan Williams (X)	357	20.5%
Keith O'Driscoll (X)	330	18.9%
Jonathon O'Dea	281	16.1%
Jason O'brien (X)	246	14.1%
Corey Ronayne (X)	206	11.8%
Jason Sullivan (X)	181	10.4%
David Meaney	136	7.8%

== Bay de Verde ==
=== Town Council ===
Candidates	Votes	%
Dean Potter (X)	132	13.2%
Louis Keats (X)	122	12.2%
Juanita Emberley (X)	115	11.5%
Jessica Doyle	110	11%
Scott Coish (X)	102	10.2%
Angela Doyle (X)	101	10.1%
Earl Keats	98	9.8%
Christopher Coish (X)	96	9.6%
Scott Walsh	65	6.5%
Karl Coish	56	5.6%

== Bay L'Argent ==
=== Town Council ===
Candidates	Votes	%
Reginald Grandy	119	15.3%
Debbie Banfield	117	15.1%
Alvin Banfield	94	12.1%
Kevin Banfield SR	84	10.8%
Herb Banfield	68	8.7%
Thomas Barnes JR	65	8.4%
Daphne Banfield	58	7.5%
Dwane Dominaux	47	6%
Allan Reid	44	5.6%
Dana Banfield	42	5.4%
Darrell Walters	35	4.5%

== Bay Roberts ==
=== Mayor ===
Candidate	Votes	%
Geoff Seymour (X)	Acclaimed	

=== Town Council ===
Candidates	Votes	%
Neil Kearley	1,120	17.18
Perry Bowering (X)	943	14.46
Dean Franey (X)	893	13.70
Ross Petten (X)	803	12.32
Frank Deering (X)	750	11.50
Silas Badcock (X)	741	11.37
Ryan Butler	635	9.74
Shelley Grogan	635	9.74

== Baytona ==
=== Town Council ===
Candidates	Votes	%
Theola Budden	Acclaimed	
Wade Mugford (X)	Acclaimed	
Craig Canning	Acclaimed	
Jeanette Burt (X)	Acclaimed	
Audrey Blake (X)	Acclaimed	
Eileen Lewis (X)	Acclaimed	

== Beachside ==
=== Town Council ===
Candidates	Votes	%
Nancy Bowers (X)	56	13%
Shane Coombs	53	12.3%
Sterling Tulk	53	12.3%
Lorne Pittman	52	12%
Dylan Penney	41	9.5%
Tracey Andrews (X)	40	9.3%
Randy Young	39	9%
Jim Smith	37	8.6%
Rhonda Oxford-Winsor	35	8.1%
Peggy Bennett	19	0.44%
Alicia Thomas-Penney	5	0.11%

== Bellburns ==
=== Town Council ===
Candidates	Votes	%
Andrew Stephens (X)	Acclaimed	
Denise House (X)	Acclaimed	

== Belleoram ==
=== Town Council ===
Candidates	Votes	%
Harrison Barnes	Acclaimed	
Randall Barnes	Acclaimed	
Daniel Leights (X)	Acclaimed	
Kyle Leights	Acclaimed	
Henry Leights (X)	Acclaimed	
Jonah Poole (X)	Acclaimed	
Newman Rose (X)	Acclaimed	

== Birchy Bay ==
=== Town Council ===
Candidates	Votes	%
David Carter (X)	Acclaimed	
Tonya Freake (X)	Acclaimed	
Viola Freake	Acclaimed	
Kevin Guy (X)	Acclaimed	
Hazel Mews-Rideout (X)	Acclaimed	
Kelly Quinlan (X)	Acclaimed	
Sterling Quinlan	Acclaimed	

== Bird Cove ==
=== Town Council ===
Candidates	Votes	%
Deanna Myers	Acclaimed	
Jessica Dredge (X)	Acclaimed	
Thelma Coombs (X)	Acclaimed	
Nadine Gould (X)	Acclaimed	

== Bishop's Cove ==
=== Town Council ===
Candidate	Votes	%
Gary N. Smith (X)		
Lori-Ann King		
Ken Smith		
Gregory Barnes		
Muriel Drover		
Hubert Smith		
Joan Dove		

Results are not yet posted!

== Bishop's Falls ==
=== Mayor ===
Candidate	Votes	%
Krista Toms	Acclaimed	

=== Town Council ===
Candidates	Votes	%
Robert Canning (X)	Acclaimed	
Cindy Hooper (X)	Acclaimed	
Paul Kennedy (X)	Acclaimed	
Kirk McDonald (X)	Acclaimed	
Melinda Sharpe	Acclaimed	
William Tremblett	Acclaimed	

== Bonavista ==
=== Mayor ===
Candidate	Votes	%
John Norman	Acclaimed	

=== Town council ===
Candidates	Votes	%
Reg Butler	846	12.1%
Paul Ryan	799	11.4%
Stephen Chard	749	10.7%
Nicole Abbott (X)	709	10.1%
Barry Randell (X)	696	9.9%
Eliza Mouland-Swyers	666	9.5%
Lindsay Phillips (X)	605	8.6%
David Hiscock (X)	601	8.6%
Sheri Gillam	539	7.7%
Joshua Clarke	438	6.2%
Marlene Butler	323	4.6%

== Botwood ==
=== Town Council ===
Candidates	Votes	%
Myra Budgell	759	11.7%
Eric Boone	610	9.4%
Jim Hancock	587	9%
Warren Broderick (X)	574	8.8%
Michelle Jacobs	562	8.7%
Jason Jeans	529	8.1%
Harold Edison	485	7.5%
Ken Newhook	357	5.5%
Chris Ivany (X)	309	4.7%
Peter Mclean	303	4.6%
Alphonsus Hanlon	300	4.6%
Scott Sceviour (X)	290	4.4%
James Sceviour (X)	281	4.3%
Michael Tremblett	212	3.2%
Angela Gee	198	3%
David Stuckless	102	1.5%

== Branch ==
=== Town Council ===
Candidates	Votes	%
Kelly Power (X)	112	15.6%
Alice Mooney (X)	107	14.9%
Angie Power (X)	105	14.6%
Cindy Power	103	14.3%
Jennifer English (X)	99	13.8%
Georgina McGrath	82	11.4%
Agnes Nash	56	7.8%
Lorna English	52	7.2%

== Brent's Cove ==
=== Town Council ===
Canadiates	Votes	%
Edith Damalon	Acclaimed	
Colleen Haas	Acclaimed	
Wavey Haas	Acclaimed	
Raymond Matthews	Acclaimed	

== Brighton ==
=== Town Council ===
Candidates	Votes	%
Stewart Fillier	Acclaimed	
Edmond Fudge	Acclaimed	
Frank Fudge	Acclaimed	
Glenn Fudge	Acclaimed	
Lindy Fudge	Acclaimed	
Fern Henstridge	Acclaimed	
Bradley Verge	Acclaimed	

== Brigus ==
=== Town Council ===
Candidates	Votes	%
Michael McDonald	213	15.5%
Shears Mercer JR (X)	208	15.1%
Goldie Broughton	200	14.6%
Robert Butler	199	14.5%
Cecilia Stadler	170	12.4%
Michelle Gushue	167	12.1%
Steven Spracklin	142	10.3%
Peter Power	70	5.1%

== Bryant's Cove ==
=== Town Council ===
Candidates	Votes	%
Dorothy Drover (X)	Acclaimed	
Adam Noseworthy (X)	Acclaimed	
Cindy Noseworthy (X)	Acclaimed	
Jim Yetman (X)	Acclaimed	
Linda Yetman (X)	Acclaimed	
Erica Smith (X)	Acclaimed	
Kim Sheppard (X)	Acclaimed	

== Buchans ==
=== Town Council ===
Candidates	Votes	%
David Boland	259	11.1%
Stephanie Noftle (X)	227	9.7%
Brian Fowlow (X)	202	8.7%
Dale Piercey (X)	197	8.4%
Robert (Leo) Lane	193	8.3%
Gerald Bursey	175	7.5%
Mark Hiscock (X)	151	6.5%
Melanie Dixon (X)	149	6.4%
Carolyn Rowsell	130	5.6%
Keith Higdon	112	4.7%
Stephen Hiscock	99	4.2%
Lance Dawe	93	4%
Micheal O'Brien (X)	87	3.7%
Melissa Hawco	77	3.3%
Tammy St.John	72	3.1%
Gary Noftle	56	2.4%
David St.John	39	1.6%

== Burgeo ==
Candidates	Votes	%
Cyril Warren (X)	Acclaimed	
Trevor Green (X)	Acclaimed	
Stanley Strickland (X)	Acclaimed	
Darrell Mercer (X)	Acclaimed	
Richard Blagdon (X)	Acclaimed	
Brock Vatcher	Acclaimed	
William Bowles (X)	Acclaimed	

== Burin ==
=== Mayor ===
Candidate	Votes	%
Kevin Lundrigan (X)	Acclaimed	

=== Town Council ===
Candidates	Votes	%
Shane Foote (X)	Acclaimed	
Karen Inkpen	Acclaimed	
Rhonda Isaacs (X)	Acclaimed	
Alison Kavanaugh	Acclaimed	
Howard Lundrigan (X)	Acclaimed	
Justin Noseworthy	Acclaimed	

== Burlington ==
=== Mayor ===
Candidates	Votes	%
Rudy Norman (X)	94	55.6%
Chris Mitchell	55	32.5%
Dean Kelly	20	11.8%

=== Town Council ===
Candidates	Votes	%
Alonzo Saunders (X)	135	21.1%
Kevin Winsor (X)	117	18.3%
Bobby Welshman (X)	103	16.11%
Marcus Mitchell	89	13.9%
Tony Kelly	82	12.8%
Darren Bartlett	70	10.9%
Cody Thomas	43	6.7%

== Burnt Islands ==
=== Town Council ===
Candidates	Votes	%
Hickman Keeping	126	14.5%
Melton Keeping	118	13.6%
Jason Keeping	106	12.2%
Reuben Taylor	105	12.1%
Jabez Keeping	103	11.8%
Paul Strickland	88	10.1%
Roger Keeping Sr.	85	9.8%
Keith Edmunds	71	8.1%
Wallace Kinslow	65	7.4%

== Campbellton ==
=== Town Council ===
Candidates	Votes	%
Colleen Budgell	163	12.9%
Melissa (Shelly) Ivany	152	12%
Clara (Maisie) Clarke	150	11.9%
Lisa (Paulette) Lush	146	11.5%
Timothy Rowsell	141	11.1%
Garry Young	126	10%
Desiree Organ	120	9.5%
Roxane Rowsell	116	9.2%
Diane Deering	75	5.9%
Evelyn Wheeler	70	5.5%

== Cape Broyle ==
=== Town Council ===
Candidates	Votes	%
Beverley O'brien	116	18.3%
Donny Graham	100	15.8%
Lynden Doyle	78	12.3%
Amanda Duggan	76	12%
Andrea O'Brien	73	11.5%
Wayne Kenny	71	11.2%
Paula Hawkins	59	9.3%
Elizabeth Stefan	58	9.1%

== Cape St. George ==
=== Town Council ===
Candidates	Votes	%
Martin Chaisson	Acclaimed	
Stella Cornect	Acclaimed	
Duran Felix	Acclaimed	
Catherine Fenwick	Acclaimed	
Gerry Labelle	Acclaimed	
Mercedez Quinlan	Acclaimed	
Nadine Tallack	Acclaimed	

== Carbonear ==
=== Mayor ===
Candidate	Votes	%
Sam Slade	Acclaimed	

=== Town Council ===
Candidates	Votes	%
Fred Earle	1,034	15.30
Malcolm Seymour (X)	990	14.65
Stephen Penney	816	12.07
Wendy Penney	783	11.58
Amanda Dowden	773	11.44
Peter Snow (X)	744	11.01
Julia Parsons	681	10.08
Rebecca Parsons	599	8.86
Kenneth E. Chubbs	339	5.01

== Carmanville ==
=== Town Council ===
Candidates	Votes	%
Samantha Budden	170	13.7%
Marilyn Tulk	157	12.7%
Hayward Morgan (X)	151	12.2%
Brian Thompson	146	11.8%
Brittany Whalen	146	11.8%
Elaine Coles	132	10.6%
Mitchell Nippard (X)	125	10.1%
Ryan Ellsworth	111	8.9%
Kimberley Blackwood (X)	55	4.4%
Keith Howell (X)	42	3.4%

== Cartwright ==
=== Town Council ===
Candidates	Votes	%
Sonya Dyson	136	17.3%
Priscilla Clark	134	17%
Madison Dyson	112	14.2%
Sandra Mugford	94	11.9%
Shawn Holwell	89	11.3%
Jeannie Ward	82	10.4%
Kathy Rogers	65	8.2%
Samantha Rumbolt	31	3.9%
Wendy Greenleaves	23	2.9%
Robyn Holwell	20	2.5%

== Centreville-Wareham-Trinity ==
=== Mayor ===
The mayor was elected by Draw as it was a tie.

Candidates	Votes	%
Ivan Pickett (X)	251	50%
Triffie Parsons	251	50%

=== Town Council ===
Canddiates	Votes	%
Kirk White (X)	374	21.6%
Corey Pickett	306	17.7%
Tony Cutler	301	17.4%
Ian Brackstone	285	16.5%
Ralph Ackerman (X)	235	13.6%
Joseph Pollett (X)	225	13%
Ashley Feltham	208	12%
Christopher Firmage	185	10.7%
Conrad Collins	179	10.3%
Paul Reddy	114	6.6%

== Chance Cove ==
=== Town Council ===
Candidates	Votes	%
Larry Clarke	138	19.4%
Perry Brace	130	18.3%
Phyllis Smith	116	16.3%
Margaret Clarke	95	13.3%
Rodney Smith	90	12.6%
Ken Askeland	65	9.1%
Dennis Legge	51	7.1%
Mike Best	24	3.3%

== Change Islands ==
=== Town Council ===
Candidates	Votes	%
Paula Flood (X)	Acclaimed	
Dennis Flood (X)	Acclaimed	
Derrick Parsons (X)	Acclaimed	

== Channel-Port aux Basques ==
=== Mayor ===
Candidates	Votes	%
Mark Andrews	723	60.6%
John Spencer	469	39.3%

=== Town Council ===
Candidates	Votes	%
Richard Spencer	931	18.3%
Jerome Battiste	792	15.6%
Graham McDonald	707	13.9%
Adam Anderson	683	13.4%
Perry Lomond	670	13.2%
Shannon Battiste	644	12.7%
Ryan Knight	439	8.6%
Ross Cooper	194	3.8%

== Chapel Arm ==
=== Town council ===
Canadiates	Votes	%
Lloyd Reid (X)	Acclaimed	
Shane Power (X)	Acclaimed	
Martin Power	Acclaimed	
Shawn Reid	Acclaimed	
Trudy Reid (X)	Acclaimed	

== Charlottetown ==
=== Town Council ===
Candidates	Votes	%
Ricky Oram	Acclaimed	
Charmaine Powell	Acclaimed	
Olive Penney	Acclaimed	
Cherie lee Campbell-Oram	Acclaimed	
Llewelyn Burt Jr.	Acclaimed	

== Clarenville ==
=== Mayor ===
Candidates	Votes	%
John Pickett (X)	1,273	62.99
Paul Tilley	748	37.01

=== Town Council ===
Candidates	Votes	%
Dylan Stringer	1,436	15.33
Keith Fillier (X)	1,425	15.21
Donna Maloney-Brown (X)	1,419	15.15
Deidra Strowbridge (X)	1,328	14.18
Heber Smith (X)	1,125	12.01
Rod Nicholl	1,055	11.26
Bill Bailey (X)	938	10.01
Shawn Taylor	640	6.83

== Clarke's Beach ==
=== Mayor ===
Candidate	Votes	%
Danielle Delaney Bussey	Acclaimed	

=== Town council ===
Candidates	Votes	%
June Batten (X)	Acclaimed	
Terri lee Bishop	Acclaimed	
Stephen Dawe	Acclaimed	
Jim Giles	Acclaimed	
Kelly Kavanagh (X)	Acclaimed	
Alice Russell (X)	Acclaimed	

== Coachman's Cove ==
=== Town Council ===
Candidates	Votes	%
Robert Baker (X)	Acclaimed	
Jackie Walsh (X)	Acclaimed	

== Colinet ==
=== Town Council ===
Candidates	Votes	%
V. Joan Nolan (X)	Acclaimed	
Gerard Linehan	Acclaimed	
Paula Linehan	Acclaimed	

== Colliers ==
=== Town Council ===
Candidates	Votes	%
Connie Power	151	21.9%
Andy Parsley	148	21.5%
Rory Ryan	134	19.4%
Elizabeth Whalen	130	18.8%
Donny McDonald	125	18.1%
Gerry Ryan	66	9.5%

== Come By Chance ==
=== Town Council ===
Candidates	Votes	%
Michael Boutcher	Acclaimed	
Trevor Hodder (X)	Acclaimed	
David Boutcher (X)	Acclaimed	
Carol Molloy (X)	Acclaimed	
Llewellyn Osmond	Acclaimed	

== Comfort Cove-Newstead ==
=== Town Council ===
Candidates	Votes	%
Christopher Head	170	17.1%
Leroy Hicks	151	15.2%
Ryan Watkins	142	14.3%
Richard Migneault	96	9.6%
Edward Carroll	95	9.5%
Shelly White	92	9.2%
Michelle Hurley	65	6.5%
Bond Cooper	58	5.8%
Dion Wells	53	5.3%
Heather Hurley	34	3.4%
Judson Ginn	19	1.9%
Jonathon Norris	16	1.6%

== Conception Bay South ==
=== Mayor ===
Candidates	Votes	%
Darrin Bent (X)	Acclaimed	

=== Town Council ===
Candidates	Votes	%
Ward 1
Shelley Moores (X)	754	58.13
Robert Sharpe	543	41.87
Ward 2
Andrea Gosse (X)	633	58.13
Junior Bursey	456	41.87
Ward 3
Gerard Tilley (X)	531	61.67
Roland Anthony	330	38.33
Ward 4
Melissa Hardy (X)	Acclaimed	
At Large (4 councillors)
Christine Butler (X)	2,499	22.53
Rex Hillier (X)	2,390	21.55
Joshua Barrett (X)	2,288	20.63
Warrick Cluney	2,125	19.16
Jason Riggs	1,790	16.14

== Conception Harbour ==
=== Town Council ===
Candidates	Votes	%
Patrick T. Gushue	156	17.5%
John W. Mahoney	144	16.2%
Judy Rotchford	139	15.6%
Patrick O'toole	100	11.2%
Lawrence Penney	100	11.2%
Earon Pike	95	10.6%
Maria Pike	84	9.4%
Yvonne O'toole	70	7.8%

== Conche ==
=== Town Council ===
Candidates	Votes	%
Brendon Fitzpatrick	Acclaimed	
Daphne Hunt	Acclaimed	
Bridget Carroll	Acclaimed	
Paul Hunt	Acclaimed	

== Cook's Harbour ==
=== Mayor ===
Candidate	Votes	%
Barry Decker (X)	Acclaimed	

=== Town Council ===
Candidates	Votes	%
Leonard Warren	Acclaimed	
Jennifer Smith	Acclaimed	

== Cormack ==
=== Mayor ===
Candidates	Votes	%
Anthony Alexander (X)	167	54.9
Ryan Toope	137	45.1

=== Town Council ===
Candidates	Votes	%
Melvin Rideout JR (X)	Acclaimed	
Chuck Elms (X)	Acclaimed	
Darryl Pynn (X)	Acclaimed	
Andrew Brake (X)	Acclaimed	

== Corner Brook ==
=== Mayor ===
Incumbent mayor Jim Parsons initially sought re-election, but later chose to run as the Liberal candidate for Corner Brook in the provincial election.

Candidates	Votes	%
Linda Chaisson	3,498	76.71
Pamela Gill	1,062	23.29

=== City Council ===
The city of Corner Brook has six members in its city council. The only incumbent council member who ran again, Pam Keeping, was re-elected along with five new councillors.

Candidates	Votes	%
Pam Keeping (X)	2,613	11.05
Donna Luther	2,481	10.49
Sherry Dean	1,955	8.30
Steve Perchard	1,889	7.99
Donna Wheeler	1,720	7.28
Eddie Kennedy	1,706	7.22
Sarah Parsons	1,668	7.06
Chad Parsons	1,648	6.97
Michelle Payne	1,637	6.92
Keith Hobbs	1,341	5.67
Geoff Sparkes	1,202	5.08
Tony Buckle	1,200	5.08
Tom Stewart	1,097	4.64
Tarragh Shanahan	868	3.67
Randy Warren	616	2.61

== Cottlesville ==
=== Town Council ===
Candidates	Votes	%
Jeffery Small	113	14.4%
Hayley Barnes	93	11.9%
Jennifer Anstey	88	11.2%
Judy Broderick	85	10.8%
Robin Philpott	77	9.8%
Melanie Philpott	73	9.3%
Carl Philpott	70	8.9%
Cadiz Rideout	62	7.9%
Kaitlyn Hawkins	61	7.8%
Raymond Rogers	40	5.1%
Mary Anstey	18	2.3%

== Cow Head ==
=== Town Council ===
Candidates	Votes	%
Deanna Hutchings (X)	Acclaimed	
Troy Patey (X)	Acclaimed	
Oscar Payne (X)	Acclaimed	
Charlotte Cryderman (X)	Acclaimed	
Garland Hutchings	Acclaimed	
Bruce Payne (X)	Acclaimed	
Tiffany Payne	Acclaimed	

== Cox's Cove ==
=== Town council ===
Candidates	Votes	%
Eric Bryson	178	19.6%
Victor Sheppard	161	17.7%
B.J Wells	161	17.7%
Terry Wells	154	16.9%
Perry Sheppard (X)	135	14.8%
Iris Goosney	118	13%

== Crow Head ==
=== Town Council ===
Candidates	Votes	%
Philip Dove	62	13.9%
Paul Elliott	58	13%
David Dove	56	12.6%
Lloyd Andrews	55	12.4%
Gloria Bath	55	12.4%
Deborah Sharpe	54	12.1%
Suzanne Brake	38	8.5%
Karen Dove	36	8.1%
Ted Rosenthallewis	29	6.5%

== Cupids ==
=== Town Council ===
Candidates	Votes	%
Valerie Brett- Westcott (X)	Acclaimed	
Christine Burry (X)	Acclaimed	
Rebecca Burton (X)	Acclaimed	
Alex Dawe (X)	Acclaimed	
Rodney Delaney (X)	Acclaimed	
Rodney Linthorne (X)	Acclaimed	
Tiffany Youden (X)	Acclaimed	

== Daniel's Harbour ==
=== Mayor ===
Candidate	Votes	%
Ross Humber (X)	Acclaimed	

=== Town Council ===
Candidates	Votes	%
Troy Pearce	85	15.4%
Harvey House Jr.	80	14.5%
Keisha Caines	79	14.3%
Shawn Perry (X)	73	13.2%
Jeffrey Biggin	65	11.8%
Roger House (X)	58	10.5%
Cheryl Campanion (X)	39	7.1%
Dona House	37	6.7%
Norman House	33	6%

== Deer Lake ==
=== Mayor ===
Candidates	Votes	%
Dean Ball	Acclaimed	

=== Town Council ===
Candidates	Votes	%
Lindell Smith	891	15.08
David Hynes (X)	878	14.86
Kerry Jones (X)	865	14.64
Darren Fitzgerald (X)	864	14.63
Keith Park	847	14.34
Andrew Strangemore	814	13.78
David Parsons	748	12.66

== Dover ==
=== Mayor ===
Candidate	Votes	%
Tony R. Keats (X)	Acclaimed	

=== Town Council ===
Candidates	Votes	%
Eugene Button	127	12.3%
Michael Collins	101	9.7%
Gino Collins	98	9.4%
Michelle Collins	88	8.5%
Mitchell Mongrain	88	8.5%
Wesley Feltham	78	7.5%
Doreen Glover	73	7%
Alvinwood Johnson (X)	67	6.4%
Jerry Hunt (X)	66	6.3%
Paula (Hounsell) Glover	59	5.7%
Robert Wiseman (X)	54	5.2%
Pamela Mongrain (X)	51	4.9%
Paul Hounsell (X)	48	4.6%
Claude Willis	34	3.2%

== Eastport ==
=== Town Council ===
Candidates	Votes	%
Jackie Crisby	Acclaimed	
Amanda Handcock	Acclaimed	
Karen Powell	Acclaimed	

== Elliston ==
=== Town Council ===
Candidates	Votes	%
Geraldine Baker (X)	100	16.4%
Derek Martin (X)	98	16.1%
Stephen Dyke	87	14.3%
Evan Tilley	83	13.6%
Harriet Tilley (X)	81	13.3%
Jabez Chaulk (X)	53	8.7%
Alfred Chaulk (X)	42	6.9%
Todd Mouland	39	6.4%
Kenneth Reid	25	4.1%

== Embree ==
=== Town Council ===
Candidates	Votes	%
Don Bennett (X)	Acclaimed	
Tammy Fifield	Acclaimed	
Robert Foss (X)	Acclaimed	
Harold Fudge	Acclaimed	
Harold Nippard (X)	Acclaimed	
Herman Nippard (X)	Acclaimed	

== Englee ==
=== Town Council ===
Candidates	Votes	%
Stephanie Fillier	Acclaimed	
Benson Randell	Acclaimed	
Ronald Twyne	Acclaimed	
Jacqueline Randell	Acclaimed	
Todd Curtis	Acclaimed	
Wilfred Newman	Acclaimed	

== English Harbour East ==
No election yet!

== Fermeuse ==
=== Town Council ===
Candidates	Votes	%
Cheryl Ryan (X)	Acclaimed	
Neil Fennelly	Acclaimed	
Shannon Ryan (X)	Acclaimed	
Perry Oates (X)	Acclaimed	
Jerome Kenny (X)	Acclaimed	

== Ferryland ==
=== Town Council ===
Candidates	Votes	%
Aidan Costello (X)	151	16.7%
Arnold J. Furlong (X)	144	16%
Adrian Kavanagh	140	15.5%
Steven Barnable	132	14.6%
Kevin Walsh	107	11.9%
Cyril Barbour	101	11.2%
Madeline McCaul	68	7.5%
Peter Morry	56	6.2%

== Flatrock ==
=== Mayor ===
Candidate	Votes	%
Jeff Conners	Acclaimed	

=== Town Council ===
Candidates	Votes	%
Susan Arns	Acclaimed	
Madonna Connors (X)	Acclaimed	
Marion McCarthy (X)	Acclaimed	
Alicia Scott (X)	Acclaimed	
Brian Waterman (X)	Acclaimed	

== Fleur de Lys ==
=== Town Council ===
Candidates	Votes	%
Mary Compton (X)	Acclaimed	
Betty Ann Moar	Acclaimed	
Jack Dzerounian	Acclaimed	
Jacqueline Dzerounian	Acclaimed	
Natasha Rideout	Acclaimed	

== Flower's Cove ==
=== Town Council ===
Candidates	Votes	%
Maggie Chambers (X)	Acclaimed	
Kerry Way (X)	Acclaimed	
Lynn Way (X)	Acclaimed	
Sandra Way (X)	Acclaimed	

== Fogo Island ==
=== Town Council ===
Candidates	Votes	%
Andrew Shea (X)	Acclaimed	
Damian Roebotham (X)	Acclaimed	
David Mckenna (X)	Acclaimed	
Holly Payne	Acclaimed	
Lary Roebotham (X)	Acclaimed	

== Forteau ==
=== Town Council ===
Candidates	Votes	%
Aaron Hiscock	99	14.2%
Dean Flynn	94	13.5%
Geoffrey Hancock	82	11.8%
Marty Hancock	77	11%
Tiffany Piercey	64	9.2%
Robert Hancock	60	8.6%
Terry Hancock	57	8.2%
Michael Roberts	52	7.4%
James Roberts	50	7.2%
Treavor Hancock	31	4.4%
Tonya Hancock	28	4%

== Fortune ==
=== Town Council ===
Candidates	Votes	%
Kenneth Keeping (X)	320	13.2%
Deneka Follett	278	11.5%
Sherry Brady	271	11.2%
Rodney Rose (X)	265	10.9%
Rita Piercey (X)	253	10.4%
Dwayne Caines	208	8.6%
Frazer Smith	204	8.4%
Angus Stacey	196	8.1%
George Hillier	186	7.7%
Perry Pierce	115	4.7%
Sherry Rose	115	4.7%

== Fox Cove-Mortier ==
=== Town Council ===
Candidates	Votes	%
Danny Power	70	17.6%
Irene Doody	66	16.6%
Wanda Antle	62	15.6%
Mary Brown	61	15.4%
Harvey Courage	57	14.3%
Ernest Kavanagh	46	11.6%
Carl Drake	34	8.5%

== Fox Harbour ==
=== Town Council ===
Candidates	Votes	%
Anne Griffiths	Acclaimed	
Carmel Perham	Acclaimed	
Shelly Quilty	Acclaimed	

== Frenchman's Cove ==
=== Town Council ===
Candidates	Votes	%
Greg May	Acclaimed	
Mildred J. Rideout	Acclaimed	
Robynn Toal	Acclaimed	

== Gallants ==
=== Town Council ===
Candidates	Votes	%
Ivan Luscombe	Acclaimed	
Colin Day	Acclaimed	
Todd Brake (X)	Acclaimed	
Matty Bobbitt	Acclaimed	
Amanda Vincent	Acclaimed	

== Gambo ==
=== Town Council ===
Candidates	Votes	%
Morgan Cooze	Acclaimed	
Charlene Kean	Acclaimed	
Peter Lush	Acclaimed	
Lori Moss (X)	Acclaimed	
Minnie Osmond	Acclaimed	

== Gander ==
=== Mayor ===
Candidate	Votes	%
Percy Farwell (X)	Acclaimed	

=== Town Council ===
Candidates	Votes	%
Tara Pollett (X)	1,949	17.12
Samantha Abbott	1,581	13.89
Sheldon Hancock (X)	1,488	13.07
Patrick Woodford (X)	1,454	12.78
Krystle West	1,319	11.59
Jim Lidstone	996	8.75
Oswald Fudge	894	7.86
Timeyin David Owojaiye	836	7.35
Barry Mullet	519	4.56
Jason Mitchell	345	3.03

== Garnish ==
=== Town Council ===
Candidates	Votes	%
Cyril Drowns	Acclaimed	
Bruce Grandy (X)	Acclaimed	
Jaime Hiscock	Acclaimed	
Bonnie Intveld (X)	Acclaimed	
Yvonne Keeping (X)	Acclaimed	
David Yetman	Acclaimed	

== Gaskiers-Point La Haye ==
=== Town Council ===
Candidates	Votes	%
Ronald Dillon	82	20.1%
Curtis Critch	77	18.9%
Kean Bishop	73	17.9%
Josephine Kielly	69	16.9%
Basil St. Croix	58	14.2%
Michael Cahill	47	11.5%

== Gaultois ==
=== Town Council ===
Candidates	Votes	%
Gordon Hunt (X)	Acclaimed	
Derick Drover	Acclaimed	
Todd Hunt	Acclaimed	

== George's Brook-Milton ==
=== Town Council ===
Candidates	Votes	%
Bruce Phillips (X)	131	19.5%
David Adams (X)	129	19.2%
Morgan Ellis (X)	126	18.7%
Gary Pelley	124	18.4%
Audrey Holloway (X)	120	17.8%
Walter Clarke	41	6.1%

== Gilliams ==
=== Town Council ===
Candidates	Votes	%
Joy Burt	Acclaimed	
Charlotte Gauthier	Acclaimed	
Cris Puckering	Acclaimed	
George Callahan	Acclaimed	
Linda Blanchard	Acclaimed	

== Glenburnie-Birchy Head-Shoal Brook ==
=== Town Council ===
Candidates	Votes	%
Mitch Goosney	83	24.6%
Joyce Young	72	21.3%
Vanessa Tucker	68	20.1%
Bella Young	60	17.8%
Darryl Sheppard	54	16%
Shawn Tatchell	43	12.7%
Freeman Burden	41	12.1%

== Glenwood ==
=== Town Council ===
Candidates	Votes	%
Allison Laite	164	14.1%
Andrew R. Burt (X)	134	11.6%
Perry Gillingham (X)	132	11.4%
James W. Downey	128	11%
Bonnie Warren (X)	120	10.3%
Ronnie Morey	114	9.8%
William Laite	105	9%
Glenn Gillingham (X)	98	8.4%
Dean Morey	97	8.3%
Alonzo Bryan	63	5.4%

== Glovertown ==
=== Mayor ===
Candidates	Votes	%
Douglas Churchill (X)	581	62.6%
Paul Whelan	346	37.3%

=== Town Council ===
Candidates	Votes	%
Lindahi Butt	730	16.6%
Eric Blackwood JR (X)	685	15.6%
Craig Arnold (X)	664	15.1%
Sandy Collins	663	15.1%
Ronald Mackey (X)	641	14.6%
Kim Gordon	360	8.2%
Don Moss	345	7.8%
Jesse Paul	297	6.7%

== Goose Cove East ==
=== Town Council ===
Candidates	Votes	%
Rita Reardon	Acclaimed	
Roy Ward	Acclaimed	
Valarie Ward	Acclaimed	
Troy McCarthy	Acclaimed	
Stephen Alyward	Acclaimed	

== Grand Bank ==
=== Mayor ===
Candidate	Votes	%
John (Jack) Burfitt	Acclaimed	

=== Town Council ===
Candidates	Votes	%
Derrick Dunne (X)	705	14.8%
Amanda Meade	680	14.3%
Roger Brooks (X)	626	13.2%
Stan Burt (X)	596	12.5%
Colin Clements (X)	537	11.3%
Elaine Strowbridge	443	9.3%
Bradley Keeping	412	8.6%
Ashley Grandy	390	8.2%
Ernest (Tub) Follett	347	7.3%

== Grand Falls-Windsor ==
=== Mayor ===
Candidate	Votes	%
Mike Browne	Acclaimed	

=== Town Council ===
Candidates	Votes	%
Rod (Blackie) Bennett	2,301	9.15
Bob (Flipper) Hiscock (X)	2,146	8.54
Venus Hollett	2,083	8.28
Amy Coady (X)	2,011	8.00
David (Davey) Janes	1,814	7.22
Shawn Feener	1,781	7.08
Wayde Thompson	1,772	7.05
Dave Noel (X)	1,764	7.02
Jeff Hollett	1,747	6.95
Holly Dwyer (X)	1,707	6.79
Gerry Gardner	1,420	5.65
Andrew Little (X)	1,132	4.50
David Hillier	942	3.75
David Oxford	930	3.70
Gail Trites	926	3.68
Larry Hennessey	666	2.65

== Grand le Pierre ==
=== Town Council ===
Candidates	Votes	%
Sherman Bolt	68	13.9%
Calvin Dominaux	58	11.8%
Timothy Kearley	48	9.8%
Dennis Kearley	47	9.6%
Carl Hickey	44	8.9%
Glen Hickey	43	8.7%
Corrina James	35	7.1%
Rita Mary Bolt	34	6.9%
Keith Hickey	32	6.5%
Juanita Hickey	24	4.9%
Sarah Kearley	21	4.2%
Cindy Bolt	18	3.6%
Shirley Stewart	17	3.4%

== Greenspond ==
=== Town Council ===
Candidates	Votes	%
Darryl Burry	107	14.4%
Craig Jerrett	106	14.2%
Julian Matthews	106	14.2%
Boyd Burton Sr.	97	13%
Roxane Hounsell	97	13%
Karl Wheeler	94	12.6%
Dana Burry	80	10.7%
Mary Howse	55	7.4%

== Hampden ==
=== Mayor ===
Candidate	Votes	%
Calvin Wilton (X)	Acclaimed	

=== Town Council ===
Candidates	Votes	%
Karen Hoddinott (X)	150	16.3%
Barry Pilgrim (X)	144	15.6%
Kyle Osmond (X)	134	14.5%
Everett Davis (X)	104	11.3%
William (Bill) Gale	95	10.3%
Robert Osmond	87	9.4%
Jackie Hewitt	74	8%
Karen Osmond	68	7.3%
Kelly Stoodart	63	6.8%

== Hant's Harbour ==
=== Town Council ===
Candidates	Votes	%
Korn Power	128	13.6%
Terry Ash (X)	110	11.7%
Sherry Peddle	110	11.7%
Donald Green (X)	108	11.4%
Jana Noonan (X)	108	11.4%
Eric Tuck	101	10.7%
Andy Rogers	99	10.5%
Judy King (X)	87	9.2%
Aaron Blake	57	6%
Lee Ann Bown	32	3.4%

== Happy Adventure ==
=== Town Council ===
Candidates	Votes	%
Bessie O'grady (X)	Acclaimed	
Gary Powell (X)	Acclaimed	
Wayne Powell (X)	Acclaimed	
Jim Powell (X)	Acclaimed	
Norman Turner (X)	Acclaimed	
Carl Turner (X)	Acclaimed	

== Happy Valley-Goose Bay ==
=== Mayor ===
Candidate	Votes	%
W. Bert Pomeroy	974	54.69
Edward Blake-Rudkowski	807	45.31

=== Town Council ===
Candidates	Votes	%
Jackie Compton Hobbs (X)	1,132	13.19
Lori Dyson	1,008	11.74
Jill Williams	861	10.03
Todd Winters (X)	846	9.85
Denise Rumbolt (X)	820	9.55
Dion O'Dell	814	9.48
Bernard Hickey	790	9.20
Tony Chubbs	688	8.01
Curtis Saunders	569	6.63
Maxwell Blake	567	6.60
Hubert Loder	490	5.71

== Harbour Breton ==
=== Town Council ===
Candidates	Votes	%
Selwyn Langdon	374	13.2%
Fabian Manning (X)	338	11.9%
Lloyd Blake (X)	336	11.9%
Roy G. Drake (X)	335	11.8%
Mark Wells	291	10.3%
Eric T. Bungay	272	9.6%
Colby Whittle (X)	268	9.5%
Roger Perry	217	7.6%
Lloyd Jensen	205	7.2%
Donald Stewart (X)	183	6.4%

== Harbour Grace ==
=== Mayor ===
Candidates	Votes	%
Terry Barnes	720	52.3%
Donald Coombs (X)	656	47.6%

=== Town Council ===
Candidates	Votes	%
Dr. Gary Baker	877	13.6%
Christina Hearn	865	13.4%
Lee Rogers (X)	836	12.9%
Gordon Stone (X)	644	9.9%
Keith Skinner (X)	614	9.5%
Sharon Reynolds	536	8.3%
Randy Wrice	451	6.9%
Linda M. Smith	392	6%
Ray Verge	316	4.9%
Shawn Vaters	295	4.5%
Peter Yetman (X)	293	4.5%
Kevin Williams	191	2.9%
Roy Abbott	133	2%

== Harbour Main-Chapel's Cove-Lakeview ==
=== Mayor ===
Candidate	Votes	%
Mike Doyle (X)	Acclaimed	

=== Town Council ===
Candidates	Votes	%
Glen Hickey (X)	Acclaimed	
Jim Corbett (X)	Acclaimed	
Justin Wade	Acclaimed	
Michelle Seward	Acclaimed	
Shelley Woodford	Acclaimed	
Ted Maloney	Acclaimed	

== Hare bay ==
=== Town Council ===
Candidates	Votes	%
Dean Wells	315	14.3%
Susan (Sue) Collins	287	13%
David Eddy	236	10.7%
Gregory (Greg) Collins	217	9.8%
Jane Harvey	201	9.1%
Glenn Parsons	199	9%
Krista Oram	150	6.8%
Sonya Collins	119	5.4%
Stephen AM (Steve) Glover	117	5.3%
Colin Hunt	112	5.1%
Beatrice Glover	107	4.8%
Melvin Vivian (X)	55	2.5%
Bernard (Berni) Seaward	30	1.3%
Rodney Glover (X)	27	1.2%
Lester Glover (X)	22	1.0%

== Hawke's Bay ==
=== Mayor ===
Candidates	Votes	%
Lloyd Bennett (X)	113	55.1%
Pearl Pike	74	3.6%
Michelle Clowe	16	0.7%

=== Town Council ===
Candidates	Votes	%
Norman House	160	12.9%
Ronald Ayre	130	11.2%
Kristy-lee Gashlard	118	10.2%
Cornelius Hoddinott	117	10.1%
Thomas Maynard	110	9.5%
Angela Roberts (X)	83	7.1%
Thomas Patey (X)	78	6.7%
Todd House	75	6.4%
Andrew Sinnicks (X)	71	6.1%
Jervis Gaslard	70	6%
June Caines	52	4.5%
Owen Loder	44	3.8%
Cheryl Lowe	34	2.9%
Fredrick Sinnicks (X)	13	1.1%

== Heart's Content ==
=== Town Council ===
Candidates	Votes	%
Glenda Hiscock (X)	174	11.9%
Doug Piercey (X)	157	10.7%
Tolson Rendell (X)	156	10.6%
Bradley George	153	10.4%
Clarence Brown (X)	142	9.7%
Wanda Legge	110	7.5%
Jamie Langer	107	7.3%
Dean Harris	91	6.2%
Deborah Andrew	88	6%
Hank Whelan (X)	70	4.8%
Sandra Drover	62	4.2%
Barry Langer	54	3.7%
Darlene Piercey	49	3.3%
Valerie Whelan (X)	45	3%

== Heart's Delight-Islington ==
=== Mayor ===
Candidates	Votes	%
Tina Chislett	252	54.7%
Melvin Harnum (X)	208	45.2%

=== Candidates ===
Candidates	Votes	%
Tara Bishop	314	13.4%
Aaron Bishop (X)	289	12.3%
Denise Bryant (X)	252	10.7%
Tehia Harnum-Button	224	9.5%
Tony Legge (X)	223	9.5%
Barry G. Sooley (X)	213	9.1%
Tiffany Pottle (X)	211	9%
Brady Piercey	192	8.2%
Faron Sooley (X)	181	7.7%
Karen Welsh	129	5.5%
Harrison Chislett	112	4.7%

== Heart's Desire ==
=== Town Council ===
Candidates	Votes	%
Colleen Hillier	Acclaimed	
Colleen Clarke	Acclaimed	
Terry Gauthier	Acclaimed	
Francis St. George	Acclaimed	

== Hermitage-Sandyville ==
=== Town Council ===
Candidates	Votes	%
Donald Northcotte (X)	Acclaimed	
Dennis Simms (X)	Acclaimed	

== Holyrood ==
=== Mayor ===
Candidates	Votes	%
Laura Crawley	525	61.9%
Gary Goobie (X)	323	38%

=== Town Council ===
Candidates	Votes	%
Michele Woodford (X)	684	18.2%
Bruce King (X)	573	15.3%
Steve Winsor (X)	551	14.7%
Sandra Crawley	548	14.6%
Mabel Tilley (X)	507	13.5%
Charlotte Story	456	12.1%
Sadie King (X)	422	11.2%

== Howley ==
=== Town council ===
Candidates	Votes	%
Kayla Bertrand	104	13.8%
Betty Stead (X)	86	11.4%
Margaret Quility	84	11.1%
Bernita Chislett	75	9.9%
Peg Stroud-Mountain (X)	75	9.9%
Brian Kelly (X)	73	9.7%
William Mountain	71	9.4%
Sonya Dubreuil	68	9%
Derek Murphy	59	7.8%
Brian Pilgrim	57	7.5%

== Hughes Brook ==
=== Town Council ===
Candidates	Votes	%
Debbie White (X)	Acclaimed	
Glen Gale	Acclaimed	
Gregory Lovell	Acclaimed	
Travis Park (X)	Acclaimed	
Zeke Gough	Acclaimed	

== Humber Arm South ==
=== Town Council ===
Candidates	Votes	%
Erica Humber-Shears (X)	367	15.5%
Charlene Duffy (X)	335	14.1%
Tammy Macdonald	319	13.4%
Johnny Gilbert (X)	316	13.3%
Paul Pike Jr.	300	12.6%
Nicole Parsons	264	11.1%
Aimee Pennell (X)	243	10.2%
Melissa Greene	223	9.4%

== Indian Bay ==
=== Town Council ===
Candidates	Votes	%
Dean Ennis	Acclaimed	
Marilyn Hunt	Acclaimed	
Christa Lane (X)	Acclaimed	
Judy Parsons	Acclaimed	
Michelle Smith	Acclaimed	

== Irishtown-Summerside ==
=== Town Council ===
Candidates	Votes	%
Jerry Patey	322	12.2%
Keith Goodyear	281	10.6%
Brittany Antle	259	9.8%
Clifford Bursey (X)	222	8.4%
Peggy McAuley (X)	218	8.2%
Trent Pennell	213	8%
Mark Taylor (X)	203	7.7%
Clarence Diamond	197	7.4%
Krystal Gushue (X)	193	7.3%
Shannon Morgan (X)	191	7.2%
Jeffory Hackett (X)	182	6.9%
James Murphy	154	5.8%
James McCarthy	114	4.3%
Spencer Park	77	2.9%

== Isle aux Morts ==
=== Town Council ===
Candidates	Votes	%
Colleen Hatcher	Acclaimed	
Barbra Benson	Acclaimed	
Susan Harvey	Acclaimed	
Tyler LeFrense	Acclaimed	
Thomas Herritt (X)	Acclaimed	

== Jackson's Arm ==
=== Town Council ===
Candidates	Votes	%
Shelia Hewitt	Acclaimed	
Debra House	Acclaimed	
Kirby Osmond	Acclaimed	
Debbie Wicks	Acclaimed	
Ford Osmond	Acclaimed	
Glynis Pretty	Acclaimed	

== Keels ==
Candidates	Votes	%
Ann Fitzgerald (X)	Acclaimed	
Margaret Ducey (X)	Acclaimed	

== King's Cove ==
=== Town Council ===
Candidates	Votes	%
Mike Ricketts (X)	Acclaimed	
Rosalind Walter	Acclaimed	
Mary Batterton	Acclaimed	
Brenda Penney	Acclaimed	

== King's Point ==
=== Town Council ===
Candidates	Votes	%
Skyler Budgell	Acclaimed	
Bradley Burt (X)	Acclaimed	
Brandon Burt	Acclaimed	
Perry Gillingham (X)	Acclaimed	
Peter Gillingham (X)	Acclaimed	
Travis Richards (X)	Acclaimed	

== Kippens ==
=== Town council ===
Candidates	Votes	%
Troy Duffy (X)	Acclaimed	
Derek House (X)	Acclaimed	
Vincent McGrath (X)	Acclaimed	
Eric Nippard (X)	Acclaimed	
Paul Noseworthy (X)	Acclaimed	
Susan O'Quinn	Acclaimed	

== Labrador City ==
=== Mayor ===
Labrador City returns to having a traditional mayoral ballot, rather than the previous system, where the council candidate with the most votes is elected mayor.

Candidate	Votes	%
Jordan Brown	1,080	51.85
Mitchell Marsh	732	35.14
Nick McGrath	214	10.27
Matt Fowler	57	2.74

=== Town Council ===
Candidates	Votes	%
Julia Anne Manstan	1,379	14.00
Matthew White	1,338	13.59
Reilly Farrell	1,306	13.26
Jonathan Riviere (X)	1,175	11.93
Kim Hartery (X)	1,093	11.10
Ryan Pike (X)	1,073	10.90
Karen Oldford	909	9.23
Junior Humphries (X)	886	9.00
John Penney	688	6.99

== Lamaline ==
=== Town Council ===
Candidates	Votes	%
Ralph Martin	101	18.3%
Donald Collins	97	17.6%
Todd Rose	78	14.1%
Marie Collins (X)	73	13.2%
Wayne King (X)	63	11.4%
Susan Cake	53	9.6%
Tracey Loder (X)	49	8.9%
Bonnie Ayers	36	6.5%

== L'Anse-au-Clair ==
=== Town Council ===
Candidates	Votes	%
Philip Chubbs	Acclaimed	
Shelia Chubbs	Acclaimed	
Patricia Jones	Acclaimed	
Sandra Thomas	Acclaimed	

== L'Anse-au-Loup ==
=== Town Council ===
Candidates	Votes	%
Dexter Linstead (X)	245	14.2%
Murray O'Brien	198	11.5%
Jordan Barney	171	9.9%
Stanley Linstead	163	9.4%
Deborah Barney (X)	155	9%
Trent O'Brien (X)	152	8.8%
Laura Oates	129	7.5%
Tyrone Normore (X)	129	7.5%
Nancy Fillier	105	6.1%
Bernadette Normore (X)	93	5.4%
Veronica Rose	90	5.2%
Hedley Ryland (X)	89	5.1%

== Lark Harbour ==
=== Town Council ===
Candidates	Votes	%
Wade Park	98	19.2%
Kimberley Herritt (X)	95	18.7%
Andrew Francis	82	16.1%
Michael Childs	79	15.5%
Dean MacDonald	78	15.3%
Jeff Childs	76	14.9%

== LaScie ==
=== Town Council ===
Candidates	Votes	%
Marlene Regular (X)	Acclaimed	
Cheyenne Andrews (X)	Acclaimed	
Ashley Ward (X)	Acclaimed	
Alicia Gray	Acclaimed	
Helen Bowers (X)	Acclaimed	
Cassandra Butt	Acclaimed	
Hunter Burton	Acclaimed	

== Lawn ==
=== Town Council ===
Candidates	Votes	%
JeanAnn Lambert	222	14%
Shane Kearney (X)	214	13.5%
David Pretty (X)	198	12.5%
Paul Slaney (X)	151	9.5%
John Strang (X)	144	9%
Jacqueline Strang (X)	135	8.5%
Joe Strang	109	6.8%
Catherine Drake-Edwards	94	5.9%
Eileen Thorne (X)	78	4.9%
David Drake	77	4.8%
Michael Kearney	76	4.7%
Peter Haley	54	3.4%
David Edwards	32	2%

== Leading Tickles ==
=== Town Council ===
Candidates	Votes	%
Melissa Chippett (X)	Acclaimed	
Dexter Loveman	Acclaimed	
Clayton Blundell (X)	Acclaimed	
Leona Newman (X)	Acclaimed	
Carolyn Crooke	Acclaimed	
Caralee Hemeon	Acclaimed	

== Lewin's Cove ==
=== Town Council ===
Candidates	Votes	%
Astrid Robere	Acclaimed	
James Mullett	Acclaimed	
Matthew Conway	Acclaimed	
Priscilla Burbridge	Acclaimed	
Scott Inkpen	Acclaimed	
Tina Hoben	Acclaimed	

== Lewisporte ==
=== Mayor ===
Candidate	Votes	%
Krista Freake (X)	Acclaimed	

=== Town Council ===
Candidates	Votes	%
Betty Clarke	582	14.2%
Lisa Grimes	543	13.2%
Derek White (X)	539	13.1%
Ken Tucker (X)	528	12.9%
John Mullett (X)	496	12.1%
Perry Pond (X)	489	11.9%
Brian Hooper	480	11.7%
Roxanne Haliburton (X)	432	10.5%

== Little Bay ==
=== Town Council ===
Candidates	Votes	%
Iris Stone	62	18.1%
Phyllis Simms (X)	55	16.1%
Delores Armstrong	50	14.6%
Larry Bennett	46	13.4%
Elizabeth Carroll	38	11.1%
Gail Stamp	37	10.8%
Annette Colbourne	19	5.5%
Tammy Norman	15	4.3%
Lorne Tizzard	13	3.8%
Keith Norman	6	0.17%

== Little Bay East ==
=== Town Council ===
Candidates	Votes	%
Cora Scott (X)	Acclaimed	
Stanley Clarke	Acclaimed	
Clyde Scott	Acclaimed	
Daphne Bonnell	Acclaimed	
Susan (Sue) Neilson	Acclaimed	

== Little Bay Islands ==
=== Mayor ===
Candidate	Votes	%
Michael Parsons (X)	Acclaimed	

=== Town Council ===
Candidate	Votes	%
Georgina Parsons (X)	Acclaimed	

== Little Burnt Bay ==
=== Town Council ===
Candidates	Votes	%
Barbara Moreau (X)	Acclaimed	

== Logy Bay-Middle Cove-Outer Cove ==
=== Mayor ===
Candidates	Votes	%
Bradley Power	431	56%
Denis Hickey	388	44%

=== Town Council ===
Candidates	Votes	%
Brian Roche (X)	602	17.8%
Shannon Power (X)	600	17.7%
Rosalyn Kinsella (X)	575	17%
Ashley Jackson Politi (X)	442	13%
Michelle Hickey	409	12.1%
Jennifer Anderson	394	11.6%
Ignacia Diaz	355	10%

== Long Harbour-Mount Arlington Heights ==
=== Town Council ===
Candidates	Votes	%
Walter Keating (X)	Acclaimed	

== Lord's Cove ==
=== Town Council ===
Candidates	Votes	%
John Hennebury (X)	Acclaimed	
Margaret Martin (X)	Acclaimed	

== Lourdes ==
=== Town Council ===
Candidates	Votes	%
Henry Gaudon	53	18.8%
Ashley Bungay	43	15.3%
Aurelia Drake	41	14.5%
Delsie Greene	39	13.8%
Darren Smith	38	13.5%
Richard Poirier	27	9.6%
Randy Hunt	26	9.2%
Helen Howell	14	4.9%

== Lumsden ==
=== Town Council ===
Candidates	Votes	%
Natalie Norman	Acclaimed	
Damien Gibbons	Acclaimed	
Leann Goodyear	Acclaimed	
Kayla Hicks	Acclaimed	
Chris Robbins	Acclaimed	
Basil Goodyear	Acclaimed	

== Lushes Bight-Beaumont-Beaumont North ==
=== Town Council ===
Candidates	Votes	%
Leslie Hurley (X)	78	10.9%
Trevor Rideout	78	10.9%
Monda Oake (X)	73	10.2%
Shane Slade	59	8.2%
Mildred Colbourne	49	6.8%
Maurice Burton	48	6.7%
Danny Heath (X)	47	6.5%
Jacqueline Morgan	44	6.1%
Shona Nimmo	37	5.1%

== Main Brook ==
=== Mayor ===
Candidates	Votes	%
Ian Brenton (X)	Acclaimed	

=== Town Council ===
Candidates	Votes	%
Ben Wiper	Acclaimed	
Danielle Smith	Acclaimed	
Donna Gibbons Caines (X)	Acclaimed	
Kayla Pilgrim	Acclaimed	
Teresa Noble	Acclaimed	
Troy Rumbolt	Acclaimed	

== Mary's Harbour ==
=== Town Council ===
Candidates	Votes	%
Stephen Ryan	Accliamed	
Leonard Ryan	Accliamed	
Howard Gibbons	Accliamed	
David Fagan	Accliamed	
Yvonne Bishop	Accliamed	

== Marystown ==
=== Mayor ===
Candidate	Votes	%
Gerry Brenton	1,176	54.27
Andrew Walsh	623	28.75
Bridget Hodder	368	16.98

=== Town Council ===
Candidates	Votes	%
Robert Warr	1,617	15.88
Andy Edwards (X)	1,579	15.51
Keith Keating (X)	1,208	11.87
Frank (Gary) Myles (X)	1,176	11.55
Joan Brown	1,093	10.74
Georgina (Jean) Brushett	979	9.62
Kayla Coady	975	9.58
Steven Breon	916	9.00
Colby Douglas	638	6.27

== Massey Drive ==
=== Town Council ===
Candidates	Votes	%
Don Brown (X)	Acclaimed	
Tom Howe	Acclaimed	
Kerry Ryland (X)	Acclaimed	
Penny Piercey (X)	Acclaimed	
Roger Targett (X)	Acclaimed	
Gary Warren (X)	Acclaimed	
Dianna Wiseman (X)	Acclaimed	

== McIvers ==
=== Town Council ===
Candidates	Votes	%
Susan Park- White (X)	143	18%
Tina Pennell	131	16.5%
Herman Matthews (X)	128	16.1%
Marcel Payne	125	15.7%
Kirk Lovell	89	11.2%
Greg Dawe	81	10.2%
Gerri Lynn Curtis (X)	69	8.7%
Terry Francis	26	3.2%

== Meadows ==
=== Town Council ===
Candidates	Votes	%
Trevor Legge (X)	Acclaimed	
Judy Bolt (X)	Acclaimed	
Chantille Brake	Acclaimed	

== Middle Arm ==
=== Mayor ===
Candidates	Votes	%
Neville Robinson (X)	196	82%
Danielle Chipp	44	18%

=== Town Council ===
Candidates	Votes	%
Jessica Dicks	175	13.1%
Kyle Noseworthy	168	12.6%
Morris Chipp (X)	159	11.9%
Robert Robinson (X)	135	10.1%
Barry Robinson (X)	134	10.1%
Jason Mitchell (X)	84	6.3%
Len Hodgson	80	6%
Bobby Hull (X)	79	5.9%
Ashley Tilley	74	5.5%
Pansy Mitchell	72	5.4%
Taylor Tilley (X)	53	3.9%
Jamie Burton	50	3.7%
Edna Morris	35	2.6%
Josephine Thomas	28	2.1%

== Miles Cove ==
=== Town Council ===
Candidates	Votes	%
Wayne Burton (X)		
Wilfred Fudge (X)		
Kimberley Grimes (X)		
Melvin Morey (X)		
Denzil Reid (X)		
Patsy Rideout		
Shirley Rowsell		

Results are not yet posted!

== Millertown ==
=== Town Council ===
Candidates	Votes	%
Fiona Humber (X)	Acclaimed	
Andrew Sheppard (X)	Acclaimed	
Darrell King (X)	Acclaimed	
Sheldon Blundon (X)	Acclaimed	

== Milltown-Head of Bay d'Espoir ==
=== Town Council ===
Candidates	Votes	%
Marina Burke (X)	Acclaimed	
Garry Hickman	Acclaimed	
Nicole Inkpen	Acclaimed	
Brandon King	Acclaimed	
Sidney Lilly (X)	Acclaimed	
Zachery McDonald	Acclaimed	

== Ming's Bight ==
=== Town Council ===
Candidates	Votes	%
Noah Haas	Acclaimed	
Terry Fudge	Acclaimed	
Corey Greenham	Acclaimed	
Jason Pardy	Acclaimed	

== Morrisville ==
=== Town Council ===
Candidates	Votes	%
Andy Kendell (X)	Acclaimed	
Charity G. Taylor (X)	Acclaimed	
Patsy Kendell-Augot (X)	Acclaimed	

== Mount Carmel-Mitchells Brook-St. Catherines ==
=== Town Council ===
Candidates	Votes	%
Donna L. Power	Acclaimed	
Elaine Nash	Acclaimed	
Dave G. Butland	Acclaimed	
Kevin McDonald	Acclaimed	
Shane McEvoy	Acclaimed	

== Mount Moriah ==
=== Town Council ===
Candidates	Votes	%
Doug Hackett	170	11.8%
Brad Penney	168	11.7%
Brad Porter	165	11.5%
Rod Welshman	161	11.2%
Harold Payne	136	9.4%
Sandra Wells	118	8.2%
Shelley LeRoy	105	7.3%
James Gillam	102	7.1%
Christopher Wells	72	5%
Ashley Butt	71	4.9%
Wayne Barnes	58	4%
David Butt	58	4%
Calvin Bennett	50	3.4%

== Mount Pearl ==
=== Mayor ===
Candidates	Votes	%
Dave Aker (X)	Acclaimed	

=== City Council ===
The city of Mount Pearl has six members in its city council. All of the incumbent members were re-elected.

Candidates	Votes	%
Nicole Kieley (X)	3,859	14.14
Jim Locke (X)	3,552	13.01
Isabelle Fry (X)	3,371	12.35
Chelsea Lane (X)	3,099	11.35
Mark Rice (X)	2,927	10.72
Bill Antle (X)	2,748	10.07
Don Kelly	2,294	8.40
Wanda Tiller	2,292	8.40
Susan Pearcey	1,413	5.18
Bailey Rempel	1,104	4.04
Mike Peach	640	2.34

== Musgrave Harbour ==
=== Town Council ===
Candidates	Votes	%
Bobby Pinsent (X)	266	14.2%
Jason Chaulk (X)	250	13.3%
Vic Guy	235	12.5%
Keith Guy	226	12.1%
Kelly Croucher	181	9.6%
Mary Gillingham	163	8.7%
Hillary Hickey	143	7.6%
Frederick Pardy	142	7.6%
Rodney Bemister	135	7.2%
William Goodyear	126	6.7%

== Musgravetown ==
=== Town Council ===
Candidates	Votes	%
Valerie Burry		
Irving Cull		
Melvin Humby		
Scott lane		
Lee-Ann Greening		
Caitlin Humby		
Cassie Young		
Sandra Guzzwell		
Elaine Maeland		

Results are not posted yet!

== New Perlican ==
=== Town Council ===
Candidates	Votes	%
Ivy Piercey (X)	97	17.4%
Felix St. George (X)	88	15.8%
Derek Martin (X)	78	14%
Rayfield Harris	77	13.8%
Rick French (X)	72	12.9%
Bradley Laundry	56	10%
Peter Burridge (X)	47	8.4%
Melissa Dambrowitz	40	7.2%

== New-Wes-Valley ==
=== Mayor ===
Candidate	Votes	%
Dean Kean (X)	Acclaimed	

=== Town Council ===
Candidates	Votes	%
Ward One
Floyd Stratton	165	53.5%
Paul Vincent	143	46.4%
Ward Two
Kenneth Hoyles	170	60.7%
Janet Davis	110	39.2%
Ward Three
Danette Hann	Acclaimed	
Councillor at large (5 councillors)
Brenda Howell (X)	419	14.5%
Kyle Stratton	378	13.1%
Vickie Cross	339	11.7%
Karen Winter	331	11.4%
Marlene Kelloway	284	9.8%
Cheryl Smith	273	9.4%
Gordon White	226	7.8%
Nicholas Gauithier	225	7.7%
Grant Kelloway	221	7.6%
Justin Smith	189	6.5%

== Nipper's Harbour ==
=== Town Council ===
Candidates	Votes	%
Rex Strakes	24	20.6%
Stanley Gray	21	18.1%
Shane Batstone	20	17.2%
Cody Bowers	19	16.3%
Jerry Perry	18	15.5%
Dylan Giles	14	12%

== Norman's Cove-Long Cove ==
=== Town Council ===
Candidates	Votes	%
Donald Haley (X)	207	17.25%
Dana Piercey (X)	173	14%
Corey Hudson (X)	159	13.25%
Calvin Peach (X)	150	12.5%
Kim Hamlyn	143	12%
Marcy Newhook	137	11.4%
Tonya Newhook	136	11.3%
Myles Power	95	8%

== Norris Arm ==
=== Town Council ===
Candidates	Votes	%
John Manuel	Acclaimed	
Christopher Manuel (X)	Acclaimed	
Diana Gillis	Acclaimed	

== Norris Point ==
=== Town Council ===
Candidates	Votes	%
Sheralyn Rumbolt (X)	255	13.9%
Jeffrey Reid (X)	226	12.3%
Rudy Burridge	215	11.7%
Jill McCue-Laing	202	11%
Michael Walsh (X)	184	10%
Robert Walsh	158	8.6%
Stephen Wheeler (X)	133	7.2%
Fred Laing (X)	117	6.3%
George Tucker (X)	85	4.6%
Howard Neil	78	4.2%
Sean Walsh	75	4%
Tiffany Burt	58	3.1%
Victor Major (X)	46	2.5%

== North River ==
=== Town Council ===
Candidates	Votes	%
Kelly Hall (X)	215	18.7%
Dwight Snow (X)	181	15.7%
Blair Hurley (X)	145	12.6%
James Cummings	133	11.6%
Patrick Mackey	129	11.2%
Henry Morgan	116	10.1%
John Newell (X)	116	10.1%
Elsie Morrissey (X)	111	9.6%

== North West River ==
=== Town Council ===
Candidates	Votes	%
Melanie Blake (X)	Acclaimed	
Robin Baikie-Goodfellow	Acclaimed	
Joanne Hibbs	Acclaimed	
Evan Hillier	Acclaimed	
Jane McGillivray (X)	Acclaimed	
Darwin McGee	Acclaimed	
Jeffrey Montague	Acclaimed	

== Northern Arm ==
=== Town council ===
Candidates	Votes	%
Dennis Noseworthy	132	14.8%
Robert Hannaford (X)	130	14.6%
Shawn Goose (X)	129	14.5%
Maurice Boone	115	12.9%
Peter Chayter (X)	114	12.8%
Melinda Freake (X)	108	12.1%
Fred Butler (X)	91	10.2%
Lloyd Hunter	68	7.6%

== Old Perlican ==
=== Town Council ===
Candidates	Votes	%
Roger Tizzard (X)	171	15.5%
Ted Hopkins (X)	148	13.4%
Stella Regular	137	12.4%
Cliff Morgan (X)	131	11.9%
Brendan Power	122	11.1%
Tammy Squires (X)	117	10.6%
Lindsay Rogers	95	8.6%
Lloyd Andrews (X)	89	8.1%
Joyce Hopkins	88	8%

== Pacquet ==
=== Town Council ===
Candidates	Votes	%
Victor Andrews	Acclaimed	
Corinn Norman	Acclaimed	
Collin Greenham	Acclaimed	
Kira Rideout	Acclaimed	
Kimberley Thiele	Acclaimed	

== Paradise ==
=== Mayor ===
The incumbent mayor, Dan Bobbett, chose to run as the Liberal candidate for the district of Topsail-Paradise in the 2025 provincial election.

Candidates	Votes	%
Patrick Martin	2,204	51.63
Larry Vaters	2,065	48.37

=== Town Council ===
The town of Paradise has six members in its town council. Three of the incumbent council members ran again, and they were elected alongside three new councillors.

Candidates	Votes	%
Kimberley Street (X)	2,812	14.58
Erin Furlong	2,646	13.72
Jennifer Hiscock	2,492	12.92
Sheldon Antle	2,347	12.17
Glen "Bic" Carew (X)	2,245	11.64
Tommy Maher (X)	2,034	10.55
Kevin Power	1,828	9.48
James Martin	1,102	5.71
Tony Kelly	899	4.66
Phil Rendell	881	4.57

== Parker's Cove ==
=== Town Council ===
Candidates	Votes	%
Harold Murphy (X)	93	19.3%
Corey Hickey	88	18.3%
Alex Murphy (X)	64	13.3%
Sadie Murphy (X)	59	12.2%
Yvonne Murphy	50	10.4%
Jennifer Murphy	43	8.9%
Kyle Murphy	42	8.7%
Ambrose Abbott	41	8.5%

== Parson's Pond ==
=== Town Council ===
Candidates	Votes	%
Blaine Payne	85	14.5%
Paul Parsons (X)	80	13.6%
Robin Payne (X)	71	12.1%
Emma Maynard	53	9%
Josephine Goosney	52	8.8%
Edmund Keough	40	6.8%
Sheri Evangelene	36	6.1%
Ronnie House	36	6.1%
Cynthia Caines	32	5.4%
Stephanie Keough	32	5.4%
Braden Parsons	28	4.7%
Madeline Bavis	21	3.5%
Owen Craig Payne	19	3.2%

== Pasadena ==
=== Mayor ===
Candidates	Votes	%
Darren Gardner (X)	834	51.9%
Tom Wheaton	771	48%

=== Town Council ===
Candidates	Votes	%
Terry Randell (X)	1,315	17.2%
Brandon Hall (X)	1,064	13.9%
Carla Brake (X)	1,023	13.4%
Gary Bishop	919	12%
Kelli Lannon	771	10.1%
Claire Dugdill	743	9.7%
Stephanie Rumbolt	647	8.4%
John Peach	609	7.9%
Jan Stephen	533	6.9%

== Peterview ==
=== Mayor ===
Candidates	Votes	%
Corey Samson	174	60.4%
James Samson (X)	114	39.5%

=== Town Council ===
Candidates	Votes	%
Glenn Sheppard	175	14%
Frazer Whitt (X)	156	12.5%
Amanda Sheppard	154	12.3%
Rosalind Williams (X)	151	12.1%
Loreen Elliott	149	11.9%
Keith Humber (X)	146	11.7%
Vicki Taylor (X)	139	11.1%
Danny Taylor	104	8.3%
Jennilee Samson	71	5.7%

== Petty Harbour–Maddox Cove ==
=== Town Council ===
Candidates	Votes	%
Nancy Bungay	Acclaimed	
Todd Chafe	Acclaimed	
Edward Dyke (X)	Acclaimed	
Kayla Parsons (X)	Acclaimed	
Richard Raymond (X)	Acclaimed	
Irene Stack (X)	Acclaimed	
Samuel Stack	Acclaimed	

== Pilley's Island ==
=== Town Council ===
Candidates	Votes	%
Ben Callahan (X)	Acclaimed	
Wanda Seitl (X)	Acclaimed	
Maxwell Pittman (X)	Acclaimed	
Alexander Vincent (X)	Acclaimed	

== Pinware ==
=== Town Council ===
Candidates	Votes	%
Carl O'Dell	Acclaimed	
Curtis Butt	Acclaimed	
Elaine Pike (X)	Acclaimed	
Joanne Dorey (X)	Acclaimed	
Kerry O'Dell (X)	Acclaimed	

== Placentia ==
=== Mayor ===
Candidates	Votes	%
Jamie Neville	1,022	57%
Bernard Power	769	42.9%

=== Town Council ===
Candidates	Votes	%
Wayne D. Power (X)	1,310	15%
Kay Smith (X)	1,239	14.2%
Sheldon Slaney	1,160	13.3%
William Neville	1,149	13.2%
Gerard Wilson (X)	1,109	12.7%
Edward Tobin	983	11.2%
Jamie Barnett	642	7.3%
Edward Kelly	637	7.3%
Scott Spurvey	472	5.4%

== Point au Gaul ==
=== Town Council ===
Candidates	Votes	%
Anita Lockyer	Acclaimed	
Phyllis Lockyer	Acclaimed	
Lewis Dodge	Acclaimed	

== Point Lance ==
=== Town Council ===
Candidates	Votes	%
Maureen Young	Acclaimed	
Chantel Nash	Acclaimed	
Cathie Gardiner	Acclaimed	
Melvin Careen (X)	Acclaimed	

== Point Leamington ==
=== Town Council ===
Candidates	Votes	%
Denny Andrews (X)	234	13.1%
Rodney Decker (X)	234	13.1%
Terri Feener	212	11.8%
Connie Kinden	187	10.4%
Donna Woodworth	159	8.9%
Robert Loder	136	7.6%
Dean Thompson (X)	130	7.2%
Blaine Parker	128	7.1%
Cindy Parmiter- Hemeon	106	5.9%
Robert Elliott (X)	102	5.7%
Geoffrey Paul	85	4.7%
Debbie Hillier	71	3.9%

== Point May ==
=== Town Council ===
Candidates	Votes	%
Bonnie Maher	Acclaimed	
Danielle Stacey	Acclaimed	
Kenneth Stacey	Acclaimed	

== Point of Bay ==
=== Town Council ===
Candidates	Votes	%
Lou Eyamie	Acclaimed	
Bernard Primmer (X)	Acclaimed	
Megan Primmer	Acclaimed	
Barbara Temple	Acclaimed	
John White	Acclaimed	

== Pool's Cove ==
=== Town Council ===
Candidates	Votes	%
Josephine Marshall (X)	Acclaimed	
Glenda Blagdon (X)	Acclaimed	
Tammy Russell	Acclaimed	
Colin Williams	Acclaimed	
Darryl Evans	Acclaimed	

== Port Anson ==
=== Town Council ===
Candidates	Votes	%
Shawn Burton (X)	Acclaimed	
Randy Goudie (X)	Acclaimed	
Roger Morey (X)	Acclaimed	
Kelsey Winsor	Acclaimed	
Rex Barnes (X)	Acclaimed	

== Port au Choix ==
=== Mayor ===
Candidates	Votes	%
Donald Spence (X)	Acclaimed	

=== Town Council ===
Candidates	Votes	%
Terry Alyward (X)	215	15.2%
Alex O'keefe (X)	175	12.3%
Susan White (X)	145	10.2%
Calvin Dobbin (X)	141	9.9%
Todd House (X)	134	9.4%
Martin J. Caines	132	9.3%
Karla Gould	129	9.1%
Anita Northcott	124	8.7%
Brendon Gould	114	8%
Candace Rose (X)	93	6.5%

== Port au Port East ==
=== Town Council ===
Candidates	Votes	%
Arthur Barry (X)	131	15%
Catherine Gaudon	116	13.3%
Mark Gale	111	12.7%
Kimberley DeGroot (X)	111	12.7%
Florence Barter (X)	110	12.6%
Phillip Ryan	95	10.8%
Colleen Joseph (X)	86	9.8%
Daren Benoit	60	6.8%
Dawson Hunt-Benoit	52	5.9%

== Port au Port West-Aguathuna-Felix Cove ==
=== Town Council ===
Candidates	Votes	%
James Gabriel (X)	64	19.6%
Julie Bedo (X)	57	17.5%
Robert Tourout (X)	48	14.7%
Chalsie Kook-Marche (X)	46	14.1%
Douglas Dwyer	46	14.1%
Andrew Woodrow	45	13.8%
Kenneth Mills	19	5.8%

== Port Blandford ==
=== Town Council ===
Candidates	Votes	%
Darlene Clouter (X)	145	14.4%
Jeanine Bursey (X)	139	13.8%
Terry Roach (X)	137	13.6%
Winston Peddle (X)	132	13.1%
Clyde Oldford	127	12.6%
Matthew Bursey	123	12.2%
Rick Greening (X)	121	12%
Paul Wilson (X)	80	7.9%

== Port Hope Simpson ==
=== Town Council ===
Candidates	Votes	%
Sarah Williams	119	13.5%
Trent Parr	118	13.4%
Charlene Penney	108	12.3%
Gina Sampson Russell	100	11.4%
Edward Strugnell	96	10.9%
Fredrick George Morris	94	10.7%
Edward Skinner	83	9.4%
Gail Sampson	65	7.4%
Ford Savory	49	5.5%
Charles Savory	44	5%

== Port Kirwan ==
=== Town Council ===
Candidates	Votes	%
Eugene Brothers (X)	Acclaimed	

== Port Rexton ==
=== Town Council ===
Candidates	Votes	%
Chris Kelly (X)	129	12.6%
Penny Vivian-Penney	127	11.7%
Colette Churchill-White	118	11.5%
Janice Hayward (X)	112	11%
Eldon Bannister (X)	102	10%
Madelyn Jill White	100	9.8%
Christine Hiscock	97	9.5%
Alicia MacDonald	84	8.2%
Patricia Connolly	60	5.8%
John Vivian	53	5.2%
Jeff Piercey	36	3.5%

== Port Saunders ==
=== Mayor ===
Candidates	Votes	%
Tony Ryan (X)	228	55.8%
Steven Plowman	180	44.1%

=== Town Council ===
Candidates	Votes	%
Janet Ryan	285	13.1%
Helena Biggin (X)	226	10.4%
Kimberley Ryan	223	10.3%
Stacy Plowman	214	9.8%
Danica Gill-White (X)	212	9.7%
Ann Scanlon-Ryan	184	8.5%
Zoe Wells	178	8.2%
Macavoy Lavers (X)	164	7.5%
Angela Hamlyn-patey	162	7.4%
Lisa Biggin	135	6.2%
Lacey Wells	98	4.5%
Peter Kennedy (X)	83	3.8%

== Portugal Cove South ==
=== Town Council ===
Candidates	Votes	%
William Hartery (X)	Acclaimed	
Rowena Nichol (X)	Acclaimed	
Keith Stampe	Acclaimed	
Michael Ward	Acclaimed	

== Portugal Cove–St. Philip's ==
=== Mayor ===
Candidates	Votes	%
Dave Bartlett	1,453	47.05
Johnny Hanlon	822	26.62
Madonna Stewart-Sharpe	813	26.33

=== Town council ===
Candidates	Votes	%
Kim Churchill	1,717	12%
Robert Stapleton	1,413	10%
Erin Gallant	1,261	8.7%
Wendy Squires-Ennis	1,101	7.6%
Gavin Will (X)	1,056	7.3%
Keith Culleton	1,022	7%
Loretta O'leary	869	6%
Cyril Hayden (X)	855	5.9%
Sheldon Russell	841	5.8%
Darryl J. Harding (X)	755	5%
Karen Dawe-Hale	710	4.9%
Jenine Tucker	696	4.8%
Krista Scott	653	4.5%
Janet Martin	633	4.4%
Erik Fisher	464	3.2%
Dana Metcalfe	308	2.1%

== Pouch Cove ==
=== Mayor ===
Candidates	Votes	%
Brad Richards	514	70%
Greg King	220	30%

=== Town Council ===
Candidates	Votes	%
Tony Palmer	Acclaimed	
Antony Luchford	Acclaimed	
Charlotte Richards	Acclaimed	
Kate Sullivan (X)	Acclaimed	
Danny Connors (X)	Acclaimed	
Derek Spraklin	Acclaimed	

== Raleigh ==
=== Town Council ===
Candidates	Votes	%
Boyd Bessey	89	20.3%
Helen Greene	79	18%
Raymond Taylor	75	17.1%
Sherman Elliott	68	15.5%
Vianne Smith	54	12.3%
John Taylor	48	10.9%
Laura Smith	24	5.4%

== Ramea ==
=== Town Council ===
Candidates	Votes	%
Kelly Keeping (X)	Acclaimed	
Mark Carter	Acclaimed	
Maxine Stewart (X)	Acclaimed	
Stephen Delong	Acclaimed	
Laura Kendell	Acclaimed	
Ian Stewart (X)	Acclaimed	
Lester Gould	Acclaimed	

== Red Bay ==
=== Town Council ===
Candidates	Votes	%
Eric Paul	Acclaimed	
Robert Stone	Acclaimed	
Wanita Stone	Acclaimed	
Shena Fowler	Acclaimed	
Faren Yetman	Acclaimed	

== Red Harbour ==
=== Town Council ===
Candidates	Votes	%
Cory Miller (X)	Acclaimed	
Joan Green (X)	Acclaimed	
Margie Kenway (X)	Acclaimed	
Steve Breon (X)	Acclaimed	
Jamie Grondin (X)	Acclaimed	

== Reidville ==
=== Town Council ===
Candidates	Votes	%
David Reid (X)	131	19.7%
Nancy Anstey (X)	129	19.4%
Clarence Moss	127	19.1%
Zina Reid-Brezinski (X)	105	15.8%
Skye Curlew	97	14.6%
Wendy Hayden	75	11.2%

== Rencontre East ==
=== Town Council ===
Candidates	Votes	%
Peter Giovannini (X)	46	15.2%
Margaret Caines	44	14.6%
James Hardy (X)	43	14.2%
Brian Duke (X)	42	13.9%
Christopher Duke (X)	38	12.6%
Bruce Hatter (X)	38	12.6%
Duane Legrow (X)	35	11.6%
Tristan Fiander	15	4.9%

== Renews-Cappahayden ==
=== Town Council ===
Candidates	Votes	%
John Will Brazil	Acclaimed	
Glenn Chidley	Acclaimed	
Natalie Brazil	Acclaimed	
Terri-lynn Mullowney	Acclaimed	
Ryan Dort	Acclaimed	
John (Jack) Lawlor (X)	Acclaimed	

== River of Ponds ==
=== Town Council ===
Candidates	Votes	%
Muriel Patey (X)	Acclaimed	
Eric Patey (X)	Acclaimed	
Hiram House	Acclaimed	
Terry Patey (X)	Acclaimed	

== Riverhead ==
=== Town Council ===
Candidates	Votes	%
Michael Fagan	101	19.5%
Nicole Lambert	100	19.3%
Glen Squires	93	17.9%
Kelly Lee	61	11.7%
Joseph Fitzgerald	61	11.7%
Arlene Corcoran	53	10.2%
Darrell Roberts	48	9.2%

== Roberts Arm ==
=== Town Council ===
Candidates	Votes	%
Terry Randell	260	14.1%
Gregory Strickland	204	11%
Donald Paddock (X)	201	10.9%
Glenn Winsor (X)	195	10.5%
Derrick Hicks (X)	159	8.6%
Ronald Walsh	159	8.6%
Vanessa Pittman	156	8.4%
Laura Tizzard	133	7.2%
Courtney Warr	132	7.1%
Paul Oake	115	6.2%
Alice Heath	80	4.3%
Ashley LeBlanc	48	2.6%

== Rocky Harbour ==
=== Town Council ===
Candidates	Votes	%
Chris Temple	250	15.5%
Walter Nicolle	238	14.8%
Sean St. George	234	14.5%
Gary Pittman	212	13.2%
Patricia Cullihall (X)	207	12.9%
Chevonne Fisher	198	12.3%
Robert Bugden	157	9.7%
Randy Clance	108	6.7%

== Roddickton-Bide Arm ==
=== Mayor ===
Candidates	Votes	%
Phyllis Randell	264	70%
Naaman Canning	115	30%

=== Town Council ===
Candidates	Votes	%
Ward 1
Lynn Ellsworth	Acclaimed	
Ward 2
Rochelle Canning (X)	Acclaimed	
At-large (Elect 4 councillors)
Dianne Weir-Rowsell	316	23%
Daniel Simms (X)	285	20.8%
Meryl Carroll (X)	216	15.7%
Wade Norman	208	15.1%
Della DeMoss	202	14.7%
John Decker	142	10.3%

== Rose Blanche-Harbour le Cou ==
=== Town Council ===
Candidates	Votes	%
Gary Bateman (X)	136	13.5%
Ruby Porter	136	13.5%
Frank Touchings (X)	111	11%
Lisa Parsons	102	10.1%
Phillip Fiander	94	9.3%
Hartley Taylor	91	9%
Gordon Edwards	81	8%
David Bernard	76	7.5%
Roland Gooselin	72	7.1%
Alexander Parsons	69	6.8%
Craig Savoury	37	3.6%

== Rushoon ==
=== Town Council ===
Candidates	Votes	%
Laurie Quann-Moores	62	19.8%
Sheldon Whiffen	62	19.8%
Angus Moores	61	19.5%
Ellen Lundrigan	54	17.3%
Nakita Whiffen	39	12.5%
Michael Gaulton	34	10.8%

== Salmon Cove ==
=== Town Council ===
Candidates	Votes	%
Kelly Russell	198	16.4%
Scott Butt	167	13.8%
Wallace Rose	157	13%
Garry Butt	137	11.3%
Ryan Burton	130	10.7%
Marylynn Layman (X)	127	10.5%
Jonathon Whiteway (X)	114	9.4%
Edna Lambert (X)	97	8%
Cassie Kelloway	80	6.6%

== Salvage ==
=== Town Council ===
Candidates	Votes	%
Gertie Brown	Acclaimed	
Bruce Critchley (X)	Acclaimed	
Gord Janes	Acclaimed	
Shar-lett Matchim	Acclaimed	
Joyce Penney	Acclaimed	

== Sandringham ==
=== Town Council ===
Candidates	Votes	%
Dwayne Samson	56	18%
Meletta Harvey	45	14.4%
Paul George	40	12.8%
Kim Brown	39	12.5%
Sharon Burry	39	12.5%
Glenn Arnold (X)	33	10.6%
Rodney Hapgood	30	9.6%
Karen Saunders	29	9.3%

== Sandy Cove ==
=== Town Council ===
Candidates	Votes	%
Clarke Matchim (X)	Acclaimed	
Cluny Matchim (X)	Acclaimed	
Keith Moss (X)	Acclaimed	
Harvey Senior (X)	Acclaimed	
Shelia Kelly Blackmore (X)	Acclaimed	
Paul Moss	Acclaimed	
Beverley King	Acclaimed	

== Seal Cove (Fortune Bay) ==
=== Town Council ===
Candidates	Votes	%
Amanda Langdon	Acclaimed	
Dale Mullins	Acclaimed	
Junior Abbott	Acclaimed	
Dwayne Bungay	Acclaimed	
Maisie Simms	Acclaimed	

== Seal Cove (White bay) ==
=== Town Council ===
Candidates	Votes	%
Paul Maclsaac (X)	78	15.2%
Adam Gillingham (X)	72	14.1%
Connie Farrell (X)	65	12.7%
Monique Lapointe	64	12.5%
Mildred Gillingham (X)	57	11.1%
Andrew Gillingham	51	10%
Hughie Eveleigh	42	8.2%
Lydia Banks	34	6.6%
Victoria Banks	34	6.6%
Erica Gavin	13	2.5%

== Small Point-Adam's Cove-Blackhead-Broad Cove ==
Candidates	Votes	%
Curtis Delaney (X)	Acclaimed	
Mark Ploughman (X)	Acclaimed	
Paul Adams (X)	Acclaimed	
Susan Rose (X)	Acclaimed	
Annalea Pudan-Sproule	Acclaimed	

== South Brook ==
=== Town Council ===
Candidates	Votes	%
Sherman McKay	206	14.7%
Justine Thomas	192	13.7%
Winnie Matthews	191	13.6%
Crissie Downey	157	11.2%
Rocky Morey	147	10.5%
Gloria Andrews	144	10.2%
Katie Chippett	144	10.2%
Roy Thomas	134	9.5%
Wallace McKay	85	6%

== South River ==
=== Town Council ===
Candidates	Votes	%
Pat Curran (X)	Acclaimed	
Herbert Hedd	Acclaimed	
Melissa Hierlihy (X)	Acclaimed	
David Petten (X)	Acclaimed	
Eric Snow (X)	Acclaimed	
Maggie Snow	Acclaimed	
Bev Wells (X)	Acclaimed	

== Southern Harbour ==
=== Town Council ===
Candidates	Votes	%
Joseph Brewer (X)	108	15.2%
Lana Parsons (X)	94	13.3%
Peter Leonard	93	13.1%
Sarah Bennett	92	13%
Brian Parsons (X)	87	12.3%
Tapanga Best	83	11.7%
Chantel Giles	83	11.7%
Denise Ryan (X)	37	5.2%
Ambrose Emberley (X)	29	4.1%

== Spaniard's Bay ==
=== Mayor ===
Candidates	Votes	%
Tammy Oliver	536	51.7%
Darlene Stamp	499	48.2%

=== Town Council ===
Candidates	Votes	%
Gerald Sheppard	714	15.6%
Terry Sheppard	654	14.3%
Sherry Lundrigan (X)	628	13.7%
Ann Marie Singleton	598	13%
Debbie Newman (X)	590	12.9%
Darren Smith	535	11.7%
John Churchill	447	9.7%
Sharlene Walsh	401	8.7%

== Springdale ==
=== Town Council ===
Candidates	Votes	%
Jenna Young-Blanchard (X)	514	11.1%
Alex Goudie (X)	494	10.7%
Dave Edison (X)	466	10%
Corey Rideout (X)	445	9.6%
Margo Burton	434	9.4%
Erica Chatman (X)	425	9.2%
Rhodes Pelley (X)	409	8.8%
Jonathan Edison	404	8.7%
Jill Upward	261	5.6%
Jeff Tizzard (X)	254	5.5%
Alex Regular	184	3.9%
Stephen Jewer	167	3.6%
Justin Hewlett	158	3.4%

== St. Alban's ==
=== Town Council ===
Candidates	Votes	%
Peter Collier	202	13.7%
Adam Willcott (X)	192	13%
Sheldon Collier (X)	190	12.9%
Kevin Collier	178	12.1%
Jamie Kendell (X)	166	11.3%
Lucas Organ (X)	162	11%
Garard (Bob) Murphy (X)	156	10.6%
Terri Lynn Dwyer (X)	155	10.5%
Alex Calsavara	68	4.6%

== St. Anthony ==
=== Mayor ===
Candidates	Votes	%
Michelle Tucker	576	74%
Boyd Noel	203	26%

=== Town Council ===
Candidates	Votes	%
Mark Pilgrim (X)	628	14.6%
Aaron Coffin (X)	600	13.9%
Carolyn Janes (X)	568	13.2%
Glenda Noble	559	13%
Shawn Green	505	11.7%
Byron Kinsella (X)	469	10.9%
Craig Ball	463	10.8%
Katrina Noel (X)	419	9.7%
Alwyn Nicholas	76	1.75

== St. Bernard's-Jacques Fontaine ==
=== Mayor ===
Candidate	Votes	%
Wally Scott (X)	Acclaimed	

=== Town Council ===
Candidates	Votes	%
Edison Dominaux	134	16.4%
Carl Myles	129	15.7%
Elizabeth Wall	115	14%
John Hickman	103	12.6%
Craig Bungay	93	11.3%
Tracy Whittle	89	10.8%
Terrence Baker	89	10.8%
Guy Brushett	65	7.9%

== St. Brendan's ==
=== Town Council ===
Candidates	Votes	%
Bill Broderick (X)	Acclaimed	
Jamie Aylward (X)	Acclaimed	
Madonna Furlong (X)	Acclaimed	
Harold Kelly (X)	Acclaimed	
Patricia Ryan (X)	Acclaimed	

== St. Bride's ==
=== Mayor ===
Candidates	Votes	%
Glenn Lake		
Glenn Lake		
Eugene Manning (X)		

=== Town Council ===
Candidates	Votes	%
Jenna Corcoran		
Isabella Conway		
David Penney		
Rhonda Young		
Donna Dohey		
David Penney		
Rhonda Young		

Results not yet posted!

== St. George's ==
=== Town Council ===
Candidates	Votes	%
Conrad White (X)	221	13.00%
Bernard Mason	208	12.24%
Selina White	195	11.47%
John Pittman	177	10.41%
Joe Blanchard	176	10.35%
Sharon O’Neil Parsons	158	9.29%
Jean Legge	158	9.29%
Andy Tobin (X)	156	9.18%
Evan Louvelle	134	7.88%
William Vincent	116	6.82%

== St. Jacques-Coomb's Cove ==
=== Town Council ===
Candidates	Votes	%
Bruce Vallis (X)	Acclaimed	
Rodney Evans (X)	Acclaimed	
Kevin Lawrence (X)	Acclaimed	
Joel Cormier	Acclaimed	

== St. John's ==
2025 St. John's Mayoral election
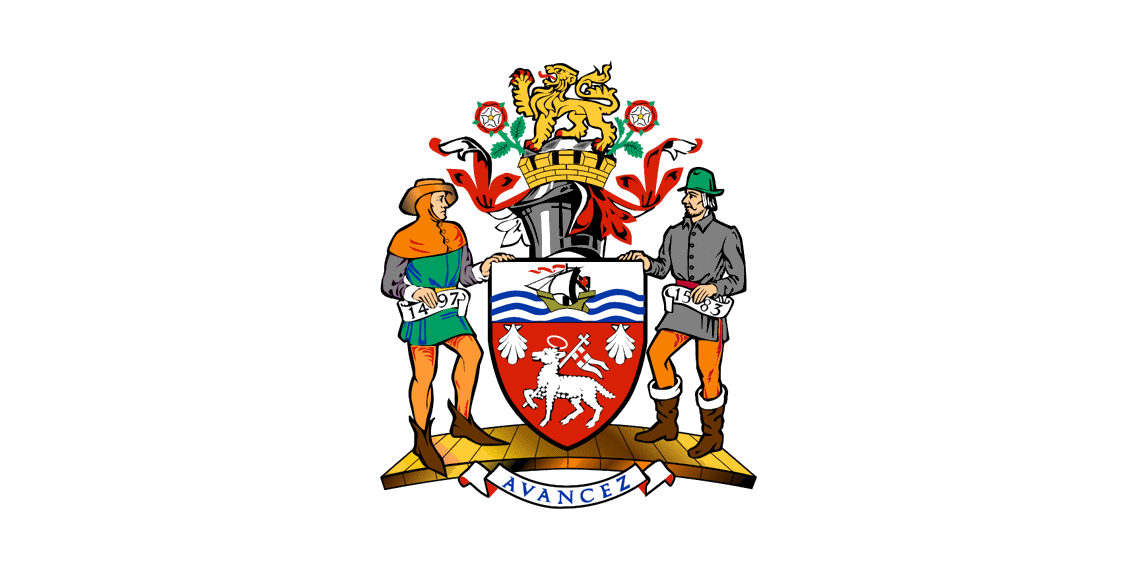
- October 8, 2025
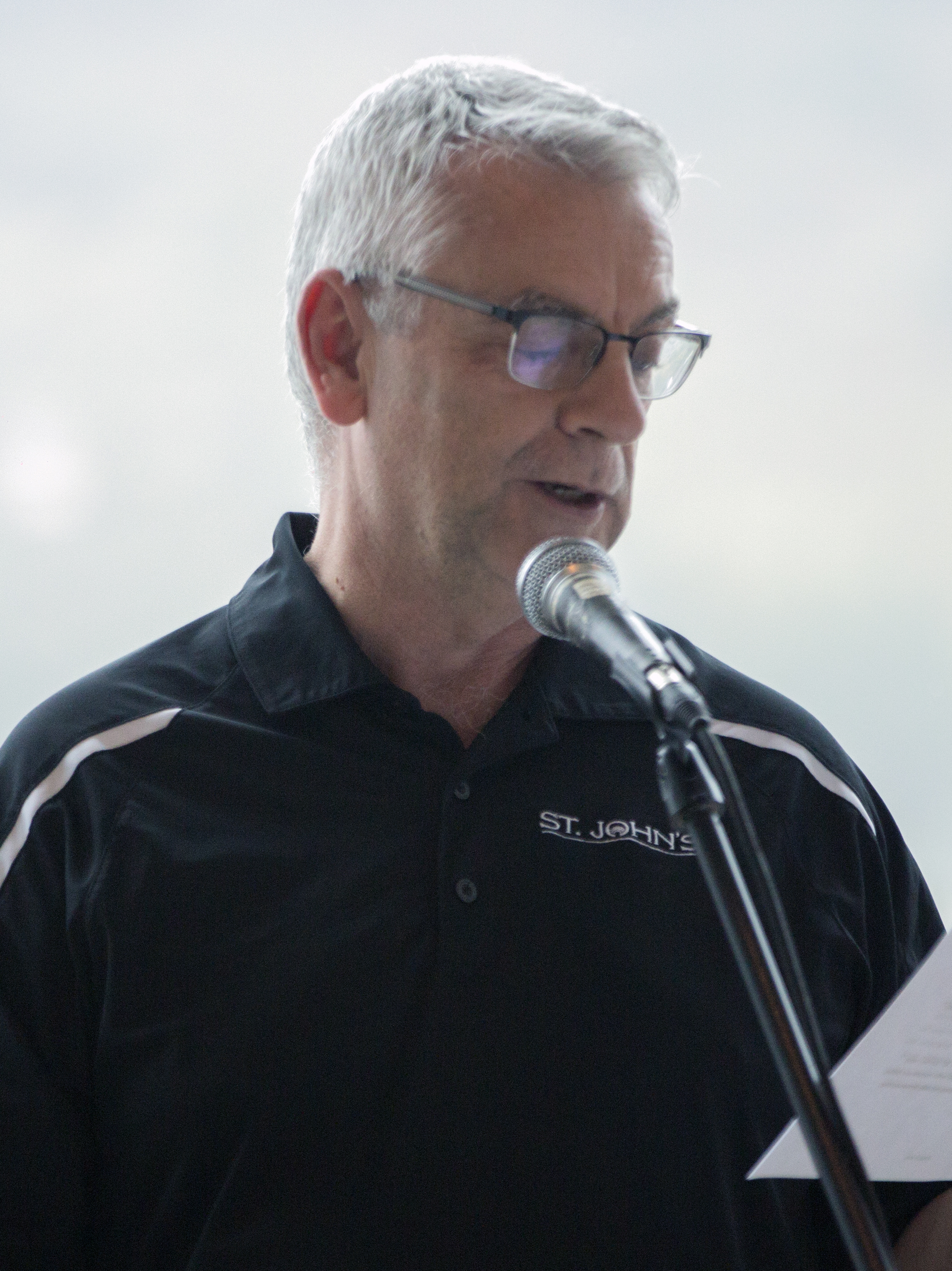
		IH
Candidate	Danny Breen	Ivy Hanley
Popular vote	15,216	11,603
Percentage	56.74	43.26
Mayor before election
Danny Breen
Elected mayor
Danny Breen

The election was delayed to October 8, 2025, due to the Canada Post strike.

=== Mayor ===
Candidates	Votes	%
Danny Breen (X)	15,216	56.74
Ivy Hanley	11,603	43.26

=== Deputy Mayor ===
Candidates	Votes	%
Ron Ellsworth	14,787	57.19
Bianca Lono	8,636	33.40
Rigel Penman	2,435	9.42

=== City Council ===
Candidates	Votes	%
Ward 1
Jill Bruce (X)	Acclaimed	
Ward 2
Brenda Halley	2,525	48.13
Greg Smith	1,567	29.87
Todd Perrin	471	8.98
Blair Trainor	305	5.81
Greg Dunne	286	5.45
Philip Barton	92	1.75
Ward 3
Greg Noseworthy (X)	Acclaimed	
Ward 4
Tom Davis (X)	2,812	69.04
Trini Bragg	1,261	30.96
Ward 5
Donnie Earle	3,687	59.16
Carl Ridgeley (X)	2,545	40.84
At Large (4 councillors)
Kate Cadigan	16,577	17.92
Lynn Hammond	11,868	12.83
Sandy Hickman (X)	11,837	12.80
Nikita Ryall	10,124	10.95
Art Puddister	8,235	8.90
Walter Harding	7,994	8.64
Scott Fitzgerald	7,885	8.53
Myles Russell	6,846	7.40
Paul Combden	4,551	4.92
John Barbour	3,576	3.87
Wallace Ryan	2,589	2.80
Thomas Pouliot	402	0.43

== St. Joseph's ==
=== Town Council ===
Candidates	Votes	%
Joanie Dobbin	Acclaimed	
Petrina Daley	Acclaimed	
Brenda pender	Acclaimed	
Gary Daley	Acclaimed	
James Daley	Acclaimed	

== St. Lawrence ==
=== Town Council ===
Candidates	Votes	%
Lisa Loder	378	12%
Colleen Miller (X)	331	10.5%
Ernest Lundrigan (X)	315	10%
Amanda Slaney (X)	311	9.9%
Kevin Pittman (X)	290	9.2%
Rodney Doyle Sr. (X)	287	9.1%
Karl Tarrant	252	8%
Gary Pike	245	7.8%
Craig Hutchings	242	7.7%
Hubert Beck	180	5.7%
Daniel Farrell	171	5.4%
Andre (Andy) Hillier	127	4%

== St. Lewis ==
=== Town Council ===
Candidates	Votes	%
Helen Poole	Acclaimed	
Bradley Curl Sr.	Acclaimed	
Jody Jenkins	Acclaimed	
Cassandra Curl	Acclaimed	
Amanda Chubbs	Acclaimed	

== St. Lunaire-Griquet ==
=== Mayor ===
Candidates	Votes	%
Dale Colbourne (X)	129	43.2%
Dexter Burden	87	29.1%
Joy Collins	82	27.5%

=== Town Council ===
Candidates	Votes	%
Tammy Anderson (X)	Acclaimed	
Judy Burden	Acclaimed	
Kathy Burden	Acclaimed	
Miranda Burden	Acclaimed	
Jennifer Carroll	Acclaimed	
Catherine Humby (X)	Acclaimed	

== St. Mary's ==
=== Mayor ===
Candidate	Votes	%
Stephen Ryan (X)	Acclaimed	

=== Town Council ===
Candidates	Votes	%
Yvonne Bishop (X)	123	18.6%
Leonard Ryan (X)	115	17.4%
Howard Gibbons (X)	109	16.5%
David Fagan (X)	106	16%
Sylvester Yetman	82	12.4%
Muriel Whelan	66	10%
Daphne Hayward	59	8.9%

== St. Pauls ==
=== Town Council ===
Candidates	Votes	%
Brandon Bennett	Acclaimed	
Gregory Payne	Acclaimed	
Melvin Reid (X)	Acclaimed	
Devin Pittman	Acclaimed	
Donovan Bryan	Acclaimed	

== St. Shott's ==
=== Town Council ===
Candidates	Votes	%
Rick Myrick (X)	Acclaimed	
Anita Molloy	Acclaimed	
Alonzo Molloy	Acclaimed	
Loretta Molloy (X)	Acclaimed	
Barbara Myrick	Acclaimed	

== St. Vincent's-St. Stephen's-Peter's River ==
=== Town Council ===
Candidates	Votes	%
Verna Hayward	Acclaimed	
Angela Fleming	Acclaimed	
Cynthia Hicks	Acclaimed	
Peter St. Croix	Acclaimed	
Janice Fleming	Acclaimed	

== Steady Brook ==
=== Town Council ===
Candidates	Votes	%
Sarah Kennedy-Dyson (X)	Acclaimed	
William Dawson (X)	Acclaimed	
Derek Morrissey (X)	Acclaimed	
Don Diamond (X)	Acclaimed	
Diana Douglas (X)	Acclaimed	
Ken Wheeler	Acclaimed	

== Stephenville ==
=== Mayor ===
Candidate	Votes	%
Bob Byrnes	1,130	53.18
Cecil Stein	594	27.95
Susan Follow	284	13.36
Gerard Power	117	5.51

=== Town Council ===
Candidates	Votes	%
Darren Roberts (X)	1,238	12.44
Maurice Hynes (X)	1,193	11.99
Lenny Tiller	1,181	11.87
Tom O'Brien (X)	1,148	11.53
Craig Butt	1,025	10.30
Paul Green	1,006	10.11
Mark Felix	1,002	10.07
Chauna Hickey	874	8.78
Pamela Bennett-McLeod	631	6.34
Donald White	365	3.67
Gerard Pomeroy	290	2.91

== Stephenville Crossing ==
=== Town Council ===
Candidates	Votes	%
Tom Brake	266	13.64%
Brian Downey (X)	251	12.87%
Sean King (X)	243	12.46%
Lisa Lucas (X)	239	12.26%
Kim Nolan	232	11.90%
Anna Blanchard-Brake (X)	226	11.59%
Cynthia Downey (X)	187	9.59%
Brian Joy (X)	164	8.41%
Sharon Bennett (X)	141	7.23%

== Summerford ==
Candidates	Votes	%
Derrick Brown	Acclaimed	
Kevin Barnes	Acclaimed	
Emily Adams	Acclaimed	
Kimberley Jenkins	Acclaimed	
Kimberley Watkins	Acclaimed	
Perry Small	Acclaimed	
Thomas Barnes	Acclaimed	

== Sunnyside ==
=== Town council ===
Candidates	Votes	%
Wanda Simmonds	Acclaimed	
Harry Hiscock	Acclaimed	
Todd Foote	Acclaimed	
Donna Keefe	Acclaimed	
Roger Snook (X)	Acclaimed	
Derrick Marsh	Acclaimed	
Murray Smith	Acclaimed	

== Terra Nova ==
=== Town Council ===
Candidates	Votes	%
Andrea Cornell	Acclaimed	
Julie Pike (X)	Acclaimed	
Linda Hillier-Smith (X)	Acclaimed	
Valerie Storie	Acclaimed	

== Terrenceville ==
=== Town Council ===
Candidates	Votes	%
Felix Clarke	Acclaimed	
Irene Augot	Acclaimed	
Edward Crane	Acclaimed	
John Mitchell	Acclaimed	
Gerald Cox	Acclaimed	

== Tilt Cove ==
=== Mayor ===
Candidate	Votes	%
Donald Collins (X)	Acclaimed	

=== Town Council ===
Candidates	Votes	%
Jerry Winsor (X)	Acclaimed	
Nina Winsor (X)	Acclaimed	

== Torbay ==
=== Mayor ===
Candidate	Votes	%
Craig Scott (X)	1,056	42.21
Mary Thorne-Gosse	783	31.29
Trina Appleby	663	26.50

=== Town Council ===
Candidates	Votes	%
Colleen Tapper	1,487	13.46
Scott Martin	1,332	12.06
Tony Pollard (X)	1,247	11.29
Karen Gosse	1,140	10.32
Rhonda Manning (X)	1,052	9.52
Jennifer Whitten	1,029	9.31
Laurie Furlong	1,015	9.19
Paul Thomey	989	8.95
Dalton Tapper	880	7.97
Sam Gosse	876	7.92

== Traytown ==
=== Town Council ===
Candidates	Votes	%
Shannon Carter (X)	Acclaimed	
Jason Patten (X)	Acclaimed	
Roy Higdon (X)	Acclaimed	
Mike Ralph	Acclaimed	
Jeff Patten	Acclaimed	

== Trepassey ==
=== Town Council ===
Candidates	Votes	%
Margaret Ryan	Acclaimed	
Wanda Waddleton	Acclaimed	
Colin Cheater	Acclaimed	
Sharon Topping	Acclaimed	
Reg Seaward	Acclaimed	
Riley Pennell	Acclaimed	
Rita Pennell	Acclaimed	

== Trinity ==
=== Town Council ===
Candidates	Votes	%
Christian Hayter (X)	94	16.8%
Jonathan Johnson	90	16.1%
Elizabeth Currie	81	14.5%
Linda Sweet	77	13.8%
Amanda Mitchell	69	12.3%
Noel Miller	67	12%
Paul Stapleton (X)	46	8.2%
Kevin Ealey (X)	33	5.9%

== Trinity Bay North ==
=== Town Council ===
Candidates	Votes	%
Edmund Hogan	Acclaimed	
Albert Johnson (X)	Acclaimed	
Harvey Pye	Acclaimed	
Doreen Rumbolt (X)	Acclaimed	
Kevin Russell	Acclaimed	
Pauline Stagg (X)	Acclaimed	
Terence Stead (X)	Acclaimed	

== Triton ==
=== Town Council ===
Candidates	Votes	%
Doretta Strickland (X)	294	12.2%
Harris Roberts	277	11.5%
Jason Roberts (X)	250	10.3%
Pat Williams (X)	249	10.3%
Kevin Flynn	241	10%
Joseph Saulnier (X)	235	9.7%
Stedman Rideout (X)	234	9.7%
Larry Henstridge	223	9.2%
Lindy Vincent	214	8.8%
Lloyd Mayo	190	7.8%

== Trout River ==
=== Town Council ===
Candidates	Votes	%
Nelson B. Barnes (X)	Acclaimed	
Marsha Crocker (X)	Acclaimed	
Tina Crocker (X)	Acclaimed	
Roger Hann (X)	Acclaimed	
Marie Wilton	Acclaimed	
Tayna-Lee Rogers	Acclaimed	

== Twillingate ==
=== Town Council ===
Candidates	Votes	%
Danny Andrews (X)	Acclaimed	
Justin Blackler (X)	Acclaimed	
Deborah Bourden	Acclaimed	
Wayne Greenham (X)	Acclaimed	
Bobby Gorman	Acclaimed	
Mike Johnson (X)	Acclaimed	
Andrew Rowsell (X)	Acclaimed	

== Upper Island Cove ==
=== Mayor ===
Candidate	Votes	%
Cindy Dobbin (X)	Acclaimed	

=== Town Council ===
Candidates	Votes	%
Renee Crossman (X)	Acclaimed	
Chad Drover (X)	Acclaimed	
Kim Ford (X)	Acclaimed	
Sheryl Hussey	Acclaimed	
John Lynch (X)	Acclaimed	
Darren Mercer (X)	Acclaimed	

== Victoria ==
=== Mayor ===
Candidates	Votes	%
Frank E. Clarke	442	51.5%
Barry Dooley (X)	416	48.4%

=== Town Council ===
Candidates	Votes	%
Denise Baker-King	560	13.3%
David White Sr.	548	13%
Kelly Loch	513	12.2%
Shelley Dawe	431	10.2%
Jim Layden (X)	427	10.1%
Freeman Parsons	410	9.7%
David Clarke	401	9.5%
Arthur J. Kelloway (X)	324	7.7%
Melvin Baldwin	296	7%
Dion Penney (X)	294	6.9%

== Wabana ==
=== Mayor ===
Candidate	Votes	%
Phillip Tobin (X)	Acclaimed	

=== Town Council ===
Candidates	Votes	%
Lois Vokey	633	16.2%
Stephanie Marshall	499	12.8%
Raymond "Fox" Galway	491	12.5%
Dan MCisaac	455	11.6%
Bradley Gosine	448	11.4%
Janine Wallace	435	11.1%
Donald Kavanagh	384	10%
Henry Crane (X)	383	9.8%
David Rose	170	4.3%

== Wabush ==
=== Mayor ===
Candidate	Votes	%
Gertie Canning (X)	Acclaimed	

=== Town Council ===
Candidates	Votes	%
Jamie Shea	347	20.4%
Vanessa Temple	261	15.3%
Kelley Pafford	253	14.8%
Rita Pynn (X)	244	14.3%
Debbie Hawes	223	13.1%
Lora Brown	218	12.8%
Jacqueline Carre	152	8.9%

== West St. Modeste ==
=== Town Council ===
Candidates	Votes	%
Agnes Pike (X)	61	20.4%
Marie Marshall	46	15.3%
Walter Bolger (X)	40	13.3%
Barbara Tracey (X)	39	13%
Marius Pike	36	12%
Claudia Pike	33	11%
Suzette Marshall (X)	26	8.6%
Neal Pike (X)	18	6%

== Westport ==
=== Town Council ===
Candidates	Votes	%
William Wheeler	90	21.8%
Margaret Jacobs	82	19.9%
Kimberley Jacobs	65	15.8%
Lera Jacobs-Ricketts	45	10.9%
Cindy Pittman	45	10.9%
Pauline Warren (X)	39	9.4%
Julia Warren	25	6%
Marcus King (X)	20	4.8%

== Whitbourne ==
=== Mayor ===
Candidate	Votes	%
Hilda Whelan (X)	Acclaimed	

=== Town Council ===
Candidates	Votes	%
Mitchel Larner	226	15.9%
Thomas Howe (X)	212	14.9%
Gladys Smith	208	14.6%
Wayne Noseworthy	204	14.3%
Terry Gillam (X)	176	12.4%
Edward Durnford	167	11.7%
Harry Brazil	137	9.6%
Douglas Corcoran	87	6.1%

== Whiteway ==
=== Town Council ===
Candidates	Votes	%
Albert Legge (X)	118	14.9%
Karla Harnum	113	14.3%
Jo-lynn Jackson (X)	104	13.1%
Robert George (X)	99	12.5%
Stacey Mahoney (X)	95	12%
Jason Harnum	92	11.6%
Barbara George (X)	91	11.5%
John Drover (X)	78	9.8%

== Winterland ==
=== Town Council ===
Candidates	Votes	%
Frank Collins (X)	Acclaimed	
Allan Dodge (X)	Acclaimed	
Lesleeanne Keating (X)	Acclaimed	
David Pittman (X)	Acclaimed	
Kim Stapleton (X)	Acclaimed	

== Winterton ==
=== Town Council ===
Candidates	Votes	%
Lily Webber	190	17.4%
Lloyd Hindy	167	15.3%
Lori Hiscock (X)	128	11.7%
David Reid (X)	124	11.3%
Stephen Thomas (X)	108	9.9%
Andrew Green	102	9.3%
Mark Sheppard (X)	94	8.6%
Gary Hiscock (X)	91	8.3%
Cory Tizzard	85	7.8%

== Witless Bay ==
=== Town Council ===
Candidates	Votes	%
Susan Byrne	Acclaimed	
Ralph Carey (X)	Acclaimed	
Gerard Dunne (X)	Acclaimed	
Jacob Hayden (X)	Acclaimed	
Justina Nawaz (X)	Acclaimed	
Margaret Swain (X)	Acclaimed	
Robert Thor	Acclaimed	

== Woodstock ==
=== Town Council ===
Candidates	Votes	%
Tonya Bath (X)	Acclaimed	
Deanna Decker (X)	Acclaimed	
Ivy Mitchell (X)	Acclaimed	
Trudy Randell (X)	Acclaimed	
Kirk Simms (X)	Acclaimed	

== Woody Point ==
=== Town Council ===
Candidates	Votes	%
Roger Coates (X)	Acclaimed	
Tom Cochrane	Acclaimed	
John Gillam (X)	Acclaimed	
Irene Martin (X)	Acclaimed	
Carol Ann Wilton (X)	Acclaimed	
Joey Young	Acclaimed	
Terry Young (X)	Acclaimed	

== York Harbour ==
=== Town Council ===
Candidates	Votes	%
Michael Kendell	Acclaimed	
Kyle Burry	Acclaimed	
Roxanne Sheppard	Acclaimed	
Raymond McCarthy	Acclaimed	
Tracey Childs	Acclaimed	

== See also ==
- 2025 Canadian electoral calendar
- Municipal elections in Canada
