= Newfoundland and Labrador Route 382 =

Highway in Newfoundland and Labrador, Canada

Route 382
- Long Island Tickle Road

Route information
- Maintained by Newfoundland and Labrador Department of Transportation and Infrastructure
- Length: 7.8 km (4.8 mi)

Major junctions
- East end: Route 380 at Pilley's Island
- West end: Long Island ferry dock

Location
- Country: Canada
- Province: Newfoundland and Labrador

Highway system
- Highways in Newfoundland and Labrador
| ← Route 381 | → Route 390 |

Route 382, also known as Long Island Tickle Road, is a highway in the central portion of Newfoundland in the Canadian province of Newfoundland and Labrador, branching off Route 380 (Beothuck Trail) in the town of Pilley's Island. The route is the only provincial route with no communities prevalent – it is designed as an access to the Lushes Bight–Beaumont–Beaumont North (Long Island) ferry. The maximum speed limit for much of Route 382 is 60 km/h, but is reduced to 30 km/h when approaching the ferry.

== Major intersections ==
| Location | km | mi | Destinations | Notes |
|---|---|---|---|---|
| Pilley's Island | 0.0 | 0.0 | Route 380 (Beothuck Trail) to Route 1 (TCH) – Triton, Robert's Arm, South Brook | Southern terminus |
| | 7.8 | 4.8 | Long Island Ferry dock | Northern terminus |
1.000 mi = 1.609 km; 1.000 km = 0.621 mi
