= Newfoundland and Labrador Route 380 =

Highway in Newfoundland and Labrador, Canada

Route 380
- Beothuck Trail

Route information
- Maintained by Newfoundland and Labrador Department of Transportation and Infrastructure
- Length: 53.7 km (33.4 mi)

Major junctions
- South end: Route 1 (TCH) in South Brook
- Route 381 in Robert's Arm; Route 382 in Pilley's Island
- North end: Brighton

Location
- Country: Canada
- Province: Newfoundland and Labrador

Highway system
- Highways in Newfoundland and Labrador
← Route 371	→ Route 381

Route 380 (also known as the Beothuck Trail) is a highway in Newfoundland and Labrador. There are five communities along the route, beginning with South Brook at the Trans-Canada Highway (Route 1), and ending at the community of Brighton. The route travels through three islands, including Pilley's Island and Brighton Tickle Island. Triton is the most populous community along the route.

== Route description ==
Route 380 begins on mainland Newfoundland in South Brook at an intersection with Route 1 (TCH) and heads north through town before leaving and heading northeast through very hilly terrain for several kilometres, where it has an intersection with Route 381 (Port Anson Road), which provides access to the communities on Sunday Cove Island. The highway now passes through Roberts Arm before crossing a Causeway onto Pilley's Island and passing through the Town of the same name, where it has an intersection with Route 382 (Long Island Tickle Road), which provides access to a ferry leading to Lushes Bight–Beaumont–Beaumont North (Long Island). Route 380 now crosses another causeway onto Big Triton Island and winds its way through the town of Triton before heading through hilly terrain to cross the final causeway onto Brighton Tickle Island, where it comes to an end in downtown Brighton.

== Major intersections ==
Location	km	mi	Destinations	Notes
South Brook	0.0	0.0	Route 1 (TCH) – Grand Falls-Windsor, Deer Lake	Southern terminus
Robert's Arm	21.0	13.0	Route 381 north (Port Anson Road) – Port Anson, Miles Cove	Southern terminus of Route 381
Pilley's Island	33.7	20.9	Route 382 north (Long Island Tickle Road) – Lushes Bight, Beaumont	Southern terminus of Route 382; provides access to Long Island ferry
Brighton	53.7	33.4	Dead End	Northern terminus
1.000 mi = 1.609 km; 1.000 km = 0.621 mi
