= Newfoundland and Labrador Route 381 =

Highway in Newfoundland and Labrador, Canada

Route 381
- Port Anson Road

Route information
- Maintained by Newfoundland and Labrador Department of Transportation and Infrastructure
- Length: 15.3 km (9.5 mi)

Major junctions
- South end: Route 380 in Roberts Arm
- North end: Miles Cove

Location
- Country: Canada
- Province: Newfoundland and Labrador

Highway system
- Highways in Newfoundland and Labrador
← Route 380	→ Route 382

Route 381, also known as Port Anson Road, is a 15.3-kilometre-long (9.5 mi) north–south highway in northern Newfoundland in the Canadian province of Newfoundland and Labrador. It serves as the only road connection to the communities on Sunday Cove Island.

== Route description ==
Route 381 begins on mainland Newfoundland at an intersection with Route 380 (Beothuck Trail) at the westernmost edge of Roberts Arm. It heads northwest through rural hilly terrain for a few kilometres before crossing a Causeway over a channel onto Sunday Cove Island. The highway now curves to the east and winds its way along the island to pass through Port Anson before coming to an end in Miles Cove near the harbour. As with most highways in Newfoundland and Labrador, the entire length of Route 381 is entirely a two-lane highway.

== Major intersections ==
Location	km	mi	Destinations	Notes
Robert's Arm	0.0	0.0	Route 380 (Beothuck Trail) to Route 1 (TCH) – South Brook, Pilley's Island, Triton	Southern terminus
Miles Cove	15.3	9.5	Oceanview Road	Northern terminus
1.000 mi = 1.609 km; 1.000 km = 0.621 mi
