= Brighton, Newfoundland and Labrador =

Brighton
- Town
- Location of Brighton in Newfoundland
- Coordinates: 49°32′53.56″N 55°38′15.17″W
- Country: Canada
- Province: Newfoundland and Labrador

Government
  - Mayor: Stewart Fillier

Area
  - Land: 2.23 km^{2} (0.86 sq mi)

Population (2021)
  - Total: 163
  - Density: 84.3/km^{2} (218/sq mi)
- Time zone: UTC-3:30 (Newfoundland Time)
  - Summer (DST): UTC-2:30 (Newfoundland Daylight)
- Area code: 709
- Highways: Route 380

Brighton is a town in the Canadian province of Newfoundland and Labrador.

== Demographics ==
In the 2021 Census of Population conducted by Statistics Canada, Brighton had a population of 163 living in 71 of its 97 total private dwellings, a change of −13.3% from its 2016 population of 188. With a land area of 2.26 km^{2} (0.87 sq mi), it had a population density of 72.1/km^{2} (186.8/sq mi) in 2021.

== See also ==
- List of cities and towns in Newfoundland and Labrador
