= Pilley's Island =

- Town
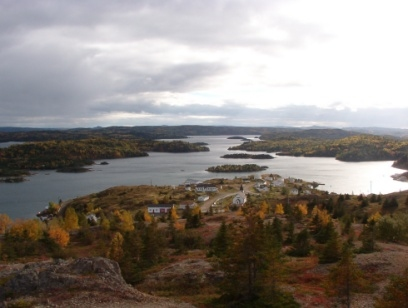

- Location of Pilley's Island in Newfoundland
- Coordinates: 49°30′N 55°43′W
- Country: Canada
- Province: Newfoundland and Labrador
- Census division: 8
- Settled: 1887

Population (2021)
  - Total: 286
- Time zone: UTC-3:30 (Newfoundland Time)
  - Summer (DST): UTC-2:30 (Newfoundland Daylight)
- Area code: 709
- Highways: Route 380; Route 382; Ferry to Long Island

Pilley's Island is a town located on the island of the same name in the Canadian province of Newfoundland and Labrador. It is located in Division No. 8, Newfoundland and Labrador.

== History ==
The island is known to have been frequented by the Dorset and the Beothuk.

In 1880, James P. Howley "obtained possession of the mummified body of a Red Indian boy, found in Dark Tickle near Pilley’s Island" from a Jabez Tilley of Sops Arm; the body was exhibited in St. John's and then donated to the St. John’s Museum.

Distant from the best fishing grounds further out the Bay, no settlement was recorded at Pilley's Island until the opening of a pyrite mine in 1887. Some early boat-building had taken place at Spencer's Dock, to the west of Pilley's Island Harbour. The island is thought to have been named for one of the seasonal visitors. While some have been known to spell it as "Pelley's Island", this is incorrect.

Local tradition says that Richard Rideout was the first European settler at Pilley’s Island. Rideout is buried in the Pilley’s Island Salvation Army Cemetery, and his grave marker reads, “Richard RIDEOUT beloved husband of Eliza RIDEOUT died Aug. 25, 1928 aged 88 years.” This is supported by Seary’s Family Names of the Island of Newfoundland which states “Richard (1840-1928), from England, came to Newfoundland in 1870 and was the first settler of PIlley’s Island.” The earliest families on Pilley's Island came from Twillingate, Change Islands and Herring Neck. Some of these families had earlier come to the western part of the Bay to work a copper mine at Tilt Cove.

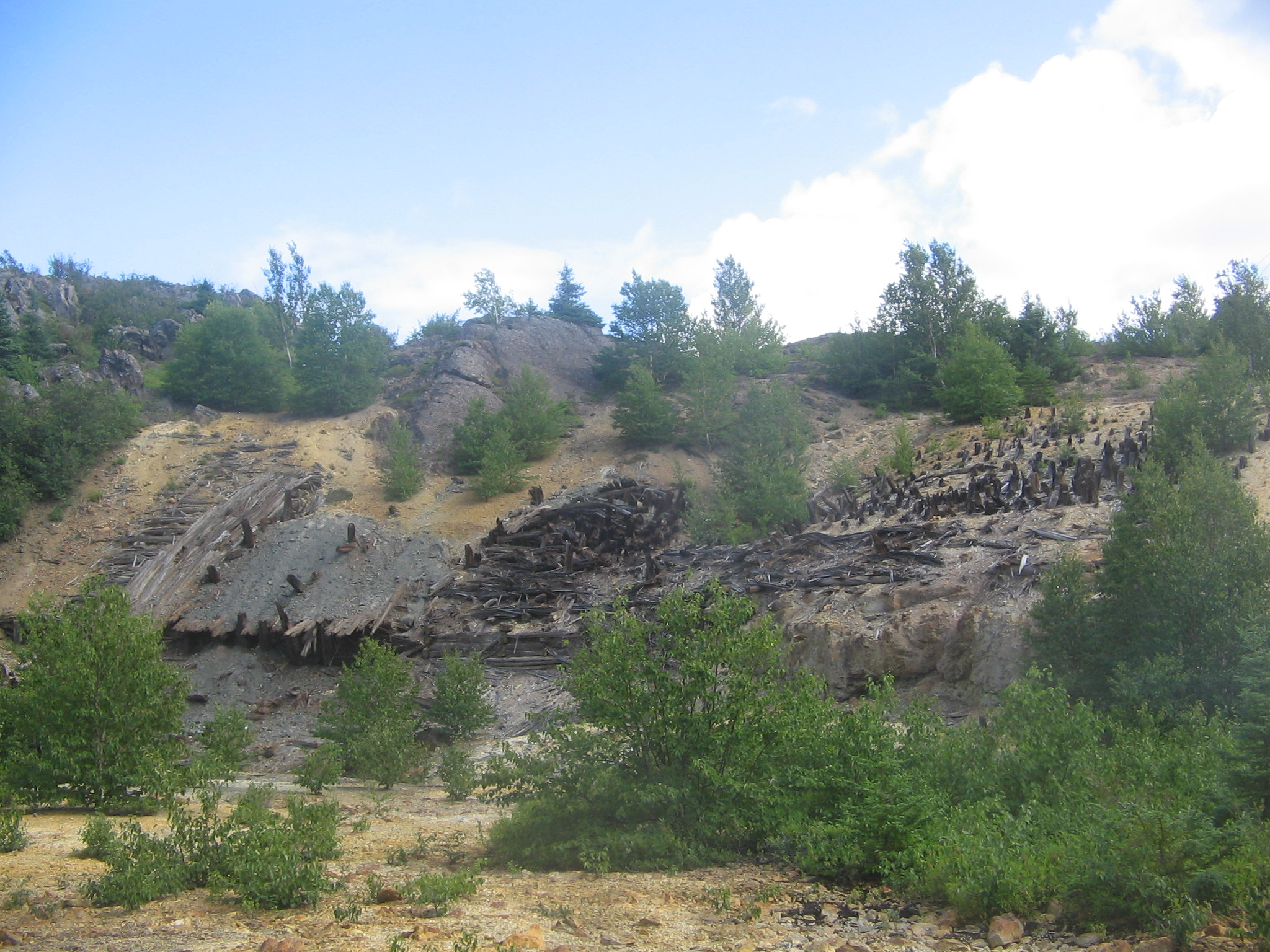
Pilley's Island mine in summer 2012

In the 1860s, Captain Philip Cleary staked a mineral claim at Bumblebee Bight, hoping to develop a copper mine, though the island's orebody was chiefly pyrite. In 1885, Maine and Lewis Mills of New Brunswick bought the claim and the next year the company began mining. Tradition says that prior to the opening of the mine there were at least two families living on the island; however, church records have no record of births, deaths or marriages at Pilley's Island until 1887. By 1891, when the mine was in full production, the population was 411.

In 1889, the mine was acquired by the Pyrites Company Ltd. of England. Under new management, the mine was modernized, becoming the first Newfoundland mine to be equipped with electric lights, among other improvements. With the mine's prosperity, the community developed into the area's major employment and service center, with a hotel, courthouse, six merchant establishments, and the area's only hospital, set up by Sir Wilfred Grenfell.

In 1891 it was reported,

The Pilley’s Island mine has recently been taken over by a new company, and will be worked more extensively than ever during this season. The ore which it yields, iron pyrites, is more abundant than formerly and preparations are being made for larger shipments this year.

Forest fires in 1896 destroyed the Court House, the Methodist Church and the Salvation Army Barracks; thirty-five families were rendered homeless.

In 1899, the mine went into trusteeship. Three years later, it was reopened by the Newfoundland Exploration Syndicate. The mine closed permanently in 1908 when it was discovered that a large fault had displaced the main ore body. Though the community lost its major employer, the town survived as a fishing and lumbering community. Its population, which was 699 in 1901, declined to 405 by 1945.

The first clergyman to serve Pilley's Island was Methodist James Pincock and, following the fires of 1896, the Methodists built their second church. Later the Salvation Army, Church of England and Roman Catholic Church built churches. After the mine closed, the Church of England disappeared and only a few Roman Catholics remained. The Methodist and Roman Catholic churches operated schools, and after 1903 the Salvation Army also operated one. The United Church and Salvation Army continued to operate separate schools until 1960. In 1967, high school students began to attend the Integrated Central High School at Roberts Arm. In 1977, Dorset Collegiate was opened on Pilley's Island, near the causeway to Triton.

In addition to the causeway across Flat Rock Tickle to the mainland, a second causeway has connected Pilley's and Triton Island since 1968. A port in Pilley's Island services the isolated outport of Long Island (Lushes Bight-Beaumont-Beaumont North).

In 2022, a plaque marking the designation of the Pilley's Island Methodist Church and Schoolhouse Complex as a Registered Heritage Structure was unveiled by the Heritage Foundation of Newfoundland and Labrador.

== Demographics ==
In the 2021 Census of Population conducted by Statistics Canada, Pilley's Island had a population of 286 living in 135 of its 186 total private dwellings, a change of −2.7% from its 2016 population of 294. With a land area of 34.65 km^{2} (13.38 sq mi), it had a population density of 8.3/km^{2} (21.4/sq mi) in 2021.

== See also ==
- List of cities and towns in Newfoundland and Labrador
- Springdale, Newfoundland and Labrador
- Triton, Newfoundland and Labrador
