= Port Anson =

Coordinates: 49.540°N 55.833°W

- Town
- Interactive map of Port Anson
- Country: Canada
- Province: Newfoundland and Labrador

Population (2021)
  - Total: 110
- Time zone: UTC-3:30 (Newfoundland Time)
  - Summer (DST): UTC-2:30 (Newfoundland Daylight)
- Area code: 709
- Highways: Route 381

Port Anson is a town on Sunday Cove Island in the Canadian province of Newfoundland and Labrador. The town had a population of 110 in 2021, down from 155 in the Canada 2006 Census.

== Demographics ==
In the 2021 Census of Population conducted by Statistics Canada, Port Anson had a population of 110 living in 23 of its 72 total private dwellings, a change of −15.4% from its 2016 population of 130. With a land area of 7.72 km^{2} (2.98 sq mi), it had a population density of 5.4/km^{2} (14.1/sq mi) in 2021.

== See also ==
- List of cities and towns in Newfoundland and Labrador
