= Roberts Arm =

Roberts Arm Rabbits Arm
- Town
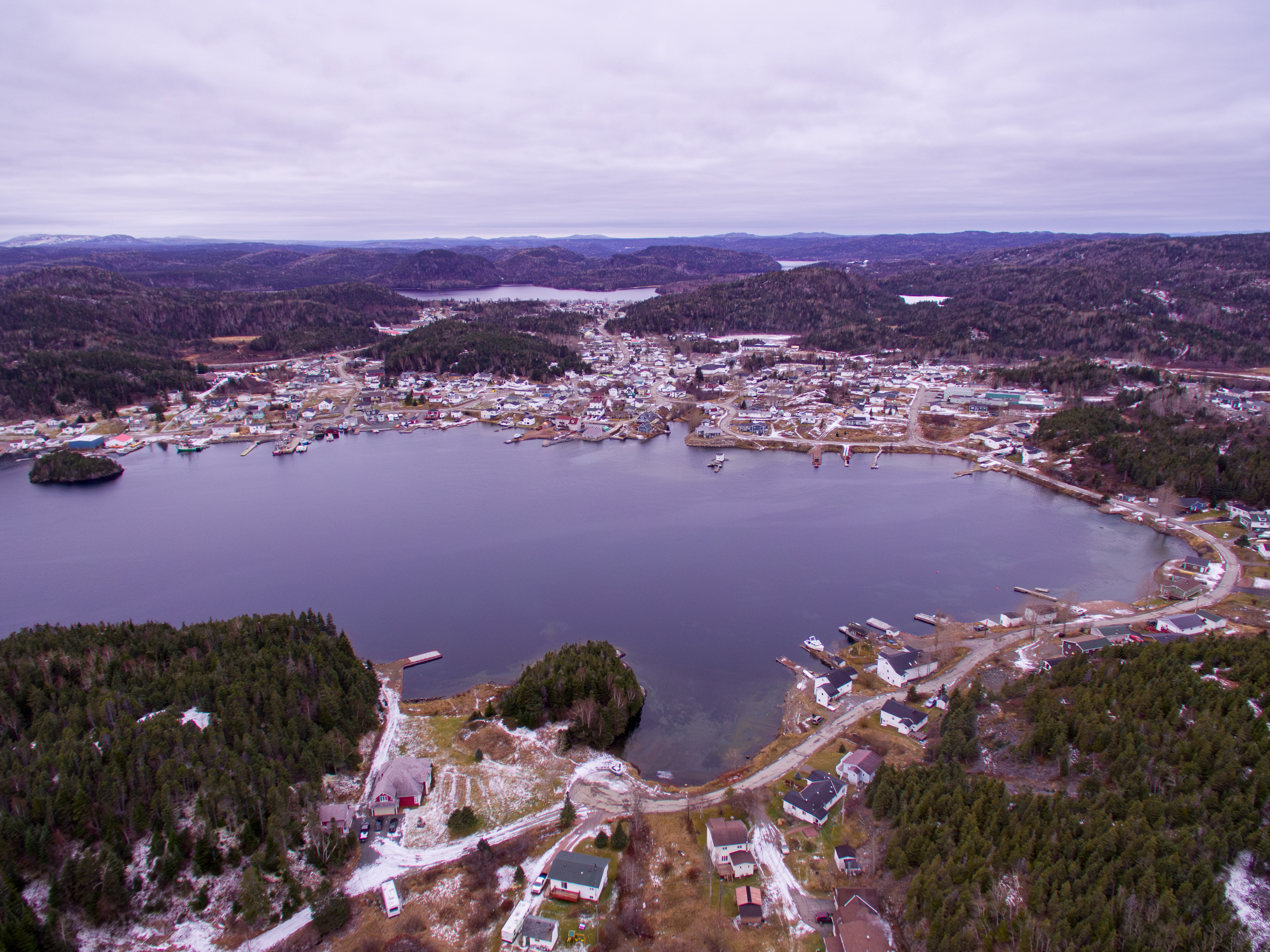

- Location of Roberts Arm in Newfoundland
- Coordinates: 49°29′17″N 55°48′39″W
- Country: Canada
- Province: Newfoundland and Labrador
- Census division: 8
- Established: 1885

Government

Population (2021)
  - Total: 722
- Time zone: UTC-3:30 (Newfoundland Time)
  - Summer (DST): UTC-2:30 (Newfoundland Daylight)
- Canadian Postal code: A0J 1R0
- Area code: 709
- Highways: Route 380; Route 381
- Website: www.facebook.com/Roberts.Arm

Roberts Arm is a small town located near Crescent Lake, Newfoundland and Labrador, Canada in Division No. 8, Newfoundland and Labrador. It is found on the northern part of Newfoundland. Roberts Arm boasts of its Lake Monster, Cressie, which is claimed to be living in Crescent Lake. Recent years saw the development of a hiking trail which encompasses the end of the lake nearest to the community, Hazelnut Adventure Trail.

== History ==
Up until the early 20th century Roberts Arm was known as Rabbits Arm, due to a large presence of snowshoe hare in the area. The town is supposedly named after John Roberts, an influential landowner in the area. Logging was the main source of revenue for the town. In 1937, Bowater began operations in Roberts Arm, which led to a significant population increase.

The Roberts Arm strike occurred due to low wages and poor camp conditions. Bowater workers were being paid $2.00 per cord, compared to other areas in Newfoundland and Labrador where workers were paid $2.50 per chord. The strike ended when Sir Eric Bowater threatened to cease operations in Roberts Arm, those on strike returned to work afterwards for the same pay.

== Demographics ==
In the 2021 Census of Population conducted by Statistics Canada, Robert's Arm had a population of 722 living in 351 of its 385 total private dwellings, a change of −10.3% from its 2016 population of 805. With a land area of 36.09 km^{2} (13.93 sq mi), it had a population density of 20.0/km^{2} (51.8/sq mi) in 2021.

== See also ==
- List of cities and towns in Newfoundland and Labrador
