= Miles Cove =

- Town
- Interactive map of Miles Cove
- Coordinates: 49°32′25″N 55°47′45″W
- Country: Canada
- Province: Newfoundland and Labrador

Population (2021)
  - Total: 97
- Time zone: UTC-3:30 (Newfoundland Time)
  - Summer (DST): UTC-2:30 (Newfoundland Daylight)
- Area code: 709
- Highways: Route 381

Miles Cove is a town on Sunday Cove Island in the Canadian province of Newfoundland and Labrador. The town had a population of 104 in 2016, down from 140 in the Canada 2006 Census.

== Demographics ==
In the 2021 Census of Population conducted by Statistics Canada, Miles Cove had a population of 97 living in 48 of its 65 total private dwellings, a change of −6.7% from its 2016 population of 104. With a land area of 3.98 km^{2} (1.54 sq mi), it had a population density of 24.4/km^{2} (63.1/sq mi) in 2021.

== See also ==
- List of cities and towns in Newfoundland and Labrador
