= South Brook, Newfoundland and Labrador =

South Brook
- Town
- Interactive map of South Brook
- Coordinates: 49°24′11″N 56°05′23″W
- Country: Canada
- Province: Newfoundland and Labrador

Population (2021)
  - Total: 420
- Time zone: UTC-3:30 (Newfoundland Time)
  - Summer (DST): UTC-2:30 (Newfoundland Daylight)
- Postal code: A0J 1S0
- Area code: 709
- Highways: Route 1 (TCH); Route 380

South Brook is a town in the Canadian province of Newfoundland and Labrador. It is located in the center region of the island of Newfoundland. The town had a population of 420 in 2021, down from 482 in the Canada 2016 Census.

South Brook was not listed as a community until the 1940s, although history documents suggest it may have been in existence as a winter community as early as 70 years prior.

South Brook has historically had a strong logging industry and at one time there was also a rabbit-canning factory in town.

The area is rich in Beothuk and Mi'kmaq history and artifacts have been recovered by local residents which only solidify this history. Rowsell's Hill, a prominent hill which rises as a backdrop to the town, was named for an early settler who died to the Indian band at the time. He is known to have caused much trouble for them because of his dislike for natives and this led to his death.

Kona Beach Park is located in South Brook.

== Demographics ==
In the 2021 Census of Population conducted by Statistics Canada, South Brook had a population of 420 living in 202 of its 243 total private dwellings, a change of −12.9% from its 2016 population of 482. With a land area of 8.72 km^{2} (3.37 sq mi), it had a population density of 48.2/km^{2} (124.7/sq mi) in 2021.

== See also ==
- List of cities and towns in Newfoundland and Labrador
