= Triton, Newfoundland and Labrador =

Triton
- Town
- Interactive map of Triton
- Coordinates: 49°31′06″N 55°37′12″W
- Country: Canada
- Province: Newfoundland and Labrador

Government
  - Mayor: Jason Roberts

Population (2021)
  - Total: 896
- Time zone: UTC-3:30 (Newfoundland Time)
  - Summer (DST): UTC-2:30 (Newfoundland Daylight)
- Postal code: A0J 1V0
- Area code: 709
- Highways: Route 380
- Website: www.townoftriton.ca

Triton is a town that lies on Triton Island just off the coast of northeastern Newfoundland, in the Canadian province of Newfoundland and Labrador. According to Statistics Canada, Triton's population fell from 983 in 2016 to 896 in 2021.

The town of Triton has seen new businesses and buildings opening in 2017. Triton also has a swimming pool, skatepark and a small basketball court; there are also trailer campsites near the community.

== History ==
In the earliest days of settlement, ties were strong with Twillingate, where fishermen traded cod. In the 1890s, the first stores were kept by families at Little Triton Harbour as agents of merchants at Little Bay Islands. A business was established at Great Triton Harbour which supplied many fishermen in the area and became involved in supplying schooners for the Labrador fishery. With a strong inshore fishery, a growing involvement in the fishery in Labrador and winter logging for lumber and pulp and paper industries, the population of Triton grew considerably to 470 in 1935 and 625 in 1951. Triton East and West incorporated in 1955 and Jim's Cove and Card's Harbour incorporated in 1958. In 1961, the two municipalities amalgamated as a rural district.

After the causeway was built in 1968, linking the island to Pilley's Island and the mainland, the community continued to grow. Because of the increasing dependency on the road, it was the end for Little Triton, which was declining in population. Since it was not on the road, it was soon abandoned. In 1980, a new fish plant, Triton Seafoods, was opened at Little Triton Harbour, and a road was built to it. In the same year, the rural district was re-incorporated as the town of Triton.

== Demographics ==
In the 2021 Census of Population conducted by Statistics Canada, Triton had a population of 896 living in 390 of its 457 total private dwellings, a change of −8.9% from its 2016 population of 983. With a land area of 7.54 km^{2} (2.91 sq mi), it had a population density of 118.8/km^{2} (307.8/sq mi) in 2021.

== Notable people ==
- Natasha Henstridge (born 1974), actress and former model

== See also ==
- List of cities and towns in Newfoundland and Labrador
- Springdale, Newfoundland and Labrador
