= Lushes Bight-Beaumont-Beaumont North =

Lushes Bight–Beaumont–Beaumont North
- Town
- Location of Lushes Bight–Beaumont–Beaumont North in Newfoundland
- Coordinates: 49°36′45″N 55°41′57″W
- Country: Canada
- Province: Newfoundland and Labrador

Population (2021)
  - Total: 169
- Time zone: UTC-3:30 (Newfoundland Time)
  - Summer (DST): UTC-2:30 (Newfoundland Daylight)
- Area code: 709
- Highways: Ferry to Pilley's Island

Lushes Bight–Beaumont–Beaumont North is a town on Long Island in Notre Dame Bay in the Canadian province of Newfoundland and Labrador. The town had a population of 169 at the 2021 Census, down from 275 in the 2006 Census.

The community is inaccessible by road and is serviced by a ferry via Pilley's Island.

The local school, Long Island Academy, closed in 2016.

== Demographics ==
In the 2021 Census of Population conducted by Statistics Canada, Lushes Bight-Beaumont-Beaumont North had a population of 169 living in 96 of its 150 total private dwellings, a change of 0.6% from its 2016 population of 168. With a land area of 34.52 km^{2} (13.33 sq mi), it had a population density of 4.9/km^{2} (12.7/sq mi) in 2021.

== See also ==
- List of cities and towns in Newfoundland and Labrador
- Newfoundland outport
