= List of islands of Newfoundland and Labrador =

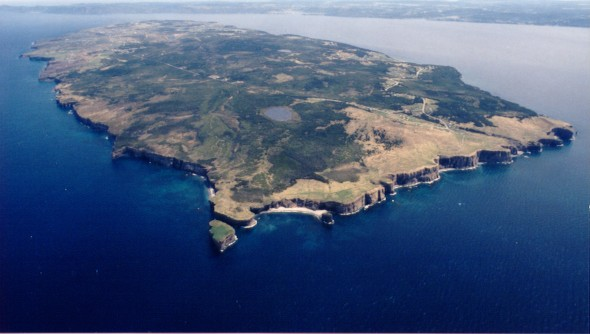
Bell Island

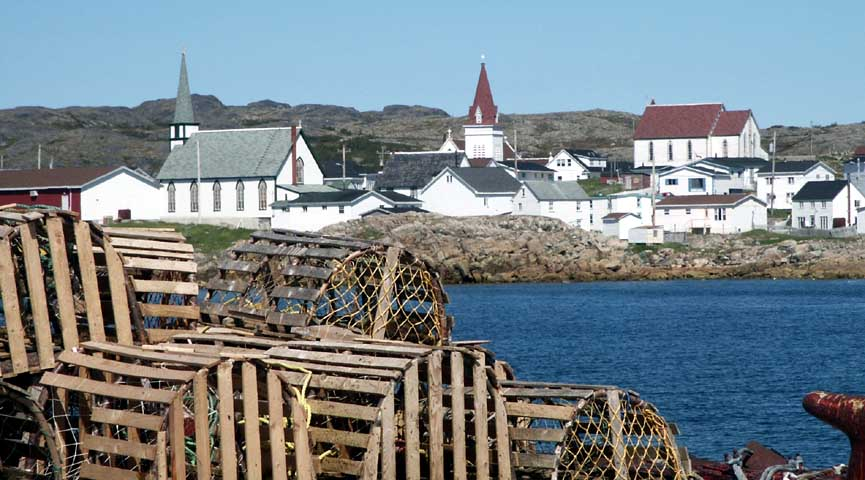
Village on Fogo Island

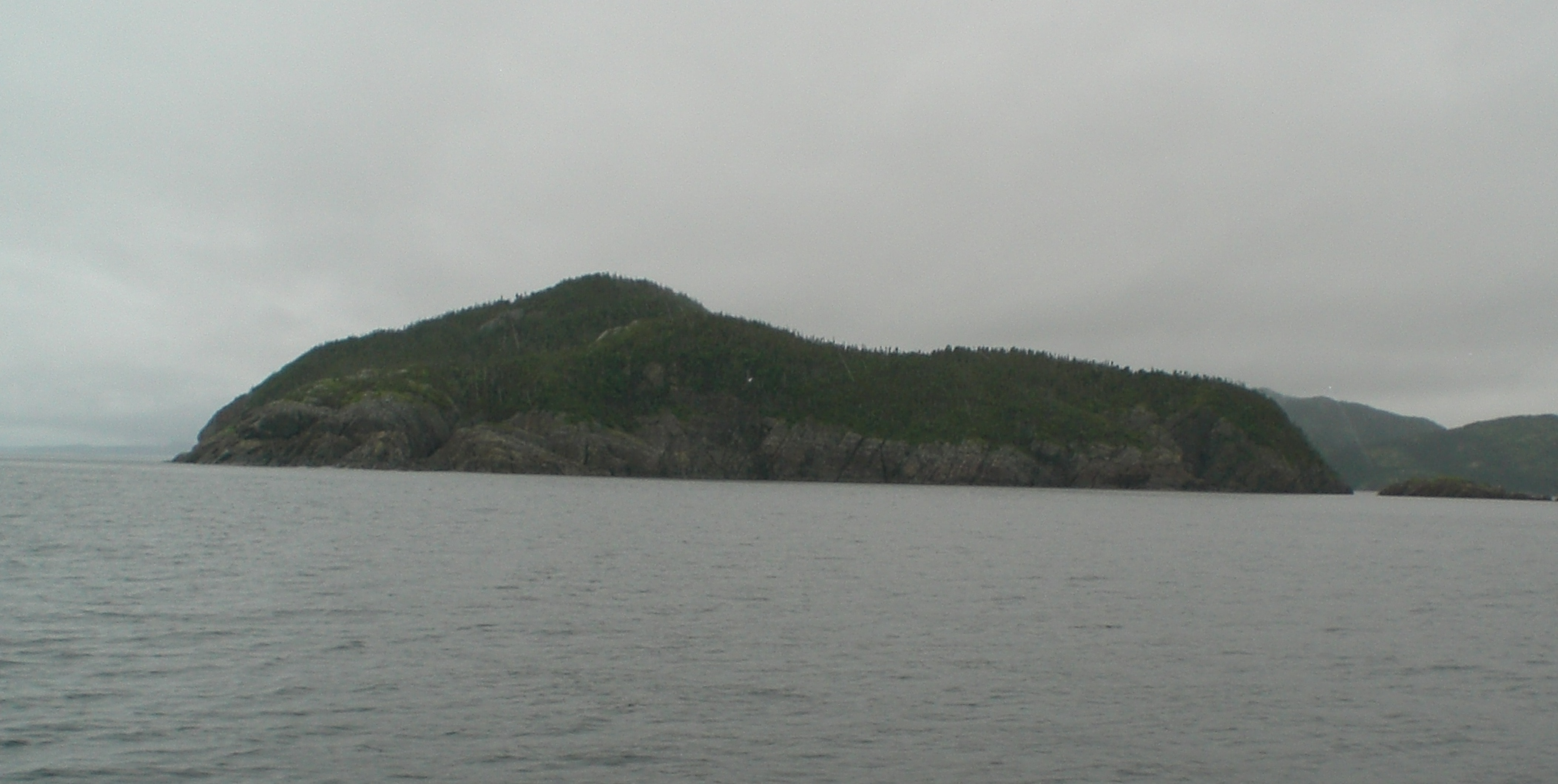
Keats Island

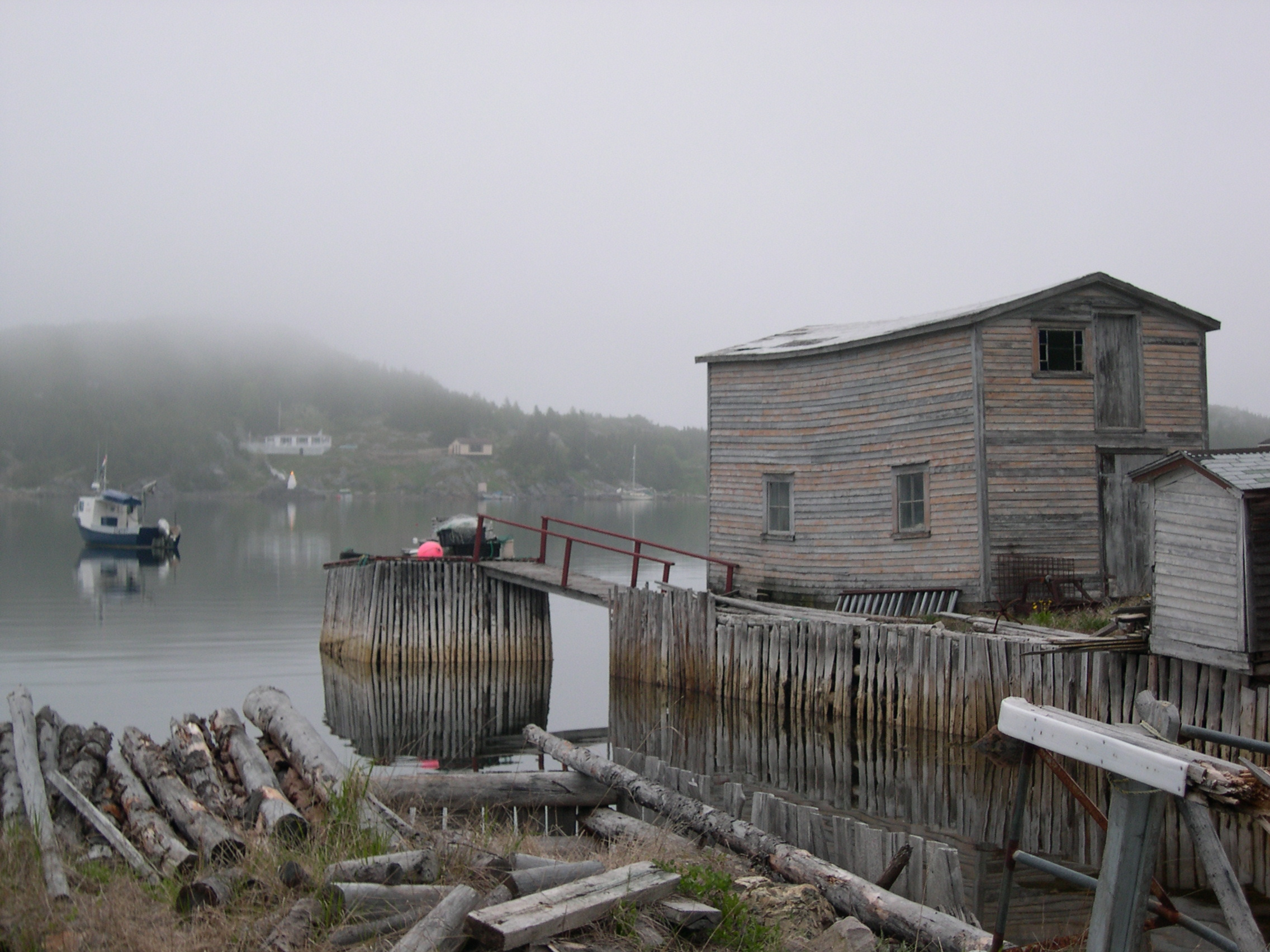
Dock on Little Bay Islands

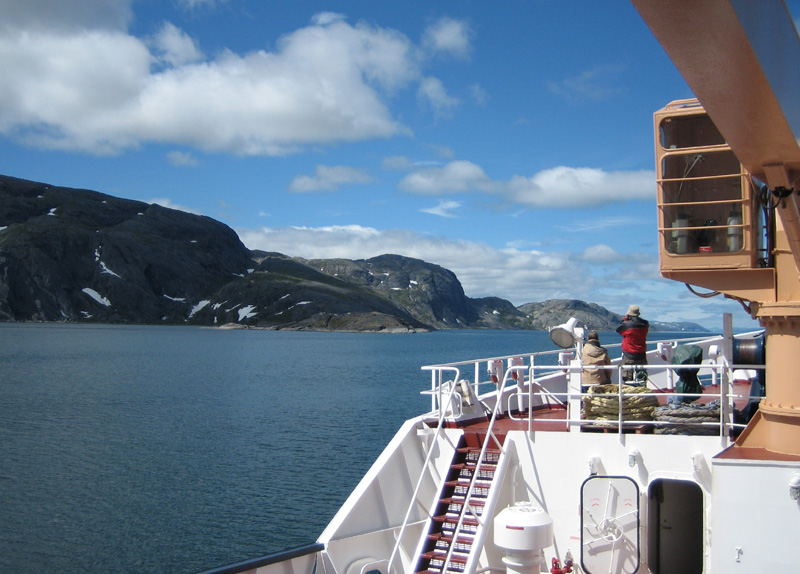
Coast of Paul's Island

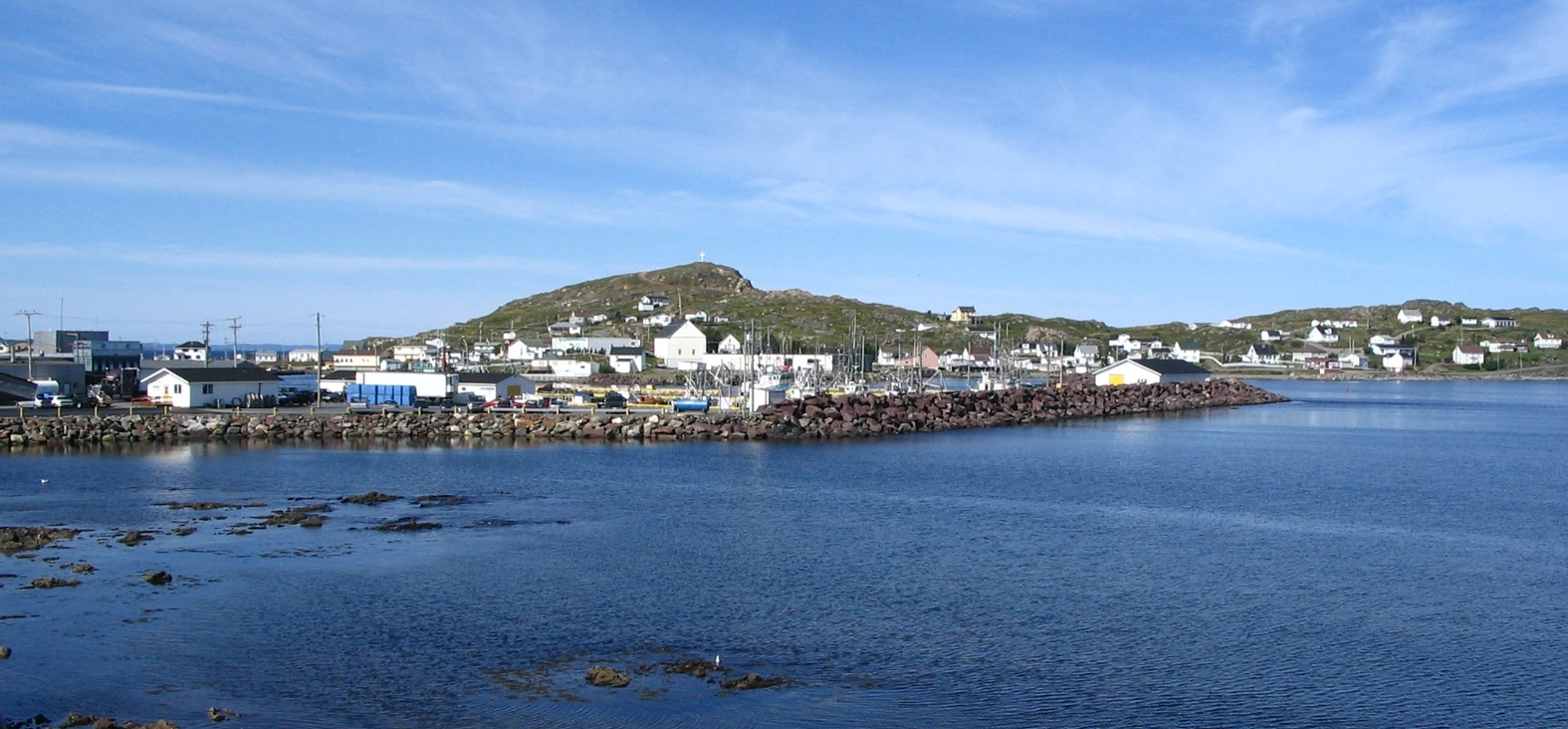
Twillingate

The Canadian province of Newfoundland and Labrador is composed of mainland Labrador and the large island of Newfoundland. The coast of both the island and the Labrador Peninsula are lined with islands of various magnitudes.

== List ==
Name	Water body	Area km^{2}	Location	Remarks
Allan's Island	Atlantic Ocean		46°51′2.8″N 55°48′9.7″W	Part of the town of Lamaline
Baccalieu	Conception Bay	5	48.13028°N 52.80139°W	Uninhabited
Balcalhoa	Notre Dame Bay	2.2	49.69369°N 54.54646°W	Lighthouse
Bell	Conception Bay	34	47.650°N 52.933°W	Includes town of Wabana
Bell	Atlantic Ocean	88	50.733°N 55.567°W	One of the Grey Islands
Belle Isle	Strait of Belle Isle	52	51.92889°N 55.35917°W	Uninhabited
Brunette	Fortune Bay	20	47.27972°N 55.90056°W	Uninhabited
Bull, Cow and Calf	Atlantic Ocean		46.77583°N 54.09889°W	Avalon Peninsula island cluster
Carbonear	Conception Bay	0.3	47.73750°N 53.16694°W	Uninhabited
Change	Notre Dame Bay	24.4	49.67194°N 54.40790°W	Consists of South and North Island
Cod	Labrador Sea	132.71	57.783455°N 61.782345°W	Uninhabited
Dildo	Trinity Bay	0.9	47.56639°N 53.59083°W	
Fogo	Notre Dame Bay	254	49.667°N 54.167°W	Population in 2006: 2,706
Funk	Labrador Sea	0.024	49.75194°N 53.19222°W	
Gannet	Labrador Sea	2	53.934°N 56.505°W	Ecological reserve
Glover	Grand Lake	190	48.79694°N 57.65806°W	18th-largest lake island in the world by area
Granby	White Bay	0.5	52.5716406°N 55.7677249°W	Uninhabited
Green (Catalina)	Atlantic Ocean	0.6	48.5047°N 53.0460°W	East of Bonavista Peninsula
Green (Fortune)	Fortune Bay	0.3	46.883°N 56.083°W	West of Burin Peninsula
Greenspond	Bonavista Bay, North	2.85	49.07°N 53.57°W	Population: 257 (2021)
Groais	Atlantic Ocean	41	50.933°N 55.600°W	One of the Grey Islands
Hawke Island	Labrador Sea	56	53.05°N 55.83°W	Former whaling station
Home	Labrador Sea	12	60.17444°N 64.27111°W	
Horse	Atlantic Ocean	25	50.21028°N 55.74944°W	North of Baie Verte Peninsula
Horse Chops	Labrador Sea	5.9	53.86°N 57.04°W	
Hunt's Island	south west coast		47.5994445°N 57.6113889°W	Uninhabited
Island of Ponds	Labrador Sea	91	53.46°N 55.89°W	Includes settlement of Black Tickle
Keats	Bonavista Bay	0.7	48.65278°N 53.64722°W	Uninhabited
Kelly's	Conception Bay	1.9	47.54417°N 53.01139°W	Uninhabited
Killiniq	Ungava Bay	24	60.367°N 64.617°W	land border between Nunavut and Newfoundland (Newfoundland side)
Landsat	Labrador Sea	0.001	60.17694°N 64.04167°W	Discovered using Landsat 1 satellite imagery; forms easternmost part of Canada; uninhabited
Little Bay	Notre Dame Bay	7.1	49.64477°N 55.79853°W	
Long Island	Hermitage Bay	100	47.64583°N 55.98167°W	Includes town of Gaultois. Population in 2021: 100
Merasheen	Placentia Bay		47.5°N 54.25°W	
Millers	White Bay	0.1	49.558875°N 56.853083°W	Uninhabited
New World	Notre Dame Bay		49.57614°N 56.8617406°E	Includes the towns of Newville, Carter's Cove and Pike's Arm
Newfoundland	Atlantic Ocean	111,390	49°N 56°W	Most populous part of Newfoundland and Labrador
Newfoundland	Labrador Sea		53.85°N 56.94°W	A small island near Sandwich Bay
North Star	Labrador Sea	1	60.36722°N 64.40361°W	The province's northernmost island, off the Labrador coast
Nunaksaluk Island	Labrador Sea		55.8°N 60.3°W	Island off the Labrador coast
Oderin	Placentia Bay	1.7	47.29322°N 54.80444°W	
Old Perlican	Trinity Bay		48.08667°N 53.02167°W	
Paul's	Labrador Sea		56.517°N 61.500°W	Off the Labrador coast; source of the mineral labradorite
Pouch	Bonavista Bay	0.2	49.16601°N 53.47482°W	
Puffin	Conception Bay		48.1256694°N 52.8120417°W	
Pool's Island	Bonavista Bay, North	2.65	49.11°N 53.59°W	Population: 143 (2021)
Quirpon	Strait of Belle Isle	9.5	51.60°N 55.43°W	Off the Great Northern Peninsula
Random	Trinity Bay	255	48.117°N 53.733°W	South of the Bonavista Peninsula
Sandy Point	St. George's Bay	3	48.450°N 58.483°W	
Silver Fox	Bonavista Bay	2	49.01842°N 53.68388°W	
South Aulatsivik	Atlantic Ocean		56.76417°N 61.51639°W	
South Wolf	Labrador Sea		53.667°N 55.917°W	Uninhabited
Spotted	Labrador Sea		53.51°N 55.78°W	Former Pinetree Line site
Stony	Labrador Sea		52.99°N 55.81°W	
Square	Labrador Sea		52.73352°N 55.83715°W	By White Bear Arm off the Labrador coast
Swain's	Bonavista Bay		49.13929°N 53.54579°W	Group of eight islands
Trump Islands (Newfoundland and Labrador)	Notre Dame Bay		49°34′30″N 54°46′09″W	Uninhabited
Twillingate	Notre Dame Bay		49.650°N 54.750°W	From the French name, Toulinquet
Venison	Labrador Sea	1	52.970°N 55.775°W	Former wireless telegraph station
Wadham	Atlantic Ocean		49.59178°N 53.76360°W	
Woody Island	Placentia Bay			

== See also ==
- Geography of Newfoundland and Labrador
