= Newfoundland and Labrador Route 420 =

Highway in Newfoundland and Labrador, Canada

Route 420
- White Bay South Highway

Route information
- Maintained by Newfoundland and Labrador Department of Transportation and Infrastructure
- Length: 67.7 km (42.1 mi)

Major junctions
- South end: Route 1 (TCH) near Sandy Lake
- Route 422 near Sandy Lake; Route 421 to Hampden
- North end: Former Great Harbour Deep Ferry Terminal in Jackson's Arm

Location
- Country: Canada
- Province: Newfoundland and Labrador

Highway system
- Highways in Newfoundland and Labrador
← Route 419	→ Route 421

Route 420, also known as White Bay South Highway, is a 67.7-kilometre-long (42.1 mi) north-south highway located in the western region of Newfoundland in the Canadian province of Newfoundland and Labrador. It starts at its southern terminus at an intersection on the Trans-Canada Highway (Route 1), near Sandy Lake, and ends at its northern terminus, the town of Jackson's Arm, passing through several other communities in between.

== Route description ==
Route 420 begins at an intersection with Route 1 (Trans-Canada Highway) along the northern shore of Sandy Lake (part of Grand Lake) and it heads north to immediately have an intersection with Route 422 (Cormack Road) before heading through rural areas for several kilometres. Route 422 is not signed at this intersection, through the designation and road both exist. The highway now has an intersection with Route 421 (Hampden Road) before heading up a narrow valley through hilly terrain for several kilometres to pass through Pollards Point and cross the Main River (via the Main River Bridge) before having an intersection with a local road leading to Sop's Arm. Route 420 passes through more rural and hilly terrain for several more kilometres to enter Jackson's Arm, where it ends at the former Great Harbour Deep Ferry docks after passing through town.

== Major intersections ==
Location	km	mi	Destinations	Notes
	0.0	0.0	Route 1 (TCH) – Deer Lake, Grand Falls-Windsor	Southern terminus
	0.4	0.25	Route 422 west (Cormack Road) – Cormack	Eastern terminus of Route 422; Route 422 is unsigned at this intersection
	10.0	6.2	Route 421 north (Hampden Road) – Hampden	Southern terminus of Route 421
Pollards Point	47.7	29.6	Pollards Point Road (Route 420-10) - Downtown	
	50.3	31.3	Sop's Arm Road - Sop's Arm	
Jackson's Arm	67.7	42.1	Dead End at former Great Harbour Deep Ferry docks	Northern terminus
1.000 mi = 1.609 km; 1.000 km = 0.621 mi
