= Wolf Island (disambiguation) =

Wolf Island is an island in the Galápagos Islands.

Wolf Island may also refer to:

== Islands and settlements ==
=== Canada ===
- Wolf Island (Lower Buckhorn Lake), in Lower Buckhorn Lake, Peterborough County, Ontario
- South Wolf Island, of the Wolf Islands, Labrador

=== United States ===
- Wolf Island, now called Kudobin Islands, Alaska
- Wolf Island National Wildlife Refuge, McIntosh County, Georgia
- Wolf Island, Missouri, an unincorporated community
  - Wolf Island Township, Mississippi County, Missouri (inactive)
- Wolf Island, an island of Montana, in the Missouri River
- Wolf Island (Tennessee), on the Tennessee River

== Other uses ==
- Wolf Island (novel), by Darren Shan, 2008

== See also ==
- Wolfe Island, Ontario, Canada
- Wolfe Island, a novel by Lucy Treloar
