= Newfoundland and Labrador Route 421 =

Highway in Newfoundland and Labrador, Canada

Route 421
- Hampden Road

Route information
- Maintained by Newfoundland and Labrador Department of Transportation and Infrastructure
- Length: 15.7 km (9.8 mi)

Major junctions
- South end: Route 420 near Hampden
- North end: The Beaches

Location
- Country: Canada
- Province: Newfoundland and Labrador

Highway system
- Highways in Newfoundland and Labrador
← Route 420	→ Route 422

Route 421, also known as Hampden Road, is a 15.7-kilometre-long (9.8 mi) north-south highway on northwestern Newfoundland in the Canadian province of Newfoundland and Labrador. It connects the town of Hampden, along with some other communities, with Route 420 (White Bay South Highway).

== Route description ==
Route 421 begins at an intersection with Route 420 near the Trans-Canada Highway (Route 1) and it heads north through wooded areas for several kilometres to enter the Hampden town limits. The highway passes through the Bayside neighbourhood, where it has an intersection with a local road leading to Gold Cove, before passing through downtown. Route 421 now begins following the coastline as it leaves Hampden and passes through Galeville before entering The Beaches and coming to a dead end at the northern edge of the community.

== Major intersections ==
Location	km	mi	Destinations	Notes
	0.0	0.0	Route 420 (White Bay South Highway) to Route 1 (TCH) – Sop's Arm, Jackson's Arm	Southern terminus
Hampden	10.0	6.2	Marine Drive - Gold Cove	
The Beaches	15.7	9.8	Dead End	Northern terminus
1.000 mi = 1.609 km; 1.000 km = 0.621 mi
