= Pouch =

Pouch may refer to:

- A small bag such as a:
  - packet (container)
  - teabag
  - money bag
  - sporran
  - fanny pack or buffalo pouch
- Pouch (marsupial), an anatomical feature in which young are carried
- Cadaver pouch, a body bag
- Diplomatic pouch, a container for carrying items between a diplomatic mission and its home government
- Electric heating pouch, medical apparatus, electric heating device for curative treatment
- Indiana pouch, a surgically created urinary diversion used to create a way for the body to store and eliminate urine for patients who have had their urinary bladders removed
- Ileo-anal pouch, surgically created intestinal reservoir which is in or added to the body
- Nicotine pouch, a small rectangle containing nicotine, flavorings and other ingredients.
- Ostomy pouching system (colostomy bag), medical prosthetic that provides a means for the collection of waste from a diverted biological system
- Pouch laminator, lamination system that utilizes pouches
- Retort pouch, food and drink pouch
- Stand-up pouch a type of flexible packaging that stands erect for sale or storage
- (U+1F45D) unicode symbol "POUCH", see Emoji

== Places ==
- Pouch, Germany, a municipality in Saxony-Anhalt, Germany
- Pouch Cove, Newfoundland and Labrador
- Pouch Island, Newfoundland and Labrador

== Species ==
- Pouch (orchids), Cypripedioideae, orchid species
- Pouched rat, African rodent characterized by large cheek pouches

== See also ==
- Bursar, Latin for pouch or purse
- Pouch Attachment Ladder System (PALS)
- Throbbing Pouch, 1995 electronica hip-hip album by Wagon Christ
- Pooch (disambiguation)
- Purse (disambiguation)
- Sac (disambiguation)
