= Newfoundland and Labrador Route 422 =

Highway in Newfoundland and Labrador, Canada

Route 422
- Cormack Road

Route information
- Maintained by Newfoundland and Labrador Department of Transportation and Infrastructure
- Length: 46.2 km (28.7 mi)

Major junctions
- West end: Route 430 north of Deer Lake
- East end: Route 420 north of Sandy Lake

Location
- Country: Canada
- Province: Newfoundland and Labrador

Highway system
- Highways in Newfoundland and Labrador
← Route 421	→ Route 430

Route 422, also known as Cormack Road, is a relatively short highway on western Newfoundland in the Canadian province of Newfoundland and Labrador. The route travels through its only community, Cormack, and to Sir Richard Squires Memorial Provincial Park.

== Route description ==
Route 422 begins at an intersection with Route 430 (Great Northern Peninsula Highway/Viking Trail) just north of Deer Lake and it heads northeast to immediately cross a brook. The highway heads through rural farmland for several kilometres to pass through the centre of Cormack as Veterans Drive. Route 422 now turns to gravel as it turns southeast through wooded areas to cross the Humber River and pass by Sir Richard Squires Memorial Provincial Park. The highway now winds its way east through more wooded terrain for several kilometres before coming to an end at an unmarked intersection with Route 420 (White Bay South Highway), just a half kilometre north of its intersection with Route 1 (Trans-Canada Highway). There is no signage of any kind at the intersection between Route 422 and Route 420.

== Major intersections ==
Location	km	mi	Destinations	Notes
	0.0	0.0	Route 430 (Great Northern Peninsula Highway/Viking Trail) to Route 1 (TCH) – Deer Lake, Rocky Harbour, St. Anthony	Western terminus
Cormack	14.2	8.8	Road turns to gravel	
	30.0	18.6	Sir Richard Squires Memorial Provincial Park main entrance	Access road into park
	46.2	28.7	Route 420 (White Bay South Highway) to Route 1 (TCH) – Hampden, Jackson's Arm	Eastern terminus
1.000 mi = 1.609 km; 1.000 km = 0.621 mi
