= Granby Island =

Island in Newfoundland and Labrador, Canada

Coordinates: 49.740724°N 56.718957°W

Location of Granby Island in Newfoundland

Granby island is a small island located in White Bay in the Canadian province of Newfoundland and Labrador. The nearest settlement is Pollards Point. The island last recorded a population of 38 in 1971, after which the remaining settlers moved to either the western side of Baie Verte peninsula or the eastern side of the Great North Peninsula.

== See also ==
- List of islands of Newfoundland and Labrador
