= Millers Island =

Island in Newfoundland and Labrador, Canada

Coordinates: 49.559°N 56.853°W

Location of Millers Island in Newfoundland

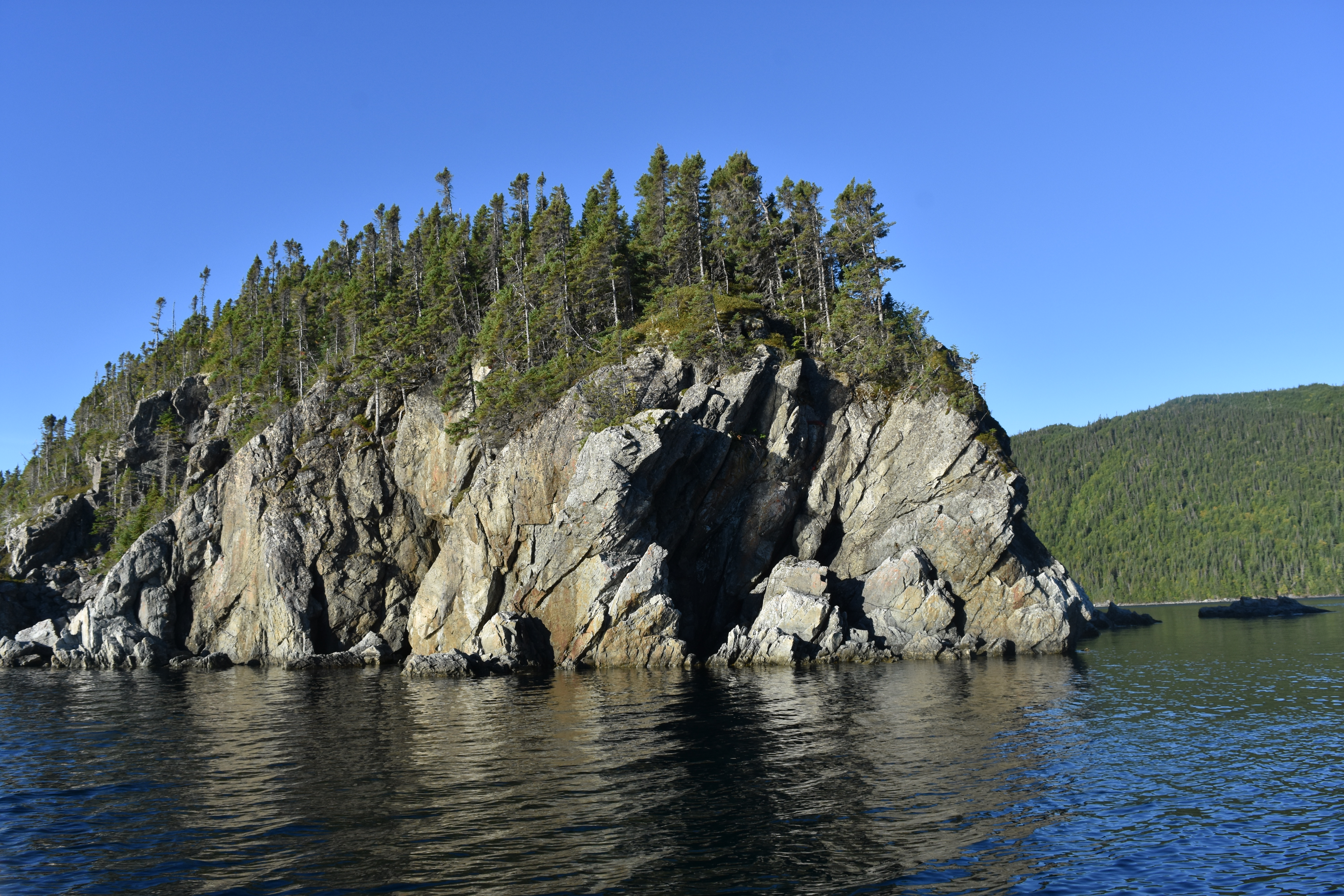
Millers Island

Millers Island (alternatively Cerise) is a small island located in White Bay in the Canadian province of Newfoundland and Labrador. The nearest settlement is Hampden, where it can be seen clearly from the shore. On the island a graveyard from 1924 can be spotted, where victims of tuberculosis were buried in order to prevent the contamination of local water supplies. Its highest point is about 130 feet above the high-water line.

== See also ==
- List of islands of Newfoundland and Labrador
