= Venison (disambiguation) =

Venison is the meat of a game animal.

Venison may also refer to:

- Barry Venison (born 1964), English footballer and television pundit
- Venison Island, island in Newfoundland and Labrador, Canada
- Venison Tickle, Newfoundland and Labrador, settlement in Newfoundland and Labrador, Canada
- Haunch of Venison, art gallery in London, England
