= White Bay =

White Bay may refer to a number of geographic locations:

- White Bay (New South Wales), Sydney, Australia
- White Bay (Newfoundland), Canada
- White Bay, British Virgin Islands
- Bahía Blanca (White Bay) in the south east of the province of Buenos Aires, Argentina
- White Bay, Umm Al Quwain - United Arab Emirates
