= Keats Island =

Keats Island may refer to:

- Keats Island (British Columbia), Canada
- Keats Island (Newfoundland and Labrador), Canada
