= Paul's Island =

Island in Newfoundland and Labrador, Canada

Coordinates: 56°31′N 61°30′W

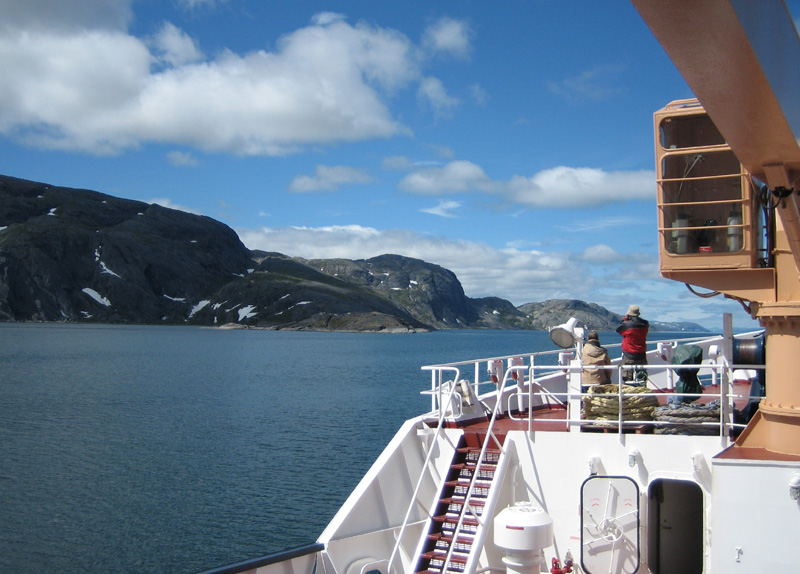
Paul Island coast

Paul's Island or Paul Island is an island off the coast of Labrador, near the town of Nain in Canada.

The island is the geological type area of the mineral labradorite, which is a plagioclase feldspar. Labradorite is the principal component of the igneous rock type anorthosite. The Nain anorthosite batholith is a large igneous plutonic rock complex that covers a large area of this part of Labrador.

== See also ==
- Islands of Newfoundland and Labrador
