= Hampden, Newfoundland and Labrador =

Hampden
- Town
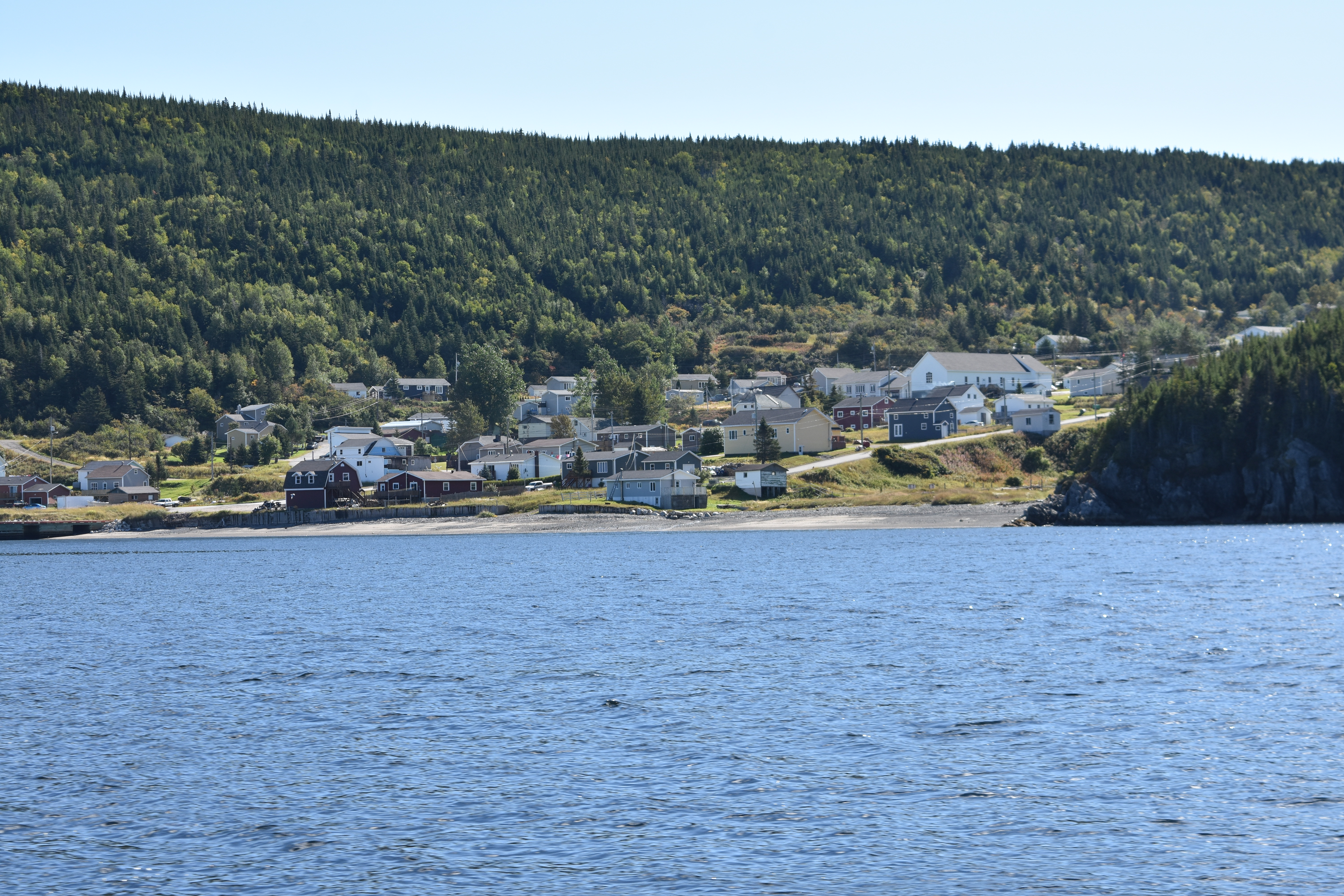
- Hampden from the White Bay

- Location of Hampden in Newfoundland Location of Hampden in Canada
- Coordinates: 49.533°N 56.867°W
- Country: Canada
- Province: Newfoundland and Labrador
- The Town of Hampden: December 1959
- Named for: John Hampden

Government
  - Mayor: Calvin Wilton
  - MHA: vacant
  - MP: Carol Anstey (Cons)

Area
  - Total: 32.9 km^{2} (12.7 sq mi)
- Elevation: 100 m (330 ft)

Population (2021)
  - Total: 439
- Time zone: UTC-3:30 (Newfoundland Time)
  - Summer (DST): UTC-2:30 (Newfoundland Daylight)
- Postal Code: A0K 2Y0
- Area code: 709
- Highways: Route 421

Hampden is a town in the Canadian province of Newfoundland and Labrador. The town has a population of 429. Two islands can be seen from the shore of Hampden, Granby Island and Millers Island. The latter is much closer to the town and is the host of a tuberculosis grave-site.

== History ==
Hampden was named after English politician John Hampden.

Many communities were resettled into Hampden after the island was brought into Canadian Confederation on 31 March 1949, where the Joey Smallwood government pushed a resettlement plan that involved over 300 villages and 28,000 people.

Hampden was and still is to this day a logging and lumber town. Over the years many companies cut logs for lumber mills and pulpwood for paper mills. Thousands of cords of wood were boomed to the Bottom (furthest point south in White Bay) at an early time (1920s - 1930s) it was debarked and loaded aboard ships for England for the International Paper Company of Newfoundland. Later (1940s - 1970s) it was loaded on to trucks and brought to the Humber River at Riverside where it was dumped into the river and floated down the river to the Bowater’s Paper Mill in Corner Brook.

To this day Hampden still relies of the logging industry as it main source of employment, Burton’s Cove Logging and Lumber Limited is the largest employer in the White Bay South area, employing forty plus employees year round.

== Demographics ==
In the 2021 Census of Population conducted by Statistics Canada, Hampden had a population of 439 living in 196 of its 217 total private dwellings, a change of 2.3% from its 2016 population of 429. With a land area of 32.99 km^{2} (12.74 sq mi), it had a population density of 13.3/km^{2} (34.5/sq mi) in 2021.

== 2025 Municipal Election ==
Municipal Election was held on October 2, 2025.

Calvin Wilton was elected Mayor by acclamation.

Councilor elections were held with Everett Davis, William Gale, Jackie Hewitt, Karen Hoddinott, Karen Osmond, Kyle Osmond, Robert Osmond, Barry Pilgrim, and Kelly Stoddart competing for the four Councilor positions.

Election Results

Election 2025
Candidates	Votes
Karen Hoddinott	150
Barry Pilgrim	144
Kyle Osmond	134
Everett Davis	104
William Gale	95
Robert Osmond	87
Jackie Hewitt	74
Karen Osmond	68
Kelly Stoddart	63

== See also ==
- List of cities and towns in Newfoundland and Labrador
