= Fanny's Harbour =

Coordinates: 55.837°N 60.323°W

Location of Fanny's Harbour in Newfoundland and Labrador

Fanny's Harbour is a harbour on Nunaksaluk Island in Newfoundland and Labrador. The place is named for a folk song "Fanny's Harbour Bawn." In the song, a man sees his love interest in another man's arms, and loses the fight they have over her.
