= Pooch (disambiguation) =

Pooch is a colloquial term for a dog.

Pooch also refers to:

== People ==
- William F. Donovan (1865-1928), Harvard University track and football coach
- Pooch Hall (born 1977), American actor, rapper and model
- Pooch, Arthur Paul Tavares (born 1942), a member of Tavares, an American R&B, funk and soul music group

== In arts and entertainment ==
- Pooch the Pup, an anthropomorphic dog by Walter Lantz
- Satchel Pooch, a character in the comic Get Fuzzy
- The Pooch, a 1932 Our Gang short

== Other uses ==
- Project POOCH, a rehabilitation program pairing dogs with incarcerated juveniles
- A nickname for the GE P30CH locomotive
- Slang for a big belly

== See also ==
- Pooch punt, a kick in American football
- Poochie (disambiguation)
- Ponch (disambiguation)
