= Sop's Arm =

Community in Newfoundland and Labrador, Canada

Coordinates: 49.773°N 56.881°W

Location of Sop's Arm in Newfoundland and Labrador

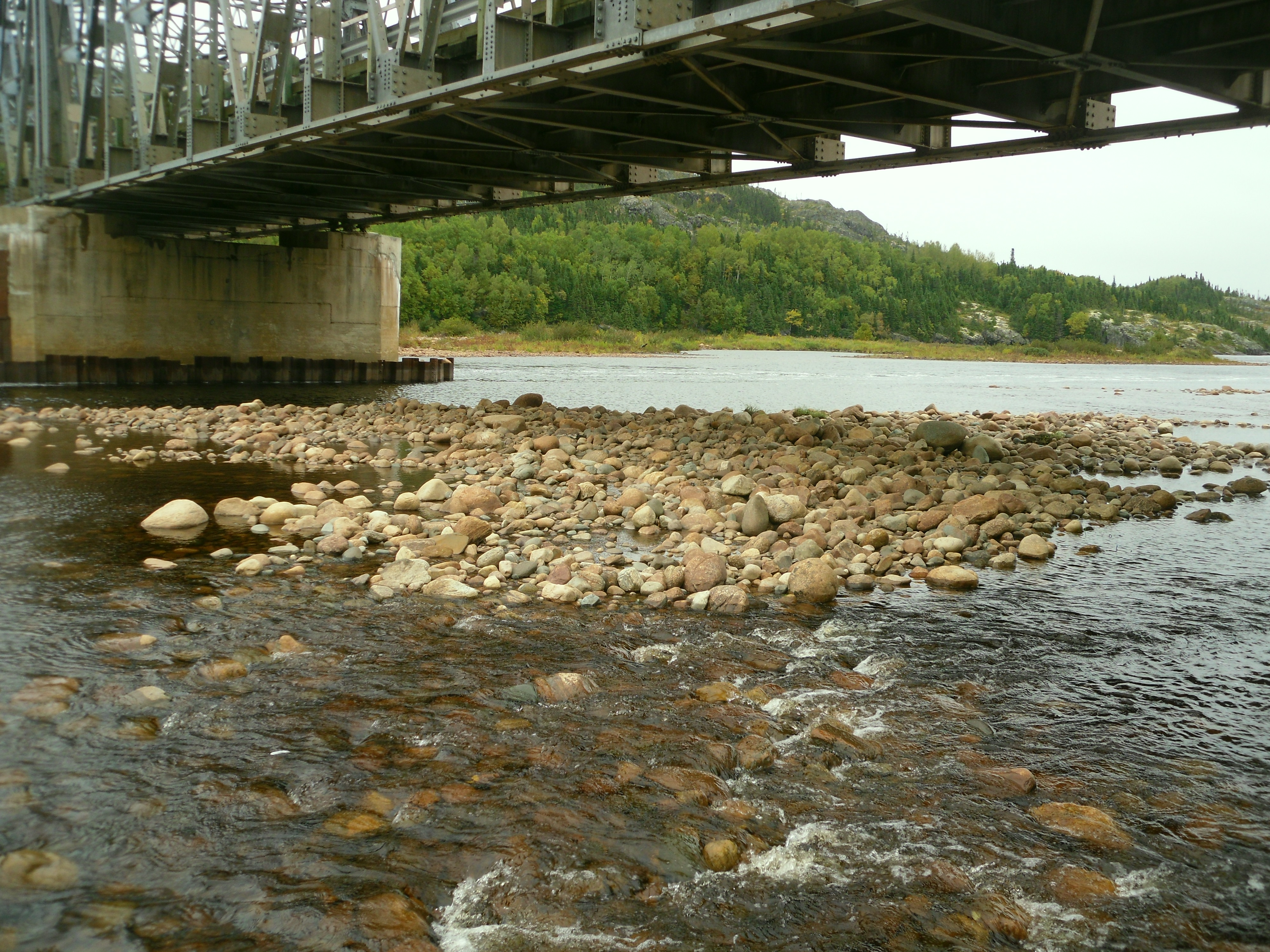
Main River, Sop's Arm

Sop's Arm is a local service district and designated place in the Canadian province of Newfoundland and Labrador. The community was formed in the 1930s and 1940s by families moving from surrounding communities, including Jackson's Arm. In the 1950s and 1960s families from nearby Sop's Island moved to Sop's Arm, towing their houses across the channel of water.

Today, the community of Sop's Arm stretches from the mouth of Main River, a river provincially well known for its salmon fishing and white-water kayaking, north to Schooner's Cove.

Traditionally, the economy was based on the cod and salmon fishery, forestry, including sawing lumber and cutting wood for the Corner Brook Pulp and Paper Mill.

Possible Norse hunting pits have been excavated near Sop's Arm. Watson Budden, a local resident, showed these in 1961 to Helge Ingstad, the archaeologist who investigated L'Anse aux Meadows, the only Viking settlement to be attested in North America, which is approximately 200 kilometres (120 mi) away. His nephew Kent Budden assembled a collection of suspected Norse artefacts in the area and displayed them in a Viking museum. Kevin McAleese, a curator of archaeology and ethnology at the Provincial Museum of Newfoundland and Labrador, led an investigation of the pits in 2010 and has said that no other cultures in the area are known to have used deadfalls to hunt, but doubts Budden's artefacts are Norse. It has been argued that Sop's Arm is the Straumfjörð of the Vinland sagas.

== Geography ==
Sop's Arm is in Newfoundland within Subdivision G of Division No. 5.

=== Sop's Island ===
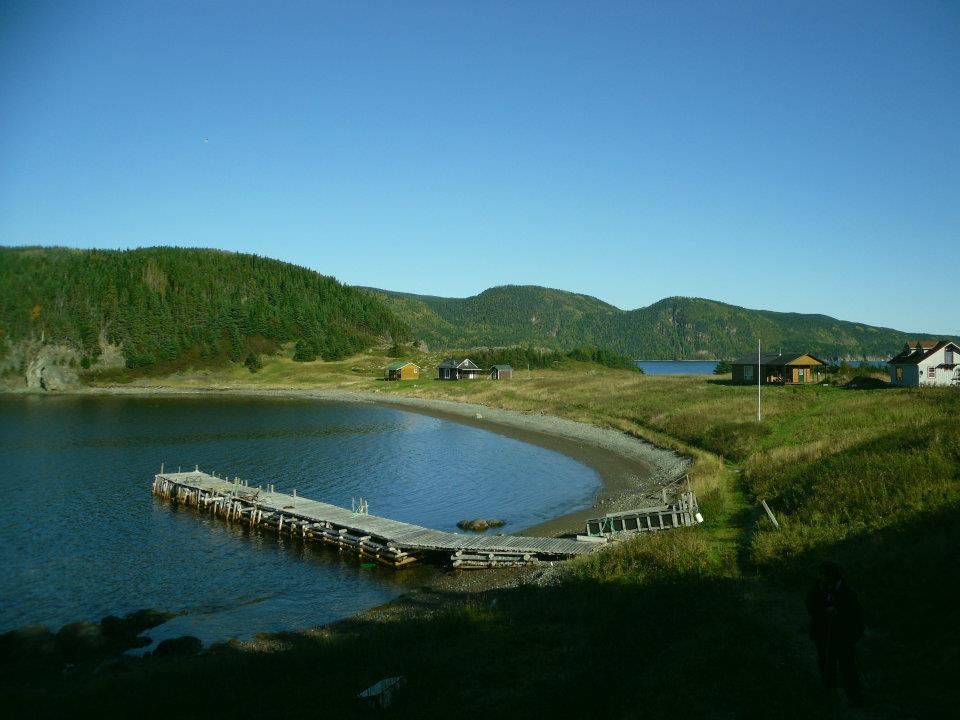
Houses on Sop's Island

Sop's island was inhabited until the mid-1950s, when the government resettled the families to the mainland. Sop's Island residents were encouraged to move by the Joey Smallwood Government to ease the economic burden of public education, transportation (of mail, food and other supplies) and utilities. Access to Sop's Island was often hindered in the spring of the year due to impassable slob ice. This proved to be a serious health hazard for those needing immediate medical attention. Locals also complained of the inconsistent water supply on Sop's Island.

The island was home to 85 people in 1921, and 220 people in 1935. The island had a school, two churches, cemeteries, and a wood mill. Moose and caribou can be found on the island. The west side of the island is lush and wooded, while the east side is rocky and barren.

Fewer than ten summer cottages are still maintained on the island, most owned by families of the original Sop's Island natives. Sop's Island is protected by the Canadian Forest Service.

In addition to Sop's Arm, nearby communities include Jackson's Arm to the north and Pollard's Point just south and east of Main River.

== Demographics ==
As a designated place in the 2016 Census of Population conducted by Statistics Canada, Sop's Arm recorded a population of 157 living in 72 of its 123 total private dwellings, a change of -20.3% from its 2011 population of 197. With a land area of 7.42 km^{2} (2.86 sq mi), it had a population density of 21.2/km^{2} (54.8/sq mi) in 2016.

== Government ==
Sop's Arm is a local service district (LSD) that is governed by a committee responsible for the provision of certain services to the community. The chair of the LSD committee is Milton Rice.

== See also ==
- List of communities in Newfoundland and Labrador
- List of designated places in Newfoundland and Labrador
- List of local service districts in Newfoundland and Labrador
