= Bull, Cow and Calf =

Islands in Canada

Coordinates: 46°46′33.35″N 54°05′55.60″W

Bull, Cow and Calf are a cluster of islands on the south coast of the Avalon Peninsula of the island of Newfoundland in the province of Newfoundland and Labrador. These islands are at approximately the same latitude, and constitute the most southern islands of the province. Conversely, the most northerly island is North Star Island.

These three islands are a cluster of number of islands and rocky crags that lie 3.1 km southwest of Point Lance. The largest of these, Cow, measures 145 m by 85 m.

== See also ==
- Geography of Newfoundland and Labrador
