= Poochi =

Poochi may refer to:

- Poochi Srinivasa Iyengar (1860–1919), Indian singer and composer of Carnatic music
- Poochi (Powerpuff Girls character)
- Poochi (film), a 2008 Indian Tamil-language film
- Poo-Chi, robot dog created by Tiger Toys

== See also ==
- Poochie (disambiguation)
