= Great Harbour Deep =

Former Municipality in Newfoundland, Canada

Coordinates: 50°22′19″N 56°31′05″W

Great Harbour Deep was an incorporated town in the province of Newfoundland and Labrador, Canada, situated on the east coast of the Great Northern Peninsula, in White Bay inlet. Harbour Deep, as it is customarily called, is a logging and fishing community that lies at the head of Pigeonnière Arm. It was once known as Orange Bay or Baie L'Orange.

The town was originally settled by the French in the 17th century and was predominantly a fishing village.

Newfoundland and Labrador have a history of resettling small remote communities dating back to the 1940s. These communities have been abandoned or resettled as either fish stock in the local waters depleted to the point that the community could no longer survive, or as weather and illness made the communities uninhabitable.

In the 1960s, a push by the province to resettle the community was rebuffed because of the robust fishing grounds off Great Harbour Deep. Despite being a major source of fish, the province never built a road into the community. Getting to Great Harbour Deep required a three-hour ferry trip from Jackson's Arm, or floatplane.

In 1992, The Canadian government imposed a moratorium on fishing for Northern cod on the country's east coast. Due to decades of over-fishing, the species was significantly depleted. The moratorium had a significant negative impact on communities like Great Harbour Deep.

By the early 2000s, scarcity of opportunity led the town residents to vote to resettle. It cost the province $3.8 million to relocate the residents, according to government documents, with 53 residents provided between $80,000 and $100,000 to move. That $3.8 million was recovered in four years, through savings from no longer delivering services which were once necessary for the town to operate. Those services included the local school and ferry that linked the town to Jackson's Arm. However, the $3.8 million total did not include any pending or future settlement amounts related to litigation.

== Legal Action ==
Of the total residents of the town, 21 households that were considered "seasonal" only received fair market value for their properties. Fourteen of those accepted the governments offer, however seven homeowners decided to seek additional compensation through legal action. One of those seven said in an interview with The Western Star that they had only been offered $15,000 for their home.

As of 2010, the government had settled all legal claims related to the seven properties.

== Continued Focus ==
In 2008, having heard the story of Great Harbour Deep, a musician from Cape Breton, Nova Scotia, J.P. Cormier, wrote and released the song Great Harbour Deep as part of his The Messenger album.

In 2018, Baccalieu Media Inc produced a one-hour documentary about the resettlement of this town for CBC's Absolutely Canadian documentary series called Great Harbour Deep, profiling town residents before the move, and revisiting the ghost town and the residents 15 years later. The documentary features the last "Running of the Goat" in Great Harbour Deep, a traditional dance that was born in the town.

== See also ==
- List of communities in Newfoundland and Labrador
- Resettlement (Newfoundland)
