= Hunt's Island =

Island in Newfoundland

- Location within Newfoundland

Geography
- Coordinates: 47°35′58″N 57°36′41″W

Administration
- Canada
- Province: Newfoundland and Labrador
- Census division: No. 3
- Subdivision: F

Hunt's Island is an abandoned fishing settlement in the District of Burgeo-La Poile, on the south west coast of Newfoundland, Canada. It was settled in the 1830s and resettled in 1963. In 1911, its population peaked at 244. This declined to 175 in 1921, rebounded to 178 in 1935, and declined again to 132 in 1945, the last year it was listed separately in the census. Hunt's Island is located in census division 3, subdivision F.

Population
Year	Pop.	±%
1891	188	—
1901	188	+0.0%
1911	244	+29.8%
1921	175	−28.3%
1935	178	+1.7%
1945	132	−25.8%
Source: Memorial University of Newfoundland - Digital Archives Initiative, Census of Newfoundland and Labrador

== See also ==
- List of communities in Newfoundland and Labrador
- List of ghost towns in Newfoundland and Labrador
- List of islands of Newfoundland and Labrador
- Burgeo-La Poile
