= Woody Island, Newfoundland and Labrador =

Island in Newfoundland and Labrador, Canada

Coordinates: 47.779°N 54.197°W

Location of Woody Island in Newfoundland and Labrador

Woody Island is an island and former settlement in Placentia Bay, Newfoundland and Labrador.

== History ==
Woody Island had a population of 261 persons in 1921. The community was largely resettled by a provincial government program in the 1960s, but a small population remained into the early 1990s. Many of the original buildings and houses are currently still on the island, including a stone house. The first mayor of Woody Island was a man named Edgar Williams. His cabinet included people like Beaton Williams (his brother), Cecil Oliver, Alec and James Lockyer, and Wilson Williams. The council meetings were held in the basement of the house of Alec Lockyer.

== Economy ==
The primary economic activity on Woody Island is the fishery. Fishermen harvest cod, crab, lobster, and scallops. Other summer residents are employed is a tourism business, Woody Island Resort. This business employees about 20 people on a seasonal basis, including musicians, cooks and general staff for the resort. The original old shop has now been turned into a small museum featuring many items owned by previous inhabitants of Woody Island.

== See also ==
- Resettlement (Newfoundland)
- Merasheen Island
- Merasheen
