= Orange Bay (Newfoundland and Labrador) =

Bay in Newfoundland and Labrador, Canada

Coordinates: 50.367°N 56.433°W

Location of Orange Bay in Newfoundland

Orange Bay (Baie L'Orange), also known as Great Harbour Deep, is a natural bay located on the eastern side of the Northern Peninsula of the island of Newfoundland, in the Canadian province of Newfoundland and Labrador.

Soufflets River drains into the northern arm of Orange Bay. The abandoned community of Great Harbour Deep was located on the Southern arm.
