= Poochie =

Poochie or Poochy may refer to:

== People ==
- Wardell Fouse (1960–2003), also known as Poochie, a gang member implicated in the murder of The Notorious B.I.G.
- Poochie Puett, or Devyn Puett (born 1977), American actress and singer

== Characters ==
- Poochie (Pirates of the Caribbean), the jail dog in the film The Curse of the Black Pearl
- Poochie (The Simpsons), an anthropomorphic dog first appearing in "The Itchy & Scratchy & Poochie Show"
- Poochie, a character in the Donald Duck universe
- Poochie (toy), a Mattel brand toy dog and 1984 tie-in animated television special

== See also ==
- Pooch (disambiguation)
- Poochi (disambiguation)
- Poo-Chi, a robot dog
