= Merasheen Island =

Island in Newfoundland and Labrador, Canada

Coordinates: 47°27′26″N 54°14′45″W

Location of Merasheen Island in Newfoundland

Merasheen Island is an island in Newfoundland and Labrador, Canada. With a length of approximately 35 km and a width at its widest point of 9 km, it is situated about 6 km from Presque. It is the largest island in the Placentia Bay.

The island had a resident population of several hundred in the town of Merasheen, with an economy based on fishing, until the inhabitants were moved out under the provincial government's resettlement programme, with the last ones leaving in 1968.

== Notable people ==
Trina Fulford, one half of the comedy music duo Corey and Trina, came from Merasheen Island.

== See also ==
- Woody Island, Newfoundland and Labrador
