= Main River (Newfoundland and Labrador) =

River in Newfoundland and Labrador, Canada

Coordinates: 49°46′07.32″N 56°54′20.36″W

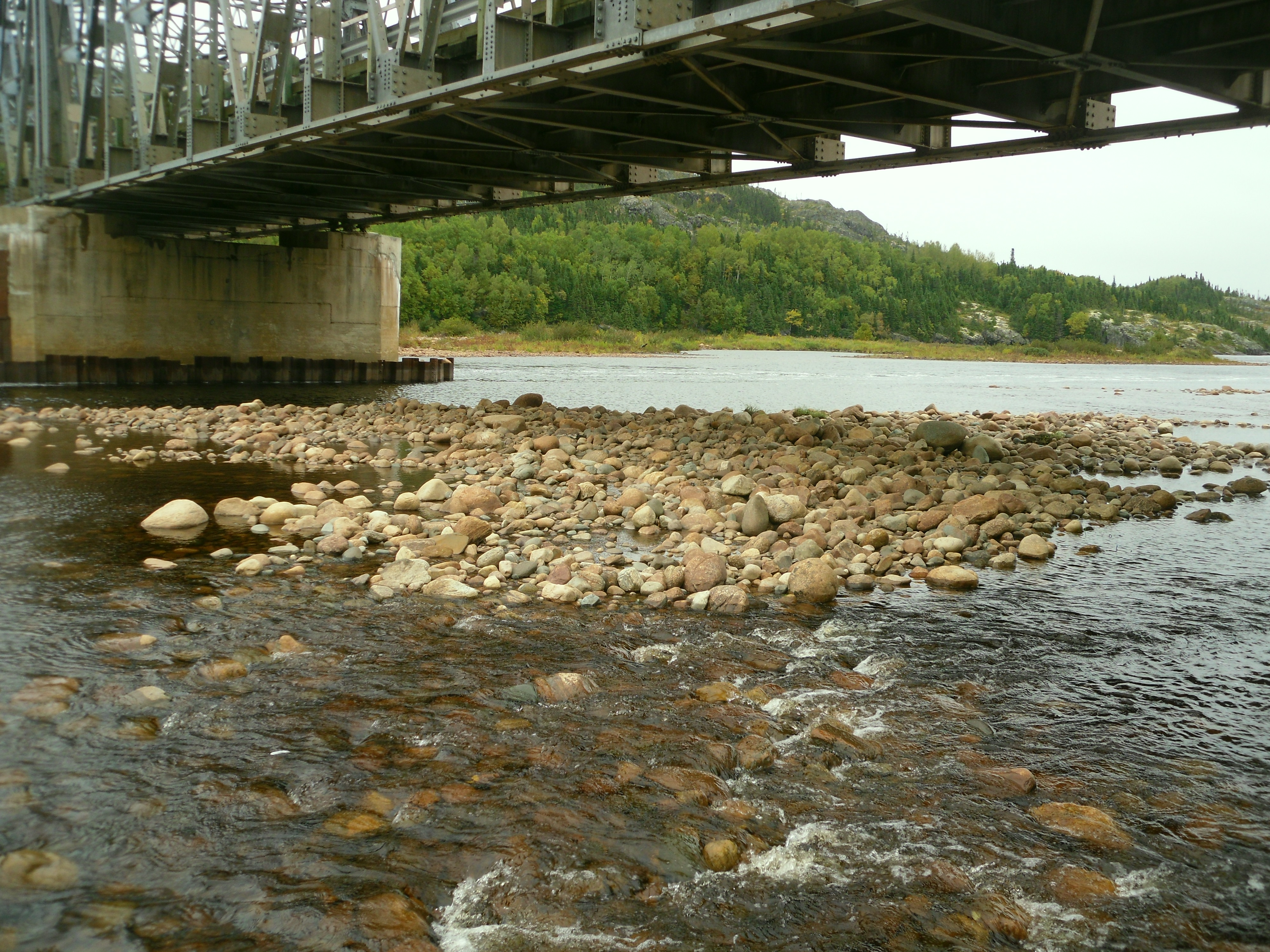
Main River is a river in Newfoundland, Canada.

Main River is a river in Newfoundland, Canada, a very popular canoeing destination. It is 57 km long, originates in the Long Range Mountains and enters the sea at White Bay.

== History ==
Main River was designated a Canadian Heritage River in February 2001.

== See also ==
- List of rivers of Newfoundland and Labrador
