= Merasheen, Newfoundland and Labrador =

Coordinates: 47°24′N 54°20′W

Merasheen is a community located on the southwestern tip of Merasheen Island in Placentia Bay in Newfoundland and Labrador, Canada. It was one of the largest and most prosperous communities in Placentia Bay to be resettled, with the provincial government paying residents to abandon the community and relocate to designated growth centres during the 1960s.
