= Stony Island (Newfoundland and Labrador) =

- Location within Newfoundland and Labrador

Geography
- Coordinates: 52.99°N 55.81°W
- Highest elevation: 200 m (700 ft)

Administration
- Canada
- Province: Newfoundland and Labrador

Stony Island is a large island off of the coast of Labrador. Cooper Island lies to the south, Hawke Island to the north and Venison Island to the east. A small harbour named Tub Harbour is located on the west side of the island. A fishing station was established there in 1885 but had been abandoned by 1965.
