= Nunaksaluk Island =

Island in Newfoundland and Labrador, Canada

- Location of Nunaksaluk Island off the Labrador coast.

Geography
- Coordinates: 55.8°N 60.3°W

Administration
- Canada

Nunaksaluk Island is an island off the coast of Labrador in the North Atlantic Ocean. The island's indigenous name is translatable to "irrelevant country for habitation". In 1932 HMS Challenger anchored off the island during its surveying of Labrador.

Fanny's Harbour is located on the northeast part of the island.
