= Project POOCH =

Project POOCH (POOCH is an acronym for "Positive Opportunities, Obvious Change with Hounds") is a 501(c)(3) nonprofit organization that aims to rehabilitate incarcerated youths by actively training difficult-to-adopt dogs.

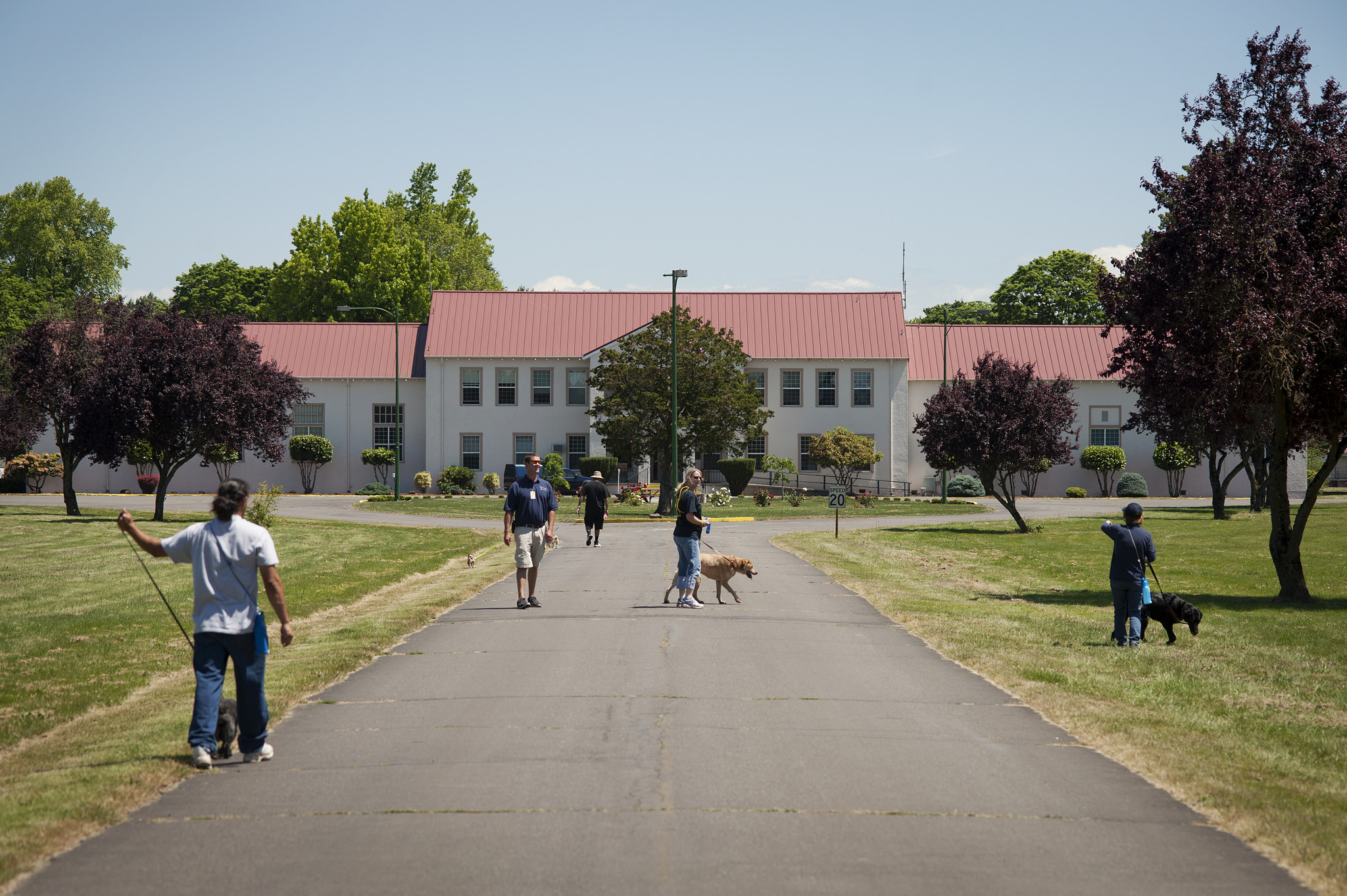
Youth at MacLaren socialize rescue dogs for Project POOCH

In 1993, the program was started by Joan Dalton at MacLaren Youth Correctional Facility in Woodburn, Oregon, United States. The program's success has garnered it international attention, with similar programs established in South Korea and Scotland, as well as Japanese television shows and documentaries about the program. The project has also been featured on Animal Planet.

Dogs from local animal shelters are taken in by Project POOCH and paired with young offenders, most of whom have been convicted of serious crimes such as murder and sexual assault. The dogs often have behavioral problems, including excessive barking or aggression.

For her doctoral dissertation, Sandra Merriam-Aduini studied the effects of Project POOCH had on violent, incarcerated male juveniles inmates, studying effects on recidivism, reformation, and behavioral changes linked to human-animal interactions emphasizing responsibility, patience, and compassion.

Between 1993 and 1999, Merriam-Aduini found zero recidivism of POOCH participants and that the program achieved educational expectations and judicial orders with success rates, including marked behavior improvements in "respect for authority, social interaction and leadership", as well as "growth in areas of honesty, empathy, nurturing, social growth, understanding, confidence level, and pride of accomplishment".

"Rehabilitated" dogs are subsequently adopted by new homes following behavioral tests.
