= Cormack, Newfoundland and Labrador =

Cormack
- Town
- Seal

- Location of Cormack in Newfoundland
- Coordinates: 49°17′31″N 57°24′42″W
- Country: Canada
- Province: Newfoundland and Labrador

Area
  - Land: 133.88 km^{2} (51.69 sq mi)

Population (2021)
  - Total: 492
  - Density: 4.5/km^{2} (12/sq mi)
- Time zone: UTC-3:30 (Newfoundland Time)
  - Summer (DST): UTC-2:30 (Newfoundland Daylight)
- Area code: 709
- Highways: Route 422
- Website: townofcormack.com

Cormack is a farming community on the Great Northern Peninsula of Newfoundland.

== Foundation ==
After the Second World War, the Commission of Government allocated more than 12,000 hectares of land in the Humber River valley to returning war veterans. The men had to apply (163 of 217 applications were approved) and have farming experience, or be willing to take a 12-month training on the mainland. Families were provided with 20 hectares of land, a six-room house and seed money to fund buying livestock, farm equipment and a barn. By 1948, 96 farms had been started and the community named Cormack after explorer William Epps Cormack.

== Later history ==
After a period of growth in the 1950s the population began to decline in the 1970s, with residents moving from farming to construction and other types of work. Most farms had failed because of problems getting food produced to viable markets, compounded by high costs of feed, fertilizer and transportation. By the 1976 census, there were only 20 farms while most residents worked in neighbouring Deer Lake or Corner Brook.

In 1979, the Department of Rural, Agricultural and Northern Development built and equipped a centralized vegetable processing building at Cormack in an effort to combat potato dumping by mainland producers. The current government of Newfoundland runs a 243 hectare community pasture at Cormack, the largest of 30 throughout Newfoundland, providing cheap grazing for the cattle and sheep of the Cormack farmers and allowing the farmers' own land to be sown for winter feed. The government also provides veterinary services, mineral supplements, a programme of spraying and dusting for parasites, and the services of a purebred bull at the community pasture.

== Demographics ==
In the 2021 Census of Population conducted by Statistics Canada, Cormack had a population of 492 living in 206 of its 230 total private dwellings, a change of −17.6% from its 2016 population of 597. With a land area of 133.65 km^{2} (51.60 sq mi), it had a population density of 3.7/km^{2} (9.5/sq mi) in 2021.

== See also ==
- List of cities and towns in Newfoundland and Labrador
- Great Northern Peninsula
- Dominion of Newfoundland
