= Horse Chops Island =

- Location within Newfoundland and Labrador

Geography
- Coordinates: 53.86°N 57.04°W
- Highest elevation: 121 m (397 ft)

Administration
- Canada
- Province: Newfoundland and Labrador

Horse Chops Island is a small island off of the coast of Labrador near the mouth of Sandwich Bay. It is named for its many cliff-faced hills. A shallow bay named Black Duck Cove can be found on the north coast of the island. Munden Island lies just off the north point of Horse Chops Island, and to its northwest is another small group of islands, the Partridge Harbour Islands, which surround and shelter Partridge Harbour. Long and narrow, Pigeon Island lies about 1.5 km further northwest.
