= Wolf Island (Tennessee) =

Island in Tennessee, United States

Coordinates: 35.218970°N 88.299205°W

Wolf Island is a river island on the Tennessee River in Hardin County, Tennessee.

Wolf Island has the name of a pioneer settler.
