= Newfoundland Island (Labrador) =

Island of Labrador, Canada

- Location within Newfoundland and Labrador

Geography
- Coordinates: 53.85°N 56.94°W
- Highest elevation: 96 m (315 ft)

Administration
- Canada
- Province: Newfoundland and Labrador

Newfoundland Island is a small island off of the coast of Labrador near the mouth of Sandwich Bay. To the east lies Farrels Island, which is connected to Newfoundland Island at low tide. In 1884, Farrels Island was populated. Further to the east lies Independent Island and together the islands form Independent Harbour To the west lies Pigeon Island and to the northwest Pickens Island and Packs Harbour Islands.
