= Labradorite =

Plagioclase feldspar with 50–70% anorthite

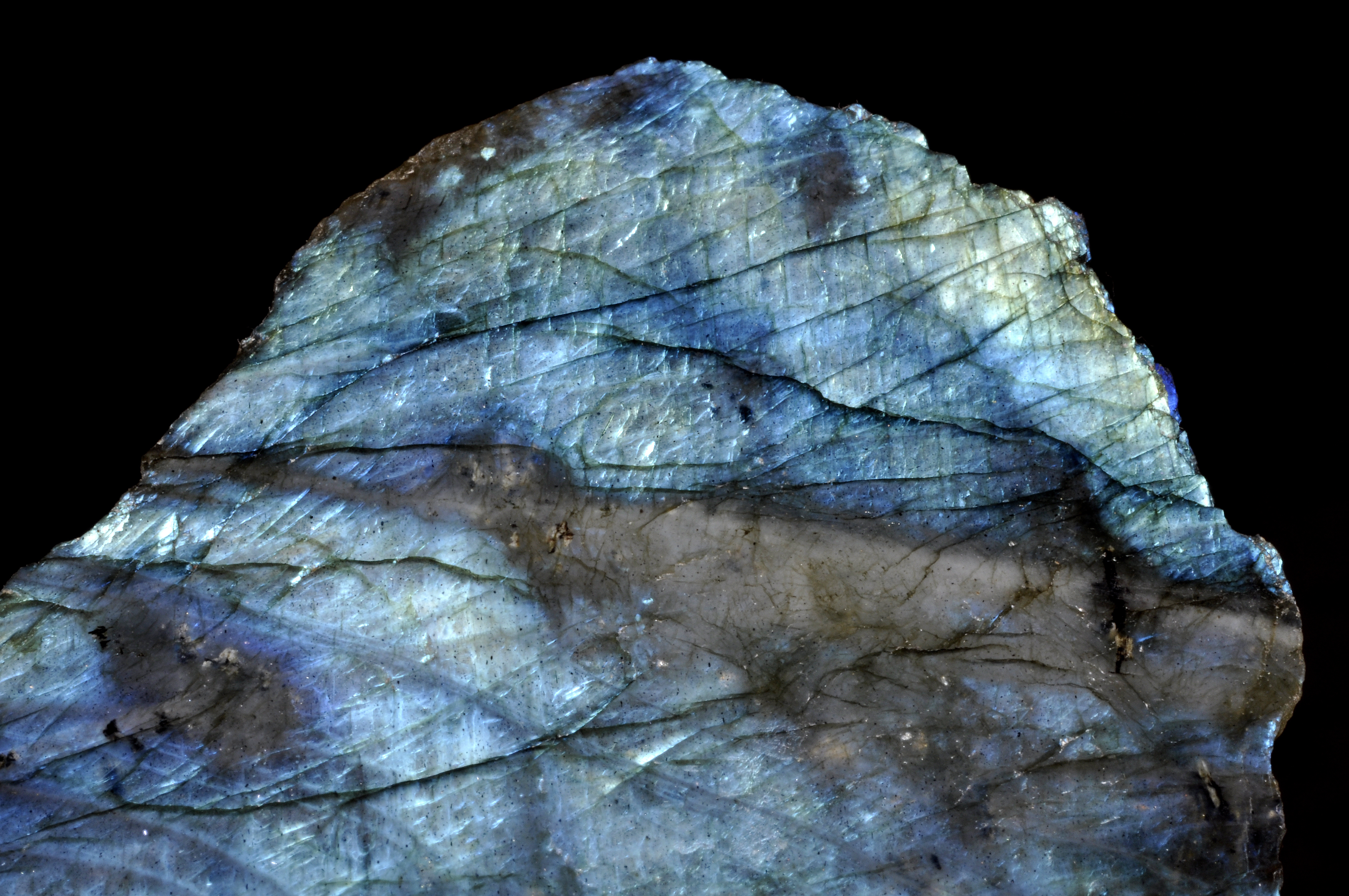
- Labradorite in a polished rock slab

General
- Category: Tectosilicate minerals
- Group: Feldspar group
- Series: Plagioclase feldspar series
- Formula: (Ca,Na)(Al,Si)_{4}O_{8} (Na:Ca = 30:70 to 50:50)
- IMA status: Variety of anorthite
- Crystal system: Triclinic
- Crystal class: Pinacoidal (1̅)
- Space group: P1̅ (no. 2)
- Unit cell: a = 8.155 Å, b = 12.84 Å c = 10.16 Å; α = 93.5° β = 116.25°, γ = 89.133°; Z = 6

Identification
- Color: Gray, gray-white, or colorless with blue, pale green, or brown iridescence Spectrolite: may display pink, orange, or purple iridescence
- Crystal habit: Crystals typically thin and tabular, rhombic in cross section, striated; massive
- Twinning: Common by albite, pericline, Carlsbad, Baveno, or Manebach twin laws
- Cleavage: Perfect on {001}, less perfect on {010}, intersecting at near 90°; distinct on {110}
- Fracture: Uneven to conchoidal
- Mohs scale hardness: 6–6.5
- Luster: Vitreous to pearly on cleavages
- Streak: White
- Diaphaneity: Translucent to transparent
- Specific gravity: 2.68 to 2.72
- Optical properties: Biaxial (+)
- Refractive index: n_{α} = 1.554–1.563 n_{β} = 1.559–1.568 n_{γ} = 1.562–1.573
- Birefringence: δ = 0.008–0.010
- 2V angle: Measured: 85°
- Dispersion: None
- Other characteristics: Labradorescence (iridescence, schiller optical effect)

Labradorite ((Ca, Na)(Al, Si)_{4}O_{8}) is a calcium-enriched feldspar mineral first identified in Labrador, Canada, which can display an iridescent effect (schiller).

Labradorite is an intermediate to calcic member of the plagioclase series. It has an anorthite percentage (%An) of between 50 and 70. The specific gravity ranges from 2.68 to 2.72. The streak is white, like most silicates. The refractive index ranges from 1.559 to 1.573 and twinning is common. As with all plagioclase members, the crystal system is triclinic, and three directions of cleavage are present, two of which are nearly at right angles and are more obvious, being of good to perfect quality (while the third direction is poor). It occurs as clear, white to gray, blocky to lath shaped grains in common mafic igneous rocks such as basalt and gabbro, as well as in anorthosites.

== Occurrence ==
The geological type area for labradorite is Paul's Island near the town of Nain in Labrador, Canada. It has also been reported in Poland, Norway, Finland and various other locations worldwide, with notable distribution in Madagascar, China, Australia, Slovakia and the United States.

Labradorite occurs in mafic igneous rocks and is the feldspar variety most common in basalt and gabbro. The uncommon anorthosite bodies are composed almost entirely of labradorite. It also is found in metamorphic amphibolites and as a detrital component of some sediments. Common mineral associates in igneous rocks include olivine, pyroxenes, amphiboles and magnetite.

== Labradorescence ==
Labradorite can display an iridescent optical effect (or schiller) known as labradorescence. The term labradorescence was coined by Ove Balthasar Bøggild, who defined it (labradorization) as follows:

Labradorization is the peculiar reflection of the light from submicroscopical planes orientated in one direction (rarely in two directions); these planes have never such a position that they can be expressed by simple indices, and they are not directly visible under the microscope.

Contributions to the understanding of the origin and cause of the effect were made by Robert Strutt, 4th Baron Rayleigh (1923), and by Bøggild (1924).

The cause of this optical phenomenon is phase exsolution lamellar structure, occurring in the Bøggild miscibility gap. The effect is visible when the lamellar separation is between 128 and 252 nm (5.0×10^{−6} and 9.9×10^{−6} in); the lamellae are not necessarily parallel; and the lamellar structure is found to lack long range order.

The lamellar separation only occurs in plagioclases of a certain composition; those of calcic labradorite (50–70% anorthite) and bytownite (formula: (Ca_{0.7-0.9},Na_{0.3-0.1})[Al(Al,Si)Si_{2}O_{8}], i.e., with an anorthite content of ~70 to 90%) particularly exemplify this. Another requirement for the lamellar separation is a very slow cooling of the rock containing the plagioclase. Slow cooling is required to allow the Ca, Na, Si, and Al ions to diffuse through the plagioclase and produce the lamellar separation. Therefore, not all labradorites exhibit labradorescence (they might not have the correct composition, cooled too quickly, or both), and not all plagioclases that exhibit labradorescence are labradorites (they may be bytownite).

== Spectrolite ==
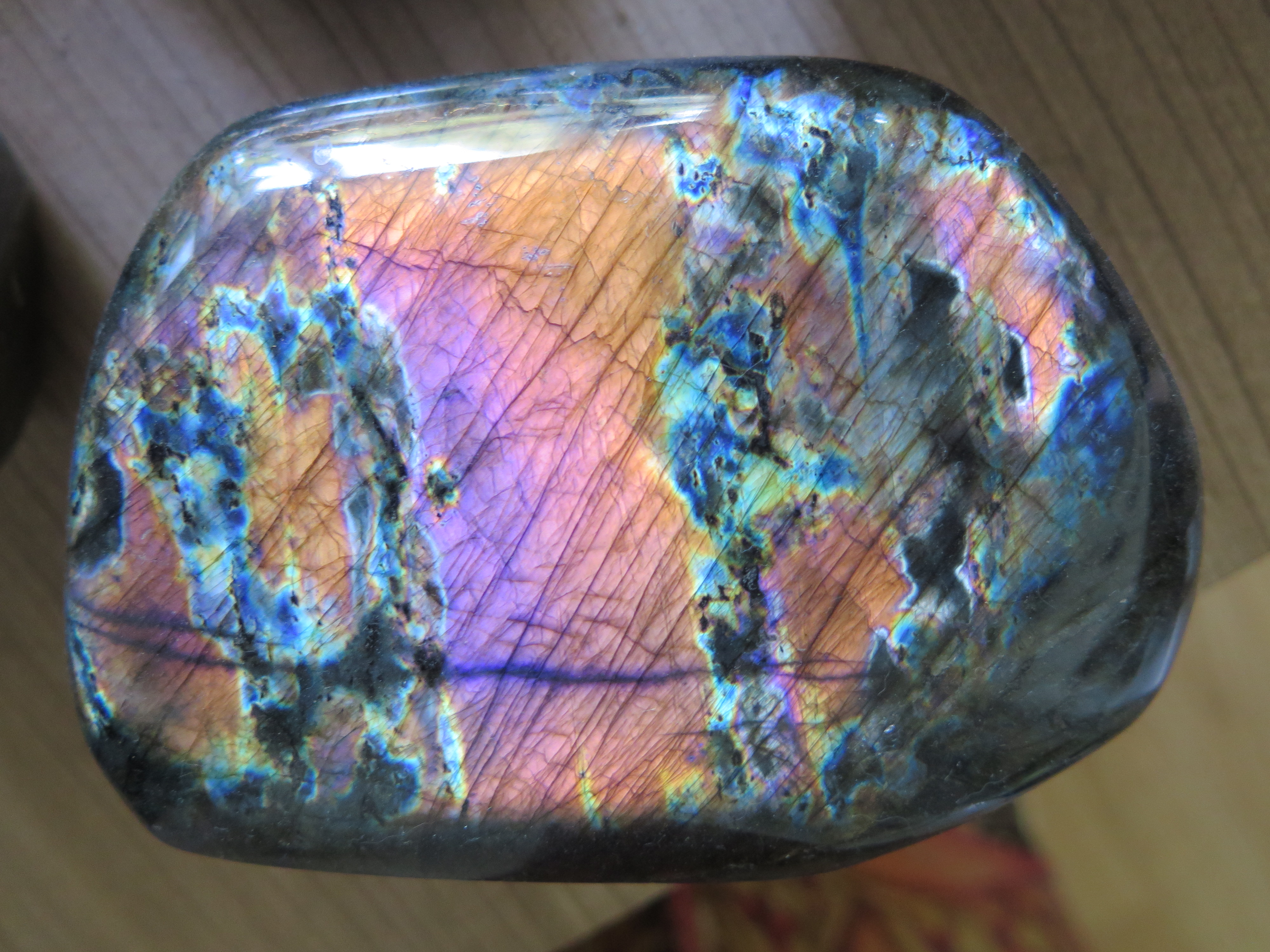
Spectrolite with purple, pink, and orange iridescence

Spectrolite is an uncommon variety of labradorite exhibiting a high degree of labradorescence. It exhibits a richer range of colors than other labradorites as for instance in Canada or Madagascar (which show mostly tones of blue-grey-green). Due to the unique colors mined in Finland, spectrolite has become a brand name for material mined only there. Sometimes spectrolite is incorrectly used to describe labradorite whenever a richer display of colors is present, regardless of locality: for example, labradorite with the spectrolite play of colors has sometimes described material from Madagascar.

Finnish geologist Aarne Laitakari (1890–1975) described spectrolite and sought its origin for years when his son Pekka discovered a deposit at Ylämaa in south-eastern Finland, while building the Salpa Line fortifications there in 1940.

The quarrying of spectrolite began after the Second World War and became a significant local industry. In 1973, the first workshop in Ylämaa began cutting and polishing spectrolite for jewels. After that, a gem center was established in Ylämaa with training for gem-cutting accompanied by an annual Gem and Mineral Show initiated by Esko Hämäläinen, mayor of Ylämaa municipality.

== Gallery ==
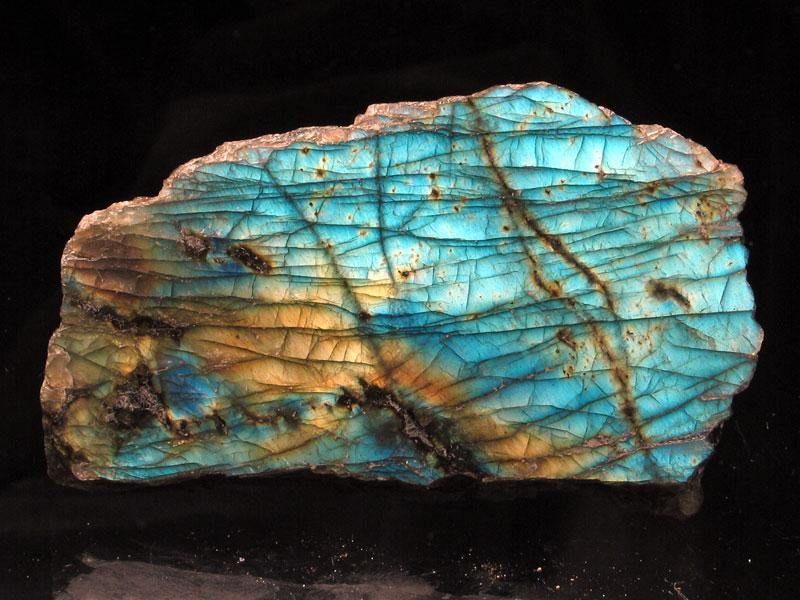
Polished block from Madagascar

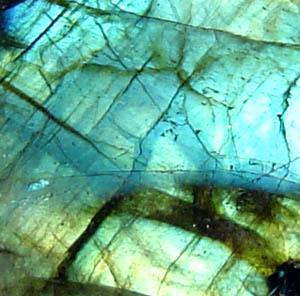
Detail of labradorite

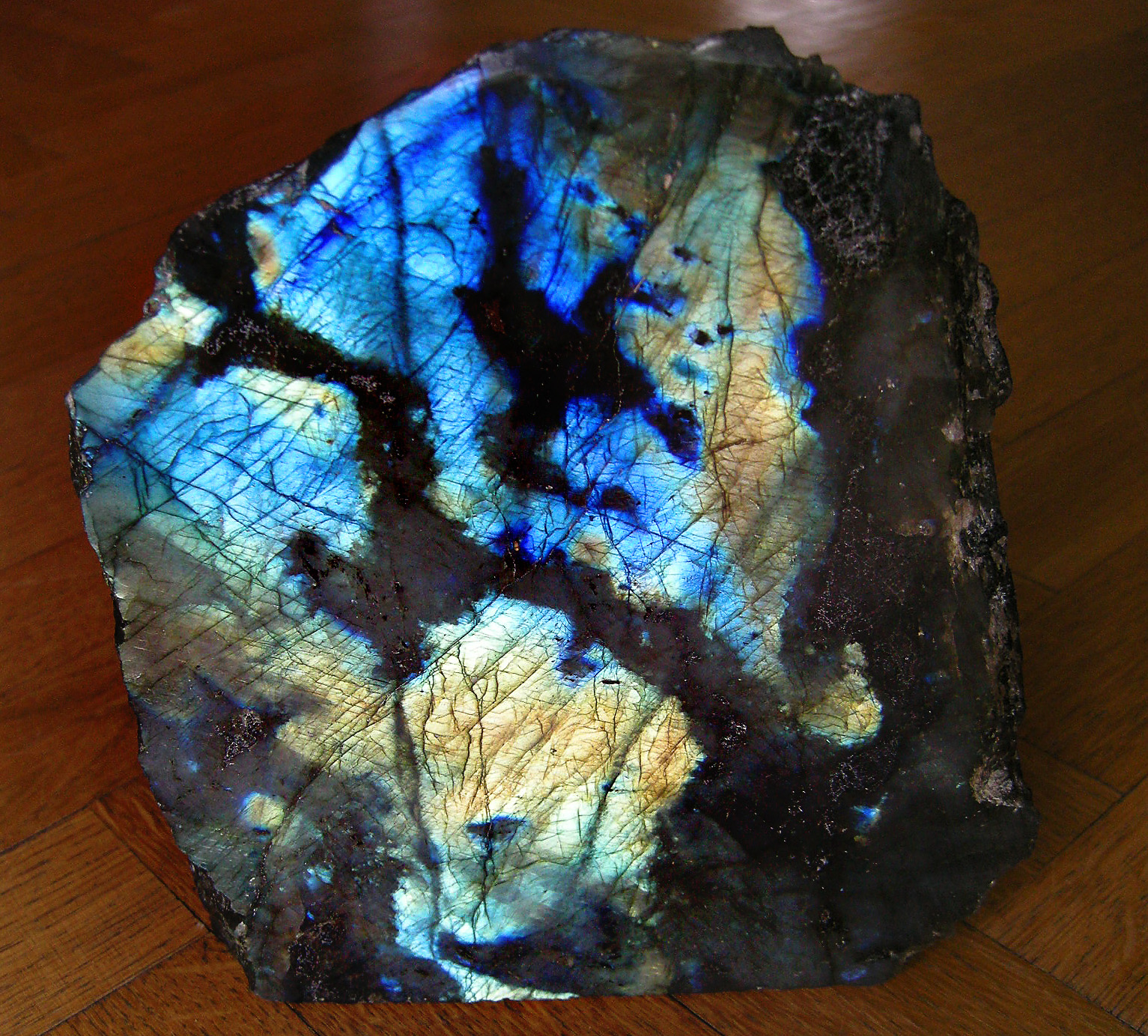
Polished labradorite 18 × 20 cm

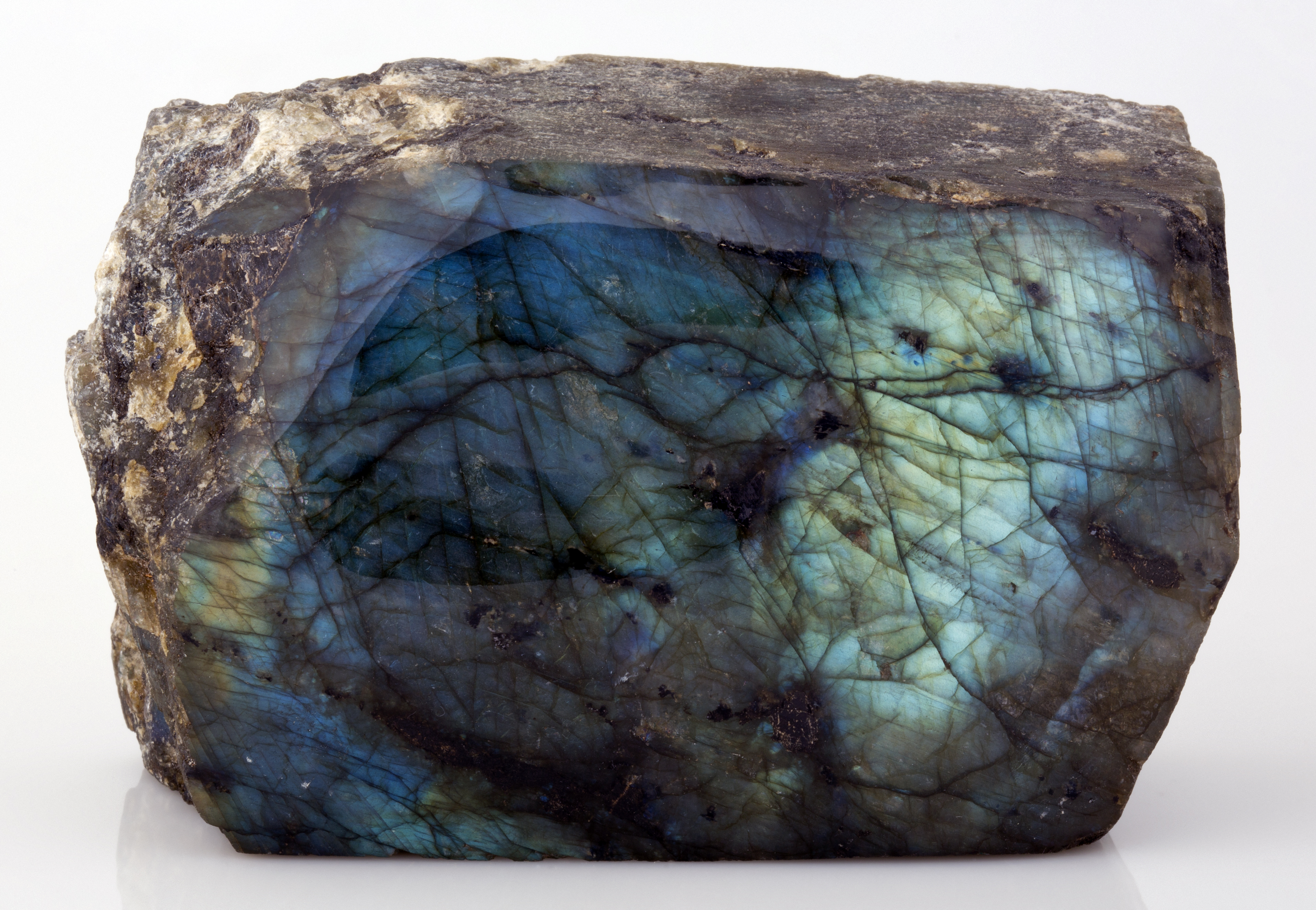
Polished labradorite from UCL Geology collections

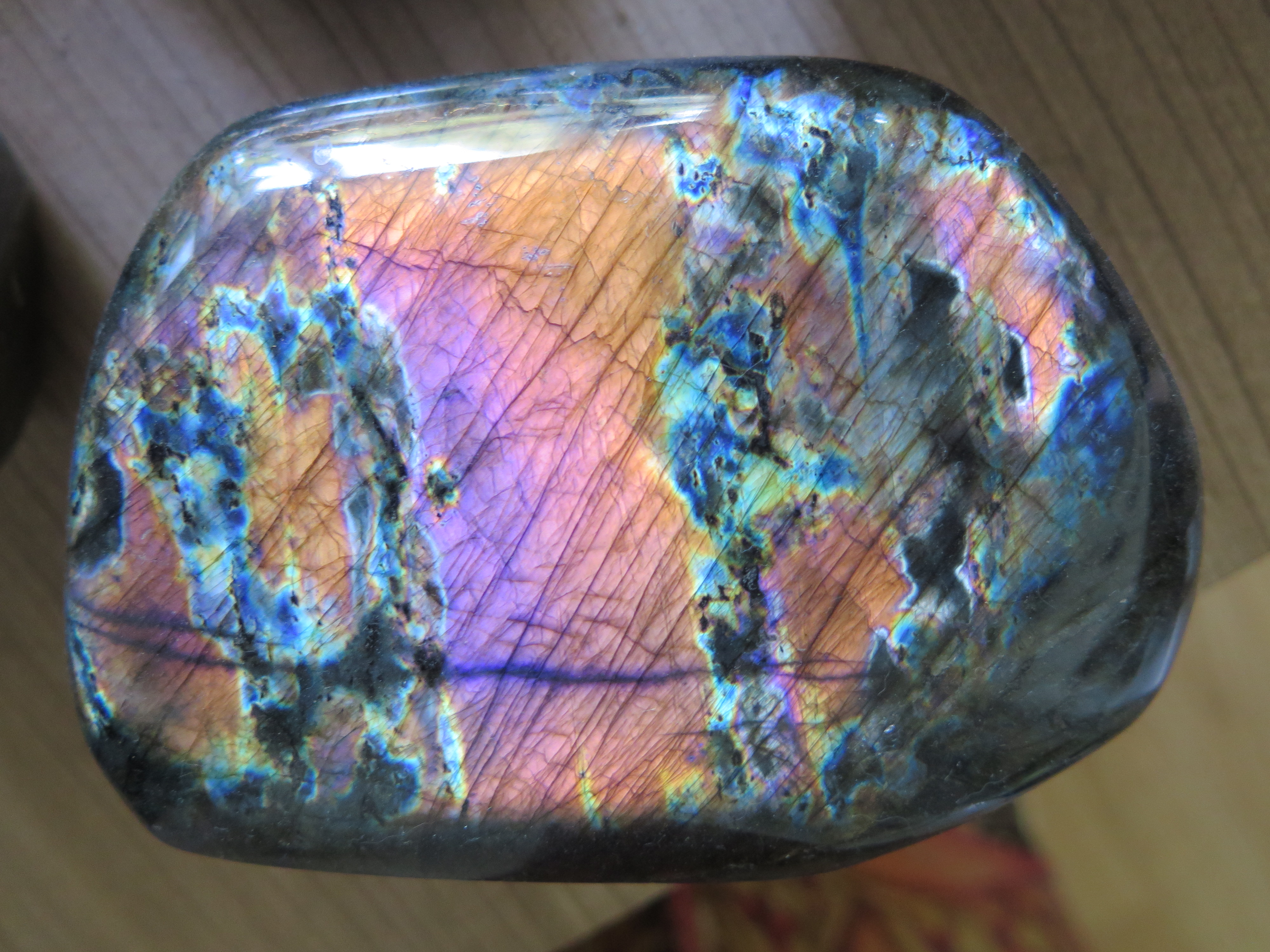
Labradorite with rare colors (spectrolite)

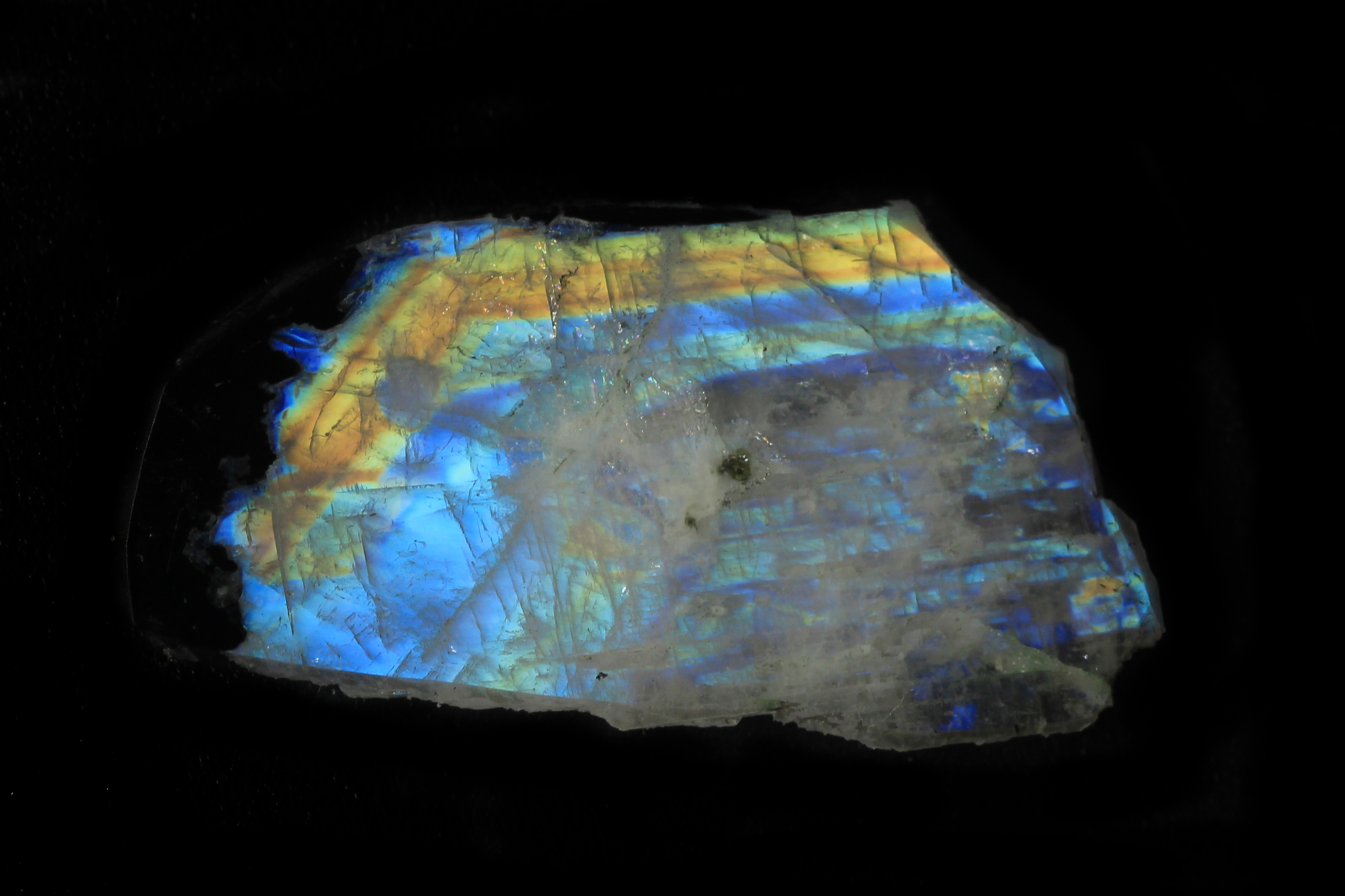
Polished labradorite

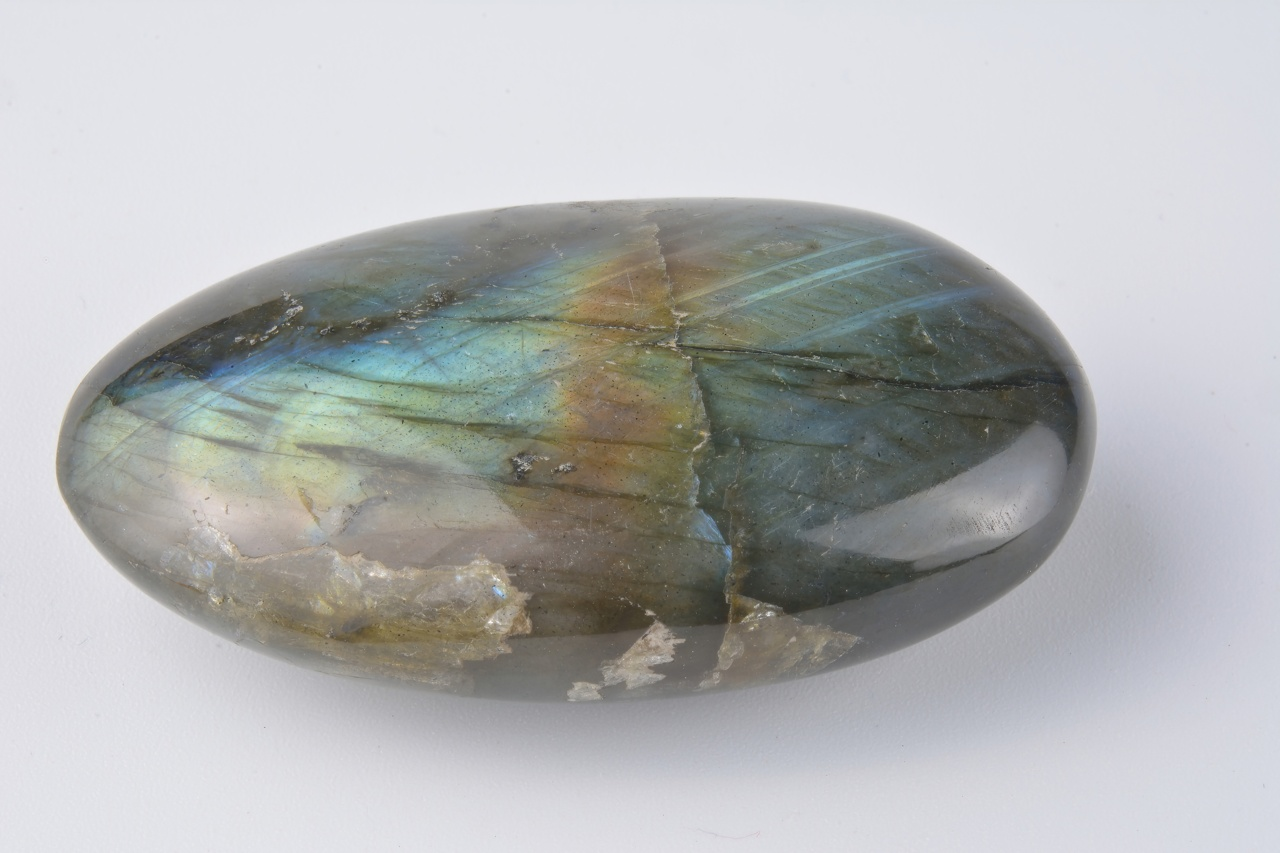
Iridescence effect on grey labradorite

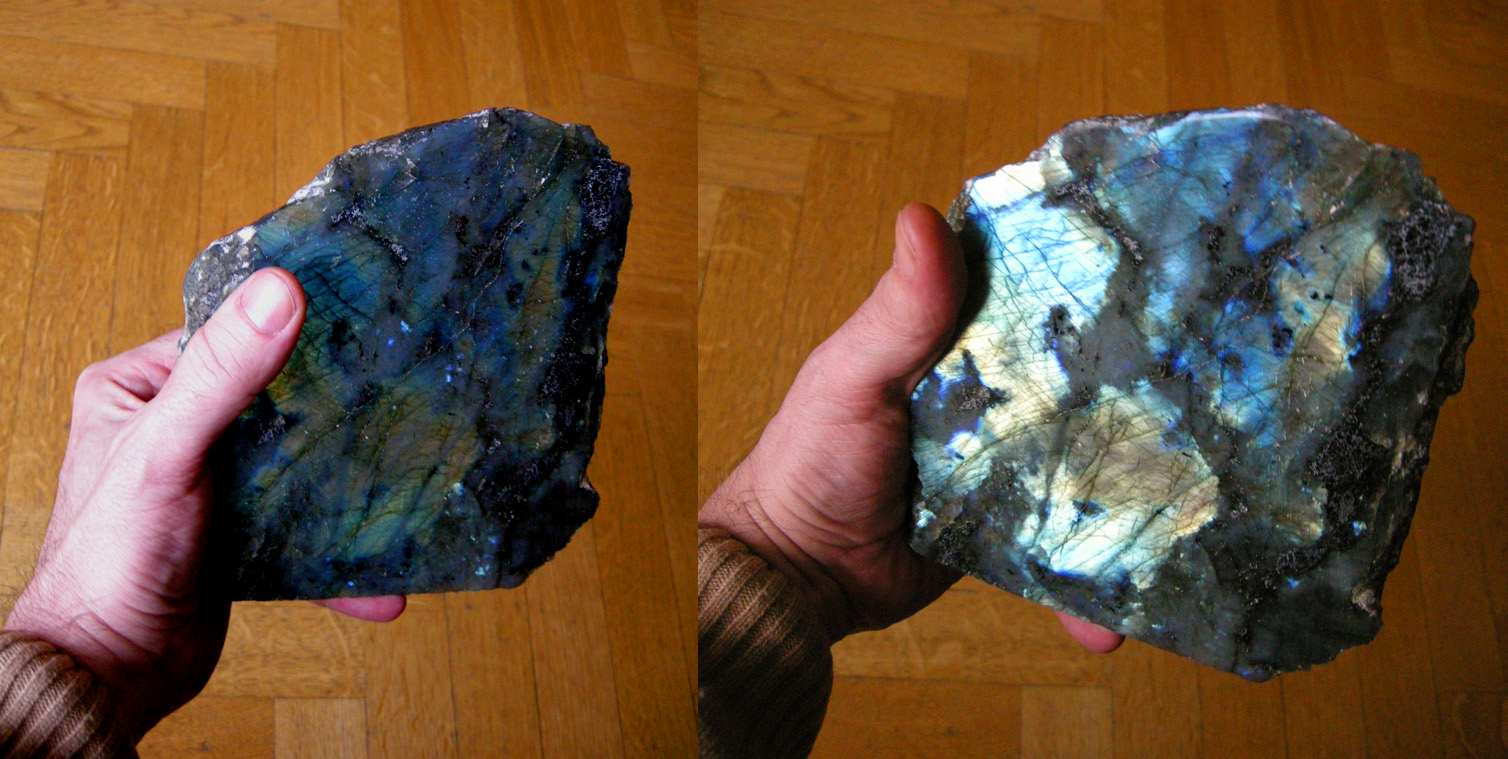
Labradorescence in labradorite

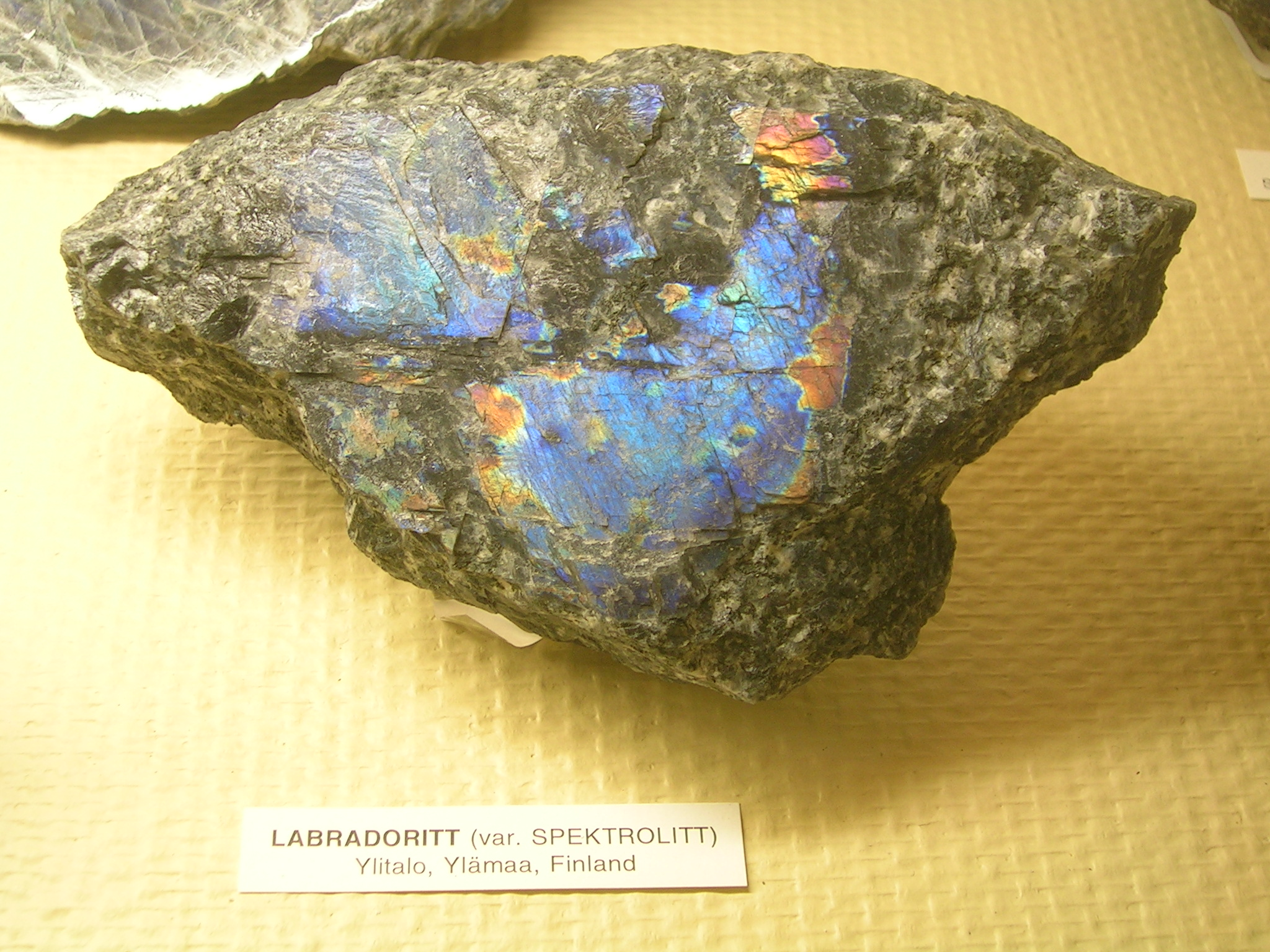
Spectrolite from Ylämaa, Finland

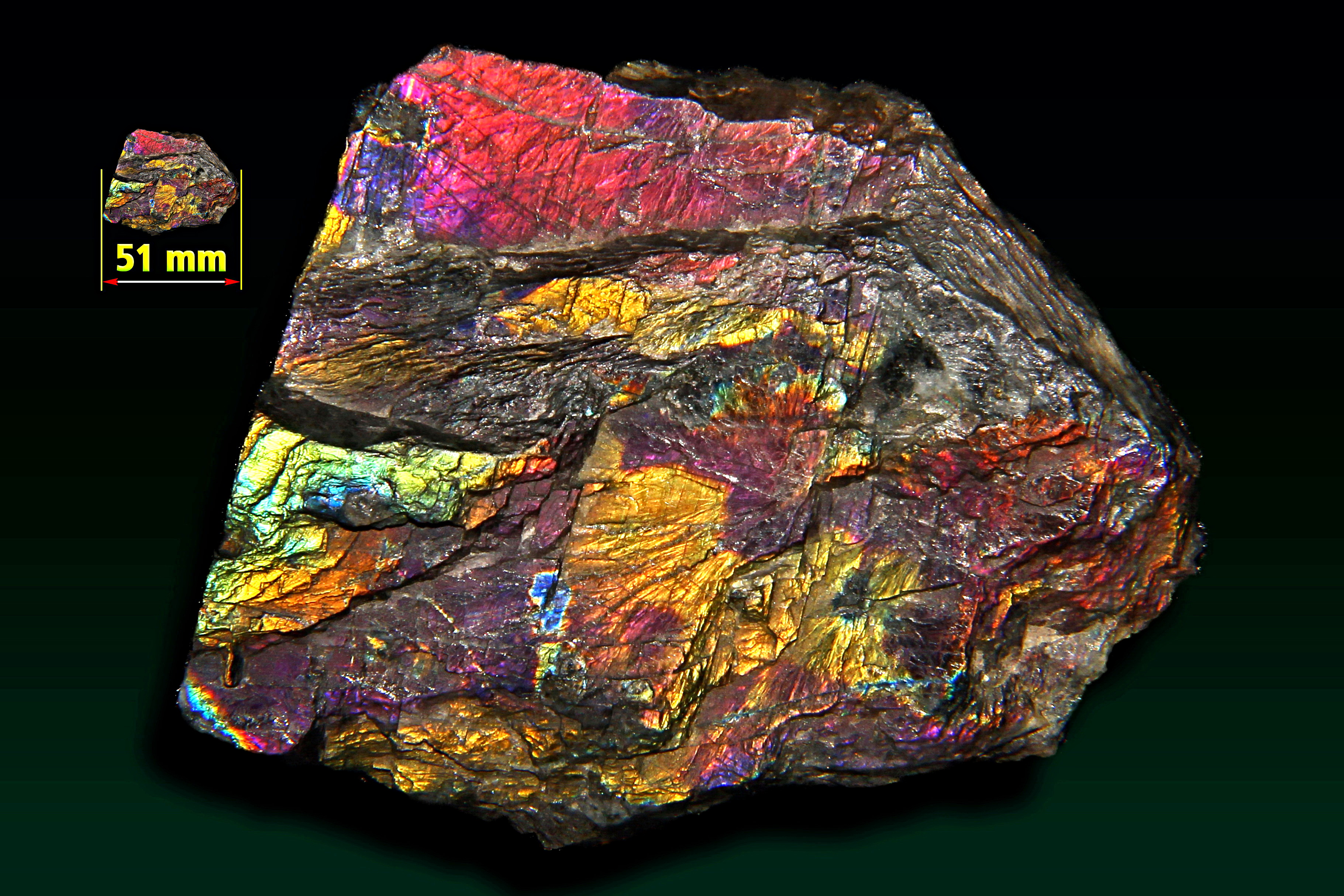
Spectrolite – Ylämaa, Finland.

Video of labradorescence in labradorite, visible as the angle of view changes

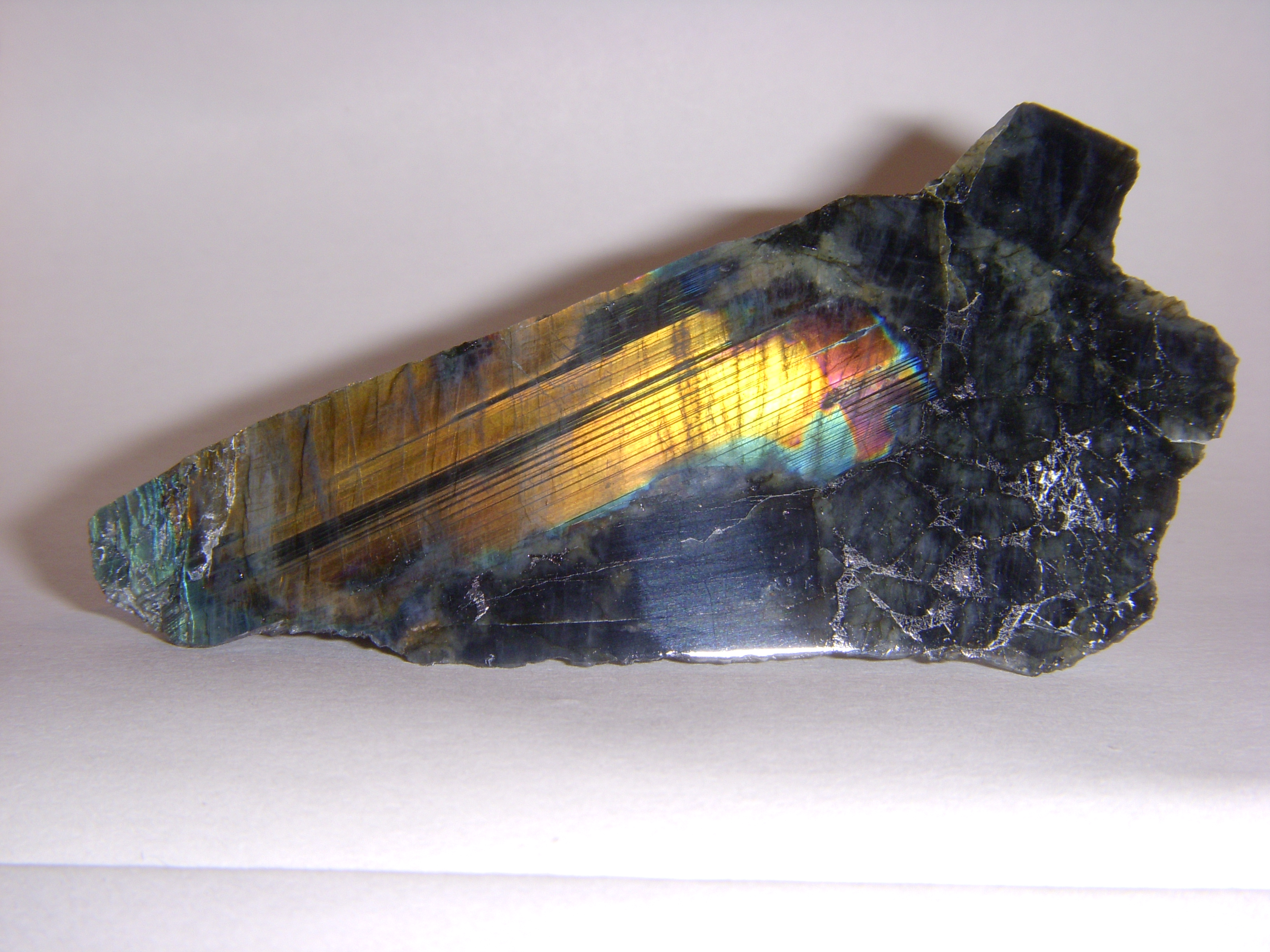
Polished spectrolite showing the color play

== See also ==
- Aventurescence
- Lapis lazuli
- Larvikite
- Opal
