= Old Perlican Island =

Island in Newfoundland and Labrador, Canada

Coordinates: 48°05′12″N 53°01′18″W

Old Perlican Island is an island in Newfoundland and Labrador, Canada, lying off the coast from the community of Old Perlican. It is the nesting ground of many Atlantic seabirds such as the Leach's storm-petrel and black-legged kittiwake. There is also a lighthouse built in the 1910s.

The island and surrounding bathymetry is a navigation barrier to ships with a draft over 2 fathoms entering the port of Old Perlican. Residents of Old Perlican use the island as a grazing ground for sheep in the spring and summer seasons.

The island is memorialized in Canadian poet Mabel Avery's poem The Lighthouse on Old Perlican Island.
