= North Star Island =

Island in Newfoundland and Labrador, Canada

Coordinates: 60°22′01.87″N 64°24′12.84″W

North Star Island is an island at the northern tip of Labrador in the province of Newfoundland and Labrador, Canada. This island, measuring only 186 meters by 57 meters, is the most northerly island in the province. It lies approximately 1.5 kilometers off the coast of Killiniq Island south of Cape Chidley.

== See also ==
- Geography of Newfoundland and Labrador
