= Venison Island =

Island off the coast of Labrador

Venison
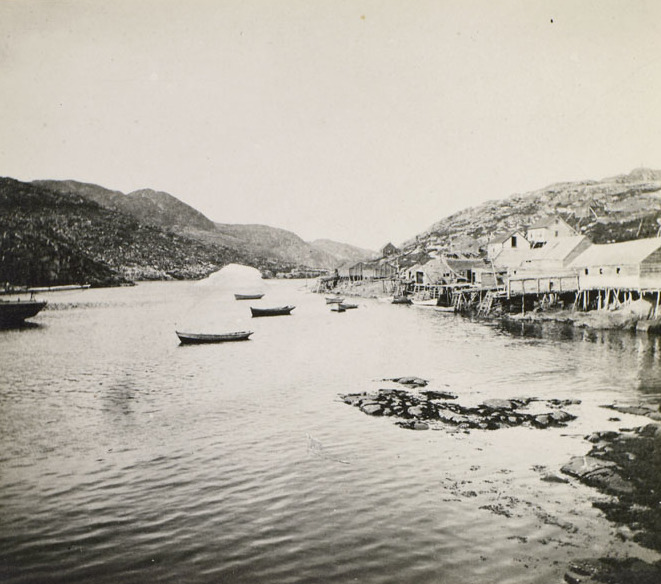
- Venison Island, as photographed by Edith Watson in August 1913

- Location within Newfoundland and Labrador

Geography
- Location: Labrador Sea
- Coordinates: 52.970°N 55.775°W
- Area: 1 km^{2} (0.39 sq mi)
- Highest elevation: 68 m (223 ft)

Administration
- Canada
- Province: Newfoundland and Labrador

Venison Island is an island off of the coast of Labrador.

The island is separated from Stony Island by a narrow channel called Venison Tickle and measures 1200 m by 550 m. The island once had a busy wharf and fishing community, a wireless telegraph station (code VI) and a population of 36 year-round residents in 1901.
