= Pouch Island, Newfoundland and Labrador =

Coordinates: 49.167°N 53.474°W

Pouch Island was once a fishing community on isolated island in Newfoundland, in northern Bonavista Bay situated about 5 km east of Wesleyville. The settlement is now abandoned.

== History ==
The earliest reference to Pouch Island was in an 1803 parish record which records a John Dick living on the island. There are also records from missionaries who visited the area to perform services. For example, a missionary visited in 1830 and baptized eight people with the names of Dick and Sainsbury. Later names that came to Pouch Island also included Cooze and Dyke. The people on the island relied on the cod fishery and eventually became involved in the seal fishery. In the 1836 Census Pouch Island is recorded with a population of 36. The last written record that documents settlement on the island was the baptism of Tabitha Dyke in 1863, afterwards people began moving off the island. The residents of Pouch Island mainly moved to Newtown and Pool's Island, by 1869 the island was vacated.

== Sealing ==
Pouch Island was a small and isolated community but was settled for its access to fishing grounds. When the seal fishery took off in northern Bonavista Bay, Pouch Island, even though it was relatively small, became involved as well. There was one fishing room built on the island, 'Dick's Room', which was built in 1803. In 1845 there were 6 sealing nets on the island, and in 1857 there was still 1 net there. By the next Census, 1869, the island was abandoned.

== Census Information ==
	1836	1845
population	36	26
inhabited houses	4	4
total boats	3	4
Church of England	34	26
Roman Catholic	2	-
sealing nets	-	6
barrels potatoes produced	80.5	-

== See also ==
- List of communities in Newfoundland and Labrador
