= Pollard's Point, Newfoundland and Labrador =

Pollard's Point
- Local service district / designated place
- Location of Pollard's Point Pollard's Point (Canada)
- Coordinates: 49.743°N 56.908°W
- Country: Canada
- Province: Newfoundland and Labrador
- Region: Newfoundland
- Census division: 5
- Census subdivision: G

Government
  - Type: Unincorporated

Area
  - Land: 16.85 km^{2} (6.51 sq mi)

Population (2016)
  - Total: 306
- Time zone: UTC−03:30 (NST)
  - Summer (DST): UTC−02:30 (NDT)
- Area code: 709

Pollard's Point is a local service district and designated place in the Canadian province of Newfoundland and Labrador.

== History ==
The post office was established in 1966.

== Geography ==
Pollard's Point is in Newfoundland within Subdivision G of Division No. 5. It is approximately 100 km (62 mi) northeast of Deer Lake.

== Demographics ==
As a designated place in the 2016 Census of Population conducted by Statistics Canada, Pollard's Point recorded a population of 306 living in 148 of its 181 total private dwellings, a change of 21.4% from its 2011 population of 252. With a land area of 16.85 km^{2} (6.51 sq mi), it had a population density of 18.2/km^{2} (47.0/sq mi) in 2016.

== Government ==
Pollard's Point is a local service district (LSD) that is governed by a committee responsible for the provision of certain services to the community. The chair of the LSD committee is Edine Gossett.

== Education ==
Main River Academy is in Pollard's Point.

== See also ==
- List of communities in Newfoundland and Labrador
- List of designated places in Newfoundland and Labrador
- List of local service districts in Newfoundland and Labrador
