= South Wolf Island =

Island in Newfoundland and Labrador, Canada

- Location within Newfoundland and Labrador

Geography
- Coordinates: 53°40′N 55°55′W
- Highest elevation: 94.8 m (311 ft)

Administration
- Canada
- Province: Newfoundland and Labrador

South Wolf Island is the largest of a small group of uninhabited islands called the Wolf Islands off of the east coast of Labrador. The group stretches 4.5 km from north to south.

South Wolf Island is in the centre of the group and has a high flat range with a conical boulder at the summit, at 94.8 m. Its south end has a cove which can provide shelter to small vessels.
