= Jackson's Arm =

Coordinates: 49°52′N 56°47′W

- Town
- Interactive map of Jackson's Arm
- Country: Canada
- Province: Newfoundland and Labrador

Population (2021)
  - Total: 277
- Time zone: UTC-3:30 (Newfoundland Time)
  - Summer (DST): UTC-2:30 (Newfoundland Daylight)
- Area code: 709
- Highways: Route 420

Jackson's Arm is a town in the Canadian province of Newfoundland and Labrador, located on White Bay. It was settled by John Wicks of Christchurch, England, around 1870. The Post Office was established in 1892 and the first Postmistress was Belinda Peddle. The town had a population of 435 in 1956 and 277 as of the 2021 Canadian census. The primary industry of the town is fishing. In 2012, the local fish plant closed.

== Demographics ==
In the 2021 Census of Population conducted by Statistics Canada, Jackson's Arm had a population of 277 living in 125 of its 169 total private dwellings, a change of −2.5% from its 2016 population of 284. With a land area of 7.07 km^{2} (2.73 sq mi), it had a population density of 39.2/km^{2} (101.5/sq mi) in 2021.

== See also ==
- List of cities and towns in Newfoundland and Labrador
- Newfoundland outport
