= White Bay (Newfoundland and Labrador) =

Natural bay in Newfoundland, Canada

Coordinates: 50.06°N 56.50°W

Location of White Bay in Newfoundland

White Bay is a large bay in Newfoundland, Canada.
