= 2024 Baie Verte-Green Bay provincial by-election =

By-election in Newfoundland and Labrador, Canada

← 2021	May 27, 2024	2025 →

Riding of Baie Verte-Green Bay
- Turnout: 56.49% (▲14.39)
	First party	Second party
	PC	LIB
Candidate	Lin Paddock	Owen Burt
Party	Progressive Conservative	Liberal
Last election	47.94%	52.06%
Popular vote	4,271	1,035
Percentage	79.06%	19.16%
Swing	▲31.13	▼32.90
MHA before election
Brian Warr
Liberal
Elected MHA
Lin Paddock
Progressive Conservative

A by-election was held in the provincial riding of Baie Verte-Green Bay in Newfoundland and Labrador on May 27, 2024, to elect a new member of the Newfoundland and Labrador House of Assembly following the resignation of Liberal MHA Brian Warr. Advance polling opened on May 21. Lin Paddock of the Progressive Conservative Party of Newfoundland and Labrador won the election.

== Candidates ==
Three candidates registered for the election:

- Owen Burt (Liberal) - federal Conservative.
- Riley Harnett (NDP)
- Lin Paddock (PC) - Worked in the Canadian Armed Forces. Criticized for saying "we need to recruit in areas that love this [area], places like Germany where they adore the outdoors, not India and Pakistan where they will come here and then go to Toronto" during a debate. Later said it was a poor choice of words.

== Results ==
Newfoundland and Labrador provincial by-election, May 27, 2024 Resignation of Brian Warr
Party	Candidate	Votes	%	±%
Progressive Conservative	Lin Paddock	4,271	79.06	+31.13
Liberal	Owen Burt	1,035	19.16	-32.90
New Democratic	Riley Harnett	96	1.78	
Total valid votes		5,402		
Total rejected ballots				
Turnout			56.49	+14.39
Eligible voters		9,562		
Progressive Conservative gain from Liberal		Swing		+32.01

== 2021 result ==
2021 Newfoundland and Labrador general election: Baie Verte-Green Bay
Party	Candidate	Votes	%	±%
Liberal	Brian Warr	2,158	52.06	+2.34
Progressive Conservative	Lin Paddock	1,987	47.94	+14.80
Total valid votes		4,145	99.38	
Total rejected ballots		26	0.62	+0.22
Turnout		4,171	42.11	-17.85
Eligible voters		9,906		
Liberal hold		Swing		-6.23
Source(s) "Officially Nominated Candidates General Election 2021" (PDF). Elections Newfoundland and Labrador. "NL Election 2021 General Election Report" (PDF).

== Results by Community ==
Poll Numbers	Community	Paddock	Burt	Harnett	Vote Total
1	Brighton	81	4	2	87
2-4	Triton	342	51	3	396
5	Pilley's Island	107	12	4	123
6	Lushes Bight-Beaumont-Beaumont North	52	13	1	66
7-8	Roberts Arm	199	18	5	222
9	Port Anson and Miles Cove	100	8	0	108
10-11	South Brook	191	37	4	232
12	Harry's Harbour	24	17	1	42
13	Jackson's Cove, Silverdale, Langdon's Cove and Nickey's Nose Cove	29	13	2	44
14	Rattling Brook	23	26	0	49
15-16	King's Point	159	139	4	302
17-24	Springdale	460	168	13	641
25	Little Bay, Coffee Cove, and St. Patricks	52	9	1	62
26	Beachside	44	8	1	53
27	Sheppardville, Birchy Lake East, and Sheffield Lake	38	9	1	48
28	Westport and Purbeck's Cove	98	4	1	103
29	Middle Arm	143	15	2	160
30	Smith's Harbour	47	5	1	53
31	Burlington	105	6	3	114
32	Fleur de Lys	73	31	2	106
33	Coachman's Cove	32	19	2	53
34-36	Baie Verte	221	59	5	285
37	Seal Cove	64	17	4	85
38	Wild Cove	20	2	0	22
39	Ming's Bight	73	14	1	88
40	Woodstock	58	9	1	68
41	Pacquet	52	8	2	62
42	Nipper's Harbour	23	3	0	26
43	Brent's Cove	46	6	1	53
44	Harbour Round	42	3	0	45
45	Shoe Cove	51	16	1	68
46-47	LaScie and Tilt Cove	144	44	5	193
Advance		612	137	12	761
Special Ballots		466	105	11	582
TOTAL		4,271	1,035	96	5,402

== See also ==
- List of Newfoundland and Labrador by-elections
