= Newfoundland and Labrador Route 390 =

Highway in Newfoundland and Labrador, Canada

Route 390
- Springdale Road

Route information
- Maintained by Newfoundland and Labrador Department of Transportation and Infrastructure
- Length: 11.0 km (6.8 mi)

Major junctions
- South end: Route 1 (TCH)
- Route 391 to King's Point; Route 392 to Beachside
- North end: Main Street in Springdale

Location
- Country: Canada
- Province: Newfoundland and Labrador

Highway system
- Highways in Newfoundland and Labrador
← Route 382	→ Route 391

Route 390, also known as Springdale Road, is a highway in the central portion of Newfoundland in the Canadian province of Newfoundland and Labrador. It is a very short route, running for only 11.0 kilometres (6.8 mi), with its only community, Springdale, as its terminus. Its branch routes, Route 391 (Harry's Harbour Road) and Route 392 (Beachside Road), run for a much longer distance.

== Route description ==
Route 390 begins in a rural area at an intersection with Route 1 (Trans-Canada Highway) and it heads northeast to cross Indian Brook and have an intersection with Route 391 (Harry's Harbour Road). Springdale Airport (not a scheduled destination) can be accessed from the highways southern terminus by traveling 1 kilometre east on Route 1. The highway heads northeast through wooded areas for a few kilometres, paralleling the Indian Brook, to enter the Springdale town limits and have an intersection with Route 392 (Beachside Road). Route 390 passes through some business districts and neighbourhoods, where it passes by George Huxter Memorial Park, before entering downtown and coming to an end at a Y-Intersection with Main Street in downtown.

== Major intersections ==
Location	km	mi	Destinations	Notes
	0.0	0.0	Route 1 (TCH) – Deer Lake, Grand Falls-Windsor	Southern terminus; provides access to Springdale Airport (not a scheduled destination)
	2.6	1.6	Route 391 north (Harry's Harbour Road) – King's Point, Harry's Harbour	Southern terminus of Route 391
Springdale	7.1	4.4	Route 392 north (Beachside Road) – Little Bay, Beachside	Southern terminus of Route 392
Springdale	7.4	4.6	George Huxter Memorial Park main entrance	Access road into park
Springdale	11.0	6.8	Main Street	Northern terminus
1.000 mi = 1.609 km; 1.000 km = 0.621 mi
