= Newfoundland and Labrador Route 392 =

Highway in Newfoundland and Labrador, Canada

Route 392
- Beachside Road

Route information
- Maintained by Newfoundland and Labrador Department of Transportation and Infrastructure
- Length: 26.0 km (16.2 mi)

Major junctions
- South end: Route 390 in Springdale
- North end: Southern Arm

Location
- Country: Canada
- Province: Newfoundland and Labrador

Highway system
- Highways in Newfoundland and Labrador
← Route 391	→ Route 401

Route 392, also known as Beachside Road, is a 26.0-kilometre-long (16.2 mi) north–south highway on the northern coast of Newfoundland in the Canadian province of Newfoundland and Labrador. It connects the town of Beachside, along with some other communities, with the town of Springdale and Route 390 (Springdale Road).

== Route description ==
Route 392 begins on the western side of Springdale at an intersection with Route 390 and it heads northeast to leave town and pass through rural hilly terrain for several kilometres, where it passes by a lake before going through St. Patrick's. The highway now begins to follow the coastline as it passes through Coffee Cove and Beachside, where the road turns to gravel for the rest of its length. Route 392 now enters Southern Arm and comes to an end shortly thereafter at the community's harbour.

== Major intersections ==
Location	km	mi	Destinations	Notes
Springdale	0.0	0.0	Route 390 (Springdale Road) to Route 1 (TCH) – King's Point, Downtown	Southern terminus
Southern Arm	26.0	16.2	Dead End	Northern terminus
1.000 mi = 1.609 km; 1.000 km = 0.621 mi
