= Newfoundland and Labrador Route 391 =

Highway in Newfoundland and Labrador, Canada

Route 391
- Harry's Harbour Road

Route information
- Maintained by Newfoundland and Labrador Department of Transportation and Infrastructure
- Length: 37.2 km (23.1 mi)

Major junctions
- South end: Route 390 near Springdale
- North end: Harry's Harbour

Location
- Country: Canada
- Province: Newfoundland and Labrador

Highway system
- Highways in Newfoundland and Labrador
← Route 390	→ Route 392

Route 391, also known as Harry's Harbour Road, is a 37.2-kilometre-long (23.1 mi) north–south highway on the northern coast of Newfoundland in the Canadian Province of Newfoundland and Labrador. It connects the towns of Harry's Harbour and King's Point with Springdale and the Trans-Canada Highway (Route 1), via Route 390.

== Route description ==
Route 391 begins at an intersection with Route 390 (Springdale Road) west of Springdale, just 2.5 kilometres (1.6 mi) shy of its intersection with Route 1. It winds its way northward through rural, wooded, hilly terrain for several kilometres to pass through King's Point, where it has an intersection with a local road leading to downtown and Rattling Brook. The highway now begins following the coastline as it passes through the town of Jackson's Cove-Langdon's Cove-Silverdale, with Route 391 passing through the Silverdale and Langdon's Cove parts of town while also having two intersections with a loop road to Jackson's Cove. Route 391 now passes through Nickey's Nose Cove before entering Harry's Harbour and coming to an end at a large five-fingered fork in the road.

== Major intersections ==
Location	km	mi	Destinations	Notes
	0.0	0.0	Route 390 (Springdale Road) to Route 1 (TCH) – Springdale, Beachside	Southern terminus
King's Point	11.4	7.1	Main Street (Route 391-10) - Downtown, Rattling Brook	
Jackson's Cove-Langdon's Cove-Silverdale	31.3	19.4	Jackson's Cove Road (Route 391-11) - Jackson Cove	
Jackson's Cove-Langdon's Cove-Silverdale	33.8	21.0	Langdon's Cove Road (Route 391-14) - Langdon's Cove, Jackson Cove	
Harry's Harbour	37.2	23.1	Fork in the road	Northern terminus
1.000 mi = 1.609 km; 1.000 km = 0.621 mi
