= Baie Verte-Green Bay =

Provincial electoral district in Newfoundland and Labrador, Canada

Coordinates: 49.8117°N 56.2738°W

Newfoundland and Labrador electoral district

Provincial electoral district
- Legislature: Newfoundland and Labrador House of Assembly
MHA
Lin Paddock
Progressive Conservative
- District created: 2015
- First contested: 2007
- Last contested: 2025

Demographics
- Population (2011): 13,773
- Electors (2011): 8,067
- Census division(s): Division No. 5, Division No. 6, Division No. 8
- Census subdivision(s): Baie Verte, Beachside, Brent's Cove, Brighton, Burlington, Coachman's Cove, Division No. 5, Subd. E, Division No. 6, Subd. C, Division No. 8, Subd. A, Division No. 8, Subd. C, Division No. 8, Subd. C, Division No. 8, Subd. O, Division No. 8, Subd. P, Fleur de Lys, King's Point, LaScie, Little Bay, Little Bay Islands, Lushes Bight-Beaumont-Beaumont North, Middle Arm, Miles Cove, Ming's Bight, Nippers Harbour, Pacquet, Pilley's Island, Port Anson, Robert's Arm, Seal Cove (White Bay), South Brook, Springdale, Tilt Cove, Triton, Westport, Woodstock

Baie Verte-Green Bay (formerly Baie Verte-Springdale) is a provincial electoral district for the House of Assembly of Newfoundland and Labrador, Canada. As of 2011 it has 8,067 eligible voters. The district was redistributed in 2015. It is currently represented by Lin Paddock who won the seat in a by-election on May 27, 2024.

It contains the communities of: Baie Verte, Beachside, Brent's Cove, Brighton, Burlington, Coachman's Cove, Fleur de Lys, King's Point, LaScie, Little Bay, Little Bay Islands, Lushes Bight-Beaumont-Beaumont North, Middle Arm, Miles Cove, Ming's Bight, Nippers Harbour, Pacquet, Pilley's Island, Port Anson, Robert's Arm, Seal Cove, South Brook, Springdale, Tilt Cove, Triton, Westport, Woodstock, Harbour Round, Purbeck's Cove, Wild Cove, Sheppardville, St. Patricks, Round Harbour, Shoe Cove, Smith's Harbour, Snooks Arm, Harry's Harbour, Jackson's Cove-Langdon's Cove, Silverdale, and Rattling Brook.

The economy depends heavily on fishing and sealing. While sealing has done well in recent years, the ground fishery remains poor. Mining operations are taking place in Baie Verte and King's Point, and mineral exploration continues in the area.

The riding was created in 1975 out of parts of White Bay North, White Bay South, and Green Bay.

The district has voted Progressive Conservative since 1982, with the exception of a by-election and the 2015, 2019 and 2021 elections. The district's borders shifted slightly south and west in the new redistribution, taking in small parts of the Humber Valley and the former Grand Falls-Buchans districts.

== Members of the House of Assembly ==
The district has elected the following members of the House of Assembly:

Assembly	Years	Member	Party
Baie Verte - White Bay
37th	1975–1979	Tom Rideout	Liberal
38th	1979–1980	Tom Rideout	Liberal
38th	1980–1982	Tom Rideout	Progressive Conservative
39th	1982–1985	Tom Rideout	Progressive Conservative
40th	1985–1989	Tom Rideout	Progressive Conservative
41st	1989–1991	Tom Rideout	Progressive Conservative
41st	1991–1993	Harold Small	Liberal
42nd	1993–1996	Paul Shelley	Progressive Conservative
Baie Verte
43rd	1996–1999	Paul Shelley	Progressive Conservative
44th	1999–2003	Paul Shelley	Progressive Conservative
45th	2003–2007	Paul Shelley	Progressive Conservative
Baie Verte - Springdale
46th	2007–2008	Tom Rideout	Progressive Conservative
46th	2008–2011	Kevin Pollard	Progressive Conservative
47th	2011–2015	Kevin Pollard	Progressive Conservative
Baie Verte - Green Bay
48th	2015–2019	Brian Warr	Liberal
49th	2019–2021	Brian Warr	Liberal
50th	2021–2024	Brian Warr	Liberal
50th	2024-2025	Lin Paddock	Progressive Conservative
51st	2025–present	Lin Paddock	Progressive Conservative

== Election results ==
Graph of election results (minor parties that never got 2% of the vote or did not run consistently are omitted) View source data.

=== Baie Verte-Green Bay ===
2025 Newfoundland and Labrador general election
Party	Candidate	Votes	%	±%
Progressive Conservative	Lin Paddock	3,643	74.42	-4.64
Liberal	Owen Burt	1,013	20.69	+1.54
New Democratic	Sarah Hillier	239	4.88	+3.11
Total valid votes		4,895		
Total rejected ballots				
Turnout				
Eligible voters				
Progressive Conservative hold		Swing		-3.09

Newfoundland and Labrador provincial by-election, May 27, 2024 Resignation of Brian Warr
Party	Candidate	Votes	%	±%
Progressive Conservative	Lin Paddock	4,271	79.06	+31.13
Liberal	Owen Burt	1,035	19.16	-32.90
New Democratic	Riley Harnett	96	1.78	
Total valid votes		5,402	99.63	
Total rejected ballots		20	0.37	-0.25
Turnout		5,422	56.47	+14.36
Eligible voters		9,602		
Progressive Conservative gain from Liberal		Swing		+32.01

2021 Newfoundland and Labrador general election
Party	Candidate	Votes	%	±%
Liberal	Brian Warr	2,158	52.06	+2.34
Progressive Conservative	Lin Paddock	1,987	47.94	+14.80
Total valid votes		4,145	99.38	
Total rejected ballots		26	0.62	+0.22
Turnout		4,171	42.11	-17.85
Eligible voters		9,906		
Liberal hold		Swing		-6.23
Source(s) "Officially Nominated Candidates General Election 2021" (PDF). Elections Newfoundland and Labrador. "NL Election 2021 General Election Report" (PDF).

2019 Newfoundland and Labrador general election
Party	Candidate	Votes	%	±%
Liberal	Brian Warr	2,809	49.73	-6.37
Progressive Conservative	Neville Robinson	1,872	33.14	-6.23
NL Alliance	Ben Callahan	968	17.14	
Total valid votes		5,649	99.59	
Total rejected ballots		23	0.41	+0.07
Turnout		5,672	59.96	+4.13
Eligible voters		9,460		
Liberal hold		Swing		-0.07

2015 Newfoundland and Labrador general election
Party	Candidate	Votes	%	±%
Liberal	Brian Warr	3,130	56.09	+18.31
Progressive Conservative	Kevin Pollard	2,197	39.37	-13.41
New Democratic	Matt Howse	253	4.53	-4.90
Total valid votes		5,580	99.66	
Total rejected ballots		19	0.34	+0.09
Turnout		5,599	55.83	-3.96
Eligible voters		10,029		
Liberal gain from Progressive Conservative		Swing		+15.86

=== Baie Verte-Springdale ===
2011 Newfoundland and Labrador general election
Party	Candidate	Votes	%	±%
Progressive Conservative	Kevin Pollard	2,552	52.78	-3.25
Liberal	Neil Ward	1,827	37.79	+2.54
New Democratic	Tim Howse	456	9.43	+0.71
Total valid votes		4,835	99.75	
Total rejected ballots		12	0.25	-0.09
Turnout		4,847	59.79	+16.31
Electors on the lists		8,107	–	
Progressive Conservative hold		Swing		-2.89

Newfoundland and Labrador provincial by-election, August 27, 2008 Resignation of Tom Rideout
Party	Candidate	Votes	%	±%
Progressive Conservative	Kevin Pollard	1,979	56.03	-19.48
Liberal	Shaun Lane	1,245	35.25	+17.46
New Democratic	Tim Howse	308	8.72	+2.01
Total valid votes		3,532	99.66	
Total rejected ballots		12	0.34	-0.15
Turnout		3,544	43.47	-12.31
Electors on the lists		8,152	–	
Progressive Conservative hold		Swing		-18.47

2007 Newfoundland and Labrador general election
Party	Candidate	Votes	%	±%
Progressive Conservative	Tom Rideout	3,388	75.51	+0.98
Liberal	Neil Ward	798	17.78	-4.90
New Democratic	Tim Howse	301	6.71	
Total valid votes		4,487	99.51	
Total rejected ballots		22	0.49	+0.12
Turnout		4,509	55.78	-15.24
Electors on the lists		8,083	–	
Progressive Conservative hold		Swing		+2.94

=== Baie Verte ===
2003 Newfoundland and Labrador general election
Party	Candidate	Votes	%	±%
Progressive Conservative	Paul Shelley	3,045	74.52	+13.20
Liberal	Maurice Budgell	927	22.69	-15.99
Independent	William Day	114	2.79	
Total valid votes		4,086	99.63	
Total rejected ballots		15	0.37	+0.11
Turnout		4,101	71.03	+1.96
Eligible voters		5,774		
Progressive Conservative hold		Swing		+14.59

1999 Newfoundland general election
Party	Candidate	Votes	%	±%
Progressive Conservative	Paul Shelley	3,152	61.32	+1.27
Liberal	Gerald Burton	1,988	38.68	-1.27
Total valid votes		5,140	99.75	
Total rejected ballots		13	0.25	+0.13
Turnout		5,153	69.07	-10.88
Eligible voters		7,461		
Progressive Conservative hold		Swing		+1.27

1996 Newfoundland general election
Party	Candidate	Votes	%
Progressive Conservative	Paul Shelley	3,578	60.05
Liberal	Bud Hulan	2,380	39.95
Total valid votes		5,958	99.88
Total rejected ballots		7	0.12
Turnout		5,965	79.95
Eligible voters		7,461	

== See also ==
- List of Newfoundland and Labrador provincial electoral districts
- Canadian provincial electoral districts
