= Kevin Pollard =

Canadian politician

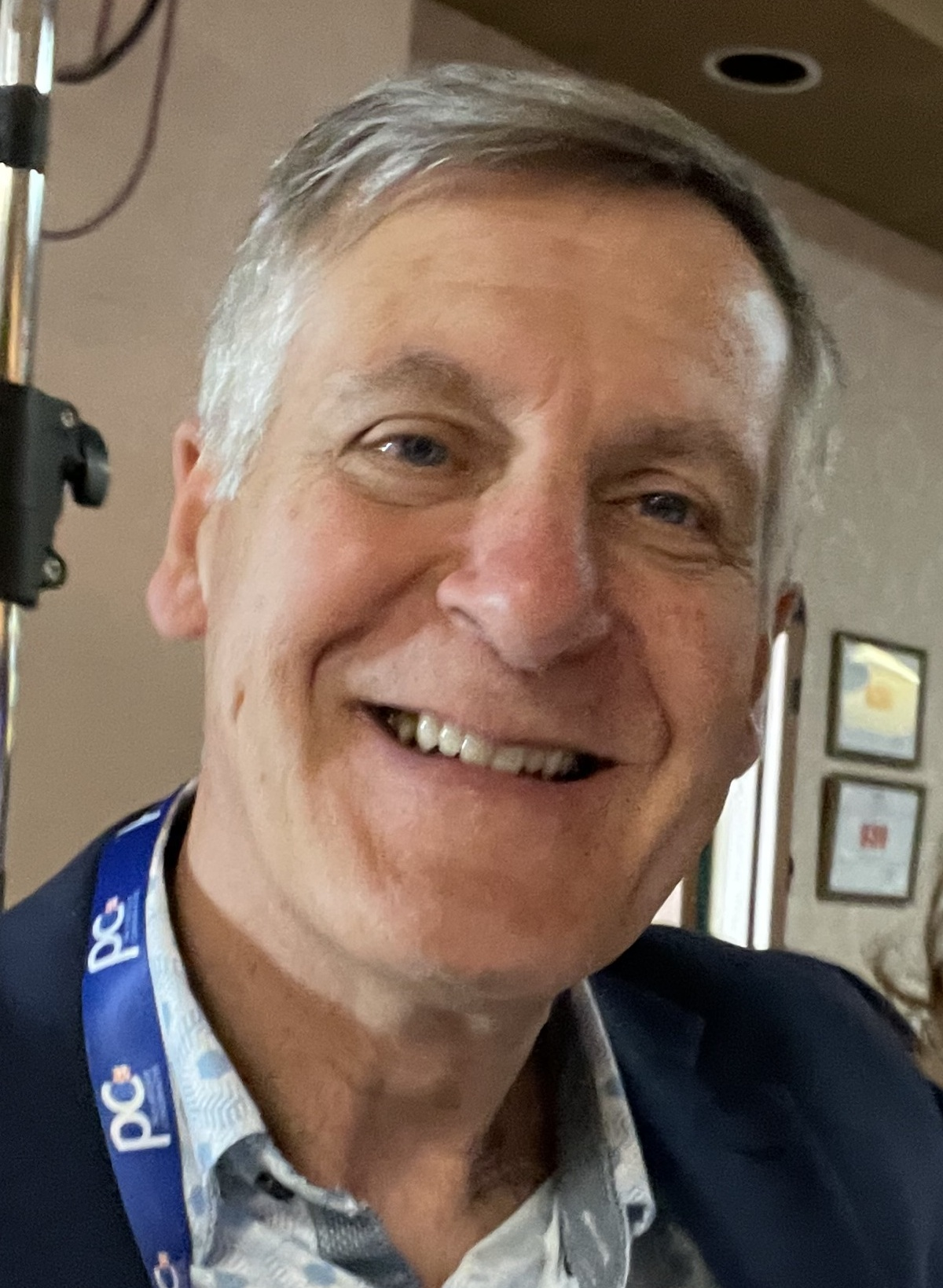
- Pollard in 2026

Member of the Newfoundland and Labrador House of Assembly for Baie Verte-Springdale
- In office August 27, 2008 – November 30, 2015
- Preceded by: Tom Rideout
- Succeeded by: District Abolished

Personal details
- Born: 1958 (age 67–68) Roddickton, Newfoundland and Labrador
- Party: Progressive Conservative

Kevin Pollard (born 1958) is a Canadian politician. He was elected to the Newfoundland and Labrador House of Assembly in a by-election on August 27, 2008, representing the electoral district of Baie Verte-Springdale as a member of the Progressive Conservatives. He was defeated in the 2015 election.

Pollard is an alumnus of A.C. Palmer Collegiate in Roddickton. Pollard attended and graduated from Memorial University of Newfoundland.

He is a former mayor of Springdale.

== Electoral record ==
2015 Newfoundland and Labrador general election
Party	Candidate	Votes	%	±%
Liberal	Brian Warr	3,130	56.09	+18.31
Progressive Conservative	Kevin Pollard	2,197	39.37	-13.42
New Democratic	Matt Howse	253	4.53	-4.90
Total valid votes		5,580	100%	

2011 Newfoundland and Labrador general election
Party	Candidate	Votes	%	±%
Progressive Conservative	Kevin Pollard	2,553	52.79	-3.11
Liberal	Neil Ward	1,827	37.78	+2.61
NDP	Tim Howse	456	9.43	+0.46

August 27, 2008 Baie Verte-Springdale By-election Resignation of Tom Rideout
Party	Candidate	Votes	%	±%
Progressive Conservative	Kevin Pollard	1,979	55.90	–
Liberal	Shaun Lane	1,245	35.17	
New Democratic Party	Tim Howse	316	8.97	
Total		3,540		
