= Green Bay, Newfoundland and Labrador =

Canadian bodies of water

Coordinates: 49°42′30″N 55°59′46″W

Location of Green Bay in Newfoundland

Green Bay is the name of two bays in the Canadian province of Newfoundland and Labrador.

- On Newfoundland, Green Bay is a natural bay located on the eastern side of the Baie Verte Peninsula. Communities located in Green Bay are: Burlington, Harry's Harbour, Jackson's Cove, King's Point, Little Bay, Middle Arm, Nicky's Nose Cove, Rattling Brook, Smith's Harbour, and Nipper's Harbour. In 1907, Newfoundland's Premier, Sir Robert Bond proposed an ocean line connection between Killary Harbour in Ireland and Green Bay in Newfoundland.
- On the south coast of Labrador, Green Bay is a naturally wooded bay on the north shore of the Strait of Belle Isle.
