= Brian Warr =

Canadian politician

The Honourable Brian Warr ECNL
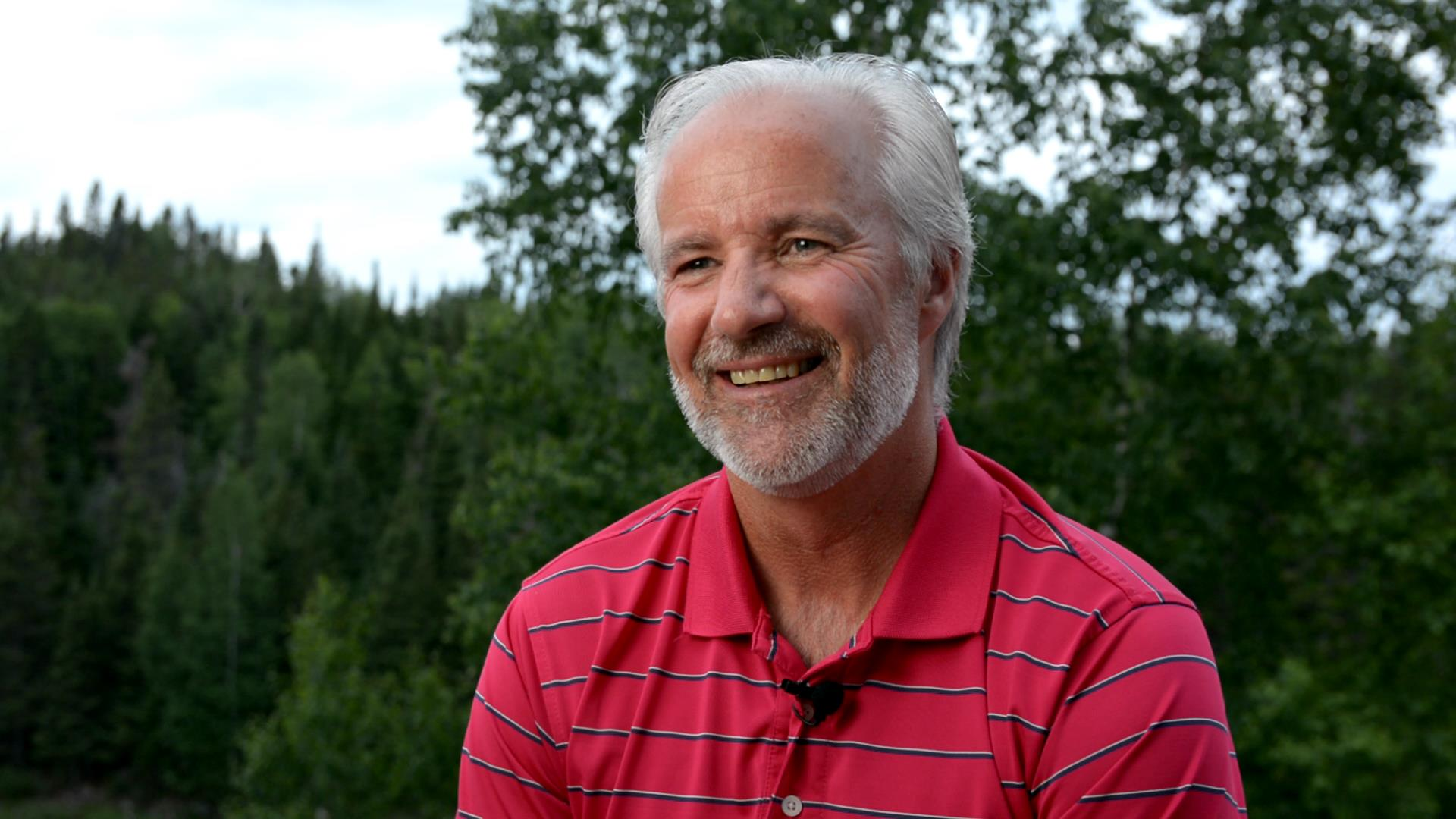

Minister of Children, Seniors and Social Development
- In office August 19, 2020 – April 8, 2021
- Preceded by: Lisa Dempster
- Succeeded by: John Abbott

Minister of Education and Early Childhood Development in Newfoundland and Labrador
- In office May 30, 2019 – August 19, 2020
- Preceded by: Lisa Dempster
- Succeeded by: Tom Osborne

Member of the Newfoundland and Labrador House of Assembly for Baie Verte-Green Bay
- In office November 30, 2015 – March 1, 2024
- Preceded by: Riding Established
- Succeeded by: Lin Paddock

Personal details
- Party: Liberal
- Occupation: Businessman

Brian H. Warr is a former Canadian politician. He was elected to the Newfoundland and Labrador House of Assembly in the 2015 provincial election, representing the electoral district of Baie Verte-Green Bay as a member of the Liberal Party until resigning in 2024.

Prior to his election, Warr was a businessman in Springdale.

In 2017, Warr was appointed Deputy Speaker and Chair of Committees of the House of Assembly serving until the 2019 election.

Warr was re-elected in the 2019 provincial election. Following the Ball government's re-election, Warr has appointed to cabinet as Minister of Education and Early Childhood Development, making him the first new cabinet appointee following the 2019 Newfoundland and Labrador general election. On August 19, 2020, Warr was appointed Minister of Children, Seniors and Social Development, Minister Responsible for NL Housing Corp, and Minister Responsible for Persons with Disabilities in the Furey government.

Warr was re-elected in the 2021 provincial election. He was dropped from Cabinet in April 2021.

On March 1, 2024, Warr announced his retirement from politics to spend more time with family and promptly resigned his seat in the legislature. The provincial by-election to replace him took place on May 27, 2024 electing PC Lin Paddock.

== Electoral record ==
2021 Newfoundland and Labrador general election: Baie Verte-Green Bay
Party	Candidate	Votes	%	±%
Liberal	Brian Warr	2,158	52.06	+2.34
Progressive Conservative	Lin Paddock	1,987	47.94	+14.80
Total valid votes		4,145	99.38	
Total rejected ballots		26	0.62	+0.22
Turnout		4,171	42.11	-17.85
Eligible voters		9,906		
Liberal hold		Swing		-6.23
Source(s) "Officially Nominated Candidates General Election 2021" (PDF). Elections Newfoundland and Labrador. "NL Election 2021 General Election Report" (PDF).

2019 Newfoundland and Labrador general election
Party	Candidate	Votes	%	±%
Liberal	Brian Warr	2,809	49.7	-6.4
Progressive Conservative	Neville Robinson	1,872	33.1	-6.3
NL Alliance	Ben Callahan	968	17.1	+17.1
Total valid votes		5,649	100	
Total rejected ballots		23		
Turnout		60.0		
Eligible voters		9,460		

2015 Newfoundland and Labrador general election
Party	Candidate	Votes	%	±%
Liberal	Brian Warr	3,130	56.09	+18.31
Progressive Conservative	Kevin Pollard	2,197	39.37	-13.42
New Democratic	Matt Howse	253	4.53	-4.90
Total valid votes		5,580	100%	
