= Francis Lind =

Newfoundland accountant and soldier

Francis Thomas Lind
- Born: March 9, 1879; Betts Cove, Little Bay, Newfoundland
- Died: July 1, 1916 (aged 37); Beaumont-Hamel, France
- Burial place: Beaumont-Hamel Newfoundland Memorial
- Military career
- Allegiance: Newfoundland
- Branch: British Army
- Service years: 1914–1916
- Rank: Private
- Nickname: "Mayo" Lind
- Unit: Royal Newfoundland Regiment
- Conflicts: Gallipoli campaign, Battle of the Somme

Francis Thomas Lind (March 9, 1879 – July 1, 1916) was a Newfoundland soldier. An accountant by trade, Lind volunteered for service during the First World War, eventually being killed in action on the Western Front in France. Correspondence written by Lind prior to his death later became widely published in his native Newfoundland, with Lind becoming a symbol of Newfoundlander service in the war. In light of his writings, Lind has been referred to as "Newfoundland's unofficial news correspondent" during the First World War.

== Biography ==
Lind was born on March 9, 1879, in Betts Cove, Little Bay, Newfoundland Colony. He was the son of a schoolteacher and one of five children. Following his schooling, Lind found work as a clerk and later as an accountant for a number of businesses, including Ayre and Sons.

When the First World War broke out, Lind - who at 35 was older than most recruits - volunteered for military service, joining the Royal Newfoundland Regiment. Lind and the regiment were first deployed to England for training and later to Fort George, Highland. While there, he wrote his first correspondence, one part of which (a complaint about the poor quality of English tobacco) was published in a St. John's newspaper and spurred the Imperial Tobacco Company to send the Newfoundland Regiment extra tobacco supplies. This occurrence allowed Lind to sign up for regular shipments of tobacco, known in the regiment as the "Mayo-Lind Tobacco Fund". Lind was also nicknamed "Mayo Lind" due to his new association with tobacco companies.

In 1915, the Newfoundland regiment was shipped to Egypt for acclimatization and then mobilized for the Gallipoli campaign. During the drawn out campaign and battles around Suvla Bay, Lind was hospitalized for jaundice, frostbite, and later influenza. In the spring of 1916 the Newfoundlanders were deployed to the front lines in France, taking up positions near Beaumont-Hamel. Lind continued to write until June 26, stopping before the start of the Battle of the Somme on July 1, 1916. On the first day of the offensive, the Newfoundland Regiment assaulted the German positions, losing several hundred men before being forced back. While advancing across a field near a landmark known now as the "Danger Tree", Lind was killed in action. His remains were not identified until after the battle, with Lind eventually being interred in the Beaumont-Hamel Newfoundland Memorial. Lind's death was reported on in local Newfoundland newspapers.

Following the war, Lind's correspondence was published in Newfoundland and eventually released as a volume, The letters of Mayo Lind. Lind's writings were disseminated throughout Newfoundland, with one source describing Lind as "Newfoundland's unofficial news correspondent". The Dictionary of Canadian Biography notes that Lind is remembered as a symbol of Newfoundlander resilience during the First World War.
