= Lin Paddock =

Canadian politician

The Honourable Lin Paddock ECNL MHA

Minister of Immigration
- Incumbent
- Assumed office October 29, 2025
- Preceded by: Gerry Byrne

Minister of Jobs and Growth
- Incumbent
- Assumed office October 29, 2025
- Preceded by: Gerry Byrne

Minister of Francophone Affairs
- Incumbent
- Assumed office October 29, 2025
- Preceded by: Sarah Stoodley

Minister of Rural Development
- Incumbent
- Assumed office October 29, 2025
- Preceded by: Pam Parsons

Member of the Newfoundland and Labrador House of Assembly for Baie Verte-Green Bay
- Incumbent
- Assumed office May 27, 2024
- Preceded by: Brian Warr

Personal details
- Born: November 17, 1966 (age 59) Roberts Arm, Newfoundland and Labrador, Canada
- Party: Progressive Conservative
- Occupation: Canadian Armed Forces commander

Arlanda "Lin" Malcolm Benjamin George Paddock is a Canadian politician from the Progressive Conservative Party. He was elected to the Newfoundland and Labrador House of Assembly in the 2024 Baie Verte-Green Bay provincial by-election. Paddock ran for the same riding in the 2021 Newfoundland and Labrador general election and lost to then-incumbent MHA Brian Warr of the Liberal Party.

A native of Roberts Arm, he was previously a Canadian Armed Forces commander. His parents are Samuel Lloyd Paddock and Julia Edith Paddock. He was the second youngest of 8 kids. He graduated Dorset Collegiate in 1984.

Paddock was re-elected in the 2025 Newfoundland and Labrador general election.

On October 29, 2025, Paddock was appointed as Minister of Immigration, Minister of Jobs and Growth, Minister of Rural Development, Minister of Francophone affairs.

On September 17, 2026, Paddock voted to approve the Churchill Falls Definitive Cooperation and Implementation Agreement (DCIA) in the House of Assembly along with the PC caucus.

== Electoral record ==
2025 Newfoundland and Labrador general election: Baie Verte-Green Bay
Party	Candidate	Votes	%	±%
Progressive Conservative	Lin Paddock	3,643	74.42	-4.64
Liberal	Owen Burt	1,013	20.69	+1.54
New Democratic	Sarah Hillier	239	4.88	+3.11
Total valid votes		4,895		
Total rejected ballots				
Turnout				
Eligible voters				
Progressive Conservative hold		Swing		-3.09

Newfoundland and Labrador provincial by-election, May 27, 2024 Resignation of Brian Warr
Party	Candidate	Votes	%	±%
Progressive Conservative	Lin Paddock	4,271	79.06	+31.13
Liberal	Owen Burt	1,035	19.16	-32.90
New Democratic	Riley Harnett	96	1.78	
Total valid votes		5,402		
Total rejected ballots				
Turnout			56.49	+14.39
Eligible voters		9,562		
Progressive Conservative gain from Liberal		Swing		+32.01

2021 Newfoundland and Labrador general election: Baie Verte-Green Bay
Party	Candidate	Votes	%	±%
Liberal	Brian Warr	2,158	52.06	+2.34
Progressive Conservative	Lin Paddock	1,987	47.94	+14.80
Total valid votes		4,145	99.38	
Total rejected ballots		26	0.62	+0.22
Turnout		4,171	42.11	-17.85
Eligible voters		9,906		
Liberal hold		Swing		-6.23
Source(s) "Officially Nominated Candidates General Election 2021" (PDF). Elections Newfoundland and Labrador. "NL Election 2021 General Election Report" (PDF).
