= Three Arms =

Coordinates: 49°41′04″N 55°54′10″W

Three Arms, Newfoundland and Labrador, Canada, is a small settlement founded in or about 1864. It is in Fogo and Twillingate District.

In the 1910s, the town had a population of about 140 people, with James Norris owning a fish cannery, fishing schooners, and the town's only store. Following the death of his son, Lieutenant Stephen Norris, in the First World War, he moved out of town and closed his businesses. The last residents of Three Arms left town in the 1940s. Today, the town is abandoned and the original buildings are no longer standing.

== See also ==
- List of communities in Newfoundland and Labrador
