= Department of Jobs, Growth and Rural Development =

Government department in Newfoundland and Labrador, Canada

Agency overview
- Formed: October 28, 2011
- Preceding agencies: Department of Human Resources, Labour and Employment; Department of Education; Department of Advanced Education, Skills, and Labour; Department of Immigration, Population Growth and Skills; Department of Jobs, Immigration and Growth
- Jurisdiction: Newfoundland and Labrador
- Headquarters: St. John's
- Employees: 600
- Minister responsible: Lin Paddock
- Website: www.gov.nl.ca/jgrd/

The Department of Jobs, Growth and Rural Development is a provincial government department in Newfoundland and Labrador, Canada. The department is headed by a member of the provincial cabinet, typically a Member of the House of Assembly, who is chosen by the premier and formally appointed by the Lieutenant-Governor of Newfoundland and Labrador. The current Minister of Jobs, Immigration and Growth is Lin Paddock. After the 2025 election the department was split into two different ministries, those being, the Department of Immigration and the Department of Jobs and Growth. MHA Lin Paddock heads both.

The department was created in October 2011 as the Department of Advanced Education, Skills, and Labour, by the government of Kathy Dunderdale, and incorporates most of the former Department of Human Resources, Labour and Employment as well as the advanced studies component of the Department of Education. In 2020, the department was reconfigured as Immigration, Skills and Labour. In 2025, the department was renamed the Department of Jobs, Immigration and Growth.

== Ministers ==
Key:

Progressive Conservative Party of Newfoundland and Labrador
Liberal Party of Newfoundland and Labrador

No.	Portrait	Name	Term of office		Political party	Premier
1		Gerry Byrne	December 14, 2015	July 31, 2017	Liberal	Dwight Ball
2		Al Hawkins	July 31, 2017	November 8, 2018	Liberal	Dwight Ball
3		Bernard Davis	November 8, 2018	September 6, 2019	Liberal	Dwight Ball
4		Christopher Mitchelmore	September 6, 2019	August 19, 2020	Liberal	Dwight Ball
5		Gerry Byrne	August 19, 2020	July 19, 2024	Liberal	Andrew Furey
6		Sarah Stoodley	July 19, 2024	May 9, 2025	Liberal	Andrew Furey
7		Gerry Byrne	May 9, 2025	October 14, 2025	Liberal	John Hogan
8		Lin Paddock	October 29, 2025		Progressive Conservative	Tony Wakeham

== See also ==
- Executive Council of Newfoundland and Labrador
