= Southern Arm =

Location in Newfoundland and Labrador

Coordinates: 49.647°N 55.647°W

Location of Southern Arm in Newfoundland and Labrador

Southern Arm is a settlement in Newfoundland and Labrador, located on Notre Dame Bay.
