= Little Bay, Newfoundland and Labrador =

Coordinates: 49.599°N 55.951°W

Little Bay
- Town
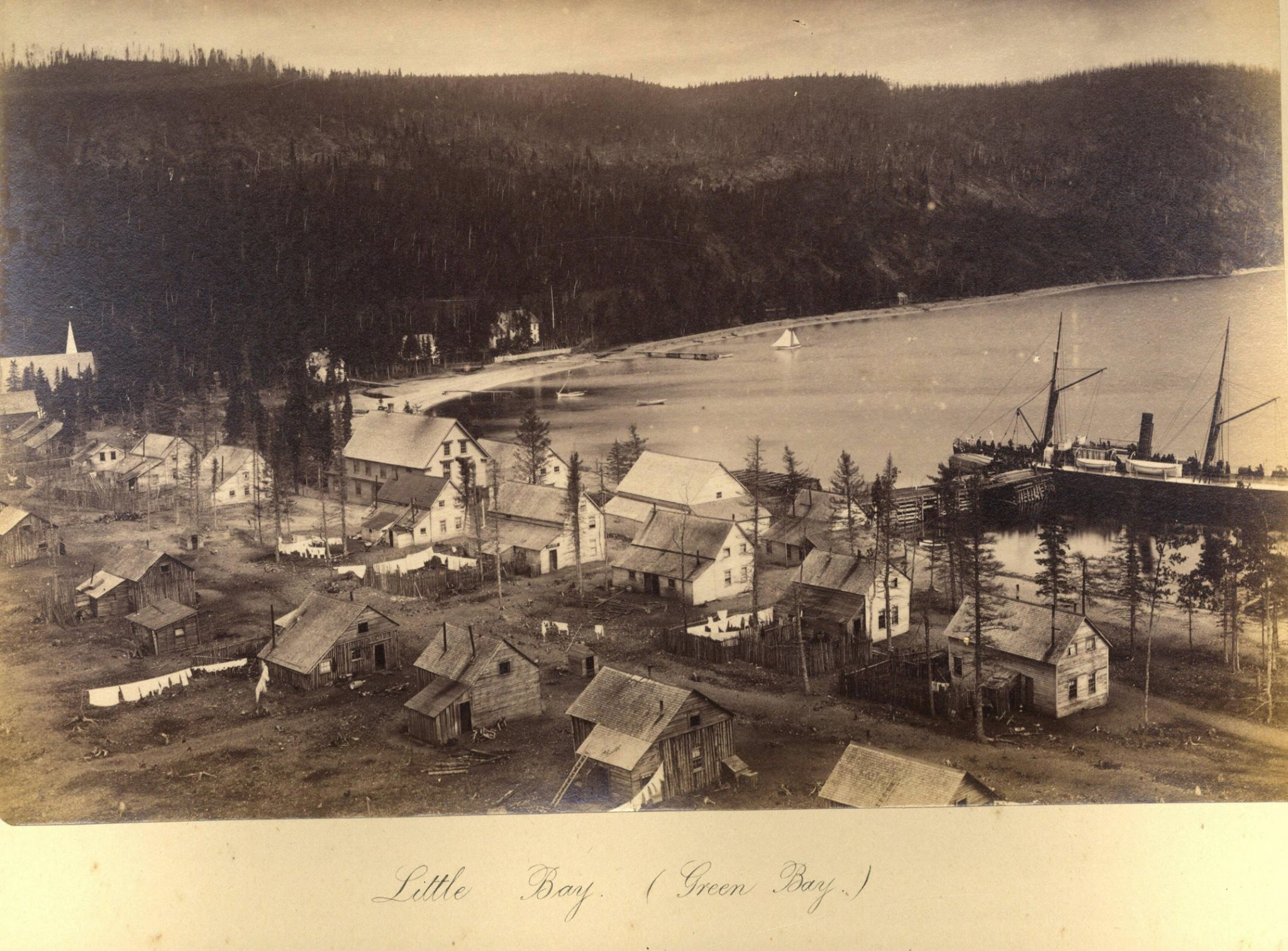
- Interactive map of Little Bay
- Country: Canada
- Province: Newfoundland and Labrador

Government

Population (2021)
  - Total: 100
- Time zone: UTC– 3:30 (Newfoundland Time)
  - Summer (DST): UTC– 2:30 (Newfoundland Daylight)
- Area code: 709

Little Bay is a town on the island of Newfoundland in the Canadian province of Newfoundland and Labrador. Its current population is roughly 100 people. It is located in Green Bay, which is part of Notre Dame Bay, and in the central part of Newfoundland.

Founded in 1878 and incorporated in 1966, the town of Little Bay is a historic mining community which boomed during the last decades of the 19th century and declined due to the loss of its primary industry and disaster by fires at the turn of the 20th century.

Some towns near Little Bay include Beachside, St Patrick's, Little Bay Islands, and the main center for Green Bay, Springdale.

== History ==
Little Bay was founded in the summer of 1878 by Baron Franz von Ellershausen, a German industrialist, after the accidental discovery of a copper ore deposit by a local hunter named Robert Colbourne. The town site which was previously an unoccupied wilderness claimed a population of over 500 people by the end of its first year and would witness a peak population of over 2,000 residents by 1891 making it one of the largest communities on the island at the time. The town became a hub of culture and commerce and was recognized as the unofficial capital of the Northern mining region. Little Bay mine was among the top copper producers in the world and referred to as "the gem of the island" and "the el Dorado of Newfoundland" in media coverage from the era. Newfoundland mining was expected to overtake fishing as the colony's main export with Little Bay leading this effort. The mining town attracted both local and international media attention as a result and plans were made to connect Little Bay to St. John's by railroad.

Historic Little Bay could boast several late 19th century luxuries such as a telegraph office, hospital, public hall, court house, hotel, advanced industrial wharfage, and a regionally competitive cricket team. During its boom years Little Bay hosted several notable visitors including Lurana W. Sheldon, Gustav Kobbé, William Kennedy, John McDonald, James Patrick Howley, Wilfred Grenfell, John Hawley Glover, Henry Arthur Blake, Terence O’Brien, and even Prince George although the last didn't make shore and remained in Little Bay's harbour onboard HMS Canada.

== Demographics ==
It can be difficult to compare historical demographic information on the town to current information as other nearby communities such as St. Patricks, Shoal Arm, Coffee Cove, and Otter Island were once considered to be part of Little Bay.

In the 2021 Census of Population conducted by Statistics Canada, Little Bay had a population of 100 living in 49 of its 69 total private dwellings, a change of −4.8% from its 2016 population of 105. With a land area of 1.66 km^{2} (0.64 sq mi), it had a population density of 60.2/km^{2} (156.0/sq mi) in 2021.

== Notable people ==
- John Bernard Croak – Little Bay born recipient of the Victoria Cross in the First World War
- Francis Thomas Lind – First World War soldier whose wartime correspondence was posthumously published.

== Sister Towns ==
- Betts Cove
- Ellershouse, Nova Scotia

== See also ==
- Heritage Foundation of Newfoundland and Labrador
- History of Little Bay
- List of communities in Newfoundland and Labrador
