= Coffee Cove =

Settlement in Newfoundland and Labrador, Canada

Coordinates: 49.590°N 55.951°W

Location of Coffee Cove in Newfoundland and Labrador

Coffee Cove is a settlement in the Canadian province of Newfoundland and Labrador. It reports sporadically in the census, though it is sometimes 'lumped' in with nearby places such as St. Patricks or Jackson's Cove. There are currently about 25 residents.
