= Government of Newfoundland and Labrador =

Canadian provincial government

- French: Gouvernement de Terre-Neuve-et-Labrador
- Provincial government
- Official logo of the Government of Newfoundland and Labrador
- Jurisdiction: Province
- Established: March 31, 1949

Formation and accountability
- Appointed by: Lieutenant Governor; Joan Marie Aylward
- Responsible to: House of Assembly

Organization
- Main organ: Executive Council
- Headquarters: St. John's
- Website: www.gov.nl.ca

The Government of Newfoundland and Labrador (French: Gouvernement de Terre-Neuve-et-Labrador) is the provincial government of the province of Newfoundland and Labrador. It was established by the Newfoundland Act and its powers and structure are set out in the Constitution Act, 1867.

== Role of the Crown ==
This arrangement began with the 1949 Newfoundland Act, and continued an unbroken line of monarchical government extending back to the late 15th century. However, though Newfoundland and Labrador has a separate government headed by the King, as a province, Newfoundland and Labrador is not itself a kingdom.

Government House in St. John's is used both as an official residence by the Lieutenant Governor, as well as the place where the sovereign and other members of the Royal Family will reside when in Newfoundland and Labrador. The mansion is owned by the sovereign in his capacity as King in Right of Newfoundland and Labrador, and not as a private individual; the house and other Crown property is held in trust for future rulers and cannot be sold by the monarch except by his Lieutenant Governor with the proper advice and consent from the Executive Council.

== Ministries ==
- Office of the Executive Council – Treasury Board Secretariat is within the Office of the Executive Council, including strategic human resource oversight, collective bargaining, treasury board support, program accountability, and the comptroller general’s office.
- Department of Social Supports and Well-Being – department is restructured to consist of all of those functions formerly within the Department of Children, Seniors and Social Development but excluding the wellness, sport, and recreation functions.
- Department of Government Services – this new department consists of all of those functions formerly within the Department of Service Newfoundland and Labrador, with two branches: Digital Government and Services, and Regulatory Affairs.
- Department of Education and Early Childhood Development – this new department includes functions formerly within the Department of Education and Early Childhood Development, and some of those post-secondary education functions formerly within the Department of Advanced Education, Skills and Labour with the exception of apprenticeship and trades certification and industrial training.
- Department of Environment, Conservation and Climate Change – this new department consists of all of those functions formerly within the Department of Municipal Affairs and Environment with the exception of the fire services, emergency services and municipal infrastructure functions. Protected areas functions move to this department from the former Department of Fisheries and Land Resources.
- Department of Finance – to be realigned to include three branches: Treasury Management and Budgeting, Economics and Statistics, and Tax and Fiscal Policy.
- Department of Fisheries and Aquaculture – this new department consists of all of those functions formerly within the Department of Fisheries and Land Resources but excluding the protected areas function.
- Department of Health and Community Services – to consist of all of those functions formerly within the Department of Health and Community Services, but excluding the health infrastructure function. The wellness function formerly within the Department of Children, Seniors and Social Development will now be assumed by the Department of Health and Community Services.
- Department of Jobs, Growth and Rural Development – this new department to consist of all of those functions formerly within the Department of Advanced Education, Skills and Labour including apprenticeship and trades certification and industrial training, but excluding post-secondary education functions.
- Department of Energy and Mines – this new department to consist of all of those functions formerly within the Department of Natural Resources and all of those industry and innovation functions formerly within the Department of Tourism, Culture, Industry and Innovation.
- Department of Justice and Public Safety – to consist of all of those functions formerly within the Department of Justice and Public Safety and all of those fire services and emergency services functions formerly within the Department of Municipal Affairs and Environment.
- Public Service Commission – to consist of all of those functions formerly within the Public Service Commission and all of those strategic staffing, opening doors, training, safety and wellness functions formerly within the Human Resource Secretariat.
- Department of Tourism, Culture, Arts and Recreation – this new department to consist of all of those functions formerly within the Department of Tourism, Culture, Industry and Innovation with the exception of the industry and innovation functions, and including all of those sport and recreation functions formerly within the Department of Children, Seniors and Social Development.
- Department of Transportation and Infrastructure – this new department to consist of all of those functions formerly within the Department of Transportation and Works and all of those municipal infrastructure functions formerly within the Department of Municipal Affairs and Environment and health infrastructure functions formerly within the Department of Health and Community Services.

== See also ==
- Politics of Newfoundland and Labrador
- Lieutenant Governor of Newfoundland and Labrador
- Premier of Newfoundland and Labrador
- General Assembly of Newfoundland and Labrador
- Newfoundland and Labrador House of Assembly
- Executive Council of Newfoundland and Labrador
