= Harry's Harbour, Newfoundland and Labrador =

Harry's Harbour LSD of HH
- Local service district / designated placevillage
- Location of Harry's Harbour in Newfoundland
- Coordinates: 49°42′00″N 55°55′00″W
- Country: Canada
- Province: Newfoundland and Labrador
- Established: 1889
- Time zone: UTC-3:30 (Newfoundland Time)
  - Summer (DST): UTC-2:30 (Newfoundland Daylight)
- Highways: Route 391

Harry's Harbour is a local service district and designated place in the Canadian province of Newfoundland and Labrador. It is southeast of Baie Verte.

== History ==
The way office was established in 1889. The first waymaster was Robert Howard.

=== Census history ===
1869

In the census of 1869, in the District of Fogo, the communities listed were as follows: #64 – Three Arms, #65 – Jerry's Cove, #66 – Wild Bight, #67 – Jackson's Cove, #68 – King's Cove and #69 – Salmon Cove. The population of Three Arms was 69 persons in that year with 64 in Jackson's Cove, 30 in Kings Cove and 23 in Salmon Cove (which is now referred to as Upward's Cove). It has not been possible to determine where Jerry's Cove is located but of the 23 people in the settlement 21 of them were Newfoundland born and 2 were British born. There was one cripple. Fifteen people were Wesleyan and eight were Church of England. Twelve persons were engaged in the catching and curing of fish and two were employed as AB seamen in the colony. There were three families in three houses and 5 children could read and write but there was no school. There were three stores/barns and 2 fish rooms in use. The inhabitants owned three oxen, 1 cow. 4 pigs, and 6 goats as well as having six acres of land under cultivation producing 1 tonne of hay and 86 barrels of potatoes. Fifty pounds of butter were produced and 16 nets were made in 1868. In Salmon Cove (Upward's Cove) there was also a population of 23 persons of whom 22 were Newfoundland born and one was of English birth. One person was a member of the Church of Rome, 9 were Wesleyan and 13 were Church of England. Three families in three houses and 4 barns/sheds and three fish rooms. Eight persons were engaged in the catching and curing of fish, three were AB seamen employed as fishermen in Newfoundland and other colonies and one was a merchant. Five children could read and write but there was no school. The people in Salmon Cove owned 6 oxen, 3 cows, 6 goats and on 9 acres of land they cultivated 4 tonnes of hay, 150 barrels of potatoes and 6 barrels of turnips plus they made 300 pounds of butter. They owned 1 boat (10 qls.) and 36 nets and seines.

1874

In 1874 the population of Harry's Harbour was 46 persons; sixteen were under the age of 10 years and 4 were over the age of 50. One woman was a widow. Ten people belonged to the Church of England and 36 were Wesleyan. In 1874 a vessel, with 4 crew, went sealing. In the same year, small boats, of approximately 40 tonnes caught and cured 275 quintals of codfish and produced 180 gallons of cod liver oil. In 1874 the people of Harry's Harbour owned 4 cows, 10 sheep, 18 pigs and 8 goats. Two tonnes of hay was produced and 158 barrels of potatoes were grown. In the same year the population of Three Arms was 66, Jackson's Cove – 82, Birchy Cove – 11 and Nick's Nose/Langdown's Cove – 23.

1884

In 1884 the population of Harry's Harbour was 65 persons. Sixteen were under the age of 10 and ten were between the ages of 50 and 70. In 1883 there was 1 birth, 1 death and 1 marriage. Sixty-four persons were Newfoundland born and 1 was English born. There was 1 widow and 1 widower. All 65 persons were Wesleyans. Thirty-four could read and write. Five children between the ages of 5 and 15 were in school but 18 were not. There was 1 school house. Forty persons were fisherfolk. There were 2 fishing boats (10 qls.) with 13 nets and 2 traps. Ninety-three qls. Of codfish and 120 barrels of capelin valued at 79 pounds sterling were caught and 78 gallons of cod liver oil was produced. There were 11 houses, 15 barns/sheds and 7 fish rooms in use. In 1884 5 tonnes of hay and 97 barrels of potatoes were grown on 9 acres of cultivated land. There were 27 sheep, 2 cows, 2 goats and 1 swine. In the same year the population of Three Arms was 102, Western Arm – 13, King's Cove – 45, Salmon Cove – 45, Nick's Nose Cove – 9, Langdown's Cove – 15, Jackson's Cove – 99 and Birchy Cove -15.

1891

In 1891 the population of Harry's Harbour was 101. Eighteen were under the age of 10 years and 17 were over the age of 50 years. There were 18 married couples, 3 widows and 1 widower. In 1890 there were 3 births, 1 death and 2 marriages. Ninety-eight people were Newfoundland born. There was 1 cripple. There was 1 Methodist church with a congregation of 81. Sixteen people were Salvation Army, 3 were Baptist, 1 Church of Rome. There was one full-time farmer and 35 planters (farming & fishing). Thirty-two females were engaged in the curing of fish. One person was otherwise employed. One vessel of 35 tonnes, with a crew of 6 men and 1 woman, went to the Labrador fishery in 1890 and caught 200 qls. of fish. The vessel was built in 1889/1890. Inshore fishermen owned 40 small boats ranging in size from 5 to 30 qls. with 50 nets and 2 traps. They caught 303 qls. of cod, 6 tierces of salmon, 46 barrels of herring and produced 371 gallons of cod liver oil for a total of $2,616. Four men and 5 females were employed in two lobster factories. In 1890 24 lobster traps caught 46 cases of lobsters valued at $103. Forty males and thirty-five females could read and write but none of the 31 children under the age of 15 attended a school. There were 18 houses inhabited by 20 families. Two houses were built in 1890, 2 were under construction and 1 was uninhabited. There were 25 barns/storehouses and 2 fishing rooms in use. Nineteen people owned 216 acres of land valued at 237. In 1890 33 tonnes of hay, 609 barrels of potatoes and 5 barrels of turnips were grown. The livestock consisted of 3 horses, 8 Milch cows, 129 sheep, 67 pigs and 143 fowl. Six cows, 42 sheep and 26 pigs were killed for food plus 176 pounds of butter and 296 pounds of wool were produced. In 1890 the population of Jackson's Cove was 89, Three Arms – 83, Bear Cove – 29, King's Cove – 29, Nicks Nose Cove – 20 and Birchy Cove – 10.

1901

In 1901 the population of Harry's Harbour was 192; 62 persons were under the age of 10 years and 24 persons were over the age of 50 including 1 female and 1 male over the age of 80 years. In 1900 there were 36 married couples, 6 widows, and 4 widowers. In the past year there had been 9 births, 2 deaths and 6 marriages. One person was of English birth and the rest were born ion Newfoundland. There were 130 Methodists, 35 Salvation Army and 27 were Church of England. There was 1 church. In one section of the 1901 census it is stated that "one schoolhouse capable of accommodating "50 scholars" but in another it states that "58 children live at least 1.5 miles from a Schoolhouse". Fifty-four males and 48 females could read and write and 49 males and 35 females could write. There were 34 houses inhabited by 39 families; 4 houses were under construction and 2 were uninhabited. There were 49 barns/outhouses, 20 fishing rooms and 1 business premise. There were 9 farmers, 46 male and 43 female fisherfolk plus 4 persons "otherwise employed". In Harry's Harbour in 1901 there were 8 vessels (total tonnage - 140) engaged in the fishery. One vessel of 20 tonnes, with a crew of 5, caught 170 qls. of fish in Labrador. The inshore fishermen had 66 nets and 8 traps and caught 1,299 qls. of cod, 5 tierces of salmon, 49 barrels of herring plus 5 seals. Along with 1,449 gallons of cod liver oil the total catch value was $5,942. Thirty people owned 247 acres of land and they cleared 131 acres of land in 1900. Fifty-one tones of hay, 540 barrels of potatoes, 14 barrels of turnips and 7,200 heads of cabbage were grown. They owned 5 horses, 26 cattle, 163 sheep, 107 pigs, 34 goats and 259 fowl. They produced 605 pounds of butter and 489 pounds of wool. They killed 23 cattle, 74 sheep and 49 pigs for food. In 1901 the population of Three Arms was 78, Western Arm – 3, Bear Cove – 39, Nicks Nose Cove – 43, Jackson's Cove – 106 and Birchy Cove had 16 persons. In "A YearBook and Almanac of Newfoundland for 1900" it is stated that Robert Upward was the postmaster for Harry's Harbour but the nearest post office was Jackson's Cove or Little Bay.

1911

In 1911 the population of Harry's Harbour was 200 of whom 58 were under the age of 10 years and 17 over the age of 50 and 2 males were over 80. Four people were born in Scotland, 2 from Ireland and 1 from "other British Colonies". There were 2 orphans (1 female and 1 male) and there were 5 paupers. There were 137 Methodist, 59 Salvation Army and 4 Presbyterian citizens. There were 2 teachers, 4 merchants (Roland Evans, John White, Robert Upward and John Upward), 25 planters, 7 mechanics (?), 35 fishermen and 2 "otherwise employed". There were 33 houses, containing 190 rooms and sheltering 34 families. There were 63 barns/outhouses/storerooms, 2 business premises, and 12 fishing rooms in use. A Loyal Orange Hall, valued at $700, could accommodate 150 persons. A Salvation Army church was built with a seating capacity of 100 persons (value - $400). There was also a Methodist church. In 1911 there were 49 students, aged 5 to 15 years, in school. One hundred thirty two people over the age of 5, could, or were learning to, read and write. The 1 room Salvation Army school, valued at $150, had 1 male teacher with 4 female and 5 male students. The 1 room Methodist school, valued at $400, had 1 female teacher with 13 female and 20 male students. In 1910 one vessel of 56 tonnes and a crew of 6 men, went to Labrador and returned with 39 qls. of cured cod. In Harry's Harbour 6 vessels with a combined tonnage of 154, employing 26 persons and 64 nets caught 879 qls. of cod. Also 918 gallons of cod liver oil (value of $184), 2,107 barrels of pickled herring ($6,321), and 10 cases of lobsters ($150) were sold. There was 1 lobster factory. The total value of the 1910 fishery in Harry's Harbour was $12,135. Seventy-four acres of land was under cultivation producing 35 tonnes of hay ($700), 304 barrels of potatoes ($600), 6 barrels of turnips ($8) and 2200 heads of cabbage ($110) were harvested in 1911. Five horses, 18 cattle, 129 sheep, 57 goats and 212 fowl comprised the livestock of the community. Eleven cattle, 49 sheep and 17 pigs were killed for food. They produced 400 pounds of butter, 4,450 gallons of milk (from 10 cows) and 370 pounds of wool. In 1911 the population of Springdale was 369, Kings Point – 259, Jackson's Cove – 127, Rattling Brook – 112, Bear Cove – 64, Three Arms – 54, Kings Cove – 25, Birchy Cove – 18, Nicks Nose Cove – 18, Langdowns Cove – 14 and Donald's Arm was 8.

1921

In 1921 the population of Harry's Harbour was 189 persons of whom 55 were under the age of 10 years and 21 were over the age of 50. One male and one female were over 80 years. There were 41 married couples, 3 widowers, 1 widow, 1 blind person, 3 disabled persons and 1 idiot (morons and lunatics were also categories). Two children, under the age of 15, were motherless but the father was alive. Of the 189 persons 186 were Newfoundland born, 2 were from "other British colonies" and 1 was born in Ireland. There were 56 males and 33 females engaged in the catching and curing of fish, 19 planters, 3 farmers, 1 merchant, 1 government worker and 6 persons otherwise employed. There was 1 Salvation Army church building with a seating capacity of 200. The land and building was valued at $500. The Methodist church building had a seating capacity of 300 and the value of land and building was $600. Six people were Church of England, 54 Salvation Army and 129 Methodist. A one-room Salvation Army school house, with a seating capacity of 30 and a value of $500, had 5 male and 4 female students and 1 male teacher. A one-room Methodist schoolhouse, with a seating capacity of 70 and valued at $1000, had 20 male and 13 female pupils and 1 female teacher. Nine children were not attending school; 104 persons over the age of 10 could read and write but 29 could not. The Loyal Orange Association hall, capable of holding 50 persons, was valued at $700. Fifteen houses, with 73 rooms, were inhabited by 16 families. There were 49 barns/stables, 8 fish rooms and 6 business premises in use. The people of Harry's Harbour had 110 acres of land under cultivation and 3 acres in pasture in 1920. In that year they produced 36 tonnes of hay ($1620), 598 barrels of potatoes ($2,093), 47 barrels of turnips ($141), 4,800 heads of cabbage ($240), and 174 gallons of fruits and small berries valued at $88. They owned 16 horses, 22 cows, 130 sheep, 15 swine, 50 goats and 232 poultry. They produced 8,800 gallons of milk, 880 pounds of butter, 363 pounds of wool and 606 dozen eggs. They killed 21 cattle, 58 sheep and 9 swine for food. Approximately 9000 trees were cut for firewood, 210 for fence posts and 20 were wharf sticks (valued at $10 each). In the inshore fishery, 26 boats, employing 52 persons and using 144 nets and 6 traps, caught 676 qls. of codfish. One lobster factory, employing 2 men and 30 traps caught 4 cases of lobsters valued at $50, Three hundred twenty gallons of cod liver oil was sold. The total value of the 1920 inshore fishery was $5,350. In 1921 the population of Three Arms was 47, Southern Arm – 54, Kings Cove – 43, Nick's Nose Cove – 22, Langdowns Cove – 17, Jackson's Cove – 161, Silverdale – 68 and Birchy Cove – 16.

1935

In 1935 the population of Harry's Harbour was 199 of whom 106 were male and 93 female. There were 37 married couples, 67 single males, 48 single females, 8 widows and 2 widowers. There were 4 orphans with only the mother alive. Forty-one families lived in 39 houses with 217 rooms. Five houses were vacant and 2 were rented. The 37 houses owned by the families living in them were valued at $11,220. There were 61 barns/stables/outhouses valued at $3,050. Fourteen fish rooms, not all in use, were valued at $1,570. The village's fishing gear, valued at $8,547, consisted of 5 cod traps, 1 cod net, 18 salmon nets, 10 herring nets and 5 capelin seines. There were also 37 dories, 19 motor boats and 2 fishing schooners for a total of 56 tonnes. Seven people were Pentecostal, 51 Salvation Army and 141 members of the United Church. There were 35 students (17 male and 18 female) of whom 3 attended class for 3 months or less. Of 150 persons over the age of 10 years (80 male/70 female) 110 could read and write, 7 could read only and 33 could do neither. In 1934 103 acres of land were used for hay, 1 acre for turnips, 19 acres of potatoes, 66 acres of pasture and 11 wooded or timbered. They grew 5 tonnes of hay, 4,400 pounds of cabbage, 80 barrels of turnips (11 were sold) and 3,227 bushels of potatoes (188 bu. were sold). They also picked 570 gallons of small fruits and berries. There were 12 horses, 10 ponies, 14 cows, 3 sows, 1 boar, 108 ewes, 1 ram, 64 lambs, 50 female and 1 male goat, 125 chickens (under 1 year old) and 185 hens. They produced 2,257 gallons of milk, 195 pounds of butter and 472 dozen eggs. In 1935 the population of Three Arms was 23, Southern Arm – 64, King's Cove – 43, Nicky's Nose Cove – 29, Jackson's Cove – 114, Langdown's Cove – 30, Silverdale – 65 and Birchy Cove – 7. In 1935 the only lunatic in Green Bay was from Silverdale.

1945

In 1945, out of a total population of 180 persons (106 male/74 female) 38 persons were under the age of 10 years and 8 were over the age of 70. There were 36 married couples and 98 single persons plus 10 widow(er)s. Two people were Church of England, 9 Pentecostal, 59 Salvation Army and 110 members of the United Church. Twenty-four people were illiterate, 2 could read but not write and 116 could read and write. Of 93 acres of cultivated land, 72 acres were for the cultivation of hay, 20 acres for potatoes and 1 acre of turnips. In 194 they produced 80 tonnes of hay, 2,511 bushels of potatoes and 120 bushels of turnips. There were 17 horses, 27 pigs, 135 sheep, 18 goats, 19 cows, 192 hens and 85 dogs. In 1944 they produced 284 pounds of wool, 525 gallons of milk and 1,383 dozen eggs. There were 6 cod nets, 32 salmon drift nets, 62 herring nets, 3 herring seines, 2 caplin seines and 60 lobster traps for a total value of $9,115. There was a total of 17 fish rooms and 28 motor boats.

== Geography ==
Harry's Harbour is in Newfoundland within Subdivision P of Division No. 8.

== Demographics ==
As a designated place in the 2016 Census of Population conducted by Statistics Canada, Harry's Harbour recorded a population of 73 living in 38 of its 89 total private dwellings, a change of 5.8% from its 2011 population of 69. With a land area of 2.47 km^{2} (0.95 sq mi), it had a population density of 29.6/km^{2} (76.5/sq mi) in 2016.

== Government ==
Harry's Harbour is a local service district (LSD) that is governed by a committee responsible for the provision of certain services to the community. The chair of the LSD committee is Vincent Verge.

== Transportation ==
In 1960, Harry's Harbour was connected to the provincial road system.

== See also ==
- List of communities in Newfoundland and Labrador
- List of designated places in Newfoundland and Labrador
- List of local service districts in Newfoundland and Labrador
