= Rattling Brook, Newfoundland and Labrador =

Coordinates: 49°37′N 56°11′W

Rattling Brook
- Local service district / designated place
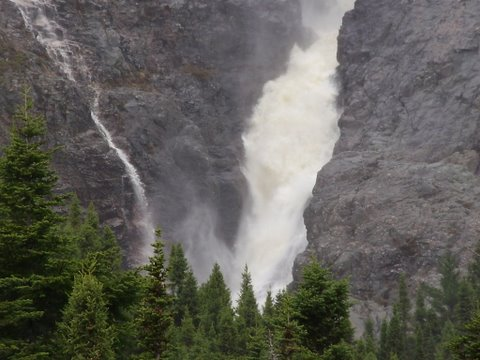
- Rattling Brook Falls
- Interactive map of Rattling Brook
- Country: Canada
- Province: Newfoundland and Labrador

Population (2010)
  - Total: 90–110
- Time zone: UTC-3:30

Rattling Brook is a local service district and designated place in the Canadian province of Newfoundland and Labrador. It is in the north-central portion of the island of Newfoundland near Baie Verte and Springdale. Formerly a fishing village, its main residents are retirees and seasonal tourists.

== Geography ==
Rattling Brook is in Newfoundland within Subdivision P of Division No. 8. The area in and around Rattling Brook is home to a diverse group of wildlife, both mammal and aquatic. During the summer months, species of fox, lynx and bear are not unusual. In the colder months, sealife observed in the bay area range from seals, humpback whales and several varieties of bird. The unique microclimate of the area provides shelter from harsher winds, guarded by the surrounding groups of cliff and rock formation enveloping the area. Seals and other amphibious and aquatic life have been seen in and about the area.

=== Climate ===
Rattling Brook has a humid continental climate (Köppen Dfb) with moderately warm summers and cold, snowy winters. For its latitude in Eastern Canada, Rattling Brook has highly moderated winters due to the proximity to the Atlantic Ocean.

Climate data for Rattling Brook
Month	Jan	Feb	Mar	Apr	May	Jun	Jul	Aug	Sep	Oct	Nov	Dec	Year
Record high °C (°F)	15.5 (59.9)	14.0 (57.2)	17.0 (62.6)	23.5 (74.3)	30.0 (86.0)	33.0 (91.4)	34.0 (93.2)	35.0 (95.0)	32.0 (89.6)	25.6 (78.1)	21.1 (70.0)	17.8 (64.0)	35.0 (95.0)
Mean daily maximum °C (°F)	−2.7 (27.1)	−2.5 (27.5)	1.2 (34.2)	6.8 (44.2)	13.4 (56.1)	18.3 (64.9)	22.9 (73.2)	22.6 (72.7)	17.6 (63.7)	10.9 (51.6)	5.0 (41.0)	0.2 (32.4)	9.5 (49.1)
Daily mean °C (°F)	−7.5 (18.5)	−7.7 (18.1)	−3.4 (25.9)	2.4 (36.3)	8.1 (46.6)	12.6 (54.7)	17.3 (63.1)	17.2 (63.0)	12.6 (54.7)	6.7 (44.1)	1.5 (34.7)	−3.7 (25.3)	4.7 (40.5)
Mean daily minimum °C (°F)	−12.4 (9.7)	−12.8 (9.0)	−8.1 (17.4)	−2.0 (28.4)	2.8 (37.0)	6.8 (44.2)	11.6 (52.9)	11.8 (53.2)	7.6 (45.7)	2.5 (36.5)	−2.1 (28.2)	−7.6 (18.3)	−0.2 (31.6)
Record low °C (°F)	−32.8 (−27.0)	−36.7 (−34.1)	−32.0 (−25.6)	−18.5 (−1.3)	−9.4 (15.1)	−3.5 (25.7)	0.0 (32.0)	−0.6 (30.9)	−3.3 (26.1)	−10.0 (14.0)	−20.0 (−4.0)	−33.3 (−27.9)	−36.7 (−34.1)
Average precipitation mm (inches)	95.0 (3.74)	88.2 (3.47)	91.0 (3.58)	84.5 (3.33)	86.9 (3.42)	87.9 (3.46)	90.6 (3.57)	103.2 (4.06)	111.2 (4.38)	104.1 (4.10)	99.6 (3.92)	97.2 (3.83)	1,139.6 (44.87)
Average snowfall cm (inches)	70.8 (27.9)	63.6 (25.0)	54.7 (21.5)	27.4 (10.8)	3.7 (1.5)	0.6 (0.2)	0.0 (0.0)	0.0 (0.0)	0.0 (0.0)	2.6 (1.0)	20.5 (8.1)	55.4 (21.8)	299.3 (117.8)
Average precipitation days	12.9	11.3	13.0	13.7	15.3	14.1	14.2	14.1	15.0	16.5	14.2	14.0	168.4

== Demographics ==
As a designated place in the 2016 Census of Population conducted by Statistics Canada, Rattling Brook recorded a population of 90 living in 41 of its 63 total private dwellings, a change of −10.9% from its 2011 population of 101. With a land area of 6.98 km^{2} (2.69 sq mi), it had a population density of 12.9/km^{2} (33.4/sq mi) in 2016.

== Attractions ==
The community has a park at the base of Rattling Brook Falls, a 140-metre waterfall beneath a natural rock formation.

== Government ==
Rattling Brook is a local service district (LSD) that is governed by a committee responsible for the provision of certain services to the community. The chair of the LSD committee is Jim Rowsell.

== See also ==
- List of communities in Newfoundland and Labrador
- List of designated places in Newfoundland and Labrador
- List of local service districts in Newfoundland and Labrador
