= King's Point =

Coordinates: 49.5809°N 56.1833°W

- Town
- Interactive map of King's Point
- Country: Canada
- Province: Newfoundland and Labrador

Population (2021)
  - Total: 653
- Time zone: UTC-3:30 (Newfoundland Time)
  - Summer (DST): UTC-2:30 (Newfoundland Daylight)
- Area code: 709
- Highways: Route 391
- Website: www.townofkingspoint.ca

King's Point is a town on the north shore of the southwest arm of Green Bay in Newfoundland and Labrador, Canada. King's Point is 24 km (15 mi) by road (Route 391) from Springdale, and 10 km (6.2 mi) from the Trans-Canada Highway (Route 1).

== History ==
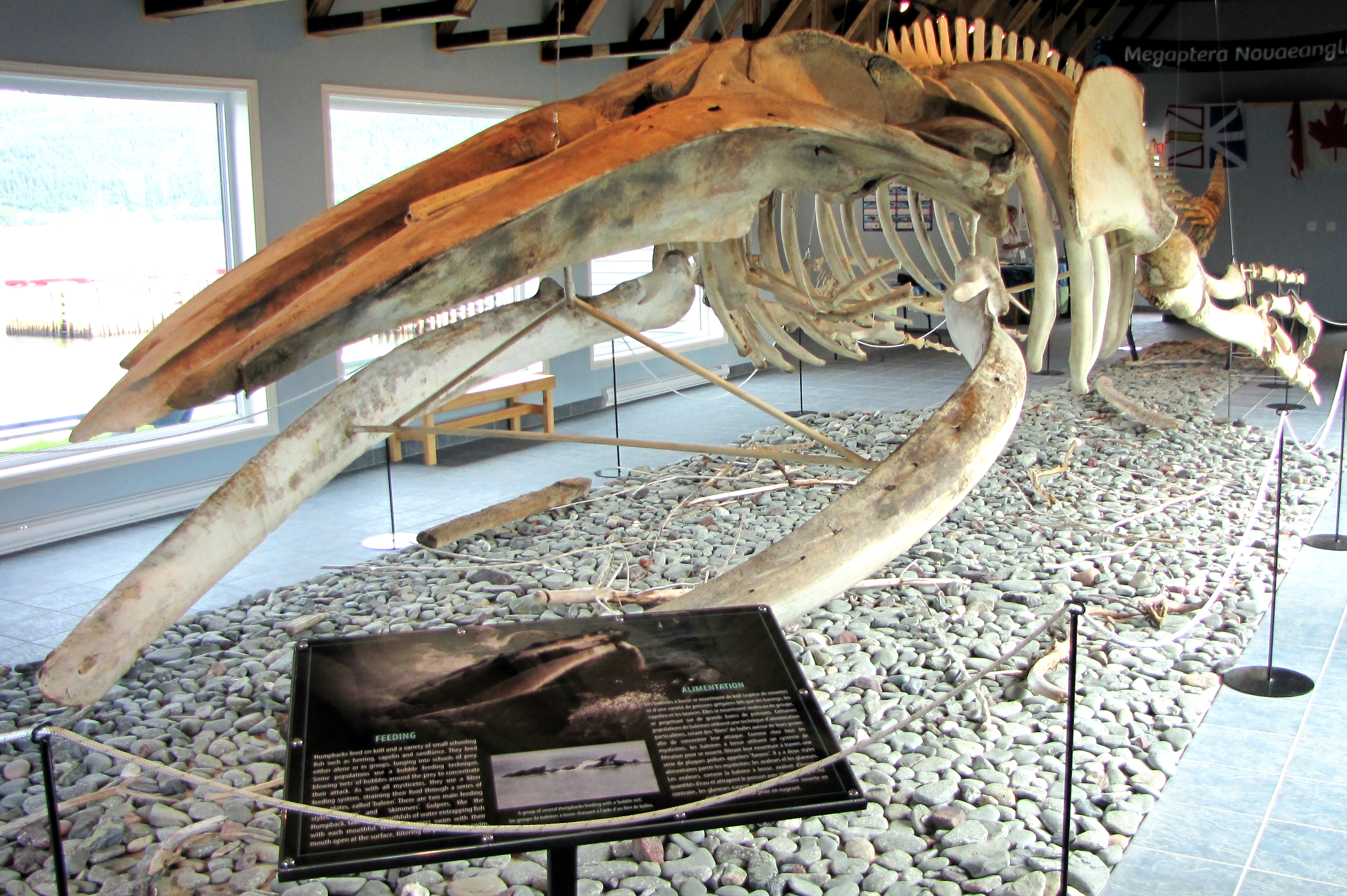
Humpback whale skeleton in a museum in King's Point

The earliest inhabitants of King's Point were the Maritime Archaic Indians and later the Beothuk Indians. Before the 1860s the area was a source of timber for French fishermen and naval vessels occupying the "French Shore". In the 1860s the first known European settler, James King, established fishing premises and a dwelling on the Point. This is how the community got its name. His dwelling was destroyed by high tides shortly after and abandoned by King.

As early as 1870, King's Point has had a telegraph office. In 1880, it became a repeater station on a line running from the Newfoundland Railway line to Tilt Cove and Bett's Cove. Michael Smart became its first operator. In the early 1900s, fishing and farming were the economic mainstay. A herring canning industry was established by the Redmonds and others with export to Europe. This industry ended before 1920. Fishing hasn't been very important in King's Point since, although there are a few residents today who depend on it for a living.

As the fishery declined, sawmilling became the main employer. The Thistle family moved in around 1900 and set up a large sawmill and shingle mill, as well as a retail business, on the "Point", which became (and remained) the major employer until about 1938-1940, when the family moved its operations to Burlington.

From the 1900 to present day, smaller sawmills operated and contributed to the local economy. In the 1940s and 1950s, many residents engaged in producing pulpwood for export to Germany. Starting in the 1960s to the present day the production, haulage, and trucking of pulpwood for the papermills at Corner Brook and Grand Falls, has provided the majority of employment to the people of King's Point. Subsistence farming provided part of a living to early residents and gradually evolved into the commercial farming ventures that are significant contributor to the economies of King's Point and Rattling Brook today.

The first Salvation Army officer was stationed in King's Point in 1921; the church is still in operation. In the 1970s, the first Pentecostal Church was opened and the Pentecostal Assemblies are still operating today.

Since the 1980s, Valmont Academy, an all-grade school, now serves students in the King's Point–Harry's Harbour area. There is a modern gym, labs, library and other facilities.

== Demographics ==
In the 2021 Census of Population conducted by Statistics Canada, King's Point had a population of 653 living in 290 of its 336 total private dwellings, a change of −0.9% from its 2016 population of 659. With a land area of 45.72 km^{2} (17.65 sq mi), it had a population density of 14.3/km^{2} (37.0/sq mi) in 2021.

== See also ==
- Royal eponyms in Canada
