= Beachside, Newfoundland and Labrador =

Beachside Wild Bight
- Town
- Location of Beachside in Newfoundland
- Coordinates: 49°38′24.50″N 55°53′49.50″W
- Country: Canada
- Province: Newfoundland and Labrador

Government
  - Mayor: Vincent Bennett

Population (2025)
  - Total: 73
- Time zone: UTC-3:30 (Newfoundland Time)
  - Summer (DST): UTC-2:30 (Newfoundland Daylight)
- Area code: 709
- Highways: Route 392

Beachside is a town in the Canadian province of Newfoundland and Labrador, in Notre Dame Bay. The town had a population of 97 in the Canada 2021 Census, down from 150 in 2011.

Consisting in the past primarily of fishermen and miners, today it mainly consists of small families and most of the men go away for work. It is very scenic and provides a variety for any geographer. The community of Beachside, once known as Brookside and Wild Bight, was settled in the 19th century, when the mine opened in Little Bay.

== Location ==
Beachside (Wild Bight) is located on the north side of Little Bay. The community is placed on the west side of the cove at the Bight's bottom, where there is a broad, rocky beach.

Huge masses of ice may often be seen floating across the bay over Backcove Hill during lush summer months.

== History ==
Beachside was used as a summer station by fishermen from Twillingate before it was settled in the 1850s.

According to an 1857 census there were 16 people living there, but, by 1874, this number increased to 55 and remained at that until the mid-20th century. The fishermen traded their catches to nearby Little Bay Islands where their families attended the Methodist church. Beachside residents also went to the Labrador fishery from Little Bay Island. Some of the men from Beachside found work as miners in Little Bay after 1878; the major impact of the mine on Beachside was the number of miners who returned to fishing after the mine closed in 1900. In the mid-1920s younger men left to work on the construction of the pulp and paper mill at Corner Brook, and later as loggers. In 1935 there were only 36 people left in the community. In the 1940s and 1950s the community began to grow again as people moved in from Southern Arm, Springdale, Little Bay or Little Bay Islands. In 1956 there were 172 people.

== Demographics ==
In the 2021 Census of Population conducted by Statistics Canada, Beachside had a population of 97 living in 52 of its 70 total private dwellings, a change of −26.5% from its 2016 population of 132. With a land area of 2.58 km^{2} (1.00 sq mi), it had a population density of 37.6/km^{2} (97.4/sq mi) in 2021.

== Services ==
The community of Beachside gets its mail from rural mail boxes and the nearest post office to the community is in Little Bay. The residents have access to cable television through Regional Cable Television. Newfoundland and Labrador Hydro provides the community with electricity, and its source of power is the Springdale Terminal Station. The station has a voltage of 12 500v and a transformer capacity of 333. The roads in the community are paved but are considered by the residents to be in poor condition. The nearest airport to the community is in Deer Lake and the nearest emergency air service is located at Springdale Junction. There are no longer any businesses located in Beachside. There are no banks, financial institutions or insurance companies in Beachside but residents have access to these facilities in Springdale.

Residents have access to both satellite and DSL internet, the latter of which does not exceed 8 Mbit/s download and 0.5 Mbit/s upload.

=== Education ===
There was one school in the community. It was called Beachside Pentecostal Academy built in 1984. It was a primary and elementary school under the Pentecostal Assemblies Board of Education. The school had 3 classrooms, 2 teachers and 30 students. The school closed in June 1999. Students are now bused to school in Springdale.

=== Religious services ===
There was a Pentecostal Church in the community, which was the only church in Beachside. The church was put up for sale after the former pastor moved away and a replacement could not be found. Pentecostal Christians must now attend church in the nearby town of Springdale.

=== Fire department ===
The community of Beachside has a volunteer fire department with 7 volunteers. The firefighters are contacted by telephone when a fire occurs. The department is equipped with a ½ ton pickup which is used as a fire truck. There is a sufficient amount of fire hydrants in the community. They are equipped with hoses and pumps, and breathing apparatuses. This fire department is not the only one that will respond, however. Fire Departments in Little Bay and Springdale are contacted as well to provide more adequate firefighting capabilities.

=== Water supply and sanitation ===
The community's source of water is a gravity flow chlorinated treated water from Long pond. 100% of the households are connected to main water supply. 55 of the households use public sewage system, the remainder have private septic tanks. Garbage is collected once a week. The community's dump is located 2 km away.
