= St Patricks, Newfoundland and Labrador =

Human settlement in Canada

Coordinates: 49.5752°N 55.985°W

Location of St. Patrick's in Newfoundland and Labrador

St. Patricks is a local service district and designated place in the Canadian province of Newfoundland and Labrador.

== Geography ==
St. Patricks is in Newfoundland within Subdivision C of Division No. 8.

== Demographics ==
As a designated place in the 2016 Census of Population conducted by Statistics Canada, St. Patricks recorded a population of 31 living in 20 of its 26 total private dwellings, a change of -31.1% from its 2011 population of 45. With a land area of 1.38 km^{2} (0.53 sq mi), it had a population density of 22.5/km^{2} (58.2/sq mi) in 2016.

== Government ==
St. Patricks is a local service district (LSD) that is governed by a committee responsible for the provision of certain services to the community. The chair of the LSD committee is Gerald Bennett.

== See also ==
- List of communities in Newfoundland and Labrador
- List of designated places in Newfoundland and Labrador
- List of local service districts in Newfoundland and Labrador
