= Springdale, Newfoundland and Labrador =

Springdale Wolf Cove
- Town
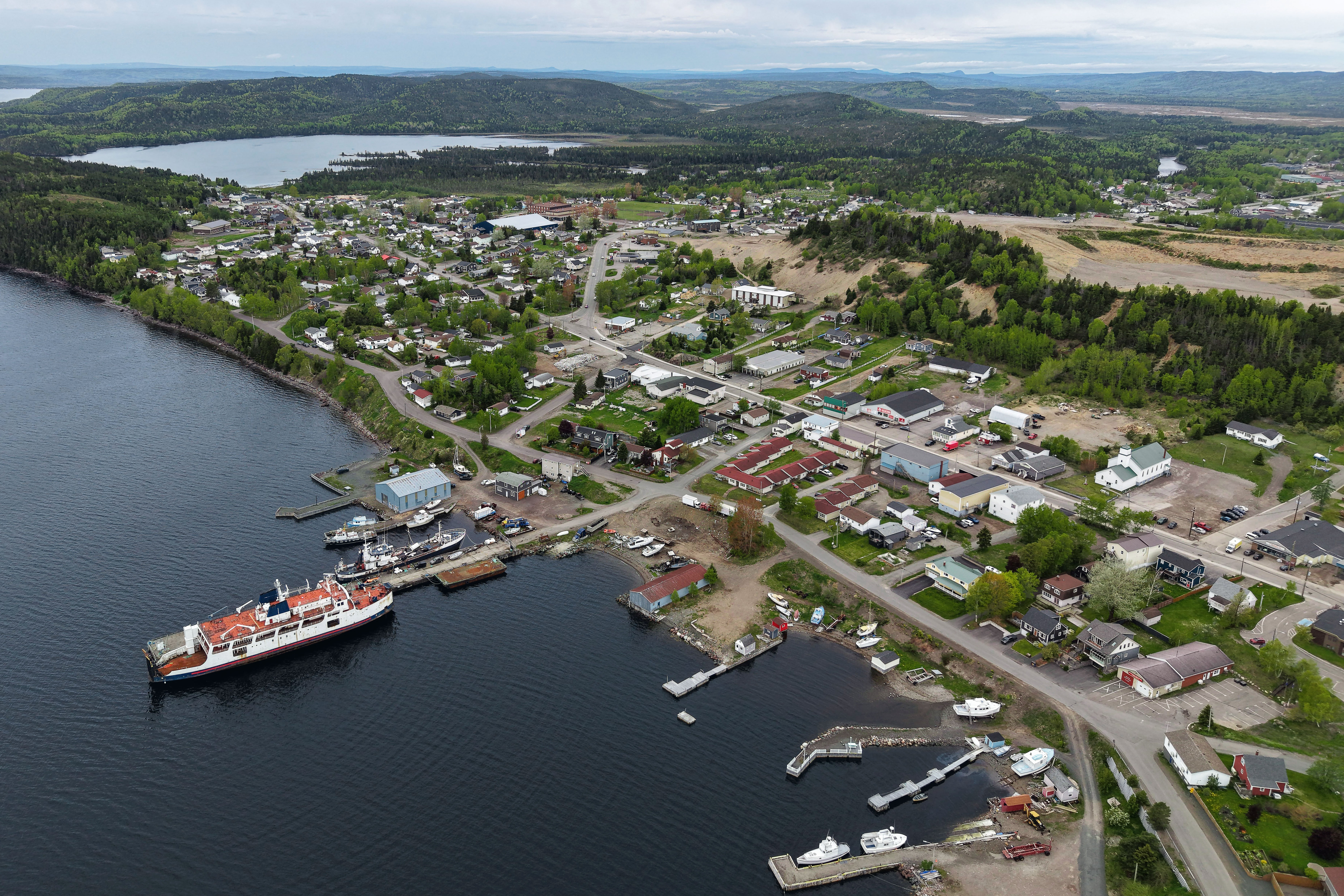
- Aerial view (2026)

- Seal

- Location of Springdale in Newfoundland
- Coordinates: 49°29′N 56°06′W
- Country: Canada
- Province: Newfoundland and Labrador
- Settled: 1877

Government
  - Mayor: Jenna Young-Blanchard

Area
  - Urban: 17.60 km^{2} (6.80 sq mi)

Population (2021)
  - Town: 2,965
- Time zone: UTC-3:30 (Newfoundland Time)
  - Summer (DST): UTC-2:30 (Newfoundland Daylight)
- Area code: 709
- Highways: Route 390; Route 392
- Website: Springdale official site

Springdale is a town in Newfoundland and Labrador, Canada, which had a population of 2,965 people in 2021, up from 2,764 in the Canada 2006 Census. The community is located on the Northwestern shores of Hall's Bay in Central Newfoundland, near the mouth of Indian River.

One of the largest towns in north-central Newfoundland, the town hosts the Springdale Braves (male) and the Springdale Bravettes (female) hockey teams. They also host the Springdale Bluefins swim team. The town has a small harbour, a hospital, and many recreational facilities. These facilities include a hockey rink, curling club, skatepark, tennis courts, a soccer pitch and softball field. Springdale is known as the "hub" of Green Bay, and provides services to a number of communities in the Green Bay North and Green Bay South areas. The town boasts a number of chain restaurants in addition to locally owned ventures. The current mayor of Springdale is Jenna Young-Blanchard.

Springdale has two schools: Indian River Academy, which houses students from Kindergarten to Grade 6, and Indian River High School, which serves students in Grades 7-12. On the outskirts of town is Glassy Beach, which is known for its smooth pieces of broken glass that can be safely walked across in bare feet.

== History ==
The Springdale area was first inhabited by aboriginal peoples, including the Beothuk and Mi'kmaq; further, there is evidence to suggest that the Dorset and Maritime Archaic Indians also spent time there.

Hall's Bay takes its name from an ill-fated ship captain who, along with his crew, was killed and decapitated by a group of Beothuk in the mid-18th century. According to local lore, the heads of Captain Hall and his crewmen were found on top of wooden pikes stuck in the ground along the coast of the bay. Like most communities in this region, Springdale is home to many legends centred on the Beothuk people.

The first recorded European settler was Nicholas Peters who, in 1877, constructed a sawmill on Mill Island, near the mouth of Indian River, and approximately 200 metres off the shore of present-day Springdale. There are several families living in Springdale today who are his direct descendants (with the surnames of Peters or Young), some of whom live on 'Peters Lane'. This sawmill attracted other settlers, and buildings were soon constructed on the "mainland," across from Mill Island, in a sheltered area called Wolf Cove. In fact, "Wolf Cove" remained the name of the settlement for a number of years. The sawmill was eventually sold to the Curtis Brothers of Twillingate, and was destroyed by fire in 1890. After the blaze, settlers ceased to live on Mill Island, and moved to Wolf Cove.

In Wolf Cove, there was a freshwater spring that served as a source of water for residents; in 1897, the community took this spring as its namesake, officially changing "Wolf Cove" to "Springdale". This spring still stands near the waterfront, but has since been covered up because of poor water quality due to pollution from a nearby industry.

The Mainmast Museum is home to hundreds of artifacts from Hall's Bay's past, some of which date back to the 18th century. The museum is located on the waterfront in Springdale.

The H.C. Grant Heritage Museum is a Municipal Heritage Building (c. 1917-20) on the Canadian Register of Historic Places.

The Springdale Heritage Society tells of the history of Springdale and the surrounding area. It is housed in the refurbished courthouse, originally built in the mid-1950s.

In 2018, Springdale received national attention after the town council voted 4–3 against installing an LGBT pride crosswalk.

Since 2018, the former provincial ferry MV Capt. Earl W. Winsor has been laid up at a private wharf in Springdale; flooding aboard the vessel prompted a Canadian Coast Guard response in 2024.

== Climate ==
Springdale has a humid continental climate (Koppen: Dfb), with mild to warm summers and chilly winters. Precipitation is reliable year round but peaks in the months of August, October and November.

Climate data for Springdale
Month	Jan	Feb	Mar	Apr	May	Jun	Jul	Aug	Sep	Oct	Nov	Dec	Year
Record high °C (°F)	12 (54)	14 (57)	15.6 (60.1)	22 (72)	28.3 (82.9)	33.3 (91.9)	35.5 (95.9)	33.9 (93.0)	31.7 (89.1)	22.8 (73.0)	18.9 (66.0)	15 (59)	35.5 (95.9)
Mean daily maximum °C (°F)	−2.8 (27.0)	−2.8 (27.0)	1.3 (34.3)	5.1 (41.2)	11.4 (52.5)	18.1 (64.6)	22.6 (72.7)	21.3 (70.3)	16.3 (61.3)	10.3 (50.5)	5.1 (41.2)	−0.3 (31.5)	8.8 (47.8)
Daily mean °C (°F)	−8 (18)	−8.3 (17.1)	−3.8 (25.2)	1 (34)	6.4 (43.5)	12.1 (53.8)	16.8 (62.2)	15.7 (60.3)	10.9 (51.6)	5.8 (42.4)	1.3 (34.3)	−4.8 (23.4)	3.8 (38.8)
Mean daily minimum °C (°F)	−13.4 (7.9)	−14 (7)	−9.1 (15.6)	−3.2 (26.2)	1.2 (34.2)	5.9 (42.6)	10.9 (51.6)	10.1 (50.2)	5.5 (41.9)	1.3 (34.3)	−2.5 (27.5)	−9.4 (15.1)	−1.4 (29.5)
Record low °C (°F)	−35 (−31)	−40.6 (−41.1)	−36 (−33)	−20 (−4)	−15 (5)	−5 (23)	−1.1 (30.0)	−1.1 (30.0)	−3.9 (25.0)	−12.8 (9.0)	−24 (−11)	−32.2 (−26.0)	−40.6 (−41.1)
Average precipitation mm (inches)	81.8 (3.22)	66 (2.6)	74.9 (2.95)	63.7 (2.51)	75.4 (2.97)	89.1 (3.51)	78.2 (3.08)	103.9 (4.09)	85.1 (3.35)	108.6 (4.28)	97.3 (3.83)	86.2 (3.39)	1,010.3 (39.78)
Source: 1961-1990 Environment Canada

== Demographics ==
In the 2021 Census of Population conducted by Statistics Canada, Springdale had a population of 2,965 living in 1,285 of its 1,424 total private dwellings, a change of −0.2% from its 2016 population of 2,971. With a land area of 17.46 km^{2} (6.74 sq mi), it had a population density of 169.8/km^{2} (439.8/sq mi) in 2021.

== Notable people ==
- Natasha Henstridge (born 1974), actress and former model

== See also ==
- List of cities and towns in Newfoundland and Labrador
