= List of ghost towns in Newfoundland and Labrador =

The following is a list of known abandoned communities in Newfoundland and Labrador, Canada.

== A ==
- Aaron Cove
- Aaron Island
- Abbate Point
- Abbott Cove
- Adnavik
- Aillik
- Alexander Bay Station
- Allan Cove
- Amelia Cove
- American Cove
- American Point
- Amos Cove
- Anderson's Cove
- Ann's Cove, Burin
- Anstey's Cove
- Antelope
- Anthony Island
- Apsey Cove
- Apsey Point
- Aquiller
- Archie Campbell's Cove
- Ariege Bay
- Assizes Harbour
- Athlone

== B ==
- Baccalieu Island
- Bachelor's Cove
- Back Cove, Labrador
- Back Shore
- Baie de Loutre
- Bait Cove
- Bake Apple Bight
- Baker's Cove
- Baker's Head
- Baker's Tickle
- Bakers Brook
- Bald Head
- Bald Nap
- Baldwin Cove
- Balena
- Bane Harbor
- Bar Haven
- Bar Point
- Barachois
- Barge Bay
- Barren Island
- Barrett's Siding
- Barrocks
- Barrow
- Barrow Harbour
- Barrow Islands
- Bassitt's Harbour
- Bat's Path End
- Bateau Cove
- Batteau
- Battle Harbour
- Bay d'Est (Bay de East)
- Bay de L'Eau
- Bay de L'Eau Island
- Bay de Loup
- Bay des Vieux
- Bay du Nord, Fortune Bay
- Bay du Nord, Hermitage Bay
- Bay of Chaleur
- Bayly's Cove
- Bear Brook
- Bear Cove
- Bear Island
- Beaver Cove
- Beaverton
- Belldown's Point
- Betts Cove
- Big Brook
- Black Duck Cove, Trinity Bay
- Black Island, Bay of Exploits
- Black Island, Friday Bay
- Blanchard
- Blow me Down, Conception Bay
- Bluff Head Cove
- Bobby's Cove, Green Bay
- Bobby's Cove, Notre Dame Bay
- Bollard Town
- Bolster's Rock
- Bottle Cove
- Bradley's Cove
- Bragg's Island
- Brake's Cove
- Brazils
- British Harbour
- Broad Cove
- Broom Close
- Brown's Cove
- Brown's Cove, Sound Island
- Brunette
- Burnt Arm
- Burnt Island
- Burnt Island Tickle
- Burton's Pond

== C ==
- Cambriol
- Canada Harbour
- Cape Island
- Cape La Hune
- Cape Roger Harbour
- Cape St. Charles
- Carrol Cove
- Castle Cove, near Keels
- Chateau Bay
- Chimney Cove
- Chimney Tickle (Labrador)
- Clattice Harbour
- Colinet Islands
- Comfort Bight
- Coney Arm
- Connaigre
- Conne
- Coppett
- Corbin, Burin Peninsula
- Corbin, Fortune Bay
- Crawleys Island
- Cul-de Sac East
- Cul-de Sac West
- Current Island

== D ==
- Daniel's Cove
- Dantzig
- Darby's Harbour
- Davis Cove
- Davis Inlet
- Deep Cove
- Deep Harbour
- Deer Harbour
- Deer Island, Bonavista Bay
- Deer Island, South Coast
- Delby's Cove
- Doctor's Harbour
- Dog Cove
- Domino
- Dragon
- The Droke
- Duricle

== E ==
- East Bay, Newfoundland and Labrador
- East St. Modeste
- Emily Harbour
- Exploits

== F ==
- Facheux Bay
- Fair Island
- Femme
- Fischells
- Fischot Island
- Fisher's Cove
- Flat Head
- Flat Islands, Bonavista Bay
- Flat Islands, Placentia Bay
- Flatrock, Conception Bay
- Flowers Island
- Foote's Cove (Newfoundland)
- Ford's Harbour
- Fox Island Harbour
- Fortune
- Frenchman's Island
- Fry's Cove
- Furby's Cove (Newfoundland)

== G ==
- Gaff Topsails
- Garia
- George's Cove
- Goblin
- Goose Arm
- Gooseberry Cove, Placentia Bay
- Gooseberry Island
- Grand Bruit
- Grand John
- Great Bona
- Great Brule
- Great Harbour Deep
- Great Jarvis
- Great Jervis
- Great Paradise
- Green Island
- Grey Islands
- Grole

== H ==
- Harbour Buffett
- Harbour Island
- Haystack
- Hebron
- Henley Harbour
- Hodderville
- Hooping Harbour
- Horse Islands
- Hunt's Island

== I ==
- Indian Burying Place
- Indian Harbour
- Indian Islands
- Indian Pond
- Indian Tickle
- Iona
- Ireland's Eye
- Island Cove
- Isle Valen
- Ivanhoe

== J ==
- Jemmy's Cove
- Jersey Harbour
- Jigging Cove
- Jigging Hole, near Dunfield
- John's Pond
- Julie's Harbour
- Junction Brook

== K ==
- Kerley's Harbour
- King's Cove, District of Fortune Bay and Hermitage
- Kings Cove, Labrador
- Kings Cove, Northern Peninsula
- Kings Cove, Notre Dame Bay
- Kingwell

== L ==
- La Manche
- Lally Cove
- Lancaster
- Langue de Cerf
- L'Anse-au-Diable
- Lears Cove
- Little Bay
- Little Bay Islands
- Little Bay West
- Little Bona
- Little Canada Harbour
- Little Colinet Island
- Little Fogo Islands
- Little Harbour, Placentia Bay
- Little Harbour, Trinity Bay
- Little Harbour Deep
- Little Paradise
- Little Placentia Sound
- Little Port
- Lobster Cove
- Lobster Harbour
- Lockesporte
- Locks Cove
- Lomond
- Long Point
- Loreburn

== M ==
- Mansfield Point
- McDougall's Gulch
- Merasheen
- Mercer's Cove
- Miller's Passage
- Mooney's Cove
- Mosquito
- Muddy Hole

== N ==
- Nachvak
- New Harbour, Fortune Bay
- Newell's Island
- Newport
- North West Arm
- Nutak

== O ==
- Oderin
- Okak
- Osmond
- Otterbury

== P ==
- Paddock's Bight
- Parsons Harbour
- Pass Island
- Patrick's Harbour
- Pays Cove
- Peddle's Point
- Penguin Arm
- Petites
- Piccaire
- Pinchard's Island
- Placentia Junction
- Point Crewe
- Point Enragée
- Popes Harbour
- Port Anne
- Port Elizabeth
- Port Nelson
- Port Royal
- Presque
- Prowseton
- Puddingbag Cove
- Pumbley Cove
- Pushthrough

== Q ==
- Quarry

== R ==
- Ramah
- Random Head Harbour
- Raymond's Point
- Red Cove
- Red Island
- Red Rocks
- Rencontre West
- Richard's Harbour
- Rider's Harbour
- Rogue's Harbour
- Rose au Rue
- Rosedale
- Roti Point
- Round Harbour
- Roundabout
- Ryle's Barrisway

== S ==
- Saddle Island
- Safe Harbour
- Sagona
- Sailor's Island
- St. Anne's
- St. John Harbour
- St. Jones Without
- St. Joseph's
- St. Josephs Cove
- St. Kyran's (Newfoundland)
- St. Leonard's
- Samson Island
- Sandy Cove, Fogo Island
- Sandy Point
- Shambler's Cove
- Siding at Georges Lake
- Silver Fox Island
- Smooth Cove
- Snook's Arm
- Sooley's Cove
- Sop's Island
- Sound Island
- Southwest Croque
- Spencers Cove
- Spirity Cove
- Spotted Island
- Spout Cove
- Spread Eagle
- Stanley Cove
- Stanleyville
- Stepaside
- Stone Valley
- Stone's Cove
- Swells Cove

== T ==
- Table Bay
- Tack's Beach
- Taylor's Bay
- Tea Cove
- Thoroughfare
- Three Arms
- Tickle Beach
- Tickles
- Tilt Cove
- Tim's Harbour
- Toslow
- Trammer
- Trinny Cove
- Turnip Cove

== V ==
- Voy's Beach (now part of the Town of Humber Arm South)

== W ==
- Wandsworth
- Webber's
- Wellman's Cove
- West Point
- Western Arm
- Western Cove
- Western Head
- White Rock
- Wild Cove, Fogo Island
- Wild Cove, northern peninsula
- Williamsport
- Winter House Cove
- Woodford's Cove
- Woods Island
- Woody Island
- Wreckhouse

== Z ==
- Zoar

== See also ==
- List of ghost towns in Canada
