= The Ryans and the Pittmans =

Popular folk song of Newfoundland and Labrador, Canada

"The Ryans and The Pittmans" is a popular Newfoundland folk song. It tells of the romantic entanglements of a sailor named Bob Pittman, and his desire to sail home to finally marry his "sweet Biddy". The song is also known as "We'll Rant and We'll Roar", after the first line of the chorus; however, this is also the name by which some foreign variants are known.

It is based on a traditional English capstan shanty, "Spanish Ladies", which describes headlands sighted on a sailor's homeward voyage through the English Channel. "Spanish Ladies" has a number of variants: New England whalers sang of "Yankee Whalermen", while their Pacific counterparts sang of Talcuhano Girls. A more landlocked drover's version surfaced in Australia as "Brisbane Ladies".

Verses 2, 8, 9, and 10 of the Newfoundland version are adapted from that of the whalers; the remainder were composed around 1875 by Henry W. LeMessurier. It was printed in Old Songs of Newfoundland (1912) by James Murphy. The places mentioned in the song are outports in and around Placentia Bay, Newfoundland.

The most famous recent version of the song was recorded by Great Big Sea.

Episode 6 of season 2 (2011) of Republic of Doyle is named "The Ryans and the Pittmans".

== Text and music ==
My name it is Robert, they call me Bob Pittman
I sail in the Ino with Skipper Tom Brown
I'm bound to have Polly or Biddy or Molly
As soon as I'm able to plank the cash down.

Chorus
We'll rant and we'll roar like true Newfoundlanders
We'll rant and we'll roar on deck and below
Until we see bottom inside the two sunkers
When straight through the Channel to Toslow we'll go.

I'm a son of a sea cook, and a cook in a trader
I can dance, I can sing, I can reef the mainboom,
I can handle a jigger, and cuts a fine figure
Whenever I gets in a boat's standing room.

Chorus

If the voyage is good, this fall I will do it
I wants two pounds ten for a ring and the priest
A couple of dollars for clean shirts and collars
And a handful of coppers to make up a feast.

Chorus

There's plump little Polly, her name is Goldsworthy
There's John Coady's Kitty and Mary Tibbo
There's Clara from Brule and young Martha Foley
But the nicest of all is me girl from Toslow.

Chorus

Farewell and adieu to ye girls of Valen
Farewell and adieu to ye girls in the Cove
I'm bound to the westward, to the wall with the hole in
I'll take her from Toslow the wide world to rove.

Chorus

Farewell and adieu to ye girls of St. Kyran's
Of Paradise and Presque, Big and Little Bona
I'm bound unto Toslow to marry sweet Biddy
And if I don't do so I'm afraid of her da'.

Chorus

I've bought me a house from Katherine Davis
A twenty pound bed from Jimmy McGrath
I'll get me a settle, a pot and a kettle
And then I'll be ready for Biddy, hurrah!

Chorus

O, I brought in the Ino this spring from the city,
Some rings and gold brooches for the girls in the Bay;
I bought me a case-pipe – they call it a meerschaum –
It melted like butter upon a hot day.

Chorus

I went to a dance one night at Fox Harbour,
There were plenty of girls, so nice as you'd wish;
There was one pretty maiden a-chewin' of frankgum
Just like a young kitten a-gnawing fresh fish.

Chorus

Then here is a health to the girls of Fox Harbour
Of Oderin and Presque, Crabbes Hole and Brule
Now let ye be jolly, don't be melancholy
I can't marry all or in chokey I'd be.

Chorus

== See also ==
- List of Newfoundland songs
