= List of tickles =

Tickle is used in the name of several geographical features in Canada; in Newfoundland English it means a short narrow strait:

- Baccalieu Tickle, navigation channel just off the coast of Baccalieu Island, Newfoundland and Labrador, Canada
- Baker's Tickle, Canadian fishing settlement in the Burgeo, Newfoundland and Labrador, Canada
- Black Tickle, settlement in Newfoundland and Labrador on the Island of Ponds, Canada
- Boatswain Tickle within Little Bay Islands, town in Newfoundland and Labrador, Canada
- Chimney Tickle, settlement in Newfoundland and Labrador, Canada
- Greenspond Tickle, on the northeast coast of the Island of Newfoundland, Canada, called Bonavista North
- Gull Tickle, channel located in Newfoundland and Labrador, Canada
- Indian Tickle, located north of Comfort Bight
- Moore's Island Tickle, south of Moore's Harbor in the Okak Islands, Newfoundland and Labrador, Canada
- Thimble Tickle, former name of Glovers Harbour, settlement in Newfoundland and Labrador, Canada
- Tickle Bay, natural bay off the island of Newfoundland in the province of Newfoundland and Labrador, Canada
- Tickle Channel, narrow channel in the south part of Hanusse Bay, separating Hansen Island from the east extremity of Adelaide Island, Canada
- Tickle Cock Bridge, pedestrian underpass in Castleford, England, under a railway line originally built by the York and North Midland Railway
- Tickle Cove, settlement located north west of Catalina, Canada
- Tickle Harbor or Subdivision 1A, Newfoundland and Labrador, unorganized subdivision on the Avalon Peninsula in Newfoundland and Labrador, Canada

== See also ==
- Tickles, Newfoundland and Labrador, small settlement
- Leading Tickles, town in Newfoundland and Labrador
- Tickle (disambiguation)
- Tickle (surname)
