= Parsons Harbour, Newfoundland and Labrador =

Ghost town in Newfoundland, Canada

Coordinates: 47°36′00″N 56°39′00″W

Parsons Harbour or New Harbour is a ghost town located east of Cape La Hune on Newfoundland's Hermitage Bay. The post office was established in 1951, with Freeman LaFosse as first postmaster.

== See also ==
- List of ghost towns in Newfoundland and Labrador
