= McCallum, Newfoundland and Labrador =

McCallum
- Local service district / designated place
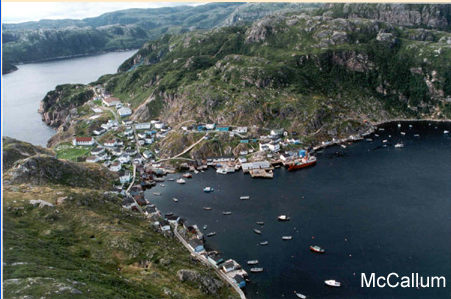
- McCallum

- Location of McCallum in Newfoundland
- Coordinates: 47°37′52″N 56°13′45″W
- Country: Canada
- Province: Newfoundland and Labrador
- Census division: 3
- Settled: c. 1800s

Government
  - Type: Local Service District

Population (2021)
  - Total: 45
- Time zone: UTC– 3:30 (Newfoundland Time)
  - Summer (DST): UTC– 2:30 (Newfoundland Daylight)
- Postal Code: A0N 2J0
- Area code(s): 709 & 846-XXXX
- Highways: Passenger Ferry to Hermitage-Sandyville

McCallum is a local service district and designated place in the Canadian province of Newfoundland and Labrador. McCallum is located on the southern coast of the island of Newfoundland. It is accessible only by boat or by air, and in appearance and way of life is thought by some to be as close to a pre-20th century community as may be found. McCallum lies in an enclosed harbour and is sheltered between two hills. The community survives primarily on the fishery. Whaling was also a major industry in the late 19th century. The provincial government runs a ferry service to McCallum from the nearby town of Hermitage, about an hour and a half away by boat, where the nearest road is located. The town had a population of 45 in the 2021 Census.

== History ==
McCallum takes its name from Sir Henry Edward McCallum, Colonial Governor of Newfoundland and Labrador from 1899 to 1901.

The waters around McCallum have been fished since at least the 16th century, however no permanent settlement existed until after the Seven Years' War, after 1816. When the French gained possession of the Islands of Saint Pierre and Miquelon, the English on the Islands were forced to find new homes, and looked just north, to Newfoundland's southern coast.

It was during this time that Captain James Cook was appointed marine surveyor of Newfoundland, and mapped out in detail the coastline and waters around McCallum to create a boundary for where the French were still allowed to fish.

Aside from the traditional fishery, there is also a lobster fishery.

In recent years there has also been aquaculture in and around the community of McCallum. The lifeblood of McCallum revolves around the sea.

McCallum voted on resettlement in 2015 and 2017 but did not meet the 90% threshold required.

In 2025, a CBC report regarding McCallum stated that the population had decreased to approximately 20. The report also profiled the graduation of the only student left at St. Peter’s All Grade. The school has no projected enrolment and no reason to open next year.

== Geography ==
McCallum is in Newfoundland within Subdivision D of Division No. 3. As a result of resettlement, the community has grown and has taken in people from surrounding communities such as Pushthrough, Muddy Hole, Indian Cove, Lock's Cove, Richards Harbour, Great Jervais and Mosquito.

== Demographics ==
As a designated place in the 2021 Census of Population conducted by Statistics Canada, McCallum recorded a population of 45 living in 21 of its 44 total private dwellings, a change of −38.4% from its 2016 population of 73. With a land area of 1.82 km^{2} (0.70 sq mi), it had a population density of 40.1/km^{2} (103.9/sq mi) in 2016.

== Government ==
McCallum is a local service district (LSD) that is governed by a committee responsible for the provision of certain services to the community. The chair of the LSD committee is Everett Durnford.

== Infrastructure ==
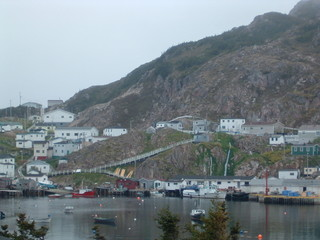
McCallum on overcast day

McCallum has a public wharf, a fire department, a bed-and-breakfast, local internet access, a passenger ferry service to Hermitage (where the nearest road is located), and distance education facilities. There is only one general store, Fudges Store. The church is St Peter's Anglican, and the school is St Peter's All Grade School. The school is small containing only three students in 2020, this further dropped to one student by 2025. The school is projected to have no enrolment in 2025-2026. Distance education was a popular means of education for the high school students (grades 9 to 12).

There are now more than four ATV's used for various jobs in the community, such as garbage pickup, hauling freight, and bringing groceries to the shop. Also, ATVs have become popular for residents needing to get various jobs done quicker. Snowmobiles are popular in winter.

== See also ==
- Hermitage Bay
- List of communities in Newfoundland and Labrador
- List of designated places in Newfoundland and Labrador
- List of local service districts in Newfoundland and Labrador
- Resettlement (Newfoundland)
