= Western Cove =

Western Cove may refer to

- Western Cove, Newfoundland and Labrador, a community in Canada
- Western Cove, a body of water in Nepean Bay, South Australia
