= Barachois (disambiguation) =

Barachois is a coastal lagoon separated from the ocean by a sand bar.

Barachois may also refer to:

- Barachois, Newfoundland and Labrador, a hamlet on the Labrador coast of Canada
- Barachois, a community in Percé, Quebec, Canada
  - Barachois station in Barachois
- The Barachois, a lake of Cape Breton Regional Municipality, Nova Scotia, Canada.
- Barachois (band), an Acadian folk band of Canada

== See also ==
- Barachois Brook, Newfoundland and Labrador, a town on Newfoundland, Canada
- Barachois Harbour, a community in Nova Scotia, Canada
- Barachois Pond Provincial Park, along the west coast of Newfoundland and Labrador, Canada
- Grand Barachois, a lake on the Saint Pierre and Miquelon territory of France off the coast of Newfoundland
- Grand-Barachois, New Brunswick, a Canadian Rural Service District since amalgamated into Beaubassin Est
