= Cape Roger Harbour, Newfoundland and Labrador =

Cape Roger Harbour
- Abandoned Community
- Location of Cape Roger Harbour in Newfoundland
- Coordinates: 47°22′56.3″N 54°44′25.6″W
- Country: Canada
- Province: Newfoundland and Labrador
- Census division: Division 2
- Census subdivision: Division 2

Population (1845)
  - Total: 4
- Time zone: UTC-3:30 (Newfoundland Time)
  - Summer (DST): UTC-2:30 (Newfoundland Daylight)
- Area code: 709
- Bay: Placentia Bay

Cape Roger Harbour (sometimes known as Cape Roger) is a tiny abandoned town located near St. Joseph's, Placentia Bay in Newfoundland and Labrador, Canada that had a tiny population of 4 in 1845. Despite only being sparsely inhabited, the harbour has been used since the early 19th century for the fishery, particularly that of the herring and salmon fishery.

== Geography ==
Located on the western side of Placentia Bay, Cape Roger Harbour is within Cape Roger Bay which lies between St. Joseph's, Placentia Bay and Port Anne. Cape Roger Harbour, which is protected from the elements by Harbour Island, is bounded by water spouts that rush through the sandy loam that lies on the beach area. They can consistently rise above 10 feet over sea level.

== Buried Treasure ==
It is a popular belief that buried treasure is located within Cape Roger Harbour, however all attempts to unearth it have failed.

== See also ==
- Oderin Island (Newfoundland and Labrador)
- Petite Forte, Newfoundland and Labrador
