= Toslow =

Fishing community in Newfoundland

- Fishing Village
- Location of Toslow in Newfoundland
- Coordinates: 47°23′57.42″N 54°30′45.10″W
- Country: Canada
- Province: Newfoundland and Labrador

Population (2021)
  - Total: 0
- Time zone: UTC-3:30 (Newfoundland Time)
  - Summer (DST): UTC-2:30 (Newfoundland Daylight)
- Area code: 709

Toslow is a resettled fishing community in Placentia Bay on the island of Newfoundland in the Canadian province of Newfoundland and Labrador. The village was located in a natural harbour called Presque Harbour. According to J. P. Howley, the name is believed to be a corruption of the French for silver cup (tasse de l'argent) because "the little harbour is cup-like, and the quartz in the rocky cliffs give it a silver-like appearance".

In the 1836 census there were 21 people and in 1845 it had a population of 26. It was a prosperous community where all of the residents made a living in the fishing industry. By 1901 there were three lobster factories in the community.

The community has gained renown from the very familiar Newfoundland ballad of The Ryans and the Pittmans (also known as We'll Rant and We'll Roar). The song mentions many of the surrounding communities such as Isle Valen, Oderin and Little Bona amongst many others.

Toslow is also the subject of another popular Newfoundland ballad, Out from St. Leonard's where it graphically describes the plight of the residents as they were forced into resettlement. The chorus verse of the song is as follows:

And it's out from St. Leonard's and out from Toslow,
They'd steam cross the bay with their houses in tow.
With their beds in the bow and their stoves in the stern,
Bound away with their sons and their daughters.

— Words By: Gary O'Driscoll, song: Out from St. Leonard's

== See also ==
- List of cities and towns in Newfoundland and Labrador
