= Rose au Rue, Newfoundland and Labrador =

Abandoned whaling town in Canada

Rose au Rue Rosiru
- Abandoned Whaling Town
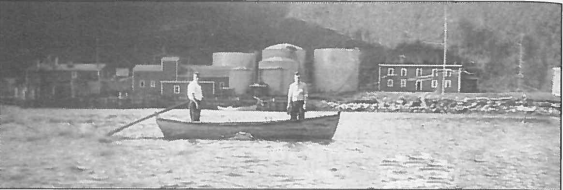
- Rose au Rue Whaling Station, 1942

- Location of Rose au Rue in Newfoundland
- Coordinates: 47°31′00″N 54°10′57″W
- Country: Canada
- Province: Newfoundland and Labrador
- Census division: Division 1
- Census subdivision: Subdivision B

Population (1945)
  - Total: 5
- Time zone: UTC-3:30 (Newfoundland Time)
  - Summer (DST): UTC-2:30 (Newfoundland Daylight)
- Area code: 709
- Bay: Placentia Bay

Rose au Rue (sometimes spelled Rosiru) is an abandoned whaling town in Newfoundland and Labrador, Canada that had a small population of 11 in 1891.

== Geography ==
Rose au Rue was located on the east coast of Merasheen Island, a large island in the middle of Placentia Bay. It was located in a small cove which is sheltered by the adjacent Rose au Rue Island. A nearby place was Port Royal.

== History ==
Rose au Rue was a major whaling station in Newfoundland for most of the first half of the twentieth century. Its name is presumed to have originated with a French name, roche roux (purple rocks), which cover the island.

The first recorded family to have lived in Rose au Rue was the family of Matthew Lake and Anne Tibbo whose son John Lake was born there in 1842 according to parish records compiled by the well-known Father Cacciola of Bar Haven. However, it was first noted as officially settled by a single family in 1884 and was likely regularly used as a fishing outpost for families from Port Royal.

In 1901 the Newfoundland Steam Whaling Co. commenced operations and shortly thereafter began to build a whale factory at Rose au Rue which was open by 1902. It was in full operation by 1904, and processed 700 whales in the next decade. Rose au Rue whaling station would be occupied by no less than four companies over the course of its use. The Newfoundland Whaling Co. and its successors seasonally employed as many as 100 men from Merasheen, the Ragged Islands and Port Royal, accommodating them in bunkhouses. Over the course of its use, over 2000 whales were processed at the station for total run of 25 seasons.

In 1910, the Bowring Brothers bought the whaling station and operated it under the name Rosiru Whaling Co. until 1915 when devastation hit the local whale economy in the form of low whale stocks and whale oil prices. Between the period 1915 and 1923, the whaling station lay dormant, leaving little hope it would return. In the midst of this time, in 1921, the family of Lawrence Murphy of Port Royal lived on the island. The whaling station was subsequently reopened by Norwegian Captain Amund Anonsen of the Newfoundland Whaling Company tumultuously and ultimately declaring bankruptcy twice during the period up until 1937. For two years after 1937, the Newfoundland Whaling Company partnered with Salveston's Polar Whaling Company who eventually bought out the Newfoundland Whaling Company for $300,000 in late 1939. Seeing its eventual fate, Salveston's sold the Rose au Rue operations to Captain Olaf Olsen the following year. Norwegian Captain Olaf Olsen took great interest in the station as he was a former directory of the Newfoundland Whaling Company and operated it under the business Marine Oils Company until 1944 when the Rose au Rue stationed was devastated by fire. The remnants of Rose au Rue station was dismantled and much of the equipment moved to Olsen's station in Williamsport on the Great Northern Peninsula. After the last family moved out of Rose au Rue in the late 1940s, the occasional fisherman has had a cabin at Rose au Rue.

Rose au Rue and its whaling station was mentioned in the popular Newfoundland folk song 'Rocks of Merasheen' by prolific songwriter Al Pittman.

== Demographics ==
Prior to the construction of the whaling station on the island, there are sporadic entries for Rose au Rue, which small population may have been included in the larger near communities of Port Royal or Indian Harbour and was first recorded as settled in 1884. In 1891, the population was said to be 11 people consisting of two families all of the Roman Catholic faith. In the following years, after the station opened in 1902, the only year-round occupants for most of the 20th century were maintenance men for the factory.

In 1921, the family of Lawrence and Lucy Murphy lived on Rose au Rue year round.

In 1936, Newfoundland Directories released a business directory that lists the head of each household with their occupation in the whaling town of Rose au Rue at that time. It is adapted below:

1936 Business Directory
Flynn, Frank	Labourer
Williams, Samuel	Fisherman
Williams, William	Caretaker

The last known residents were the family of fisherman Chesley Ingram who were last recorded at Rose au Rue in 1946.

== See also ==
- Port Royal, Newfoundland and Labrador
- Merasheen Island
