= Bald Head, Newfoundland and Labrador =

Ghost town in Newfoundland and Labrador

Bald Head is a ghost town in Newfoundland and Labrador. It is located within Division No. 1, Placentia Bay.

The closest inhabited settlement to Bald Head is the Town of Long Harbour-Mount Arlington Heights.

== See also ==
- List of ghost towns in Newfoundland and Labrador
