= Antelope, Newfoundland and Labrador =

Antelope
- Unincorporated community
- Country: Canada
- Province: Newfoundland and Labrador
- Time zone: UTC-4 (Atlantic Time)
  - Summer (DST): UTC-3 (Atlantic Daylight Time)
- Area code: 709

Antelope is a former hamlet on Strait of Belle Isle, on the Labrador coast. The nearest port of call was Henley Harbour.

== See also ==
- List of ghost towns in Newfoundland and Labrador
