= Cul De Sac West, Newfoundland and Labrador =

Settlement in Newfoundland and Labrador, Canada

Coordinates: 47.549°N 56.842°W

Location of Cul De Sac West in Newfoundland

Cul De Sac West was a settlement in Newfoundland and Labrador.

Aviron Bay is located nearby.

== See also ==
- List of ghost towns in Newfoundland and Labrador
