= Bay du Nord, Hermitage Bay, Newfoundland and Labrador =

Coordinates: 47.8524348°N 56.1634174°W

Location of Bay du Nord in Newfoundland and Labrador

Bay du Nord is an abandoned community in Hermitage Bay, Newfoundland and Labrador.

== See also ==
- List of ghost towns in Newfoundland and Labrador
