= Great Paradise =

Ghost town in Newfoundland and Labrador

Great Paradise, simply refereed to as Paradise is a ghost town in Newfoundland and Labrador. Great Paradise is located on Long Peninsula, Division No. 2.

== Background ==
In the late 1600s it is believed that the French established a fishing stating in Paradise Harbour; however, they left Placentia Bay following the Treaty of Utrecht.

In the late 1700s, the Saunders and Sweetman firm had a large outpost in Great Paradise.

By 1810, the population had reached 214. By 1816, Great Paradise was the second largest community in the bay, with a winter population of 310, and a summer population of 460; Placentia was the largest community in the bay.

Saunders and Sweetman would find themselves caught up in financial difficulty, and had to concentrate more effort towards the eastern, more populous side of the bay. As a result of this, the population at Great Paradise declined, and many moved to different communities in the surrounding area. The 1836 census recorded a total of 76 people living there.

Great Paradise's population was 197 in 1921, but many poor years in the fishery over the course of the 1920s led to a decline. Many moved away in the 1930s for the Commission of Government settlements, and in the 1940s, many more found work in the Argentia Naval Base. The community was officially Resettled in the mid-1960s.

== See also ==
- List of ghost towns in Newfoundland and Labrador
