= Doctor's Harbour =

Ghost town in Newfoundland and Labrador

Doctor's Harbour is a ghost town in Newfoundland and Labrador. It is located within Division No. 3, Fortune Bay.

Most services could not be provided in Doctor's Harbour due to its size. These services would be provided in the Town of Belleoram, across the bay.

Some still travel to the location because of its natural beauty as one of the "South Coast Fjords", a geographical region spanning from Hermitage Bay to Cape Ray.

In 1935, The community had a recorded population of 31 in the 1935 census.

== See also ==
- List of ghost towns in Newfoundland and Labrador
