= List of shipwrecks in October 1887 =

The list of shipwrecks in October 1887 includes ships sunk, foundered, grounded, or otherwise lost during October 1887.

== 1 October ==
List of shipwrecks: 1 October 1887
Ship	State	Description
Arctic	United Kingdom	The whaler was lost in the Cumberland Gulf. Her 21 crew survived.
Stewart Freeman	Canada	The full-rigged ship collided with the schooner Enterprise (United Kingdom) off Barry, Glamorgan, United Kingdom and was severely damaged. Stewart Freeman was on a voyage from Cardiff, Glamorgan to Rio de Janeiro Brazil. She was taken in to Penarth, Glamorgan.

== 2 October ==
List of shipwrecks: 2 October 1887
Ship	State	Description
Clydach	United Kingdom	The steamship collided with the steamship Benamain (United Kingdom) and sank 8 nautical miles (15 km) south west of Sandhammer, Sweden. Clydach was on a voyage from Rostock, Germany to Härnösand, Sweden.

== 3 October ==
List of shipwrecks: 3 October 1887
Ship	State	Description
Eaglet	United Kingdom	The smack foundered in the Horse Channel, off the coast of Denbighshire. Her crew survived. She was on a voyage from Liverpool, Lancashire to Nefyn, Caernarfonshire.
Havana	United States	The schooner sank in a gale 3 miles from saint Joseph, Michigan. Her Captain and 2 crewmen died. 4 crew rescued by "Hannah Sullivan" (United States). Wreck located in 1895.

== 4 October ==
List of shipwrecks: 4 October 1887
Ship	State	Description
California	United States	The steamship foundered in Lake Michigan off Gros Cap, Michigan with the loss of sixteen lives.
Mary Blundell	United Kingdom	The barque caught fire in the Yarra River, Victoria.

== 5 October ==
List of shipwrecks: 5 October 1887
Ship	State	Description
Hedvig	Sweden	The ship departed from the River Tyne for Bornholm, Denmark. No further trace, reported missing.
Zoe	United Kingdom	The fishing smack was run into by the steamship Grenadier (United Kingdom) and sank in the North Sea 50 nautical miles (93 km) off the mouth of the Humber. Her five crew were rescued by Grenadier.

== 6 October ==
List of shipwrecks: 6 October 1887
Ship	State	Description
Platon	Greece	The brig was run into by St. Louis (Flag unknown) and sank at Kertch, Russia.
Santa Andrea	Italy	The barque was destroyed by fire at Carboneras, Spain.

== 7 October ==
List of shipwrecks: 7 October 1887
Ship	State	Description
Christine	Sweden	The schooner collided with the steamship Christian IX (Denmark) and sank. Her crew were rescued.

== 8 October ==
List of shipwrecks: 8 October 1887
Ship	State	Description
Hoffnung	Germany	The barque was run down by Essequibo (Flag unknown) and sank in the English Channel off Start Point, Devon, United Kingdom with some loss of life.

== 9 October ==
List of shipwrecks: 9 October 1887
Ship	State	Description
Spahis	France	The steamship ran ashore and was wrecked on "La Formigue de Bourmes", off the coast of Var with the loss of 22 lives.
Sleipner	Denmark	The schooner sank in the North Sea 260 nautical miles (480 km) off Spurn Point, Yorkshire, United Kingdom. Her crew were rescued by the smack Moniteur (United Kingdom). Sleipner was on a voyage from Rotterdam, South Holland, Netherlands to Aalborg.

== 10 October ==
List of shipwrecks: 10 October 1887
Ship	State	Description
Jules et Marie	France	The ship ran aground, capsized and sank at Padstow, Cornwall, United Kingdom with the loss of a crew member.

== 11 October ==
List of shipwrecks: 11 October 1887
Ship	State	Description
Dolphin	United Kingdom	The ship was run into by the barque Crummock Water (United Kingdom) and sank in the English Channel off Dungeness, Kent. Her crew were rescued by Crummock Water.
Escurial, and Georgian	Flag unknown United Kingdom	The steamship Escurial collided with the steamship Georgian in the River Thames at Rosherville, Kent. She was on a voyage from Zakynthos, Greece to London. She was beached at Tilburyness, Essex but was refloated and taken in to Tilbury, Essex. Georgian sank. She was on a voyage from London to Antwerp, Belgium. Georgian was refloated on 27 October. She was towed in to London the next day.
George W. Beale	United States	The fishing steamship was sunk in a collision with a tug in the East River near the Brooklyn Bridge, New York City. A crew member was reported missing.
IJmuiden	Netherlands	The barque was abandoned in the North Sea. Her crew were rescued by the fishing boat Reval (Flag unknown). IJmjuiden was on a voyage from IJmuiden, North Holland to Vyborg, Grand Duchy of Finland.
Jantje	Flag unknown	The galiot was abandoned in the North Sea. Her crew were rescued by the smack Boy Ernest (United Kingdom). Jantje was on a voyage from London to Oldenburg, Germany.
Venice	United Kingdom	The schooner ran aground on the Maplin Sands, in the North Sea off the coast of Essex, at a position north west of the Mouse Lightship ( Trinity House). An offer of assistance from the Clacton Lifeboat was refused.

== 12 October ==
List of shipwrecks: 12 October 1887
Ship	State	Description
Ascalon	United Kingdom	The ship was wrecked on the Hidacore Rocks, 14 nautical miles (26 km) north of Galle, Ceylon. Her 32 crew survived. She was on a voyage from Aden, Aden Governorate to Calcutta, India.
Marmion	United Kingdom	The steamship sprang a leak and sank off the Isle of Bute. She was on a voyage from Maryhill, Renfrewshire to the Isle of Arran.
Onward	Sweden	The schooner was driven ashore and wrecked at Thisted, Denmark. She was on a voyage from Swansea, Glamorgan, United Kingdom to Stockholm.

== 13 October ==
List of shipwrecks: 13 October 1887
Ship	State	Description
Elizabeth	United Kingdom	The fishing sloop was damaged by fire at Sutton Pool, Devon.
Salvatore Massa	Italy	The barque was abandoned in the Atlantic Ocean. Her thirteen crew were rescued by the steamship Arecuna (United Kingdom). Salvatore Massa was on a voyage from Lisbon, Portugal to New York, United States.

== 14 October ==
List of shipwrecks: 14 October 1887
Ship	State	Description
Victis	United Kingdom	The schooner was driven ashore at Whitstable, Kent.

== 15 October ==
List of shipwrecks: 15 October 1887
Ship	State	Description
Dagny	Flag unknown	The ship was driven ashore at Cleethorpes, Lincolnshire, United Kingdom. Her crew were rescued. She was on a voyage from Neder Kalix, Sweden to Hull, Yorkshire, United Kingdom.
Heidahl	Norway	The brig was driven ashore at the Vrouwepolder, Zeeland, Netherlands. Her crew were rescued. She was on a voyage from Christiania to Ostend, Belgium.

== 16 October ==
List of shipwrecks: 16 October 1887
Ship	State	Description
Augusta	Sweden	The 850 ton barque foundered in the Atlantic Ocean with the loss of the captain and eight seamen. Augusta was on a voyage from Swansea, Glamorgan to Aspinwall, Colombia. Reports differ as to which ship rescued the six survivors on 24 October. One source says they were rescued by the barque Gerson (Denmark), another reports they were taken to New York by the barque Union.
Kameruka	United Kingdom	The steamship was wrecked on the Pedro Rocks, off Moruya Heads, New South Wales.

== 17 October ==
List of shipwrecks: 17 October 1887
Ship	State	Description
Fides	Denmark	The schooner was lost off Mamanguape, Brazil. She was on a voyage from Macau to Porto Alegre, Brazil.

== 18 October ==
List of shipwrecks: 18 October 1887
Ship	State	Description
Bellona	United Kingdom	The barque capsized and sank at Mauritius. She was refloated in late November.
Douro	United Kingdom	The tug was run into by the steamship African (United Kingdom) and sank at Rotherhithe, Surrey.
L. T. Billinger	United States	The canal boat, under the tow of Oswego (United States) sank off Newburgh, New York. Her captain and his wife, asleep in their cabin, drowned.
Planteur	Germany	The barque collided with the steamship Upapa (United Kingdom) and sank in the English Channel 4 nautical miles (7.4 km) off Beachy Head, Sussex, United Kingdom with the loss of eleven of the thirteen people on board. Survivors were rescued by Upapa. Planteur was on a voyage from London to Cardiff, Glamorgan, United Kingdom and Buenos Aires, Argentina.
Polly	United Kingdom	The Thames barge was run into by the tug Mosquito (United Kingdom) and sank in the River Thames at Erith, Kent. Polly was on a voyage from Rochester, Kent to Putney, Surrey.

== 19 October ==
List of shipwrecks: 19 October 1887
Ship	State	Description
Cheviot	Victoria	Cheviot The steamship ran aground in Port Philip Bay and was wrecked with the loss of 35 lives.
Four Brothers	United States	The schooner was abandoned in the Gulf of Mexico south south west of Panama City, Florida(29°30′N 86°00′W).
Sara F. Bird	United States	The schooner was wrecked 1 nautical mile (1.9 km) east of the mouth of the Perdido River.

== 21 October ==
List of shipwrecks: 21 October 1887
Ship	State	Description
Unnamed	Flag unknown	The barque ran aground on the Longsand, in the North Sea off the coast of Essex, United Kingdom.

== 22 October ==
List of shipwrecks: 22 October 1887
Ship	State	Description
Midge	United Kingdom	The yawl foundered 1 nautical mile (1.9 km) east of Lymington, Hampshire. She was refloated on 9 November and towed in to Cowes, Isle of Wight. She was placed under repair.

== 23 October ==
List of shipwrecks: 23 October 1887
Ship	State	Description
City of Owen Sound	Canada	The steamship struck a sunken rock and foundered in Georgian Bay off the Clapperton Lighthouse, Ontario. Her crew were rescued.
Delaware	United States	The steamship was beached in a storm near Hammond Bay, Michigan Straits and declared a total loss. Sunsequently refloated, rebuilt and returned to service as Charles B. Hill.
Francis Henry	United Kingdom	The ship departed from Comfort Bight, Labrador, Newfoundland Colony for Gibraltar. No further trace, reported missing.
Laketon	United States	The steamer ran aground and sank in a gale in Lake Superior. Seven of her crew were rescued. Raised 6 August, 1888.

== 24 October ==
List of shipwrecks: 24 October 1887
Ship	State	Description
Meliora	United Kingdom	The ketch was driven ashore at Cullen, Moray. Her crew were rescued by rocket apparatus. She was on a voyage from Methil, Fife to Stornoway, Isle of Lewis, Outer Hebrides.
Perseverance	United Kingdom	The smack foundered off the north Devon coast.
Sibylla	United Kingdom	The steamship departed from Malta for Rotterdam, South Holland, Netherlands. No further trace, reported overdue.

== 25 October ==
List of shipwrecks: 25 October 1887
Ship	State	Description
Frigga	United Kingdom	The ship was abandoned in the North Sea. Her crew were rescued by the smack Our Boys (United Kingdom). Frigga was on a voyage from Caen, Calvados, France to Fredrikstadt.. She was subsequently taken in to Ramsgate, Kent, United Kingdom.
Striver	United Kingdom	The fishing smack, under tow of the tug Tasmania (United Kingdom) collided with a brig and sank at Great Yarmouth, Norfolk.

== 26 October ==
List of shipwrecks: 26 October 1887
Ship	State	Description
Ada and Ethel	New South Wales	The schooner was wrecked 10 nautical miles (19 km) south of the Seal Rocks, New South Wales.
Arken	Norway	The brig sprang a leak and sank in the North Sea 12 nautical miles (22 km) south west of Smith's Knowl, off the coast of Norfolk, United Kingdom. Her crew were rescued by the smack Figet (United Kingdom). Arken was on a voyage from Cowes, Isle of Wight to Leith, Lothian, United Kingdom.
Flaminian	United Kingdom	The ship ran aground at "Burgar Deressi", Ottoman Empire. She was on a voyage from Liverpool, Lancashire to Constantinople, Ottoman Empire.
Protector	Norway	The brig ran aground and was wrecked at Troon, Ayrshire, United Kingdom. Her crew survived. She was on a voyage from Stranraer, Wigtownshire to Ayr, United Kingdom.

== 27 October ==
List of shipwrecks: 27 October 1887
Ship	State	Description
Flying Hawk	United Kingdom	The tug was driven ashore on Dalkey Island, County Dublin.
Swift	United Kingdom	The ship collided with Dundee (United Kingdom) and sank in the North Sea off Flamborough Head, Yorkshire. Her captain was reported missing. Swift was on a voyage from Sunderland, County Durham to Poole, Dorset.

== 28 October ==
List of shipwrecks: 28 October 1887
Ship	State	Description
Princess of Wale	United Kingdom	The ship was sighted off Portland, Dorset whilst on a voyage from Swansea, Glamorgan to Saint-Valery-sur-Somme, Somme, France. No further trace, reported overdue.

== 29 October ==
List of shipwrecks: 29 October 1887
Ship	State	Description
Vernon	United States	Sonar image of the wreck of Vernon, 12 June 2022. During a westward voyage from Frankfort, Michigan, the 158.7-foot (48 m), 694.94-gross register ton steamship foundered in a gale in Lake Michigan east of Two Rivers, Wisconsin, with the loss of all but one of the 40 to 50 people on board. The lone survivor was rescued after 60 hours on a raft. The wreck lies in the Wisconsin Shipwreck Coast National Marine Sanctuary at 44°12.125′N 087°24.738′W at a depth of 210 feet (64 m) except for the pilot house and deck superstructure, which lie west of the rest of the wreck in 160 feet (49 m) of water.
Von Peter	Norway	The barque was driven ashore in Rocquaine Bay, Guernsey, Channel Islands. A crew member was reported missing.

== 30 October ==
List of shipwrecks: 30 October 1887
Ship	State	Description
Flaxmoss	United Kingdom	The steamship was abandoned in the English Channel 10 nautical miles (19 km) off the Isle of Wight. Her crew were rescued by the barque Neptunus (Netherlands). Flaxmoss was on a voyage from Guernsey, Channel Islands to London.
Helena	United Kingdom	The sloop was driven ashore and wrecked at Dunkirk, Nord with the loss of four of the six people on board. Survivors were rescued by a fishing vessel.
Pride of the Sea	United Kingdom	The lugger was driven ashore and wrecked at Shanklin, Isle of Wight with the loss of all six crew.
Ranger	United Kingdom	The pilot cutter was driven onto Ryde Pier, Isle of Wight.
Robert	United Kingdom	The barque sank in the River Thames at Swanscombe, Kent.
Sydney	United Kingdom	The barque sank in the River Thames at Swanscombe.
Thomas and Sarah	United Kingdom	The Thames barge foundered in the River Thames at Gravesend, Kent. Her crew were rescued.
Yarra	United Kingdom	The excursion boat foundered in the Solent west of Ryde Pier.
Unnamed	United Kingdom	The yacht foundered in the English Channel off Portland, Dorset with the loss of ten of the twelve people on board.
Unnamed	United Kingdom	The barge foundered off Sheerness, Kent with the loss of all hands.

== 31 October ==
List of shipwrecks: 31 October 1887
Ship	State	Description
Black Diamond	United Kingdom	The steamship caught fire at Sunderland, County Durham.
Flower of May	United Kingdom	The schooner foundered in Morecambe Bay. Three crew were rescued.
Murial	United Kingdom	The ship became stranded on the breakwater at Kertch, Russia.
Persia	United States	The ship ran aground at "Port Phillippe". She was on a voyage from New York to Port Phillippe. She was later refloated.
Unnamed	Austria-Hungary	The brigantine ran aground at "Galea".

== Unknown date ==
List of shipwrecks: Unknown date in October 1887
Ship	State	Description
Adam Smith	United Kingdom	The steamship ran aground at Trouville-sur-Mer, Calvados, France.
Adriana	Flag unknown	The steamship collided with the steamship Valdemar (Denmark) and sank at "Pyk Tabak", Belgium.
Agnar	Norway	The barque sprang a leak and sank in the North Sea 100 nautical miles (190 km) off Great Yarmouth, Norfolk, United Kingdom. Her crew were rescued. She was on a voyage from Grimsby, Lincolnshire, United Kingdom to Christiania.
Agnes Otto	United Kingdom	The steamship ran aground at Gibraltar.
Albertina	United Kingdom	The steamship was driven ashore. She was on a voyage from Odense, Denmark to Luleå, Sweden. Albertina was refloated and taken in to Copenhagen, Denmark in a severely leaky condition. She was placed under repair.
Allegheny	United States	The ship was driven ashore. She was refloated and taken in to Boston, Massachusetts in a leaky condition.
Angela	Austria-Hungary	The brig was destroyed by fire at Constantinople, Ottoman Empire. She was on a voyage from Odesa, Russia to Marseille, Bouches-du-Rhône, France.
Axel	Denmark	The schooner was driven ashore and wrecked at Gothenburg, Sweden. She was on a voyage from Antwerp to Holbæk.
Baltic	Sweden	The barque ran aground at "Singo".
Bertha	United Kingdom	The brig was abandoned in the Atlantic Ocean. Her crew were rescued by the schooner Fontes Pereira de Mello (Portugal). Bertha was on a voyage from London to Porto Alegre, Brazil.
Bothal	United Kingdom	The steamship was damaged by fire at Charleston, South Carolina, United States. She was on a voyage from Charleston to Bremen, Germany.
Capella	Sweden	The steamship was abandoned in the North Sea. Her crew were rescued by the schooner Moscow (Denmark). Capella was on a voyage from Ghent, East Flanders, Belgium to Nyköping.
Caroline	Norway	The full-rigged ship was abandoned in the North Sea. She was subsequently towed in to Terschelling, Friesland, Netherlands.
Caura	Belgium	The barque was destroyed by fire at sea before 16 October. She was on a voyage from Liverpool, Lancashire, United Kingdom to Valparaíso, Chile.
Charlotte	Norway	The schooner was abandoned at sea. She was on a voyage from Charlestown, Cornwall, United Kingdom to Stege, Denmark. She was subsequently towed in to Gothenburg by the steamship Prins Oscar (Sweden).
Christine	Norway	The ship ran aground at Rhyl, Denbighshire, United Kingdom. She was on a voyage from Halifax, Nova Scotia, Canada to Rhyl.
Condor	United Kingdom	The steamship was driven ashore at Colonia del Sacramento, Uruguay. Her crew were rescued.
Dessoug	United States	The steamship arrived at Savannah, Georgia on fire.
Diligent	France	The schooner was driven ashore at Wells-next-the-Sea, Norfolk.
Earl of Jersey	United Kingdom	The ship ran aground 30 nautical miles (56 km) west south west of the mouth of the Karnaphuli River.
Elena	Germany	The barque was driven ashore in the Savannah River.
E. T. Killman	Sweden	The steamship ran aground at "Gallandsodde", Denmark. She was on a voyage from Aarhus, Denmark to a Baltic port.
Frisia	Netherlands	The barque was towed in to Swinemünde, Germany in a waterlogged condition by the steamship Oscar (Russia. Frisia was on a voyage from Sundsvall, Sweden to Harlingen, Friesland.
Galatz	France	The steamship was driven ashore on "Island Aspro".
Gustav Adolph	Germany	The schooner ran aground on the Kaloot Bank, in the North Sea off the coast of Zeeland, Netherlands. She was later refloated and resumed her voyage.
Gustave Adolph	Norway	The barque ran aground on the English Bank, in the River Plate, and was abandoned by her crew.
Gylfe	United Kingdom	The ship arrived at Quebec City, Canada from Liverpool on fire. She was scuttled.
Haabet	Norway	The brig was driven ashore at IJmuiden, North Holland, Netherlands. Her crew were rescued. She was on a voyage from Havre de Grâce, Seine-Inférieure, France to Fredrikstadt.
Hebe	Flag unknown	The ship was driven ashore and wrecked on Brion Island, Quebec. Her crew were rescued. She was on a voyage from the River Plate to Gaspé, Quebec.
Hector	United Kingdom	The ship ran aground at Sevastopol, Russia.
Henriette	Germany	The brig was driven ashore and wrecked at Gothenburg. She was on a voyage from Conway, Caernarfonshire, United Kingdom to Copenhagen.
Henry	United Kingdom	The schooner struck a sunken rock and was beached at Rossport, County Mayo.
Hetty	United Kingdom	The steamship was driven ashore at Vieux Point, Seine-Inférieure.
Hiskelina	Germany	The galiot was driven ashore at Thisted, Denmark. She was on a voyage from Bremen to Reval, Russia. She was a total loss.
Horation	United Kingdom	The steamship caught fire at Hamburg, Germany.
Hugenden	United Kingdom	The steamship caught fire at Savannah, Georgia.
Jane	United Kingdom	The schooner was driven ashore and wrecked at Grainthorpe, Lincolnshire.
Johanne Margaretha	Germany	The galiot was driven ashore at Lemvig, Denmark.
John	Norway	The schooner collided with the steamship Regalia (United Kingdom) and was severely damaged. John was on a voyage from Härnösand, Sweden to Alloa, Clackmannanshire, United Kingdom. She put in to Helsingør, Denmark.
John Hanna	United Kingdom	The ship was driven ashore at Felixtowe, Suffolk.
John P. Best	United Kingdom	The steamship ran aground in the Scheldt at "Pyp Tabak", Belgium. She was refloated with the assistance of eight tugs and taken in to Antwerp, Belgium.
King's Lynn	United Kingdom	The ship an aground in the Elbe. She was on a voyage from Boston, Lincolnshire to Hamburg.
Knight Companion	United Kingdom	The full-rigged ship was driven ashore at Dunkirk, Nord, France. She was refloated on 31 October and taken in to Dunkirk.
Leopoldo	Italy	The ship arrived at Buenos Aires, Argentina from Glasgow, Renfrewshire, United Kingdom on fire. She was scuttled.
Livingstone	(Canada)	The ship was wrecked on the English Bank, in the River Plate. Her crew were rescued.
Ljuba	Russia	The barque was wrecked west of Skagen, Denmark. Her crew were rescued. She was on a voyage from Goole, Yorkshire, United Kingdom to Gävle, Sweden.
Lofoten	Norway	The brig was driven ashore and severely damaged at Egmond aan Zee, North Holland. She was on a voyage from Shoreham-by-Sea, Sussex, United Kingdom to Laurvig.
Lorely	Germany	The brig foundered at sea. Her crew were rescued.
Louise	Germany	The schooner collided with Metapedia (Flag unknown) and sank.
Loyal, and the Traverse Lightship	United Kingdom; Trinity House	The Traverse Lightship was run into by Loyal and sank. Loyal was on a voyage from Quebec City to Cardiff, Glamorgan. She was beached at Saint-Roch, Quebec.
Maranhao	France	The barque was driven ashore and wrecked at Salina, Brazil.
Marion	United Kingdom	The steamship was driven ashore in the Savannah River. She was later refloated and resumed her voyage.
Marouysa	Russia	The steamship ran aground in the Danube at "Koopanitza", Romania.
Mathilde	Denmark	The schooner was driven ashore on Rogoe Island. She was on a voyage from Lappohja, Grand Duchy of Finland to "Veile".
Moya	Sweden	The barque was driven ashore at Ronehamn, Gotland and was severely damaged. She was refloated and taken in to Visby, Gotland.
Naier	United Kingdom	The steamship was driven ashore in the Savannah River.
Naples	United Kingdom	The steamship caught fire at Savannah, Georgia United States.
New Brunswick	Canada	The ship was abandoned in the Atlantic Ocean. Her crew were rescued. She was on a voyage from Quebec City to Liverpool.
Nicholas Harvey	United Kingdom	The ship was abandoned in the Bay of Biscay and was set afire. Her crew were rescued by the barque Nadeshda (Russia). Nicholas Harvey was on a voyage from Penarth, Glamorgan to Rio de Janeiro, Brazil.
Niord	Norway	The brig was wrecked at Lemvig. She was on a voyage from London, United Kingdom to Laurvig.
Nordpol	Denmark	The steamship ran aground at Maassluis, South Holland, Netherlands. She was on a voyage from Saint Petersburg, Russia to Rotterdam, South Holland.
Orion	Norway	The brig was driven ashore at Thisted. She was on a voyage from Newhaven, Sussex to Svelvig. She was a total loss.
Panama	United States	The ship was driven ashore at Cape Canaveral, Florida. She was on a voyage from New York to Havana, Cuba.
Patriot	Norway	The brig was driven ashore and wrecked on Ameland, Friesland. Her crew were rescued. She was on a voyage from Dokkum, Friesland to Dram.
Penair	United Kingdom	The Hayle brigantine became a total loss at Hogland Island, Finland. Two seamen drowned.
Plutos	Norway	The barque was wrecked in the Atlantic Ocean. Her crew were rescued.
Polly Preston	United Kingdom	The ship ran aground on the Gunfleet Sand, in the North Sea off the coast of Essex. She was on a voyage from Aberdeen to London. She was refloated and taken in to Harwich, Essex in a severely leaky condition.
Resolute	United Kingdom	The steamship caught fire at Savannah, Georgia.
Salient	United Kingdom	The steamship collided with the pier at Livorno, Italy and was severely damaged.
Samarang	Norway	The barque was abandoned at sea. Her crew were rescued by the barque Rhine (Norway).
Scotia	United Kingdom	The steamship was driven ashore at "Dohanasian", Ottoman Empire. She was on a voyage from Taganrog, Russia to Malta.
Shamrock	United Kingdom	The schooner ran aground on the East Hoyle Bank, in Liverpool Bay, and sank. Her crew were rescued by the Hoylake Lifeboat. She was on a voyage from Bangor, Caernarfonshire to Runcorn, Cheshire. Shamrock was refloated on 21 October but consequently sank in the River Dee.
Silvia	United Kingdom	The steamship caught fire at Savannah, Georgia.
Sophie	Norway	The brig was driven ashore at Callantsoog, North Holland. Her crew were rescued. She was on a voyage from Dram to the Nieuwe Diep.
Spey	United Kingdom	The steamship was driven ashore in the White Sea. She was refloated and taken in to Bodø, Norway in a leaky condition.
St. Brelade	(United Kingdom of Great Britain and Ireland) Jersey	The ship was driven ashore and wrecked near Gaspé.
Sylph	United Kingdom	The Yorkshire Billyboy was driven ashore 3 1/2 nautical miles (6.5 km) north of Skegness Pier, Lincolnshire. She was on a voyage from London to Goole.
Tauros	United Kingdom	The steamship was driven ashore and wrecked at Hasle, Bornholm, Denmark. She was on a voyage from Danzig, Germany to Dunkirk.
Telegraf	Norway	The barque was driven ashore and wrecked on Ameland, Friesland. Her crew were rescued.
Thorn Holme	United Kingdom	The ship was driven ashore. She was on a voyage from Montreal, Quebec to Sydney, Nova Scotia. She was refloated and towed in to Quebec City.
Thorwaldsen	Norway	The barque was abandoned off the Isla de Flores, Uruguay on or before 5 October.
Thurso	United Kingdom	The steamship ran aground at Högänas, Sweden. She was on a voyage from Liverpool to Stettin, Germany.
Waava	Russia	The schooner was driven ashore and wrecked on Ameland. Her crew were rescued.
Walker	United Kingdom	The tug collided with the tug Flying Owl (United Kingdom) and sank off Little Cumbrae, Ayrshire with the loss of a crew member. Survivors were rescued by Flying Owl.
Wilhelmine	Norway	The steamship was driven ashore at Lemvig. She was on a voyage from "Evensen" to Fredrikstadt.
Unnamed	(Ottoman Empire) Egypt	The felucca was run down and sunk in the Suez Canal by Poseidon (flag unknown).
Unnamed	Flag unknown	The ship was driven ashore on the Hadston Skeers, Northumberland, United Kingdom.
