= Broad Cove =

Broad Cove may refer to:

- Broad Cove, Newfoundland and Labrador, Canada
- Broad Cove (southern shore), Newfoundland and Labrador, Canada
- Small Point – Adam's Cove – Blackhead – Broad Cove, Newfoundland and Labrador, Canada
- Broad Cove, Lunenburg County, Nova Scotia, Canada
