= Broad Cove, Newfoundland and Labrador =

Coordinates: 47°34′46″N 54°12′39″W

Broad Cove is on King's Island, Placentia Bay, Newfoundland, Canada. It was one of five communities on King's Island; the others were: Tack's Beach, Best Harbour, Baker's Cove, Cooper's Cove and Yaulis Cove. All the communities had the same postal address, which was "Tacks Beach, Placentia Bay, Newfoundland".

The main activity of the community was fishing for cod and lobster. Broad Cove was also the site of a herring factory owned by H.C. Brown that packed herring for the West Indies. The community also featured a large fish store with outside fish flakes for the natural curing of salted cod fish. At the herring factory wharf, salt, flour and coal were unloaded for the local market, and salt fish and or herring was picked up for export.

The Broad Cove on King's Island is distinct from the settlement of Broad Cove on Conception Bay, which is part of the town of Small Point-Adam's Cove-Blackhead-Broad Cove.
