= Allan Cove =

Coordinates: 47°42′6″N 56°18′4″W

- Unincorporated community
- Interactive map of Allan Cove
- Country: Canada
- Province: Newfoundland and Labrador
- Time zone: UTC-3:30 (Newfoundland Time)
  - Summer (DST): UTC-2:30 (Newfoundland Daylight)
- Area code: 709

Allan Cove is a cove and a former hamlet in the Canadian province of Newfoundland and Labrador. It is located on Newfoundland's south coast near McCallum.

== See also ==
- List of ghost towns in Newfoundland and Labrador
