= Bay de L'Eau Island, Newfoundland and Labrador =

Bay de L'Eau Island
Geography
- Location: Fortune Bay

Administration
- Canada
- Province: Newfoundland and Labrador
- District: Fortune Bay-Cape La Hune

Additional information
- Postal code: A0E 1Z0

Bay de L'Eau Island is an abandoned community in Fortune Bay in the province of Newfoundland and Labrador, Canada. In the 1921 census of Newfoundland the island had 43 inhabitants. In 1945 census of Newfoundland, the island had 42 inhabitants.

The island was vacated under the Evacuated Communities, 1974 Confirmation Order as part of Newfoundland and Labrador’s resettlement program.

== See also ==
- List of ghost towns in Newfoundland and Labrador
