= Bachelor's Cove =

Coordinates: 47°43′43″N 53°10′53″W

Bachelor's Cove was a hamlet on Valen Island in Newfoundland.

== See also ==
- List of ghost towns in Newfoundland and Labrador
