= Anstey's Cove =

Coordinates: 49°38′54″N 55°46′46″W

Ansteys Cove
- Ghost town
- Interactive map of Ansteys Cove
- Country: Canada
- Province: Newfoundland and Labrador
- Time zone: UTC-3:30 (Newfoundland Time)
  - Summer (DST): UTC-2:30 (Newfoundland Daylight)
- Area code: 709

Ansteys Cove is a former hamlet in the "Twillingate district", near Little Bay Islands, Newfoundland and Labrador, Canada.

== See also ==
- List of ghost towns in Newfoundland and Labrador
