= Anthony Island =

Anthony Island may refer to:

- Anthony Island, Newfoundland and Labrador, Canada
- Anthony Island (British Columbia), Queen Charlotte Islands, British Columbia, Canada
