= Aquiller =

Unincorporated community in Canada

- Unincorporated community
- Country: Canada
- Province: Newfoundland and Labrador
- Time zone: UTC-3:30 (Newfoundland Time)
  - Summer (DST): UTC-2:30 (Newfoundland Daylight)
- Area code: 709

Aquiller was a Canadian hamlet in the Fortune Bay District of the province of Newfoundland and Labrador.

The nearest post office was in Pushthrough in 1911.

== See also ==
- List of ghost towns in Newfoundland and Labrador
