= Archie Campbell's Cove =

Coordinates: 48.5498°N 58.7353°W

- Ghost town
- Interactive map of Archie Campbell's Cove
- Country: Canada
- Province: Newfoundland and Labrador

Population (1911)
  - Total: 40
- Time zone: UTC-3:30 (Newfoundland Time)
  - Summer (DST): UTC-2:30 (Newfoundland Daylight)
- Area code: 709

Archie Campbell's Cove was a Canadian fishing settlement in the "St. George District" of the province of Newfoundland and Labrador.

It was located 6 miles from Port au Port. It had a church and a school by 1911 with a population of 40.

== See also ==
- List of ghost towns in Newfoundland and Labrador
