= St. John Harbour =

Historic place in Newfoundland and Labrador

St. John Harbour is a historic place and ghost town on St. John Island, located in St. John Bay.

The book The Basque Coast of Newfoundland by Selma Barkham retells how St. John Harbour would have been used as a good anchorage point for Basque fishermen.
