= East St. Modeste =

Ghost town in Newfoundland and Labrador

- Interactive map of East St. Modeste

East St. Modeste is a ghost town in Newfoundland and Labrador. It is located in Pinware Bay, Labrador, Division No. 10.

It was settled sometime around the 1840s by three families.

The settlement was abandoned around the mid-late 1950s.

East St. Modeste was one of 6 Basque whaling stations on the Labrador Coast.

== See also ==
- List of ghost towns in Newfoundland and Labrador
