= Bay de Loup =

Coordinates: 47°40′N 57°31′W

Bay de Loup (French for 'Wolf Bay') is a small locality in the Canadian province of Newfoundland and Labrador, located northeast of Burgeo.

== See also ==
- List of ghost towns in Newfoundland and Labrador
