= Black Island, Bay of Exploits, Newfoundland and Labrador =

Coordinates: 49°32′4″N 54°58′15″W

Location of Black Island in Newfoundland and Labrador

Black Island is an abandoned community in Newfoundland and Labrador. Black Island is made up of two islands and the cemetery is on Little Black Island. According to the 1921 Census there were 153 people living there. This cemetery is very over grown. A number of stones have been broken.

== See also ==
- List of ghost towns in Newfoundland and Labrador
