= Aaron Cove =

Human settlement in Newfoundland and Labrador, Canada

Coordinates: 52°26′51″N 55°42′45″W

Aaron Cove (sometimes called Aaron's Cove) is the name of a bay and former community in Labrador in the province of Newfoundland and Labrador, Canada.

== See also ==
- List of ghost towns in Newfoundland and Labrador
