= Goblin, Newfoundland and Labrador =

Ghost town in Newfoundland and Labrador, Canada

Coordinates: 47°43′18″N 56°6′7″W

Location of Goblin in Newfoundland

Historical populations
Year	Pop.
1874	12
1911	40
1941	29
1951	36

Goblin was a small town located at the mouth of Bay D'Espoir on the south coast of Newfoundland and Labrador. The origin of the name is unknown but it may come from the rugged and mysterious terrain of the area or a nearby rock feature that resembles a goblin. The bay was the location of a seasonal cod fishery in the 18th century and was permanently settled in the 19th century. The population peaked around 40 in 1911. The town was abandoned between 1951 and 1956.

== See also ==
- List of communities in Newfoundland and Labrador
- List of ghost towns in Newfoundland and Labrador
