= Dantzig, Newfoundland and Labrador =

Canadian small town

Coordinates: 46°59′11″N 55°58′24″W

Location of Dantzig in Newfoundland

Dantzig (Also known as Dantzic or Danzick) was a small town on the tip of the Burin Peninsula in Newfoundland and Labrador, Canada. It was likely named after the city of Gdańsk (German: Danzig) in Poland. The population was reported as 29 in the 1869 census. The population had declined to just two families in 1928 and the town was abandoned soon after.

== See also ==
- List of communities in Newfoundland and Labrador
- List of ghost towns in Newfoundland and Labrador
