= Canada Harbour =

Abandoned community in Newfoundland and Labrador, Canada

Coordinates: 50.723°N 56.108°W

Location of Canada Harbour in Newfoundland and Labrador

Canada Harbour is an abandoned outport community in Newfoundland and Labrador. It was a French fishing station before 1857, settled by the English in 1860, and abandoned in 1969 during the resettlement program. Canada Harbour currently has 15 dwellings that are used as cottages during the summer months.

In the early 20th century, Canada Harbour had two small marble quarries under the operation of the Colonial Mineral & Trading Company, an English firm owned by William Edgar of Scotland; the marble was said to have been high-quality, but only one load of marble was ever shipped, and quarry operations soon closed, having been speculated to be caused by the shipping hazards of World War I. The load that was shipped, however, ended up in England. Many people still revisit the resettled outport community to this day.

Canada Harbour was established as a Roman Catholic community with the first church being built circa 1900 and a cemetery established just southwest of the church in the woods. In 1927 a new church was constructed and was later named Our Lady of Mount Carmel. The church was relocated in 1970 and was moved to Englee, Newfoundland during the Joey Smallwood era resettlement program, the church was floated by barge at a distance of about 3 miles. The church still stands today and has undergone some minor repairs over the years.

Censuses were taken in 1921, 1935, and 1945:

- 1921 Census of Newfoundland: Canada Harbour, St. Barbe District - 94 Individuals in 19 Households
- Newfoundland 1945 Census Canada Harbour, White Bay District
- Newfoundland 1935 Census Canada Harbour; http://ngb.chebucto.org/C1935/35-canada-hbr-wb.shtml
