= Random Head Harbour =

Settlement on Random Island, Newfoundland and Labrador

Random Head Lighthouse
- Location: Random Head; Random Island; Newfoundland; Canada
- Coordinates: 48°05′41″N 53°32′43″W

Tower
- Constructed: 1895
- Foundation: concrete base
- Construction: cast iron tower
- Height: 10 m (33 ft)
- Shape: cylindrical tower with balcony and lantern
- Markings: red and white checkered pattern, red lantern
- Power source: solar power
- Operator: Canadian Coast Guard
- Heritage: recognized federal heritage building of Canada

Light
- Focal height: 38 m (125 ft)
- Range: 7 nmi (13 km; 8.1 mi)
- Characteristic: Fl W 3s

Random Head Harbour is a settlement on Random Island, Newfoundland and Labrador. Random Head Harbour was formally inhabited, however, it is now a ghost town. Random Head Harbour is the location of the Random Head Lighthouse, a federally recognized heritage site.

== The Lighthouse ==
In 1894, a lighthouse and tower were under construction for a proposed site of Heart's Content. However, it was decided that the lighthouse and tower was to be erected off the largest of the Motion Islands at Random Head. In 1895, the lighthouse went into operation. The lighthouse officially stood at 10.4 meters (34 feet). On April 15, 1895, Thomas H. Cooper was appointed Keeper of the lighthouse. Cooper would serve in this role until 1905 when he passed away. Upon his passing, Thomas' son, George H. Cooper, would become the new Keeper.

In 1931, the fuel source for the light was changed to acetylene; George Cooper stepped down the same year. George's son, Thomas Henry Cooper, would stay as the lighthouse's caretaker until 1952. John Watton would also serve as caretaker through the 1960s; the lighthouse would convert to battery power during this time period. In 1990, the federal government officially recognized the lighthouse as a federal heritage building.

=== List of Keepers ===
- Thomas H. Cooper (1895–1904)
- George H. Cooper (1905–1931)
- Thomas Henry Cooper (1932–1952) (caretaker)
- John Watton (1960s (Note: possibly through the 1950s as well))
