= Cul De Sac East, Newfoundland and Labrador =

Human settlement in Canada

Coordinates: 47.552°N 56.853°W

Location of Cul De Sac East in Newfoundland

Cul De Sac East was a settlement in Newfoundland and Labrador.

== See also ==
- List of ghost towns in Newfoundland and Labrador
