= East Bay, Newfoundland and Labrador =

Ghost town in Newfoundland and Labrador

East Bay
- Ghost town
- Interactive map of East Bay
- Province: Newfoundland and Labrador
- Time zone: UTC-3:30 (Newfoundland Time)
  - Summer (DST): UTC-2:30 (Newfoundland Daylight)

East Bay is a ghost town in Newfoundland and Labrador. It is located in Division No. 3, in La Poile Bay.

== See also ==
- List of ghost towns in Newfoundland and Labrador
