= Back Shore =

Locality in Newfoundland and Labrador, Canada

Coordinates: 46°37′7.8″N 53°35′9.8″W

Back Shore is a locality in the Canadian province of Newfoundland and Labrador, located west of Cape Freels. The name was approved by the Newfoundland Geographical Names Board on July 29, 1982.

== See also ==
- List of ghost towns in Newfoundland and Labrador
