= St. Annes, Newfoundland and Labrador =

St. Annes Ann's Cove
- Unincorporated community
- Location of St. Annes in Newfoundland
- Coordinates: 47.43214°N 54.45738°W
- Country: Canada
- Province: Newfoundland and Labrador
- Time zone: UTC-3:30 (Newfoundland Time)
  - Summer (DST): UTC-2:30 (Newfoundland Daylight)
- Area code: 709

St. Annes is an unincorporated community in the Canadian province of Newfoundland and Labrador in Placentia Bay. It was originally known as Ann's Cove.

== Notable people ==
- Felix Collins, politician

== See also ==
- List of communities in Newfoundland and Labrador
