= Indian Pond =

Former settlement in Newfoundland and Labrador

- Former settlement
- Interactive map of Indian Pond
- Coordinates: 47°27′35″N 53°5′12″W
- Country: Canada
- Province: Newfoundland and Labrador

Population (last known record unknown)
  - Total: 0 (former settlement)
- Time zone: UTC−3:30 (Newfoundland Time)
  - Summer (DST): UTC−2:30 (Newfoundland Daylight Time)
- Area code: 709

Indian Pond was a settlement located northeast of Avondale, Newfoundland and Labrador. It had a population of 87 in 1956.

== See also ==
- List of ghost towns in Newfoundland and Labrador
