= Spirity Cove, Newfoundland and Labrador =

Ghost town in western Newfoundland and Labrador

Coordinates: 50°36′8″N 57°22′3″W

Location of Spirity Cove in Newfoundland

Historical populations
Year	Pop.
1884	8
1921	24*
1935	96*
1956	48
*Includes Kings Cove

Spirity Cove was a small town located at the mouth of Ingornachoix Bay on the west coast of Newfoundland and Labrador. The primary industry was fishing in the summer and logging in Hawkes Bay in the winter. The population of Spirity Cove and Kings Cove combined peaked at 96 in 1935. The community was resettled in 1966 but was still inhabited by two families until 1968. The area is still used for fishing and seasonal cabins.

== See also ==
- List of communities in Newfoundland and Labrador
- List of ghost towns in Newfoundland and Labrador
