= Bald Nap =

Coordinates: 48.114363°N 53.85959°W

Bald Nap is a former outport on Bay d'Espoir on the Canadian island of Newfoundland in the province of Newfoundland and Labrador.

It is located in the Trinity District. The Way Office was established in 1882 with the first Waymaster being William Guilliford.

== See also ==
- List of ghost towns in Newfoundland and Labrador
