= Tim's Harbour =

Ghost town in Newfoundland and Labrador

Tim's Harbour is a ghost town in Newfoundland and Labrador. It is located in Division No. 8, Subdivision L, Shaol Bay.

In the 1935 census, Tim's Harbour had a population of 24, with 3 family surnames, White, Troake, and Edwards.

== See also ==
- List of ghost towns in Newfoundland and Labrador
