= Balena =

Balena is a former settlement in the Fortune Bay District of the Canadian province of Newfoundland and Labrador.

Coastal ferries operated by the Reid-Newfoundland Company and the Newfoundland Produce Company made frequent calls there around 1911.

The first Postmaster was A.D. Neilson.

== See also ==
- List of ghost towns in Newfoundland and Labrador
