= Belldown's Point =

Coordinates: 49.9156°N 57.7871°W

Belldown's Point was near Cow Head. It had a population of 25 in 1941 and 52 in 1956.

== See also ==
- List of ghost towns in Newfoundland and Labrador
