= Batteau, Newfoundland and Labrador =

Vacated settlement in Newfoundland and Labrador, Canada

Batteau
- Abandoned settlement
- Interactive map of Batteau
- Coordinates: 53°24′34″N 55°46′46″W
- Country: Canada
- Province: Newfoundland and Labrador
- Settled: 1911

Population
  - Total: 0
- Time zone: UTC−3:30 (Newfoundland Standard Time)
  - Summer (DST): UTC−2:30 (Newfoundland Daylight Time)
- Type: Abandoned settlement

Batteau was a small fishing village on the Island of Ponds, off the southeastern coast of Labrador. It was a port of call for ships in 1911. The station was served by the C.N.R. Express after June 1953. The first post office opened on August 6, 1962 and the first Post Mistress was Stella Dyson. The community was later depopulated.

== See also ==
- List of ghost towns in Newfoundland and Labrador
