= Flat Islands, Placentia Bay, Newfoundland and Labrador =

Coordinates: 47.260°N 54.942°W

Location of Flat Islands in Newfoundland and Labrador

Flat Islands is an archipelago and resettled community in Placentia Bay in Newfoundland and Labrador.
