= Island Cove, Newfoundland and Labrador =

Vacated Settlement in Newfoundland and Labrador

Island Cove
- Vacated settlement
- Interactive map of Island Cove
- Coordinates: 48°0′11″N 53°46′34″W
- Country: Canada
- Province: Newfoundland and Labrador
- Location: Trinity Bay

Island Cove was a small place off Trinity Bay, Newfoundland and Labrador, Canada that has now been resettled. The Way Office was established in 1864 and the first Waymaster was John Crane, it was converted into a Post Office status in 1891.

== See also ==
- List of ghost towns in Newfoundland and Labrador
