= Tack's Beach =

Former community in Newfoundland and Labrador, Canada

Coordinates: 47°34′40″N 54°12′44″W

Location of Tack's Beach in Newfoundland

Tack's Beach was a small community located on King Island in Placentia Bay. The population was 252 in 1921. The population had declined to 140 by 1966 due to a decline in fish stocks and the community was depopulated in 1967.

== See also ==
- List of communities in Newfoundland and Labrador
- List of ghost towns in Newfoundland and Labrador
