= Little Placentia Sound, Newfoundland and Labrador =

Little Placentia Sound The Sound
- Abandoned Town
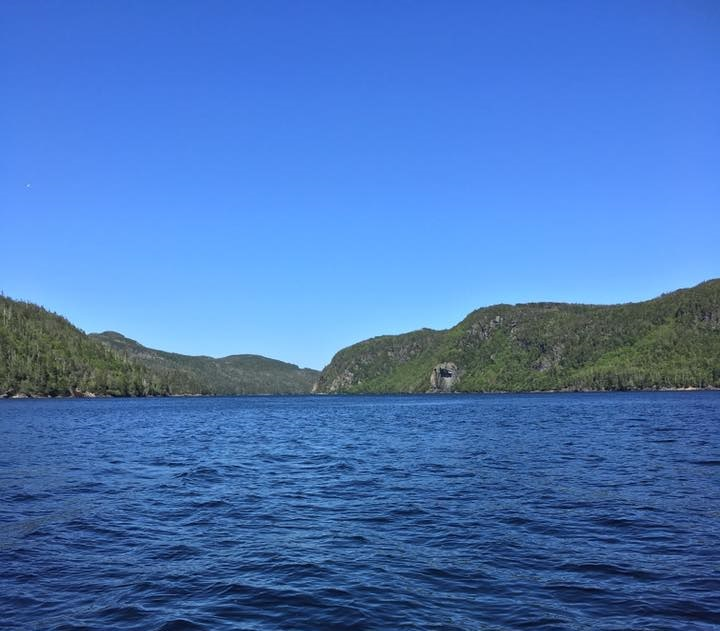
- Looking east down Little Placentia Sound, present day

- Location of Little Placentia Sound in Newfoundland
- Coordinates: 47°18′17.9″N 53°53′35.0″W
- Country: Canada
- Province: Newfoundland and Labrador
- Census division: Division 1
- Census subdivision: Subdivision B

Population (1901)
  - Total: 47
- Time zone: UTC-3:30 (Newfoundland Time)
  - Summer (DST): UTC-2:30 (Newfoundland Daylight)
- Area code: 709
- Bay: Placentia Bay

Little Placentia Sound is an abandoned town in Newfoundland and Labrador that had a peak population of 47 in 1901. It is named after the body of water (sound) that encompasses the former community located within Placentia Bay on the Avalon Peninsula in the Canadian province of Newfoundland and Labrador. There was once a lead mine called Silver Cliff Mine located within the town.

During World War II the United States Navy built a naval base nearby at Argentia.

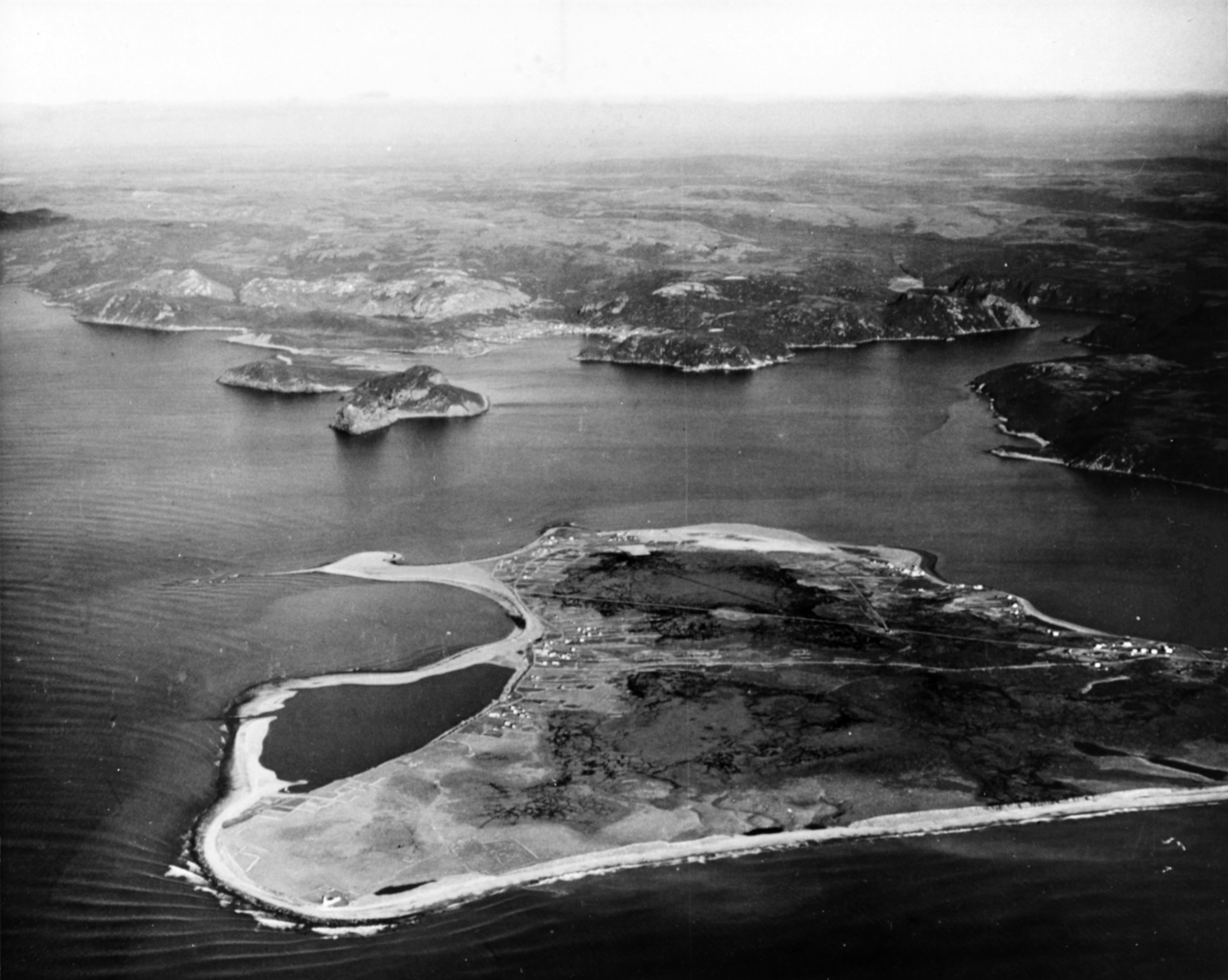
Aerial photo from 1940, showing the town of Argentia in the foreground, the community of Fox Harbour in the upper middle, and Little Placentia Sound on the upper far right.

== Demographics ==
In 1894/1897, McAlpine's released a business directory that lists the head of each household with their occupation in the town of Little Placentia Sound at that time. It is adapted below:

1894/1897 Business Directory
Bruce, David	Fisherman
Cunningham, John	Fisherman
Cunningham, Edward	Fisherman
Darmody, James	Fisherman
Meade, Jeremiah SR.	Farmer
Meade, Jeremiah JR.	Farmer
Sampson, Martin	Fisherman

In 1901, the town of Little Placentia Sound had 47 residents, all of the Roman Catholic faith.

== See also ==
- Fox Harbour, Newfoundland and Labrador
- Argentia
- Naval Station Argentia
