= Barren Island, Newfoundland and Labrador =

Coordinates: 47.61687°N 54.16203°W

Barren Island is an island in the Placentia district of Canada.

The name has been shown as Baron's and also Baron Island in 1889 and Bar Haven in 1912.

== See also ==
- List of ghost towns in Newfoundland and Labrador
