= Apsey Cove =

Coordinates: 49°1′54″N 58°6′16″W

Apsey Cove Apsey Cove Point
- Ghost town
- Interactive map of Apsey Cove
- Country: Canada
- Province: Newfoundland and Labrador

Population (1911)
  - Total: 30
- Time zone: UTC-3:30 (Newfoundland Time)
  - Summer (DST): UTC-2:30 (Newfoundland Daylight)
- Area code: 709

Apsey Cove was formerly named Apsey Cove Point. It was a settlement in the "Trinity District". It was a fishing and farming settlement in 1911 with a population of 30.

== See also ==
- List of ghost towns in Newfoundland and Labrador
