= Bay de L'Eau =

Human settlement in Newfoundland and Labrador, Canada

Coordinates: 47°38′N 54°55′W

Location of Bay de L'Eau in Newfoundland and Labrador

Bay de L'Eau is an abandoned community in Fortune Bay, Newfoundland and Labrador. It is located 2 kilometers to the west of English Harbour East and 22 kilometers to the east of Rencontre East.

== See also ==
- List of ghost towns in Newfoundland and Labrador
