= Puddingbag Cove =

Ghost town in Newfoundland and Labrador

Poudingbag Cove is a ghost town in Newfoundland and Labrador. It is located in Bonavista Bay, Division No. 7. It lies just south of Badger's Quay, New-Wes-Valley

The adjacent community of Safe Harbour was originally grouped together with Poudingbag Cove, however, they are distinct from one another.

A combined census of both Safe Harbour and Poudingbag Cove put the population at 155 in 1951, however, the peak of the population was 326 in 1921.

== See also ==
- List of ghost towns in Newfoundland and Labrador
