= Western Cove, Newfoundland and Labrador =

Coordinates: 47°41′31″N 54°14′42″W

Location of Western Cove in Newfoundland

Western Cove is located on Bar Haven Island in Placentia Bay. It is formed between Newfoundland, Labrador, and Bar Haven.

== See also ==
- List of communities in Newfoundland and Labrador
- List of ghost towns in Newfoundland and Labrador
