= American Point =

Ghost town in Newfoundland and Labrador

American Point is a ghost town in Newfoundland and Labrador. It is located in Division No. 8, Subdivision B on the Island of Ponds in Porcupine Bay, Labrador.

The closest human settlement to American Point is the Local Service District, Black Tickle.

== See also ==
- List of ghost towns in Newfoundland and Labrador
