= Baldwin Cove =

Baldwin Cove is a former hamlet in the "St. Barbe District" of the Canadian province of Newfoundland and Labrador.

== See also ==
- List of ghost towns in Newfoundland and Labrador
