= Bayly's Cove =

Former settlement in Newfoundland and Labrador

- Former settlement
- Interactive map of Bayly's Cove
- Coordinates: 48°39′N 53°07′W
- Country: Canada
- Province: Newfoundland and Labrador
- Region: Bonavista Bay

Population (1945)
  - Total: 900

Bayly's Cove was on Bonavista Bay and had a population of 900 in 1945.

== See also ==
- List of ghost towns in Newfoundland and Labrador
