= Bake Apple Bight =

Former hamlet in Newfoundland and Labrador, Canada

Bake Apple Bight is a former hamlet in the Canadian province of Newfoundland and Labrador.

It was located on the Labrador coast, the nearest port of call was Smokey Tickle.

== See also ==
- List of ghost towns in Newfoundland and Labrador
