= Cape la Hune =

Location of Cape la Hune in Newfoundland and Labrador

Cape la Hune was a settlement in Newfoundland and Labrador. The community was part of the provincial governments resettlement program, beginning in the 1950's, that saw the residents of many isolated communities relocated to larger communities to reduce costs from ferry and infrastructure services. The former site of Cape la Hune is completely abandoned, with few remnants of the previous buildings remaining.

The community was settled in the early 19th century by West Country English families.

== See also ==
- List of ghost towns in Newfoundland and Labrador
