= Aaron Island =

- Former community
- Location of Aaron Island in Newfoundland
- Coordinates: 47°36′N 57°39′W
- Country: Canada
- Province: Newfoundland and Labrador
- Time zone: UTC-3:30 (Newfoundland Time)
  - Summer (DST): UTC-2:30 (Newfoundland Daylight)
- Area code: 709

Aaron Island is an island and former unincorporated community in the Canadian province of Newfoundland and Labrador.

== See also ==
- List of ghost towns in Newfoundland and Labrador
