= Current Island, Newfoundland =

Town in Newfoundland and Labrador, Canada

Coordinates: 51°10′39″N 56°49′15″W

Location of Current Island in Newfoundland

Historical populations
Year	Pop.
1873	30
1941	53
1954	84

Current Island (also known as Currant Island) was a small town located in Newfoundland and Labrador, offshore from the west coast of the Great Northern Peninsula. It was likely first established as a seasonal fishing settlement in the early 1800s. The first recorded permanent settlement was in 1869, when there were two families totalling 30 people living there. Industries on the island included cod, salmon, herring, and seal fisheries, as well as logging and a sawmill. In 1959, an outbreak of tuberculosis on the island affected most of the residents. The outbreak, along with poor government services and the depletion of fuel supplies, forced the residents to abandon the town in 1965. Since its abandonment in 1965, the town has been known as Former Island.

== See also ==
- List of communities in Newfoundland and Labrador
- List of ghost towns in Newfoundland and Labrador
