= St. Jones Without, Newfoundland and Labrador =

Abandoned community in Newfoundland and Labrador, Canada

Coordinates: 47.919°N 53.691°W

Location of St. Jones Without in Newfoundland

Historical populations
Year	Pop.
1884	33
1901	97*
1935	140
1951	81
*Population from 1901 includes Garretts Cove

St. Jones Without was a community located on the western side of Trinity Bay in Newfoundland and Labrador. It was first settled around 1870. By 1891 the community had two schools and two churches (Methodist and Church of England). The population peaked at 140 in 1935. During World War II many of the residents relocated to find work and the community was abandoned in the early 1950s.

== See also ==
- List of communities in Newfoundland and Labrador
- List of ghost towns in Newfoundland and Labrador
