= Baker's Head =

Baker's Head is a former hamlet in the Placentia District of the Canadian province of Newfoundland and Labrador.

== See also ==
- List of ghost towns in Newfoundland and Labrador
