= Jersey Harbour, Newfoundland and Labrador =

Vacated settlement

Coordinates: 47°29′9″N 55°45′40″W

Jersey Harbour Jerseyman's Harbour
- Former settlement
- Interactive map of Jersey Harbour
- Country: Canada
- Province: Newfoundland and Labrador
- Bay: Fortune Bay
- Time zone: NST (UTC+03:30)
  - Summer (DST): NDT (UTC−02:30)
- Area code(s): 709, 879

Jersey Harbour, also known as Jerseyman's Harbour, is a former small settlement in Fortune Bay on the south coast of Newfoundland, Canada.

The Post Office was established in 1895 and the first Postmistress was Mary White. Jersey Harbour is now considered a ghost town.

The name "Jerseyman's Harbour" has been used interchangeably with Jersey Harbour in various written records. It is theorized that this name referred to fishing merchants from Jersey (one of the Channel Islands between Great Britain and France) who originally settled or worked in Newfoundland.

== See also ==
- List of ghost towns in Newfoundland and Labrador
