= Apsey Point =

Coordinates: 49°2′1″N 58°6′33″W

- Ghost town
- Interactive map of Apsey Point
- Country: Canada
- Province: Newfoundland and Labrador

Population (1911)
  - Total: 180
- Time zone: UTC-3:30 (Newfoundland Time)
  - Summer (DST): UTC-2:30 (Newfoundland Daylight)
- Area code: 709

Apsey Point was a farming and fishing settlement in the Trinity District. Banking was done at Harbor Grace. In 1911 the population was 180.

== See also ==
- List of ghost towns in Newfoundland and Labrador
