= Cape Island, Newfoundland and Labrador =

Island and community in Newfoundland and Labrador, Canada

Coordinates: 49°15′18.41″N 53°27′44.21″W

Cape Island is the name of both an island and a former community in the Canadian province of Newfoundland and Labrador.

Cape Island is situated off the eastern tip of Cape Freels in Bonavista Bay, along the northeast coast of the island of Newfoundland. A small fishing community was settled in the late 18th century by fishermen and trappers from nearby settlements such as Greenspond and Bonavista.

The 1836 Census of Newfoundland show that there were 100 people living at Cape Island during this time. The inhabitants made their living through small-boat inshore cod fishery, catching capelin, and participating in the seal hunt. However, with an already fluctuating population, a decline in the inshore fishery and changes brought on by salt and fresh-frozen processing resulted in the resettlement of the community. Between 1948 and 1950 the community of Cape Island was abandoned.

== Church history ==
According to the 1836 Census, 98 of the 100 inhabitants at Cape Island belonged to the Church of England and two were Roman Catholic. When the population was 69 in 1857, 65 of them were of the Church of England. Although Cape Island never had a Church of England church, ministers would visit the community on occasion for services, marriages, baptisms, and burials. For example, Rev. Nathanial Coster, the first resident Church of England minister in Greenspond, visited Cape Island in June 1831 and 1855. The Rev. Julian Moreton mentions Cape Island and the visits he made there in his journal from 1855 to 1859. The Rev. Goodacre Cragg also visited Cape Island, for example in 1865, he conducted 12 services at Cape Island. By the 1860s Methodism had come to Cape Island; in 1869, 28 of the 82 people in the community were Methodist. By 1874, there were 31 people belonging to the Church of England, while 63 were Methodist. The first church on Cape Island was a Methodist church built in the 1870s.

== Census information ==
	1836	1845	1857	1874
Population	100	79	69	94
Houses	11	9	9	12
Church of England	98	79	69	31
Methodist	0	0	0	63
Total fishing boats	9	9	10	5
Fishing rooms	n/a	n/a	5	9
Seal nets	n/a	29	27	35
Seals caught	n/a	n/a	46	290
Potatoes produced	276.5 (bushels)	39 (barrels)	140 (barrels)	115 (barrels)
Cod fish cured	n/a	n/a	1150 qtls	1440 qtls

== Other facts ==
- Cape Island had 29 seal nets in 1845 and 27 from 1857 to 1869.
- Cape Island had 2 large boats for sealing in 1836, and 4 in the years 1845 and 1869.
- In the Greenland Disaster of 1898, Cape Island lost three men: Alexander Andrews, Edwin Hunt, and John Vincent.
- Thomas Mellindy is recorded in the Hutchinson's Newfoundland Directory 1864-1865, as a planter on Cape Island.

== See also ==
- List of ghost towns in Newfoundland and Labrador
