= Coppett, Newfoundland and Labrador =

Coordinates: 47°36′25″N 57°14′18″W

Location of Coppett in Newfoundland

Historical populations
Year	Pop.
1857	18
1871	15
1901	30
1941	67
1945	56

Coppett was a small town located on the south coast of Newfoundland and Labrador, and north-east of Ramea. The first record of the community was in the 1857 census. Coppett grew steadily until the 1930s and at its peak had a school and two lobster factories. Several factors including the collapse of the inshore cod fishery, lack of government services and isolation caused the community to be abandoned between 1945 and 1951 without government assistance. The majority of the inhabitants resettled to Ramea or Burgeo. Several properties on the island were maintained until the 1980s for use as summer homes.

== See also ==
- Shag Islands
- List of communities in Newfoundland and Labrador
- List of ghost towns in Newfoundland and Labrador
