= Bat's Path End =

Bat's Path End was a hamlet near Trinity, Newfoundland and Labrador, Canada. The nearest post office was in Shoal Harbour.

== See also ==
- List of ghost towns in Newfoundland and Labrador
