= Back Cove, Labrador, Newfoundland and Labrador =

Coordinates: 52.7974338°N 55.832067°W

Back Cove is a cove and former settlement on the coast of Labrador, Canada. The nearest port of call was Dead Island, Labrador. Both settlements were located on West Island in St. Michaels Bay.

== See also ==
- List of ghost towns in Newfoundland and Labrador
