= Paddock's Bight =

Ghost town in Newfoundland and Labrador

Paddock's Bight is a ghost town in Newfoundland and Labrador.

In the 1921 census, Paddock's Bight had a population of 37 in 6 households.

Sidney Prince was the Committee Chairman for Paddock's Bight in the district of Green Bay for the Local Roads Committees created by the Department of Public Works.

Paddock's Bight would be abandoned around the late 1950s as a result of the Resettlement Program.

== See also ==
- List of ghost towns in Newfoundland and Labrador
