= Darby's Harbour =

Canadian locality and former settlement

Coordinates: 47°28′10″N 54°32′29″W

Darby's Harbour is a locality and former settlement located southwest of Swift Current in Paradise Sound, Placentia Bay, Newfoundland, Canada. It had a post office in 1940. In 1935, its population was 21, but by 1990, it was uninhabited.

== See also ==
- List of communities in Newfoundland and Labrador
