= Chaleur Bay (Newfoundland and Labrador) =

Natural bay in Newfoundland and Labrador, Canada

Coordinates: 47.599°N 56.748°W

Chaleur Bay is a natural bay on the island of Newfoundland in the province of Newfoundland and Labrador, Canada. Its features include cliffs, ravines and waterfalls.

== See also ==
- List of communities in Newfoundland and Labrador
- List of ghost towns in Newfoundland and Labrador
