= Bragg's Island, Newfoundland and Labrador =

Coordinates: 48.9357°N 53.6696°W

Location of Bragg's Island in Newfoundland

Bragg's Island was a settlement in Newfoundland and Labrador.

The community of Bragg's Island (pop. 1951, 83) was on the north side of Bonavista Bay southeast of Trinity. The community had eighteen people in 1857 and was resettled between 1952 and 1955. The main receiving areas were Glovertown, Dark Cove and Hare Bay.

Bragg's Island depended predominantly on the fishery, with a small amount of agriculture supplementing the people's needs. The inshore fishery was particularly important but the community was also dependent on the Labrador fishery. The island was nestled close to two other island communities; Deer Island and Green's Island.

In 1921 ten vessels from the three communities were involved in the Labrador fishery and in 1920 sixty-eight men obtained employment there.

The first church to serve the communities was built in 1909. The people were almost exclusively Methodist and then United Church. https://www.mun.ca/mha/resettlement/braggs_island_1.php

== See also ==
- List of communities in Newfoundland and Labrador
- List of ghost towns in Newfoundland and Labrador
