= Beaverton, Newfoundland and Labrador =

Coordinates: 49°31′N 54°35′W

Beaverton was a locality near Twillingate and Beaver Cove. It had one store in 1911.

Beaverton is located on the east coast of Newfoundland (on Notre Dame Bay, east of the Baie Verte Peninsula).

== See also ==
- List of ghost towns in Newfoundland and Labrador
