= Anderson's Cove =

Coordinates: 47.607°N 55.110°W

Anderson's Cove is a former community on the south coast of the province of Newfoundland and Labrador.

Location of Andersons Cove in Newfoundland

== See also ==
- List of ghost towns in Newfoundland and Labrador
