= Quarry, Newfoundland and Labrador =

Abandoned railway community in Newfoundland, Canada

Coordinates: 49°03′06″N 56°35′14″W

Quarry is an abandoned railway community that was located in the Gaff Topsails area of the province of Newfoundland, Canada. The community lies just north of Buchans and takes its name from the quarry established in the 1890s when the Newfoundland Railway was being built.

Granite from this quarry was used throughout the island by the Reid Newfoundland Company and it also provided cobblestones for Water Street in St. John's. The nearest community was Millertown Junction, 25 kilometres to the east. It became an important station as the area just west of Quarry was renowned for its frequently closing of the railway due to heavy snow drifts, an area known as the Gaff Topsails. The station was reclassified as unstaffed by Canadian National in 1954.

== See also ==
- List of communities in Newfoundland and Labrador
- Newfoundland Railway
