= Barrett's Siding =

Ghost town in Newfoundland and Labrador

Barrett's Siding is a ghost town in Newfoundland and Labrador. It is located in Division No. 7, Subdivision E.

The community came about as a side track railcar storage depot on the Bonavista branch railway. It first appeared on 1956 census with a population of 16; this was the height of the population. In 1961 there were eight people, in 1966 this would drop to four.

== See also ==
- List of ghost towns in Newfoundland and Labrador
