= Corbin, Fortune Bay, Newfoundland and Labrador =

Former settlement in Newfoundland and Labrador, Canada

Coordinates: 47.583°N 55.418°W

Location of Corbin in Newfoundland and Labrador

Corbin is a former settlement in the Canadian province of Newfoundland and Labrador.
