= Bait Cove =

Bait Cove was a hamlet in the Twillingate District, Newfoundland and Labrador. It had no remaining population by 1911.

== See also ==
- List of ghost towns in Newfoundland and Labrador
