= Bakers Brook =

Coordinates: 49°39′13″N 57°57′18″W

Bakers Brook is a former Canadian fishing settlement on Bonne Bay, on the island of Newfoundland, in the Canadian province of Newfoundland and Labrador.

It is located north of Woody Point. It had a population of 6 in 1911. It is located on a stretch of coastline that is bordered by a stony beach and a long shoal bank. In 1901 there was one lobster factory with a total of four seasonal employees. Cod was also caught. By 1911 there were two families that operated two lobster factories.

When the census was completed in 1921 the population of Baker's Brook had risen to sixteen people. In 1929 there were only two houses, in 1939 the first one-room school was founded-with Joe Ollerhead as the teacher. The peak population of 45 residents was reached in 1956, with inhabitants relying on fishing, trapping and forestry.

In 1973 the Federal-Provincial Agreement provided for the establishment of Gros Morne National Park which included the community of Baker's Brook. As it was within the boundaries of the park it was designated a "park community". As a result of this policy the population declined to 30 in 1976 and by 1980 there were no remaining residents. By this time, it was reported that Baker's Brook was merely used for summer fishing. In 1981 Baker's Brook was turned into a picnic area in Gros Morne National Park.

== See also ==
- List of ghost towns in Newfoundland and Labrador
