= Baie de Loutre =

Baie de Loutre (Otter Bay) is a former hamlet in the Canadian province of Newfoundland and Labrador.

It is located on Outer Bay in what was known as the "Burgeo and LaPoile District" with the closest town being Channel-Port aux Basques.

== See also ==
- List of ghost towns in Newfoundland and Labrador
