= Clattice Harbour, Newfoundland and Labrador =

Abandoned community in Canada

Coordinates: 47.483°N 54.465°W

Location of Clattice Harbour in Newfoundland and Labrador

Clattice Harbour, also sometimes known as Clattis Harbour, is an abandoned community located in the province of Newfoundland and Labrador. The earliest known mention of the placename comes from an official 1772 Placentia Bay survey map, which suggests that the location had been known and accessed for the local fishery since the mid-18th century. A fisherman named Culliton and a Connors family permanently settled the natural harbour in the early 1800s to catch herring and access local timber stocks. The population grew to include seven households and 41 people by 1836, with records of Connors and Houlihan families.

By 1871, the population grew to 71 due to the settlement of various Brewer, Carroll, Follett, Hepditch, and Palfrey families. The Parsons and Brewers are noted as local outport merchant families by the early 20th century. The community would develop local fish processing capabilities, with herring and squid facilities established in the 1930's and 1950's, respectively. The community was abandoned by its residents in 1966 as part of the provincial resettlement program, led by the government of Joey Smallwood.
