= Facheux Bay =

Bay in Canada

Coordinates: 47°38′06″N 56°19′46″W

Facheux Bay (pronounced ['fʊʃi:]) was the location of a small fishing settlement of the same name. In 1901 it had a population of 47. The community was also called Fachier, Facheaux, and Fouche. Facheux Bay is a deep fjord that separates Eastern Head and Western Head of Hermitage Bay, Newfoundland, Canada. Facheux bay is 2.25 miles (3.62 km) west of Mosquito Cove. The entrance is between two steep falls in high hills. The bay runs in 6.5 miles (10.5 km), with an average width of 0.75 miles (1.21 km), and has deep water throughout. On the west side are three coves with anchorage in 20 to 10 fathoms.

== See also ==
- List of communities in Newfoundland and Labrador
