= Sagona =

Village in Newfoundland and Labrador, Canada

Coordinates: 47°22′N 55°47′W

Sagona was a village located on Sagona Island in Fortune Bay in the Gulf of St. Lawrence on the south coast of Newfoundland, Canada. It had a population of 223 in 1940 and 120 in 1956, and has been resettled in the late 1960s to towns on the south coast of Newfoundland. Wind speeds of 163kmh recently have made it one of the windiest. No ferries travel to the island as it is now uninhabited.

== See also ==
- List of ghost towns in Newfoundland and Labrador
