= American Cove =

- Ghost town
- Country: Canada
- Province: Newfoundland and Labrador
- Settled: 1911
- Time zone: UTC-4 (Atlantic Time)
  - Summer (DST): UTC-3 (Atlantic Daylight Time)
- Area code: 709

American Cove was a hamlet on the Labrador coast as early as 1911. The nearest port of call was Grady, Newfoundland and Labrador. It is on Huntingdon island.

== See also ==
- List of ghost towns in Newfoundland and Labrador
