= Goose Arm =

Settlement

Coordinates: 49°08′28″N 57°54′57″W

Location of Goose Arm in Newfoundland

Goose Arm was a settlement located north of Corner Brook. The community was settled in the late 19th century. A lumber mill and the fishery were the main employers in the community. At its peak in 1921 the population of Goose Arm was 76. The population declined in the 1940s and 1950s due to the closure of the lumber mill and the decline in the herring fishery. The last inhabitants relocated to nearby Cox's Cove in the early 1960s.

== See also ==
- List of ghost towns in Newfoundland and Labrador
