= Black Island, Friday Bay, Newfoundland and Labrador =

Coordinates: 49.536°N 54.972°W

Location of Black Island in Newfoundland and Labrador

Black Island is an island and former settlement in the Canadian province of Newfoundland and Labrador.

== See also ==
- List of ghost towns in Newfoundland and Labrador
