= Bane Harbor =

Bane Harbor is a former settlement in the Placentia District of the Canadian province of Newfoundland and Labrador.

== See also ==
- List of ghost towns in Newfoundland and Labrador
