= Cape La Hune =

Location of Cape La Hune in Newfoundland

The headland of Cape La Hune is a remote point of land on the south coast of the island of Newfoundland in the Canadian province of Newfoundland and Labrador. The Cape is the location of the provincial electoral district of Fortune Bay-Cape La Hune.

Not far from the cape itself was the fishing community of Cape la Hune which was settled in the early 19th century by West Country English families.

== See also ==
- List of unincorporated communities in Newfoundland and Labrador
- List of ghost towns in Newfoundland and Labrador
