= Ariege Bay =

Coordinates: 51.167°N 56.000°W

Ariege Bay is a former hamlet in the "St. Barbe District" of the province of Newfoundland and Labrador. It is located near Main Brook.

== See also ==
- List of ghost towns in Newfoundland and Labrador
