= L'Anse-au-Diable =

Settlement in Newfoundland and Labrador

Coordinates: 51°34′N 56°45′W

L'Anse-au-Diable was a small settlement located south west of Red Bay, Newfoundland and Labrador.

== See also ==
- List of ghost towns in Newfoundland and Labrador
