= George's Cove =

Coordinates: 52°41′N 55°52′W

George's Cove, Labrador, is a ghost town located on the north shore of Granby Island. The first postmaster was Berton Henry Penney. The 1945 census reported 23 residents in George's Cove.

== See also ==
- List of ghost towns in Newfoundland and Labrador
