= Kingwell, Newfoundland and Labrador =

Community in Placentia Bay

Coordinates: 47°32′58″N 54°6′20″W

Kingwell
- Seasonal Settlement
- Interactive map of Kingwell
- Country: Canada
- Province: Newfoundland and Labrador
- Region: Placentia Bay
- Island: Long Island
- Time zone: UTC−3:30 (Newfoundland Time Zone)
  - Summer (DST): UTC−2:30 (Newfoundland Daylight Time)
- CGNBC Key: AALPT

Formerly called Mussel Harbor Arm, Kingwell is a village located on Long Island in Placentia Bay. It had a population of 243 in 1940 and 198 in 1956. The community was resettled in the 1960s but some former residents and their descendants have summer homes there and return every year for extended periods.

== See also ==
- List of communities in Newfoundland and Labrador
