= Barge Bay, Newfoundland and Labrador =

Coordinates: 51°48′26″N 56°12′39″W

Barge Bay is a former settlement in the Canadian province of Newfoundland and Labrador. The community was resettled.

It is located on a bay with the same name on the southeast coast of Labrador and lies 10 miles northeast of Red Bay.

== See also ==
- List of ghost towns in Newfoundland and Labrador
