= Dragon, Newfoundland and Labrador =

Ghost town and natural bay in Newfoundland and Labrador

Dragon, Dragon Harbour, or Dragon Bay is a ghost town and natural bay in Division No. 3.

It is believed that the unusual name was given to the area by French fishermen to describe the unforgiving nature of this part of the South Coast.

== See also ==
- List of ghost towns in Newfoundland and Labrador
