= Abbott Cove =

Bay in Newfoundland and Labrador, Canada

Coordinates: 49.53383°N 55.29990°W

Location of Abbott Cove in Newfoundland

Abbott Cove (sometimes written Abbot Cove) is a bay and site of a former community in the province of Newfoundland and Labrador, Canada.

The 1913 McAlpine Gazetteer lists the community in "Twillingate District" and states that the nearest post town is Fortune Harbour.

An 1884 pilot guide discusses an Abbot Cove in Notre Dame Bay:

Eastern point, the extreme of a narrow promontory rising to a wooded cone, 390 feet high. Foul ground extends a short distance from the head, and sunken rocks encumber Abbot cove, the bight close east of Eastern point. A conspicuous hill, 435 feet high, falls perpendicularly to the head, where a small village is situated.

== See also ==
- List of ghost towns in Newfoundland and Labrador
