= Assizes Harbour =

Hamlet in Canada

Coordinates: 52.2634°N 55.6925°W

Assizes Harbour is a Canadian hamlet in the province of Newfoundland and Labrador.

Located on the Strait of Belle Isle along the Labrador coast, the nearest community is Battle Harbour.

== See also ==
- List of communities in Newfoundland and Labrador
