= Deer Harbour =

Village near Clarenville

Coordinates: 48.133°N 53.583°W

Deer Harbour was a village located east of Clarenville. The post office was established in 1894. The first Postmistress was Jemima King. The post office closed on October 13, 1967 due to de-population.

== See also ==
- List of communities in Newfoundland and Labrador
