= Coney Arm =

Abandoned community in Newfoundland and Labrador, Canada

Coordinates: 49.963°N 56.792°W

Location of Coney Arm in Newfoundland and Labrador

Coney Arm is an abandoned community in Newfoundland and Labrador.
