= Pumbley Cove =

Ghost town in Newfoundland and Labrador

Coordinates: 49°44′14″N 56°40′26″W

- Settlement
- Interactive map of Pumbley Cove
- Country: Canada
- Province: Newfoundland and Labrador
- Time zone: UTC−3:30 (Newfoundland Time)
  - Summer (DST): UTC−2:30 (Newfoundland Daylight Time)
- Area code: 709

Pumbley Cove is a settlement located in Newfoundland and Labrador.
