= Miller's Passage, Newfoundland and Labrador =

Settlement in Newfoundland & Labrador

Coordinates: 47.516°N 55.566°W

Location of Miller's Passage in Newfoundland and Labrador

Miller's Passage is a settlement in the Canadian province of Newfoundland and Labrador.
