= Fry's Cove =

Settlement in Newfoundland and Labrador

- Settlement
- Interactive map of Fry's Cove
- Country: Canada
- Province: Newfoundland and Labrador
- Region: Bonavista Peninsula
- Census division: Division No. 7
- Time zone: UTC−3:30 (NST)
  - Summer (DST): UTC−2:30 (NDT)
- Area code: 709

Fry's Cove is a settlement in Newfoundland and Labrador.
