= Indian Burying Place, Newfoundland and Labrador =

Human settlement in Newfoundland and Labrador, Canada

Coordinates: 49.831°N 55.733°W

Location of Indian Burying Place in Newfoundland and Labrador

Indian Burying Place is a settlement in Newfoundland and Labrador.
