= Barachois, Newfoundland and Labrador =

Coordinates: 46°51′42″N 53°35′01″W

Barachois was a small hamlet on the Strait of Belle Isle, on the Labrador coast.

== See also ==
- List of ghost towns in Newfoundland and Labrador
