= The Droke =

Coordinates: 47°03′46″N 55°10′23″W

The Droke is a settlement located within the town of Burin, south of Marystown, Newfoundland and Labrador.

== See also ==
- List of communities in Newfoundland and Labrador
