= Voy's Beach =

Coordinates: 49°02′11″N 58°09′00″W

Voy's Beach is a settlement in Newfoundland and Labrador. Located northwest of Corner Brook, it is part of the Town of Humber Arm South.

== See also ==
- List of communities in Newfoundland and Labrador
