= Abbate Point =

Coordinates: 59.220°N 63.385°W

Location of Abbate Point in Newfoundland and Labrador

Abbate Point is a former settlement in Newfoundland and Labrador.
