= Baker's Cove =

Baker's Cove, sometimes written Bakers Cove, is the name of three coves in the Canadian province of Newfoundland and Labrador as well as of a former hamlet in the Burgeo District of Newfoundland and Labrador.

== See also ==
- List of ghost towns in Newfoundland and Labrador
