= Anthony Island, Newfoundland and Labrador =

Anthony Island
- Ghost town
- Location of Anthony Island in Newfoundland
- Coordinates: 48°12′32″N 53°28′28″W
- Country: Canada
- Province: Newfoundland and Labrador
- Time zone: UTC-3:30 (Newfoundland Time)
  - Summer (DST): UTC-2:30 (Newfoundland Daylight)
- Area code: 709

Anthony Island is a Canadian island and former fishing settlement in Trinity Bay in the province of Newfoundland and Labrador.

== See also ==
- List of ghost towns in Newfoundland and Labrador
