= Brake's Cove, Newfoundland and Labrador =

Coordinates: 49.128°N 58.080°W

Location of Brake's Cove in Newfoundland and Labrador

Brake's Cove is an abandoned community in Newfoundland and Labrador.

In 1966 the inhabitants of the village of Brakes Cove were forcibly resettled and the village ceased to exist. Many of those displaced moved to Cox's Cove, two kilometers away, while others are distributed across North America. Nearly half a century later the resettlement program in general and the Brakes Cove displacement in particular constitute a major component of the heritage of Cox's Cove. https://web.archive.org/web/20160304060438/http://yaffle.ca/a/viewOpportunity/id/141/rc/1/

Newfoundland 1921 Census Brakes Cove, Bay St. George District There were 41 individuals in 8 Households http://ngb.chebucto.org/C1921/21-brakes-cv-stg.shtml
