= Lobster Harbour, Newfoundland and Labrador =

Lobster Harbour may refer to either a settlement located in Notre Dame Bay or to one in White Bay, Newfoundland and Labrador.

== Lobster Harbour, Notre Dame Bay ==
Lobster Harbour was a settlement located on New World Island, Notre Dame Bay near 49°36′N 54°41′W . It is located within the Twillingate district but does not appear in the 1921 Newfoundland Census. It appears in the 1935 Newfoundland Census, with a population of 10 residents, growing to 12 by 1945.

== Lobster Harbour, White Bay ==
Lobster Harbour was a settlement located on the west side of the Baie Verte Peninsula near 49°59′10.313″N 56°21′34.3″W. The settlement was first populated in the early 1800s, certainly by 1856 , by those with rights to fish in French territorial waters. This treaty area ceased to exist by 1904, eliminating the traffic of French fishers and the requirement to mind their equipment through the winter months that many relied on for employment. .

The settlement appears in the 1921 Newfoundland Census in the St. Barbe district with a population of 2 people. It is located within the White Bay district in the 1935 Newfoundland Census with a population of 10 residents. It does not appear in the 1945 Newfoundland Census, supporting anecdotal information that the community was abandoned by this time.

== See also ==
- List of communities in Newfoundland and Labrador
