= Aviron Bay =

Natural bay in Newfoundland and Labrador, Canada

Coordinates: 47.566°N 56.815°W

Aviron Bay (or Oar Bay) is natural bay on the island of Newfoundland in the province of Newfoundland and Labrador, Canada. The Friar, a castellated rock, is located between Aviron Bay and Cul-de-sac bay.
