= Great Brule, Newfoundland and Labrador =

Great Brule Bruley, Brewley, Brule
- Abandoned community
- Location of Great Brule in Newfoundland
- Coordinates: 47°39′58″N 54°07′30″W
- Country: Canada
- Province: Newfoundland and Labrador

Great Brule, also called Bruley or Brewley, is an uninhabited former fishing settlement located at the northern tip of Merasheen Island in Placentia Bay, Newfoundland and Labrador, Canada.

Great Brule was once a small, close-knit outport community typical of nineteenth to early twentieth-century Newfoundland. Its residents lived close to the sea and relied almost entirely on inshore fishing, using small wooden boats to fish for cod from the surrounding waters of Placentia Bay. The settlement reached its peak population of 108 in 1951, but within five years it was abandoned under the province's early resettlement programs, which encouraged families to move to larger communities with what were suggested as being better conditions. The harbour and surrounding slopes where homes once stood are now overgrown, leaving only traces of foundations visible.

== History ==
Permanent settlement at Great Brule began in 1813, when families of Irish and English origin established homes on the northern shore of Merasheen Island. This influx was part of the broader movement of settlers who migrated to Placentia Bay during Newfoundland's early nineteenth-century fishery expansion. Like neighbouring communities on Merasheen Island, Great Brule developed around the inshore cod fishery, with small-scale herring and lobster fisheries supplementing household incomes. There were seasonal patterns of activity; in warmer weather, families dried and salted cod near the shoreline, while during the winter months they repaired boats, split firewood, and maintained small gardens to provide food for the coming year.

Throughout the late nineteenth and early twentieth centuries, Great Brule remained a modest but stable settlement. Census data from 1869 to 1951 record a population that varied between 70 and just over one hundred residents. Extended families often lived side by side, and the same surnames recurred over generations. Church and school life formed the heart of community activity, though educational opportunities were limited to what could be offered locally.

Isolation shaped both the character and the challenges of life in Great Brule. The community had no road access and relied on small boats for transport and communication. Supplies came from merchants on the mainland, and visits from clergy or government officials were infrequent. Even in the face of these difficulties, Great Brule remained a self-sustaining and cohesive community. Its people adapted to changing conditions in the fishery and preserved traditional practices central to Newfoundland's coastal identity.

Following Newfoundland's Confederation with Canada in 1949, the provincial government introduced policies to centralise scattered populations and improve access to education, healthcare, and employment. These programs became collectively known as resettlement or centralization schemes. They caused controversy and deep division, as families were often split; some wished to remain, while others accepted government assistance to move.

Between 1951 and 1956, the population declined markedly under this early centralization program, which was administered by the Department of Welfare. Residents were offered financial support, between $150 and $600 each, to move their homes and possessions to larger centres such as Placentia and Argentia. Entire houses were sometimes floated across Placentia Bay on rafts or dismantled to be used as timber.

By 1956, the last families had left Great Brule. The harbour was abandoned, marking the end of more than a century of habitation. Since then, former residents and their descendants have returned to Merasheen Island for reunions commemorating the lost outports of Placentia Bay and the shared history of communities such as Great Brule.

== Geography ==
Great Brule occupied the northern end of Merasheen Island, one of the largest islands in Placentia Bay. The island measures approximately 35 kilometres in length and up to nine kilometres in width, with a coastline made up of inlets and sheltered harbours that supported small-boat fisheries. The surrounding inlet, Great Brule Harbour, appears in the Canadian Geographical Names Database maintained by Natural Resources Canada.

== Legacy ==
Great Brule stands out as an example of the experience typical of coastal communities affected by Newfoundland's mid-twentieth-century resettlement programs. Between the 1950s and 1970s, more than 7,500 people from over 100 outports moved to towns identified for resettlement throughout Newfoundland and Labrador. In this way, the story of Great Brule has become part of a broader narrative, preserved through academic research, archival photographs, and community reunions held on Merasheen Island since the 1980s.

== Historical population ==
Year	Population	Source
1869	67	Smallwood 1967
1891	34	Smallwood 1967
1901	58	Smallwood 1967
1921	89	Smallwood 1967
1945	93	Smallwood 1967
1951	108	Smallwood 1967
