= Woodford Cove =

Ghost town in Newfoundland and Labrador

Woodford Cove is a ghost town in Notre Dame Bay, Newfoundland and Labrador.

Woodford Cove was settled some time around the 1880s by three families, the Buddens, the Milleys, and the Snows.

The first recorded population was 50 in 1891. In 1921, the peak population of the community was recorded as being 64. Gradually, the population would begin to decline. In 1935, there were 27 inhabitants, and by 1945, there were 24.
