= Bar Haven, Newfoundland and Labrador =

Ghost town in Newfoundland and Labrador

Coordinates: 47°42′N 54°14′W

Bar Haven, formerly called Barren Island, is a former settlement in the Canadian province of Newfoundland and Labrador. It was located on Bar Haven Island.

The community was depopulated by the government in 1966. In 1956 it had a population of 248.

== See also ==
- List of ghost towns in Newfoundland and Labrador
