= Deer Island, South Coast, Newfoundland and Labrador =

Coordinates: 47.6230742°N 57.3663883°W

Location of Deer Island in Newfoundland and Labrador

Deer Island is a vacated settlement in the Canadian province of Newfoundland and Labrador.
