= Rencontre West, Newfoundland and Labrador =

Coordinates: 47°36′54″N 56°40′52″W

Rencontre West was a village located northeast of Ramea, Newfoundland and Labrador. The population was 186 in 1956, but the community has since been resettled.

== See also ==
- List of communities in Newfoundland and Labrador
