= Junction Brook =

Former human settlement and place in Newfoundland and Labrador

Coordinates: 49°12′53″N 57°23′57″W

Junction Brook, sometimes refereed to as the Deer Lake Junction Brook, is a former human settlement in Newfoundland and Labrador. Junction Brook is still actively used today as it is the location of the Deer Lake Regional Airport and it is the location of the Main Dam spillway.

== Main Dam ==
The Junction Brook River is the spillway for the Main Dam of Grand Lake. Main Dam was built in 1925 by the Newfoundland Power and Paper Company to supply electricity to the Corner Brook Pulp and Paper Mill.

== Settlement ==
In the early 1920s Junction Brook began to be settled as a logging town/company town. In 1935, Junction Brook had a recorded population of 36. In 1947, more than 100 people constructed a Salvation Army church, which also acted as a school for the kids of the community. In 1953, the government negotiated resettlement with the residents of Junction Brook to have them relocated. In 1955, the residents relocated to Deer Lake.

== Deer Lake Airport ==
In 1953, the land that was Junction Brook was being surveyed for a possible location for an airport. The government negotiated with the residents of the area to resettle to different communities. In 1955, the residents of Junction Brook resettled and an airstrip was constructed.
