= Fischells, Newfoundland and Labrador =

Coordinates: 48.3168995°N 58.7127649°W

Location of Fischells in Newfoundland and Labrador

Fischells is a community in Newfoundland and Labrador. It was mostly evacuated during the resettlement programmes of over 40 years ago, but a small group remained in the settlement clustered at the southern side of the mouth of Fischells Brook.
