= Indian Tickle =

Coordinates: 53°34′N 56°02′W

Indian Tickle is a locality in the Canadian province of Newfoundland and Labrador. It is located on the Musgrave Land peninsula of Labrador, adjacent to Indian Island. Indian Tickle is a seasonal fishing base that no longer has any permanent inhabitants. It is located on the shore of a small strait that is also called Indian Tickle (nl).

== See also ==
- List of ghost towns in Newfoundland and Labrador
