= St. Kyran's, Newfoundland and Labrador =

Abandoned community in Newfoundland and Labrador, Canada

Coordinates: 47.466°N 54.451°W

Location of St. Kyran's in Newfoundland and Labrador

St. Kyran's was a settlement in Newfoundland and Labrador. Formerly known as the Northeast Arm of Presque, it was likely renamed to St. Kyran's in 1872 by Father Doubtney in honour of prominent Newfoundland priest Kyran Walsh. It contained 12 permanent residents, a Catholic church, a school, and candle manufacturing capabilities by 1857. The Parish of the Assumption was established in 1862 and initially led by Father James Walsh, a Kilkenny native and graduate of St. Kieran's College. By 1871, the population had grown to 30, and had included four separate fishing households and a Catholic priest. St. Kyran's church was a central religious institution in the region, and it was common for the priest to travel to distant communities like Little Merasheen in the late 19th century. The local church was the parish seat for much of Placentia West by the early 20th century.

The community is one of hundreds that were abandoned as part of the provincial government's resettlement programs.

The Stone Church In St. Kyran's, located between Chapel Pond and Calvary Hill. Photo taken by Ernest Walsh.
