= Newport, Newfoundland and Labrador =

Settlement in Newfoundland and Labrador, Canada

Coordinates: 49.043°N 53.643°W

Location of Newport in Newfoundland and Labrador

Newport is a settlement in Newfoundland and Labrador.
