= Brown's Cove =

Settlement in Newfoundland and Labrador

Coordinates: 49.634°N 56.831°W

Location of Brown's Cove in Newfoundland and Labrador

Brown's Cove is a settlement in the Canadian province of Newfoundland and Labrador.
