= St. John Bay =

Bay in Newfoundland and Labrador, Canada

Coordinates: 50°53′18″N 57°06′34″W

Location of St. John Bay in Newfoundland

St. John Bay is a natural bay located on the western side of the Northern Peninsula of the island of Newfoundland, in the Canadian province of Newfoundland and Labrador.

St. John Bay is formed by a shallow indentation and not typical of a land formation as bays are usually recognized. The bay is bounded by Port au Choix on the southern end and New Ferolle on the northern end. A number of islands are located in this bay with the largest of these being St. John Island.
