= Sailor's Island =

Coordinates: 48.694°N 53.675°W

Location of Sailor's Island in Newfoundland and Labrador

Sailor's Island is a former settlement in Newfoundland and Labrador. At its peak in 1921 the population was 93, and is now essentially depopulated, no longer being included in regional census data. Some of the last inhabitants floated their homes down harbour to Dark Cove (part of Eastport), where one or two can still be seen.

According to the Government of Canada's Natural Resources of Canada Website it is located in Bonavista Bay.
