= Langue de Cerf =

Coordinates: 47.504°N 54.966°W

Location of Langue de Cerf in Newfoundland and Labrador

Langue de Cerf was a settlement in Newfoundland and Labrador. A small abandoned fishing community in Fortune Bay named after a nearby headland Lange de Cerf Head. The community was never large and had only a population of 45 in 1898. The community was largely abandoned following the loss of the schooner Omega which took the lives of many of the men of the community. Although it was still used as a summer fishing base, there were only 3 families remaining in 1935 comprising 24 people. The community was abandoned by 1947 with many of the residents moving to nearby St. Bernards The name means "Stag Head".
