= Red Cove, Newfoundland and Labrador =

Settlement in Newfoundland and Labrador, Canada

Coordinates: 47°32′02″N 55°37′05″W

Red Cove was a settlement which has been depopulated since 1968. It was located east of Burgeo.

== See also ==
- List of communities in Newfoundland and Labrador
- List of people of Newfoundland and Labrador
