= Baker's Tickle =

Ghost town in Newfoundland and Labrador, Canada

Coordinates: 47.6121°N 58.6820°W

Baker's Tickle was a Canadian fishing settlement in the Burgeo, Newfoundland and Labrador District of the province of Newfoundland and Labrador.

It is located near the community of Rose Bay, about 18 km east of Burnt Islands. It had a population of 15 in 1911.

Baker's Tickle is part of Rose Blanche parish.

Baker's Tickle has been inhabited since at least 1871. According to Lovell's 1871 Provincial Business Directory, Baker's Tickle is "A small fishing settlement on the south coast of the Island, district of Burgeo and La Poile. Distant from the Rose Blanche, 6 miles by boat. Mail fortnightly. Population 30". It lists the following as the inhabitants at that time:

Cock Albert, fisherman
Garrett Thomas, planter
Harding William, planter
Hatcher John, planter
Hinks John, fisherman

Two of the families living in Baker's Tickle in 1881 were the Amy family and the Parsons family (Newfoundland Archives Parish Records Collection Reel #36).

== See also ==
- List of ghost towns in Newfoundland and Labrador
