= Tickle Bay =

Bay in Newfoundland and Labrador, Canada

Coordinates: 47.649°N 53.764°W

Tickle Bay is a natural bay off the island of Newfoundland in the province of Newfoundland and Labrador, Canada.
