= Port Nelson, Newfoundland and Labrador =

Coordinates: 49.082°N 53.619°W

Location of Port Nelson in Newfoundland and Labrador

Port Nelson is a settlement in Newfoundland and Labrador.

Formerly known as Loo Cove and sometimes (incorrectly) as Loon Cove, the community of Port Nelson has now been abandoned.

See https://collections.mun.ca/digital/collection/cns_enl/id/2295
