= Zoar, Newfoundland and Labrador =

Ghost town in Newfoundland and Labrador, Canada

Coordinates: 56.133°N 61.384°W

Location of Zoar in Newfoundland and Labrador

Zoar was a settlement in Newfoundland and Labrador. It was settled in 1865 as one of several Moravian Church missions to the Inuit in Labrador, on the so-called "Moravian Coast," but was abandoned in 1889, one of the first such communities to be abandoned.

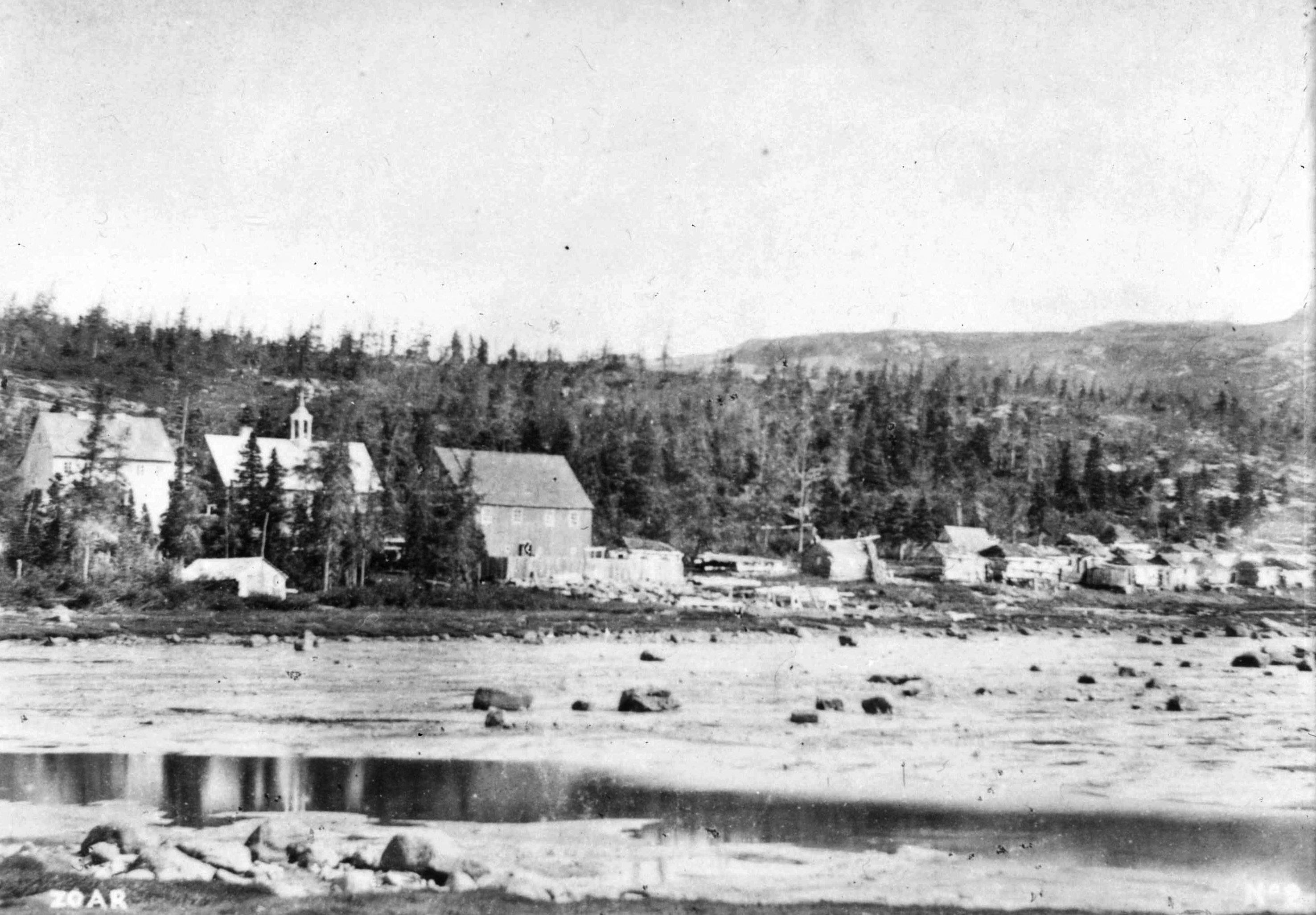
Zoar in the 1890s
