= Little Harbour Deep, Newfoundland and Labrador =

Settlement in Newfoundland and Labrador

Coordinates: 50°15′N 56°33′W

Little Harbour Deep was a settlement located northwest of Baie Verte. On July 31, 1965, the town was depopulated.

== See also ==
- List of communities in Newfoundland and Labrador
