= Comfort Bight =

Former settlement in Newfoundland and Labrador, Canada

Coordinates: 53.146°N 55.765°W

Location of Comfort Bight in Newfoundland and Labrador

Comfort Bight is a former settlement in Newfoundland and Labrador.

The fish producer and merchant, J.W. Hiscock Sons of Brigus, was founded here in 1894.
