= Conne, Fortune Bay =

Conne Big Conne Cove, Little Conne Cove
- Abandoned Community
- Location of Conne in Newfoundland
- Coordinates: 47°35′40.09″N 55°2′12.10″W
- Country: Canada
- Province: Newfoundland and Labrador
- Time zone: UTC-3:30 (Newfoundland Time)
  - Summer (DST): UTC-2:30 (Newfoundland Daylight)
- Area code: 709

Conne was a community in Newfoundland and Labrador, Canada located on the Northern shore of Fortune Bay. It was first reported to be settled in 1836, in the first Census of Newfoundland with sixteen inhabitants. It was a severely isolated settlement, which had no church or school and very little land for growing crops, and it based its existence on the inshore fishery of cod, lobster, salmon and herring.

== History ==
Conne's first inhabitants were the family of Edward Hatch. Hatch's family lived in the area from about 1835, his descendants living on in the area for at least another 70 years. By the 1870s the Dodge Family had also moved into the community and stayed for at least 20 years, before leaving for an unknown reason. Other family names later included Barnes, Fudge, and Giles

A small number of lobster factories operated between 1901 and 1921, and large amounts of salmon were reported to have been tinned in those years.
