= Thoroughfare, Newfoundland and Labrador =

Coordinates: 48°11′54″N 53°32′55″W

Thoroughfare is a locality or small settlement located east of Clarenville, Newfoundland and Labrador. The post office closed in 1966 and mail was collected at British Harbour. The population was 62 in 1940.

== See also ==
- List of communities in Newfoundland and Labrador
