= Lally Cove, Newfoundland and Labrador =

Vacated community in Newfoundland and Labrador

Coordinates: 47°39′N 55°22′W

Lally Cove
- Vacated settlement
- Interactive map of Lally Cove
- Country: Canada
- Province: Newfoundland and Labrador
- Location: North of Belleoram

Lally Cove was a settlement located north of Belleoram. The Way Office was established in 1886. The first Waymaster was Stephen Gould. The settlement was depopulated in 1966. It had a population of 49 in 1940, and 66 in 1956. This settlement was located near Fortune Bay and was resettled in modern-day Newfoundland and Labrador, Canada.

== See also ==
- List of communities in Newfoundland and Labrador
