= 1921 census of Newfoundland =

1921 census of Newfoundland was the ninth population census taken in Newfoundland and Labrador. The total population count in 1921 was 263,033, an 8.4% increase from 242,619 in the 1911 census.

== History ==
The original census was organized in the order of the houses on the street or path in each community. People living next door to each other or within the same house would be identified by the order of the names in the census. The 1921 census was the only census taken in Newfoundland to have the question, "Are you Micmac Indian?", as there were many Mi'kmaq people in Newfoundland at the time. The "Report on the Census of Newfoundland and Labrador, 1921" explains the census after it was taken. "The census was taken under the Cap. 20, Consolidated Statutes (Third Series), which directed that the population of the Colony be enumerated between the months of June and December in the year of 1921. In the early part of 1921, the necessary forms for the work of the census were prepared."

In July, 1921, each electoral district was subdivided into divisions and the enumerators were appointed to each division. The forms were sent to these enumerators and they commenced the work of taking the census. One enumerator was appointed for Labrador. A Bishop Martin, of Nain, enumerated the far northern Moravian Mission stations in Labrador. Copies of each enumerators returns were given to the respective clergymen in each division and the correctness of the census depended in a great measure upon the assistance in checking with the various clergymen in the island.
