= Port Anne, Newfoundland and Labrador =

Coordinates: 47.383°N 54.718°W

Location of Port Anne in Newfoundland and Labrador

Port Anne is a settlement in Newfoundland and Labrador.

Port Anne was located on Burnt island and was once a settlement of approximately 125 people. As part of the Newfoundland Government resettlement program, residents mostly left Port Ann in the mid to late 1960’s.
