= Gaff Topsails =

Coordinates: 49°08′34″N 56°39′07″W

Gaff Topsail is an abandoned railway settlement located in the interior of Newfoundland, Canada, between the communities of Millertown Junction to the east and Kitty's Brook to the west. The population was entirely composed of railway workers who worked on the Newfoundland Railway and their families.

The Topsails takes its name from the surrounding landscape which includes Main Topsail, Mizzen Topsail, Gaff Topsail and Fore Topsail which are geologically classified as monadnocks. The Topsails rise 61–122 metres (200–400 feet) above the general surface of the central plateau of Newfoundland. It is a barren land, rocky and windswept and in winter is renowned for its tremendous snowdrifts. The area is known for its spectacular scenery and in winter the huge snowdrifts that played havoc with the railway.

== See also ==
- List of communities in Newfoundland and Labrador
- Millertown Railway
- Newfoundland Railway
- Patrick Kavanagh (Canadian writer): Gaff Topsails (novel)
