= Little Paradise, Newfoundland and Labrador =

Settlement in Newfoundland and Labrador, Canada

Coordinates: 47°22′N 54°35′W

Little Paradise was a settlement in the Canadian province of Newfoundland and Labrador, located in Placentia. It was depopulated on July 31, 1968.

Off coast of Petit Fort and close to its sistering town Great Paradise, Little Paradise is a resettled community. Former inhabitants of these towns still come back during the summertime and use the old houses as cabins. Though many houses are long fallen, and some too old and unsafe to enter, the oldest standing home in Great Paradise is the Power house. Estimated to be over 100 years old, the Powers keep this house looking new and take much pride in their small town they call home.

== See also ==
- List of communities in Newfoundland and Labrador
