= Presque, Newfoundland and Labrador =

Coordinates: 47.399°N 54.513°W

Location of Presque in Newfoundland and Labrador

Presque is a settlement in the Canadian province of Newfoundland and Labrador, located near Placentia Bay.
