= Tickles, Newfoundland and Labrador =

Former settlement in Newfoundland and Labrador, Canada

Coordinates: 47°09′16″N 53°34′19″W

Tickles was a small settlement with seven families. It is located in the Placentia and St. Mary's District. It had a population of 61 in 1951 and 58 in 1956.

== See also ==
- List of communities in Newfoundland and Labrador
