= Locks Cove, Newfoundland and Labrador =

Coordinates: 51°20′16″N 55°57′20″W

Locks Cove (Newfoundland)

Locks Cove was a settlement located three miles west of St. Anthony, Newfoundland and Labrador, in Canada. The first postmistress was Gladys Rachel Elliott in 1955. The post office opened in 1955 and closed in 1967. It had a population of 28 in 1901 and 66 in 1956. According to the 1901 census, most of the population was involved in catching and/or curing fish. The settlement was abandoned in 1965. There are at least two other settlements that were named "Locks Cove" or Lock's Cove" on Newfoundland.

== See also ==
- List of communities in Newfoundland and Labrador
