= Henley Harbour =

Ghost town in Newfoundland and Labrador, Canada

Coordinates: 51°59′44″N 55°51′06″W

Fort York
- Henley Harbour

Site information
- Type: Fortress, garrisoned and armoured

Site history
- Built: 1740
- In use: 1766-1796
- Battles/wars: French and Indian War

Garrison information
- Garrison: Great Britain

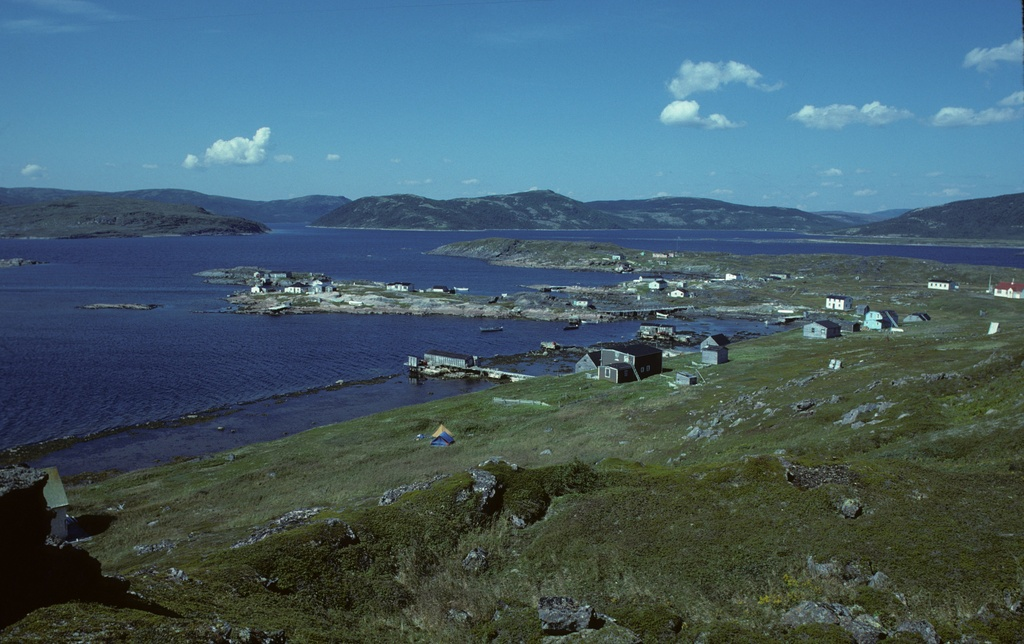
Henley Harbour

Henley Harbour is a ghost town in the Canadian province of Newfoundland and Labrador. It is located on the south coast of Labrador.
