= Chimney Tickle =

Settlement in Newfoundland and Labrador, Canada

Coordinates: 52.164°N 55.695°W

Location of Chimney Tickle in Newfoundland and Labrador

Chimney Tickle is a settlement in the Canadian province of Newfoundland and Labrador.
