= Mosquito, Newfoundland and Labrador =

Settlement in Newfoundland and Labrador, Canada

Coordinates: 46.987°N 53.684°W

Location of Mosquito in Newfoundland and Labrador

Mosquito was a former settlement in Newfoundland and Labrador.
