= Little Bay Islands =

Vacant town in Newfoundland and Labrador, Canada

- Town
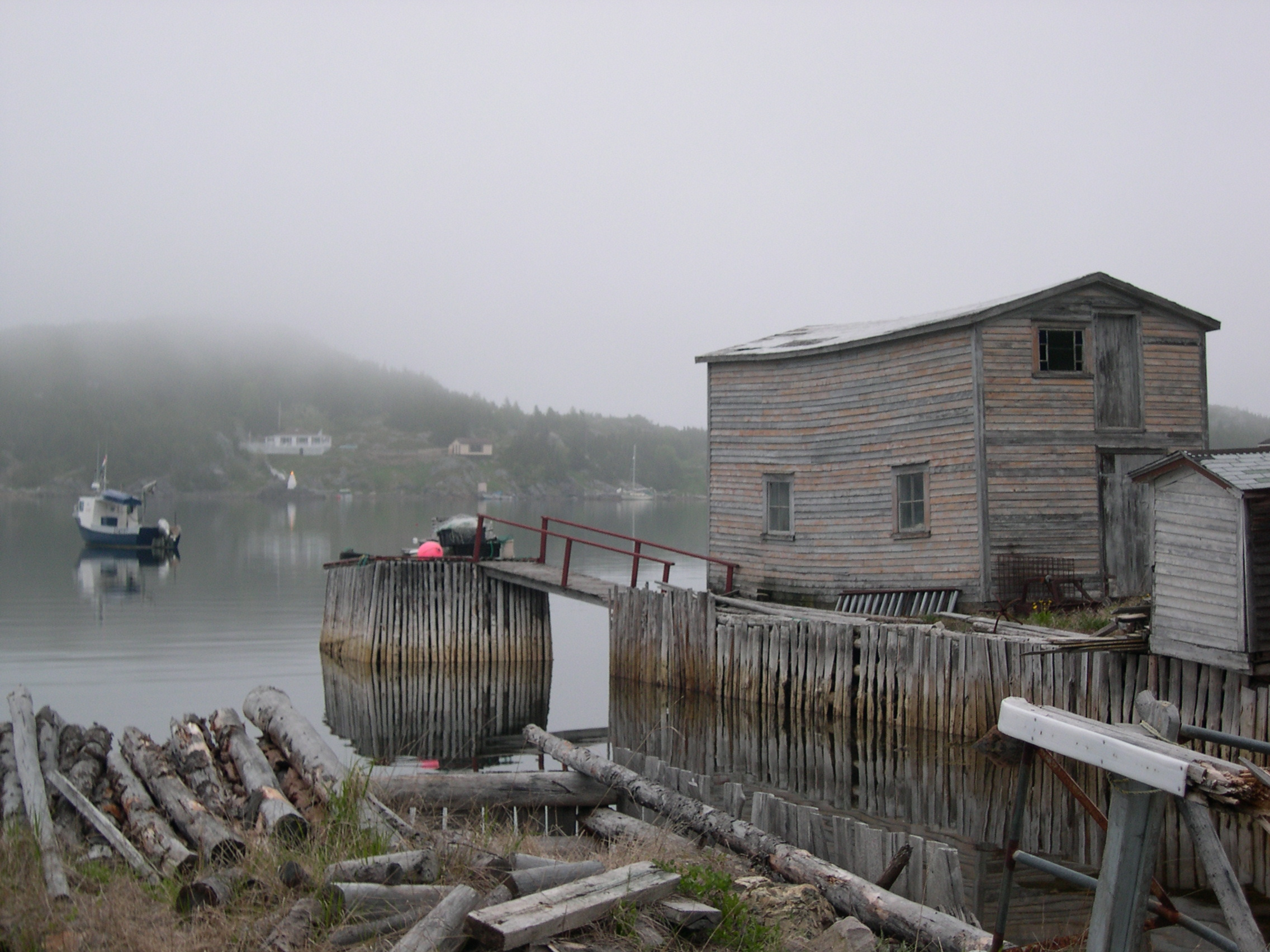
- A dock in Little Bay Islands

- Location of Little Bay Islands in Newfoundland
- Coordinates: 49.64417°N 55.79059°W
- Country: Canada
- Province: Newfoundland and Labrador

Population (2020)
  - Total: 2
- Time zone: UTC-3:30 (Newfoundland Time)
  - Summer (DST): UTC-2:30 (Newfoundland Daylight)
- Area code: 709

Little Bay Islands is a largely vacant town, in Newfoundland and Labrador, Canada. It was an outport community which subsisted for nearly two centuries until the fishing industry in the area collapsed in the late 20th century. In addition to Little Bay Island proper, it includes Mack's Island (connected by bridge), Goat Island, Harbour Island, and Boatswain Tickle Island.

In 2019, the permanent residents voted to be relocated and nearly all of the 55 residents departed by the end of the year. This was part of a relocation program operated by the provincial government for small communities that had become expensive to service. Property owners who were permanent residents were paid at least $250,000 in compensation for relocation expenses. Two residents decided to stay, living off the grid and installing solar panels and wireless internet. Some of the residents who relocated would still return to the town and live there occasionally.

== History ==
The first documented settlement at Little Bay Islands was established around 1825. At its height in the 1940s, it had a population of about 550 people. It began to face economic hardship in the 1950s as local fishers faced competition from large-scale bottom trawling by British and other fishing fleets, which decimated fish populations. It declined substantially following a cod fishing moratorium, imposed in 1992 to allow fish populations to recover.

The main remaining employer – a crab processing plant – closed in 2010. By 2016, the town had a population of about 71, down 27 percent from 2011. At that time, the community had a school (used by two children and their teacher), a fire station, two churches, and a bed and breakfast. The school and one of the churches later closed. In 2018, the community had only three paying jobs (the postmaster and two janitors); the other residents are mostly retirees.

=== Relocation ===
Resettlement proposals by the provincial government – part of ongoing programs to relocate residents of remote communities to reduce the costs of supporting them – were rejected by residents in 2011 and 2016, with the latter failing to reach the 90% threshold by a single vote. In February 2019, the 95 eligible voters unanimously approved resettlement.

The total paid was approximately $8.7 million. The government estimated that the relocation would save about $20 million over 20 years; a large portion from cancellation of the ferry service. The province's relocation program had saved about $30 million since it commenced in 2002. A previous recentralization program, running from 1954 to 1975, resettled some 28,000 people from 300 remote locations.

Two inhabitants – Georgina and Michael Parsons – opted to stay on the island continuously. Others left open the possibility of returning to live there in summer, which was allowed because the relocation plan consisted of relocation assistance rather than a buyout of their homes, with the understanding that there would be no government services. The Parsons had not been eligible to vote on relocation, since they had not lived in the community for an adequate amount of time. They chose to live off the grid in their recently built home with a well to provide drinking water, a propane oven, wood stoves, satellite internet connection, a solar panel system, a snowmobile, a cell phone, and boats to travel to the mainland to purchase supplies.

On 31 December 2019, power to Little Bay Islands was cut at 2:30 p.m. and the last ferry – MV Hazel McIsaac – left the dock at about 5:00 p.m.

== Demographics ==
Historical populations
| Year | Pop. | ±% |
|---|---|---|
| 1921 | 330 | — |
| 1945 | 550 | +66.7% |
| 1956 | 534 | −2.9% |
| 1961 | 426 | −20.2% |
| 1966 | 426 | +0.0% |
| 1971 | 394 | −7.5% |
| 1976 | 422 | +7.1% |
| 1981 | 407 | −3.6% |
| 1986 | 376 | −7.6% |
| 1991 | 260 | −30.9% |
| 1996 | 240 | −7.7% |
| 2001 | 175 | −27.1% |
| 2006 | 155 | −11.4% |
| 2011 | 100 | −35.5% |
| 2016 | 71 | −29.0% |
| 2021 | 0 | −100.0% |
Source: Statistics Canada

In the 2021 Census of Population conducted by Statistics Canada, Little Bay Islands had a population of 0 living in 1 of its 1 total private dwellings, a change of −100% from its 2016 population of 71. With a land area of 7.34 km^{2} (2.83 sq mi), it had a population density of 0.0/km^{2} (0.0/sq mi) in 2021.

Historical population
| Year | Pop. | ±% |

== See also ==
- List of communities in Newfoundland and Labrador
- Resettlement (Newfoundland)
