= Isle Valen, Newfoundland and Labrador =

Human settlement in Newfoundland and Labrador, Canada

Coordinates: 47°29′N 54°24′W

Isle Valen or Valen Island, was a settlement on Isle Valen in Newfoundland and Labrador. Travelling Methodist Minister John Lewis recorded a population of 53 on the "Isle of Vallin" in an informal census of Placentia West in December of 1817. It was established as Isle of Valen in 1856 as a small community with 23 families. The Way Office was changed to Post Office in 1891. The name was changed to its present calling before 1968. It was depopulated on September 17, 1968.

== See also ==
- List of ghost towns in Newfoundland and Labrador
