= Pushthrough =

Resettled community in Newfoundland and Labrador

Dawson Point Lighthouse
- Location: Pushthrough, Newfoundland and Labrador, Canada
- Coordinates: 47°38′37″N 56°08′58″W

Tower
- Constructed: 1916
- Foundation: concrete base
- Construction: metal skeletal tower
- Height: 4 m (13 ft)
- Shape: square prism metal tower
- Markings: red daymark with a single white horizontal band
- Power source: solar power
- Operator: Canadian Coast Guard

Light
- Focal height: 17 m (56 ft)
- Range: 16 nmi (30 km; 18 mi)
- Characteristic: Fl W 5s

Location of Pushthrough in Newfoundland and Labrador

Pushthrough is a resettled fishing community located on Newfoundland and Labrador's south coast, about 20 km northwest of Hermitage. Permanent settlement at Pushthrough happened in 1814, when George Chambers moved there from Gaultois to establish a fishing room (a place for drying and storing fish) and later a store. The community lost population to Gaultois in the 1950s and to Head of Bay d'Espoir in the 1960s. The population peaked at 247 in 1961. In 1968, virtually all the families with school aged children moved, effectively leading to the downfall of the community. The Dawson Point lighthouse is located nearby.

== Notable people ==
- Weston E. Vivian – American politician (1924–2020)

== See also ==
- List of lighthouses in Canada
