= Hermitage Bay =

Coordinates: 47°35′N 56°06′W

Location of Hermitage Bay in Newfoundland

Hermitage Bay is an expansive bay stretching out along the south coast of Newfoundland. It is a body of Gulf of St. Lawrence which is near the Connaigre Peninsula. On its south side, it is bordered by the Hermitage peninsula and the communities of Seal Cove (Fortune Bay), Hermitage and Sandyville. On its north side, it is flanked by the communities of McCallum on mainland Newfoundland and by Gaultois on Long Island. Long Island separates Hermitage Bay from Bay d'Espoir further inland to the north.
