= Placentia Bay =

Body of water on the southeast coast of Newfoundland, Canada

Coordinates: 47°15′03″N 54°15′32″W

Location of Placentia Bay in Newfoundland

Placentia Bay (French: Baie de Plaisance) is a body of water on the southeast coast of Newfoundland, Canada. It is formed by Burin Peninsula on the west and Avalon Peninsula on the east. Fishing grounds in the bay were used by native people long before the first European fishermen arrived in the 16th century. For a time, the French controlled the bay. They built their capital at Placentia on the east coast. The British gained Placentia during the Treaty of Utrecht in 1713. The town and nearby Castle Hill are national historic sites. English settlement followed in the bay and today the main communities are Burin, Marystown, and Placentia.

On 14 August 1941, US Naval Station Argentia, in Little Placentia Sound, was the site of the Atlantic Conference for the Atlantic Charter. Winston Churchill and Franklin D. Roosevelt met face to face there for the first time since both had taken office.
