= Glovers Harbour, Newfoundland and Labrador =

Glovers Harbour Thimble Tickle
- Local service district / designated place
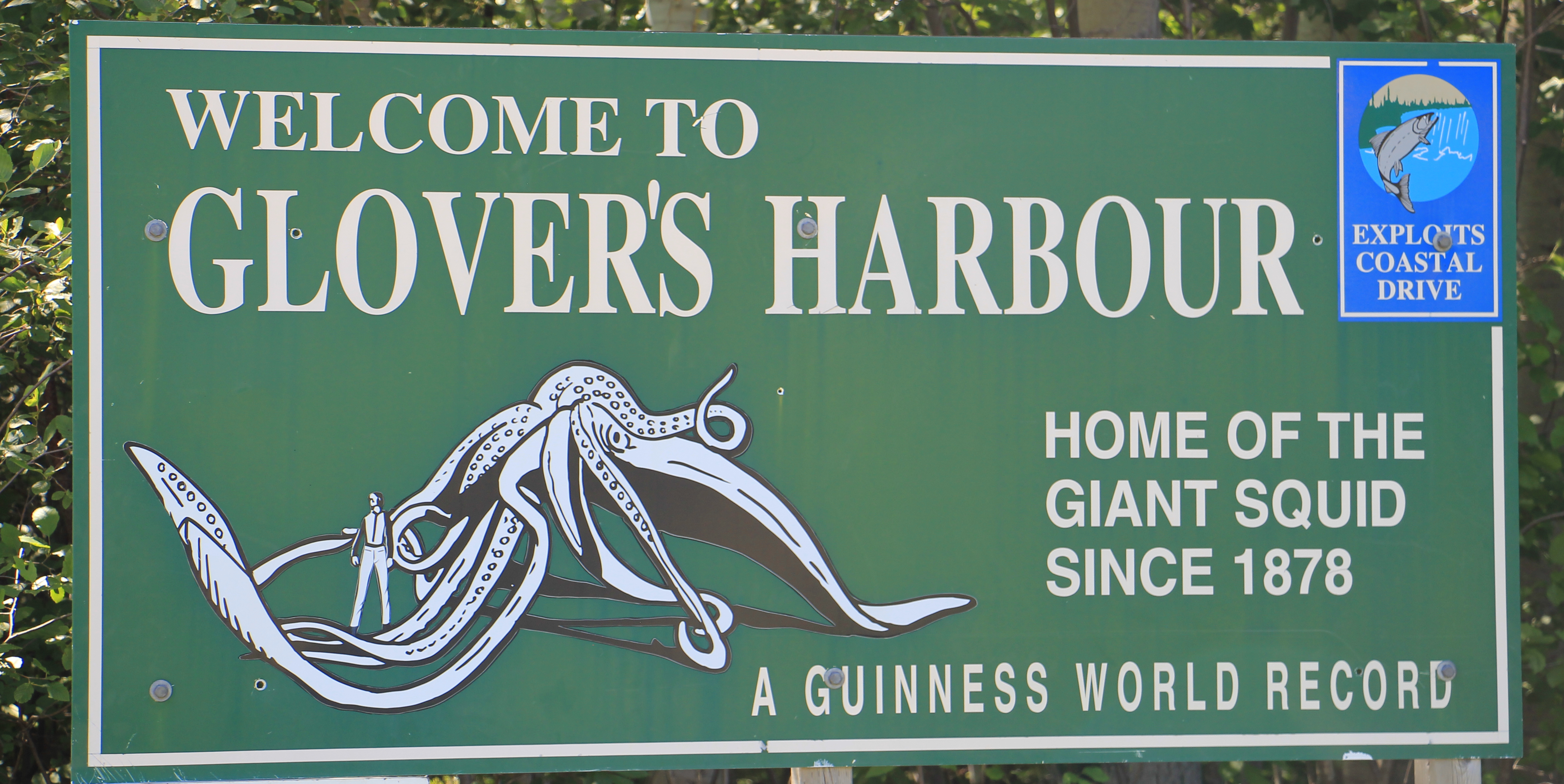
- Welcome sign referencing the giant squid specimen of 1878 and its recognition by Guinness World Records
- Interactive map of Glovers Harbour
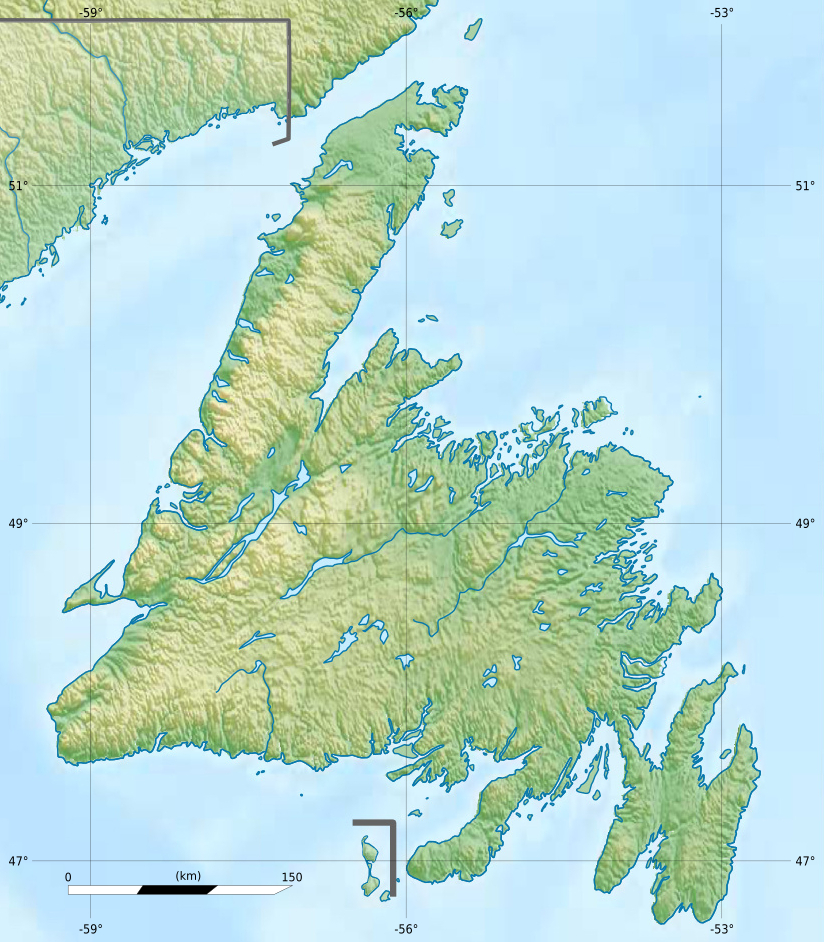
- Location within Newfoundland Location within Canada
- Coordinates: 49°27′13″N 55°28′55″W
- Country: Canada
- Province: Newfoundland and Labrador
- Electoral district: Coast of Bays–Central–Notre Dame (federal); Exploits (provincial)
- Census division: 8 (subdivision E)
- Settled: late 1800s (≤1878)
- Founder: Joseph Martin
- Named for: John Hawley Glover

Area
  - Total: 8.42 km^{2} (3.25 sq mi)
- Elevation: 0–20 m (0–66 ft)

Population (2021 census)
  - Total: 55
  - Density: 6.5/km^{2} (17/sq mi)
- Time zone: UTC−03:30 (NST)
  - Summer (DST): UTC−02:30 (NDT)
- Postal code: A0H 1E0
- Area code: 709 (COC: 483)
- NTS map no.: 002E06
- GNBC code: AAIAE
- Highways: Route 350 (via Route 350-21; Glovers Harbour Rd.)
- Website: www.facebook.com/GloversHarbourNl/

Glovers Harbour (Note: Sometimes written with an apostrophe, especially historically, though also more recently, including on the community's welcome sign.) (/ˈɡloʊ.vərz/ GLOH-verz), formerly known as Thimble Tickle(s), is an unincorporated community and harbour in the Canadian province of Newfoundland and Labrador. It is located in Notre Dame Bay on the northern coast of the island of Newfoundland. As a local service district, it is led by an elected committee that is responsible for the delivery of certain essential services. It is delineated as a designated place for statistical purposes.

Settled sometime in the second half of the 19th century, Glovers Harbour has remained primarily a fishing village throughout its history. It is best known for the giant squid that was captured on its shores in 1878, which was subsequently recognised as a world record by Guinness. Glovers Harbour brands itself as the "home of the giant squid" and has a small heritage centre and "life-sized" sculpture dedicated to the animal, these being its main tourist attractions.

== History ==
The settlement was named after John Hawley Glover, who served as the Governor of Newfoundland in 1876–1881 and again in 1883–1885.

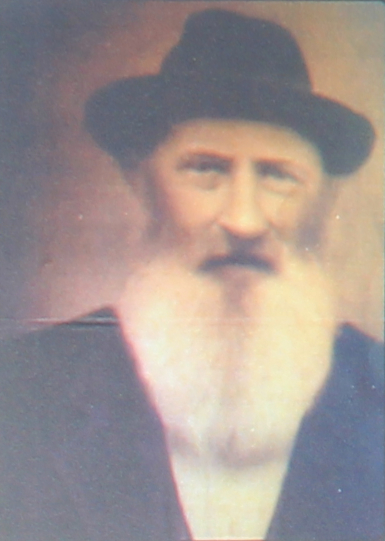
Joseph Martin (1838–1920), founder of Glovers Harbour, pictured around 1880

=== Early years ===
According to local tradition, Glovers Harbour was founded by Joseph Martin, originally of Harbour Grace, (Note: Lovell's Province of Newfoundland Directory for 1871 lists two people by this name residing in Harbour Grace—a carpenter and a labourer.) who settled there sometime in the late 1800s. Martin's daughter married the son of George Marsh, the first permanent settler of nearby Winter House Cove, and the two families remained the main inhabitants of Glovers Harbour until the arrival of Alex Boone, previously of Cottrell's Cove.

Glovers Harbour first appeared in census records in the 1901 Newfoundland census under the name Glover Harbor. Its population was recorded as 67, though this included the inhabitants of Leading Tickles and Lock's Harbour (later Lockesport(e) or Lockport). In the 1911 Newfoundland census, it was listed as Glover's Harbor, with a population of 28 Newfoundland-born residents, predominantly followers of the Church of England, though one Methodist was also recorded. The population fell to a low of 11 at the time of the 1921 census but rebounded to 29 in 1935 and 38 in 1945.

=== Resettlement period ===
From its founding, small-scale inshore cod fishing was the mainstay of the local economy, supplemented by seasonal work such as logging as well as livestock and vegetable farming. By the middle of the 20th century, however, a lack of transport infrastructure left the isolated residents of Glovers Harbour with few other job opportunities. The 1962 construction of a road connecting Glovers Harbour to Route 350 was transformative, as it opened access to the commercially important town of Botwood and to the nearby fish markets of Leading Tickles and Point Leamington. Movement of people from more isolated nearby communities to Glovers Harbour soon followed, largely motivated by a Newfoundland-wide government resettlement program, though some early moves occurred without government assistance.

Despite being larger at the time, the neighbouring communities of Lockesporte and Winter House Cove (both located in Seal Bay) were never connected to the road network owing to the difficulty of the surrounding terrain, and this contributed to their rapid decline and eventual abandonment by the close of the 1960s. As recorded in the 1971 census, eight families totalling 39 people (predominantly with the surname Haggett) had moved to Glovers Harbour from Lockesporte alone. (Note: The remainder resettled to Leading Tickles, Point Leamington, and Deer Lake.) At least four families (Burton, followed by Goudie, Haggett, and Rowsell) had similarly resettled from Winter House Cove by this point. As a result, the population of Glovers Harbour swelled almost threefold between 1966 and 1971, from 52 to 145.

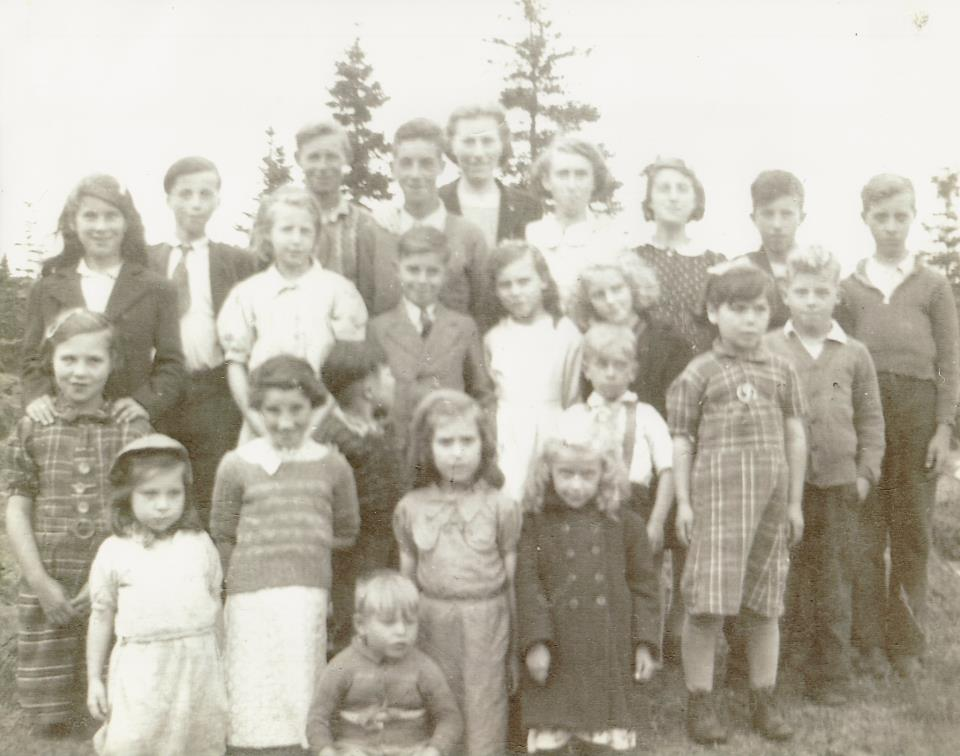
Salvation Army Sunday school in Lock's Harbour, c. 1945. Numbering around two dozen children, it included pupils from Glovers Harbour and Winter House Cove.

Historical population

Year	Pop.	±%
1901	67*	—
1911	28	—
1921	11	−60.7%
1935	29	+163.6%
1945	38	+31.0%
1951	44	+15.8%
1956	55	+25.0%
1961	38	−30.9%
1966	52	+36.8%
1971	145	+178.8%

Year	Pop.	±%
1976	127	−12.4%
1981	136	+7.1%
1986	132	−2.9%
1991	122	−7.6%
1996	121	−0.8%
2001	112	−7.4%
2006	93	−17.0%
2011^{§}	78	−16.1%
2016	92	+17.9%
2021	55	−40.2%

* Included inhabitants of Leading Tickles and Lock's Harbour.
^{§} Population initially reported as 71 but later revised to 78. (Note: Per Statistics Canada, Glovers Harbour "underwent a boundary change since the 2011 Census that resulted in an adjustment to the 2011 population and/or dwelling counts for the area".)

The concomitant demographic changes turned Glovers Harbour into "a predominantly Salvation Army community". The village's first Salvation Army citadel—which also served Lockesporte, Ward's Point, and Winter House Cove, and doubled up as a school—was erected on land belonging to Electra Martin. This was followed by a second citadel, originally constructed near Flag Pond around 1942, that was later moved close to Glovers Harbour Road.

During resettlement, Winter House Cove's Anglican church—a school chapel first recorded in the 1901 census—was floated (transported over water) to Glovers Harbour, where it found use as a school until the late 1960s. Both this school and another one that had been built in Glovers Harbour by the 1960s were later closed; thereafter, students attended elementary school in Leading Tickles and high school in Point Leamington, which were reached by school bus. The Anglican church was subsequently renovated and held fortnightly services presided over by a visiting minister from Botwood.

From its peak following resettlement, the population of Glovers Harbour dropped to 136 by 1981 and continued to gradually contract over the next three decades.

=== Contemporary history ===
Over time, the fishery in Glovers Harbour has diversified to encompass lobster, capelin, squid, and queen crab (also known as snow crab). In 1997, a proposal was submitted to recognise the coastal area around Leading Tickles and Glovers Harbour as a Marine Protected Area (MPA). On 8 June 2001, the area officially came under consideration to become an MPA when it was identified as an Area of Interest by the minister for the Department of Fisheries and Oceans (DFO).

== Geography ==
Glovers Harbour is in Newfoundland within Subdivision E of Division No. 8.

A promontory on the southern shore of Glovers Harbour is known as Glovers Point. Glovers Harbour also gives its name to the Glovers Harbour Formation, a sequence of volcanic rocks of the Wild Bight Group that lie to its west. Other geographical points of interest include an unmarked trail called Rowsell's Trail.

Glovers Harbour is surrounded "by rolling green hillsides and glacial lakes, making it incredibly picturesque for those who have never visited Newfoundland before".

=== Thimble Tickle ===
Glovers Harbour was formerly known as Thimble Tickle(s). In Newfoundland English, a tickle is a narrow strait (see List of tickles). The name Thimble Tickle (and variants thereof) has been applied to a number of related geographical features. The Gazetteer of Canada of 1968 lists Thimble Tickles (a series of channels), Thimble Head, and Thimble Tickle Head (both headlands) as features in the same general area. Other associated geographical names include Cumlins Cove and Cumlins Head, both listed by the Gazetteer as features of Thimble Tickle(s). According to the Encyclopedia of Newfoundland and Labrador, Thimble Tickles is a "scattered group of islands" in the vicinity of Glovers Harbour. It has also been described as "a passage between several islands south of Leading Tickles and a few kilometres north of Glovers Harbour".

Thimble Tickle Prospect, also known as the Lockport Mine (after Lockport), was a copper and sulfur mine located "over the hill" and just west of Glovers Harbour. It operated intermittently in the 1880s and 1890s; the shafts were sealed around 1999.

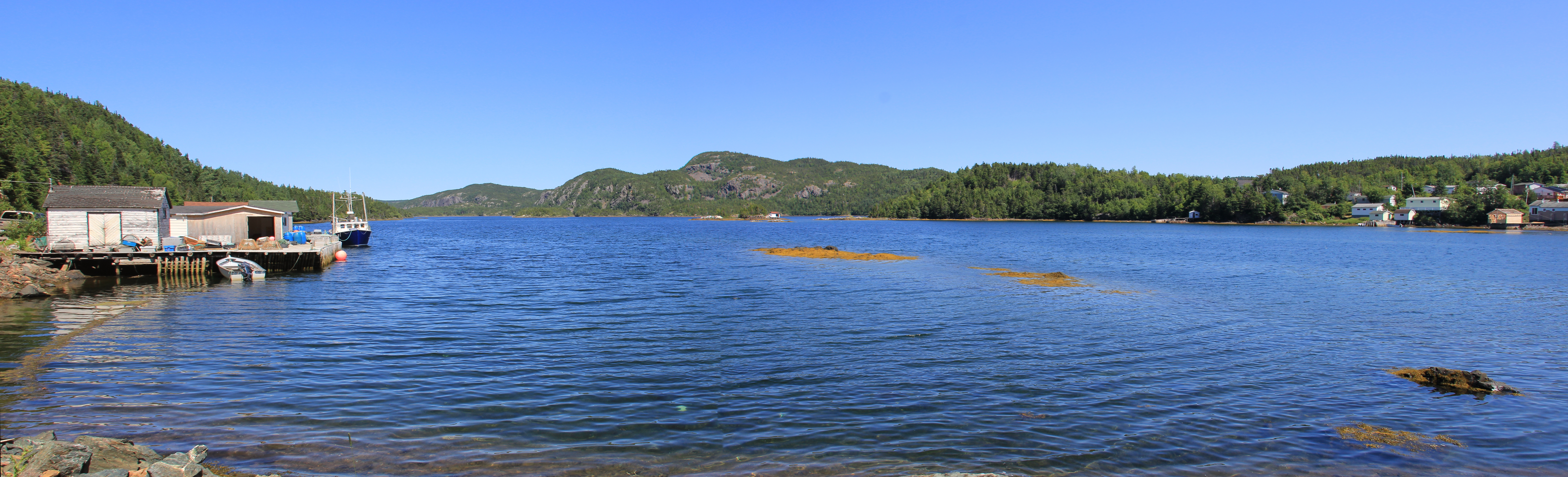
Panoramic view of Glovers Harbour taken from the southwestern corner of the shoreline looking northeast, July 2017

== Demographics ==
As a designated place in the 2021 Census of Population conducted by Statistics Canada, Glovers Harbour recorded a population of 55 living in 28 of its 39 total private dwellings, a change of −40.2% from its 2016 population of 92. With a land area of 8.42 km^{2} (3.25 sq mi), it had a population density of 6.5/km^{2} (16.9/sq mi) in 2021.

The 2016 census recorded a median value of dwellings of CA$100,161 (equivalent to US$75,570 in 2025). The median total household income was CA$61,824 (equivalent to US$46,646 in 2025).

Historical population of Glovers Harbour as recorded in national censuses since 1911 (Note: The count from the 1901 census has been omitted as it included the inhabitants of Leading Tickles and Lock's Harbour.)

Year	Pop.	±%
1911	28	—
1921	11	−60.7%
1935	29	+163.6%
1945	38	+31.0%
1951	44	+15.8%
1956	55	+25.0%
1961	38	−30.9%
1966	52	+36.8%
1971	145	+178.8%
1976	127	−12.4%

Year	Pop.	±%
1981	136	+7.1%
1986	132	−2.9%
1991	122	−7.6%
1996	121	−0.8%
2001	112	−7.4%
2006	93	−17.0%
2011	78	−16.1%
2016	92	+17.9%
2021	55	−40.2%

Source data

== Governance ==
Glovers Harbour is a local service district (LSD) that is governed by a committee responsible for the provision of certain services to the community. The chair of the LSD committee is Ida Haggett.

== Giant squid ==
=== Thimble Tickle specimen ===
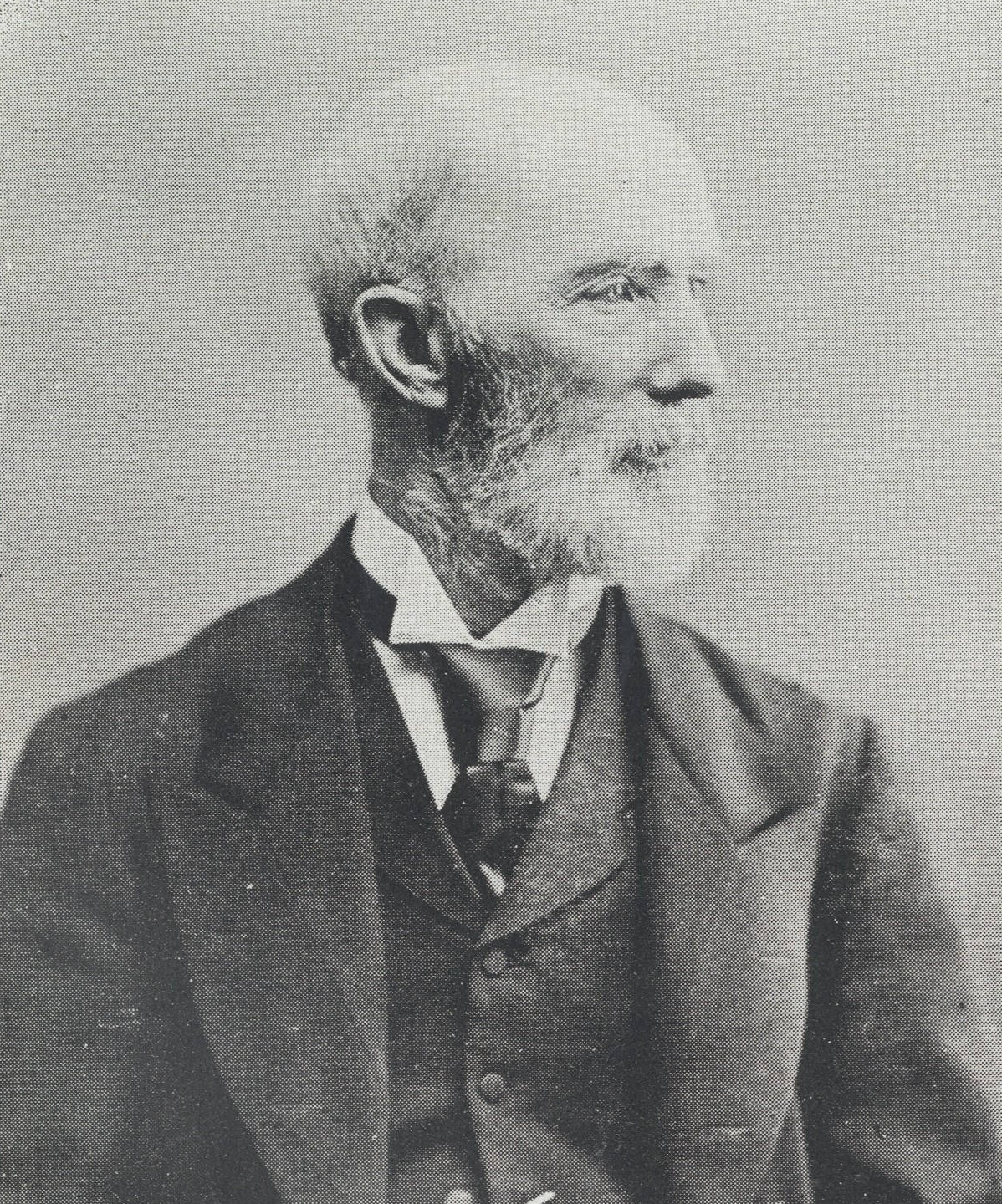
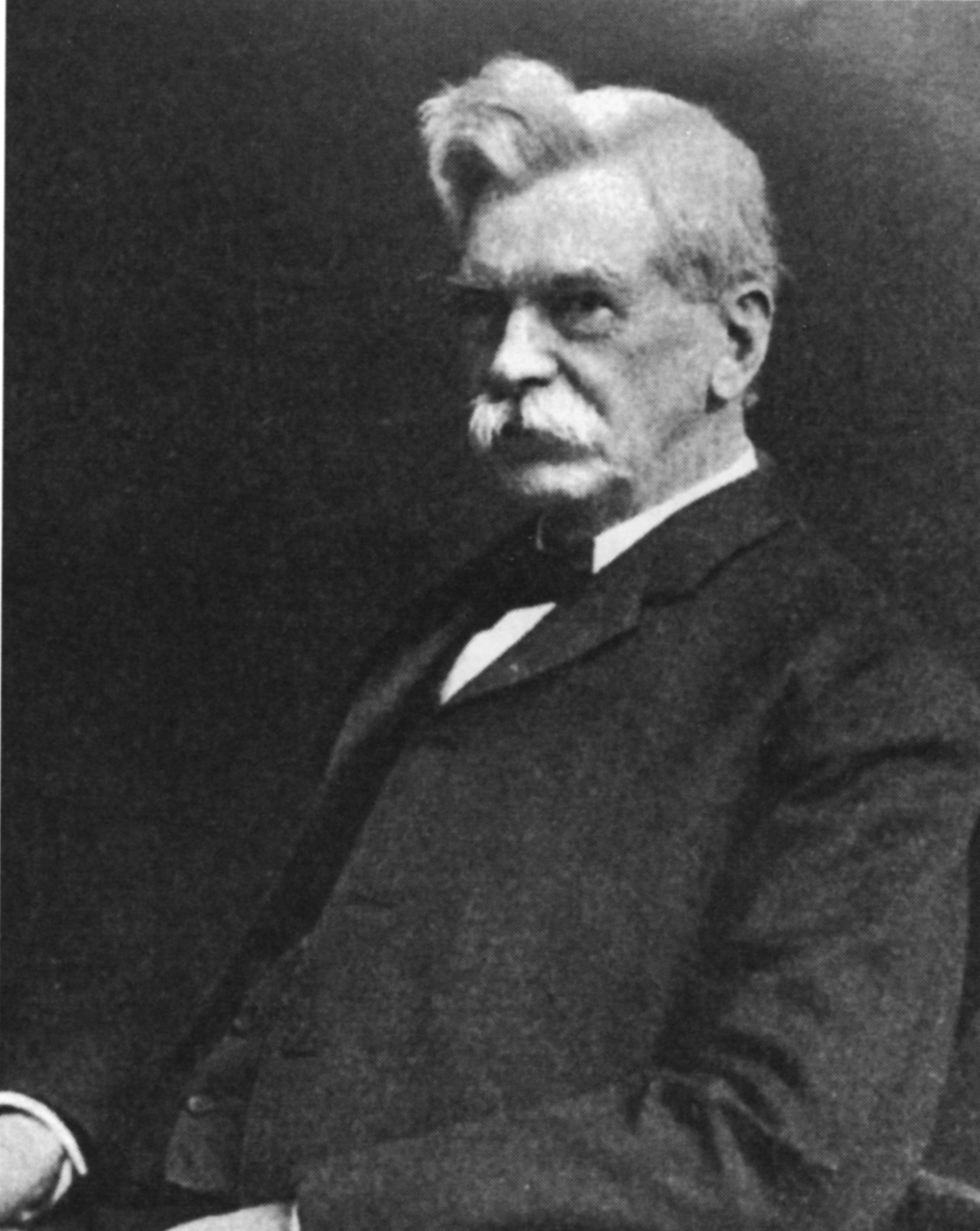
Clergyman and amateur naturalist Moses Harvey (1820–1901; left) and zoologist Addison Emery Verrill (1839–1926), whose writings brought the "Thimble Tickle specimen" to wider attention

Glovers Harbour is best known for its association with the giant squid (Architeuthis dux). On 2 November 1878, a live animal reportedly 55 ft (16.8 m) long, which came to be known as the "Thimble Tickle specimen", was found aground offshore. It was secured to a tree with a grapnel and rope and died as the tide receded. No parts of the animal were saved and no photographs or exact measurements exist as the specimen was cut up for dog food soon after its discovery; practically all that is known of it comes from a second-hand account by Reverend Moses Harvey in a letter to the Boston Traveller dated 30 January 1879, which was reproduced in the works of Yale zoologist Addison Emery Verrill the following year:

On the 2d day of November last, Stephen Sherring, a fisherman residing in Thimble Tickle, not far from the locality where the other devil-fish [the "Three Arms specimen"], was cast ashore, was out in a boat with two other men; not far from the shore they observed some bulky object, and, supposing it might be part of a wreck, they rowed toward it, and, to their horror, found themselves close to a huge fish, having large glassy eyes, which was making desperate efforts to escape, and churning the water into foam by the motion of its immense arms and tail. It was aground and the tide was ebbing. From the funnel at the back of its head it was ejecting large volumes of water, this being its method of moving backward, the force of the stream, by the reaction of the surrounding medium, driving it in the required direction. At times the water from the siphon was black as ink.

Finding the monster partially disabled, the fishermen plucked up courage and ventured near enough to throw the grapnel of their boat, the sharp flukes of which, having barbed points, sunk into the soft body. To the grapnel they had attached a stout rope which they had carried ashore and tied to a tree, so as to prevent the fish from going out with the tide. It was a happy thought, for the devil fish found himself effectually moored to the shore. His struggles were terrific as he flung his ten arms about in dying agony. The fishermen took care to keep a respectful distance from the long tentacles, which ever and anon darted out like great tongues from the central mass. At length it became exhausted, and as the water receded it expired.

The fishermen, alas! knowing no better, proceeded to convert it into dog's meat. It was a splendid specimen—the largest yet taken—the body measuring 20 feet [6.1 m] from the beak to the extremity of the tail. It was thus exactly double the size of the New York specimen [better known as the "Catalina specimen"], and five feet [1.5 m] longer than the one taken by [fisherman William] Budgell [the "Three Arms specimen"]. The circumference of the body is not stated, but one of the arms measured 35 feet [10.7 m]. This must have been a tentacle.

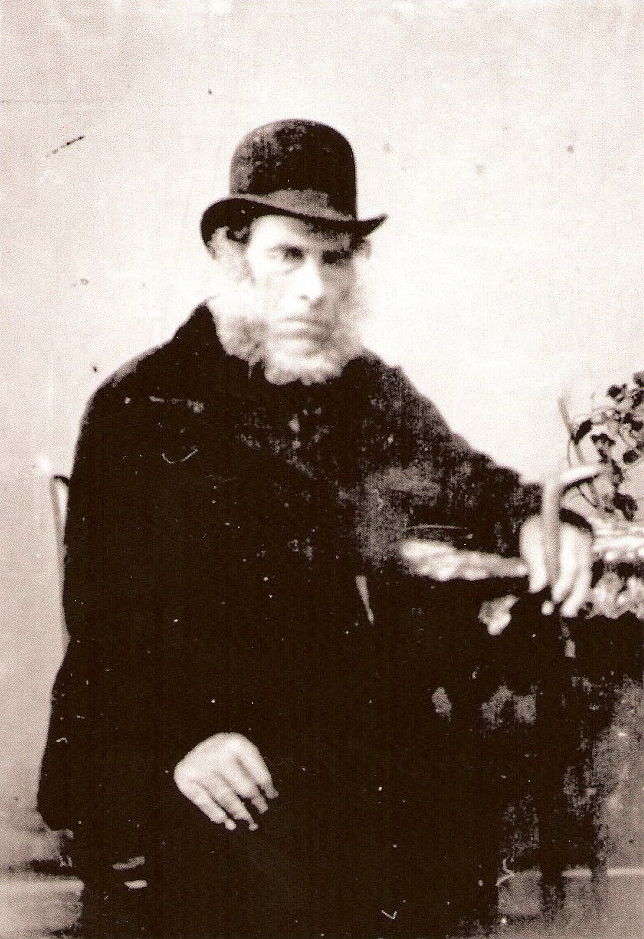
George Marsh (1825–1911) may have been involved in the capture of the giant squid. He and his wife Louisa were the first permanent settlers of Winter House Cove c. 1858.

Though the original account mentions only Stephen Sherring and two other (unnamed) fishermen, later sources identify Glovers Harbour's founder, Joseph Martin, as one of the fishermen involved in the squid's capture. George Marsh and Henry Rowsell—the founders of Winter House Cove and Lock's Harbour (Lockesporte), respectively—have also been suggested as participants. The fishermen may have learned of Moses Harvey's interest in the giant squid when the latter visited Notre Dame Bay only a couple of months earlier, in August 1878, as part of a geological survey. A CBC News report broadcast in 2004 features Maurice Martin, great-great-grandson of Joseph Martin, recounting the story of the squid's capture as told to him by his grandfather.

The "Thimble Tickle specimen" has long (Note: An early example comes from the 1968 edition of the Guinness Book of World Records, which gives an erroneous provenance (corrected by the 1971 edition): The heaviest of all invertebrate animals is the Atlantic giant squid (Architeuthis princeps). The largest specimen ever recorded was one measuring 55 feet [16.8 m] overall, captured on November 2, 1878, after it had run aground on Thimble Tickle, one of the Thimble Islands off the coast of Connecticut [sic]. Its eyes were 9 inches [23 cm] in diameter. For comparison, the first US edition, titled The Guinness Book of Superlatives and published in 1956, gives more modest maximum dimensions: The giant squid (Architeuthis) found on the Newfoundland Banks may have a body length of 8 feet [2.4 m] and measure up to 40 feet [12 m] overall. These measurements closely agree with current understanding of the giant squid's maximum size.) been recognised by Guinness World Records and its prior incarnations as the largest giant squid ever recorded. However, the reported measurements—particularly the length of the "body [..] from the beak to the extremity of the tail" (i.e. mantle plus head) at 20 ft (6.1 m), but also the total length of 55 ft (16.8 m)—greatly exceed all modern, scientifically verified records, which encompass several hundred specimens. Such lengths are now generally regarded as exaggerations and often attributed to artificial lengthening of the two long feeding tentacles (analogous to stretching elastic bands) or to inadequate measurement methods such as pacing. Over time, various other superlative measurements have been attributed to the specimen, including a mass of 2 tonnes (2.2 short tons; 4,400 lb) or exactly 4,480 lb (2,030 kg); an eye diameter of 40 cm (16 in), 18 in (46 cm), or 9 in (23 cm); and suckers 4 in (10 cm) across. Additionally, a number of extreme mass estimates have been published for the specimen. (Note: Wildly excessive mass estimates for the "Thimble Tickle specimen" have included: 29.25 or 30 short tons (26.5 or 27.2 tonnes; 58,500 or 60,000 pounds); near 24 tonnes (26 short tons; 53,000 lb); less than 8 tonnes (8.8 short tons; 18,000 lb); and 2.8 or "more realistic[ally]" 2 tonnes (3.1 or 2.2 short tons; 6,200 or 4,400 lb).)

=== Giant Squid Interpretation Site ===
Today, a small heritage centre and a "life-sized", 55-foot giant squid sculpture—collectively known as the Giant Squid Interpretation Site—stand near the site of the specimen's capture and are the community's main tourist attractions. The sculpture was completed in 2001 following a CA$100,000 government contribution (equivalent to US$64,568 in 2025); ten thousand visitors were expected in the first year. It weighs four tonnes and was constructed from a combination of steel, wire mesh, and concrete. The sculpture was designed by fine arts teacher Don Foulds of Saskatoon (Note: Foulds was chosen because of his experience building large-scale community monuments in Saskatchewan, including "a giant turtle, a moose and a woolly mammoth".) and built by him and his students, with help from Jason Hussey, Niel McLellan, and Edward O'Neill. It has been described as "a beautiful reproduction" by Spanish giant squid experts. The sculpture featured on a Canada Post stamp issued in 2011 as part of the "Roadside Attractions" series, with a print run of 1,045,000.

The heritage centre opened in 2009 and includes a small museum, a gift shop, and a picnic area. The museum details the capture of the Thimble Tickle specimen—including among its collections the "official records of the encounter" and a "life-sized" replica of the squid's eyeball—but also the history of the local area and particularly its fishing heritage.

Thimble Tickle giant squid of 1878
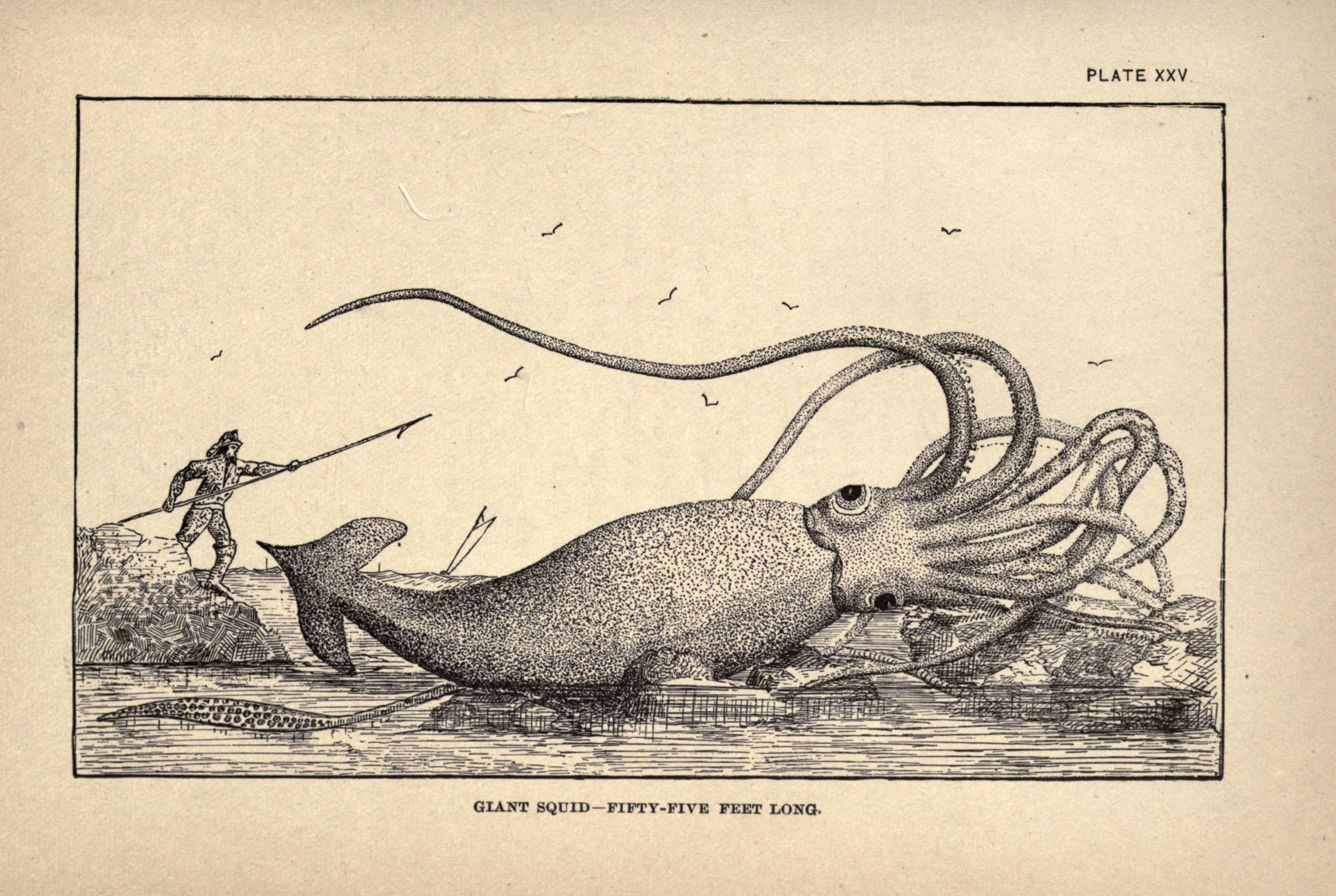
Artist's impression of the Thimble Tickle specimen, from Charles Holder's Marvels of Animal Life (1885)

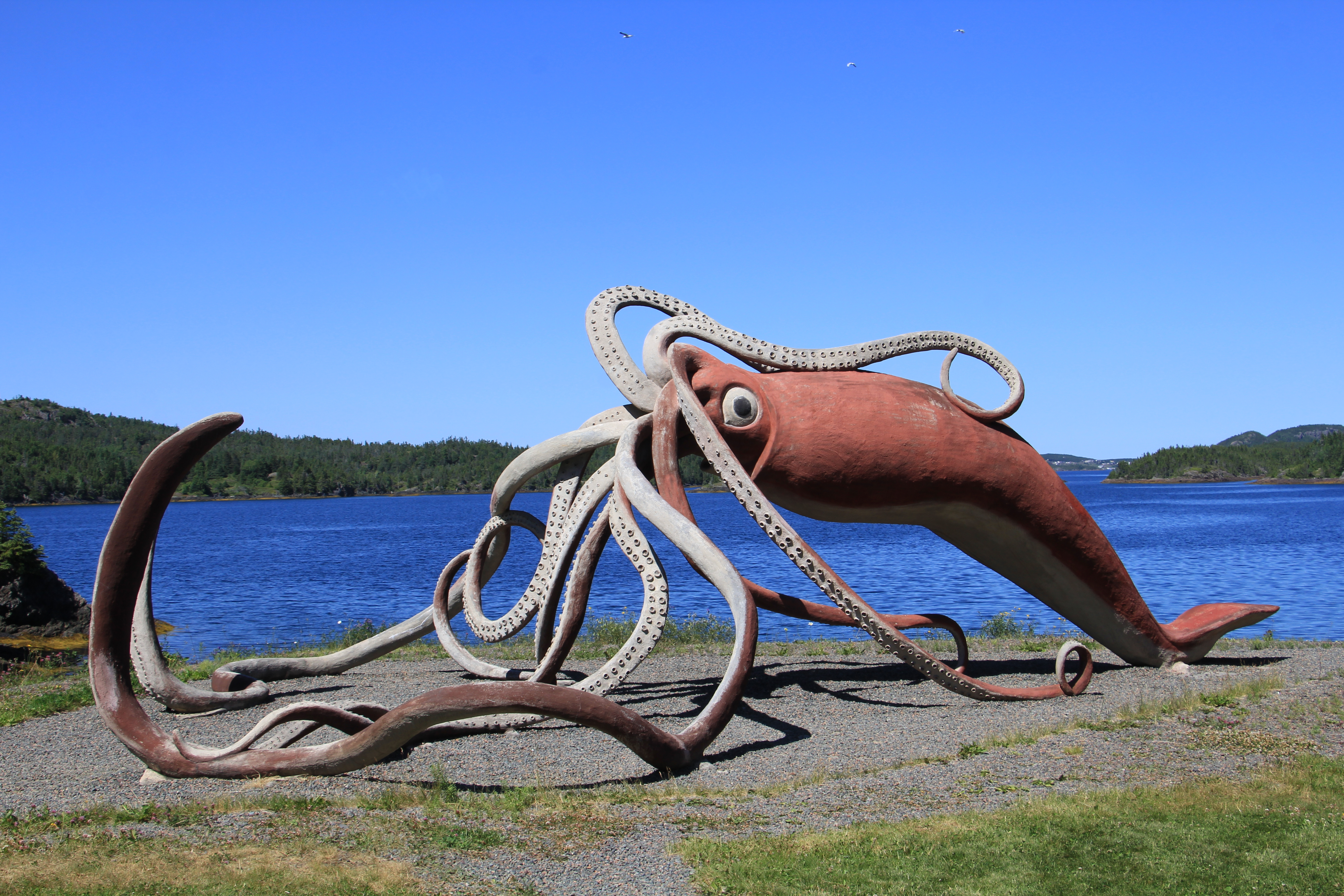
The "life-sized" concrete and metal sculpture of the Thimble Tickle giant squid, Glovers Harbour (July 2017)

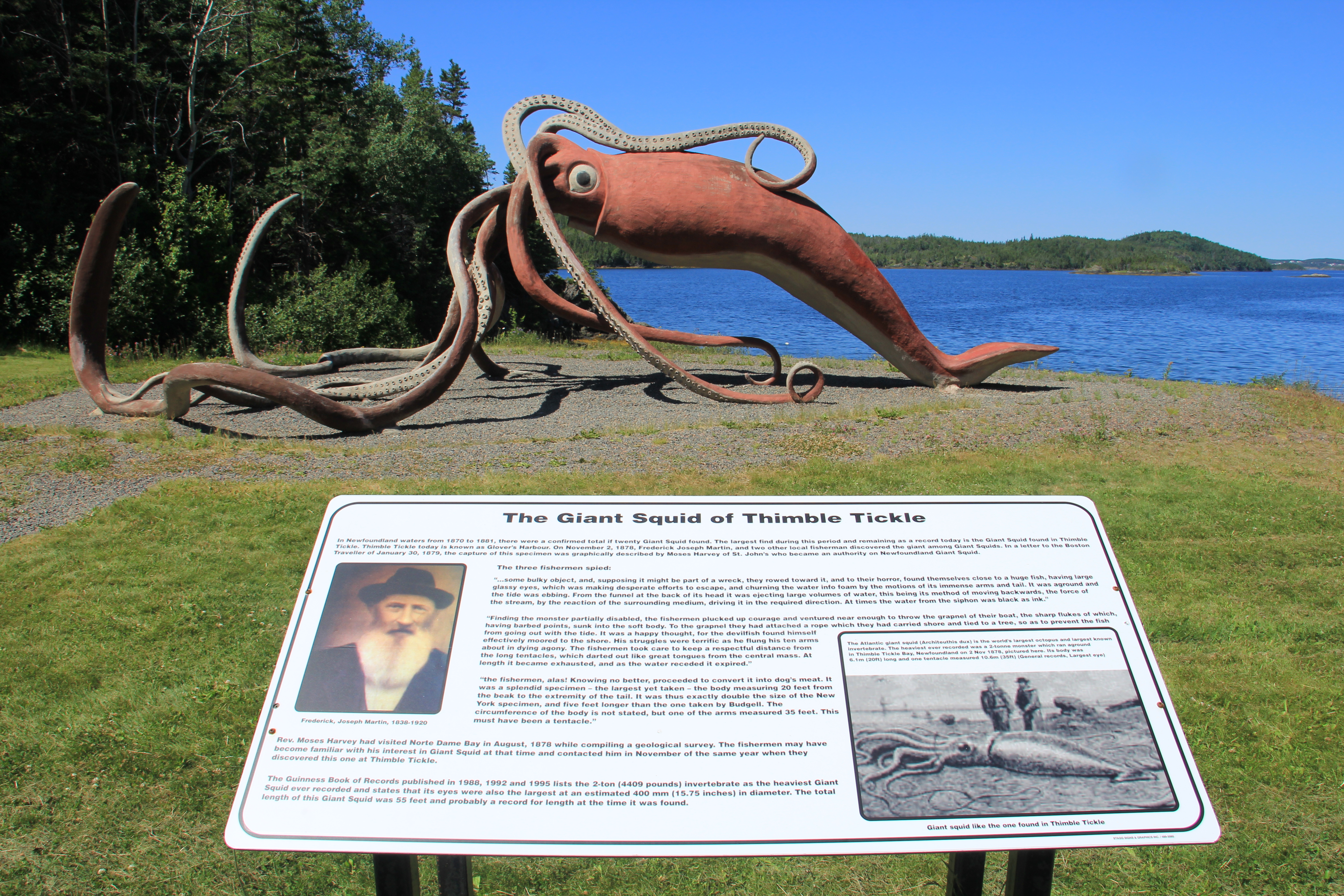
Sculpture with accompanying information plaque detailing the specimen's history and recognition by Guinness

== See also ==
- List of communities in Newfoundland and Labrador
- List of designated places in Newfoundland and Labrador
- List of local service districts in Newfoundland and Labrador
- Museo del Calamar Gigante – giant squid museum in Luarca, Spain
- Squid King – large squid statue in Noto, Japan
