= Museo del Calamar Gigante =

- Museum logo that adorned the façade of the original building (2010–2014)

- Location within Asturias Location within Spain
- Established: 13 August 2010 (reopened at new location on 15 July 2022)
- Location: Calle Nicanor del Campo, Luarca, Asturias, Spain (current location); Paseo del Muelle 25, Luarca, Asturias, Spain (original location)
- Coordinates: 43°32′27.5″N 6°32′19.5″W (current location); 43°32′52.4″N 6°32′2.4″W (original location)
- Type: Natural history museum
- Collections: Giant squid and other cephalopods, other marine life
- Visitors: almost 25,000 (2013) (Note: Another source from 2014 claims more than 26,000 annual visitors. A 2016 article in El Español gave a figure of around 20,000 for the number of regular visitors to the original museum during its entire existence between 2010 and 2014, not including some 50,000 children who participated in environmental education activities linked to the museum. For comparison, the population of Luarca at the time was around 6000.)
- Director: Luis Laria (2010–2014)
- Website: Official website

Museo del Calamar Gigante (Spanish pronunciation: [muˈseo ðel kalaˈmaɾ xiˈɣante]; lit. 'Giant Squid Museum') (Note: Also known as Centro del Calamar Gigante (Spanish pronunciation: [ˈθentɾo ðel kalaˈmaɾ xiˈɣante]; lit. 'Giant Squid Centre') and Centro de Interpretación del Calamar Gigante ([ˈθentɾo ðejnterpɾetaˈθjon del kalaˈmaɾ xiˈɣante]; lit. 'Giant Squid Interpretation Centre').) is a natural history museum located in Luarca, Asturias, Spain.

The original museum, opened in 2010, was administered by the marine conservation group CEPESMA (Note: Short for Coordinadora para el Estudio y la Protección de las Especies Marinas (lit. 'Coordinator for the Study and Protection of Marine Species').) and held the association's cephalopod collections together with other marine exhibits. It was described as the only museum in the world dedicated to the giant squid (Architeuthis dux) (Note: But see the small museum that forms part of the Giant Squid Interpretation Site in Glovers Harbour, Newfoundland, Canada, which opened a year earlier, in 2009.) and held one of the world's most important collections of large cephalopods, including the largest collection of giant squid on public display.

Opened in August 2010, the museum was badly damaged by a storm in November of the same year and largely destroyed by another storm in February 2014. As the museum had been a major tourist attraction and an important contributor to Luarca's economy, there was strong local support for its reconstruction or relocation. After several years without progress, two proposals for relocation—first to an adjacent warehouse and later to a former cinema—were put forward and then abandoned, before the local government settled on a plan to move the museum to a former nightclub. It reopened on 15 July 2022.

== Background ==
=== Giant squid in Asturias ===
From the latter half of the 20th century and continuing into the early 21st century, Asturias has been a global hotspot for giant squid specimens, contributing a significant fraction of all recorded individuals worldwide. Of the c. 650 specimens recorded globally as of 2012, 50 were documented in Asturian waters since 1956, or around one specimen per year. They are known locally as peludines owing to the typical "peeled" appearance of specimens that have partially lost their delicate reddish skin.

The animals received little attention from the scientific community in Asturias, and Spain more generally, until local naturalist Luis Laria drew attention to them, beginning in the mid-1990s. This marked the start of a long-term collaboration between Laria and cephalopod experts Ángel Guerra and Ángel F. González of CSIC's Instituto de Investigacións Mariñas in Vigo, Galicia, who had previously examined only giant squid specimens from Namibia and South Africa. The first joint dissection was carried out in Luarca in the winter of 1995, on an immature female from the Cantabrian coast weighing 104 kg (229 lb).

=== Work of CEPESMA ===
In 1996 Laria founded the environmental conservation organisation CEPESMA, with the aim of protecting marine ecosystems and promoting environmental education. It is through CEPESMA that much of the subsequent work on giant squid in the Asturian region was conducted. By July 2005, CEPESMA had handled 22 giant squid, and by 2009 this number had risen to around 30 collected specimens, of which they had preserved around 20; that year the group received their first specimen with intact eyes. By 2013, 27 giant squid specimens had been examined by the team. During this time they developed novel taxidermy methods to better preserve and display giant squid, which involved emptying the mantle of its internal organs and replacing them with a semi-rigid structure constructed from fishing nets, before submerging the whole specimen in a formaldehyde solution.

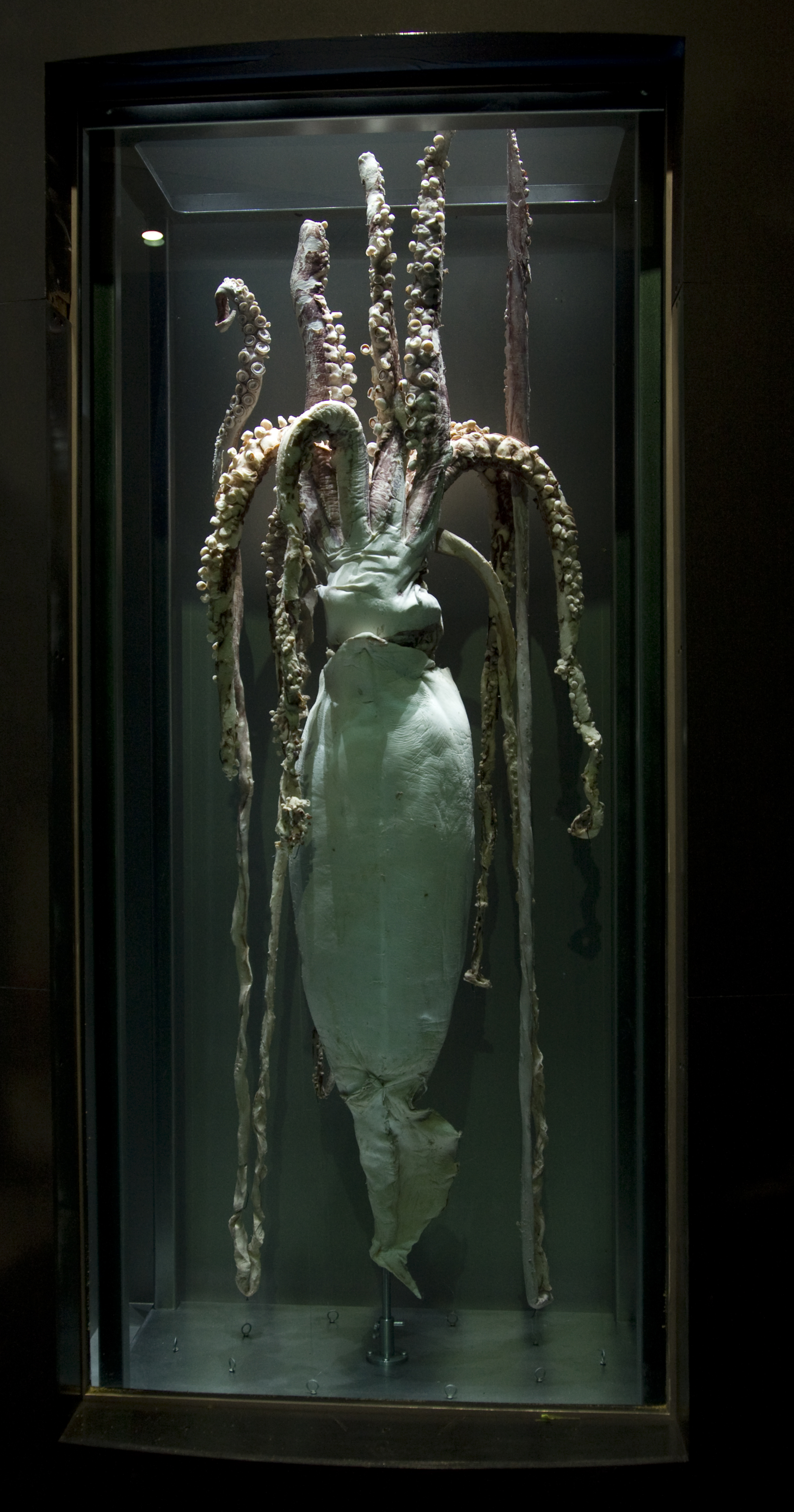
Giant squid on display at the National Museum of Natural History in Washington, D.C.—one of two specimens loaned to the museum by CEPESMA, and one of the few publicly exhibited males worldwide

Giant squid specimens from CEPESMA were loaned to a number of institutions around the world, including a male and a female to the National Museum of Natural History in Washington, D.C., United States (for €50,000; equivalent to US$73,540 in 2025), and another specimen to Biarritz Aquarium in Biarritz, France.

=== Local abundance ===
The frequency of records from the Carrandi fishing grounds off Asturias has been attributed to a confluence of factors, including the presence of three extensive submarine canyons near the coast; the local abundance of the giant squid's favoured prey, blue whiting (Micromesistius poutassou); the intensity of the fishing effort in the area; the tendency of local fishermen to report specimens; and the work of CEPESMA in recording and securing specimens. Geophysical prospecting employing air-gun arrays has also been implicated in several mass stranding events. The local abundance of specimens spurred an ultimately unsuccessful 2001–2002 effort to film the giant squid in its natural habitat for the first time, dubbed Proyecto Kraken ("Project Kraken"). On 7 October 2016, a live adult giant squid was photographed swimming off neighbouring Galicia, marking the first time this had been achieved outside of Japanese waters.

== History ==
=== Early giant squid exhibits ===
The giant squid collection that would form the core of Museo del Calamar Gigante began with the arrival of the first specimen in Luarca in 1997. The embryonic collection was originally exhibited at the Padre Galo public school (Colegio Público Padre Galo) in the centre of Luarca from early 1998. In November 2002, the growing collection was transferred, with financial help from the Principality of Asturias, to Luarca's Villar youth hostel, where 600 square metres (6,500 sq ft) was made available. It remained there until forced to close on 7 January 2008 due to the poor state of the building and its supposedly imminent demolition. It was subsequently moved to a 160-square-metre (1,700 sq ft) warehouse of Luarca station, loaned by national railway operator FEVE. The giant squid collection was to be publicly displayed there until the construction of the new museum in Luarca port, but these plans were scuppered by humidity problems in the warehouse. In the end, only the 16 schools that had previously arranged visits were shown the collection at this temporary venue. Luis Laria stated that the warehouse "does not meet the minimum conditions [...] it would not be dignified to charge entrance to a visitor on whom the paintwork will fall" ("no cumple las mínimas condiciones [...] no sería digno cobrar la entrada a un visitante al que se le caerá la pintura encima"). Laria also criticised the forced move from Villar youth hostel, which at that point (May 2008) was still standing.

Throughout this time the giant squid collection formed part of a wider exhibit known as Aula del Mar ("Classroom of the Sea"), which also encompassed items related to climate change, cetaceans, turtles, crustaceans, and molluscs. It received around 4000 school children per year. Of the total collection, which occupied some 1,200 square metres (13,000 sq ft), around 30% would go on to be exhibited at Museo del Calamar Gigante.

=== Planning for a new museum ===
In 2005 the Principality of Asturias committed €300,500 (equivalent to US$373,852 in 2025) towards the relocation of Aula del Mar. As a major local tourist attraction, Valdés mayor Juan Fernández Pereiro advocated for the new exhibition to be located in the centre of Luarca where it would receive more visitors. The first proposal called for part of the fishermen's warehouses (formerly a cannery) at the end of Luarca dock to be set aside for the exhibition, but this was rejected by the owners, and a proposal to construct the museum as an annex to the existing warehouses was taken forward instead.

Detailed plans for Museo del Calamar Gigante were released in May 2007, with works set to start in July. At the time, Vicente Álvarez Areces, the President of the Principality of Asturias, said that the museum would be "an international reference center for the exhibition and dissemination of cephalopods" ("un centro de referencia internacional de exposición y divulgación de cefalópodos"). At its new location it was expected to double the 30,000 visitors to Aula del Mar in 2006. In October 2007 Areces announced that Museo del Calamar Gigante would open in 2009. Work would involve stabilising the slope adjacent to the museum site.

CEPESMA specimens exhibited in Luarca in September 2009, prior to the opening of Museo del Calamar Gigante

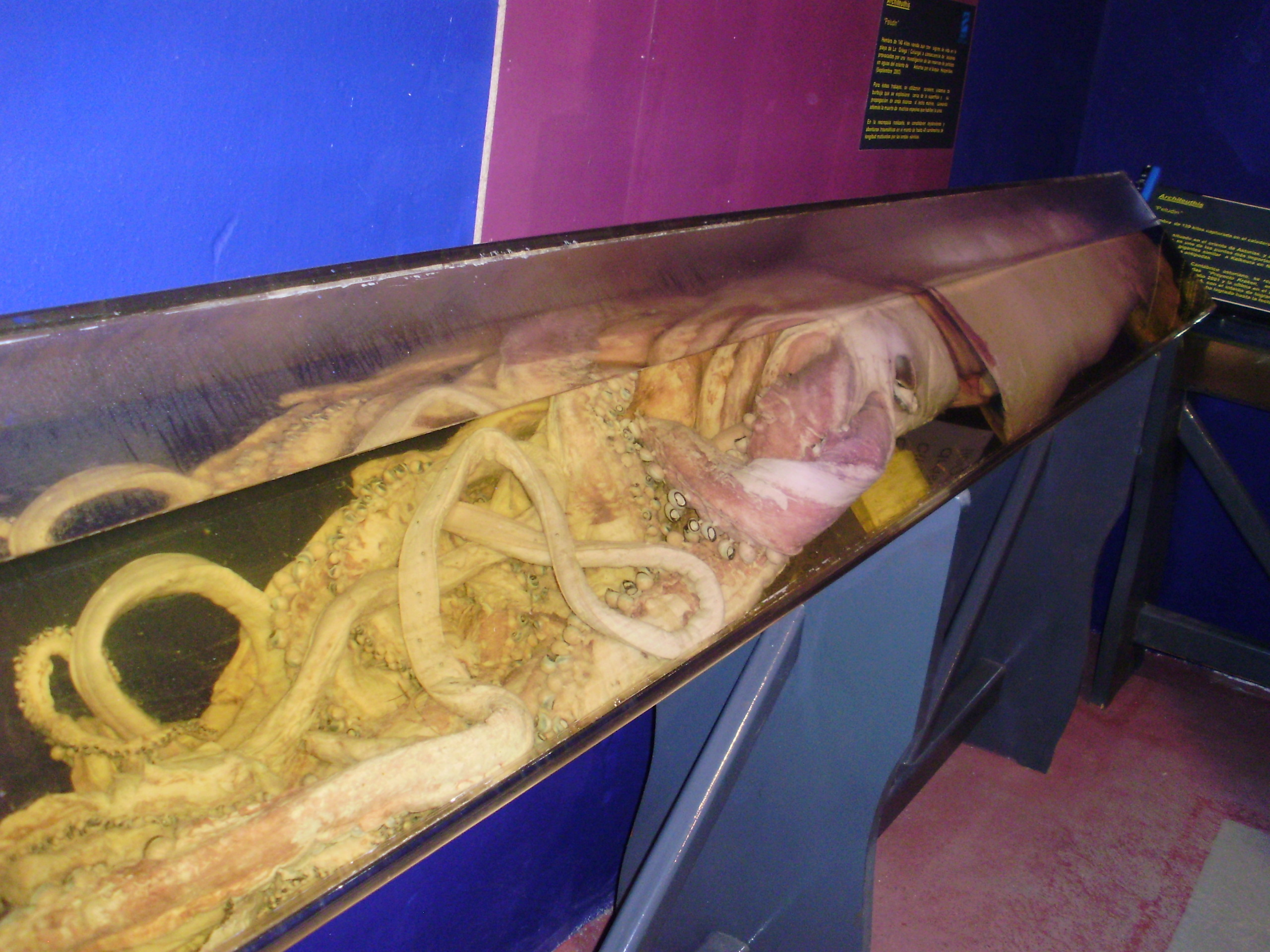
Giant squid
(Architeuthis dux)

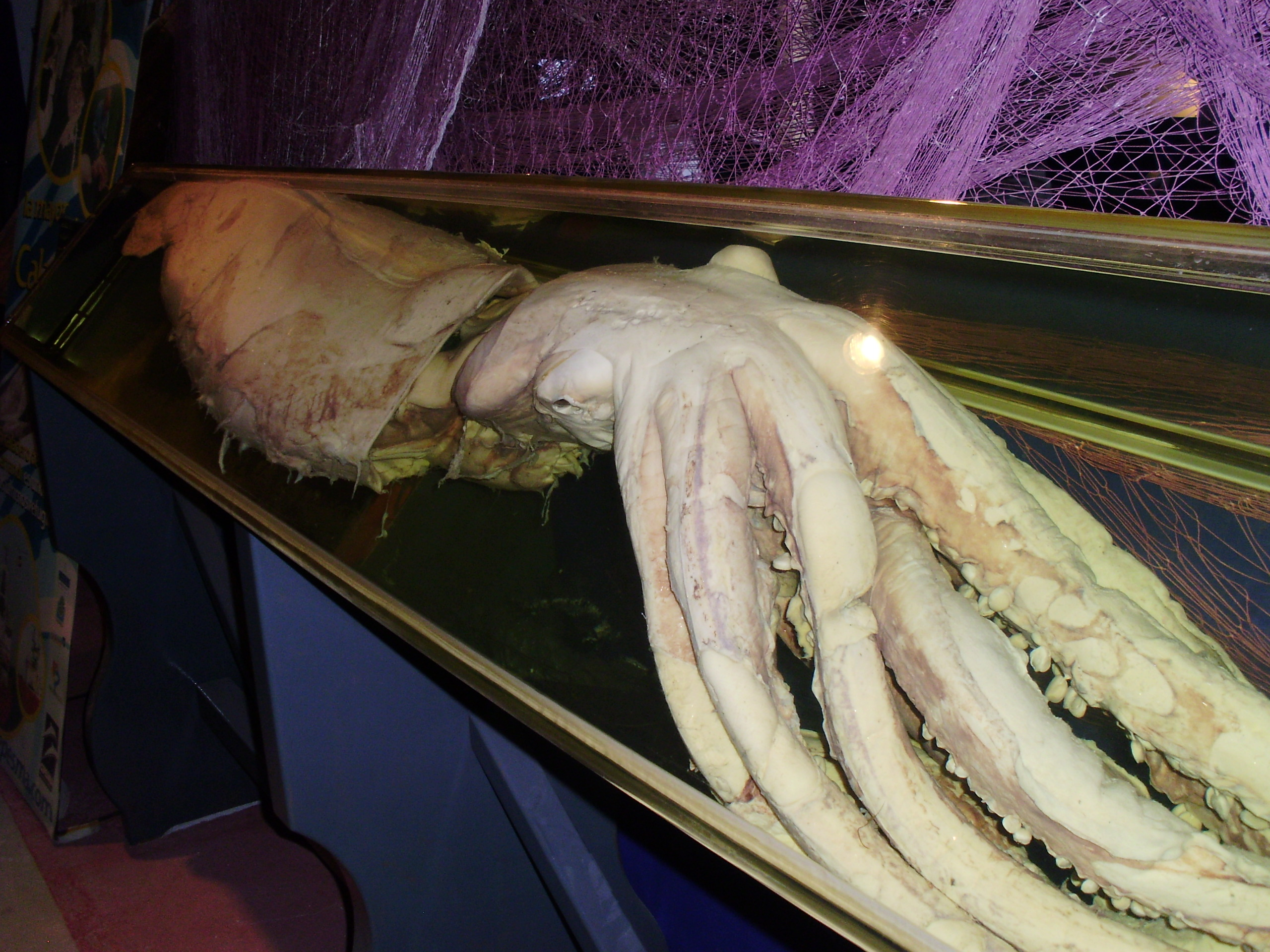
Giant squid
(Architeuthis dux)

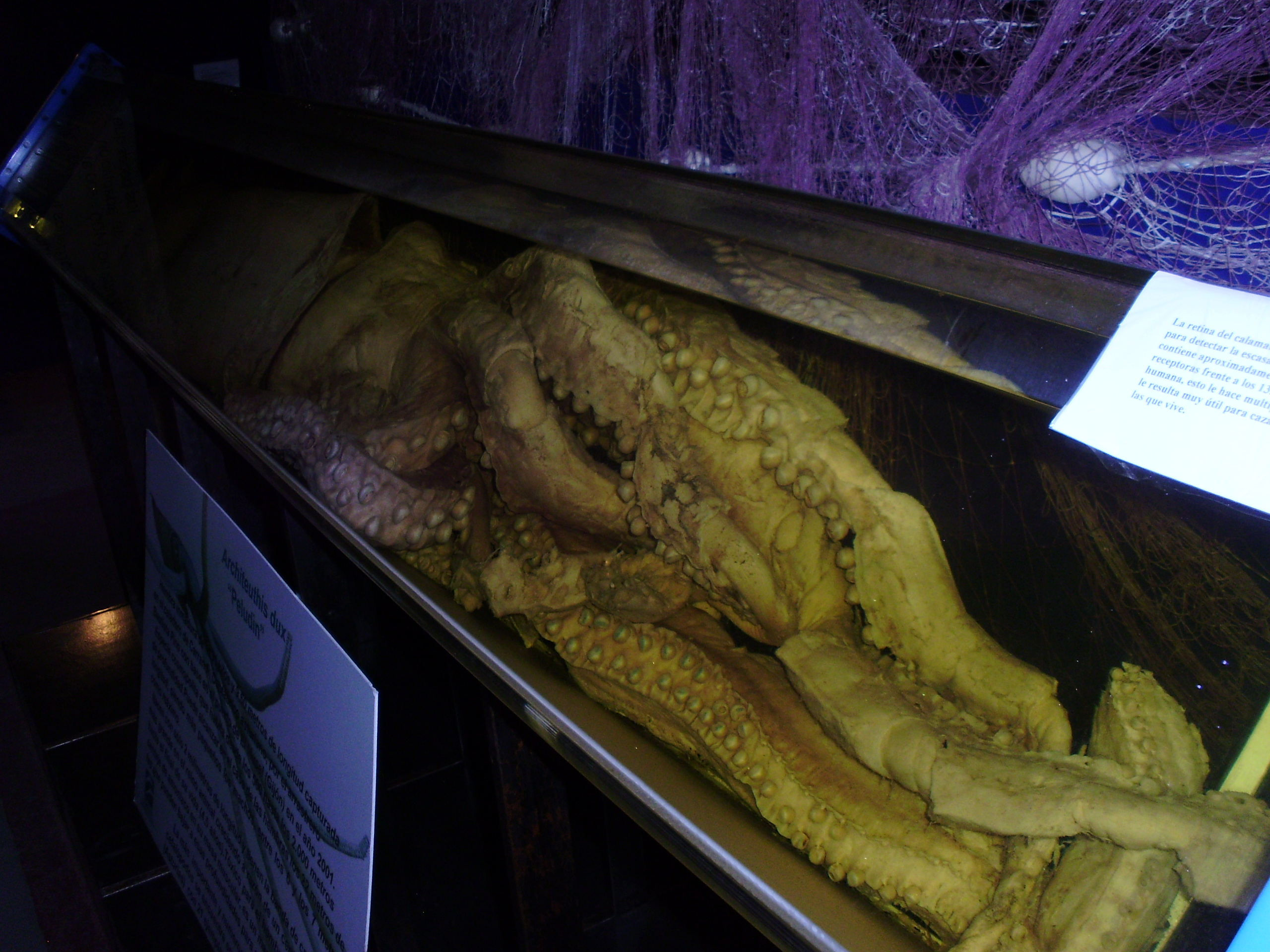
Giant squid
(Architeuthis dux)

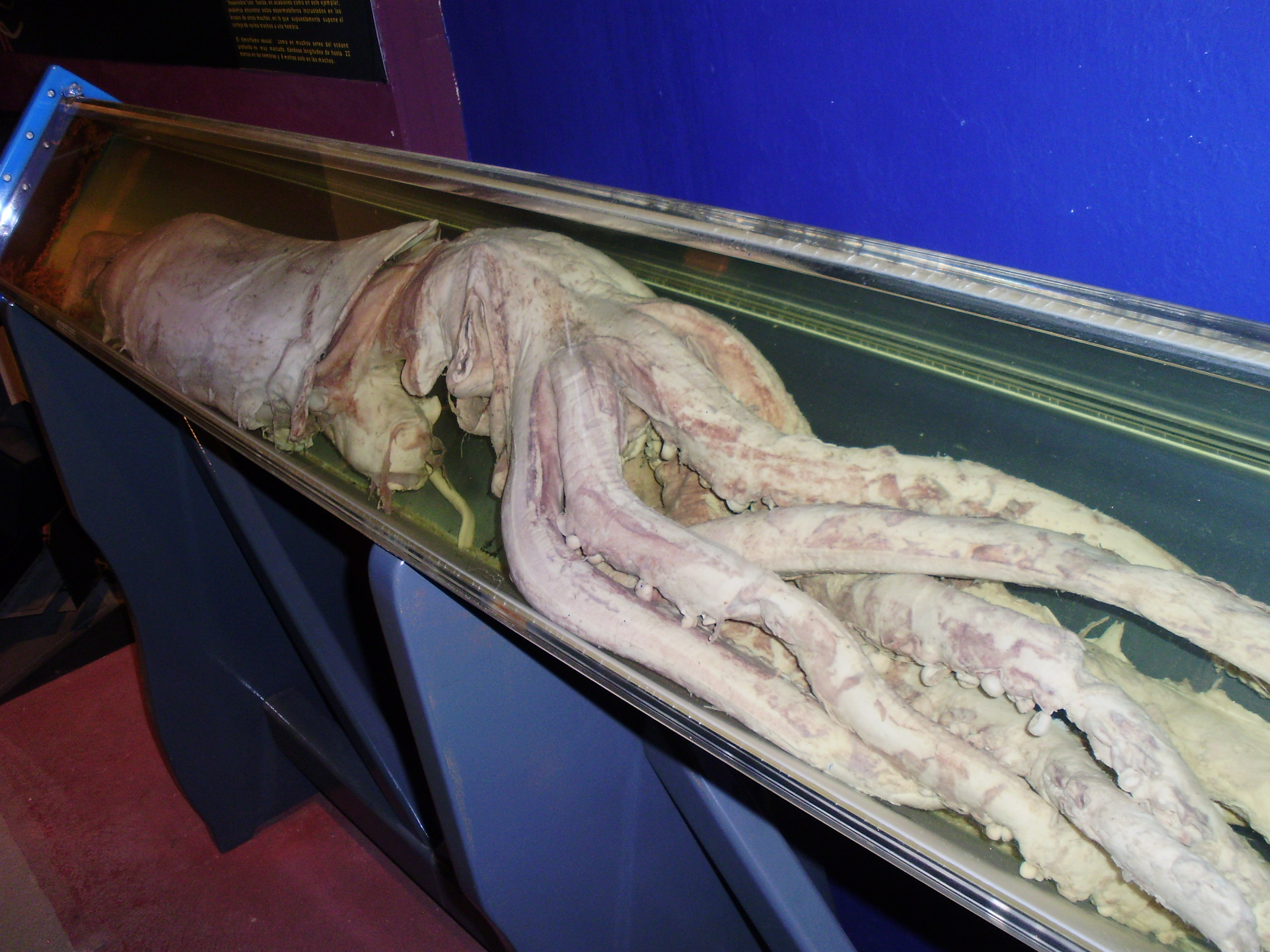
Giant squid
(Architeuthis dux)

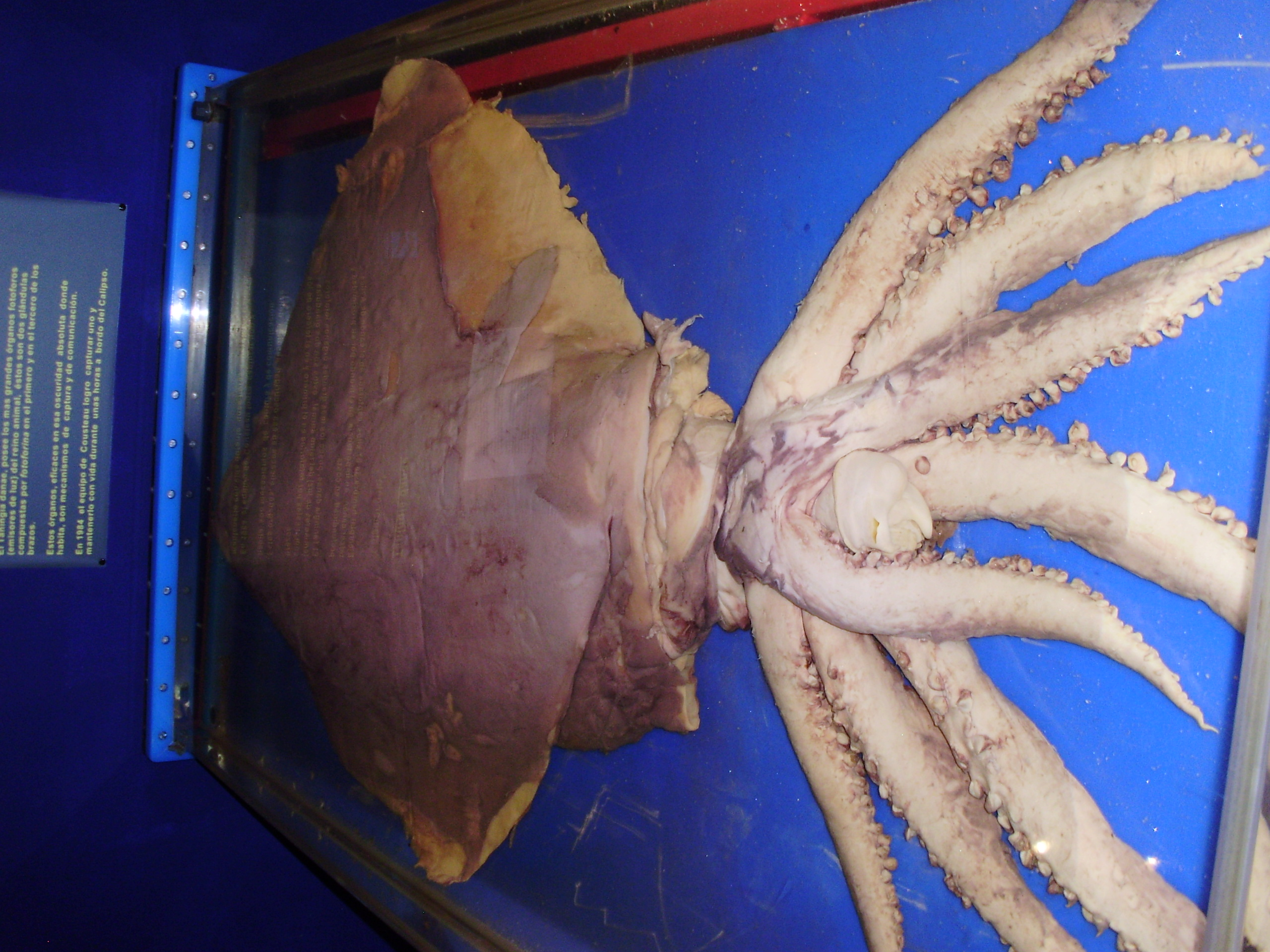
Dana octopus squid
(Taningia danae)

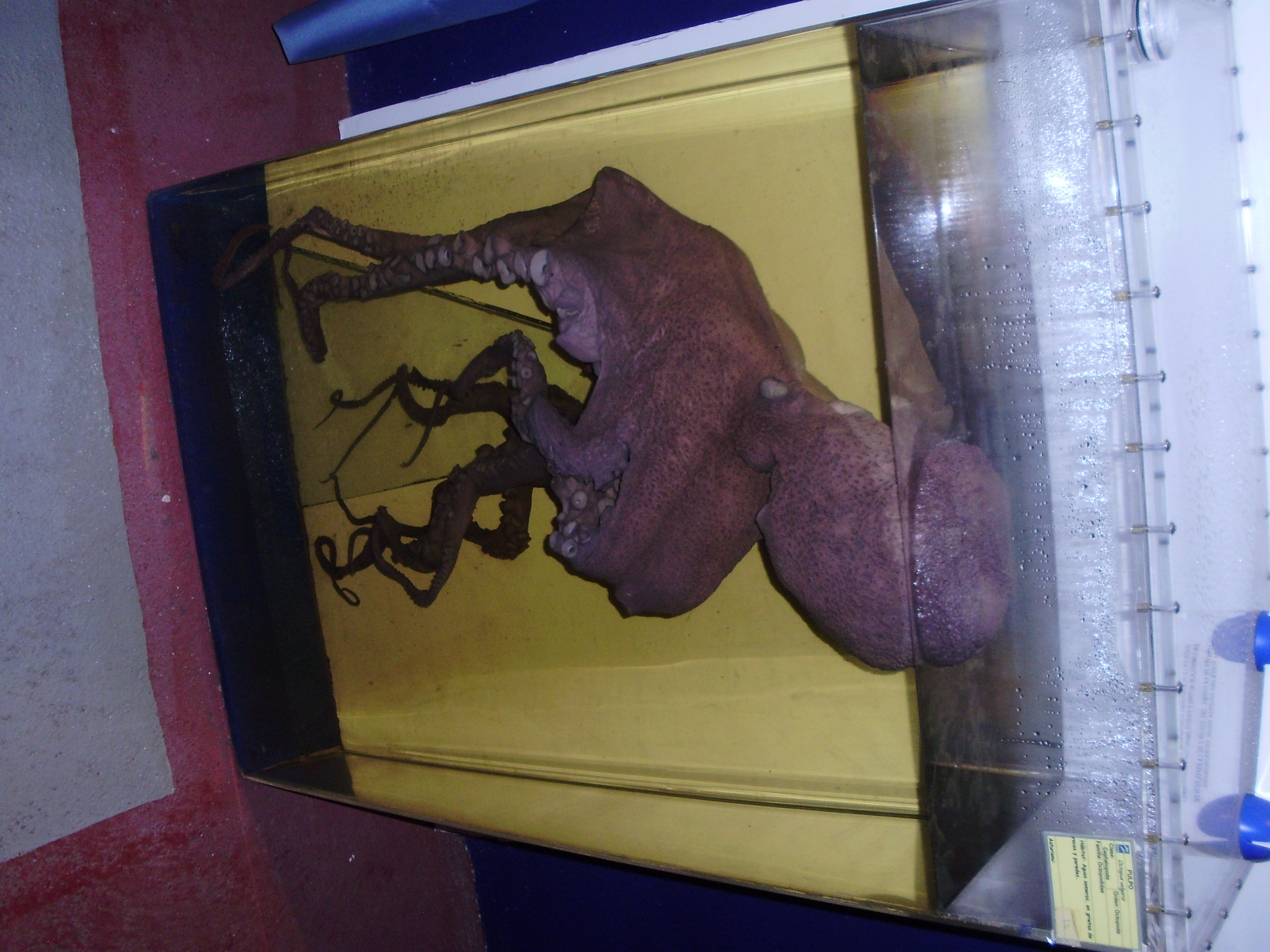
Common octopus
(Octopus vulgaris)

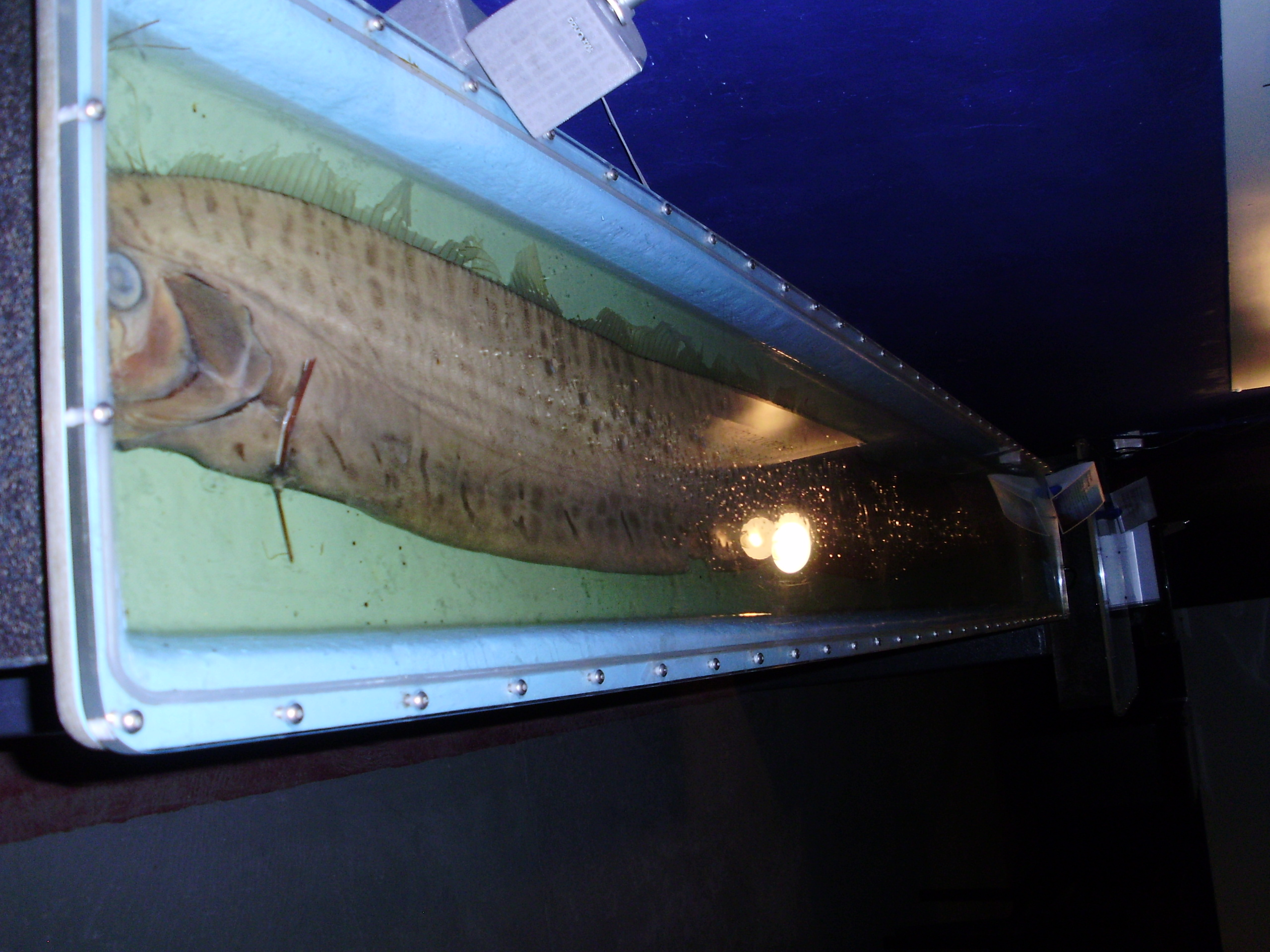
Oarfish
(Regalecus sp.)

=== Opening and facilities ===
After some delays, the museum opened its doors to the public on 13 August 2010, with an official inauguration taking place in September. It was visited by 14,000 people in the first three months.

The museum building, which had 908.75 square metres (9,781.7 sq ft) of floorspace and a 66.25-square-metre (713.1 sq ft) patio, was built at a cost of €1,260,000 (equivalent to US$1,670,382 in 2025), financed by the Principality of Asturias. The Asturian government contributed an additional €315,000 (equivalent to US$417,596 in 2025) through the Tourism Product Revitalisation Plan for Comarca Vaqueira (Plan de Dinamización Producto Turístico "Comarca Vaqueira"). The exterior was clad in grey quartzite at ground level and aluminium composite on the upper two floors. The rear of the building was attached to existing fishermen's warehouses. The building's location, at the end of Luarca port, left it highly exposed to the elements, and it had already suffered storm damage during its construction when a partition wall was washed away. Both construction and subsequent repairs were undertaken by the construction company Sardesa Española.

The collections were spread across three floors and included eleven giant squid (Architeuthis dux) specimens and three of Taningia danae, the Dana octopus squid, including a giant female weighing 124 kg (273 lb). The squid collection alone was valued at €2 million (equivalent to US$2,657,000 in 2025), with the individual giant squid specimens worth approximately €150,000 each (equivalent to US$199,275 in 2025). The specimens were preserved in an alcohol-based solution that CEPESMA had determined to be particularly conducive to long-term display with minimal deterioration.

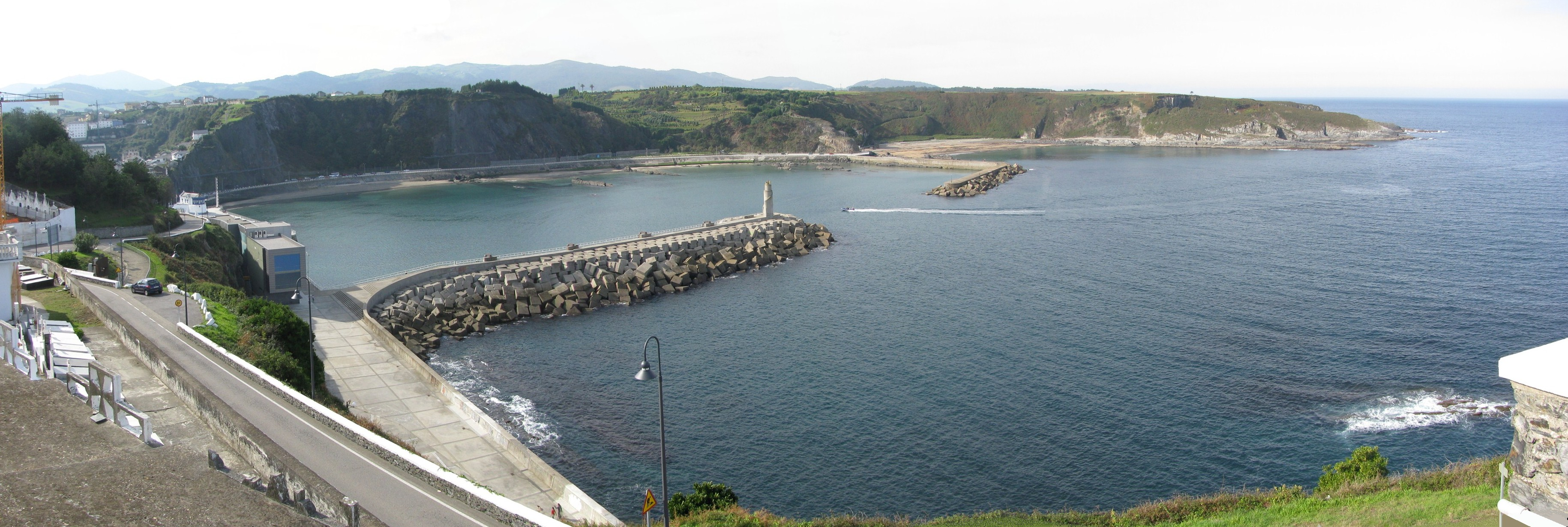
Panoramic view of Luarca harbour, October 2010, showing the original (still undamaged) museum building in the centre-left of the frame, facing the breakwater

=== November 2010 storm damage and reopening ===
A storm in November 2010 forced the museum's temporary closure after it sustained damage amounting to more than €140,000 (equivalent to US$185,598 in 2025). The problem was compounded by CEPESMA's financial situation at the time, with the association unable to fund its activities and having to lay off staff. Plans were drawn up for a concrete wall that would protect the museum from future wave damage at a cost of €573,000 (equivalent to US$797,616 in 2025). CEPESMA eventually had to take out a €35,000 (equivalent to US$48,720 in 2025) loan to repair the damage. The museum reopened on 21 April 2011 after a little over two weeks of repair work to the ground floor and access area. The museum received 1,670 visitors in its first four days after reopening.

The number of visitors rose 17% between 2012 and 2013, which was largely attributed to increased media exposure for CEPESMA. The museum occasionally hosted special events, such as the first conference on cephalopod science and gastronomy in September 2012 and a three-day conference on cetaceans in February 2013.

=== February 2014 destruction ===
"The storms did damage, but the most serious was the political one, the damage of unreason, apathy, and thoughtlessness. In the short time it was open, it was twice damaged from the sea and then twice more, [the latter] perhaps more painful. Just 15 days [sic] after the second storm, a group of vandals created more than 20,000 euros in damages, with fire extinguishers, they threw everything, they entered to vandalise. That was the most important damage on a moral level and then the political one, due to inaction and disregard, because they also threw out two million euros, which was what the museum cost." (Note: Original Spanish quotation: "Los temporales hicieron un daño, pero el más grave fue el político, el daño de la sinrazón, la apatía, la desconsideración. Del poco tiempo que estuvo abierto tuvo dos daños por el mar y después otros dos más, quizás más dolorosos. Justo a los 15 días del segundo temporal, un grupo de vándalos creó más de 20.000 euros en daños, con extintores, todo lo tiraron, entraron de forma vandálica. Ese fue el daño más importante a nivel moral y luego el político, por la inacción y la desconsideración, porque tiraban también dos millones de euros, que fue lo que costó el museo.")

— Luis Laria, museum founder, from an October 2020 interview with La Voz de Galicia

On 2 February 2014 the museum was hit by a devastating storm that washed away the building's partition walls, doors, and any loose items inside, including specimens, chairs, and a collection of exhibited paintings. The lower two of its three floors were directly affected and the lighting system destroyed. Museo del Calamar Gigante once held the world's largest collection of giant squid, but many of the museum's specimens were destroyed during the storm. (Note: Sources differ as to the number of giant squid specimens held by the museum prior to its destruction, with numbers ranging from 14 to as many as 31. The number lost in the storm of February 2014 has been variously reported as 4 or 11. The museum's official website mentioned 9 "large" giant squid specimens. According to an extended report in La Nueva España, losses resulting from the events of February 2014 included four giant squid (including the longest specimen, measuring 13.7 m (45 ft)), a 2.5-metre (8.2 ft) mako shark weighing 100 kg (220 lb), and various abyssal species and other cephalopods, with a total value of almost €700,000 (equivalent to US$929,950 in 2025).) Some were swept out to sea while others could not be saved because their damaged tanks had lost their preservative fluid. One of the specimens that survived was a giant squid caught off Gandia in July 2005 – the first male recorded from the Mediterranean Sea.

The destruction of the museum was blamed on the poor quality of the original construction and subsequent repairs, which were described as "a botch" ("una chapuza"), with walls far too thin to withstand the force of the waves and strong winds that might be expected in such an exposed location. The placement of the electrical panel at ground level was also singled out as "a huge risk" ("un riesgo enorme"), as was the choice of large glass panels facing out to sea. A cannery that was later modified into the fishermen's warehouses that attach to the rear of the museum building was similarly exposed for many years yet never suffered serious damage. Museum director Luis Laria asserted that "if it were made of concrete there would not have been the slightest problem" ("si fuese de hormigón no habría habido ni el más mínimo problema").

A few days after the storm, the museum was broken into at night and vandalised. The vandals gained entry by breaking locks and doors. Tanks were smashed with fire extinguishers, exhibits and furniture destroyed, televisions and a DVD player stolen, and obscenities scrawled across the walls. The extensive damage to the specimen tanks, some of which cost around €5000–6000 (equivalent to US$6,643–7,971 in 2025) each, forced the relocation of the surviving specimens. Luis Laria saw this act of vandalism as "the straw that breaks the camel's back" ("la gota que colma el vaso"). Thereafter, the museum remained closed until further notice. An online petition was soon started with the aim of either rebuilding the museum at its original location with an improved design or else relocating it. Accounts for collecting donations were opened by St. Timothy's Brotherhood (Cofradía de San Timoteo) in Luarca and CEPESMA volunteers in Gijón.

=== Abandonment of site ===
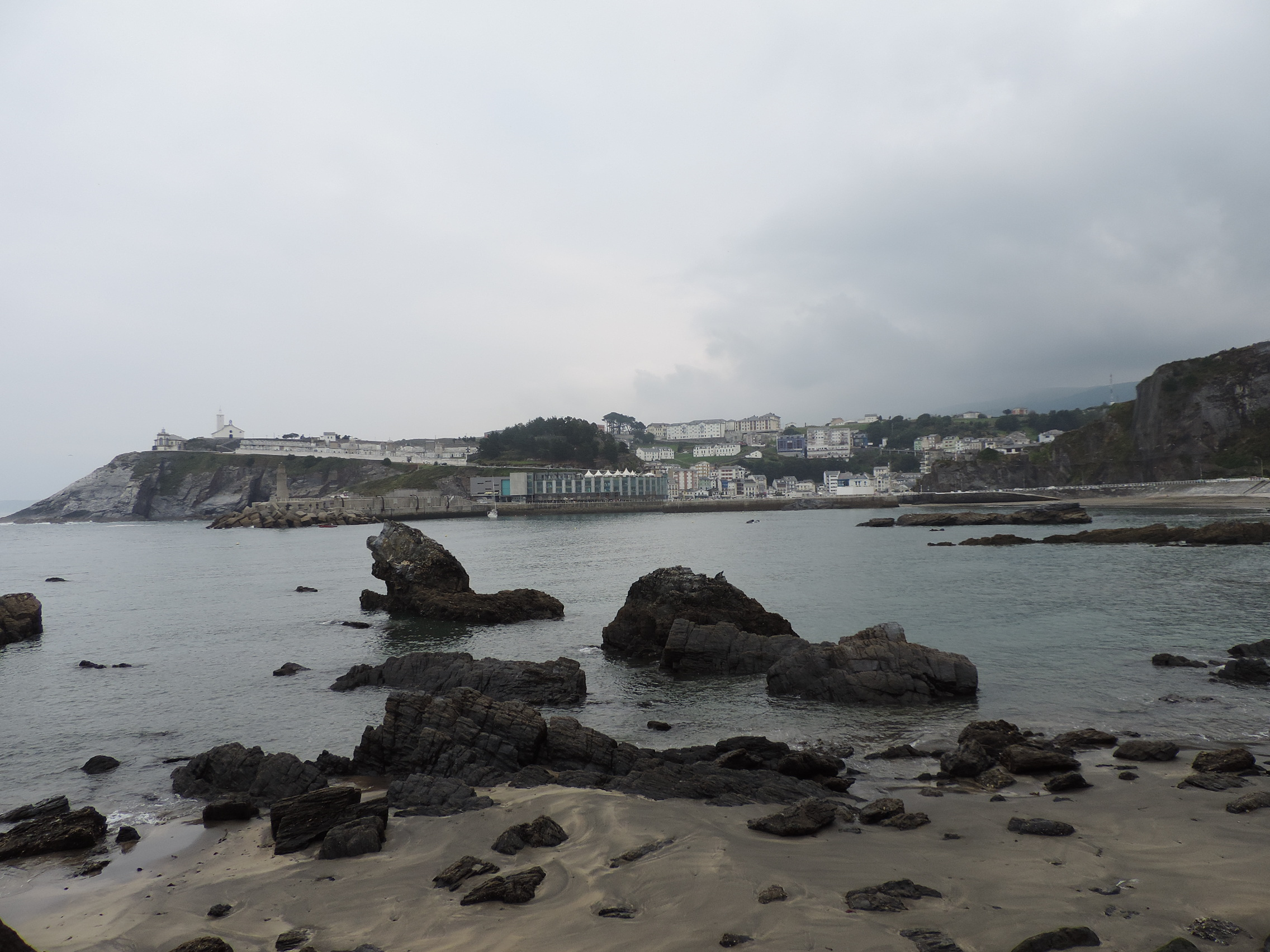
View from the opposite side of Luarca harbour, showing the damaged museum building and adjacent fishermen's premises, September 2014

In early 2015, more than a year after its destruction, the museum was described as having been abandoned, with the building left unprotected and its interior still filled with rubble. It was said to have suffered further damage from subsequent winter storms and vandalism. However, Valdés mayor Simón Guardado insisted that protective fences had been installed and that the site was checked periodically. Guardado also announced that options would be explored to build a screen that would protect the facility against further storm damage. The Principality of Asturias was said to be working on a project that would be put out to tender in the next legislature, though no firm deadlines were given. Prior to regional and municipal elections in May 2015, a meeting between the regional government and Valdés municipal council (to which Luarca belongs) was held to discuss the museum's future, but as of February 2016 no decision had been made owing to budgetary constraints.

On 31 May 2016, Valdés mayor Simón Guardado held a meeting with the Minister of Infrastructure, Belén Fernández, in which it was agreed that a temporary home would be found for the giant squid collection, with a commitment to eventually recover the original museum building. This would involve rebuilding the museum and reinforcing the adjacent pier, with an aim to put the project out to tender between late 2016 and early 2017. A demonstration in support of rebuilding Museo del Calamar Gigante was held in front of the abandoned structure in Luarca port on 4 June 2016. However, Luis Laria stated that no progress had been made following a meeting with Simón Guardado later that month.

On 4 February 2017, almost exactly three years after its destruction, another demonstration calling for the museum's reopening was organised. On the same day, the Principality of Asturias announced that it would commit €60,000 (equivalent to US$67,782 in 2025) towards cleaning up the museum building in time for Easter. Additionally, the Ministry of Development was to initiate a €200,000 (equivalent to US$225,940 in 2025) study into local sea dynamics to determine whether the site was viable for such a museum. It was said the study could be completed by the end of the year.

In February 2022, a pair of French urban explorers uploaded videos of their unauthorised exploration of the derelict museum building. The videos, which showed decaying exhibits (including the life-sized foam giant squid that once greeted visitors) and the damage caused by successive storms and vandalism, sparked considerable online interest.

A giant mural of Luarca-born Nobel Prize–winning scientist Severo Ochoa was unveiled on the building's western façade in May 2022. Measuring 16 by 10 metres, it was a collaboration between Valdés municipal council and the Art for Dent association and formed part of a project aimed at raising awareness of Dent's disease.

=== Storage and eventual donation of specimens ===
Following the museum's destruction in 2014, the surviving giant squid specimens were moved to CEPESMA's Parque de la Vida, which had opened in 2007 in La Mata, on the outskirts of Luarca; some were placed on public display as part of a 600-square-metre (6,500 sq ft) exhibit that also included items related to biology, geology, and astronomy. CEPESMA president Luis Laria put €23,000 (equivalent to US$25,459 in 2025) of his own money into keeping three specimens at the park. He received numerous offers to buy the surviving giant squid specimens, with interest from scientific institutions, city councils, banks, and even public figures. Laria said he had turned them down as he wanted the specimens to remain in Valdés and was otherwise only willing to loan the specimens for a few years, which most potential buyers would not consider.

In late 2017, Luis Laria donated the remaining museum collections, including 11 giant squid (of which four had been acquired since the museum's destruction, as new specimens and returns from Biarritz Aquarium in France), to Valdés municipal council and stated that CEPESMA would not be involved in the management of the new museum; it was unclear which body would take over. In March 2021, donated items including paintings, sculptures, books and various other objects were sold at the Caja Rural exhibition hall in Gijón to finance the recovery of CEPESMA's facilities, including those still holding the remaining giant squid specimens in anticipation of the museum's planned reopening later that year. The giant squid collection at Parque de la Vida featured in an episode of the La 2 television program Rutas bizarras ("Bizarre routes") first broadcast on 13 April 2021.

=== Initial relocation plans ===
In July 2018, plans were unveiled for the museum to reopen in the premises of the local Fishermen's Guild (Cofradía de Pescadores), just to the rear of the original museum building, with a tentative completion date of summer 2020. The new museum was to have 850 square metres of floorspace, with the project's budget exceeding €650,000 (equivalent to US$767,650 in 2025) and €45,000 (US$53,145 in 2025) allocated for its tender; the bidding process was to commence in August. As part of the plan, the fishermen's quarters would be relocated to the Almuña-Barcia industrial estate. Preliminary plans to relocate the museum to the fishermen's warehouses had already been in place in 2017, when Luis Laria donated his remaining giant squid specimens to Valdés municipal council.

Following prolonged inaction on the part of the local government, a group of around 250 people gathered in Luarca on 2 February 2019 to demand the construction of a new museum. Luis Laria stated at the time: "the giant squid represent my past" ("los calamares gigantes representan mi pasado").

In December 2019, it was announced that the museum would instead be relocated to a building that previously housed Luarca's Goya Cinema (Cine Goya), at a cost of approximately €900,000 (equivalent to US$1,007,550 in 2025). This move, which had been under consideration since at least July 2019, was seen as far more economical, as it was estimated that the original plan—which called for the Fishermen's Guild to be converted into the new museum, new premises provided for the fishermen, and the former cinema separately converted into an auditorium—would have cost almost €3 million (equivalent to US$3,358,500 in 2025). An opening in June 2020 was planned. The new location was criticised for lacking sufficient parking space and being far from the sea, and because the space was previously intended for a cultural centre and an auditorium for the local council. After further delays and inaction, in February 2020 the association Más Luarca Valdés called for "a dignified, solid and definitive solution" ("una solución digna, sólida y definitiva") to the question of the museum's future.

=== Relocation to former nightclub ===
"I don't want to know anything about what was in the museum because for me that museum has been a cursed museum. I'm going to put it like this. I dedicated my whole life and my best efforts so that afterwards it would come to nothing and the political organisation would deny the value of this facility." (Note: Original Spanish quotation: "No quiero saber nada de lo que había en el museo porque para mí ese museo ha sido un museo maldito. Voy a decirlo así. Dediqué toda mi vida y mis máximos esfuerzos para que después se quedase en nada y que el organigrama político ningunease el valor de este equipamiento.")

— Luis Laria, museum founder, from an October 2020 interview with La Voz de Galicia

A third relocation proposal was put forward in September 2020, this time to Luarca's old Villa Blanca nightclub. Work to adapt the nightclub—budgeted at €45,000 (equivalent to US$51,399 in 2025)—was to begin in January 2021 and be completed by March, followed by the construction of museum exhibits, for which an additional €48,000 (equivalent to US$54,826 in 2025) was allocated. The opening date was set for 1 July 2021, with the government paying monthly rent of €1500 (equivalent to US$1,713 in 2025) plus VAT thereafter. The new museum was planned to be a "sensory experience" making use of light and sound effects. Tanks containing twelve cephalopod specimens were to be held in a municipal warehouse until work on the new museum was completed; transferred in January 2020, they remained there as of late 2021. Other marine animals were also planned to be exhibited, some of which had survived in their original preservative fluid inside the old museum building for the seven years since its destruction.

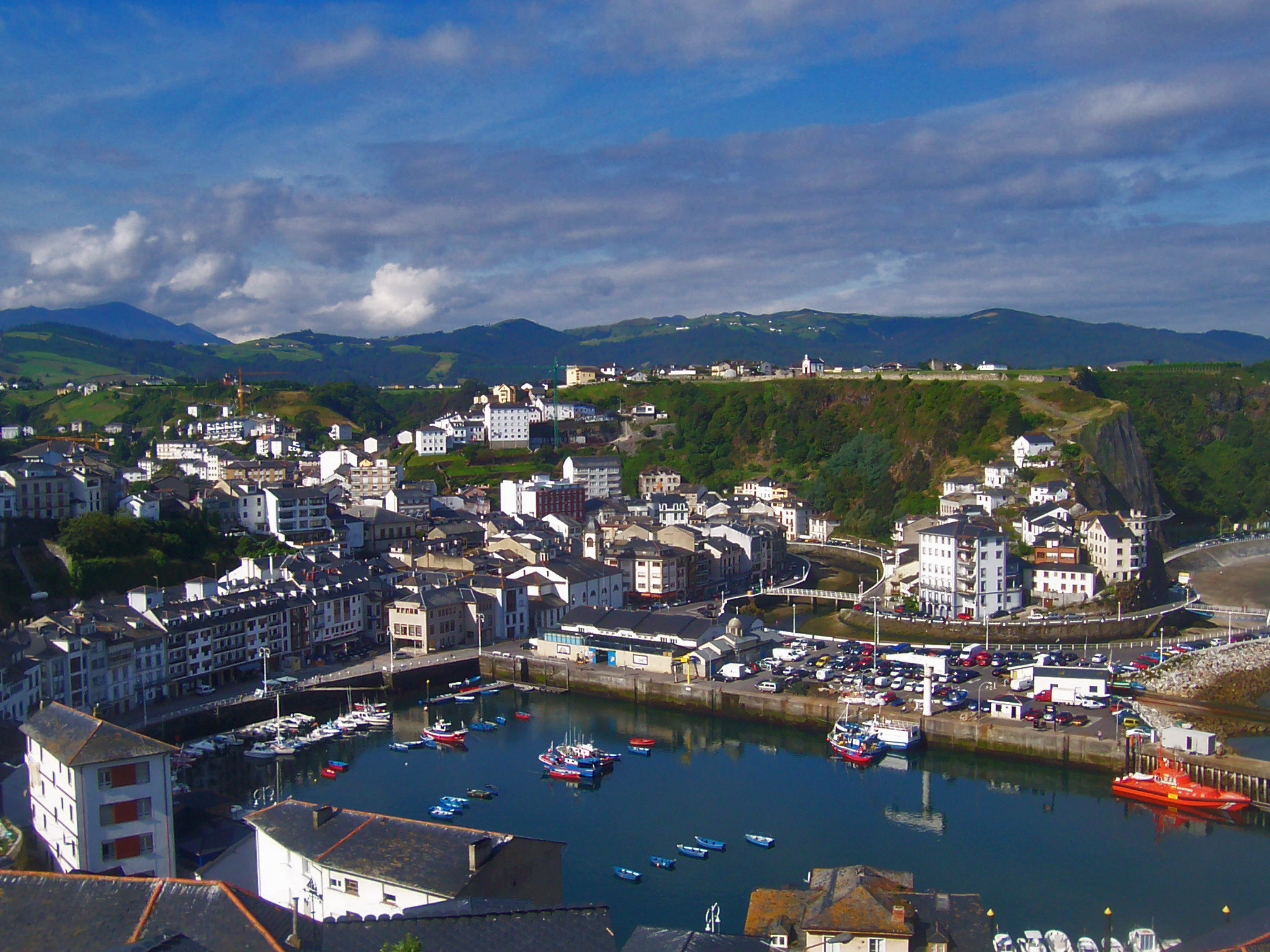
Luarca port and urban core area, 2009

The choice of the former nightclub met with strong local opposition from the commerce and hospitality sectors. The venue was criticised by People's Party regional deputy Álvaro Queipo as being too small for its intended purpose, at only 290 square metres (3,100 sq ft), and far from the port; Queipo commented that it "is not at the level of what this museum deserves, which has been an international jewel" ("no está a la altura de lo que se merece este museo, que ha sido una joya de ámbito internacional"). In March 2021, Valdés mayor Óscar Pérez stated that the giant squid museum was central to his strategy for revitalising the municipality's tourism industry. Pérez opined that the size of the former nightclub was sufficient to meet the museum's requirements, adding: "Being in the urban core area, it will make potential customers pass in front of various businesses such as shops, restaurants… and, therefore, it will favor economic activity. The reopening of the museum will help to structure the interior of Luarca, which never had significant resources for a flow of people." (Note: Original Spanish quotation: "Al estar en la zona del núcleo urbano va a hacer que los clientes potenciales pasen por delante de diversos negocios como pueden ser tiendas, restaurantes… y, por tanto, favorecerá la actividad económica. La reapertura del museo va a ayudar a vertebrar un poco el interior de Luarca, que nunca tuvo recursos importantes para que hubiese un flujo de personas.") At the time, the museum was still set to reopen on 1 July 2021.

On 28 July 2021, it was reported that the planned reopening at the former nightclub had been delayed until the end of 2021. It was also announced that in 2022 the Principality of Asturias would draw up plans for redeveloping the original harbourside building damaged in 2014. In late 2021, the opening date was pushed back again, initially to the first half of 2022, then to 1 July at the earliest, and later to 15 July. It was reported that the museum is to be entirely dedicated to the giant squid and its ecology, with exhibits divided between nine thematic zones and including content aimed at children and, at a later date, incorporating virtual reality displays. Six complete giant squid specimens are to be exhibited at the museum, plus 35 specimens of other large cephalopod species, 12 deep-sea fish, and a number of cetacean bones. The main exhibits are to be housed in a single room of 225 square metres (2,420 sq ft) that will provide a circular tour taking about half an hour to complete, centred on a life-sized giant squid model. To evoke a sense of the giant squid's deep-ocean habitat, low light and marine sound effects will be used. The museum is planned to stay open 365 days a year. General admission will be €3 (equivalent to US$3.55), with free entry for under-12s.

The exterior design of the museum, completed by early May, came in for criticism from some local politicians (particularly the stylised squid logo for its supposed resemblance to male genitalia), as did the rental price of the premises and the cost of its renovation. The location of the new museum remained controversial, with some favouring the original harbour site and others questioning why so much money had been put towards its creation when a world-class collection of giant cephalopods already existed a few kilometres away in CEPESMA's Parque de la Vida. As of November 2021, the local government had invested around €46,000 (equivalent to US$54,404) in the initial refurbishment of the former nightclub, €14,500 (equivalent to US$17,149) to adapt it for public use, €71,000 (equivalent to US$83,972) for realising the project, and €18,000 (equivalent to US$21,289) for museum development.

"[...] it is a first class attraction and, above all, unique. No one on planet earth has a museum devoted to the form, history and many aspects of the giant squid." (Note: Original Spanish quotation: "[...] es un atractivo de primer nivel, y, sobre todo, singular. Nadie en el planeta tierra tiene un museo vinculado a la figura, la historia en muchos aspectos del calamar gigante.")

— Tino Ron, leader of the Luarcan citizens' movement that demanded the museum's reopening, from a July 2022 interview with Onda Cero

The new museum opened its doors to the public on 15 July 2022. The inauguration was attended by Asturias's Minister of Culture, Language Policy and Tourism, Berta Piñán; the president of the General Junta of the Principality of Asturias, Marcelino Marcos Líndez; the Mayor of Valdés, Óscar Pérez; CEPESMA president and original museum founder, Luis Laria; and members of the University of Oviedo. In its first four days, the museum received around 250 visitors. Following the museum's opening, there are plans for Luarca to host conferences and other events related to large cephalopods, with the local government hoping to secure the cooperation of the University of Oviedo and Parque de la Vida. This will be combined with an effort to promote Luarca as a gastronomic destination for squid tasting.

== See also ==
- Giant Squid Interpretation Site – small museum in Glovers Harbour, Newfoundland
- List of giant squid specimens and sightings
