= Lockesporte, Newfoundland and Labrador =

Coordinates: 49°26′49″N 55°30′30″W

Location of Lockesporte in Newfoundland

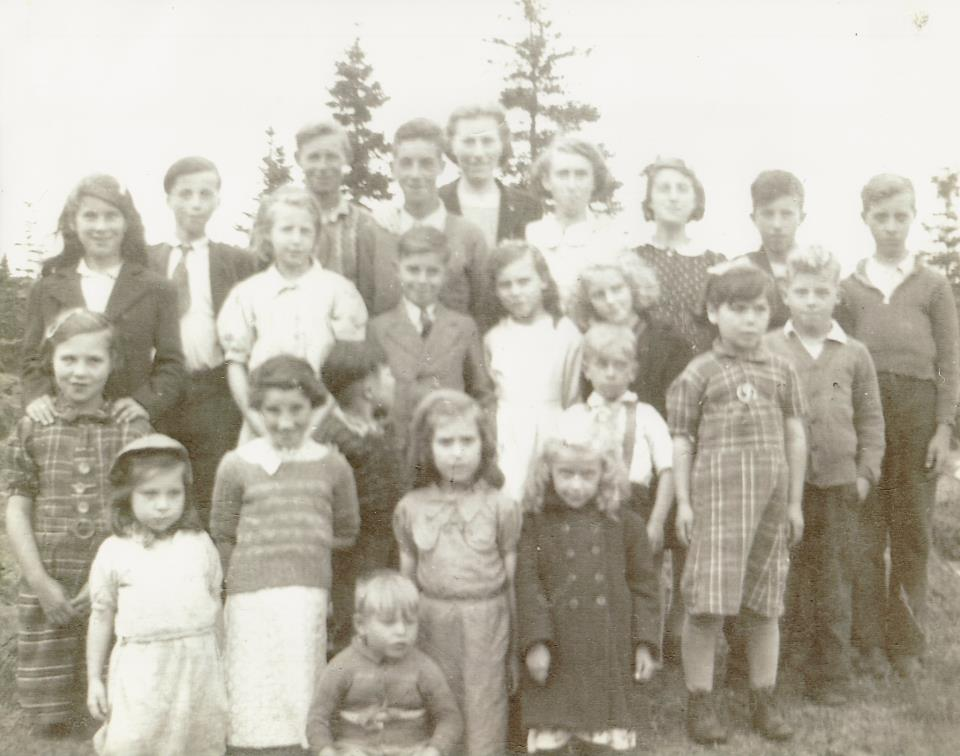
Salvation Army Sunday school in Lock's Harbour, c. 1945

Lockesporte, also spelled Lockesport or Lockport and originally known as Lock's Harbour, (Note: Not to be confused with the nearby Lock's Cove to the north (itself distinct from two other abandoned settlements by this name: one in Hare Bay, Great Northern Peninsula [see Locks Cove] and the other near Cul De Sac East on Newfoundland's southern coast), nor the settlement of Lock's Harbour that once existed at the northern extremity of the peninsula separating Seal Bay and Badger Bay, which was already largely abandoned by the early 20th century.) was a fishing village and logging community on the eastern coast of Seal Bay, within the much larger Notre Dame Bay, Newfoundland, Canada.

Lockesporte first appeared in census records in 1869 (as Lock's Harbour), at which point it was recorded as having 34 inhabitants, though this likely included the residents of neighbouring Winter House Cove. The population fell to a low of 15 in 1911, before rebounding to 74 in 1951. In the late 1960s, both it and Winter House Cove were resettled, with 39 Lockesporte residents moving to Glovers Harbour and the remainder to Leading Tickles, Point Leamington, and Deer Lake.

== See also ==
- List of ghost towns in Newfoundland and Labrador
