= Luarca =

Luarca/Ḷḷuarca
- Parish
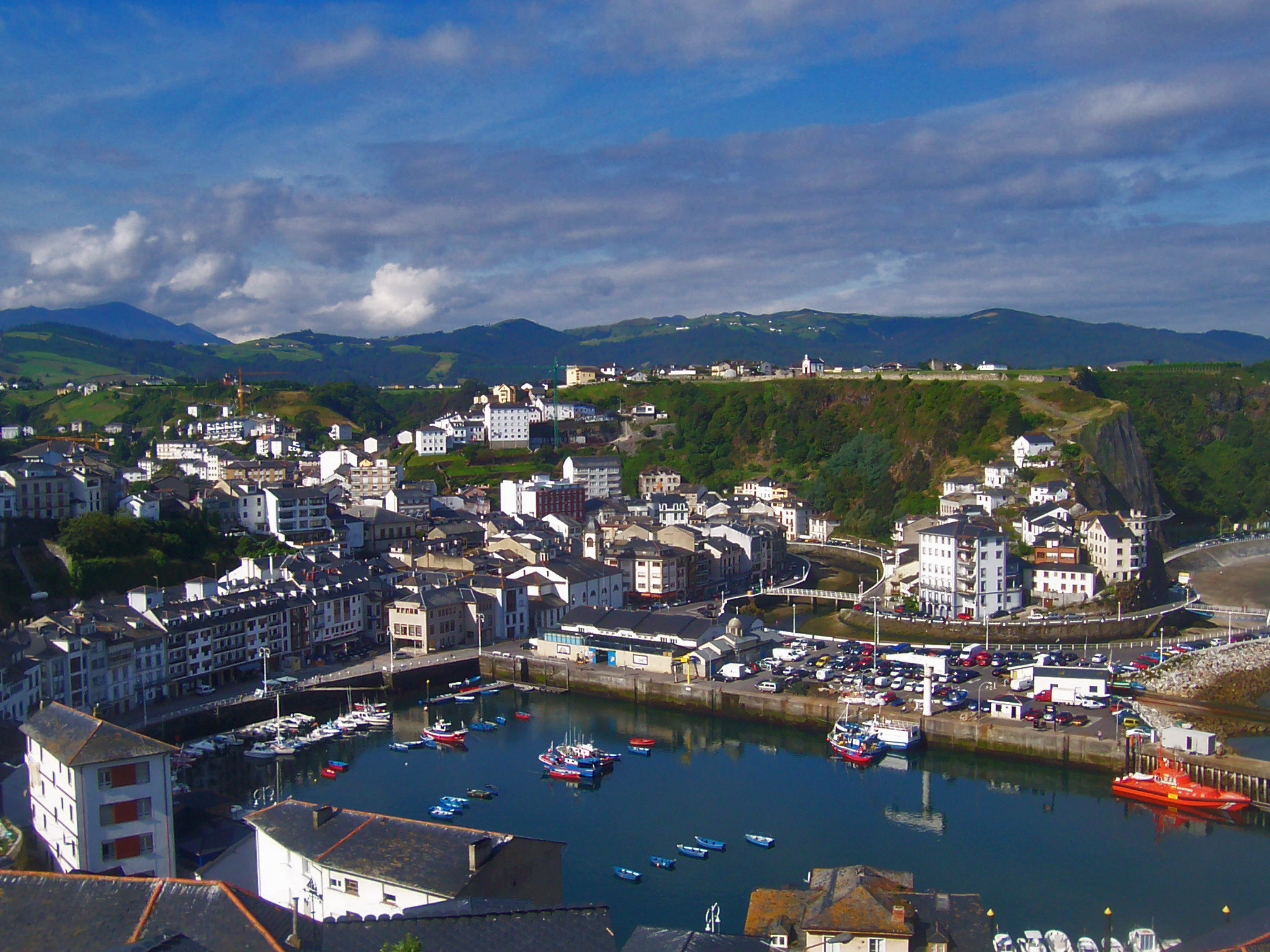
- Interactive map of Luarca/Ḷḷuarca
- Coordinates: 43°32′32″N 6°32′9″W
- Country: Spain
- Autonomous community: Asturias
- Province: Asturias
- Comarca: Comarca Vaqueira
- Municipality: Valdés

Area
  - Total: 5.84 km^{2} (2.25 sq mi)
- Highest elevation: 110 m (360 ft)

Population (2021)
  - Total: 4,670 (parish)
  - Density: 799.7/km^{2} (2,071/sq mi)
- Demonym: luarqués/luarquesa

Luarca (Ḷḷuarca in Asturian and coofficially) is a parish and the principal town in the municipality of Valdés in Asturias, Spain.

Luarca (town) is a fishing and pleasure port. Luarca (parish) had a population of 4,670 (2021), and an area of 5.84 km^{2} (2.25 sq mi). The town is 90 km (56 mi) from Oviedo, the capital of Asturias. The Nobel laureate for Medicine in 1959, Severo Ochoa, was born in Luarca. It is well known for its beautiful architecture, landscapes, gastronomy, and tourist attractions. San Timoteo festivities usually attract thousands of people every August.

Museo del Calamar Gigante, said to be the world's only museum dedicated to the giant squid, was based in the town from its opening in 2010 to its destruction by a storm in 2014; it reopened at a new location in the centre of town in 2022.

== Etymology ==
Xosé Lluis García Arias proposes two possible etymologies for the place name 'Luarca', attested in medieval Latin as 'uillam Luarcam' (912), both of Latin origin:

- From "ARCAM" ("ark", but which could also mean "cistern, reservoir") and the pronoun (later article) "ILLUM", although this theory faces a significant problem: the difference in gender between the article (neuter) and "ARCAM" (feminine) would make this combination impossible or highly unlikely. For this reason, García Arias considers the second possibility more likely:
- From "*(VILLAM) LUPERCAM", in relation to "Lupercus", the name of a Roman god and also documented as a noun referring to the priests who practiced the cult of this god. Thus, it would have evolved from LUPERCAM > *lloberca > *lloerca > *lluerca —> lluarca, with a change from the diphthong ue to ua, which is entirely acceptable in medieval Western Asturian, where this diphthong could be highly unstable. This evolution might also explain the form used by Valdesan poet Fernán Coronas when referring to the town in the early 20th century as "Tsubarca" (Ḷḷubarca).

== Way of St. James ==
The Way of St. James named The Northern Way (Camino de la Costa) passes through Luarca.

== Economy ==
Fishery and agriculture have dominated the region for hundreds of years. Luarca is the place from where ALSA bus company began operating. ALSA closed its Luarca's bus station in 2009.

== Climate ==
The town experiences warm summers and relatively mild winters, but strong storms occur in autumn.

== Points of interest ==
- The Fishery Harbour
- Palace of the Marquis of Ferrera
- Lighthouse of Luarca
- Giant Squid Museum

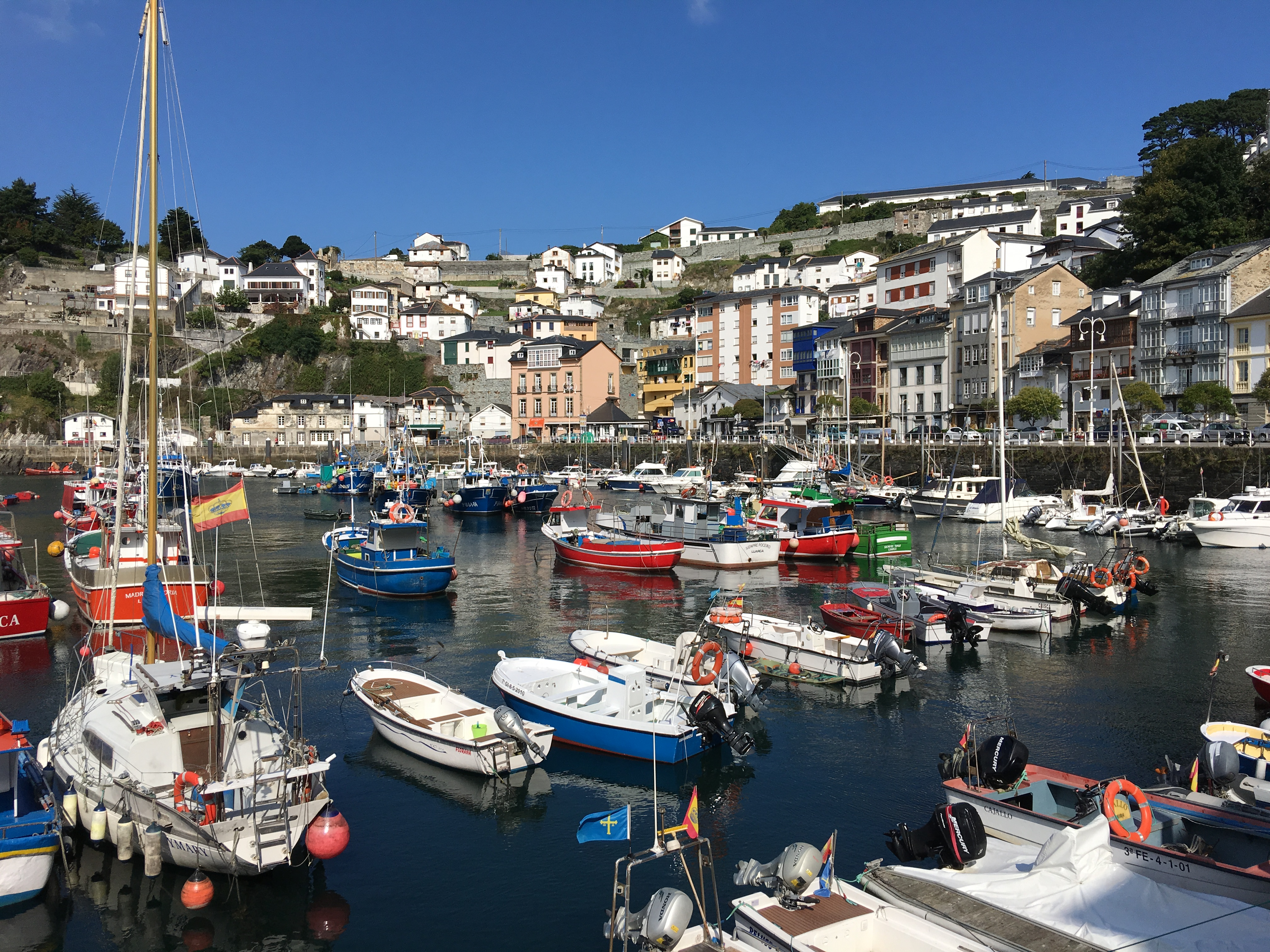
Boats in the harbour, Luarca, Spain.

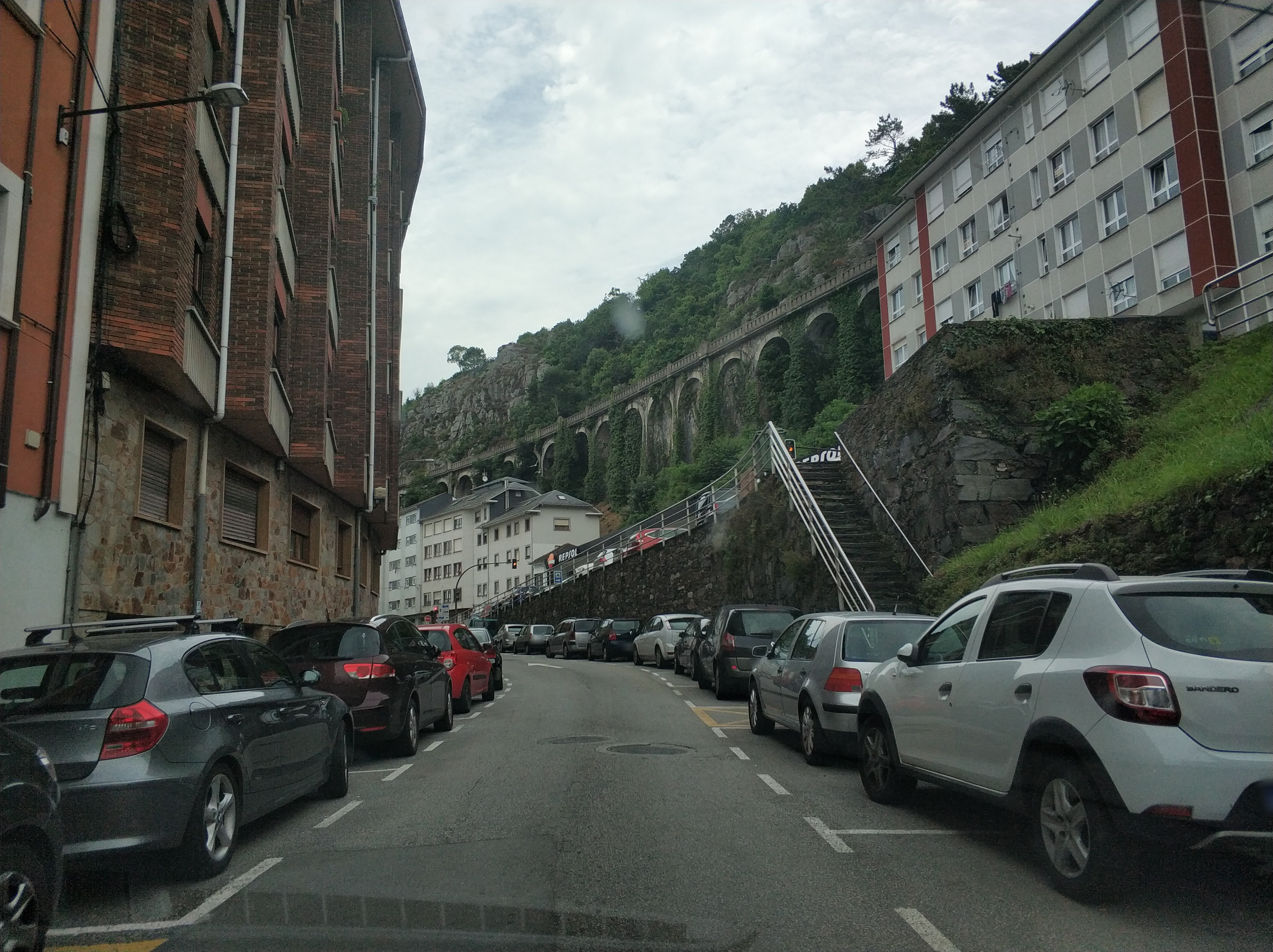
A street in Luarca

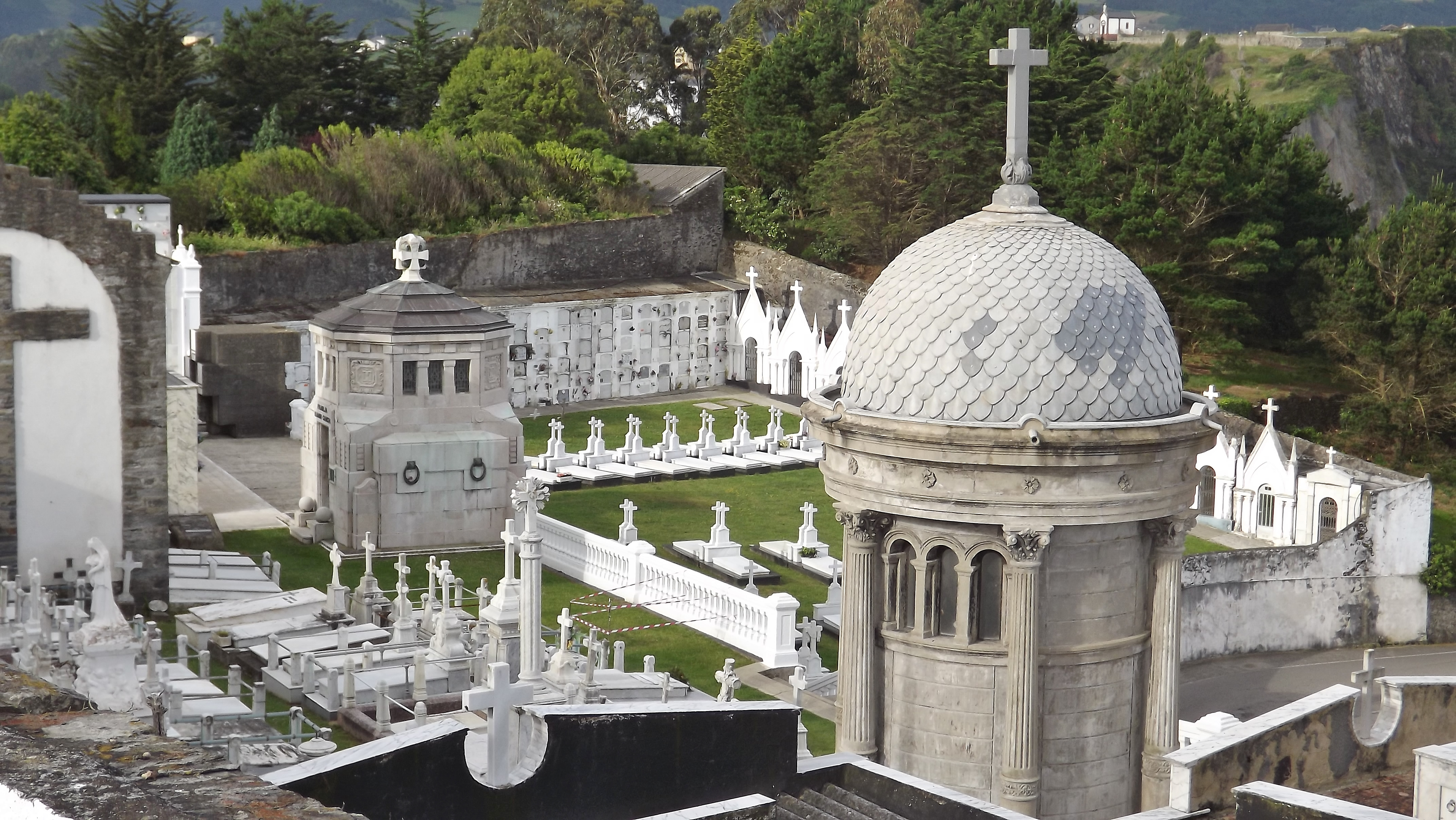
Luarca cemetery

== Notable people ==
- Severo Ochoa (1905–1993), physician and biochemist, Nobel prizewinner

== Villages in Luarca (parish) ==
- Luarca/Ḷḷuarca (town): population 3,620 (2021)
- Almuña: 870 (2021) 43°32′01″N 6°31′29″W
- Fontouria: 92 (2021) 43°31′28″N 6°31′42″W
- Barceḷḷina: 87 (2021) 43°32′27″N 6°31′08″W
- Portizuelu: 1 (2021)
