= Winter House Cove, Newfoundland and Labrador =

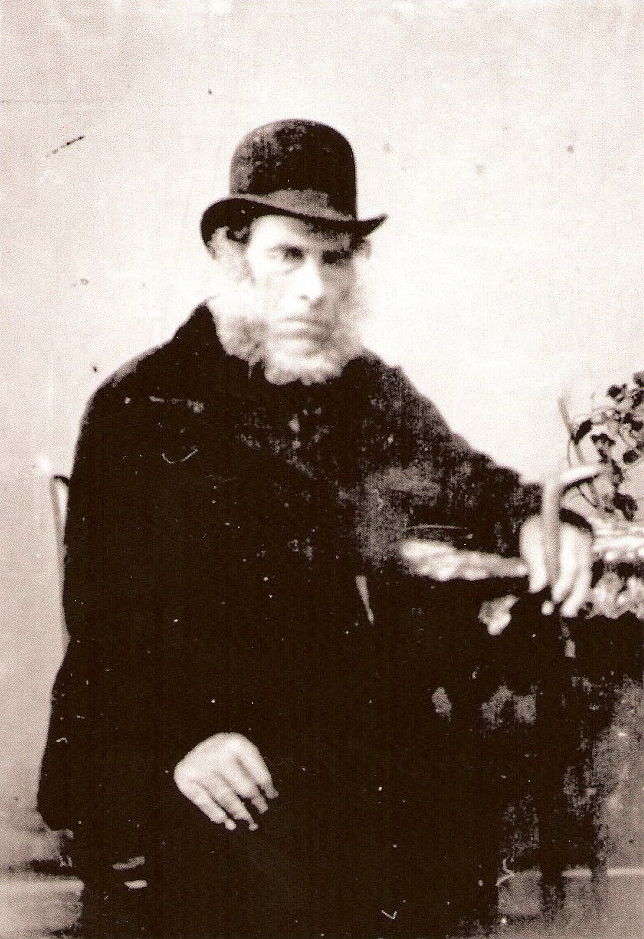
George Marsh, founder of Winter House Cove

Winter House Cove was a fishing village on the eastern coast of Seal Bay, within the much larger Notre Dame Bay, Newfoundland, Canada.

According to tradition, George Marsh (born George Hood; 1825–1911), originally from near Wareham, Dorset, and his wife Louisa (née Loder) were the first permanent settlers and founded the community c. 1858–1860.

Winter House Cove had a population of 52 in 1966, down from a high of 74 in 1945. In the late 1960s, both it and nearby Lockesporte were resettled to Glovers Harbour, which survives to the present day.

== See also ==
- List of ghost towns in Newfoundland and Labrador
