= 1945 census of Newfoundland =

Last census conducted in Newfoundland prior to joining Canada

1945 Census of Newfoundland
← 1935	October 1, 1945	1951 →

General information
- Country: Newfoundland

Results
- Total population: 321,819 (▲11.1%)

The 1945 census of Newfoundland was the eleventh population census taken in Newfoundland and Labrador, and the last to take place prior to the 1948 Newfoundland referendums which resulted in it joining Canada in 1949. The census took place on October 1, 1945, and was fully published on December 1, 1949, seven months after its accession to Canada. Despite being carried out by the government of Newfoundland, tabulation and publication of the census was carried out by the Canadian Dominion Bureau of Statistics.

The total population count of Newfoundland and Labrador in 1945 was 321,819. This was an 11.1% increase over the 1935 census of 289,588. The next census that took place was in 1951, as part of Canada.

== Census summary ==
A summary of information about Newfoundland.

Total population	321,819
Families	68,000
Dwellings	62,418
Men	164,595
Women	157,224

For census purposes, Newfoundland and Labrador was divided into 25 census districts, 24 on the island of Newfoundland and the last consisting of the entirety of Labrador.

Census District	1945 census	1935 census	1921 census	% change 1935-1945	% change 1921-1945
White Bay	10,745	8,721	6,542	23.2	64.2
Green Bay	8,606	8,257	8,401	4.2	2.4
Grand Falls	19,458	14,373	9,227	35.4	110.9
Twillingate	9,566	8,798	8,591	8.7	11.3
Fogo	10,077	9,590	9,224	5.1	9.2
Bonavista North	12,978	12,319	12,605	5.3	3.0
Bonavista South	11,584	11,753	12,149	-1.4	-4.7
Trinity North	12,808	12,766	12,701	0.3	0.8
Trinity South	10,983	11,088	10,688	-0.9	2.8
Carbonear–Baie de Verde	12,825	13,409	15,307	-4.4	-16.2
Harbour Grace	7,249	7,563	8,196	-4.2	-11.6
Port de Grave	8,278	8,750	9,991	-5.4	-17.1
Harbour Main–Bell Island	17,549	15,017	13,619	16.9	28.9
St. John’s West	36,435	29,565	24,791	23.2	47.0
St. John’s East	28,821	25,321	23,010	13.8	25.3
Ferryland	6,346	6,682	7,367	-5.0	-13.9
Placentia–St. Mary’s	9,448	8,454	8,504	11.8	11.1
Placentia West	9,653	9,575	9,667	0.8	-0.1
Burin	10,940	10,668	10,293	2.5	6.3
Fortune Bay–Hermitage	11,445	11,334	10,540	1.0	8.6
Burgeo–La Poile	9,357	9,293	8,645	0.7	8.2
St. George’s–Port au Port	13,074	9,748	8,822	34.1	48.2
Humber	20,560	15,166	4,745	35.6	333.3
St. Barbe	7,509	6,662	5,634	12.7	33.3
Newfoundland subtotal	316,294	284,872	259,259	11.0	22.0
Labrador	5,525	4,716	3,774	17.2	46.4
Newfoundland and Labrador total	321,819	289,588	263,033	11.1	22.3

Among the census districts which saw a population decrease from 1935, three of them are located in the vicinity of Conception Bay.

In the 1945 census, one settlement—St. John’s (population 44,603)—recorded more than 10,000 inhabitants. Two others, Corner Brook (population 8,711) and Bell Island (total population 8,171; settlement population 6,028), had a population exceeding 5,000.

== See also ==
- History of Newfoundland and Labrador
- Dominion of Newfoundland
- Ethnic groups in Canada
- History of immigration to Canada
