= Moses Harvey =

Newfoundland minister and naturalist (1820–1901)

Moses Harvey FRSC FRGS
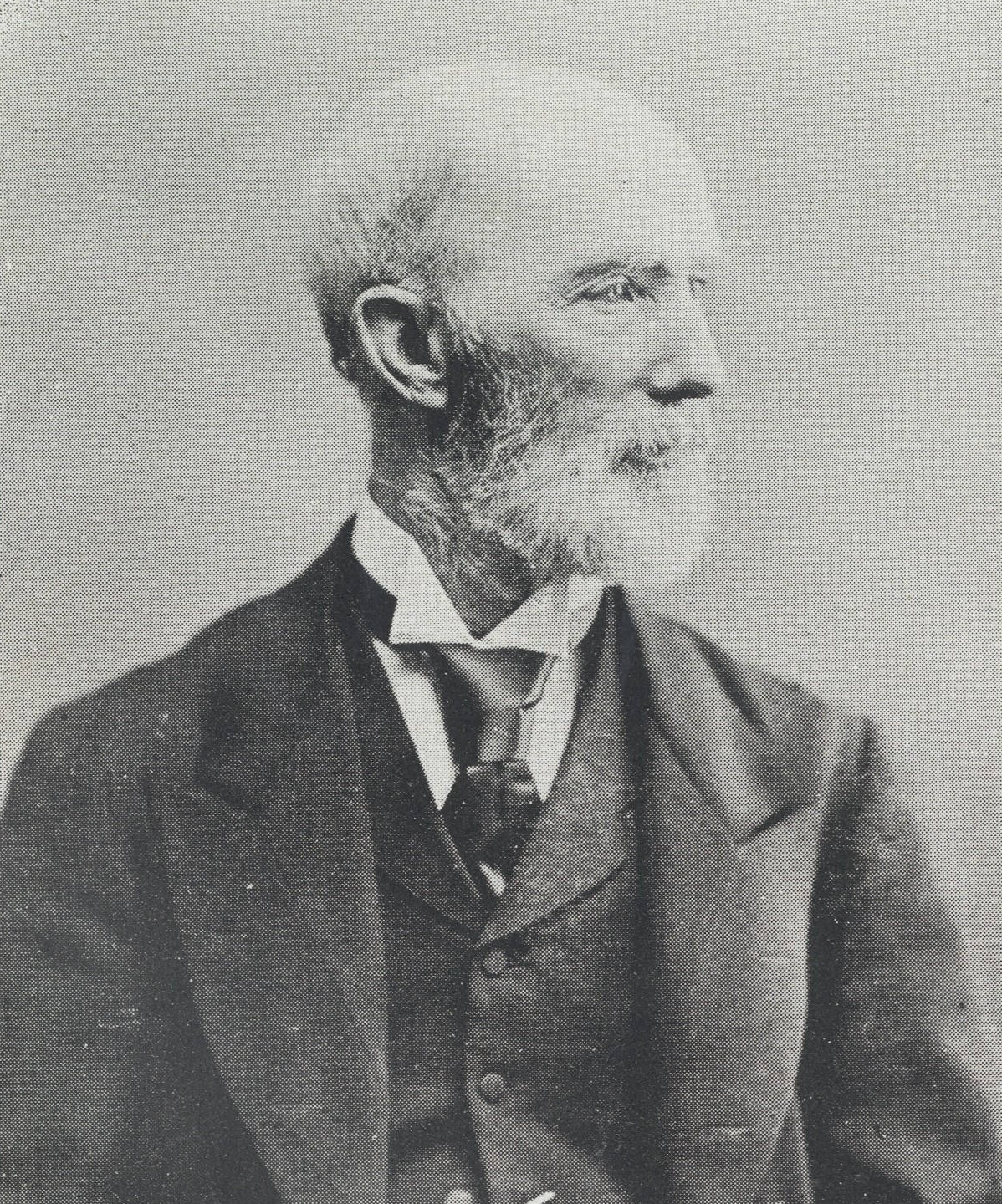
- Born: 21 March 1820; Armagh, Ireland
- Died: 3 September 1901 (aged 81); St. John's, Newfoundland
- Education: Royal Belfast Academical Institution, Belfast
- Notable work: The Newfoundland Encyclopedia (1897); The Giant Squid (1874)
- Spouse: Sarah Anee (Jessie) Browne
- Children: 3 sons
- Parents: James Harvey; Jane Holmes

Moses Harvey (21 March 1820 – 3 September 1901) was an Irish-born Newfoundland clergyman, essayist and naturalist. He is notable for his contributions to the fields of natural history and literature.

== Biography ==
Harvey was of Scottish descent and was educated at the Royal Academical Institute at Belfast. He became an ordained minister in the Presbyterian ministry in 1844. Harvey served at the John Street Presbyterian Church, Maryport, Cumberland, England, until he emigrated to St. John's in 1852 with his bride Sarah Anne Browne. He served at St. Andrews Free Presbyterian Church in St. John's. He wrote over 900 articles for the Montreal Gazette over a 24-year period, some under the pen name Delta. Harvey is the co-founder of the Evening Mercury newspaper.

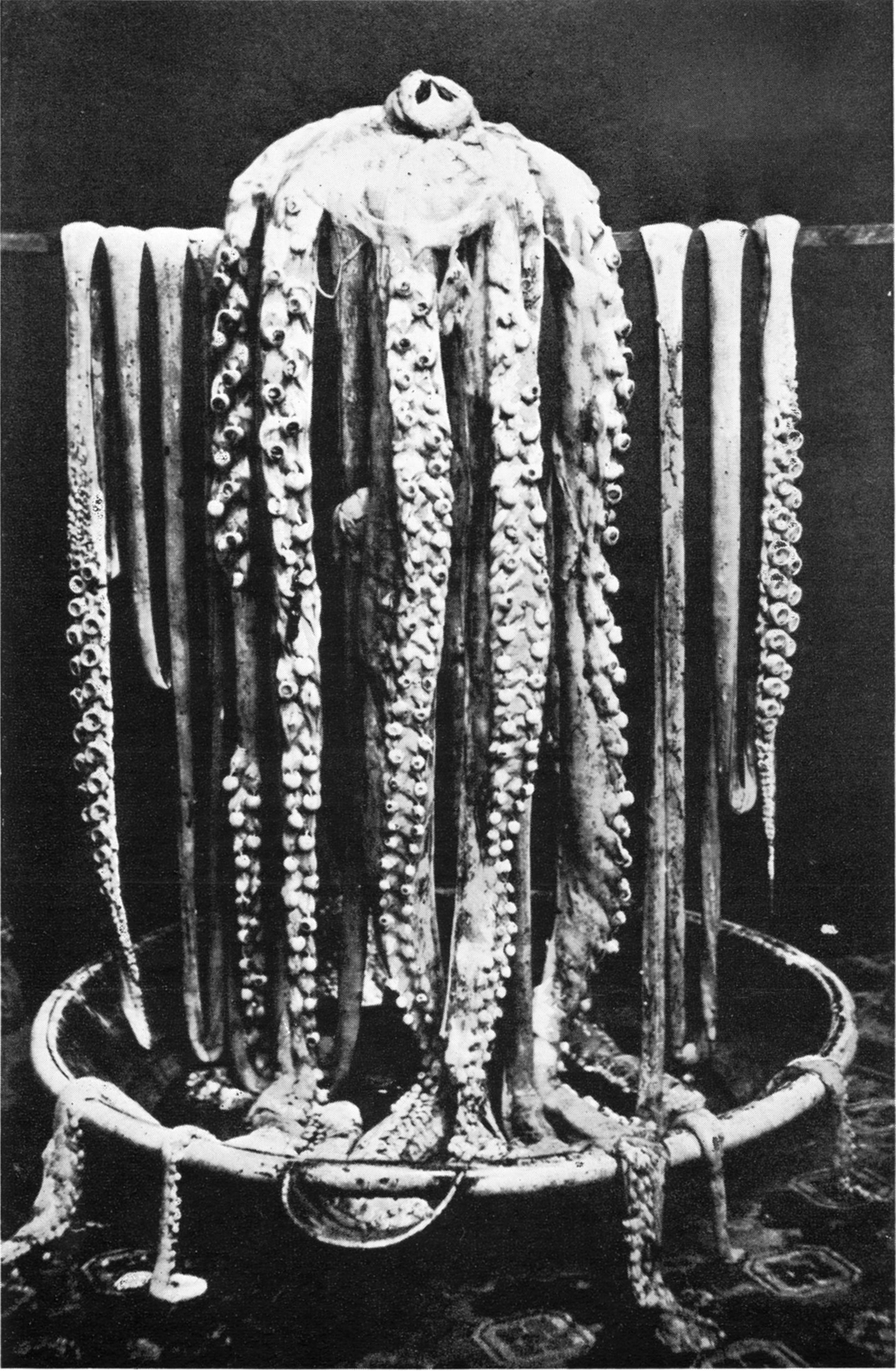
The first complete specimen of a giant squid, shown in Moses Harvey's bathtub

Harvey studied many aspects of Newfoundland's natural history, most notably the habits of the giant squid. One species, Architeuthis harveyi, was named in recognition of his work. It was largely through his efforts that the giant squid became known to British and American zoologists.

Harvey's interests in Newfoundland were varied: he had called for the creation of a cross-island railroad, he was president of the St. John's Athenaeum Society, he pressed for the development of mining in Newfoundland and he also catalogued the rocks, birds and wild flowers of the island. In 1885 he published the book Text Book of Newfoundland History. His best-known and most prominent book was Newfoundland, The Oldest British Colony, which he co-authored with Joseph Hatton and published in 1883. In 1886, he was elected a Fellow of the Royal Geographical Society and of the Royal Society of Canada in 1891. Harvey was awarded the honorary degree of LL.D. from McGill University in 1891.

Harvey served as Secretary to the Newfoundland Fisheries Commission and wrote and lectured a remarkable document entitled The Artificial Propagation of Marine Food Fishes and Edible Crustaceans, which was published in the Royal Society's transactions for 1892–1893 (volume 9).

He died in 1901.

== See also ==
- List of people of Newfoundland and Labrador
