= List of unincorporated communities in Newfoundland and Labrador =

This article lists unincorporated communities of the province of Newfoundland and Labrador, Canada.

Incorporated towns and cities are incorporated municipalities and can be found on List of municipalities in Newfoundland and Labrador.

Newfoundland and Labrador at Confederation in 1949 had nearly 1,450 communities. Today it has fewer than 700. A listing of abandoned communities is found at the List of ghost towns in Newfoundland and Labrador.

== A ==
- Aaron Arm, Burgeo (Newfoundland)
- Allan's Island, Lamaline (Newfoundland)
- Amherst Cove (Newfoundland)
- Angelbrook, Glovertown (Newfoundland)
- Angels Cove (Newfoundland)
- Apsey Beach (Newfoundland)
- Apsey Brook (Newfoundland)
- Arnold's Cove Station (Newfoundland)
- Aspen Cove (Newfoundland)

== B ==
- Back Cove, Fogo (Newfoundland)
- Back Harbour, Twillingate (Newfoundland)
- Bacon Cove, Conception Harbour (Newfoundland)
- Badger's Quay, New-Wes-Valley (Newfoundland)
- Bailey's Cove, Bonavista (Newfoundland)
- Bailey's Point, Glenburnie-Birchy Head-Shoal Brook (Newfoundland)
- Ballyhack, Avondale (Newfoundland)
- Bank Head (Newfoundland)
- Bannatyne Cove, Corner Brook (Newfoundland)
- Barachois Brook (Newfoundland)
- Bareneed (Newfoundland)
- Barr'd Harbour (Newfoundland)
- Barr'd Islands, Fogo (Newfoundland)
- Bartletts Harbour (Newfoundland)
- Barton (Newfoundland)
- Bauline East (Newfoundland)
- Bayview, Twillingate (Newfoundland)
- Beaches (Newfoundland)
- Beachy Cove, Bay Roberts (Newfoundland)
- Beau Bois (Newfoundland)
- Beaumont, Lushes Bight-Beaumont-Beaumont North (Newfoundland)
- Bellevue (Newfoundland)
- Benoits Cove (Newfoundland)
- Benoits Siding (Newfoundland)
- Benton (Newfoundland)
- Bickfordville (Newfoundland)
- Birchy Cove (Newfoundland)
- Biscay Bay (Newfoundland)
- Black Duck (Newfoundland)
- Black Duck Brook (Newfoundland)
- Black Duck Cove, Great Northern Peninsula (Newfoundland)
- Black Duck Cove, Notre Dame Bay (Newfoundland)
- Black Duck Pond (Newfoundland)
- Black River (Newfoundland)
- Black Tickle (Labrador)
- Blaketown (Newfoundland)
- Bloomfield (Newfoundland)
- Blow Me Down, Conception Bay (Newfoundland)
- Blue Cove (Newfoundland)
- Boat Harbour (Newfoundland)
- Bobby's Cove (Newfoundland)
- Boswarlos (Newfoundland)
- Bottle Cove (Newfoundland)
- Boxey, St. Jacques-Coomb's Cove (Newfoundland)
- Boyd's Cove (Newfoundland)
- Bradley's Cove (Newfoundland)
- Bridgeport (Newfoundland)
- Brig Bay (Newfoundland)
- Brigus Junction (Newfoundland)
- Brigus South (Newfoundland)
- Bristol's Hope (Newfoundland)
- Britannia (Newfoundland)
- Broad Cove, Trinity Bay (Newfoundland)
- The Broads, South River (Newfoundland)
- Brookfield (Newfoundland)
- Brooklyn (Newfoundland)
- Brookside (Newfoundland)
- Brown's Arm (Newfoundland)
- Buchans Junction (Newfoundland)
- Buckle's Point, Forteau (Newfoundland)
- Bunyan's Cove (Newfoundland)
- Burgoyne's Cove (Newfoundland)
- Burnt Cove (Newfoundland)
- Burnt Point (Newfoundland)
- Butlerville, Bay Roberts (Newfoundland)
- Butter Cove (Newfoundland)

== C ==
- Calvert (Newfoundland)
- Canning's Cove (Newfoundland)
- Cape Freels (Newfoundland)
- Cape Norman (Newfoundland
- Cape Ray (Newfoundland)
- Caplin Cove, Conception Bay (Newfoundland)
- Cappahayden, Renews-Cappahayden (Newfoundland)
- Capstan Island (Labrador)
- Carter's Cove (Newfoundland)
- Cartyville (Newfoundland)
- Castor River North (Newfoundland)
- Catalina, Trinity Bay North (Newfoundland)
- Cavendish (Newfoundland)
- Chamberlains, Conception Bay South (Newfoundland)
- Champneys (Newfoundland)
- Chanceport (Newfoundland)
- Chapel's Cove, Harbour Main-Chapel's Cove-Lakeview (Newfoundland)
- Charles Brook (Newfoundland)
- Charleston (Newfoundland)
- Charlottetown (Newfoundland)
- Churchill Falls (Labrador)
- Clarke's Head (Newfoundland)
- Cobb's Arm (Newfoundland)
- Codroy (Newfoundland)
- Coffee Cove (Newfoundland)
- Coley's Point, Bay Roberts (Newfoundland)
- Comfort Cove, Comfort Cove-Newstead (Newfoundland)
- Cottrell's Cove (Newfoundland)
- Croque (Newfoundland)
- Cull's Harbour (Newfoundland)
- Cupids Crossing, Cupids (Newfoundland)
- Curling, Corner Brook (Newfoundland)
- Cuslett (Newfoundland)

== D ==
- Dawson's Cove (Newfoundland)
- Deadman's Bay (Newfoundland)
- Deadman's Cove (Newfoundland)
- Deep Bay (Newfoundland)
- Deep Bight (Newfoundland)
- Dildo (Newfoundland)
- The Dock (Newfoundland)
- Domino (Labrador)
- Donovans, Paradise (Newfoundland)
- Doting Cove, Musgrave Harbour (Newfoundland)
- The Droke, Burin (Newfoundland)
- Dunfield (Newfoundland)
- Dunville, Placentia (Newfoundland)
- Durrell, Twillingate (Newfoundland)

== E ==
- Eddies Cove East (Newfoundland)
- Eddies Cove West (Newfoundland)
- Elliott's Cove (Newfoundland)
- English Harbour (Newfoundland)
- English Harbour West, St. Jacques-Coomb's Cove (Newfoundland)
- Epworth (Newfoundland)

== F ==
- Fair Haven (Newfoundland)
- Fairbanks (Newfoundland)
- Felix Cove (Newfoundland)
- Flat Bay (Newfoundland)
- Flat Bay West (Newfoundland)
- Fogo (Fogo Island, Newfoundland)
- Forrester's Point (Newfoundland)
- Fortune Harbour (Newfoundland)
- Fox Island, Hermitage Bay (Newfoundland)
- Fox Island River (Newfoundland)
- Fox Roost (Newfoundland)
- Foxtrap (Conception Bay South, Newfoundland)
- Francois (Newfoundland)
- Frederickton (Newfoundland)
- Frenchman's Cove (Humber Arm South, Newfoundland)
- Freshwater, Bell Island (Newfoundland)
- Freshwater, Conception Bay (Newfoundland)
- Freshwater, Placentia Bay (Placentia, Newfoundland)

== G ==
- Gander Bay South (Newfoundland)
- Garden Cove (Newfoundland)
- George's Brook (George's Brook-Milton, Newfoundland)
- George's Cove (Labrador)
- Georgetown (Newfoundland)
- Gin Cove (Newfoundland)
- Goobies (Newfoundland)
- Goose Cove, Hare Bay (Goose Cove East, Newfoundland)
- Goose Cove, Placentia Bay (Newfoundland)
- Goose Cove, Trinity Bay (Newfoundland)
- Gooseberry Cove, Placentia Bay (Newfoundland)
- Gooseberry Cove, Trinity Bay (Newfoundland)
- Goulds (St. John's, Newfoundland)
- Goulds Road (Newfoundland)
- Grand Bay West (Newfoundland)
- Grand Beach (Newfoundland)
- Grand Falls (Grand Falls-Windsor, Newfoundland)
- Grandois (Newfoundland)
- Grates Cove (Newfoundland)
- Great Barasway (Newfoundland)
- Great Brehat (Newfoundland)
- Great Codroy (Newfoundland)
- Green Cove (Newfoundland)
- Green Island Cove (Newfoundland)
- Green Point (Newfoundland)
- Green's Harbour (Newfoundland)
- Grey River (Newfoundland)
- Gull Island (Newfoundland)

== H ==
- Halfway Point, Humber Arm South (Newfoundland)
- Halls Town, North River (Newfoundland)
- Hamilton River, Happy Valley-Goose Bay (Newfoundland)
- Harbour Grace South (Newfoundland)
- Harbour le Cou (Newfoundland)
- Harbour Mille (Newfoundland)
- Harbour Round (Newfoundland)
- Harcourt (Newfoundland)
- Harry's Harbour (Newfoundland)
- Hatchet Cove (Newfoundland)
- Heart's Delight (Newfoundland)
- Heatherton (Newfoundland)
- Henley Harbour (Labrador)
- Herring Neck (Newfoundland)
- Hibb's Cove (Newfoundland)
- Hickman's Harbour (Newfoundland)
- Highlands (Newfoundland)
- Hillgrade (Newfoundland)
- Hillview (Newfoundland)
- Hiscock's Point (Newfoundland)
- Hodge's Cove (Newfoundland)
- Hopeall (Newfoundland)
- Hopewell (Newfoundland)
- Horwood (Newfoundland)

== I ==
- Indian Arm (Newfoundland)
- Indian Cove (Newfoundland)
- Island Harbour (Newfoundland)
- Islington, Heart's Delight-Islington (Newfoundland)
- Ivany's Cove (Newfoundland)

== J ==
- Jacques Fontaine, St. Bernard's-Jacques Fontaine (Newfoundland)
- Jamestown (Newfoundland)
- Jean de Baie (Newfoundland)
- Jeffrey's (Newfoundland)
- Jerry's Nose (Newfoundland)
- Jerseyside, Placentia (Newfoundland)
- Job's Cove (Newfoundland)
- Journois (Newfoundland)

== K ==
- Kelligrews (Newfoundland)
- Kerley's Harbour (Newfoundland)
- Kettle Cove (Newfoundland)
- The Keys (Newfoundland)
- Kilbride (Newfoundland)
- Kingston (Newfoundland)
- Kingwell (Newfoundland)
- Kitchuses (Newfoundland)
- Knight's Cove (Newfoundland)

== L ==
- La Manche (Newfoundland)
- La Manche Mines (Newfoundland)
- La Poile (Newfoundland)
- Ladle Cove (Newfoundland)
- Lady Cove (Newfoundland)
- Lake Siding (Newfoundland)
- Lally Cove (Newfoundland)
- Lancaster (Newfoundland)
- Lance Cove (Newfoundland)
- Langue de Cerf (Newfoundland)
- L'Anse Amour (Labrador)
- L'Anse aux Meadows (Newfoundland)
- Laurenceton (Newfoundland)
- Lead Cove (Newfoundland)
- Lethbridge (Newfoundland)
- Little Barasway (Newfoundland)
- Little Catalina, Trinity Bay North (Newfoundland)
- Little Harbour (Newfoundland)
- Little Harbour Deep (Newfoundland)
- Little Harbour East (Newfoundland)
- Little Heart's Ease (Newfoundland)
- Little Paradise (Newfoundland)
- Little Port (Newfoundland)
- Little Rapids (Newfoundland)
- Little Ridge (Newfoundland)
- Little St. Lawrence (Newfoundland)
- Lobster Cove (Newfoundland)
- Lobster Harbour (Newfoundland)
- Loch Leven (Newfoundland)
- Loch Lomond (Newfoundland)
- Lockport (Newfoundland)
- Locks Cove (Newfoundland)
- Lockston (Newfoundland)
- Lomond (Newfoundland)
- Long Beach (Newfoundland)
- Loon Bay (Newfoundland)
- Low Point (Newfoundland)
- Lower Cove (Newfoundland)
- Lower Island Cove (Newfoundland)
- Lower Lance Cove (Newfoundland)

== M ==
- Maberly (Newfoundland)
- Maddox Cove (Petty Harbour-Maddox Cove, Newfoundland)
- Mahers (Newfoundland)
- Main Point (Newfoundland)
- Mainland (Newfoundland)
- Makinsons (Newfoundland)
- Mall Bay (Newfoundland)
- Manuel's Cove (Newfoundland)
- Manuels (Newfoundland)
- Margaree (Newfoundland)
- Markland (Newfoundland)
- Marysvale (Newfoundland)
- Matthews Cove (Labrador)
- Mattis Point (Newfoundland)
- McCallum (Newfoundland)
- McKay's (Newfoundland)
- Melrose (Newfoundland)
- Merritt's Harbour (Newfoundland)
- Michael's Harbour (Newfoundland)
- Middle Amherst Cove (Newfoundland)
- Middle Arm, White Bay (Newfoundland)
- Midland (Newfoundland)
- Mill Cove (Newfoundland)
- Miller's Passage (Newfoundland)
- Millertown Junction (Newfoundland)
- Millville (Newfoundland)
- Milton (Newfoundland)
- Mint Brook (Newfoundland)
- Mobile (Newfoundland)
- Molliers (Newfoundland)
- Monkstown (Newfoundland)
- Monroe (Newfoundland)
- Moore's Cove (Newfoundland)
- Moreton's Harbour (Newfoundland)
- Morley's Siding (Newfoundland)
- The Motion (Newfoundland)
- Mud Lake (Labrador)
- Muddy Bay (Labrador)
- Muddy Brook (Newfoundland)
- Muddy Hole (Newfoundland)
- Mulligan (Labrador)
- Murray's Harbour (Labrador)

== N ==
- Natuashish (Labrador)
- The Neck (Newfoundland)
- New Bonaventure (Newfoundland)
- New Bridge (Newfoundland)
- New Chelsea (Newfoundland)
- New Ferolle (Newfoundland)
- New Harbour (Newfoundland)
- New Melbourne (Newfoundland)
- Newman's Cove (Newfoundland)
- Newport (Newfoundland)
- Newtown (Newfoundland)
- Newville (Newfoundland)
- Noddy Bay (Newfoundland)
- Noel's Pond (Newfoundland)
- Noggin Cove (Newfoundland)
- Norman's Bay (Labrador)
- Norris Arm (Newfoundland)
- Norris Arm North (Newfoundland)
- North Branch (Newfoundland)
- North Harbour (Newfoundland)
- North West Arm (Newfoundland)
- North West Brook (Newfoundland)
- Northern Bay (Newfoundland)

== O ==
- Ochre Pit Cove (Newfoundland)
- O'Donnells (Newfoundland)
- Old Bonaventure (Newfoundland)
- Old Shop (Newfoundland)
- Open Hall (Newfoundland)
- O'Regan's (Newfoundland)
- Osmond (Newfoundland)
- Otterbury (Newfoundland)

== P ==
- Patrick's Cove (Newfoundland)
- Perry's Cove (Newfoundland)
- Petite Forte (Newfoundland)
- Petites (Newfoundland)
- Petley (Newfoundland)
- Philips Head (Newfoundland)
- Piccadilly (Newfoundland)
- Piccaire (Newfoundland)
- Pigeon Cove (Newfoundland)
- Pikes Arm (Newfoundland)
- Pinchard's Island (Newfoundland)
- Pines Cove (Newfoundland)
- Pinsent's Arm (Newfoundland)
- Plate Cove East (Newfoundland)
- Plate Cove West (Newfoundland)
- Pleasantville (Newfoundland)
- Plum Point (Newfoundland)
- Point au Mal (Newfoundland)
- Point Enragée (Newfoundland)
- Point La Haye (Newfoundland)
- Point Verde (Newfoundland)
- Pollards Point (Newfoundland)
- Pond Cove (Newfoundland)
- Port Albert (Newfoundland)
- Port Anne (Newfoundland)
- Port au Bras (Newfoundland)
- Port aux Basques, Channel-Port aux Basques (Newfoundland)
- Port de Grave (Newfoundland)
- Port Union, Trinity Bay North (Newfoundland)
- Portland (Newfoundland)
- Portland Creek (Newfoundland)
- Portugal Cove South (Newfoundland)
- Presque (Newfoundland)
- Princeton (Newfoundland)
- Pumbley Cove (Newfoundland)
- Purbeck's Cove (Newfoundland)
- Purcell's Harbour (Newfoundland)
- Pynn's Brook (Newfoundland)

== Q ==
- Queen's Cove (Newfoundland)
- Quidi Vidi, St. John's (Newfoundland)
- Quirpon (Newfoundland)

== R ==
- Ragged Harbour (Newfoundland)
- Random Island (Newfoundland)
- Rantem (Newfoundland)
- Rattling Brook (Newfoundland)
- Red Brook (Newfoundland)
- Red Cliff (Newfoundland)
- Red Cove (Newfoundland)
- Red Head Cove (Newfoundland)
- Reef's Harbour (Newfoundland)
- Renews, Renews-Cappahayden (Newfoundland)
- Richard's Harbour (Newfoundland)
- Rider's Harbour (Newfoundland)
- Roaches Line (Newfoundland)
- Robinsons (Newfoundland)
- Robinsons Bight (Newfoundland)
- Rock Harbour (Newfoundland)
- Rodgers Cove (Newfoundland)
- The Rooms (Newfoundland)
- Round Harbour, Baie Verte (Newfoundland)
- Round Harbour, Bonavista (Newfoundland)
- Round Harbour, Fogo Island (Newfoundland)
- Round Harbour, Fortune Bay (Newfoundland)
- Roundabout (Newfoundland)
- Russells Cove (Newfoundland)

== S ==
- St. Andrew's (Newfoundland)
- St. Anne's (Newfoundland)
- St. Anthony Bight (Newfoundland)
- St. Barbe (Newfoundland)
- St. Carol's (Newfoundland)
- St. Catherine's (Newfoundland)
- St. Chad's (Newfoundland)
- St. David's (Newfoundland)
- St. Fintan's (Newfoundland)
- St. Jones Within (Newfoundland)
- St. Jones Without (Newfoundland)
- St. Joseph's Cove (Newfoundland)
- St. Jude's (Newfoundland)
- St. Leonard's (Newfoundland)
- St. Michaels (Newfoundland)
- St. Patrick's (Newfoundland)
- St. Phillip's (Newfoundland)
- St. Stephen's (Newfoundland)
- St. Teresa (Newfoundland)
- St. Thomas (Newfoundland)
- St. Veronica's (Newfoundland)
- Salmonier (Newfoundland)
- Samiajij Miawpukek (Newfoundland)
- Samson Island (Newfoundland)
- Sandy Point (Newfoundland)
- Searston (Newfoundland)
- Shearstown (Newfoundland)
- Sheaves Cove (Newfoundland)
- Sheppardville (Newfoundland)
- Sheshatshiu (Labrador)
- Ship Cove (Newfoundland)
- Ship Harbour (Newfoundland)
- Shoal Brook (Newfoundland)
- Shoal Cove East (Newfoundland)
- Shoal Cove West (Newfoundland)
- Shoal Harbour (Newfoundland)
- Shoe Cove (Newfoundland)
- Sibley's Cove (Newfoundland)
- Smith Sound
- Smith's Harbour (Newfoundland)
- Snook's Harbour (Newfoundland)
- Sop's Arm (Newfoundland)
- South Branch (Newfoundland)
- South Dildo (Newfoundland)
- Southeast Bight (Newfoundland)
- Southeast Placentia (Newfoundland)
- Southern Arm (Newfoundland)
- Southern Bay (Newfoundland)
- Southport (Newfoundland)
- Southwest Arm (Newfoundland)
- Spanish Room (Newfoundland)
- Spencers Cove (Newfoundland)
- Spillars Cove, Trinity Bay (Newfoundland)
- Spillers Cove (Newfoundland)
- Spread Eagle (Newfoundland)
- Springfield (Newfoundland)
- Stag Harbour (Newfoundland)
- Stanhope (Newfoundland)
- Stock Cove (Newfoundland)
- Stoneville (Newfoundland)
- Straitsview (Newfoundland)
- Summerville (Newfoundland)
- Swain's Island (Newfoundland)
- Sweet Bay (Newfoundland)
- Swift Current (Newfoundland)

== T ==
- Tack's Beach (Newfoundland)
- Taylor's Bay (Newfoundland)
- Tea Cove (Newfoundland)
- Templeman (Newfoundland)
- The Thicket (Newfoundland)
- Thornlea (Newfoundland)
- Thoroughfare (Newfoundland)
- Three Arms (Newfoundland)
- Three Mile Rock (Newfoundland)
- Three Rock Cove (Newfoundland)
- Tibbos Hill (Newfoundland)
- Tickle Cove (Newfoundland)
- Tickle Harbor (Bellevue) (Newfoundland)
- Tickles (Newfoundland)
- Tilt Cove, Twillingate (Newfoundland)
- Tilton (Newfoundland)
- Tizzard's Harbour (Newfoundland)
- Tompkins (Newfoundland)
- Toogood Arm (Newfoundland)
- Topsail, Conception Bay South (Newfoundland)
- Tors Cove (Newfoundland)
- Toslow (Newfoundland)
- Triangle (Labrador)
- Trinity East (Newfoundland)
- Trouty (Newfoundland)
- Turks Cove (Newfoundland)

== U ==
- Upper Amherst Cove (Newfoundland)
- Upper Burgeo (Newfoundland)
- Upper Ferry (Newfoundland)
- Upper Gullies, Conception Bay South (Newfoundland)
- Upper Island Cove (Newfoundland)
- Upper Small Point (Newfoundland)
- Upshall Station (Newfoundland)

== V ==
- Valleyfield, New-Wes-Valley (Newfoundland)
- Vardyville (Newfoundland)
- Venison Island (Labrador)
- Vere Island (Newfoundland)
- Victoria Cove (Newfoundland)
- Villa Marie (Newfoundland)
- Virgin Arm (Newfoundland)
- Voy's Beach (Newfoundland)

== W ==
- West Bay (Newfoundland)
- Woman Cove (Newfoundland)
- Woodville (Newfoundland)
- Woody Island (Newfoundland)

== See also ==
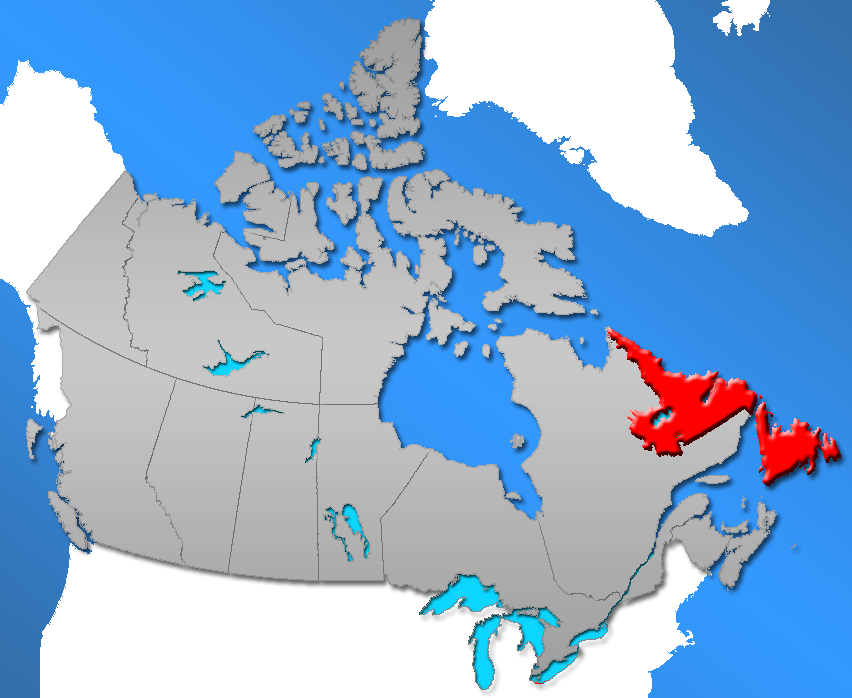
Communities in Canada's provinces and territories
- List of cities in Canada
- List of designated places in Newfoundland and Labrador
- List of municipalities in Newfoundland and Labrador
- List of people from Newfoundland and Labrador
- List of population centres in Newfoundland and Labrador
- Newfoundland outport
