= Round Harbour =

Round Harbour may refer to:

- Round Harbour 2, Newfoundland and Labrador
- Round Harbour, Baie Verte, Newfoundland and Labrador
- Round Harbour, Bonavista, Newfoundland and Labrador
- Round Harbour, Fogo, Newfoundland and Labrador
- Round Harbour, Fortune Bay, Newfoundland and Labrador

== See also ==
- Harbour Round, Newfoundland and Labrador
