= Goose Cove =

Goose Cove may refer to:

- Goose Cove, Hare Bay, Newfoundland and Labrador
- Goose Cove, Placentia Bay, Newfoundland and Labrador
- Goose Cove, Trinity Bay, Newfoundland and Labrador

== See also ==
- Goose Cove East, a town in Newfoundland and Labrador
