= Newfoundland and Labrador Route 403 =

Highway in Newfoundland and Labrador, Canada

Route 403

Route information
- Maintained by Newfoundland and Labrador Department of Transportation and Infrastructure
- Length: 21.3 km (13.2 mi)

Major junctions
- South end: Dead End in Journois
- North end: Route 1 (TCH) near St. George's

Location
- Country: Canada
- Province: Newfoundland and Labrador

Highway system
- Highways in Newfoundland and Labrador
← Route 402	→ Route 404

Route 403 is a minor highway in the western region of Newfoundland in the Canadian province of Newfoundland and Labrador. The highway begins at a junction with the Trans-Canada Highway (Route 1) and continues to its northern terminus, the community of Journois.

== Route description ==
Route 403 begins at an intersection with Route 1 (Trans-Canada Highway) along the banks of Flat Bay Brook. It heads west paralleling the brook to pass through Joyce, where it makes a sharp right turn to the north to enter Flat Bay, where it makes a left turn as it passes through town. The highway now heads southwest along the coastline to pass through Flat Bay West and St. Teresa before coming to a dead end in Journois.

== Major intersections ==
Location	km	mi	Destinations	Notes
	0.0	0.0	Route 1 (TCH) – Corner Brook, Port aux Basques	Southern terminus
Journois	21.3	13.2	Dead End	Northern terminus
1.000 mi = 1.609 km; 1.000 km = 0.621 mi
