= Newfoundland and Labrador Route 215 =

Highway in Newfoundland and Labrador

Route 215
- Petit Forte Road

Route information
- Maintained by Newfoundland and Labrador Department of Transportation and Infrastructure
- Length: 26.6 km (16.5 mi)

Major junctions
- West end: Route 210 near Boat Harbour
- East end: Petit Forte

Location
- Country: Canada
- Province: Newfoundland and Labrador

Highway system
- Highways in Newfoundland and Labrador
← Route 214	→ Route 220

Route 215, also known as Petit Forte Road, is a 26.6-kilometre-long (16.5 mi) east–west highway on the Burin Peninsula of the island of Newfoundland in the province of Newfoundland and Labrador. It connects the towns of Boat Harbour, Brookside, and Petit Forte with Route 210 (Heritage Run/Burin Peninsula Highway).

== Route description ==
Route 215 begins just west of Boat Harbour at an intersection with Route 210 and heads east to immediately pass through the community. It now becomes very curvy and winding as it travels along the coastline through some hills to pass through Brookside before turning inland through remote terrain for several kilometres. The highway now dips to the south to follow the coast again as it enters Petite Forte and passes by a dock for a ferry leading to South East Bight. Route 215 passes through neighbourhoods before coming to an end shortly thereafter at the centre of town. As with most highways in Newfoundland and Labrador, it is entirely a two-lane road for its entire length.

== Major intersections ==
Location	km	mi	Destinations	Notes
	0.0	0.0	Route 210 (Burin Peninsula Highway/Heritage Run) to Route 1 (TCH) – Swift Current, Marystown, Grand Bank Boat Harbour West Road (Route 210-15) - Boat Harbour West	Western terminus; road continues west as Boat Harbour West Road
Petit Forte	26.2	16.3	South East Bight Ferry access	
Petit Forte	26.6	16.5	Fork in the road in downtown	Eastern terminus
1.000 mi = 1.609 km; 1.000 km = 0.621 mi
