= Eddies Cove West =

Human settlement in Newfoundland and Labrador, Canada

Coordinates: 50.751°N 57.167°W

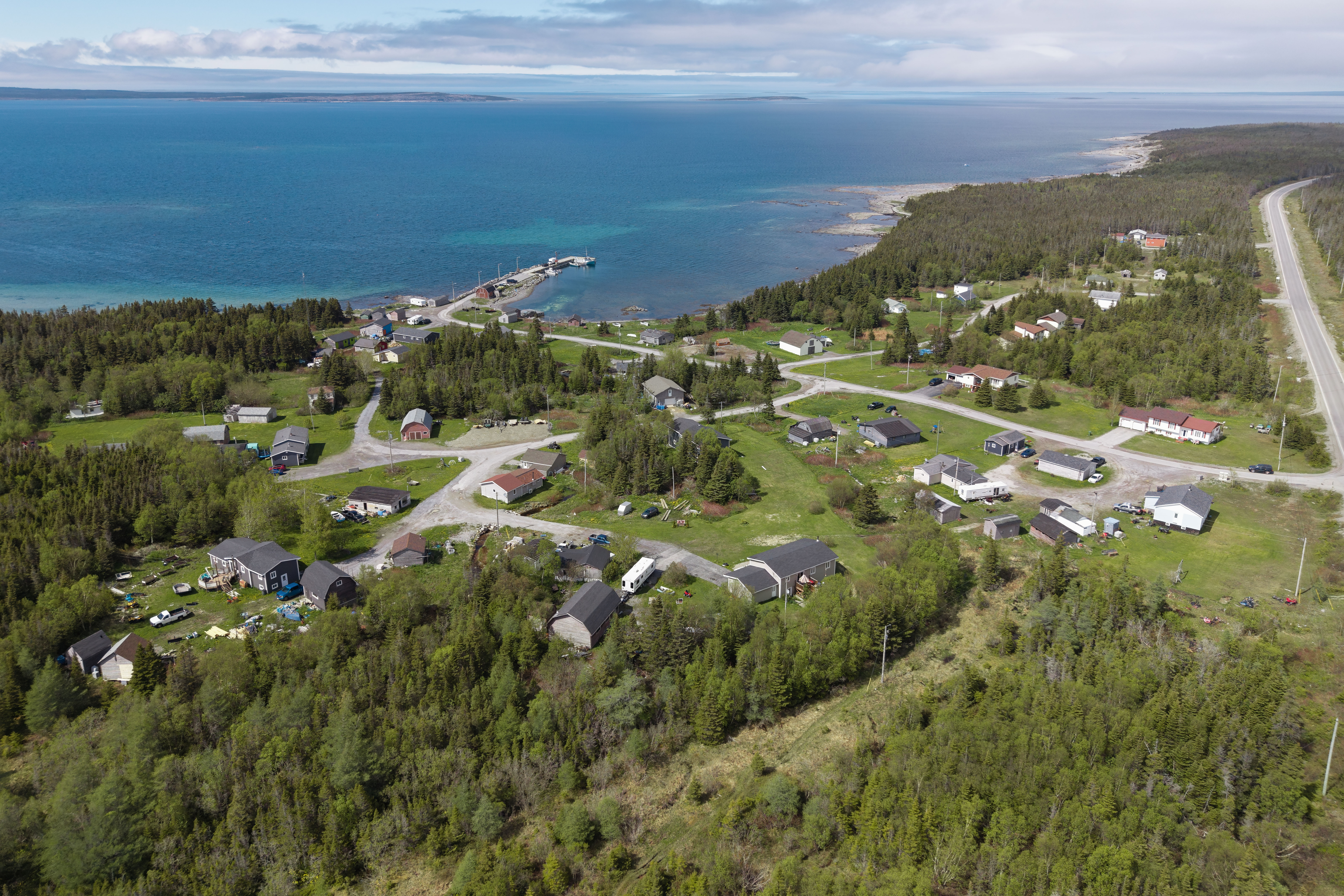
Eddies Cove West in 2026

Location of Eddies Cove West in Newfoundland and Labrador

Eddies Cove West is a local service district and designated place in the Canadian province of Newfoundland and Labrador.

The closest settlements are Port Saunders and Port au Choix.

== Geography ==
Eddies Cove West is in Newfoundland within Subdivision G of Division No. 9.

== Demographics ==
As a designated place in the 2016 Census of Population conducted by Statistics Canada, Eddies Cove West recorded a population of 36 living in 17 of its 48 total private dwellings, a change of -26.5% from its 2011 population of 49. With a land area of 18.1 km^{2} (7.0 sq mi), it had a population density of 2.0/km^{2} (5.2/sq mi) in 2016.

== Government ==
Eddies Cove West is a local service district (LSD) that is governed by a committee responsible for the provision of certain services to the community. The chair of the LSD committee is Alma Mclean.

== See also ==
- List of communities in Newfoundland and Labrador
- List of designated places in Newfoundland and Labrador
- List of local service districts in Newfoundland and Labrador
- Turret Bay
