= Upper Burgeo =

Coordinates: 47°36′N 57°40′W

Upper Burgeo is an abandoned settlement in the La Poile District. It was located 3 – 4 km west of Burgeo on Cornelius Island. Burgeo, which still exists today, was then called Lower Burgeo.

- Latitude: 47° 35' 59.9" (47.6°) north
- Longitude: 57° 39' 54.6" (57.6652°) west

It was settled prior to 1796. There were people still living there in 1871, but there is no reference to Upper Burgeo in the 1921 Newfoundland census. Today, there are only a few cabins on Cornelius Island.

== See also ==
- List of communities in Newfoundland and Labrador
