= Bank Head =

Canadian farming and fishing settlement

Bank Head is a farming and fishing settlement in the Canadian province of Newfoundland and Labrador. It is just north of Journois.

Located on the south side of Bay St. George, it had one church in 1911. The Way office was established in 1887 and the first Waymaster was Ann Reilly. The population was 350 in 1911.

== See also ==
- List of communities in Newfoundland and Labrador
