= Upshall =

Upshall may refer to:

== People ==
- Eric Upshall (born 1951), Canadian politician
- Scottie Upshall (born 1983), Canadian ice hockey player

== Places ==
- Upshall Station, Newfoundland and Labrador locality
