= Osmond, Newfoundland and Labrador =

Osmond
- Unincorporated place
- Location within Newfoundland Location within Canada
- Coordinates: 47.624°N 59.261°W
- Country: Canada
- Province: Newfoundland and Labrador
- GNBC Code: AAQKN

Osmond is an unincorporated place in Newfoundland and Labrador, Canada. The settlement was a stop on the Newfoundland Railway.

== History ==
By the late 1800s, the coastal area between Cape Ray and Grand Bay West was occupied by about 100 settlers living in the tiny scattered communities of Big Barachois, Cape Barrisway (or Barachois Point), Dreadfall Point, Jerrett Point, Middle Barachois, Point Rosy, and Rocky Barachois. The settlers fished for cod in the local waters, and established farms, selling vegetables to fishing communities along the southwest coast of Newfoundland. After the Newfoundland Railway went through in 1897, the people in these settlements began moving closer to communities nearer the tracks, and by about 1930, most had resettled to a location near a railway siding at Barachois Point, which was renamed "Osmond" after a local family. Some small-scale farming and fishing still occurred, though local farmers faced competition from other communities who could now more easily ship their produce by rail, and most heads of households were employed as railway sectionmen, or as labourers at the railway terminal in Port aux Basques. Osmond had a population of 46 in 1936, and 43 in 1966. The population began to decline in the late 1960s, when most families moved to Grand Bay or Port aux Basques. Summer cottages were located here in the 1980s and 1990s.

== Geography ==
Osmond overlooks Cabot Strait on the southwest shore of the island of Newfoundland. It is within Subdivision H of Division No. 3.

== See also ==
- List of communities in Newfoundland and Labrador
