= Back Cove =

Back Cove may refer to various places in North America:

== Canada ==
- Back Cove, Baie Verte, Newfoundland and Labrador, a community on the Baie Verte Peninsula of the island of Newfoundland
- Back Cove, Bonavista, Newfoundland and Labrador, a cove on the Bonavista Peninsula known for fossil finds
- Back Cove, Burgeo, Newfoundland and Labrador, a community near Burgeo on the south shore of Newfoundland
- Back Cove, Fogo, Newfoundland and Labrador, a small fishing village on Fogo Island
- Back Cove, Labrador, Newfoundland and Labrador, a former hamlet on the Labrador Coast
- Back Cove, Twillingate, Newfoundland and Labrador, a community near Twillingate, Newfoundland and Labrador

== United States ==
- Back Cove (Maine), a nearly circular estuary basin on the northern side of the downtown district of Portland, Maine
