= Reefs Harbour-Shoal Cove West-New Ferolle =

Local Service District in Newfoundland and Labrador

New Ferrolle Peninsula light
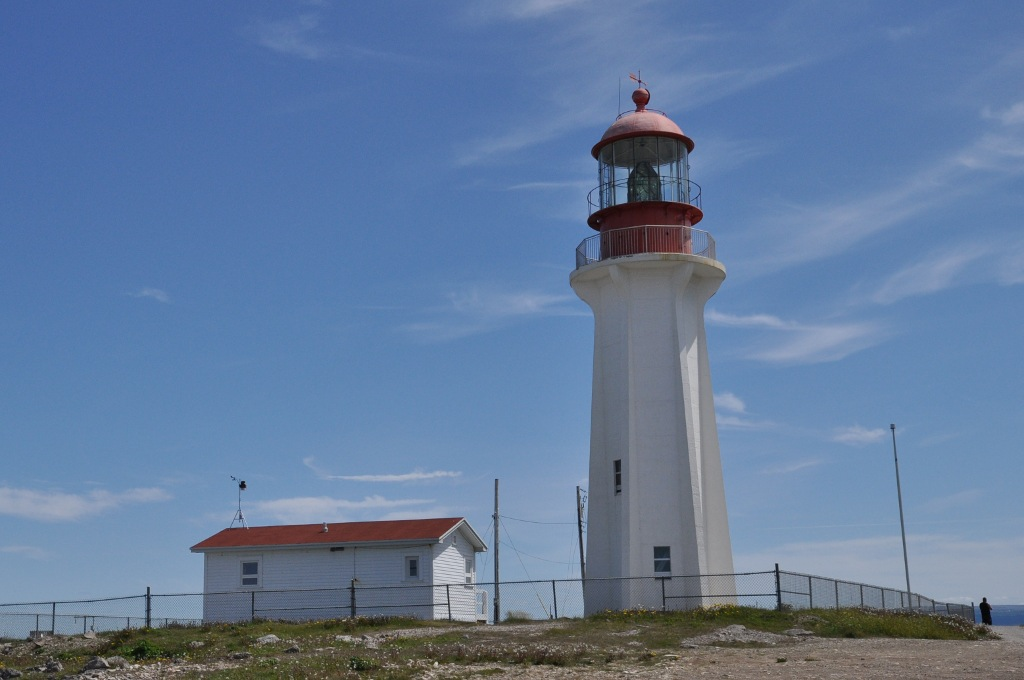
- Location: Reefs Harbour-Shoal Cove West-New Ferolle, Newfoundland and Labrador, Canada
- Coordinates: 51°01′21″N 57°05′44″W

Tower
- Constructed: 1913
- Construction: concrete (foundation), concrete (tower)
- Height: 19 m (62 ft)
- Shape: hexagonal prism tower with six ribs, balcony and lantern
- Markings: White (tower), red (lantern)
- Power source: mains electricity
- Operator: Canadian Coast Guard
- Heritage: recognized federal heritage building of Canada, heritage lighthouse
- Fog signal: 4s. blast every 56s.

Light
- Focal height: 27 m (89 ft)
- Lens: third order Fresnel lens
- Range: 20 nmi (37 km; 23 mi)
- Characteristic: Q(4) W 7.5s

Reefs Harbour-Shoal Cove West-New Ferolle is a local service district and designated place in the Canadian province of Newfoundland and Labrador. It is southwest of Anchor Point.

== Geography ==
Reefs Harbour-Shoal Cove West-New Ferolle is in Newfoundland within Subdivision C of Division No. 9. The area consists of three unincorporated communities – Reefs Harbour, Shoal Cove and New Ferolle – on the New Ferolle Peninsula near Port au Choix.

== Demographics ==
As a designated place in the 2016 Census of Population conducted by Statistics Canada, Reefs Harbour-Shoal Cove West-New Ferolle recorded a population of 100 living in 53 of its 67 total private dwellings, a change of -56.5% from its 2011 population of 230. With a land area of 11.94 km^{2} (4.61 sq mi), it had a population density of 8.4/km^{2} (21.7/sq mi) in 2016.

== Government ==
Reefs Harbour-Shoal Cove West-New Ferolle is a local service district (LSD) that is governed by a committee responsible for the provision of certain services to the community. The chair of the LSD committee is Gloria Tucker.

== See also ==
- List of communities in Newfoundland and Labrador
- List of designated places in Newfoundland and Labrador
- List of lighthouses in Canada
- List of local service districts in Newfoundland and Labrador
