= Monroe, Newfoundland and Labrador =

Community in Newfoundland and Labrador

Coordinates: 48.198°N 53.795°W

Location of Monroe in Newfoundland and Labrador

Monroe is a settlement in the Canadian province of Newfoundland and Labrador.

Monroe is situated on the inland waterway of Smith Sound, Trinity Bay. The community was named Monroe when the two settlements of Rocky Brook and Upper Rocky Brook amalgamated in 1912 and was named for the merchant Walter Stanley Monroe, of St. John's, who later became the Prime Minister of the Dominion of Newfoundland from 1924 to 1928.

Monroe was first settled in 1853 by the household of Henry and Patience (née Meagher) Stone and children.
