= Plate Cove East =

Coordinates: 48°31′00″N 53°29′00″W

Plate Cove East is a small community located in Bonavista Bay, Newfoundland and Labrador. It is part of the federal electoral riding of Bonavista—Gander—Grand Falls—Windsor. It was officially a town from 1960 until 2004. In 1966 it had a population of 237. In 2011 there were 89 inhabitants.

The town has a primarily Catholic population with some Anglicans. Some of the industries in the community include fishing and farming. There is a fishery nearby in Plate Cove West.

This little village has a large number of families named Philpott, or Philpot. A common family name found in Plate Cove West, Newfoundland and Labrador is Keough. The Keoughs are distant relatives of the Philpotts. There are also a number of Dooleys, Russells and Murphys.

Plate Cove East is also the repository of a number of unique folk songs. Many of these songs were collected in the 1970s. A come home year was set for July 2012.

== Demographics ==
Historical populations
Year	Pop.	±%
1961	214	—
1966	237	+10.7%
1971	209	−11.8%
1976	164	−21.5%
1981	172	+4.9%
1986	173	+0.6%
1991	145	−16.2%
1996	144	−0.7%
2001	120	−16.7%
2006	115	−4.2%
2011	89	−22.6%
2016	80	−10.1%
2021	78	−2.5%

== See also ==
- List of communities in Newfoundland and Labrador
