= Sandy Point, Newfoundland and Labrador =

Tidal island on the west coast of Newfoundland

Coordinates: 48°27′00″N 58°29′57″W

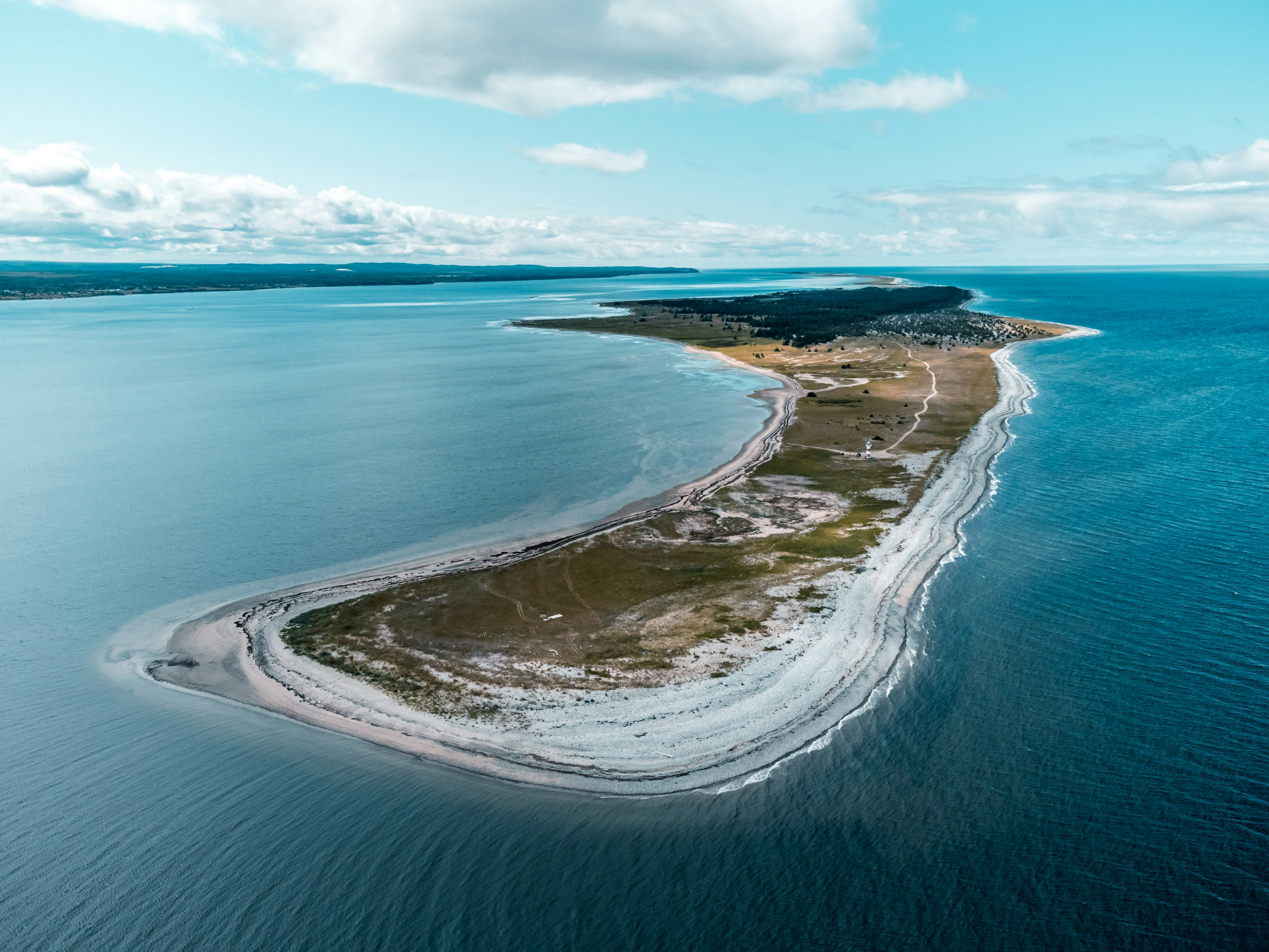
Aerial Photo of Sandy Point

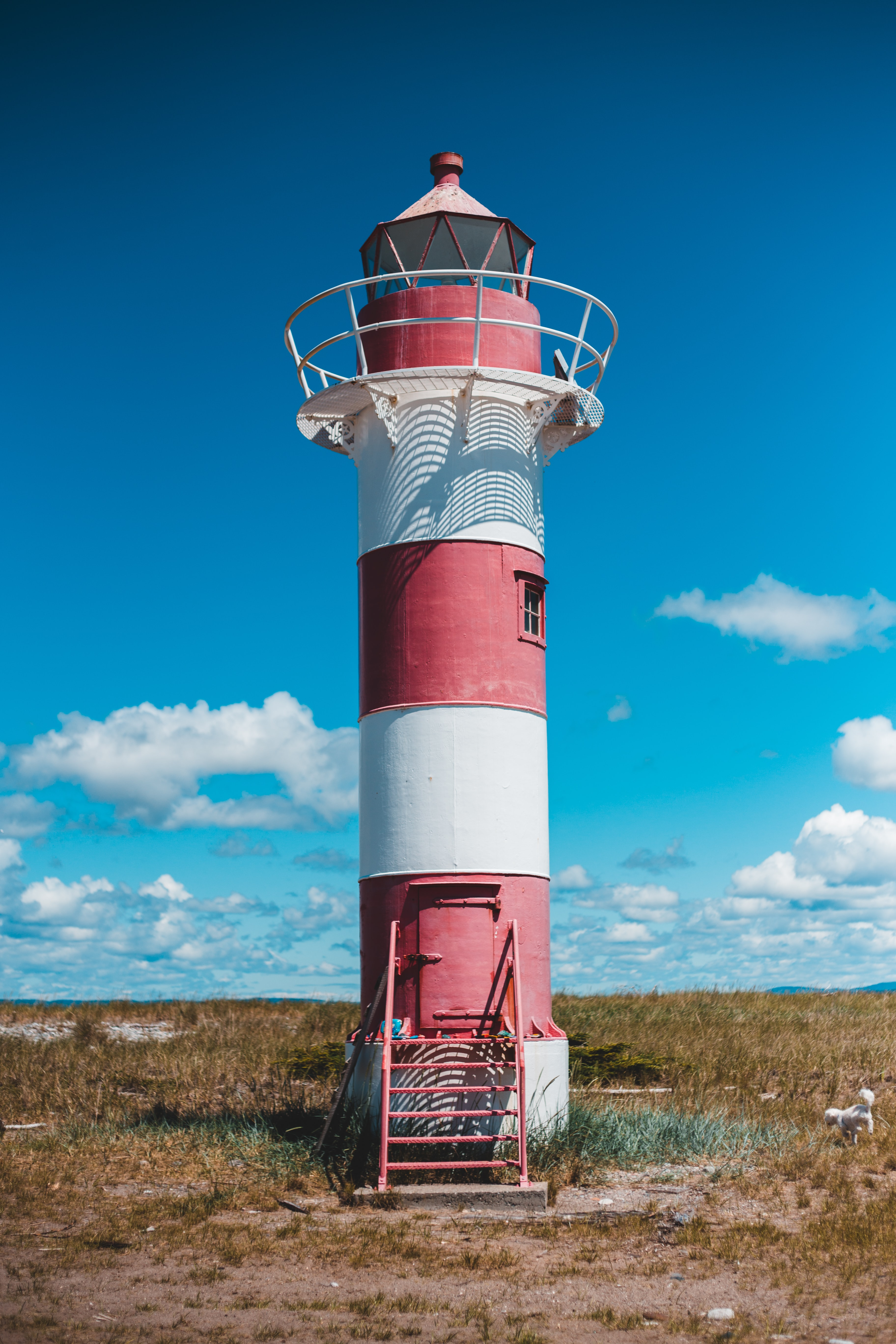
Lighthouse on Sandy Point

Sandy Point or Flat Island (as described by some provincial maps) was formerly a peninsula but is now an island on the west coast of Newfoundland which is gradually being transformed into a hidden island as a result of ocean storm-induced coastal erosion. Its former connecting isthmus is known as "The Gap" by locals after a severe winter storm during the 1960s breached the land bridge and created a gap. The island of Sandy Point was first coined a "hidden island" due to the extreme difficulty in spotting the barrier island on the horizon when approaching inner Bay St. George from the Gulf of St Lawrence by ship. This may have also served beneficial to "pirate" vessels looking to temporarily mask or hide from the regular trade route along the Gulf of St. Laurence River at the time on the lee side of Sandy Point where an anchorage was available, away from the prevailing winds. The fur trade was quite lucrative during this period, so it is somewhat conceivable that inner Bay St. George may have served as a tax or thief "hideaway" from the regular trade routes although this is somewhat speculative.

Sandy Point is now an abandoned former island community of the same name. Due to changing economic, social, and logistical circumstances it became more practical to relocate to the nearby mainland community of St. George's or elsewhere nearby. A scheduled railway connection began to supply goods that were previously unavailable to the island community.

The Sandy Point land bar leads or extends from an isthmus or land bridge from Flat Bay West in St. George's Bay. This coastal land bridge extends from Flat Bay West towards Stephenville Crossing and is about a total 7 km (4 mi) hike to the Sandy Point Lighthouse with about a 0.25 km (0 mi) intertidal barrier. The land bridge was severed in a severe storm on the 2nd of December, 1951, and was disconnected from the mainland until 2020, when a violent storm washed a connection of rocks back into the gap, causing a peninsula to be formed again.

== History ==
Sandy Point is thought to have been long inhabited by aboriginals, namely a Dorset culture, and later the Beothuk and Mi'kmaq nations, and was the hub of the St. George’s Bay fishery. The area was also a major port and supply centre for much of the west coast of Newfoundland.

Sandy Point was divided practically down the middle between Catholics and Anglicans. The westward end, where Catholics lived, was known as "up along". The Eastern portion, where the Anglicans lived, was "down along".

In the ensuing decades, Sandy Point became host to a small population of multi-cultural and multi-lingual residents including Mi'kmaq, English, Jersey, and French residents. Sandy Point also became known for a genetic defect among its population which was termed Allderdice syndrome, also known to locals in the surrounding area as "Sandy Point Syndrome".

The outport community of Sandy Point continued until a period after Newfoundland entered Confederation in 1949 whereupon the provincial government began a program of voluntary and forced resettlement of coastal communities.

In the case of Sandy Point, the provincial government gave financial enticements for residents to leave the community and move to nearby St. George's which was located on the Newfoundland Railway main line and would thus be cheaper to provide services to a concentrated population.

Sandy Point, which had been an important sea port for the western coast of Newfoundland, declined to the point where its last two residents were forced to abandon the community during the 1970s.

Today, the recently created island is completely uninhabited. Various levels of government are undertaking a process to create the territory as an historical site and conservation area for the numerous species of migratory birds which inhabit the island during the summer months; these include piping plovers, with the Sandy Point colony comprising between 15-30% of Newfoundland's overall plover population. The island hosts a diverse habitat ranging from tidal sandflats, beaches and sand dunes, saltmarshes, meadows, freshwater ponds, and some forested area, making for a unique landscape in the province. The island also has one of the most northerly and largest occurrences of Spartina salt marshes in eastern North America.

Sandy Point, Newfoundland appears to be somewhat unusual in that it may be the most Northerly Barrier Island in Eastern Canada. (Unconfirmed) The island exhibits some unique flora and fauna not common within Eastern Canada. Likewise, the inner bay of Sandy Point exhibits eelgrass beds which may provide means as nursery grounds for many fish species but also exhibits a deep water outer trench directly behind the island which also may serve of some particular value to other fish species or marine mammals.
