= Little Ridge =

Coordinates: 47.549°N 53.640°W

Location of Little Ridge in Newfoundland and Labrador

Little Ridge is a former settlement in Newfoundland and Labrador. It was located on the Avalon Peninsula near to Thornlea and Bellevue.
