= Mint Brook =

Settlement in Newfoundland and Labrador, Canada

- Former settlement
- Interactive map of Mint Brook
- Coordinates: 48°43′30″N 54°14′56″W
- Country: Canada
- Province: Newfoundland and Labrador
- Region: Bonavista Bay
- Nearby town: Gambo

Mint Brook was a settlement in Newfoundland and Labrador near Gambo. It is generally recognized as the first 'inland' settlement on the island and during its existence was very much a sawmill/logging community.

Joseph R. Smallwood (December 24, 1900 - December 17, 1991), Newfoundland's first premier, was born in the settlement of Mint Brook.
