= St. Carol's, Newfoundland and Labrador =

Settlement in Newfoundland and Labrador, Canada

Coordinates: 51.3767°N 55.5056°W

Location of St. Carols in Newfoundland and Labrador

St. Carols is a settlement in the Canadian province of Newfoundland and Labrador.
