= Pines Cove =

Settlement in Canada

Coordinates: 51.374°N 56.602°W

Location of Pines Cove in Newfoundland and Labrador

Pines Cove, or Pine Cove, is a settlement in Newfoundland and Labrador.

The settlement is home to the Pine Cove Gold Mine, an open pit gold mine owned by Maritime Resources Corporation. This gold mine is part of the Point Rousse Project in the nearby town of Baie Verte.
