= Gallants =

Coordinates: 48.7034°N 58.2353°W

- Town
- Interactive map of Gallants
- Country: Canada
- Province: Newfoundland and Labrador
- Incorporated: 1966

Population (2021)
  - Total: 50
- Time zone: UTC-3:30 (Newfoundland Time)
  - Summer (DST): UTC-2:30 (Newfoundland Daylight)
- Area code: 709
- Highways: Route 402

Gallants is located northeast of Stephenville, Newfoundland and Labrador, Canada. It was created as a Local Government Community on August 16, 1966.

== Demographics ==
In the 2021 Census of Population conducted by Statistics Canada, Gallants had a population of 50 living in 33 of its 128 total private dwellings, a change of 0% from its 2016 population of 50. With a land area of 6.33 km^{2} (2.44 sq mi), it had a population density of 7.9/km^{2} (20.5/sq mi) in 2021.

== See also ==
- List of cities and towns in Newfoundland and Labrador
