= The Motion =

Settlement in Canada

Coordinates: 47°31′54″N 53°17′45″W

The Motion is a settlement located south of Bay Roberts, Newfoundland and Labrador. It is part of the town of Clarke's Beach.

== See also ==
- List of communities in Newfoundland and Labrador
