= Piccaire, Newfoundland and Labrador =

Coordinates: 47°37′N 55°56′W

Piccaire was a small settlement located on Long Island, Hermitage Bay, just west of Gaultois, Newfoundland and Labrador. It had a population of 75 in 1956.

== See also ==
- List of communities in Newfoundland and Labrador
