= La Manche Mines =

Mining community in Newfoundland and Labrador, Canada

Coordinates: 47.691°N 53.939°W

Location of La Manche Mines in Newfoundland and Labrador

La Manche Mines was a settlement in Newfoundland and Labrador. It was located southeast of Arnold's Cove and near to Rantem. It had a population of 23 in 1941 and last recorded inhabitants in the mid-20th century, the total being 1 (one).

The area was formerly a mining site, reportedly due to its large deposits of lead, that was abandoned many years ago. It is not a populated community.
