= Angelbrook =

- Unincorporated community
- Country: Canada
- Province: Newfoundland and Labrador
- Time zone: UTC-3:30 (Newfoundland Time)
  - Summer (DST): UTC-2:30 (Newfoundland Daylight)
- Area code: 709

Angelbrook is a former Canadian community in the province of Newfoundland and Labrador.

It is located in the Number 7 Census Division and became part of Glovertown in 1987. It is more properly known as Angle Brook.

In 1935, the town was home to 56 residents.

== See also ==
- List of communities in Newfoundland and Labrador
