= Deadman's Cove =

Settlement in Newfoundland and Labrador, Canada

Coordinates: 51°15′12″N 56°47′00″W

Deadmans Cove or Dead Man Cove is a small settlement in Newfoundland and Labrador, Canada. It is located northeast of Anchor Point, Newfoundland.

== See also ==
- List of communities in Newfoundland and Labrador
