= Eddies Cove East =

Coordinates: 51.249°N 56.790°W

Eddies Cove East is an unincorporated fishing community located northeast of Anchor Point in the Strait of Belle Isle of Newfoundland, Canada.

Phillip Coates, a Somerset fisherman, and his wife Sarah Duncan, were the first settlers of Eddies Cove East. The first official census in 1869 records one family with ten children.

The fishing season there is relatively short because of severe ice and fog conditions. Herring and cod have been the main species fished. The shrimp and scallop fishery, with its longer season, has been prosecuted since 1970. Logging and saw milling have provided supplementary income, and the community produces a good quantity of vegetables for local use.

In the late 1980s, Eddies Cove East's population reached an all-time high of 128 people. Today, Eddies Cove East has a population of just 80 permanent residents. There is a post office and a government wharf there. Due to the lack of employment families have been forced to leave this community in search of work. Many live in Alberta for most of the year and return home when the fishery reopens each year.

== See also ==
- List of communities in Newfoundland and Labrador
