= Halls Town, Newfoundland and Labrador =

Coordinates: 47°32′15″N 53°19′23″W

Halls Town is a neighbourhood in Newfoundland and Labrador, Canada.

It is part of the town of North River, southwest of Bay Roberts. It had a population of 320 in 1956.

== See also ==
- List of communities in Newfoundland and Labrador
