= Ship Cove-Lower Cove-Jerry's Nose =

Community in Newfoundland and Labrador, Canada

Coordinates: 48°31′32.1″N 59°0′17″W

Ship Cove-Lower Cove-Jerry's Nose is a local service district and designated place in the Canadian province of Newfoundland and Labrador.

== History ==
From the 1970s to present a major limestone quarry began operating at Lower Cove employing 30-40 people.

== Geography ==
Ship Cove-Lower Cove-Jerry's Nose is in Newfoundland within Subdivision E of Division No. 4. It is west of Stephenville along the southern coastline of the Port au Port Peninsula on Route 460. It consists of the three adjacent unincorporated fishing communities of Ship Cove, Lower Cove and Jerry's Nose.

== Demographics ==
As a designated place in the 2021 Census of Population conducted by Statistics Canada, Ship Cove-Lower Cove-Jerry's Nose recorded a population of 327 living in 189 of its 210 total private dwellings, a change of -15.4% from its 2016 population of 382. With a land area of 17.93 km^{2} (6.92 sq mi), it had a population density of 21.3/km^{2} (55.2/sq mi) in 2016.

== Government ==
Ship Cove-Lower Cove-Jerry's Nose is a local service district (LSD) that is governed by a committee responsible for the provision of certain services to the community. The chair of the LSD committee is Andrew Campbell.

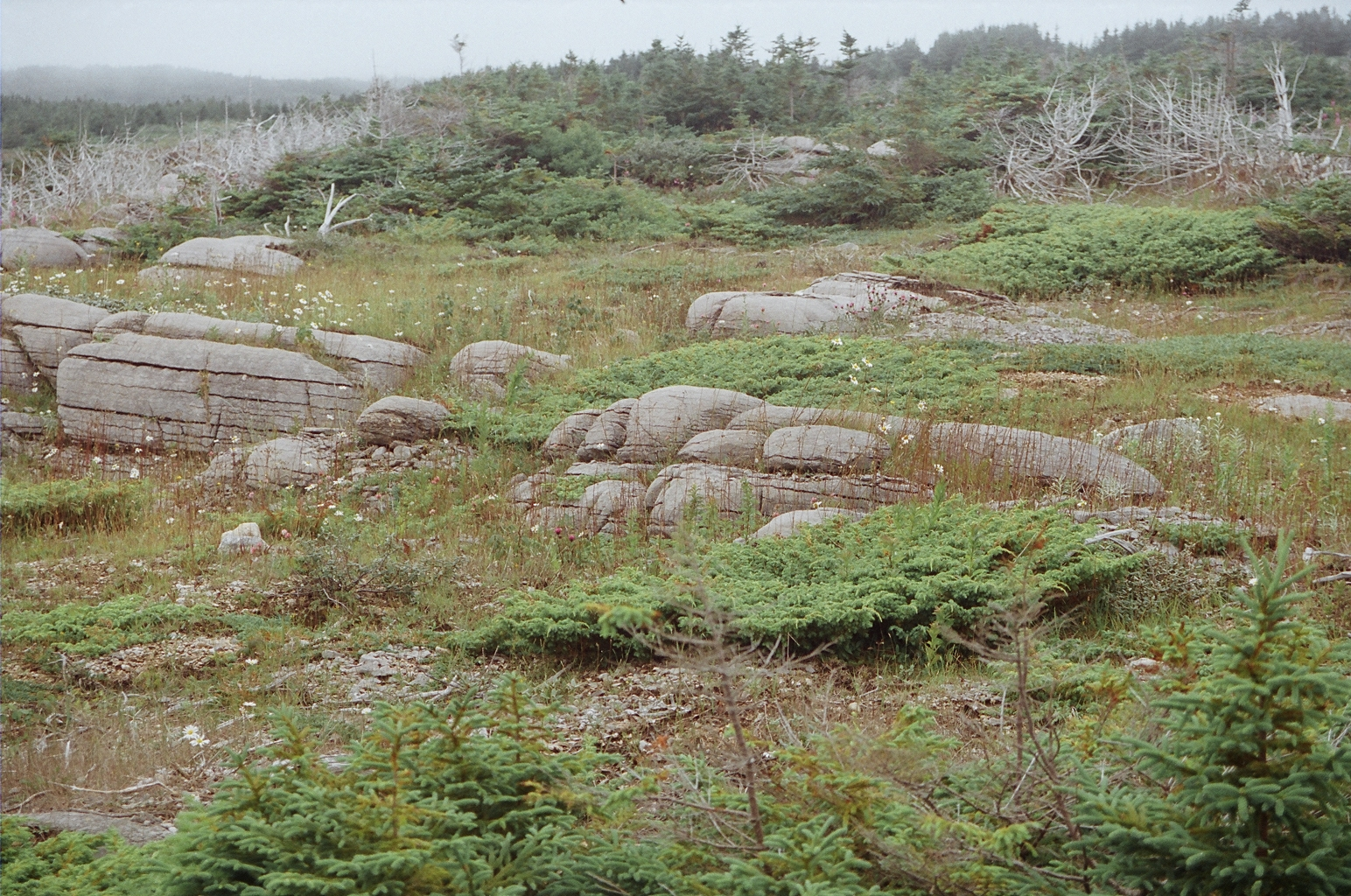

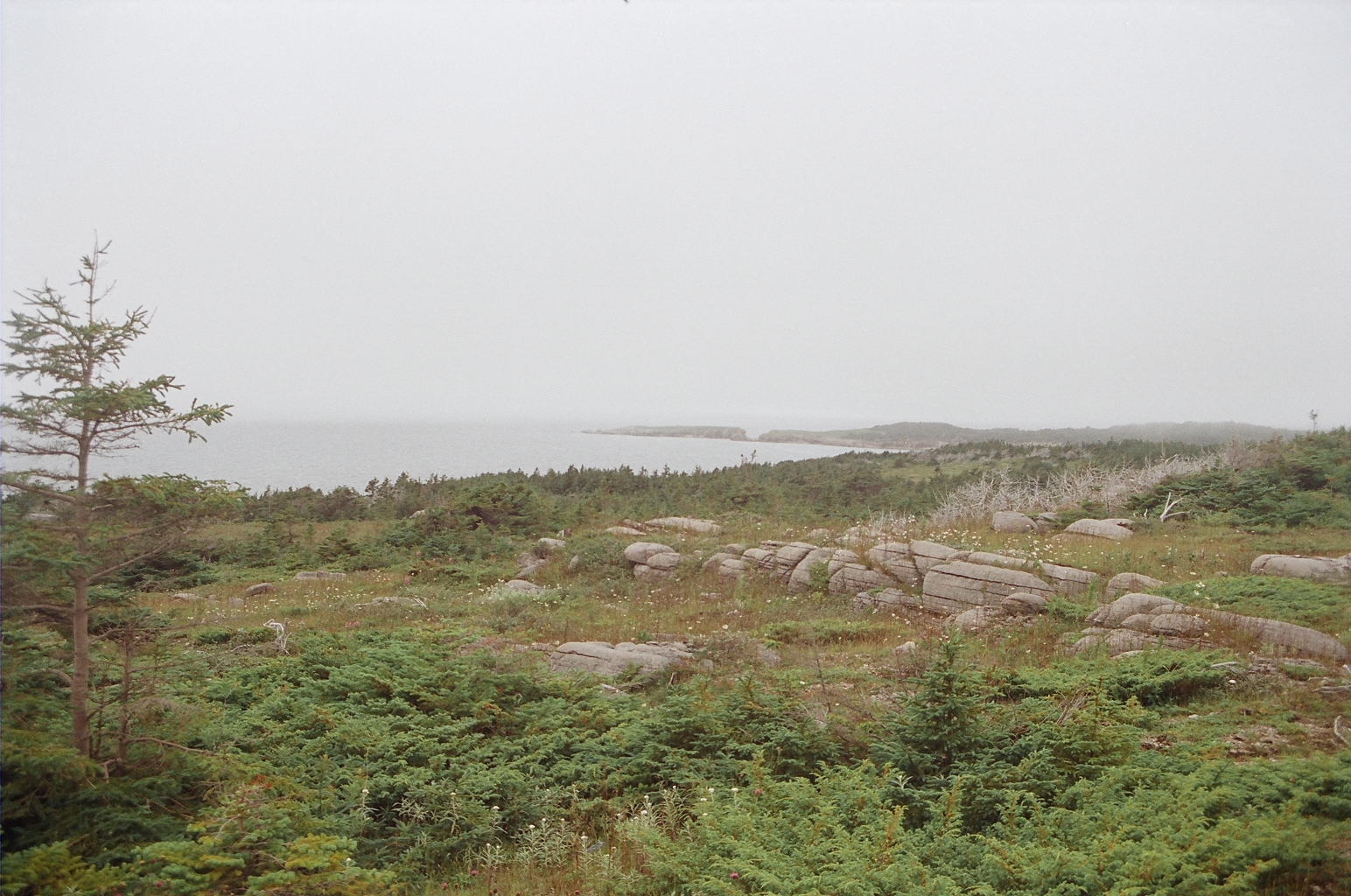

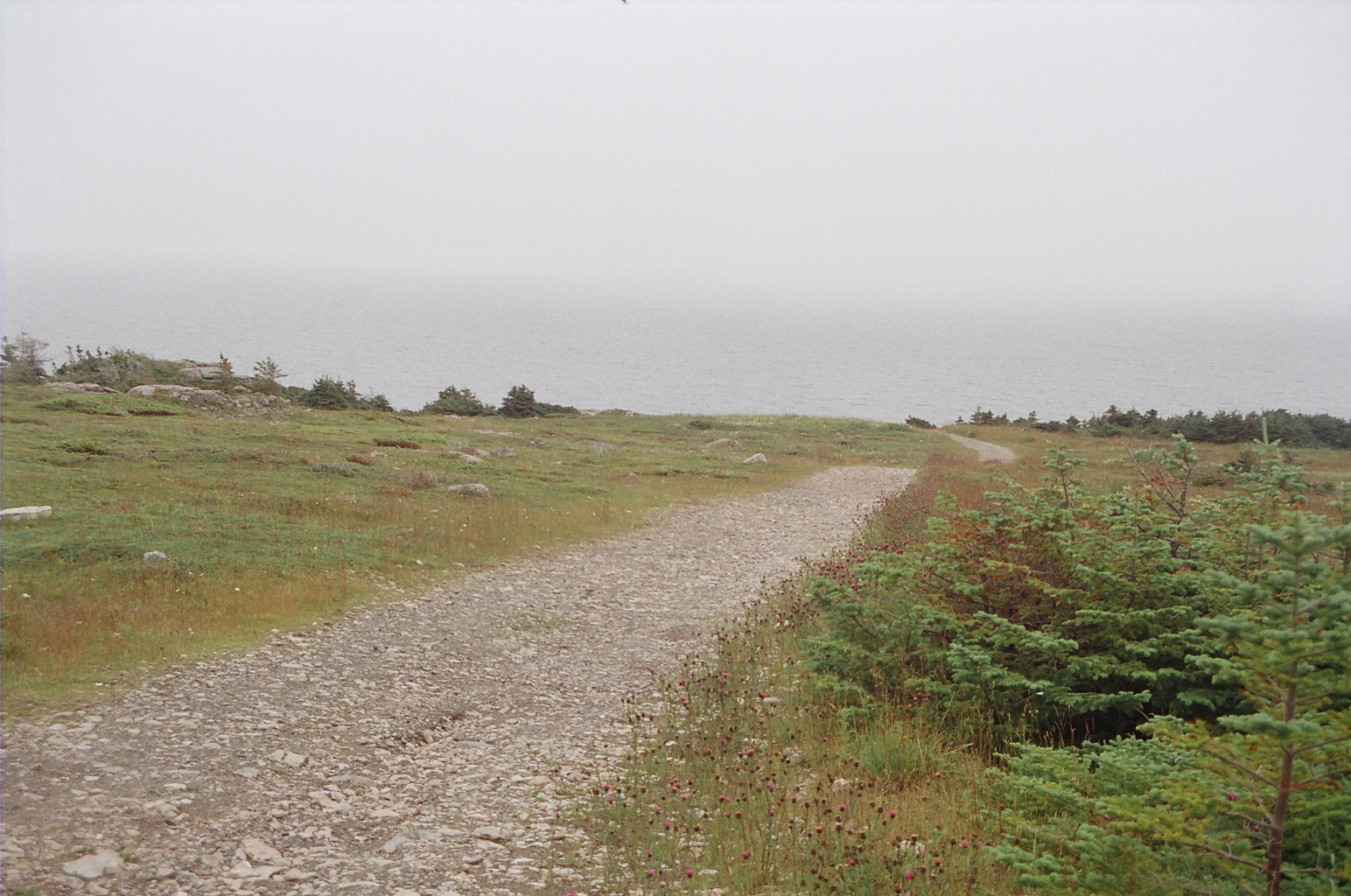

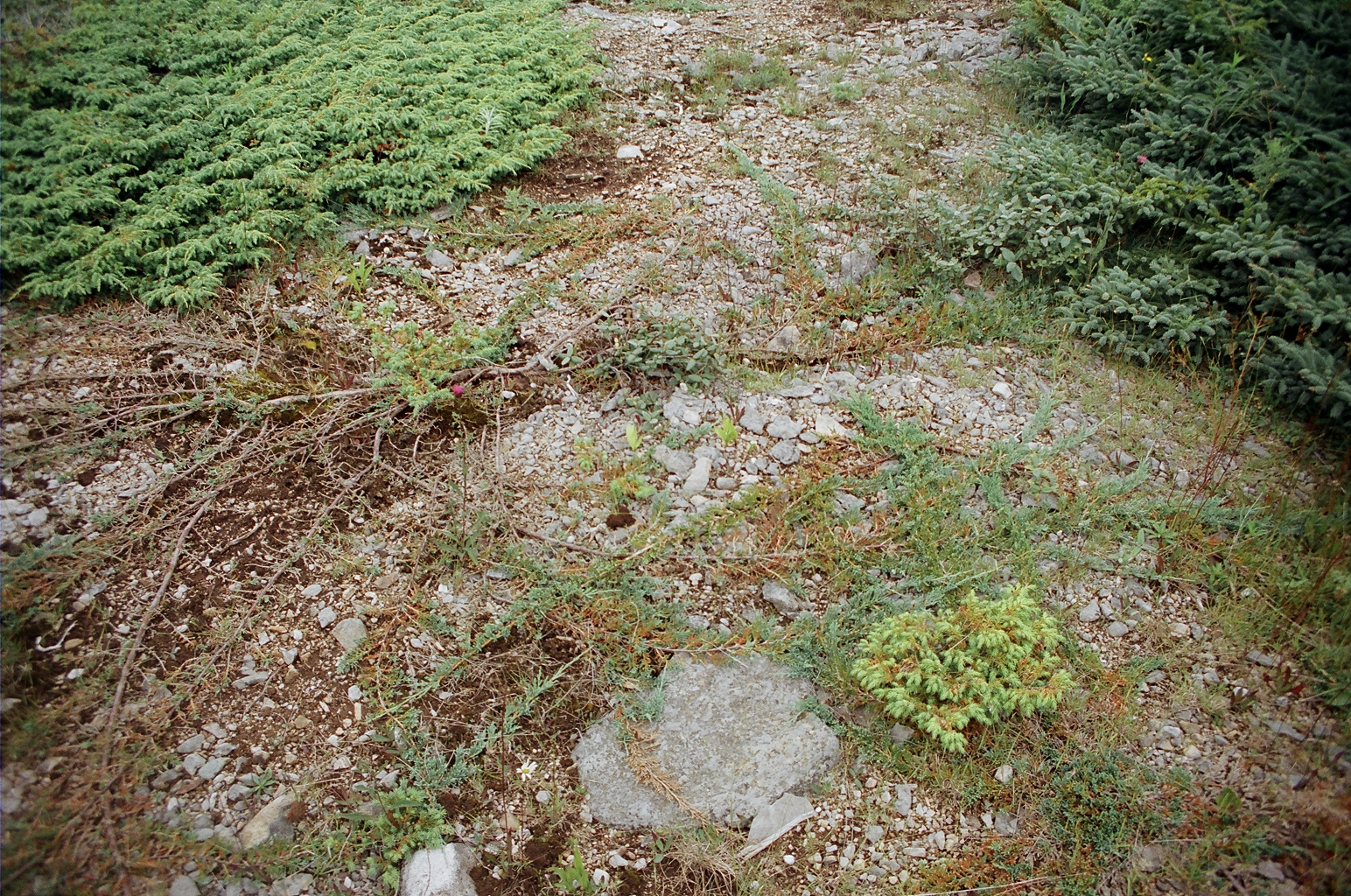

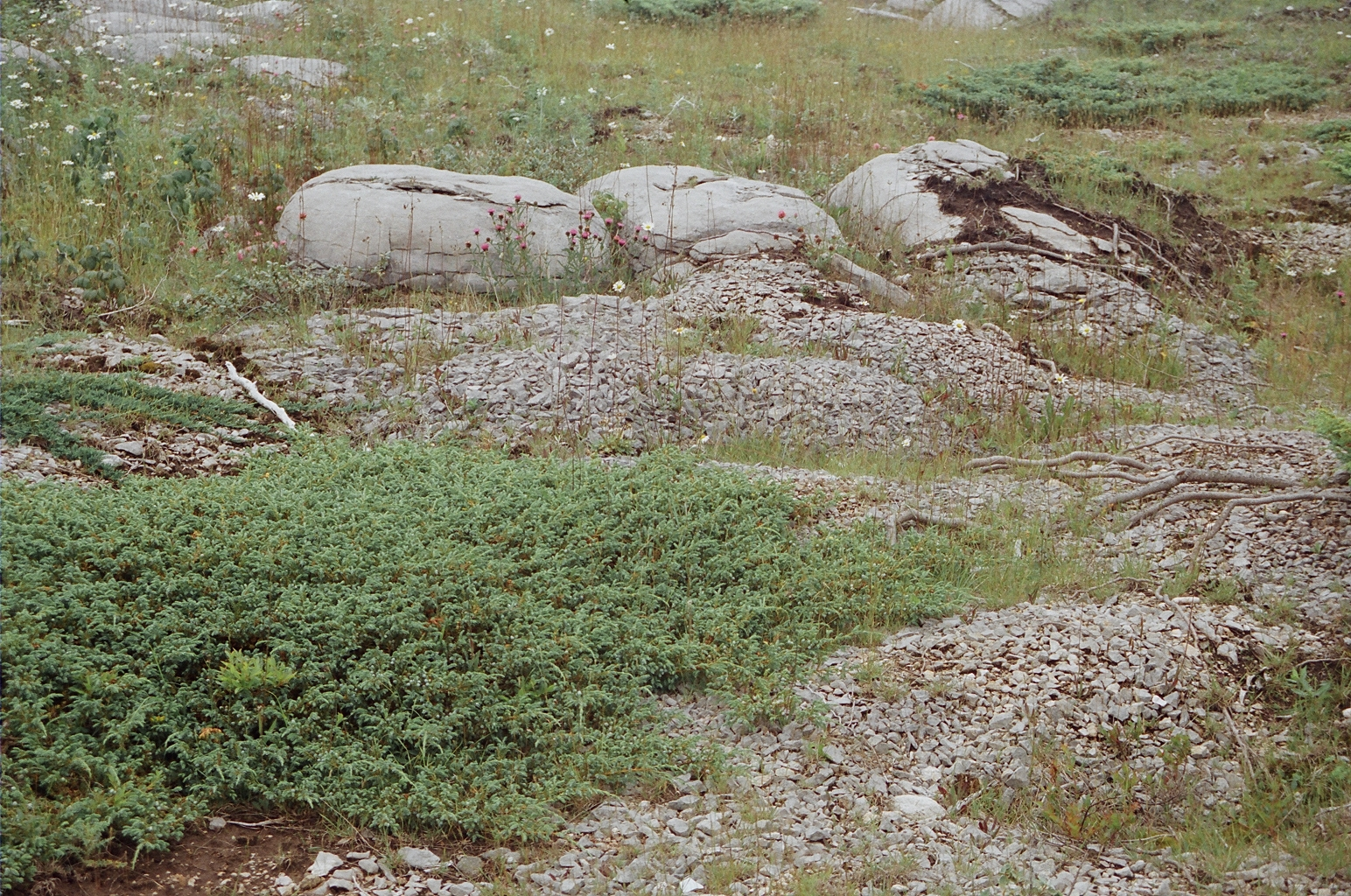

== See also ==
- List of communities in Newfoundland and Labrador
- List of designated places in Newfoundland and Labrador
- List of local service districts in Newfoundland and Labrador
