= Barr'd Harbour =

Settlement in Newfoundland and Labrador, Canada

Coordinates: 50°48′44″N 57°03′18″W

Barr'd Harbour is a small settlement located northeast of Pointe Riche. The mail office was closed on September 13, 1966.

== See also ==
- List of communities in Newfoundland and Labrador
