= Molliers =

Coordinates: 47.103°N 55.634°W

Location of Molliers in Newfoundland and Labrador

Molliers is a settlement in Newfoundland and Labrador. After suffering a steady population decline over several decades, Molliers was no longer reported separately in the census returns (Subdivision 2H) after 1986, but continues to exist although mainly as a summer retreat whilst retaining a small permanent population. Nearby Grand Beach and L'Anse au Loup have seen a relatively recent slight resurgence in population, as has the 'remainder' or 'between communities' population of this subdivision.
