= Newfoundland and Labrador Route 402 =

Highway in Newfoundland and Labrador, Canada

Route 402
- Gallants Road

Route information
- Maintained by Newfoundland and Labrador Department of Transportation and Infrastructure
- Length: 9 km (5.6 mi)

Major junctions
- South end: Route 1 (TCH) near Corner Brook
- North end: Main Road in Gallants

Location
- Country: Canada
- Province: Newfoundland and Labrador

Highway system
- Highways in Newfoundland and Labrador
| ← Route 401 | → Route 403 |

Route 402, also known as Gallants Road, is a minor highway in the Canadian province of Newfoundland and Labrador. The highway is located about 40 kilometres (25 mi) southwest of the city of Corner Brook, approximately 30 minutes by car. The route's eastern terminus is Route 1 (Trans-Canada Highway), and its western terminus at the community of Gallants, located 9 kilometres (5.6 mi) from Route 1. Although no directional signage on Route 1 before the intersection in either direction depict Route 402, but according to some provincial government road maps (as early as the 1980s), Route 402 is the official name of the highway.

== Major intersections ==
| Location | km | mi | Destinations | Notes |
|---|---|---|---|---|
| | 0.0 | 0.0 | Route 1 (TCH) – Corner Brook, Port aux Basques | Southern terminus |
| Gallants | 9 | 5.6 | Main Road | End of provincial maintenance; northern terminus; road continues as Main Road |
1.000 mi = 1.609 km; 1.000 km = 0.621 mi
