= Lake Siding =

Settlement in Canada

Coordinates: 49°09′N 57°28′W

Lake Siding is a settlement located south west of Deer Lake, Newfoundland and Labrador, Canada. It had a population of 146 in 1951, but has been a part of the greater Deer Lake area for many years and no longer reports separately.

== See also ==
- List of communities in Newfoundland and Labrador
