= Plate Cove West =

Coordinates: 48°30′00″N 53°30′00″W

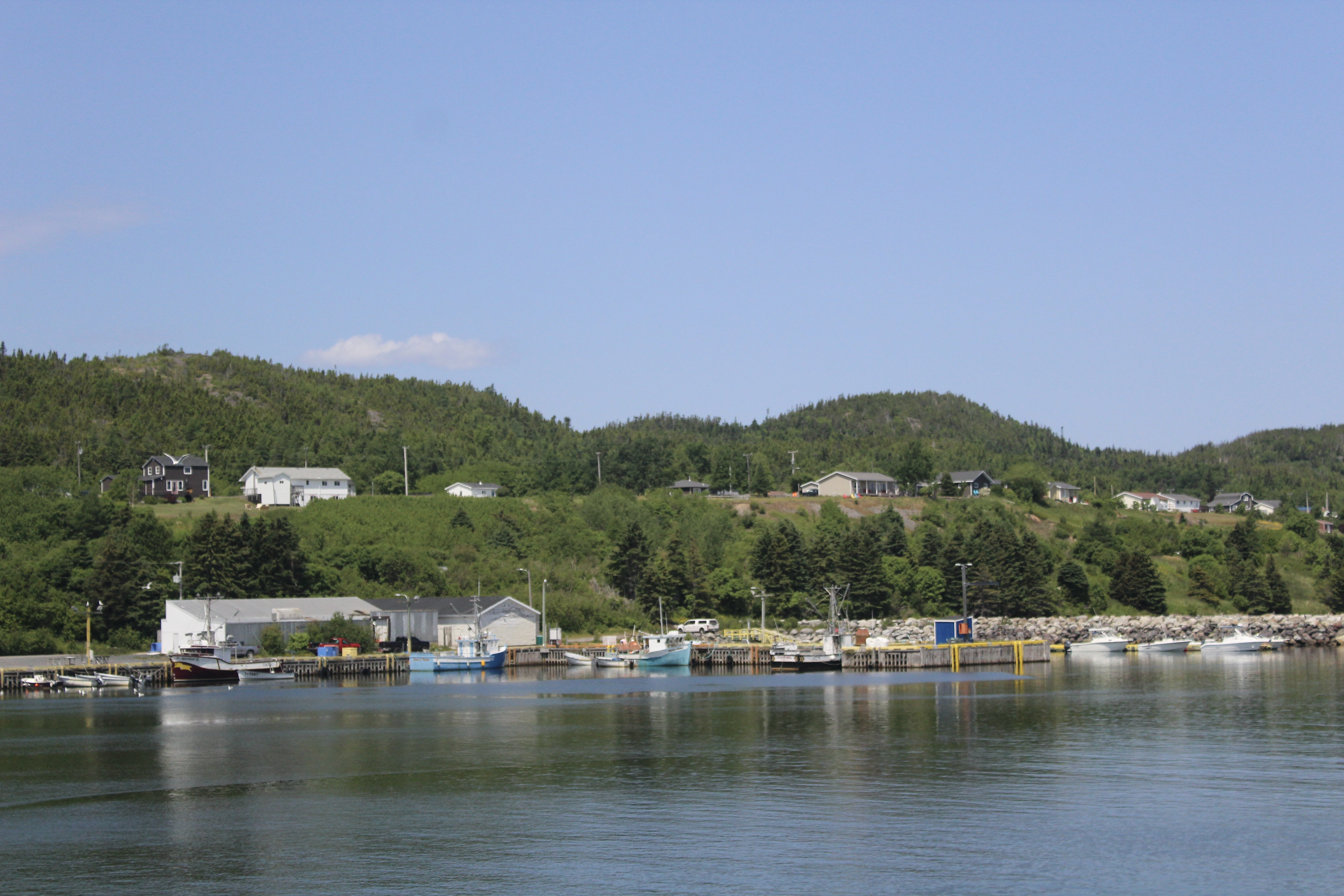
Plate Cove West

Plate Cove West is a village on the Bonavista Peninsula of Newfoundland, Canada. It borders Plate Cove East and is located about 30 km west of Catalina. The population in this unincorporated community was 174 residents as of 2010.

Most residents are employed by the local fish plant or as fishermen. The most common family names in the community are Furlong, Philpott, Keough, Fennell and Walsh. The first postmistress was Catherine Jane Walsh.

It is rumored that the harbour is shaped like a dinner bowl or plate, giving it the name of 'Plate Cove.' In the small village there is only one store, 'Fennell's Atlantic Grocery,' and a fish plant 'Furlong Brothers Ltd.'

Plate Cove is known for its annual St. Patrick's Day concert presented at the local community center, located between the east and west side of the harbour. This event is organized by locals and includes skits and songs for all to enjoy.

Historical populations
Year	Pop.	±%
1961	228	—
1966	255	+11.8%
1971	308	+20.8%
1976	284	−7.8%
1981	302	+6.3%
1986	307	+1.7%
1991	322	+4.9%
1996	210	−34.8%
2001	203	−3.3%
2006	175	−13.8%
2011	175	+0.0%
2016	190	+8.6%
2021	191	+0.5%

== See also ==
- List of communities in Newfoundland and Labrador
