= Villa Marie =

Human settlement in Newfoundland and Labrador, Canada

Coordinates: 47°17′59″N 53°51′38″W

Location of Villa Marie in Newfoundland

Villa Marie was a settlement in Newfoundland, Canada. It began as a quarry for Silica that operated from 1968 to 1988. It was located northeast of Placentia, along the C.N.R. tracks. It is now part of the Town of Placentia.

== See also ==
- List of communities in Newfoundland and Labrador
