= Long Island (Hermitage Bay, Newfoundland) =

- Location within Newfoundland

Geography
- Location: Atlantic Ocean
- Coordinates: 47°38′45″N 55°58′54″W

Administration
- Canada
- Province: Newfoundland and Labrador
- Largest settlement: Gaultois

Long Island is a large, triangular-shaped island on the north side of Hermitage Bay, Newfoundland and Labrador, Canada.

Presently, only one inhabited settlement remains on the island, though several abandoned and resettled communities can be found along its coast, including Piccaire and Little Bay. The town of Gaultois is located in a small cove near the eastern extreme of the island, and can be reached by passenger ferry several times daily.
