= Bobby's Cove =

Coordinates: 51.392°N 55.564°W

Location of Bobby's Cove in Newfoundland and Labrador

Bobby's Cove is a settlement in Newfoundland and Labrador.

It is part of the broader Notre Dame Bay, and has been host to Targa Newfoundland.
