= Goose Cove, Hare Bay, Newfoundland and Labrador =

Coordinates: 51.306°N 55.633°W

Location of Goose Cove in Newfoundland and Labrador

Goose Cove is a settlement in Newfoundland and Labrador. It is a neighbourhood of the town of Goose Cove East.
