= The Thicket, Newfoundland and Labrador =

Coordinates: 47°39′03″N 53°15′32″W

The Thicket is a settlement located north of Bay Roberts, Newfoundland and Labrador. It is part of the town of Harbour Grace.

The population was 61 in 1951; 65 in 1956.

== See also ==
- List of communities in Newfoundland and Labrador
