= Bailey's Point =

Coordinates: 49.488°N 57.926°W

Bailey's Point is a Canadian hamlet in the province of Newfoundland and Labrador.

It is located on the western arm of Bonne Bay.

== See also ==
- List of communities in Newfoundland and Labrador
