= Harbour Round, Newfoundland and Labrador =

Settlement in Newfoundland and Labrador, Canada

Coordinates: 49°55′00″N 55°44′00″W

Harbour Round is a designated place in the Canadian province of Newfoundland and Labrador. It is east of Baie Verte.

== History ==
The first postmistress in 1961 was Mrs. George Skinner.

== Geography ==
Harbour Round is in Newfoundland within Subdivision A of Division No. 8.

== Demographics ==
As a designated place in the 2016 Census of Population conducted by Statistics Canada, Harbour Round recorded a population of 188 living in 78 of its 93 total private dwellings, a change of -11.3% from its 2011 population of 212. With a land area of 1.83 km^{2} (0.71 sq mi), it had a population density of 102.7/km^{2} (266.1/sq mi) in 2016.

== Attractions ==
Harbour Round has fishing and boating activities. It also has a walking trail that leads to a lookout.

== Government ==
There is no town council in Harbour Round. The only thing provided by the community is garbage collection. There is a small fire station and a local store

== Education ==
All students in Harbour Round attend high school and elementary school in La Scie. The nearest medical facility is located in Baie Verte which is located 35;km from the community.

== See also ==
- List of communities in Newfoundland and Labrador
- List of designated places in Newfoundland and Labrador
