= Turret Bay =

Bay in Newfoundland and Labrador, Canada

Coordinates: 50.833°N 57.231°W

Turret Bay is a natural bay off the island of Newfoundland in the province of Newfoundland and Labrador, Canada.
