= Round Harbour, Fogo, Newfoundland and Labrador =

Coordinates: 49°52′N 55°40′W

Round Harbor was a small settlement with only two families in 1864. It was located on Fogo Island, Newfoundland and Labrador.

Today there are 22 houses, with four families. There are no schools, stores, medics, police, etc. Residents dispose of their own garbage and have private water sources. There was an Anglican church, with services once a month.

== See also ==
- List of communities in Newfoundland and Labrador
