= Upshall Station =

Locality in Newfoundland and Labrador, Canada

Coordinates: 47°40′00″N 53°53′57″W

Upshall Station is a settlement in Newfoundland and Labrador located south east of Swift Current.

== See also ==
- List of communities in Newfoundland and Labrador
