= Goose Cove, Trinity Bay, Newfoundland and Labrador =

Settlement in Newfoundland and Labrador, Canada

Coordinates: 48.367°N 53.380°W

Location of Goose Cove in Newfoundland and Labrador

Goose Cove is a settlement situated between Dunfield and Trinity in the Canadian province of Newfoundland and Labrador.
