= Petite Forte, Newfoundland and Labrador =

Petite Forte
- Local service district / designated place
- Location within Newfoundland
- Coordinates: 47°24′00″N 54°40′00″W
- Country: Canada
- Province: Newfoundland and Labrador

Population (2021)
  - Total: 71
- Highways: Route 215; Ferry to South East Bight

Petite Forte (/pɛtiːfɒrt/ pet-ee-FORT; French: Petit Forte) is a local service district and designated place in the Canadian province of Newfoundland and Labrador. It is on Placentia Bay and is connected by road via Route 215 (Petite Forte Road). Petite Forte is located on the Burin Peninsula which is on the southeast coast of the island of Newfoundland in the province of Newfoundland and Labrador. It fought attempts by the government in the 1960s to resettle. Petite Forte has a population of 69 according to the 2021 census.

The ferry MV Marine Coaster III has a port in Petite Forte and services the isolated outport of South East Bight.

== Geography ==
Petite Forte is in Newfoundland within Subdivision C of Division No. 2.

== Demographics ==
As a designated place in the 2021 Census of Population conducted by Statistics Canada, Petite Forte recorded a population of 71 living in 25 of its 47 total private dwellings, a change of 24.6% from its 2016 population of 57. With a land area of 5.56 km^{2} (2.15 sq mi), it had a population density of 10.3/km^{2} (26.6/sq mi) in 2016.

== Government ==
Petite Forte is a local service district (LSD) that is governed by a committee responsible for the provision of certain services to the community. The chair of the LSD committee is Kevin Hefferan.

== See also ==
- List of designated places in Newfoundland and Labrador
- List of local service districts in Newfoundland and Labrador
- Newfoundland outport
- South East Bight
