= Round Harbour, Fortune Bay, Newfoundland and Labrador =

Coordinates: 47°36′56″N 56°00′23″W

Round Harbour was a small settlement in Fortune Bay circa 1864. It is located north west of Harbour Breton.

== See also ==
- List of communities in Newfoundland and Labrador
