= Grand Bay West =

Settlement in Newfoundland and Labrador, Canada

Coordinates: 47.596°N 59.183°W

Location of Grand Bay West in Newfoundland and Labrador

Grand Bay West is a settlement in the Canadian province of Newfoundland and Labrador.
