= Boat Harbour, Newfoundland and Labrador =

Settlement in Newfoundland and Labrador

Coordinates: 47.431°N 54.842°W

Location of Boat Harbour in Newfoundland and Labrador

Boat Harbour is a settlement in Newfoundland and Labrador, Canada. The community had a population of 73 in the 2021 census.
