= Tizzard's Harbour, Newfoundland and Labrador =

Local service district in Canada

Coordinates: 49°35′41″N 54°48′13″W

Location of Tizzard's Harbour in Newfoundland

Tizzard's Harbour is a local service district and designated place in the Canadian province of Newfoundland and Labrador.

== Geography ==
Tizzard's Harbour is in Newfoundland within Subdivision H of Division No. 8.

== Demographics ==
As a designated place in the 2016 Census of Population conducted by Statistics Canada, Tizzard's Harbour recorded a population of 55 living in 28 of its 62 total private dwellings, a change of 3.8% from its 2011 population of 53. With a land area of 1.83 km^{2} (0.71 sq mi), it had a population density of 30.1/km^{2} (77.8/sq mi) in 2016.

== Government ==
Tizzard's Harbour is a local service district (LSD) that is governed by a committee responsible for the provision of certain services to the community. The chair of the LSD committee is Rosemary Boyd.

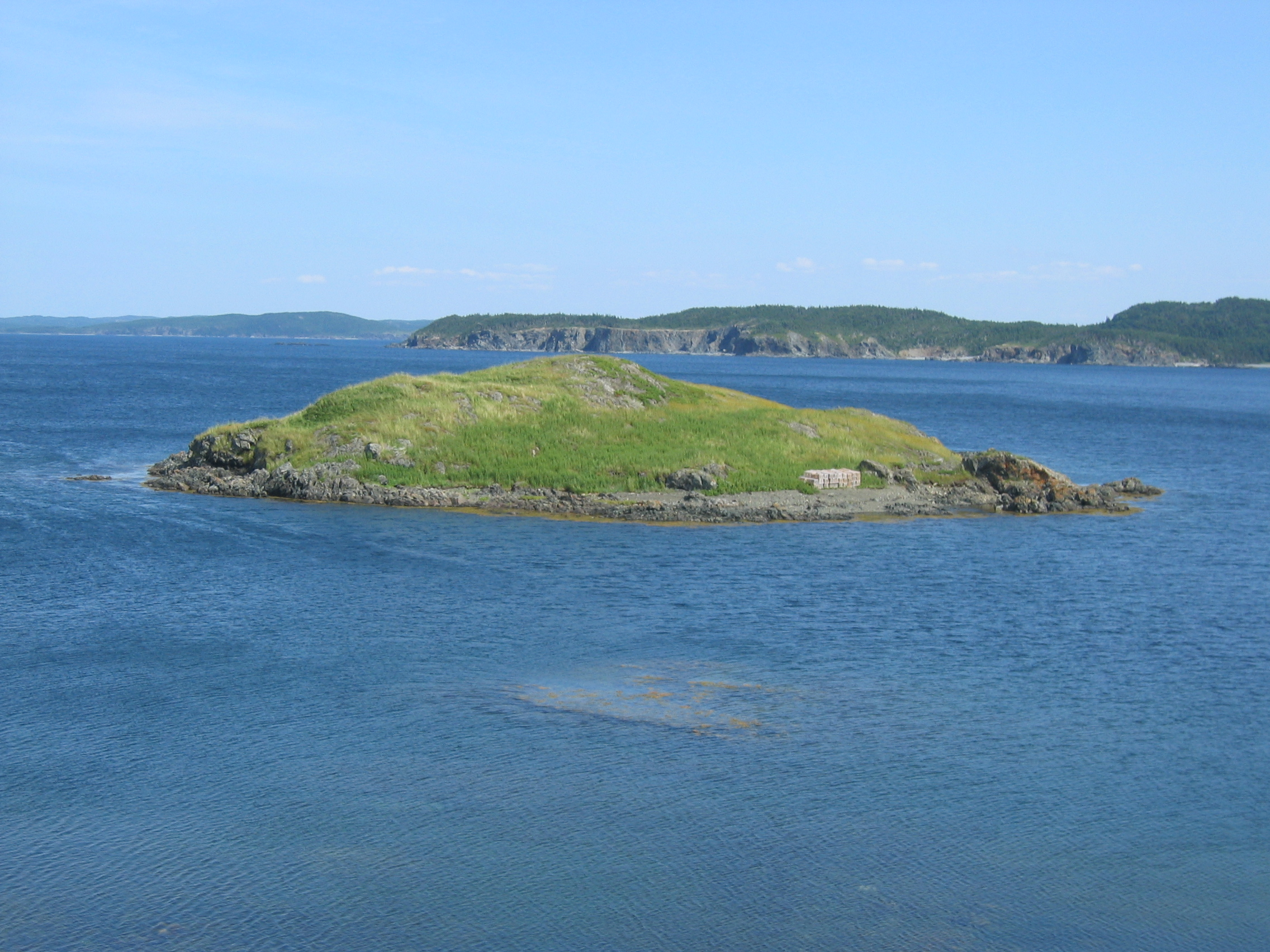

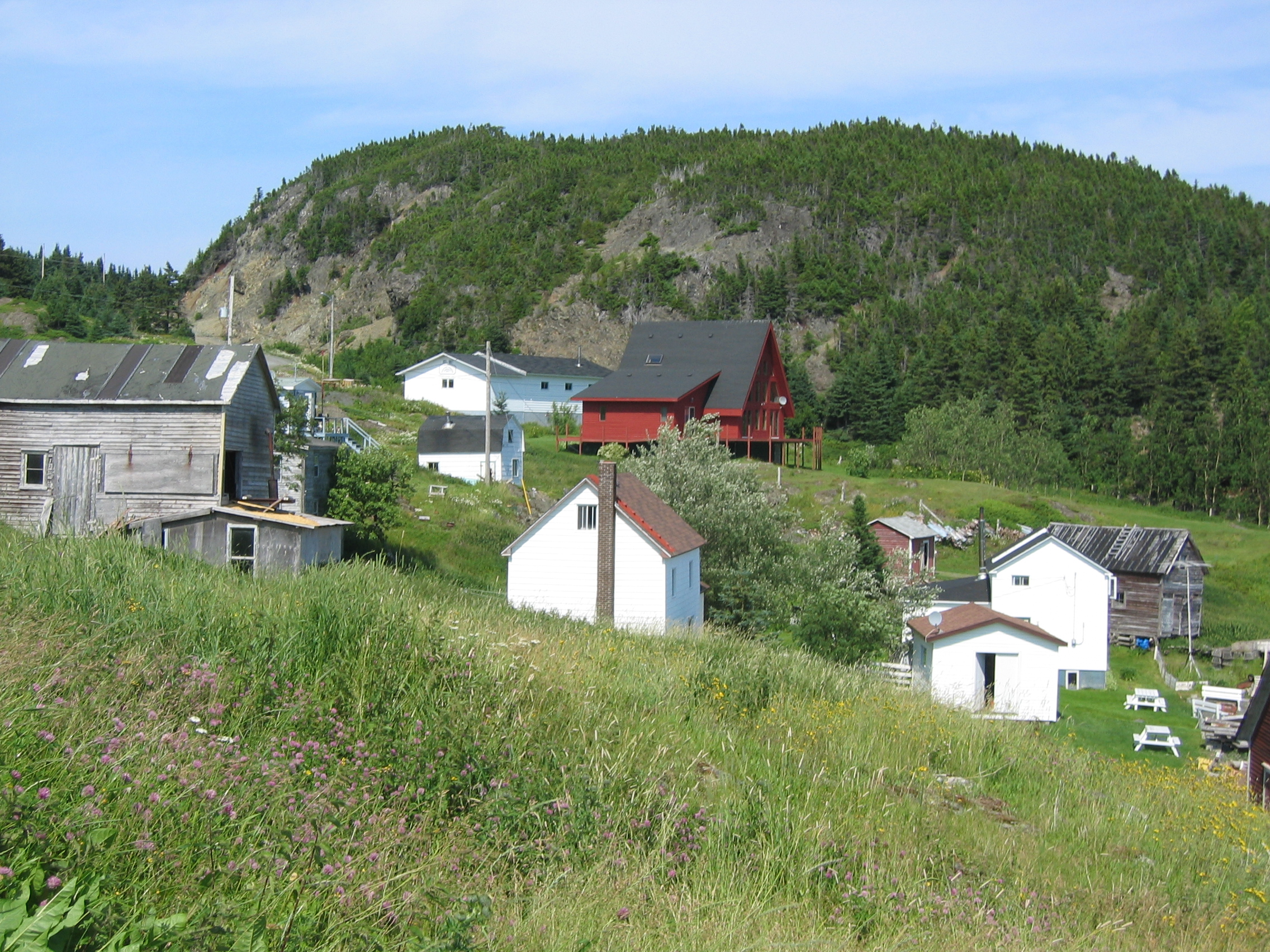

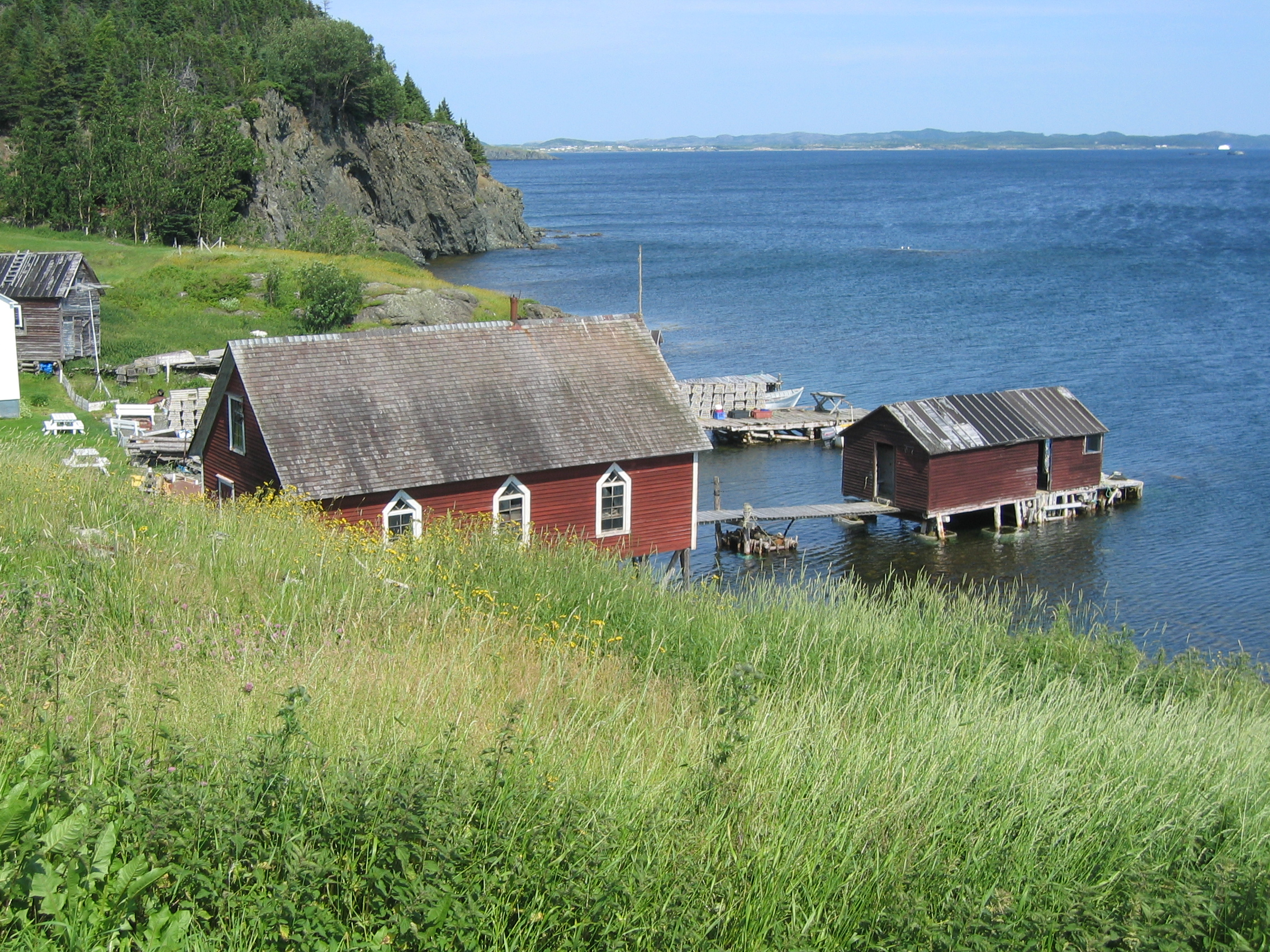

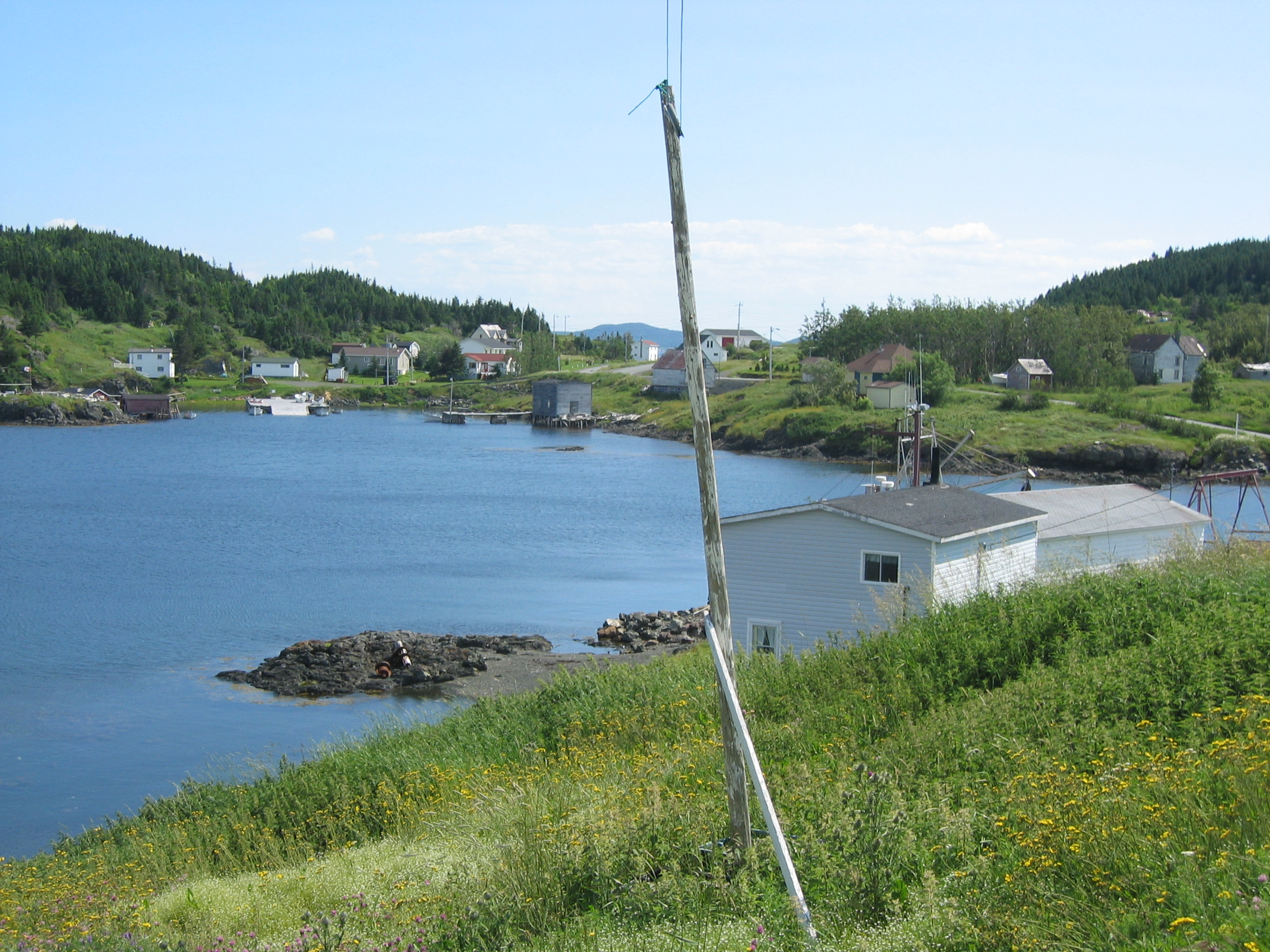

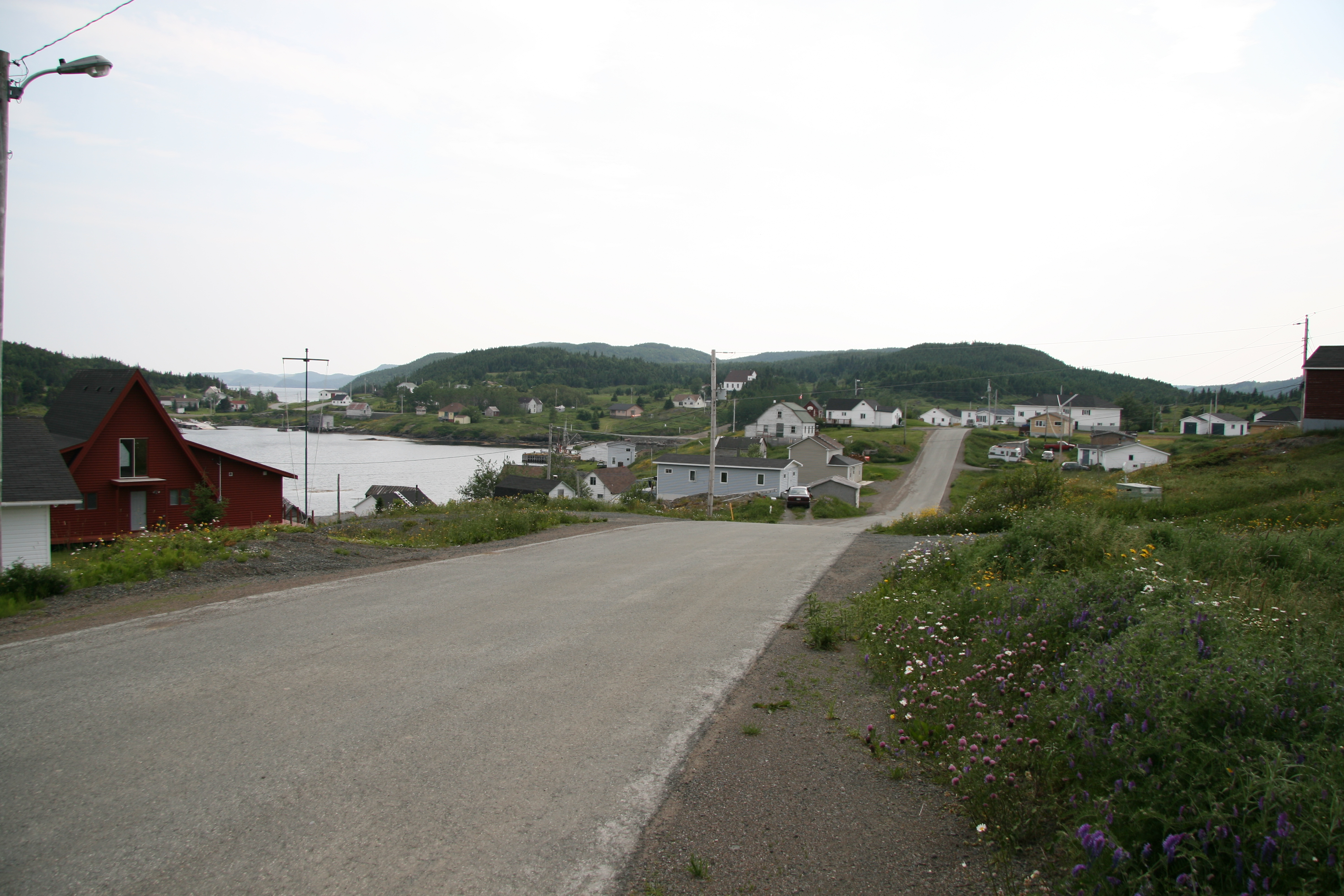

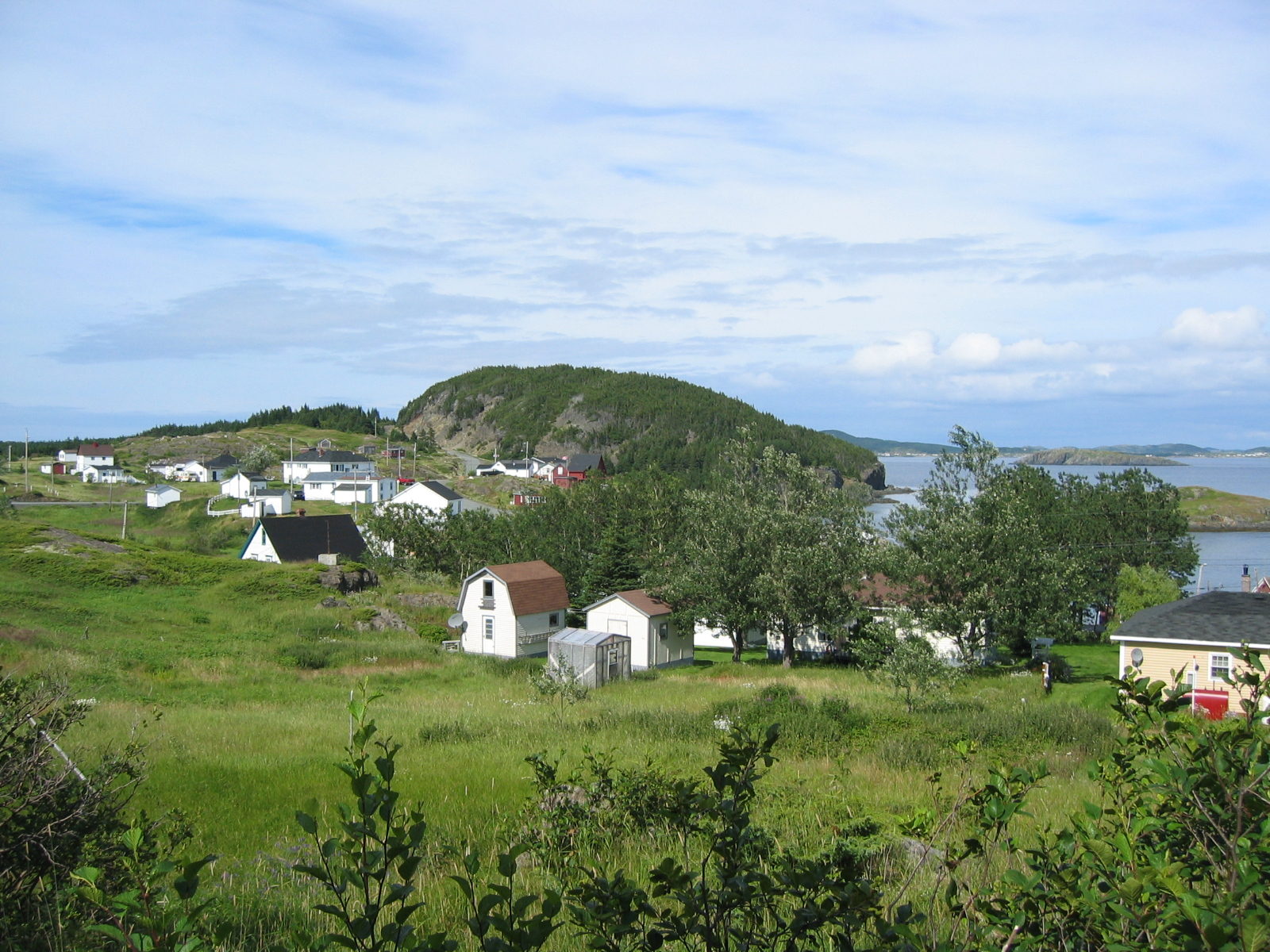

== See also ==
- List of designated places in Newfoundland and Labrador
- List of local service districts in Newfoundland and Labrador
- New World Island
