= Mill Cove, Newfoundland and Labrador =

Cove in Newfoundland and Labrador, Canada

Mill Cove
- Interactive map of Mill Cove
- Location: Newfoundland and Labrador, Canada
- Coordinates: 48°47′55″N 54°0′3″W
- Type: Cove
- Part of: Terra Nova
- Basin countries: Canada

Mill Cove is a cove in the Canadian province of Newfoundland and Labrador.
