= Cornelius Island =

Small uninhabited island in Rhode Island

Coordinates: 41°34′46″N 71°26′46″W

Cornelius Island is a small uninhabited island in Wickford Harbor, Narragansett Bay, Wickford, Rhode Island.

== History ==
The land compromising Cornelius Island was originally connected to the mainland and was part of the Smith/Updike land holdings until it was sold in 1813. A channel was dug at some point in the land's history disconnecting it from the mainland. It is unclear after whom Cornelius Island was named. The island was used in the 1960s for the deposition of dredged material.
