= Round Harbour, Bonavista, Newfoundland and Labrador =

Coordinates: 48°59′00″N 53°44′57″W

Round Harbour was located south west of Wesleyville, Newfoundland and Labrador.

== See also ==
- List of communities in Newfoundland and Labrador
