= Back Cove, Fogo, Newfoundland and Labrador =

Coordinates: 49°50′32″N 56°34′13.3″W

Back Cove is a small fishing village on Fogo Island, in the Fogo District. This place is separated from Fogo by a small neck of land. It had a population of 59 in 1956.

== See also ==
- List of communities in Newfoundland and Labrador
