= South East Bight =

- Local service district / designated place
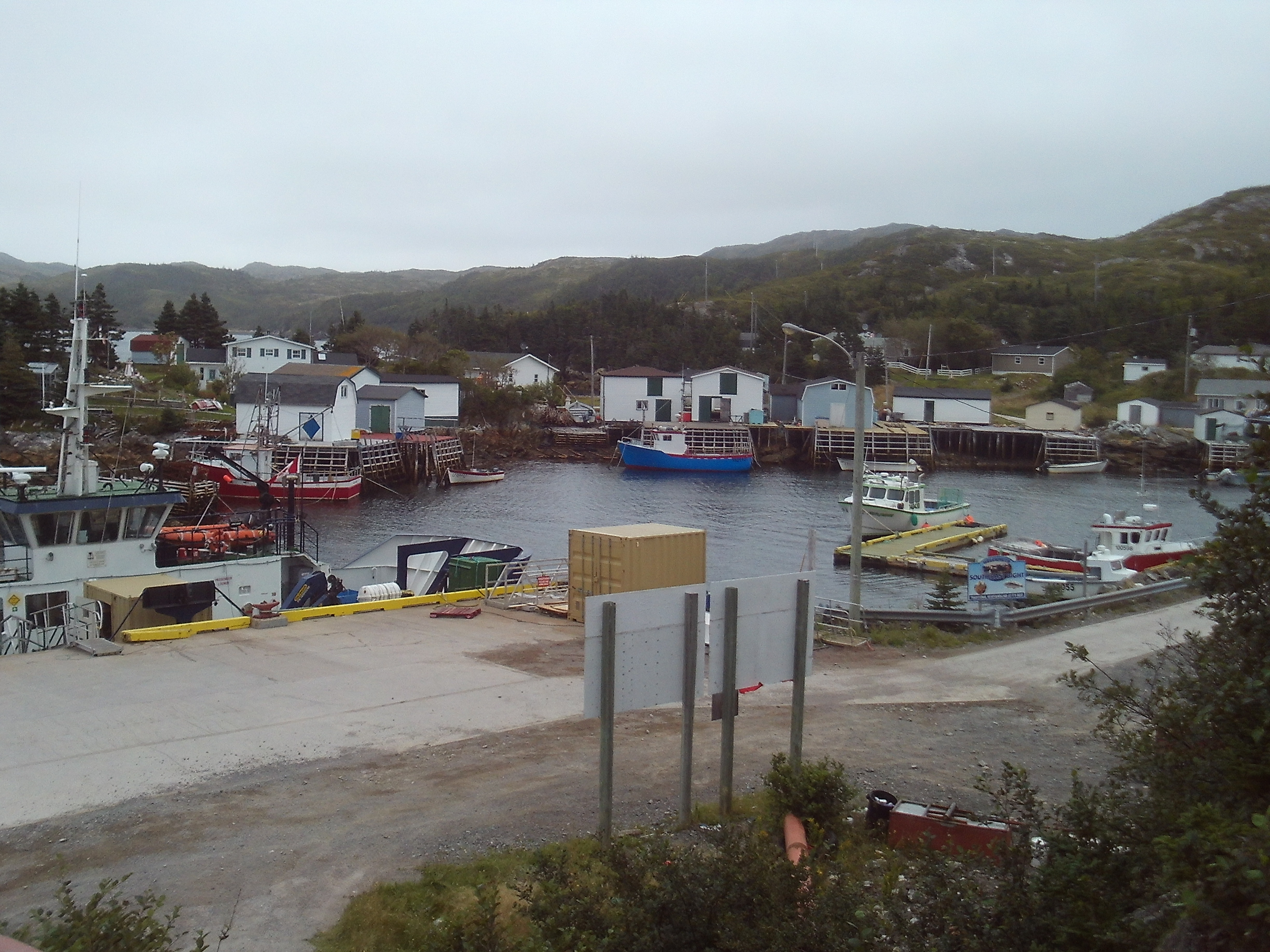

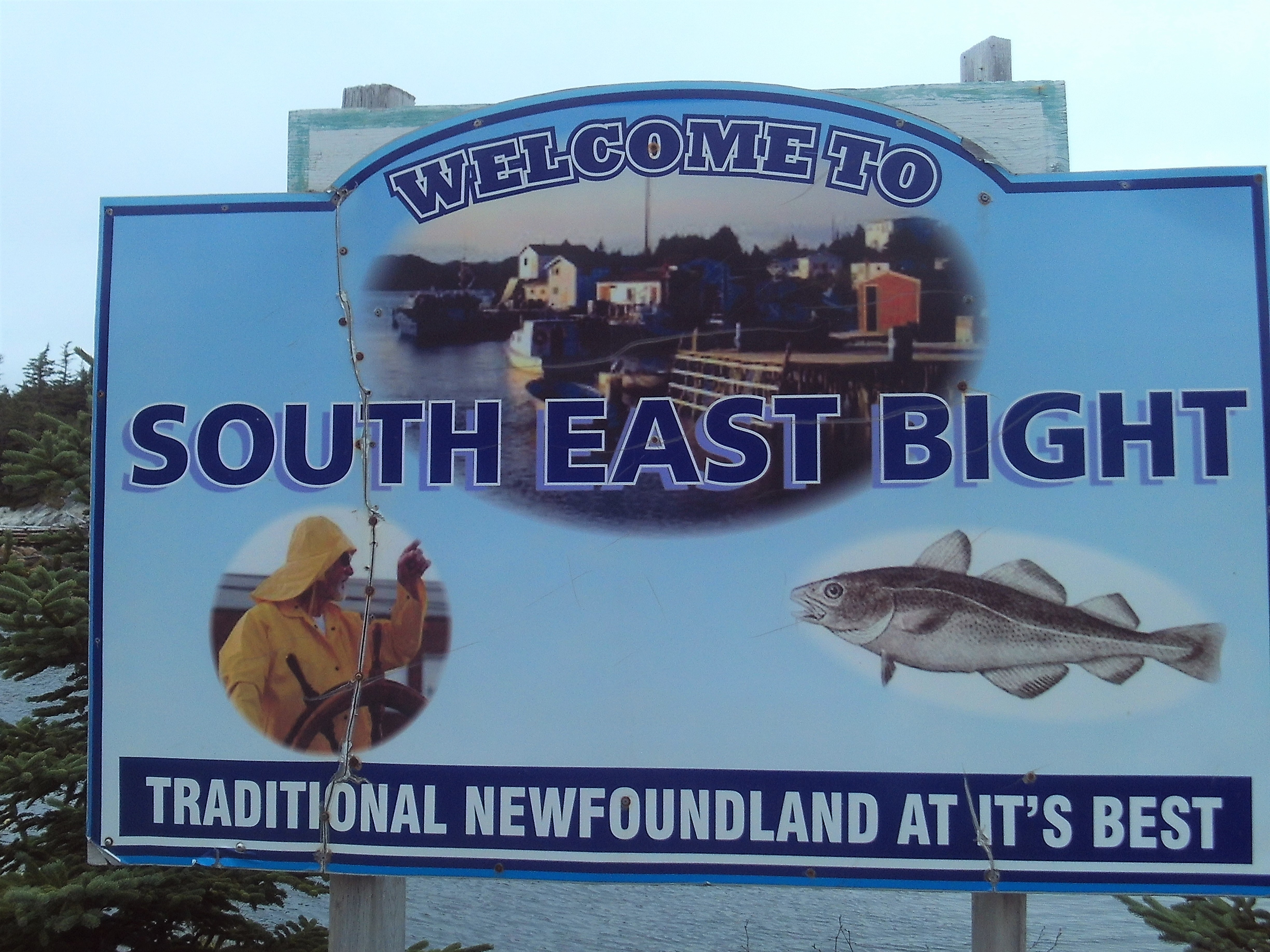

- Location of South East Bight in Newfoundland
- Coordinates: 47°23′0″N 54°35′0″W
- Country: Canada
- Province: Newfoundland and Labrador

Population (2025)
  - Total: 42
- Time zone: UTC-3:30 (Newfoundland Time)
  - Summer (DST): UTC-2:30 (Newfoundland Daylight)
- Area code: 709
- Highways: Ferry to Petit Forte

South East Bight (SEB) or Southeast Bight is a local service district and designated place in the Canadian province of Newfoundland and Labrador. It is on the western shore of Placentia Bay on the Burin Peninsula. The community is not connected by road and is only accessible by ferry from Petite Forte. Many people from the community travel to Monkstown in the winter by snowmobile, but is very uncommon to try to get there in the summer, because of marsh, bogs, ponds and hills. To get to South East Bight one must travel towards Marystown on the Burin Peninsula, turn off the highway at Boat Harbour, travel to Petite Forte and then take a half-hour ferry ride to South East Bight.

While there are a few vehicles on South East Bight, ATVs are the main form of transportation.

== History ==
South East Bight was originally settled by the Handlins in 1835. By 1836 the population had risen to about 30 people, all of Roman Catholic religion. A census taken in 1871 showed that the main families were Dunphy, Hayne, Hefferon, Hunt, Pitman, Reddy, Ward, and Wight.

The community name came from the direction one takes to reach the community, and bight refers to a wide inlet in the coast. The first settlers of South East Bight came in the early 1850s from England and Ireland. These settlers were people involved in the fishery. In the late 19th century South East Bight was a very busy place, with a commercial farm, a slate quarry and a couple of lobster factories. Fishing was the main occupation and remains so today. In the 19th century the population was about 30 families and by the 1930s it dropped to about five families then grew to about 30 families again in the 1950s. When resettlement occurred in the 1960s many people left the community but nine families came in from surrounding places like Darby's Harbour, Clattice Harbour, and Channels Harbour. Many of these families still live in the community and return to these resettled communities to visit their cabins. The community is fully Roman Catholic religion and every family is supported by the fishery. Family names that remain today are Lake, Ward, Whyte, Hefferan, Jones, Murphy, Brewer and Hepditch.

South East Bight once had a small slate mine operating but the venture was not feasible and was quickly closed down. Years ago the men traveled to the lumber woods and to mines in places like St. Lawrence, to work in the fall to get extra money to supplement the fishing income.

Hurricane Larry made landfall near South East Bight late in the evening of September 10, 2021.

== Geography ==
Southeast Bight is in Newfoundland within Subdivision C of Division No. 2.

== Demographics ==
As a designated place in the 2021 Census of Population conducted by Statistics Canada, Southeast Bight recorded a population of 118 living in 81 of its 157 total private dwellings, a change of 15.4% from its 2016 population of 92. With a land area of 0.81 km^{2} (0.31 sq mi), it had a population density of 113.6/km^{2} (294.2/sq mi) in 2016.

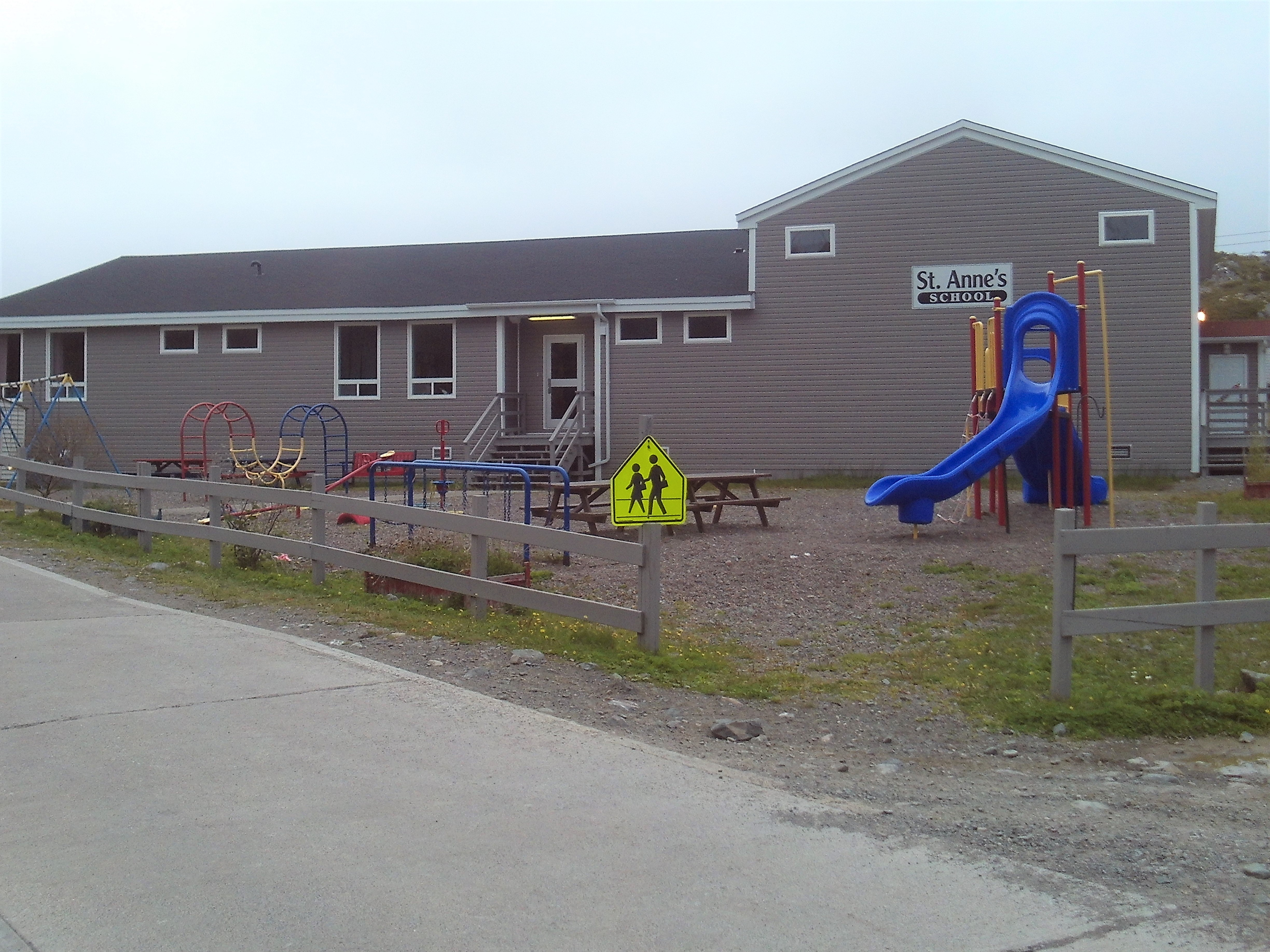
St. Anne's School

== Government ==
Southeast Bight is a local service district (LSD) that is governed by a committee responsible for the provision of certain services to the community. The chair of the LSD committee is Kevin Whyte.

== See also ==
- List of designated places in Newfoundland and Labrador
- List of local service districts in Newfoundland and Labrador
- Newfoundland outport
- Petite Forte, Newfoundland and Labrador
