= Goose Cove East =

- Town
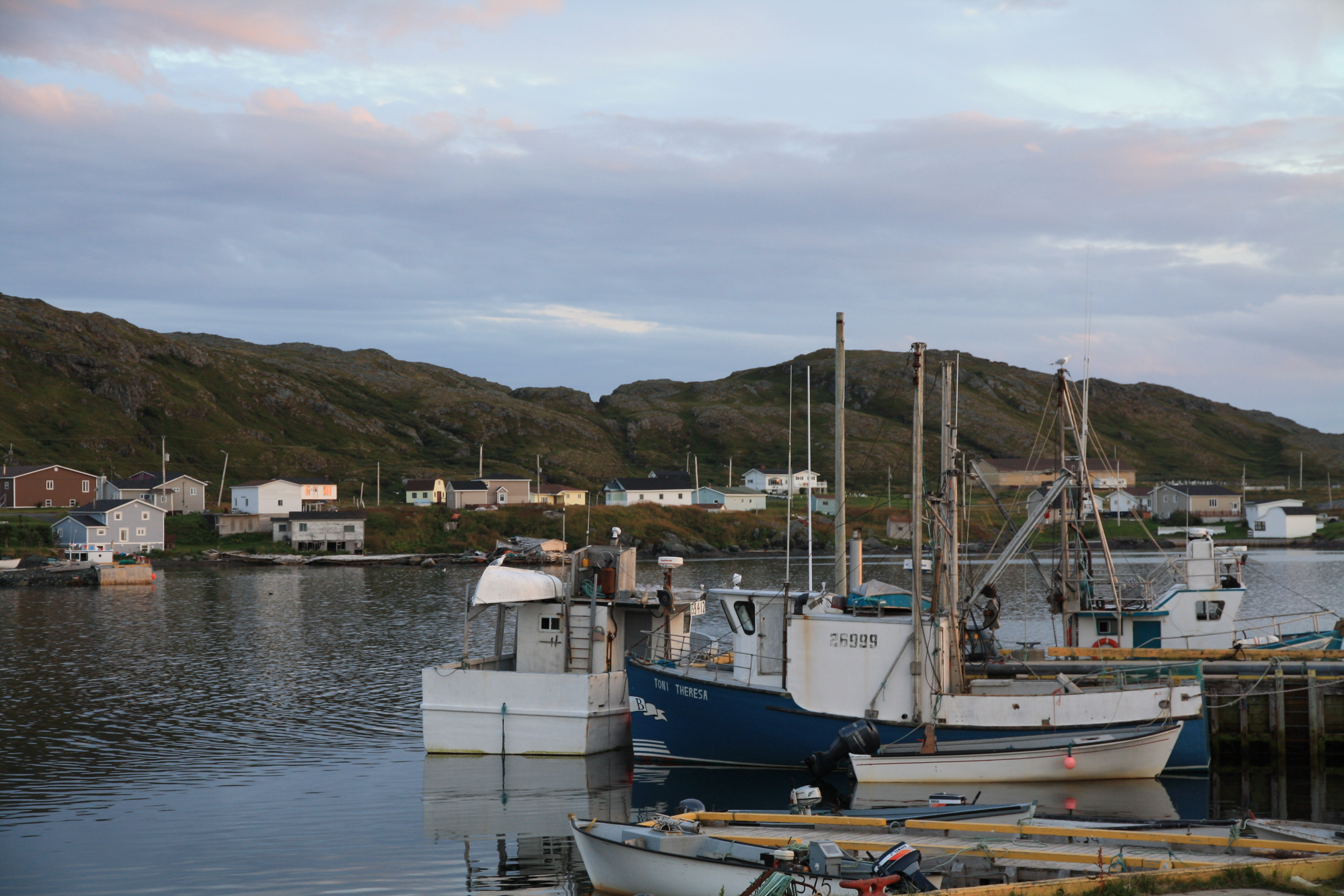
- Goose Cove at sunset from the wharf
- Interactive map of Goose Cove East
- Coordinates: 51°18′27″N 55°37′38″W
- Country: Canada
- Province: Newfoundland and Labrador

Population (2021)
  - Total: 172
- Time zone: UTC-3:30 (Newfoundland Time)
  - Summer (DST): UTC-2:30 (Newfoundland Daylight)
- Area code: 709

Goose Cove East is a town in the Canadian province of Newfoundland and Labrador. The town had a population of 172 in the Canada 2021 Census.

== Demographics ==
In the 2021 Census of Population conducted by Statistics Canada, Goose Cove East had a population of 172 living in 70 of its 87 total private dwellings, a change of −1.1% from its 2016 population of 174. With a land area of 2.71 km^{2} (1.05 sq mi), it had a population density of 63.5/km^{2} (164.4/sq mi) in 2021.

== See also ==
- List of cities and towns in Newfoundland and Labrador
