= Journois =

Coordinates: 48.355°N 58.681°W

Location of Journois in Newfoundland and Labrador

Journois is a settlement in Newfoundland and Labrador. Its population at the 2016 census was 16, down from the 21 people recorded in 2011. Journois has seen a gradual fall in population over the last 30 or so years. The 2021 census indicated that Journois's 2016 population figure had been revised to 14, and that an increase over the last five years showed that 21 people were again resident at the settlement.
