= Flat Bay =

Human settlement in Canada

Location of Flat Bay in Newfoundland and Labrador

Flat Bay (Mi'kmaq: Ewipkek) is a local service district and designated place in the Canadian province of Newfoundland and Labrador. It is a Canadian community in southwestern Newfoundland.

== History ==
The exact reason for how the Mi'kmaq settled in Newfoundland is debated. Common theories include that the Mi'kmaq migrated to Newfoundland on their own behalf while other theories suggest that Europeans brought them to the island. Conflicts with the British led Chief Jeannot Pequidalouet to relocate his band from Cape Breton to Newfoundland in the 1760s.

The Mi'kmaq first established Flat Bay as a seasonal settlement where they maintained trade with European explorers and settlers. It was also settled by Acadians such as Germain LeBlanc (from Nova Scotia) and Andre Alexandre (who was 25% Mi'kmaq). Their descendants bear the anglicized surnames "White" and "Alexander" which are common in Flat Bay today. Another white settler was Benjamin Perrier, who emigrated from France. In 1818, Edward Chappell visited Newfoundland and found an elderly Mi'kmaq chief (possibly named "Old Tomma") and his band had been established in the area. They had been granted land by British authorities for being loyal to the British crown.

The community was historically split into Flat Bay West, Flat Bay East and St. Teresa's.

The Mi'kmaq typically lived in the island's interior for large portions of the year. Overhunting of the caribou followed the construction of a railway across Newfoundland in the 1890s. Low fur prices in the 1930s caused many Mi'kmaq to give up their traditional way of life and settle in permanent villages such as Flat Bay.

== Geography ==
Flat Bay is in Newfoundland within Subdivision C of Division No. 4.

== Demographics ==
As a designated place in the 2016 Census of Population conducted by Statistics Canada, Flat Bay recorded a population of 210 living in 94 of its 100 total private dwellings, a change of -8.3% from its 2011 population of 229. With a land area of 4.43 km^{2} (1.71 sq mi), it had a population density of 47.4/km^{2} (122.8/sq mi) in 2016. Of its 210 residents, 115 individuals were identified as having First Nations origin (entirely or in part).

== Government ==
Flat Bay East (also known as Muddy Hole) is a local service district (LSD) that is governed by a committee responsible for the provision of certain services to the community. The chair of the LSD committee is Frederick Nelma.

Flat Bay West is not a local service district and has been under the governance of Chief and Council since 1972. Chief and Council, along with dedicated staff and volunteers, run the affairs of the community independently from Municipal, Provincial, or Federal Governments. Since the time of its founding the Flat Bay Band has always considered the entire community the fiduciary responsibility of the Federal Government of Canada and has constantly fought, negotiated, and made decrees to this fact.

== Notable people ==
- Senator Judy White - KC and Member of the Senate of Canada
- Mi'kmaw Elder Calvin White - Former President of the FNI, Order of Canada, Order of Newfoundland.
- Eric White - actor and filmmaker
- Ivan J White - writer, filmmaker, musician

== See also ==
- List of communities in Newfoundland and Labrador
- List of designated places in Newfoundland and Labrador
- List of local service districts in Newfoundland and Labrador
- Qalipu Mi'kmaq First Nation Band
