= Well Bay (Newfoundland and Labrador) =

Bay in Newfoundland and Labrador, Canada

Coordinates: 50.800°N 57.214°W

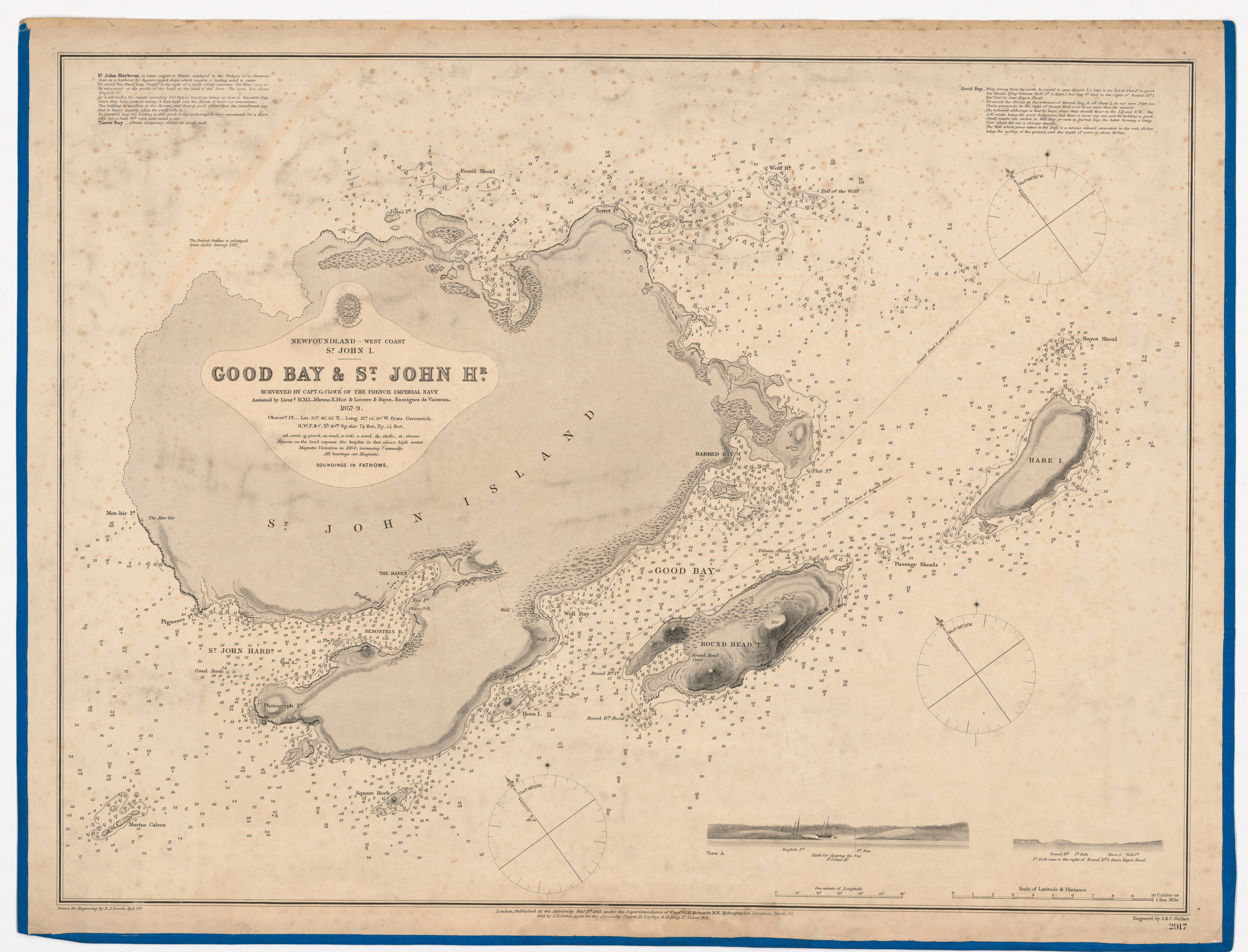
An 1865 map of Good Bay, St. John Harbor

Well Bay is a natural bay near St. John Harbor, off the island of Newfoundland in the province of Newfoundland and Labrador, Canada. It is located on the southern part of St. John Harbor, in a bay called Good Bay. Well Bay is a natural indentation in the northern part of Good Bay. The middle of Well Bay has depths of 9.1–10.9 m (29.9–35.8 ft). About 0.5 mile northeast of Well Bay, there are two beacons.
