= Newfoundland (island) =

Island portion of Newfoundland and Labrador, Canada

Nickname: "The Rock"
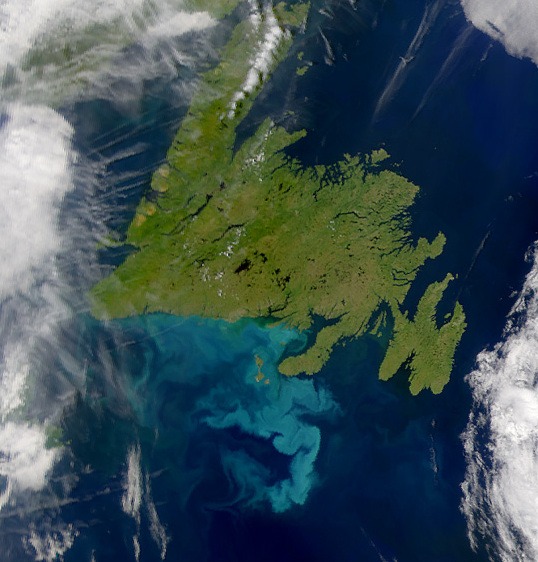
- Satellite view of Newfoundland

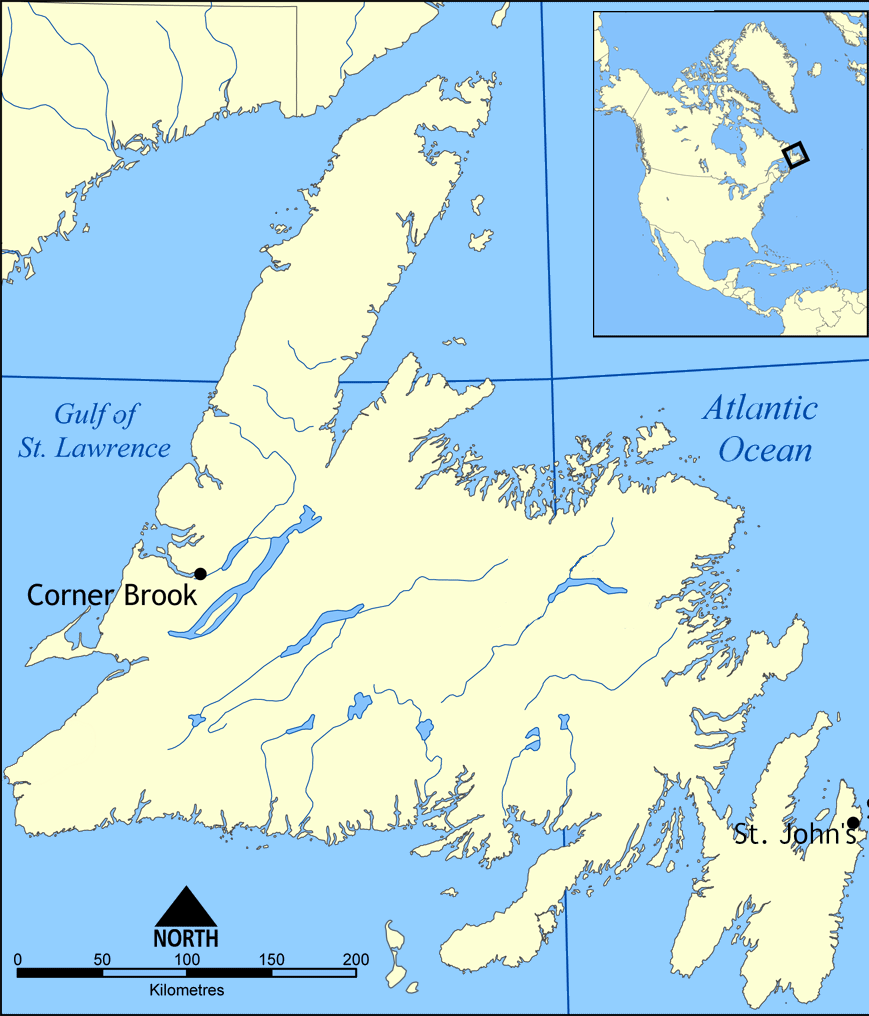
- Map of Newfoundland

Geography
- Location: Atlantic Ocean
- Coordinates: 48°32′30″N 56°07′30″W
- Area: 108,878.06 km^{2} (42,038.05 sq mi) (2026)
- Area rank: 4th largest in Canada; 15th largest worldwide
- Coastline: 9,656 km (6000 mi)
- Highest elevation: 814 m (2671 ft)
- Highest point: The Cabox

Administration
- Canada
- Province: Newfoundland and Labrador
- Largest settlement: St. John's (pop. 200,600)

Demographics
- Demonym: Newfoundlander (Note: Although the term Newfie is sometimes used in casual speech, some Newfoundlanders consider it a pejorative.)
- Population: 477,787 (2016)
- Population rank: 79
- Pop. density: 4.39/km^{2} (11.37/sq mi)
- Ethnic groups: English, Irish, Scottish, French, and Mi'kmaq

Additional information
- Time zone: Newfoundland Standard Time (UTC−03:30)
  - Summer (DST): Newfoundland Daylight Time (UTC−02:30)
- Longest river: Exploits River (246 km (153 mi))

Newfoundland (Note: /ˈnjuːfən(d)lænd/ NEW-fən(d)-land, locally /ˌnuːfənˈlænd/ NOO-fən-LAND; French: Terre-Neuve, locally [tɛʁ'nœːv]) is a large island within the Canadian province of Newfoundland and Labrador. It is situated off the eastern coast of the North American mainland, to the south of Labrador. The island contains 29% of the province's land area, but is home to over 90% of the province's population, with about 60% of the province's population located on the small southeastern Avalon Peninsula. The island is separated from the Labrador Peninsula by the Strait of Belle Isle and from Cape Breton Island by the Cabot Strait. It blocks the mouth of the Saint Lawrence River, creating the Gulf of Saint Lawrence, the world's largest estuary. Newfoundland's nearest neighbour, at only 19 km (12 mi) away, is the French overseas collectivity of Saint Pierre and Miquelon (French: Saint Pierre et Miquelon). It has an area of 108,878.06 km^{2} (42,038.05 sq mi). Newfoundland is the world's fifteenth-largest island, Canada's fourth-largest island, and the largest Canadian island outside the North. The provincial capital, St. John's, is located on the southeastern coast of the island; Cape Spear, just south of the capital, is the easternmost point of North America, excluding Greenland. It is common to consider all directly neighbouring islands such as New World, Twillingate, Fogo and Bell Island to be 'part of Newfoundland' (i.e., distinct from Labrador). By that classification, Newfoundland (including its associated small islands) have a total area of 111,390 km^{2} (43,010 sq mi). According to 2006 official Census Canada statistics, 57% of responding Newfoundland and Labradorians claim British or Irish ancestry, with 43.2% claiming at least one English parent, 21.5% at least one Irish parent, and 7% at least one parent of Scottish origin. Additionally, 6.1% claimed at least one parent of French ancestry. The island's total population as of the 2006 census was 479,105, which had then increased to 510,550 residents in the 2021 census.

== History ==
Newfoundland was long inhabited by indigenous peoples of the Dorset culture and the Beothuk, who spoke the now-extinct Beothuk language. The island was possibly visited by the Icelandic explorer Leif Erikson in the 11th century as a rest settlement when heading farther south to the land believed to be closer to the mouth of the St. Lawrence River called "Vinland". The first confirmed visit was by the Norse who built a temporary base at L'Anse aux Meadows, a Norse settlement near the northernmost tip of Newfoundland (Cape Norman), which has been dated to be approximately a millennium (1000 years) old. The site is considered the only undisputed evidence of Pre-Columbian contact between the Old and New Worlds if the Norse–Inuit contact on Greenland is not counted. The next European visitors to Newfoundland were Portuguese, Dutch and French fishermen. The island was possibly visited by navigator John Cabot, working under contract to Henry VII of England on his expedition from Bristol in 1497. In 1501 Portuguese brothers Gaspar Corte-Real and Miguel Corte-Real charted part of the coast of Newfoundland in an attempt to find the Northwest Passage.

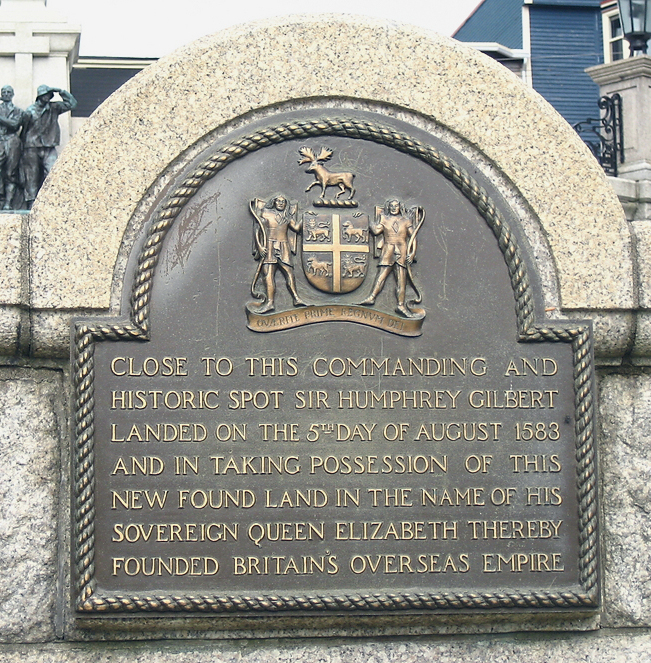
Plaque commemorating Gilbert's founding of the British Empire

On 5 August 1583, Humphrey Gilbert claimed Newfoundland as England's first overseas colony under Royal Charter of Queen Elizabeth I, thus officially establishing a forerunner to the much later British Empire. Newfoundland is considered Britain's oldest colony. Over time, the settlers of Newfoundland developed local dialects of English and French. In the 19th century, Newfoundland also had a dialect of Irish known as Newfoundland Irish. The closely related Scottish Gaelic was also spoken on the island during the 19th and early 20th centuries, particularly in the Codroy Valley area, chiefly by settlers from Cape Breton Island, Nova Scotia. The Gaelic names reflected the association with fishing: in Scottish Gaelic, it was called Eilean a' Trosg, literally 'Island of the Cod'. Similarly, the Irish name Talamh an Éisc means 'Land of the Fish'.

=== First inhabitants ===
The first inhabitants of Newfoundland were the Paleo-Eskimo, who have no known link to other groups in Newfoundland history. Little is known about them beyond archaeological evidence of early settlements. Evidence of successive cultures have been found. The Late Paleo-Eskimo, or Dorset culture, settled there about 4,000 years ago. They were descendants of migrations of ancient prehistoric peoples across the High Arctic thousands of years ago, after crossing from Siberia via the Bering land bridge. The Dorset died off or abandoned the island prior to the arrival of the Norse. After this period, the Beothuk settled in Newfoundland, migrating from Labrador on the mainland. There is no evidence that the Beothuk inhabited the island before Norse settlement. Scholars believe that the Beothuk are related closely to the Innu of Labrador. The tribe later was declared "extinct" although people of partial Beothuk descent have been documented. The name Beothuk meant 'people' in the Beothuk language, which is often considered to be a member of the Algonquian language family although the lack of sufficient records means that it is not possible to demonstrate such a connection confidently. The tribe is now typically considered extinct, but evidence of its culture is preserved in museums and historical and archaeological records. Shanawdithit, a woman who is often regarded as the last full-blood Beothuk, died in St. John's in 1829 of tuberculosis. However, Santu Toney, born around 1835 and died in 1910, was a woman of mixed Mi'kmaq and Beothuk descent, meaning some Beothuk must have lived on beyond 1829. She described her father as Beothuk and mother as Mi'kmaq, both from Newfoundland. The Beothuk may have intermingled and assimilated with Innu in Labrador and Mi'kmaq in Newfoundland. European histories also suggest potential historical competition and hostility between the Beothuk and Mi'kmaq, though this is refuted by indigenous oral history. The Mi'kmaq, Innu and Inuit all hunted and fished around Newfoundland but no evidence indicates that they lived on the island for long periods of time and would only travel to Newfoundland temporarily. Inuit have been documented on the Great Northern Peninsula as late as the 18th century. Newfoundland was historically the southernmost part of the Inuit's territorial range. The island of Newfoundland is known as Akami-assiss ("small land on the other side") in Innu, as Kallunasillik ("in the process of having white people") in Inuttitut, and as Ktaqmkuk ("across the waves") in Mi'kmaq. When Europeans arrived from 1497 and later, starting with John Cabot, they established contact with the Beothuk. Estimates of the number of Beothuk on the island at this time vary, typically around 700. Later both the English and French settled the island. They were followed by the Mi'kmaq, an Algonquian-speaking indigenous people from eastern Canada and present-day Nova Scotia. As European and Mi'kmaq settlement became year-round and expanded to new areas of the coast, the area available to the Beothuk to harvest the marine resources they relied upon was diminished. By the beginning of the 19th century, few Beothuk remained. Most died due to infectious diseases carried by Europeans, to which they had no immunity, and starvation. Government attempts to engage with the Beothuk and aid them came too late. The Beothuk did not have friendly relations with foreigners, unlike the Mi'kmaq. The latter readily traded with Europeans and became established in settlements in Newfoundland.

=== European contact and settlement ===
Newfoundland is the site of the only authenticated Norse settlement in North America. An archaeological site was discovered in 1960 at L'Anse aux Meadows by Norwegian explorer Helge Ingstad and his wife, archaeologist Anne Stine Ingstad. This site was the subject of archaeological studies throughout the 1960s and 1970s. This research estimated that the settlement dates to about the year 1000, and the site contains the earliest-known European structures in North America. In 2021, an interdisciplinary team used the Miyake event of 993–994 as a benchmark in dendrochronology (tree-ring studies) to precisely determine that Vikings were present in L'Anse aux Meadows in Newfoundland in year 1021. Designated as a World Heritage Site by UNESCO, it is believed to be the Vinland settlement of explorer Leif Erikson. (The Icelandic Skálholt map of 1570 refers to the area as "Promontorium Winlandiæ" and correctly shows it on a 51°N parallel with Bristol, England). Before and after the departure of the Norse, the island was inhabited by indigenous populations.

=== Exploration by Cabot ===
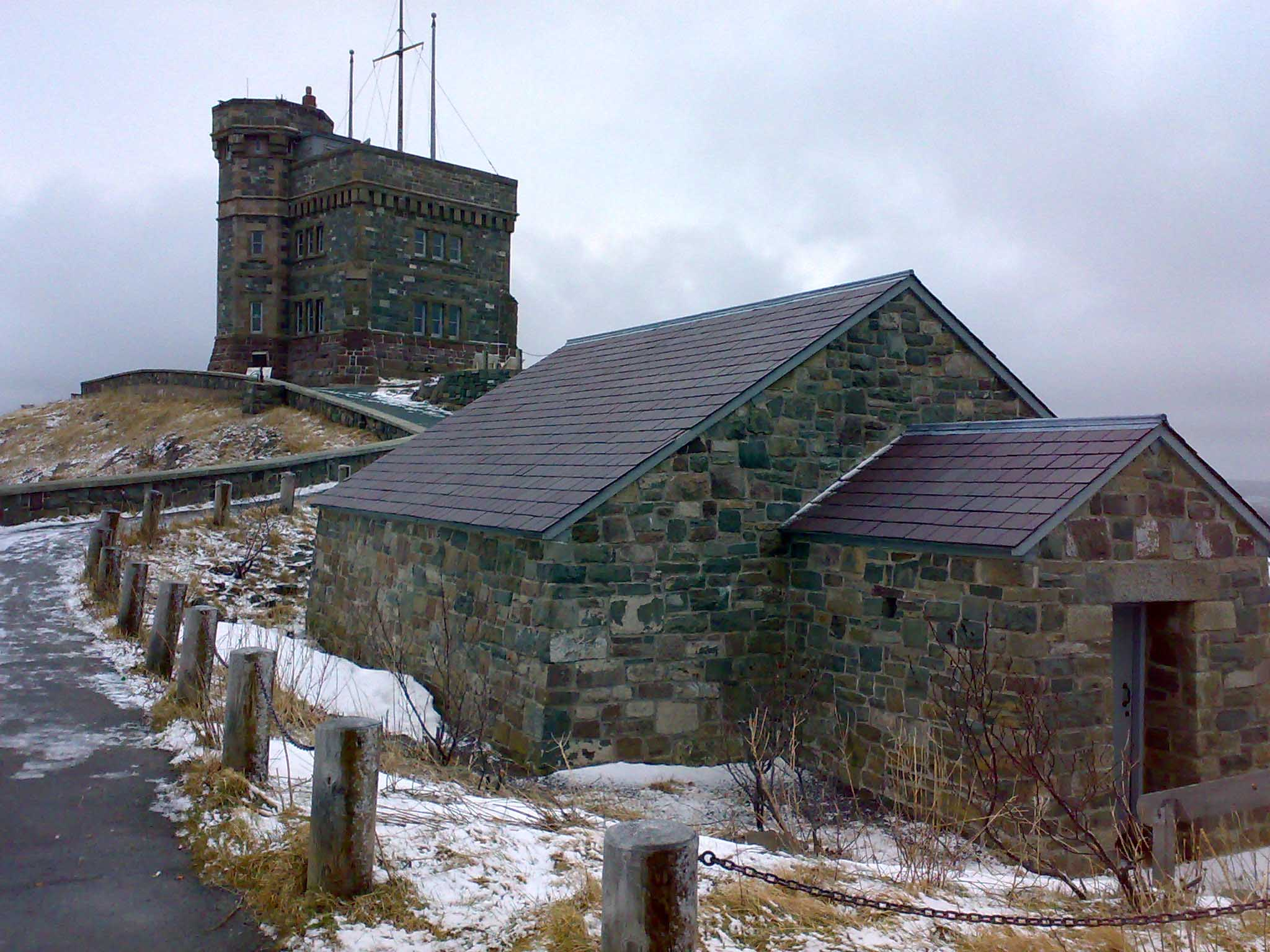
Cabot Tower located in St John's

About 500 years later, in 1497, the Italian navigator John Cabot (Zuan/Giovanni Caboto) became the first European since the Norse settlers to set foot on Newfoundland, working under commission of King Henry VII of England. His landing site is unknown but popularly believed to be Cape Bonavista, along the island's East coast. Another site claimed is Cape Bauld, at the tip of the Great Northern Peninsula. A document found in the Spanish National Archives, written by a Bristol merchant, reports that Cabot's crew landed 2,900 km (1,800 mi) west of Dursey Head, Ireland (latitude 51°35′N), which would put Cabot within sight of Cape Bauld. This document mentions an island that Cabot sailed past to go ashore on the mainland. This description fits with the Cape Bauld theory, as Belle Isle is not far offshore.

=== Other European explorers ===
After Cabot, the first European visitors to Newfoundland were Portuguese, Spanish, Basque, French and English migratory fishermen. In 1501, Portuguese explorers Gaspar Corte-Real and his brother Miguel Corte-Real charted part of the coast of Newfoundland in a failed attempt to find the Northwest Passage. Late in the 17th century came Irish fishermen, who found so many fisheries that they named the island Talamh an Éisc, meaning 'Land of the Fish', more loosely 'the fishing grounds' in Irish.

==== Colonization ====
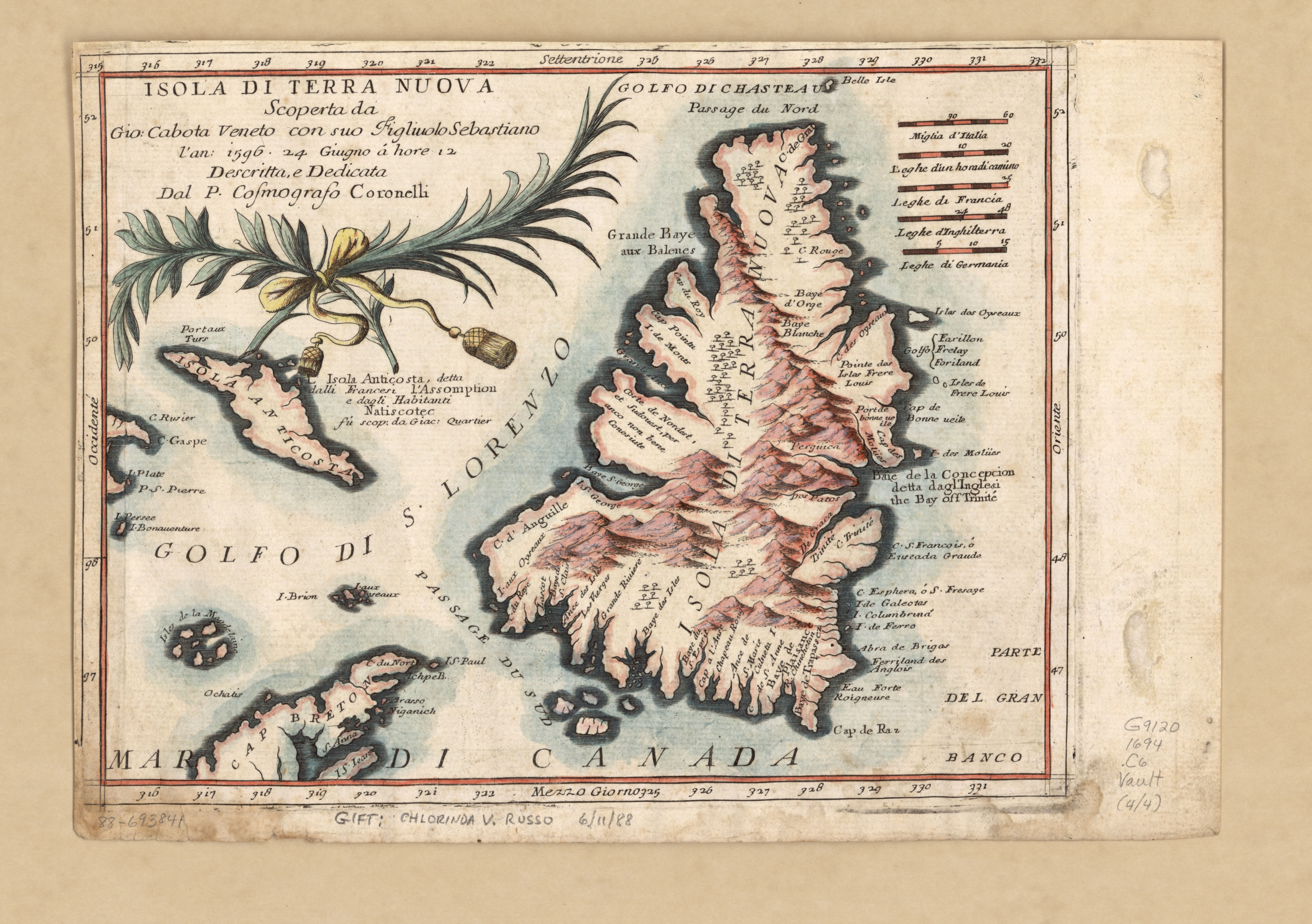
Map of Newfoundland by Vincenzo Coronelli, 1 January 1692

In 1583, when Sir Humphrey Gilbert formally claimed Newfoundland as a colony of England, he found numerous English, French and Portuguese vessels at St. John's. There was no permanent European population. Gilbert was lost at sea during his return voyage, and plans of settlement were postponed. In July 1596 the Scottish vessel the "William" left Aberdeen for "new fund land" (Newfoundland) and returned in 1600. On 5 July 1610, John Guy set sail from Bristol, England, with 39 other colonists for Cuper's Cove. This, and other early attempts at permanent settlement failed to make a profit for the English investors, but some settlers remained, forming the very earliest modern European population on the island. By 1620, the fishermen of England's West Country dominated the east coast of Newfoundland. French fishermen dominated the island's south coast and Northern Peninsula. The decline of the fisheries, the wasting of the shoreline forests, and an overstocking of liquor by local merchants influenced the Whitehall government in 1675 to decline to set up a colonial governor on the island.

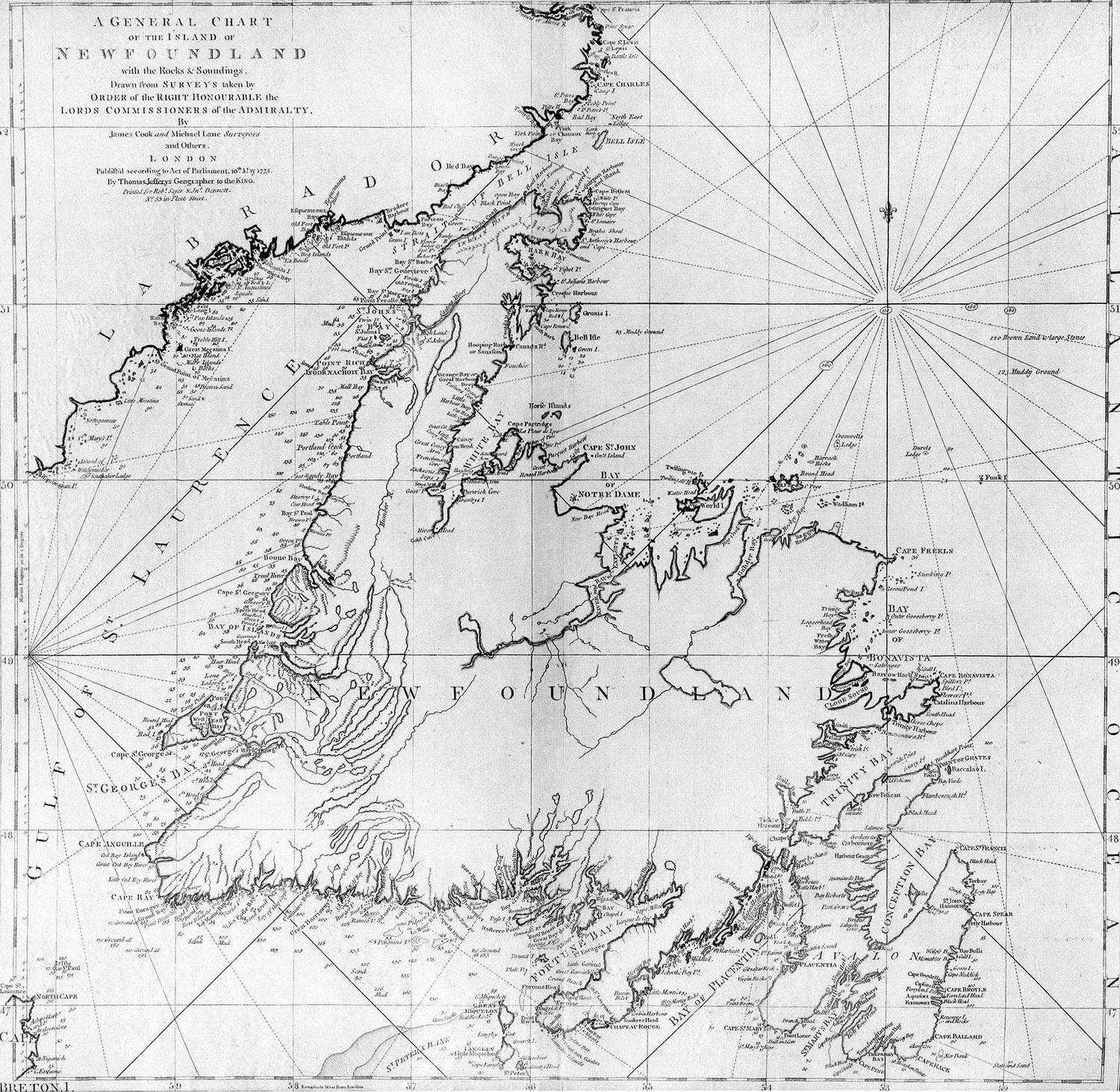
James Cook's 1775 Chart of Newfoundland

After 1713, with the Treaty of Utrecht, the French ceded control of south and north shores of the island to the British. They kept only the nearby islands of St. Pierre and Miquelon, located in the fish-rich Grand Banks off the south coast. Despite some early settlements by the English, the Crown discouraged permanent, year-round settlement of Newfoundland by migratory fishery workers. Thomas Nash was an Irish Catholic fisherman who permanently settled in Newfoundland. He established the fishing town of Branch. He and his cousin Father Patrick Power of Callan, County Kilkenny, spread Catholicism in Newfoundland. This settlement attracted a major migration of Irish Catholic immigrants to Newfoundland in the early eighteenth century. By the late 18th century, permanent settlement increased, peaking in the early years of the 19th century. The French name for the island is Terre-Neuve. The name Newfoundland is one of the oldest European place names in Canada in continuous geographical and cartographical use, dating from a 1502 letter. It was stated in the following 1628 poem: A Skeltonicall continued ryme, in praise of my New-found-Land

Although in cloaths, company, buildings faire
With England, New-found-land cannot compare:
Did some know what contentment I found there,
Alwayes enough, most times somewhat to spare,
With little paines, lesse toyle, and lesser care,
Exempt from taxings, ill newes, Lawing, feare,
If cleane, and warme, no matter what you weare,
Healthy, and wealthy, if men careful are,
With much-much more, then I will now declare,
(I say) if some wise men knew what this were
(I doe beleeue) they'd live no other where.

From 'The First Booke of Qvodlibets'
Composed and done at Harbor-Grace in
Britaniola, anciently called Newfound-Land
by Governor Robert Hayman – 1628.

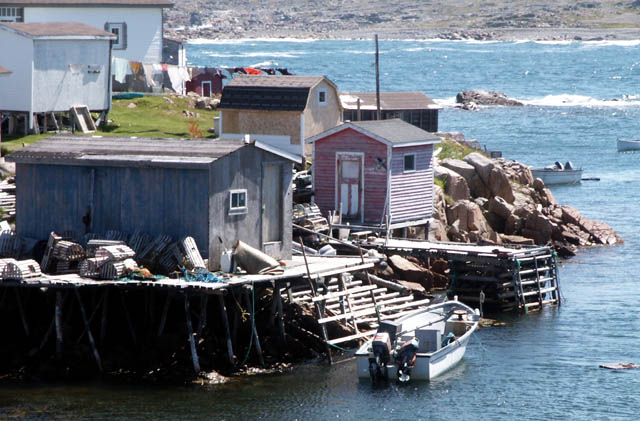
A Newfoundland fishing outport

After the 1783 independence of the Thirteen Colonies that became the United States of America, the remaining continental colonies and the North Atlantic Ocean colony of Bermuda were organised and administered as British North America. All except the Newfoundland Colony and Bermuda confederated in 1867 to form the Dominion of Canada. Newfoundland and Bermuda would retain links (possibly explaining similarities between the Newfoundland English and Bermudian English), including settlement in Newfoundland of Bermudians such as Joseph Outerbridge, especially their being grouped under the Bishop of Newfoundland until a separate Bishop of Bermuda was created in 1919, though Newfoundland would become a dominion in its own right from 1907 (the Dominion of Newfoundland), before reverting to colonial status in 1934, and finally joining the Dominion of Canada in 1949 as the Province of Newfoundland.

==== A new society ====
The European immigrants, mostly English, Scots, Irish and French, built a society in the New World unlike the ones they had left. It was also different from those that other immigrants would build on the North American mainland. As a fish-exporting society, Newfoundland was in contact with many ports and societies around the Atlantic rim. But its geographic location and political distinctiveness isolated it from its closest neighbours, Canada and the United States of America. Internally, most of its population was spread widely around a rugged coastline in small outport settlements. Many were distant from larger centres of population and isolated for long periods by winter ice or bad weather. These conditions had an effect on the cultures of the immigrants. They generated new ways of thinking and acting. Newfoundland and Labrador developed a wide variety of distinctive customs, beliefs, stories, songs and dialects. A unique vocabulary arose focused on the sea ice and weather of this isolated location and the native wildlife its residents relied upon for food and income.

=== Effects of World Wars ===
The First World War had a powerful and lasting effect on the society. From a population of about a quarter of a million, 5,482 men went overseas. Nearly 1,500 were killed and 2,300 wounded. On July 1, 1916, at Beaumont-Hamel, France, 753 men of the Royal Newfoundland Regiment went over the top of a trench. The next morning, only 68 men answered the roll-call. Even now, when the rest of Canada celebrates the founding of the country on July 1, many Newfoundlanders take part in solemn ceremonies of remembrance. The Second World War also had a lasting effect on Newfoundland. In particular, the United States assigned forces to the military bases at Argentia ([nowadays] part of the Town of Placentia), Gander, Stephenville, Goose Bay, and St. John's.

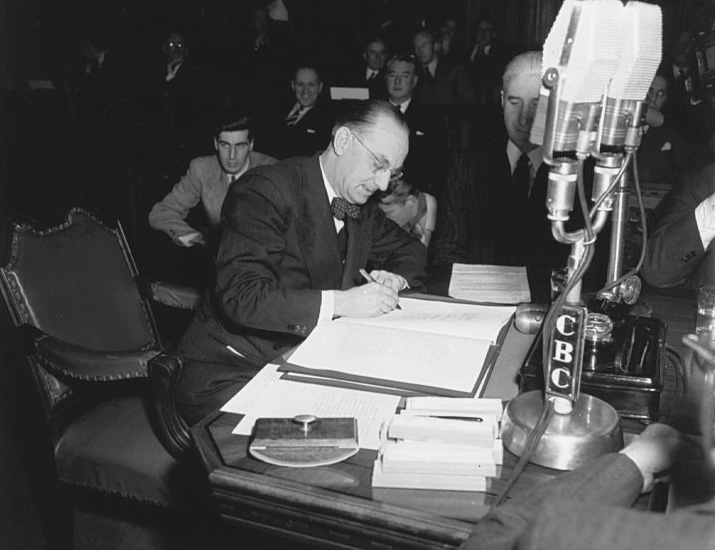
Joseph Smallwood signing the document bringing Newfoundland into the Canadian Confederation

Newfoundland and Labrador is the youngest province in Canada. Newfoundland was organised as a colony in 1825, was self-governing from 1855 to 1934, but after a financial crisis the legislature was suspended and it was ruled through a Commission of Government (see Dominion of Newfoundland). On June 22 and July 3, 1948, the population of the colony voted in referendums 52.3% to 47.7% in favour of joining Canada as a province. Opposition to confederation was concentrated among residents of the capital St. John's and its surrounding hinterland on the Avalon Peninsula.

=== Union with Canada ===
Newfoundland joined Canada at one minute before midnight on March 31, 1949. Union with Canada has done little to reduce Newfoundlanders' self-image as a distinctive group. In 2003, 72% of residents responding identified first as Newfoundlanders, secondarily as Canadians. Separatist sentiment is low, though, less than 12% in the same 2003 study. The referendum campaign of 1948 was bitterly fought, and interests in both Canada and Britain favoured and supported confederation with Canada. Jack Pickersgill, a western Canadian native and politician, worked with the confederation camp during the campaign. The Catholic Church, whose members were a minority on the island, lobbied for continued independence. Canada offered financial incentives, including a "baby bonus" for each child in a family. The Confederates were led by the charismatic Joseph (Joey) Smallwood, a former radio broadcaster, who had developed socialist political inclinations while working for a socialist newspaper in New York City. Following confederation, Smallwood led Newfoundland for decades as the elected premier. His policies as premier were closer to liberalism than socialism.

== Flags of Newfoundland ==
The Newfoundland Blue Ensign, Newfoundland's colonial government flag from 1870 to 1904

The "updated" Newfoundland Blue Ensign, government ensign from 1904 to 1965

The Newfoundland Red Ensign, Newfoundland's civil ensign from 1904 to 1965

The first flag to specifically represent Newfoundland is thought to have been an image of a green fir tree on a pink background that was in use in the early 19th century. The first official flag identifying Newfoundland, flown by vessels in service of the colonial government, was the Newfoundland Blue Ensign, adopted in 1870 and used until 1904, when it was modified slightly. In 1904, the crown of the Blue Ensign was replaced with the Great Seal of Newfoundland (having been given royal approval in 1827) and the British Parliament designated Newfoundland Red and Blue ensigns as official flags specifically for Newfoundland. The Red and Blue ensigns with the Great Seal of Newfoundland in the fly were used officially from 1904 until 1965, with the Red Ensign being flown as civil ensign by merchant shipping, and the Blue being flown by governmental ships (after the British tradition of having different flags for merchant/naval and government vessel identification). On September 26, 1907, King Edward VII of the United Kingdom declared the Colony of Newfoundland, as an independent dominion within the British Empire, and from that point until 1965, the Newfoundland Red Ensign was used as the civil ensign of the Dominion of Newfoundland with the Blue Ensign, again, reserved for government shipping identification. In 1931 the Newfoundland National Assembly adopted the Union Jack as the official national flag, with the Red and Blue Ensigns retained as ensigns for shipping identification.

The Union Flag, official flag of both the Dominion and province of Newfoundland from 1931 to 1980

Flag of Newfoundland and Labrador, legislated as the provincial flag on May 28, 1980

On March 31, 1949, Newfoundland became a province of Canada but retained the Union Jack in legislature, still designating it as the "national" flag. This was later reaffirmed by the Revised Statutes Act of 1952, and the Union Jack remained the official flag of Newfoundland until 1980, when it was replaced by the current provincial flag. (See Province of Newfoundland and Labrador for continued discussion of provincial flags.)

== Points of interest ==
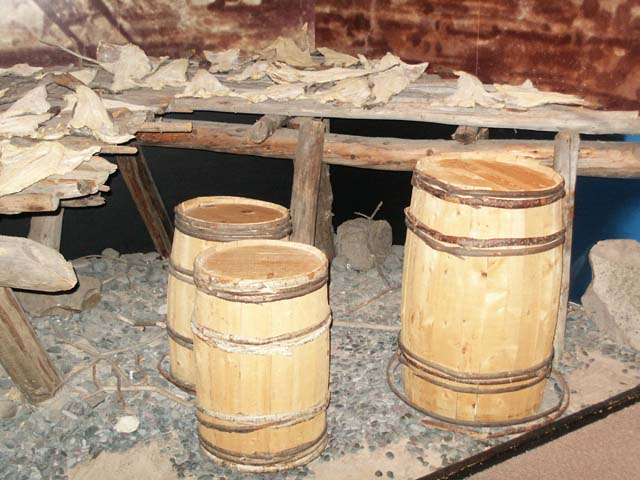
Cod, the traditional mainstay of Newfoundland fisheries

As one of the first places in the New World where Europeans settled, Newfoundland also has a history of European colonization. St. John's is the oldest city in Canada and the oldest continuously settled location in English-speaking North America. The St. John's census metropolitan area includes 12 suburban communities, the largest of which are the city of Mount Pearl and the towns of Conception Bay South and Paradise. The province's third-largest city is Corner Brook, which is situated on the Bay of Islands on the west coast of the island. The bay was named by Captain James Cook who surveyed the coast in 1767. The island of Newfoundland has numerous provincial parks such as Barachois Pond Provincial Park, considered to be a model forest, as well as two national parks.

- Gros Morne National Park is located on the west coast; it was designated as a UNESCO World Heritage Site in 1987 due to its complex geology and remarkable scenery. It is the largest national park in Atlantic Canada at 1,805 km^{2} (697 sq mi) and is a popular tourist destination.
- Terra Nova National Park, on the island's east side, preserves the rugged geography of the Bonavista Bay region. It allows visitors to explore the historic interplay of land, sea and man.
- L'Anse aux Meadows is an archaeological site located near the northernmost tip of the island (Cape Norman). It is the only known site of a Norse village in North America outside of Greenland, and is designated as a UNESCO World Heritage Site. It is the only widely accepted site of pre-Columbian trans-oceanic contact. It has associations with the attempted colony of Vinland established by Leif Ericson around 1003.
- Heart's Content, Newfoundland and Labrador was given its place in the history of international communications by Cyrus West Field who chose it as the terminus of his Transatlantic telegraph cable, leading to establishment of the Heart's Content Cable Station.

The island has many tourism opportunities, ranging from sea kayaking, camping, fishing and hunting, to hiking. The International Appalachian Trail (IAT) is being extended along the island's mountainous west coast. On the east coast, the East Coast Trail extends through the Avalon Peninsula for 220 km (140 mi), beginning near Fort Amherst in St. John's and ending in Cappahayden, with an additional 320 km (200 mi) of trail under construction. The Marble Mountain Ski Resort near Corner Brook is a major attraction in the winter for skiers in eastern Canada. Other major communities include the following towns:

- Gander, home to the Gander International Airport.
- Grand Falls-Windsor, a service centre for the central part of the island.
- Channel-Port aux Basques, the "Gateway to Newfoundland", as it is the closest point on the island to the province of Nova Scotia, as well as the location of the Marine Atlantic ferry terminal connecting the island to the rest of Canada.
- Stephenville, former location of the Ernest Harmon Air Force Base and currently the Stephenville Airport.

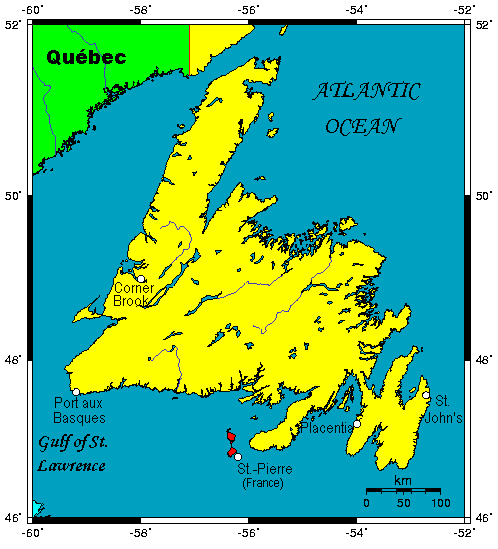
Island of Newfoundland

Educational institutions include the provincial university, Memorial University of Newfoundland whose main campus is situated in St. John's, along with the Grenfell Campus in Corner Brook, in addition to the College of the North Atlantic based in Stephenville and other communities. Bonavista, Placentia and Ferryland are all historic locations for various early European settlement or discovery activities. Tilting Harbour on Fogo Island is a provincial Registered Heritage District, as well as a National Cultural Landscape District of Canada. This is one of only two national historic sites in Canada so recognized for their Irish heritage. Entertainment opportunities abound in the island's three cities and numerous towns, particularly during summer festivals. For nightlife, George Street, located in downtown St. John's, is closed to traffic 20 hours per day. The Mile One Stadium in St. John's is the venue for large sporting and concert events in the province. In March, the annual seal hunt (of the harp seal) takes place.

== Communities ==
Largest municipalities (2016 population)

1. St. John's (108,860)
2. Conception Bay South (26,199)
3. Mount Pearl (23,120)
4. Paradise (21,389)
5. Corner Brook (19,806)
6. Grand Falls-Windsor (14,171)
7. Gander (11,688)
8. Portugal Cove-St. Philip's (8,147)
9. Torbay (7,899)
10. Stephenville (6,623)
11. Clarenville (6,291)
12. Bay Roberts (6,012)
13. Marystown (5,316)
14. Deer Lake (5,249)

== Geography ==
Köppen climate types of Newfoundland

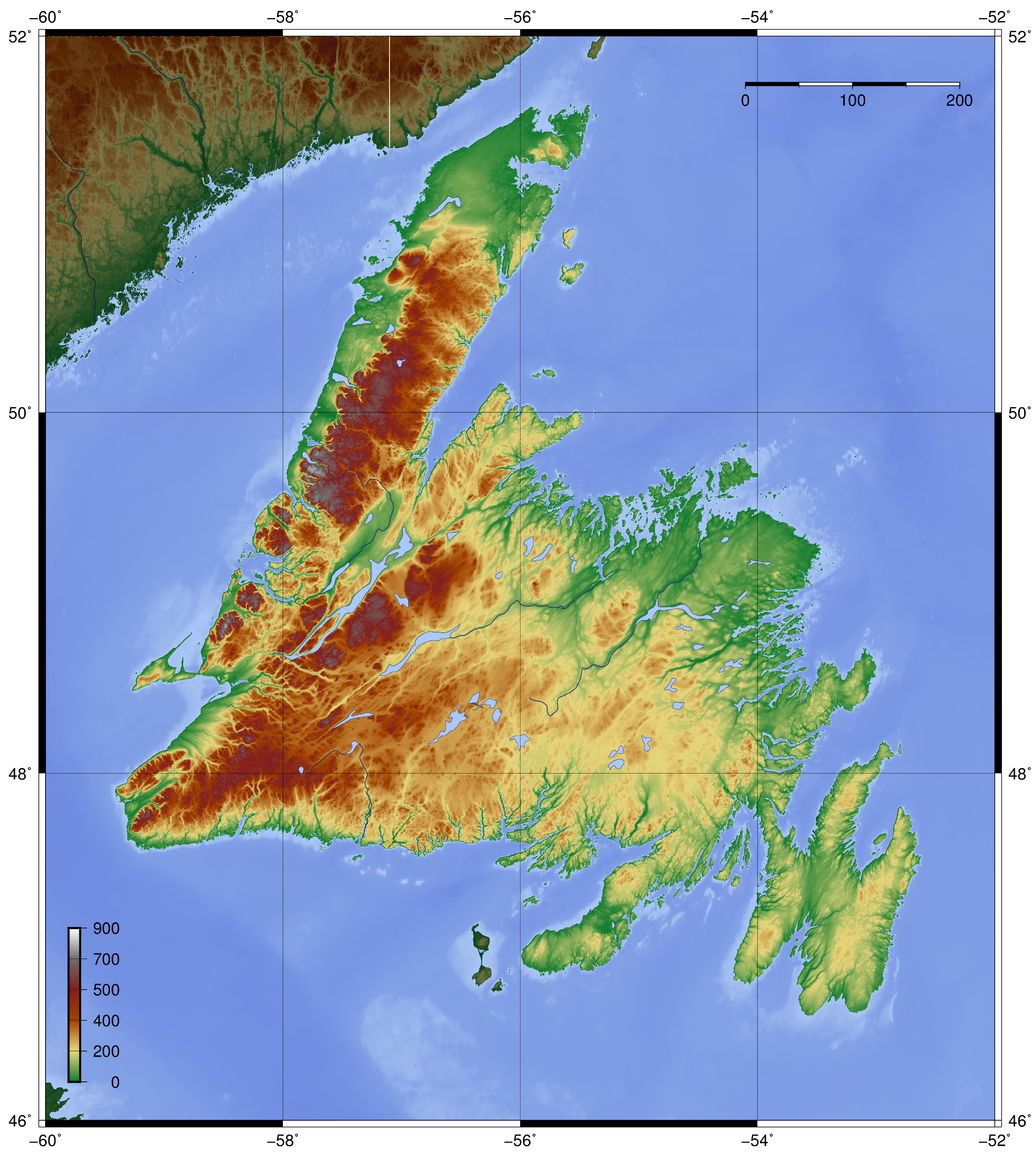
Topography of Newfoundland

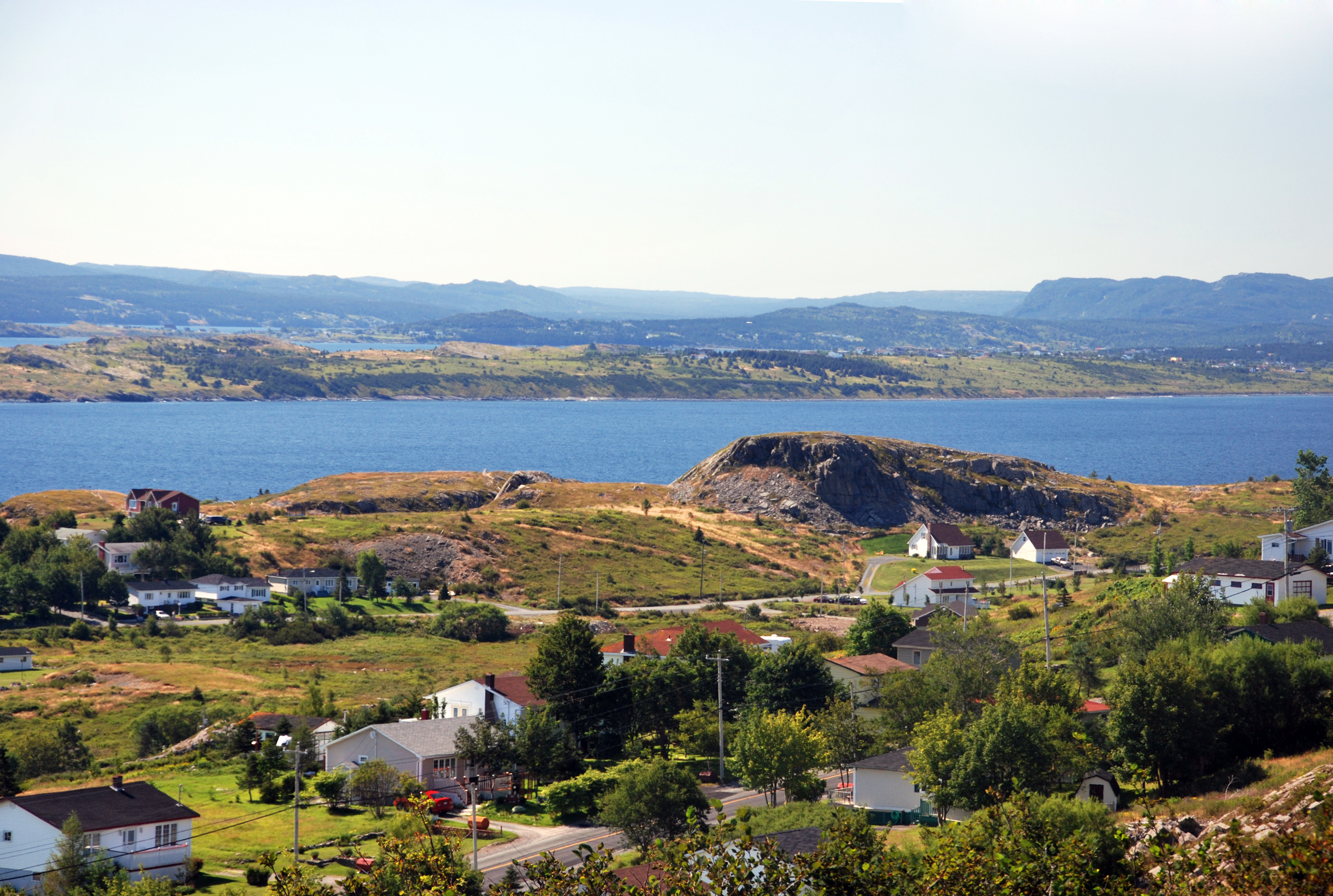
View of Conception Bay in 2010

Newfoundland is roughly triangular, with each side being approximately 500 kilometres (310 mi), and having an area of 108,860 square kilometres (42,030 sq mi). Newfoundland and its associated small islands have a total area of 111,390 square kilometres (43,010 sq mi). Newfoundland extends between latitudes 46°36'N and 51°38'N.

=== Climate ===
Newfoundland is primarily characterized by having a subarctic (Köppen Dfc) or a humid continental climate (Köppen Dfb). Locations on the extreme southeast of the island receive sufficient maritime influence to qualify as having a subpolar oceanic climate (Köppen Cfc).

=== Features ===
- Baccalieu Island
- Barasway Bay
- Barred Bay
- Bay de Loup
- Bay Le Moine
- Cinq Cerf Bay
- Connoire Bay
- Diable Bay
- Dragon Bay
- Good Bay
- Grand Galets Bay
- Knife Bay
- La Hune Bay
- Marguerite Bay
- Northwest Bay

== Railways ==
Currently closed Newfoundland Railway

== See also ==
- Flag of Newfoundland and Labrador
- Heritage Foundation of Newfoundland and Labrador
- Category:Newfoundland and Labrador
