= Northwest Bay =

Bay in Newfoundland and Labrador, Canada

Coordinates: 52.566°N 66.348°W

Northwest Bay (or Roncière Bay) is a natural bay off the island of Newfoundland in the province of Newfoundland and Labrador, Canada.
