= Barasway Bay =

Coordinates: 46.866°N 55.815°W

Barasway Bay (or The Barasway) is natural bay or cove on the island of Newfoundland in the province of Newfoundland and Labrador, Canada. Cornelius Island is nearby.
