= Marguerite Bay (Newfoundland and Labrador) =

Natural bay in Newfoundland and Labrador, Canada

Coordinates: 51.366°N 55.581°W

Marguerite Bay is a natural bay off the island of Newfoundland in the province of Newfoundland and Labrador, Canada.
