= Bay de Loup (Newfoundland and Labrador) =

Natural bay on Newfoundland, Canada

Coordinates: 47.649°N 57.531°W

Bay de Loup (translation: Wolf Bay) is a natural bay on the island of Newfoundland in the province of Newfoundland and Labrador, Canada. It is near the former locality of the same name. The bay extends northeastward 2.75 miles (4.43 km) from its entrance between Bay de Loup Point and Kings Head Point, situated northwestward, about 1,700 yards (1.6 km; 0.97 mi). The shores of the bay are precipitous, with deep water.
