= Grand Galets Bay =

Bay in Newfoundland and Labrador, Canada

Coordinates: 51.600°N 55.432°W

Grand Galets Bay is a natural bay off the island of Newfoundland in the province of Newfoundland and Labrador, Canada.
