= Bay Le Moine =

Bay in Newfoundland and Labrador, Canada

Coordinates: 47.649°N 58.631°W

Bay Le Moine (or La Moine Bay) is a natural bay on the island of Newfoundland in the province of Newfoundland and Labrador, Canada.
