= La Hune Bay =

Natural bay in Newfoundland and Labrador, Canada

Coordinates: 47.599°N 56.865°W

La Hune Bay is natural bay on the island of Newfoundland in the province of Newfoundland and Labrador, Canada. It is by Cape La Hune.
