= Knife Bay =

Natural bay or cove in Newfoundland and Labrador, Canada

Coordinates: 47.588°N 53.675°W

Knife Bay (or Baie de Couteau, or Knife Cove) is natural bay or cove on the island of Newfoundland in the province of Newfoundland and Labrador, Canada. Cornelius Island is nearby.
