= Cinq Cerf Bay =

Coordinates: 47.683°N 58.115°W

Cinq Cerf Bay (Five Stag Bay, or Baie de Cinq Cerfs) is a natural bay on the island of Newfoundland in the province of Newfoundland and Labrador, Canada.
