= Barred Bay =

Coordinates: 50.816°N 57.198°W

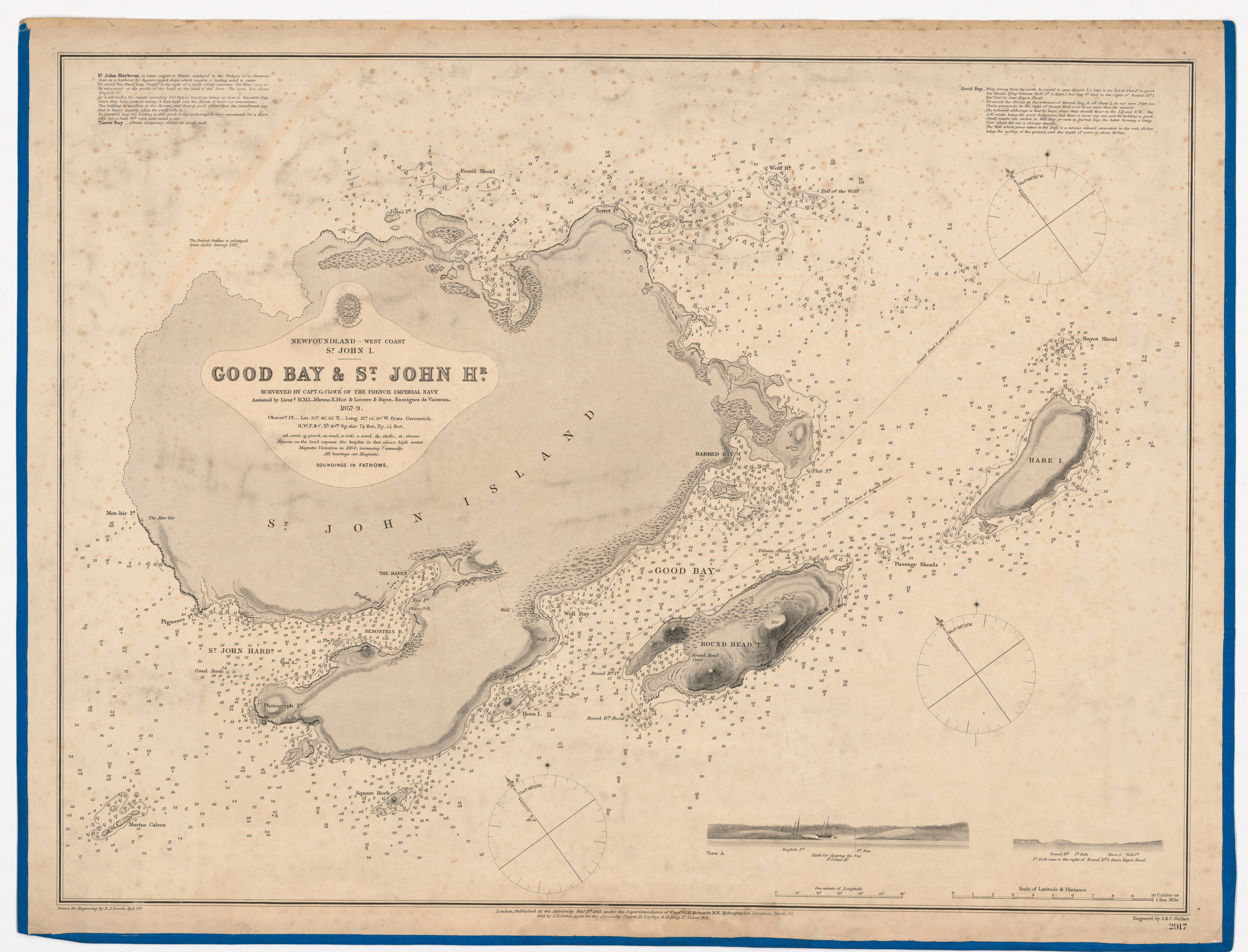
An 1865 map of Good Bay, St. John Harbor

Barred Bay is a natural bay near St. John Harbor, off the island of Newfoundland in the province of Newfoundland and Labrador, Canada. It is located on the southern part of St. John Harbor, in a bay called Good Bay. Well Bay is a natural indentation in the northern part of Good Bay, at its eastern end. In the western part of Barred Bay, there is an islet called Sheep Islet, which is 1.5 m (4.9 ft) high.
