= Diable Bay =

Bay in Newfoundland and Labrador, Canada

Coordinates: 51.550°N 56.748°W

Diable Bay is a small, open bay on the island of Newfoundland in the province of Newfoundland and Labrador, Canada. The settlement of L'Anse-au-Diable was close by.
