= Good Bay =

Coordinates: 50.816°N 57.198°W

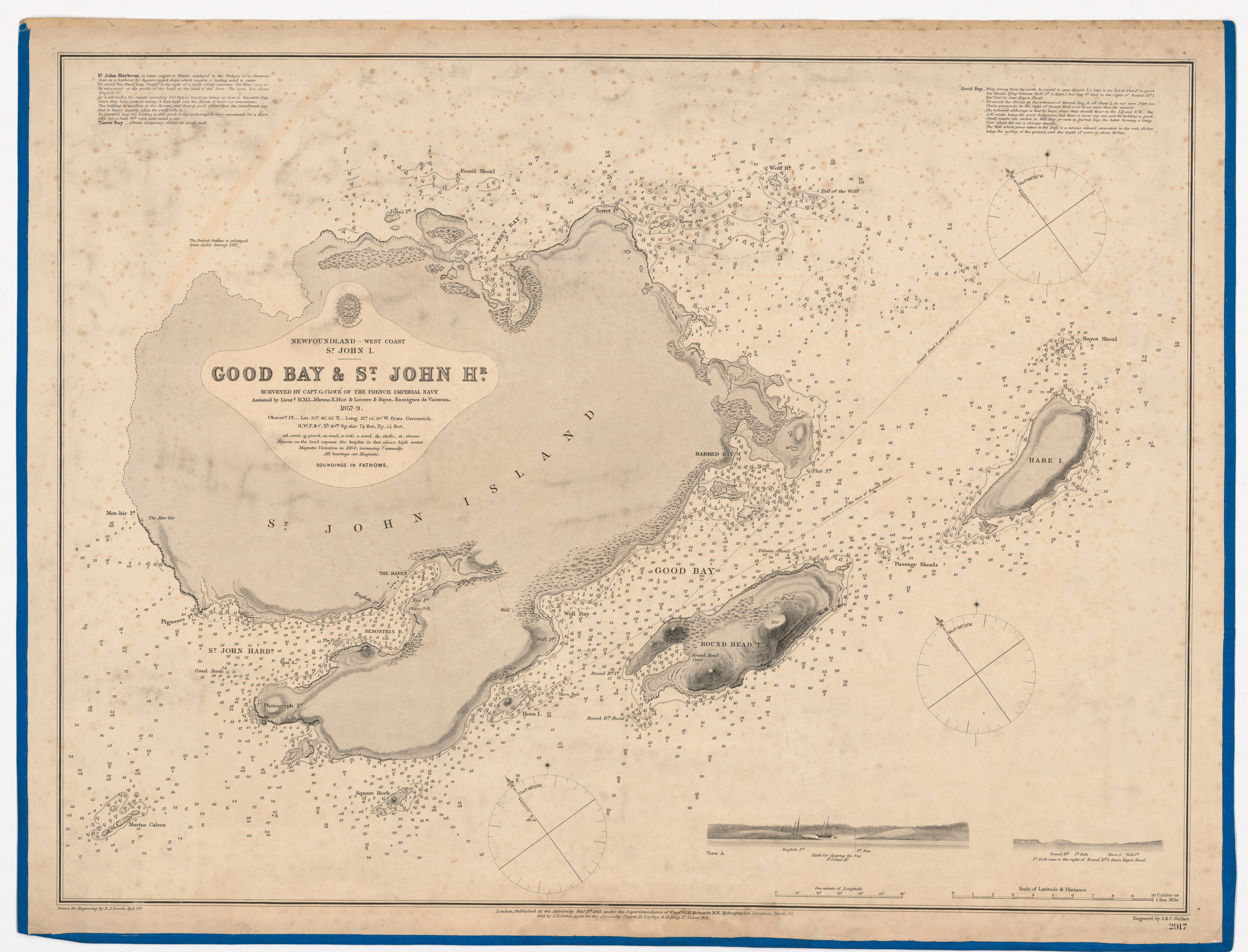
An 1865 map of Good Bay in St. John Harbor

Good Bay is a natural bay on the island of Newfoundland in the province of Newfoundland and Labrador, Canada. Good Bay is located on the southern part of St. John Harbor.

There are two entrances to Good Bay on its northern side: Well Point (at its west end), and Flat Point (at its east end). Two anchorage beacons are located at Well Point. Good Bay's northern side also has some smaller natural bays within it, such as Well Bay and Barred Bay. There is also an islet called Sheep Islet.

Good Bay's southern side has multiple landforms, including a 30-meter (98.4-foot) hummock called Round Head, about 0.4 mile northeast of Round Head Point. Off the northern side of Round Head Island is a shallow area called Falaise Shoal, which has a depth of approximately 3.2 m (10.5 feet). There is also an island called Horn Island.
