= Connoire Bay =

Bay in Newfoundland and Labrador, Canada

Coordinates: 47.666°N 57.915°W

Connoire Bay is a natural bay or cove on the island of Newfoundland in the province of Newfoundland and Labrador, Canada. Miffel Island is nearby.
