= Dragon Bay =

Natural bay in Newfoundland, Canada

Coordinates: 47.633°N 56.365°W

Dragon Bay is a natural bay in Newfoundland, Canada. Indrafts include Mooring Cove, Willis Cove, Tickle Cove, and Crew Cove. Dragon bay runs in a westerly direction for more than 3 miles (4.8 km) from the entrance to Facheux Bay. It is narrow and deep throughout, with no anchorage. The south point of the entrance to this bay is Red Rock, the north point is Gray Rock, which has a cave. Little Hole lies 0.75 miles (1.21 km) west of Dragon Bay, and has shelter for small vessels.
