= Grandy's Point =

Abandoned community in Canada

Location of Grandy's Point in Newfoundland and Labrador

Grandy's Point is an abandoned fishing community located in the province of Newfoundland and Labrador. It was founded in the early 1800's by a Connors family and a Collins family. The community is recorded as containing 14 residents in 1817 in an informal census recorded by the travelling Methodist Minister John Lewis. The population grew to 42 by 1836, 47 by 1869, and 53 by 1884. Connorses, Collinses, Tibbos, and Flynns were all fishing households settled in the cove in the early 1870's. By the late 19th century, the residents began abandoning the community for nearby outports such as Clattice Harbour and St. Kyran's. The community had shrunk to a population of 8 Newfoundland-born residents by 1891, with no children under 15 remaining in the community. Only 3 members of the community could read at the time, and only 2 could write.

Photo of Grandy's Point taken by Pete Rogers in 2012.
